= List of IWRG shows in 2016 =

2016 events by International Wrestling Revolution Group

2016

International Wrestling Revolution Group shows chronology
← Previous; 2015	Next → 2017

The Mexican Lucha libre, or professional wrestling promotion International Wrestling Revolution Group (IWRG) has produced and scripted a number of wrestling shows since their creation on January 1, 1996 by promoter Adolfo "Pirata" Moreno. In 2018, IWRG held a total of 73 shows, an average of 1.4 shows per week, all in Arena Naucalpan. On nineteen occasions the main event of the show was a championship match and on eight occasions the main event was a Lucha de Apuestas, or "bet match". (Note: All statistics are supported by the individual sources in the table.)

== 2016 events ==
Date	Event	Main Event	Ref.
January 3, 2016	IWRG 20th Anniversary Show	Danny Casas vs. Toscano in a Lucha de Apuestas match	
January 10, 2016	IWRG Show	Herodes Jr., El Hijo de Dos Caras and Veneno vs. Demon Clown, Máscara Año 2000 Jr. and Toscano	
January 17, 2016	IWRG Show	La Dinastia de la Muerte (Negro Navarro, Trauma I and Trauma II (c) vs. Los Panteras (El Hijo del Pantera, Pantera and Pantera I) for the IWRG Intercontinental Trios Championship	
January 24, 2016	IWRG Show	Herodes Jr., Pagano and Toscano vs. Danny Casas, El Hijo de Dos Caras and Veneno	
January 27, 2016	IWRG Copa Higher Power	Gym FILL (Black Dragón, Centvrión, Diablo Jr. I, Freyser, El Hijo de Máscara Sagrada, El Hijo del Alebrije, Imposible, Power Bull) vs. Gym Arkano (Balak, Danger King, Energia, Imposter, Motocross, Novasonic, Orión, Royer Boy)	
January 31, 2016	El Protector	Atomic Star and Herodes Jr. vs. Dragon Fly and El Hijo de Dos Caras	
February 3, 2016	IWRG Show	Los Insoportables (Apolo Estrada Jr., Canis Lupus and Eterno) vs. Argos, Emperador Azteca and Pantera I	
February 7, 2016	IWRG Show	Los Panteras (El Hijo del Pantera and Pantera (c) vs. La Dinastia de la Muerte (Negro Navarro and Trauma II) for the IWRG Intercontinental Tag Team Championship	
February 10, 2016	IWRG Show	Los Mariachis Loco (El Diablo Jr. I, El Hijo del Diablo and Imposible) vs. Los Insportables (Apolo Estrada Jr., Canis Lupus and Eterno)	
February 14, 2016	Triangular de la Muerte	Herodes Jr. vs. Trauma I vs. El Hijo de Dos Caras Lucha de Apuestas, hair vs. mask vs IWRG Intercontinental Heavyweight Championship	
February 21, 2016	IWRG Show	El Hijo de Dos Caras, El Solar and Veneno vs. Heddi Karaoui, Herodes Jr. and Mr. Águila	
February 24, 2016	Torneo FILL XLVIII	Gym Toluca (Black Mercury, El Resplandor, Gemelo Fantástico I, Gemelo Fantástico II, Iron Kid, Príncipe Pantera I, Príncipe Pantera Jr. and Psycko Kid) vs. Gym FILL (Alas de Acero, Aramís, Atomic Star, Dragon Fly, Freyser, Kanon, Power Bull and Violencia Jr.)	
February 28, 2016	México vs. Francia	Heddi Karaoui vs. El Solar for the IWRG Intercontinental Middleweight Championship	
March 2, 2016	IWRG Show	Los Tortugas Ninjas (Leo, Mike and Rafy) vs. Los Comandos Elite (Factor, Rayan and Spector)	
March 13, 2016	Rebelión de los Juniors	Danny Casas vs. Máscara Año 2000 Jr. vs. El Hijo de Dos Caras vs. Apolo Estrada Jr. vs. Diablo Jr. I vs. Picudo Jr. vs. El Hijo del Solar vs. Máscara Sagrada Jr. vs. Matrix Jr. vs. El Hijo del Alebrije in a #1 contender for the IWRG Junior de Juniors Championship, eight-man elimination match	
March 16, 2016	Choque de Rudos	Los Traumas (Trauma I and Trauma II) vs. Los Insoportables (Canis Lupus and Eterno)	
March 27, 2016	IWRG Show	Danny Casas vs. Golden Magic (c) for the IWRG Junior de Juniors Championship	
March 30, 2016	Torneo FILL XLIX Revancha	Gym Zeus (Atomic Fly, Fly Star, Keiser Drago, Keshin Black, Komachi, Marduk, Salchichita and Toxin Boy) vs. Gym FILL (Adrenalina, Aramís, Atomic Star, Blue Monsther, Dragon Fly, Freyser, Power Bull and Shadow Boy)	
April 3, 2016	Cabellera vs. Cabellera	El Hijo del Diablo vs. Cerebro Negro Lucha de Apuestas, hair vs. hair match	
April 6, 2016	IWRG Show	Los Insportables (Canis Lupus and Eterno) vs. Los Traumas (Trauma I and Trauma II)	
April 10, 2016	IWRG Show	Los Mariachis Loco (El Diablo Jr., El Hijo del Diablo and Imposible) (c) vs. Los Cerebros Terrible (Black Terry, Cerebro Negro and Dr. Cerebro) for the Distrito Federal Trios Championship	
April 13, 2016	IWRG Show	La Dinastia de la Muerte (Negro Navarro, Trauma I and Trauma II) (c) vs. Los Insportables (Apolo Estrada Jr., Canis Lupus and Eterno) for the IWRG Intercontinental Trios Championship	
April 17, 2016	Guerra del Golfo	Dr. Cerebro vs. Astro in a Lucha de Apuestas steel cage match	
April 20, 2016	Lucha de Fieras	Canis Lupus vs. Trauma I	
April 24, 2016	IWRG Show	Máscara Año 2000 Jr. vs. Trauma I (c) for the IWRG Intercontinental Heavyweight Championship	
April 27, 2016	IWRG Show	Máscara Año 2000 Jr. (c) vs. Canis Lupus for the IWRG Intercontinental Heavyweight Championship	
May 1, 2016	Gran Function Dia Del Niño	Los Insoportables (Apolo Estrada Jr., Canis Lupus and Eterno) vs. Toscano and Los Traumas (Trauma I and Trauma II)	
May 8, 2016	Relevos Increibles	Canis Lupus and Trauma I vs. El Hijo de Dos Caras and Máscara Año 2000 Jr.	
May 11, 2016	Torneo Fill 50	Gym FILL (Aramís, Atomic Boy, Dragon Fly, Fireman, Galaxy, El Hijo del Alebrije, Kanon and Shadow Boy) vs. Gym Promociones del Norte (Astaroth, Guerrero Jr., Pez Tiburón, Relámpago Jr., Rey Azteca, Rey Jaguar, Último Samurai and Uranio)	
May 15, 2016	IWRG Show	Canis Lupus, Danny Casas and Máscara Año 2000 Jr. vs. El Hijo de Dos Caras, El Hijo del Dr. Wagner Jr. and Trauma I	
May 22, 2016	IWRG Show	Fuerza Guerrera, Mr. Electro and Toscano vs. Damián 666, Danny Casas and Ultramán Jr.	
May 25, 2016	IWRG Show	Cerebro Negro (c) vs. Trauma II for the IWRG Intercontinental Welterweight Championship	
May 29, 2016	IWRG Show	Demon Clown, Máscara Año 2000 Jr. and Trauma I vs. Canis Lupus, Mr. Electro and Toscano	
June 1, 2016	Choque de Fieras	Los Insportables (Apolo Estrada Jr., Canis Lupus, Demon Clown and Eterno) vs. Los Comandos Elite (Factor, Rayan, Spartan and Spector)	
June 5, 2016	Festival de las Máscaras	Toscano vs. Danny Casas in a Lucha de Apuestas steel cage match	
June 8, 2016	IWRG Show	Los Insportables (Apolo Estrada Jr., Canis Lupus, Eterno and Relámpago) vs. Freelance, El Hijo del Alebrije, Rafy and Zatura	
June 12, 2016	IWRG Show	Mr. Electro vs. Máscara Año 2000 Jr. (c) for the IWRG Intercontinental Heavyweight Championship	
June 22, 2016	Torneo FILL 51	Gym FILL (Aramís, Dragon Fly, Fireman, Galaxy, El Hijo del Alebrije, Kanon, Shadow Boy and Zatura) vs. Gym Promociones del Norte (Ángel Guerrero, Ares I, Ares II, Camaleón I, Camaleón II, Fight Panther, Guerrero Azteca and the Tiger)	
June 26, 2016	IWRG Show	Mr. Electro and Los Traumas (Trauma I and Trauma II) vs Los Insoportables (Canis Lupus and Eterno) and Máscara Año 2000 Jr.	
June 29, 2016	Gym FILL vs. Gym Promociones del Norte	Black Terry and Shadow Boy vs. Apolo Estrada Jr. and the Tiger	
July 3, 2016	IWRG Show	Canis Lupus and Máscara Año 2000 Jr. vs. El Hijo de Dos Caras and Mr. Electro	
July 6, 2016	IWRG Show	Los Insportables (Apolo Estrada Jr., Canis Lupus, Eterno, and Relámpago) vs. Los Tortugas Ninjas (Leo, Mike, Rafy and Teelo)	
July 10, 2016	Gran Mano a Mano Esperando	Mr. Electro vs. Máscara Año 2000 Jr.	
July 13, 2016	IWRG Show	Imposible (c) vs Emperador Azteca for the IWRG Intercontinental Lightweight Championship	
July 17, 2016	Cabellera vs. Cabellera	Mr. Electro vs. Máscara Año 2000 Jr.	
July 20, 2016	Copa Higher Power	Gym Infierno (Eddy Santos, Juana La Loca, Lord Phantom, Rey Profeta, Rosario Negro, Vengador, Viajero Extremo and Viajero Jr.) vs. Gym FILL (Adrenalina, Aramís, Blue Monsther, Emperador Azteca, Galaxy, El Hijo del Alebrije, Kanon and Power Bull)	
July 24, 2016	IWRG Show	El Hijo de Dos Caras, Mr. Electro and Trauma II vs. Canis Lupus, Danny Casas and Máscara Año 2000 Jr.	
July 27, 2016	IWRG Show	Judas el Traidor, Rosario Negro and Viajero Extremo vs. Black Terry, El Hijo del Alebrije and Kanon	
July 31, 2016	Relevos de Fieras	Canis Lupus and Máscara Año 2000 Jr. vs. Mr. Electro and Trauma I	
August 3, 2016	Máscara vs. Máscara	Dragon Fly vs. Demonio Infernal	
August 7, 2016	Máscara vs. Cabellera	Canis Lupus vs. Máscara Año 2000 Jr. in a Lucha de Apuestas, mask vs. hair match	
August 10, 2016	IWRG Show	Black Terry vs. Judas El Traidor	
August 14, 2016	IWRG Show	Máscara Año 2000 Jr. and Negro Navarro vs. Canis Lupus and El Hijo de Dos Caras	
August 17, 2016	Cabellera vs. Cabellera	Black Terry vs. Judas El Traidor in a Lucha de Apuestas, hair vs. hair match	
August 21, 2016	IWRG Show	El Hijo de Dos Caras (c) vs. Máscara Año 2000 Jr. for the IWRG Junior de Juniors Championship	
August 24, 2016	IWRG Show	Hip Hop Man (c) vs. Dragon Fly for the AIWA Argentiniean National Cruiserweight Championship	
September 4, 2016	Máscara vs. Máscara	Trauma I vs. Canis Lupus in a Lucha de Apuestas, mask vs. mask match	
September 11, 2016	IWRG Show	Canis Lupus, Máscara Año 2000 Jr. and Rey Misterio Heredero vs. El Texano Jr., Imposible and Trauma I	
September 18, 2016	IWRG Show	Rey Misterio Heredero vs. Imposible (c) for the IWRG Intercontinental Middleweight Championship	
September 28, 2016	Torneo FILL 53	"Lucha Libre Boom" (Demente Extreme, El Pachico, Fuerza Negra, Kid Jaguar, Ojo De Halcón, Pinochito, Shadow and Tromba) vs. IWRG (Alas de Acero, Aramís, Araña de Plata, Atomic Star, Black Dragón, Dragón Fly, El Hijo del Alebrije and Kanon)	
October 2, 2016	IWRG Show	Trauma I vs. Canis Lupus for the IWRG Intercontinental Heavyweight Championship	
October 9, 2016	IWRG Show	Máscara Año 2000 Jr., Silver King and Trauma II vs. El Hijo de Dos Caras, Imposible and Mr. Electro	
October 23, 2016	IWRG Show	Imposible (c) vs. Heddi Karaoui for the IWRG Intercontinental Middleweight Championship	
October 26, 2016	Torneo FILL 54	Gym 2 de Junio (Ahijado de la Muerte, American Star, Cosmico, Luis Cirio, Luis Cirio Jr., Manny Cirio, Pequeno Unicornio and Tony Cirio Jr. vs. GYM IWRG (Arana de Plata, Atomic Star, Black Dragon, Demonio Infernal, Dragón Fly, El Hijo del Alebrije, Hip Hop Man and Kanon)	
November 2, 2016	El Castillo del Terror	Hijo del Alebrije vs Emperador Azteca vs Tortuga Teelo vs El Diablo Jr. I vs Zatura vs Killer Jr. vs Bobby Lee Jr. vs Violencia Jr. vs Imposible vs Pantera I in a steel cage match	
November 6, 2016	Copa Huracán Ramírez	16 man torneo cibernetico	
November 13, 2016	IWRG Show	Eterno, Máscara Año 2000 Jr., and Trauma I vs Canis Lupus, Chicano and Golden Magic	
November 20, 2016	IWRG Show	Axel, Pantera I and Golden Magic vs. Canis Lupus, Máscara Año 2000 Jr. and The Killer Jr.	
December 4, 2016	IWRG Show	The Killer Jr. and Pirata Morgan Jr. vs. Golden Magic and El Pantera #1	
December 11, 2016	Rey del Ring	The 2016 Rey del Ring tournament	
December 14, 2016	Torneo FILL 55	Gym FILL vs. Gym Zeus in a Copa Higher Power tournament	
December 18, 2016	9. Aniversario Loctuso de Adolfo Moreno	Trauma I vs. Mr. Electro for the IWRG Intercontinental Heavyweight Championship	
December 21, 2016	Arena Naucalpan 39th Anniversary Show	Golden Magic and Pirata Morgan Jr. vs. The Killer Jr. and Pantera I vs. Imposible and Relampago in a Relevos Suicida match	

== See also ==
- 2016 in professional wrestling
