= List of IWRG shows in 2018 =

2018 events by International Wrestling Revolution Group

2018

International Wrestling Revolution Group shows chronology
← Previous; 2017	Next → 2019

The Mexican Lucha libre, or professional wrestling promotion International Wrestling Revolution Group (IWRG) has produced and scripted a number of wrestling shows since their creation on January 1, 1996 by promoter Adolfo "Pirata" Moreno. In 2018, IWRG held a total of 63 shows, an average of 1.21 shows per week, all in Arena Naucalpan. On eight occasions the main event of the show was a championship match and on nine occasions the main event was a Lucha de Apuestas, or "bet match". (Note: All statistics are supported by the individual sources in the table.)

== 2018 events ==
Date	Event	Main Event	Ref.
January 1, 2018	IWRG 22nd Anniversary Show	Imposible (c) vs. Dr. Cerebro in an IWRG Rey del Ring Championship Ladder steel cage match	
January 7, 2018	Zona de Ejecucion	Aramís vs. Black Dragon vs. Alas de Acero vs. El Diablo Jr. vs. Dinamic Black vs. Dragon Fly vs. El Hijo del Alebrije vs. El Pantera I vs. Eterno vs. Freelance vs. Heddi Karaoui vs. Imposible vs. Leo vs. Mike vs. Rafy vs. Teelo	
January 14, 2018	IWRG show	El Pantera I (c) vs. Aramís for the IWRG Intercontinental Lightweight Championship	
January 21, 2018	IWRG show	Los Traumas (Trauma I and Trauma II) and Dr. Cerebro vs. Bombero Infernal, Rokambole Jr. and Villano V Jr.	
January 28, 2018	IWRG show	Dr. Cerebro vs. Bombero Infernal (c) for the IWRG Intercontinental Middleweight Championship	
January 31, 2018	67. Torneo FILL	Copa Higher Power Torneo Cibernetico	
February 2, 2018	IWRG show	Capo del Norte, Capo del Sur and Eterno vs. Dragon Fly, El Hijo del Alebrije and Rafy	
February 11, 2018	Cabellera vs. Cabellera	Black Dragon vs. Oficial Spartan in a Lucha de Apuestas, hair vs. hair match	
February 18, 2018	IWRG show	Los Traumas (Trauma I and Trauma II) and Obett vs. Aramís, El Hijo del Pantera and El Pantera	
February 21, 2018	IWRG show	Eterno, Leroy and Obett vs. Los Tortugas Ninjas (Leo, Mike and Rafy)	
February 23, 2018	IWRG show	Los Tortugas Ninjas (Leo, Mike, Rafy and Teelo) vs. Capo del Norte, Dragon Bane, Rokambole Jr. and Villano V Jr.	
February 25, 2018	El Protector	Rokambole Jr. and Villano V Jr. vs. Ram El Carnero and Trauma I	
March 4, 2018	IWRG show	Aramís, El Hijo del Pantera and El Pantera vs. Los Traumas (Trauma I and Trauma II) and Obett	
March 7, 2018	IWRG show	Obett vs. Fantasma de la Opera	
March 11, 2018	IWRG show	Rokambole Jr. and Villano V Jr. vs. Black Warrior and Black Warrior Jr. (c) for the IWRG Intercontinental Tag Team Championship	
March 14, 2018	IWRG show	Los Comandos Elite (Oficial Factor and Oficial Spector) vs. Los Tortugas Ninjas (Mike and Teelo) vs. Capo del Norte and Máscara Año 2000 Jr. in a three-way tag team match	
March 18, 2018	Rebelión de los Juniors	El Hijo del Alebrije vs. Apolo Estrada Jr. vs. Capo del Norte vs. El Diablo Jr. vs. Dr. Karonte vs. El Hijo del Medico Asesino vs. El Hijo del Pantera vs. El Hijo de Pirata Morgan vs. Lunatic Extreme vs. Mascara Magica Jr. vs. Hip Hop Man	
March 25, 2018	Cabellera vs. Cabellera	Ricky Marvin vs. Dr. Cerebro in a Lucha de Apuestas, hair vs. hair match	
April 1, 2018	IWRG show	El Hijo de Canis Lupus, Mr. Electro and Veneno vs. Los Traumas (Trauma I and Trauma II) and Obett	
April 4, 2018	IWRG show	El Hijo del Alebrije and Emperador Azteca vs. Capo del Norte and Máscara Año 2000 Jr.	
April 8, 2018	IWRG show	Los Traumas (Trauma I and Trauma II) and Obett vs. Canis Lupus, Mr. Electro and Veneno	
April 15, 2018	Guerra del Golfo	Mike vs. Teelo in a Lucha de Apuestas, mask vs. mask steel cage match	
April 22, 2018	IWRG show	Mr. Electro, Rey Wagner and Veneno vs. Capo del Norte, Dark Magic and Máscara Año 2000 Jr.	
April 29, 2018	IWRG show	Imposible, Mr. Electro and Villano V Jr. vs. Dark Magic, El Hijo del Medico Asesino and Máscara Año 2000 Jr.	
May 6, 2018	IWRG show	Dark Magic, El Hijo de Dos Caras and Mr. Electro vs. Los Traumas (Trauma I and Trauma II) and Máscara Año 2000 Jr.	
May 13, 2018	IWRG show	Emperador Azteca and Imposible vs. Los Traumas (Trauma I and Trauma II)	
May 20, 2018	Rey del Ring	30-man Rey del Ring elimination match	
May 23, 2018	IWRG/Lucha Libre Boom show	Los Oficiales (Oficial 911, Oficial AK-47 and Oficial Fierro) vs. Los Tortugas Ninjas (Leo, Mike and Teelo)	
May 27, 2018	IWRG show	El Hijo de Dos Caras, El Hijo del Medico Asesino, Mr. Electro and Silver King vs. Jungle Boy, La Migra, Ultimo Panda and Vapor	
June 3, 2018	Cabellera vs. Cabellera	Black Dragon vs. Lunatik Extreme in a Lucha de Apuestas, hair vs. hair match	
June 10, 2018	IWRG show	Los Terribles Cerebros (Cerebro Negro and Dr. Cerebro) vs. Los Traumas (Trauma I and Trauma II) and Emperador Azteca and Imposible in a three-way tag team match	
June 17, 2018	Festival de las Máscaras	El Hijo de L.A. Park and L.A. Park vs. Dragon Lee and Rush	
June 24, 2018	IWRG show	Cerebro Negro vs. Emperador Azteca (c) in a Lucha de Apuestas, hair vs. IWRG Intercontinental Welterweight Championship match	
July 1, 2018	IWRG show	El Mesias, Emperador Azteca and Imposible vs. Los Traumas (Trauma I and Trauma II) and Penta El 0M	
July 8, 2018	IWRG show	Cerebro Negro, El Hijo del Medico Asesino and X-Fly vs. Emperador Azteca, Imposible and Obett	
July 15, 2018	Cabellera vs. Cabellera	Obett vs. X-Fly in a Lucha de Apuestas, hair vs. hair match	
July 22, 2018	Zona de Ejecucion	Los Traumas (Trauma I and Trauma II), El Hijo del Medico Asesino and Eterno vs. Los Tortugas Ninjas (Leo, Mike and Rafy) and Relampago vs. El Hijo del Alebrije, Emperador Azteca, Freelance and Imposible vs. Dr. Cerebro, El Hijo de Canis Lupus, El Pantera and Veneno in an elimination match	
July 25, 2018	68. Torneo FILL	Copa Higher Power Torneo Cibernetico	
July 29, 2018	IWRG show	El Hijo del Medico Asesino, Eterno and Pirata Morgan vs. Apolo Estrada Jr., Capo del Norte and Capo del Sur	
August 5, 2018	Ejecucion Total	Imposible, Relampago and X-Fly vs. Los Tortugas Ninjas (Leo, Mike and Rafy) vs. Capo del Norte, Capol Del Sur and Pit Bull vs. Aramís, El Hijo de Canis Lupus and Pasion Crystal	
August 12, 2018	IWRG show	El Hijo de Dos Caras, El Mesias and Imposible vs. El Hijo del Medico Asesino, Obett and Trauma I	
August 16, 2018	IWRG show	Rush vs. Carístico vs. Penta El 0M	
August 19, 2018	69. Torneo FILL	Gym Zeuz vs. Gym Zaetas Del Ring vs. Gym Arena 23 vs. Gym FILL in a Lucha de Apuestas, mask vs. Hair 20-man steel cage match	
August 26, 2018	IWRG show	Freelance and Imposible vs. Aramís and Dragon Bane	
September 2, 2018	IWRG show	El Hijo del Medico Asesino, Eterno and Último Gladiador vs. El Hijo de Canis Lupus, Emperador Azteca and Mr. Electro	
September 9, 2018	Caravana de Campeones	Mr. Electro (c) vs. El Hijo del Medico Asesino for the IWRG Intercontinental Heavyweight Championship	
September 16, 2018	IWRG show	Dr. Cerebro, El Mesias and Ultimo Gladiador vs. La Secta (Cuervo and Escoria) and Mr. Electro	
September 23, 2018	IWRG show	Emperador Azteca, Imposible and Mr. Electro defeat El Hijo de Pirata Morgan, Sinn Bodhi and Último Gladiador	
September 30, 2018	74. torneo FILL	Team IWRG (Black Puma, Chef Benito, Chicanito, Fire Man, Guerrero 2000, Lunatik Xtreme, Puma de Oro and Shadow Boy) vs. Lucha Memes (19 Y Miedo, Alas de Acero, Apolo, Chris Stone Jr;, Dragon Negro, Iron Kid, Manchitas and Psique)	
October 3, 2018	AAA/IWRG show	Mr. Electro vs. El Texano Jr. vs. Pagano	
October 7, 2018	Relevos Increibles de Máscaras y Cabelleras	Aramís and Dragón Bane vs Demonio Infernal and Freelance	
October 14, 2018	IWRG show	Dragón Bane (c) vs. Aramís for the IWRG Rey del Aire Championship	
October 21, 2018	IWRG Show	Hechicero and El Hijo de Dos Caras vs. Cuervo de Puerto Rico and El Hijo de Pirata Morgan	
November 1, 2018	El Castillo del Terror (2018)	Tortuga Mike vs. Oficial Spector vs. Aramís vs. Diosa Atenea vs. Dragón Bane vs. El Hijo del Alebrije vs. El Hijo de Canis Lupus vs. Relámpago vs. Ludark Shaitan vs. Shil-Kah vs. Tortuga Leo vs. Zumbi in a Lucha de Apuestassteel cage match	
November 3, 2018	Invasion Extranejra	Athoz Montanez, Cuervo de Puerto Rico, Demetrio El Gladiador, Heddi Karaoui, Hip Hop Man, Mosca, Pierre Montanez, and Zumbi vs Eterno, El Hijo del Alebrije, Imposible, Mr. Electro, Relámpago, Rokambole Jr., Tortuga Leo, and Villano V	
November 11, 2018	75. Torneo Fill	Alas de Acero, Apolo, Chris Stone Jr., Iron Kid, Kalibus, Manchitas, Psique, and Sairus vs. Chef Benito, Chicanito, El Diablo Jr., Fireman, Guerrero 2000, Lunatic Xtreme, Puma de Oro, and Shadow Boy in a lucha de apuestas steel cage match	
November 15, 2018	Triangular en Jaula	Rush vs. L.A. Park vs. Penta 0M in a steel cage match	
November 18, 2018	IWRG Show	Imposible (c) vs. Eterno for the IWRG Intercontinental Middleweight Championship	
November 21, 2018	IWRG Show	Rokambole Jr. and Villano V Jr. (c) vs. Capo del Norte and Capo del Sur for the IWRG Intercontinental Tag Team Championship	
December 2, 2018	56th Anniversary of Lucha Libre in Estado de México	Capo Del Norte, Capo Del Sur and Máscara Año 2000 Jr. vs. Rokambole Jr., Villano IV and Villano V Jr.	
December 9, 2018	IWRG Show	Aramís, Rokambole Jr. and Villano V Jr. vs. Dragon Bane, Sinn Bodhi and Último Gladiador	
December 16, 2018	76. Torneo FILL	Black Dragon, Dragon Bane and Toto vs. Black Lancer, Maquina Infernal and Shaolin	
December 21, 2018	Arena Naucalpan 41st Anniversary Show	L.A. Park and El Hijo de L.A. Park vs. Dr. Wagner Jr. and El Hijo de Dr. Wagner Jr.	

== See also ==
- 2018 in professional wrestling
