= List of IWRG shows in 2017 =

2017 events by International Wrestling Revolution Group

2017

International Wrestling Revolution Group shows chronology
| ← Previous; 2016 | Next → 2018 |

The Mexican Lucha libre, or professional wrestling promotion International Wrestling Revolution Group (IWRG) has produced and scripted a number of wrestling shows since their creation on January 1, 1996, by promoter Adolfo "Pirata" Moreno. In 2017, IWRG held a total of 77 shows, an average of 1.48 shows per week, all in Arena Naucalpan. On thirteen occasions the main event of the show was a championship match and on nine occasions the main event was a Lucha de Apuestas, or "bet match". (Note: All statistics are supported by the individual sources in the table.)

== 2017 events ==
| Date | Event | Main Event | Ref. |
|---|---|---|---|
| January 1, 2017 | Prisión Fatal / 21st Anniversary | Imposible vs. Golden Magic vs. Pirata Morgan Jr. vs. Relámpago in a steel cage match | |
| January 7, 2017 | IWRG Show | Pirata Morgan vs. Mr. Electro | |
| January 15, 2017 | IWRG Show | Imposible vs. Relámpago vs. Apolo Estrada Jr., Lucha de Apuestas - IWRG Intercontinental Middleweight Championship vs. Mask vs. Mask | |
| January 22, 2017 | IWRG Show | Imposible vs. Relámpago for the IWRG Intercontinental Middleweight Championship | |
| January 25, 2017 | Torneo FILL LVI | Legion Extranjera (Dowki, Heddi Karaoui, Hip Hop Man, Mosca, Picudo Jr., Taylor Wolf, Yakuza) vs. Team FILL (Aramís, Black Dragón, Demonio Infernal, Emperador Azteca, Eterno, Freelance, El Hijo del Alebrije) in a torneo cibernetico | |
| February 1, 2017 | IWRG Show | Chicano, El Hijo del Alebrije and El Imposible vs. Cerebro Negro, Demonio Infernal and Eterno | |
| February 5, 2017 | IWRG Show | Mr. Electro and Pirata Morgan vs. Golden Magic and Pirata Morgan Jr. in a Relevos Suicidas match | |
| February 8, 2017 | IWRG Show | Los Exoticos (Demasiado, Diva Salvaje, Miss Gaviota and Nigma Vs. Los Tortugas Ninjas (Leo, Mike, Rafy and Teelo) | |
| February 12, 2017 | Máscara vs. Cabellera | Golden Magic vs. Pirata Morgan Jr., Lucha de Apuestas, mask vs. hair match | |
| February 15, 2017 | IWRG Show | Cerebro Negro, Demonio Infernal and Relámpago vs. Apolo Estrada Jr., Eterno and Heddi Karaoui | |
| February 19, 2017 | El Protector | Black Terry and El Diablo Jr. I vs. Demonio Infernal and Negro Navarro in an El Protector tournament final | |
| February 22, 2017 | IWRG Show | Demonio Infernal, El Diablo Jr. I and Relámpago vs. Emperador Azteca, Golden Magic and Imposible | |
| February 26, 2017 | Copa Higher Power | El Pantera II vs Danny Casas vs. Imposible vs. Máscara Año 2000 Jr. and Mr. Electro vs. Negro Navarro vs. Pirata Morgan vs El Solar vs. Trauma I vs. Villano IV | |
| March 1, 2017 | Torneo FILL LVII | Gym FILL (Black Terry, Araña de Plata Jr., Alfa, Alas de Acero, Aramís, Black Dragon, Skanda, Shadow Boy and Adrenalina) vs. Gym Deportivo Miguel Hidalgo (Freelance, Neza Kid, Lunatik Fly, Lunatik Extreme, Lunatik Boy, Fandango Leguna Azul, Black Warrior Jr., Tomba and Quetzal) | |
| March 5, 2017 | Triangular de la Muerte | Chicano vs.Veneno vs. Danny Casas, in a Lucha de Apuestas, hair vs. hair vs. hair match | |
| March 12, 2017 | IWRG Show | Máscara Año 2000 Jr., Mr. Electro and El Tigre del Ring vs. Herodes Jr., Silver King and Trauma I | |
| March 15, 2017 | IWRG Show | Demonio Infernal, Relámpago and Heddi Karaoui vs. Emperador Azteca, Freelance and Pantera I | |
| March 19, 2017 | Rebelión de los Juniors | 10-man Rebelión de los Juniors tournament | |
| March 22, 2017 | IWRG Show | Freelance, Golden Magic and Imposible vs. Cerebro Negro, Heddi Karaoui and Relámpago | |
| March 29, 2017 | IWRG Show | Golden Magic Veneno vs. Máscara Año 2000 Jr. and Relámpago | |
| April 2, 2017 | IWRG Show | Súper Mega and Los Traumas (Trauma I and Trauma II) vs. Freelance, Heddi Karaoui and Veneno | |
| April 5, 2017 | IWRG Show | El Pantera I (c) vs. Demonio Infernal for the IWRG Intercontinental Lightweight Championship | |
| April 9, 2017 | IWRG Show | Las Piratas del Caribe (El Hijo del Pirata Morgan, Pirata Morgan and Pirata Morgan Jr.) vs. Dr. Cerebro, Heddi Karaoui and Herodes Jr. | |
| April 16, 2017 | Guerra del Golfo | Máscara Año 2000 Jr. vs. Veneno vs. Freelance in a Lucha de Apuestas steel cage match | |
| April 23, 2017 | IWRG Show | Black Terry and El Diablo Jr.(c) vs Los Traumas (Trauma I and Trauma II) for the IWRG Intercontinental Tag Team Championship | |
| April 26, 2017 | Torneo FILL LVIII | Villano III Jr. vs. Acero vs. Alas de Acero vs. Aramís vs. Black Dragón vs. Black Lancer vs. Demonio Infernal vs. El Diablo Jr. vs. El Hijo del Clímax vs. El Hijo del Villano III vs. Kanon vs. Kortiz vs. La Máquina Infernal vs. Shadow Boy vs. El Tackle vs. Zhalon | |
| April 30, 2017 | IWRG Show | La Dinastía de la Muerte (Negro Navarro, Trauma I and Trauma II) (c) vs. Los Terribles Cerebros (Black Terry, Cerebro Negro and Dr. Cerebro) for the IWRG Intercontinental Trios Championship | |
| May 3, 2017 | IWRG Show | Kortiz, Villano III Jr. and Villano IV vs. Black Terry, Demonio Infernal and El Diablo Jr. | |
| May 7, 2017 | IWRG Show | Mosca (c) vs Dragón Fly for the IWRG Intercontinental Welterweight Championship | |
| May 14, 2017 | Rey del Ring | 2017 Rey del Ring tournament | |
| May 17, 2017 | Torneo FILL LIX | Aramís vs. Ángel Oriental vs. Aspirantito Jr. vs. Black Dragón vs. Boxter vs. Demonio Infernal vs. El Diablo Jr. vs. Fandango vs. Kaiser Dragón vs. Kanon vs. Kilvan vs. Kronoz vs. Power Bull vs. Toxin vs. Tromba vs. Yoruba | |
| May 21, 2017 | IWRG Show | Danny Casas, Imposible and Mr. Electro vs. Black Warrior and Los Traumas (Trauma I and Trauma II) | |
| May 28, 2017 | IWRG Show | Black Warrior and Súper Mega vs. Los Traumas (Trauma I and Trauma II) | |
| June 4, 2017 | IWRG Show | Imposible (c) vs. Súper Mega for the IWRG Rey del Ring Championship | |
| June 11, 2017 | IWRG Show | Black Warrior and Los Oficiales (Oficial AK-47 and Oficial Fierro) vs. Imposible and Los Traumas (Trauma I and Trauma II) | |
| June 14, 2017 | IWRG Show | Cerebro Negro, Demonio Infernal and Súper Mega vs Centvrion, Eterno and Obett | |
| June 18, 2017 | IWRG Show | El Hijo del Dr. Wagner Jr. and Los Oficiales (Oficial AK-47 and Oficial Fierro) vs. Súper Mega and Los Piratas (El Hijo de Pirata Morgan and Pirata Morgan) | |
| June 21, 2017 | Torneo FILL LX | Gym FILL (Ángel Oriental, Aramís, Atomic Star, Black Dragón, Demonio Infernal, El Diablo Jr., Dinamic Black and Power Bull) vs. Gym Cuatitlan (Aeroboy, Alex Pain, Centella Salazar, Danny Barrio, Homonimo, Payachucho, Stone Magic and Último Conde) | |
| June 25, 2017 | 3 Cabelleras vs. 3 Cabelleras | Los Oficiales (Oficial 911, Oficial AK-47 and Oficial Fierro) vs. Los Piratas (Pirata Morgan, Pirata Morgan Jr. and El Hijo de Pirata Morgan in a 3 vs. 3 Lucha de Apuestas match | |
| July 2, 2017 | Festival de las Máscaras | Los Villanos (Villano III Jr., Villano IV and Villano V Jr.) vs Los Misioneros de la Muerte (Negro Navarro, Texano Jr. and Trauma II) | |
| July 5, 2017 | IWRG Show | Cerebro Negro, Dragon Yuki and Obett vs. Los Panteras (El Hijo del Pantera and Pantera II and Emperador Azteca | |
| July 9, 2017 | IWRG Show | Los Traumas (Trauma I and Trauma II) and Black Warrior vs. Mr. Electro, Villano III Jr. and Villano V Jr. | |
| July 16, 2017 | IWRG Show | Mr. Electro (c) vs. Black Warrior for the IWRG Intercontinental Heavyweight Championship] | |
| July 19, 2017 | IWRG Show | Cerebro Negro, Eterno and El Hijo del Pantera vs. Black Dragón, Dinamic Black and Dragón Fly | |
| July 23, 2017 | Prisión Fatal | Carístico vs. Trauma II vs. Mr. Electro vs. Black Warrior in a steel cage match | |
| July 26, 2017 | Copa Higher Power | Alas de Acero, Aramís, Black Dragón, Demonio Infernal, Diablo Jr., Dinamic Black, Emperador Azteca and Eterno vs. Indy Nation (Arez, Fly Star, Fly Warrior, Fulgor I, Fulgor II, Glenn Calavera, Mr. Leo and Séptimo Rayo) | |
| July 30, 2017 | Legado Final | Villano IV and Villano V Jr. vs. El Hijo de Pirata Morgan and Pirata Morgan vs. El Hijo del Pantera and Pantera vs. Black Warrior and Warrior Jr. vs. Diablo Jr. and El Hijo del Diablo vs. Trauma I and Negro Navarro vs. Golden Magic and Mr. Magia vs. Bombero Infernal and Bombero Infernal Jr. | |
| August 2, 2017 | IWRG Show | Dinamic Dragons (Black Dragón, Dinamic Black and Dragón Fly vs. Los Mariacho Locos (Diablo Jr., El Hijo del Diablo and Imposible) | |
| August 6, 2017 | IWRG Show | Black Warrior and Warrior Jr. vs. El Hijo de Pirata Morgan and Pirata Morgan | |
| August 9, 2017 | IWRG Show | Emperador Azteca (c) vs. Arez for the IWRG Intercontinental Welterweight Championship | |
| August 13, 2017 | Máscara vs. Máscara | Black Dragón vs. Gallo Frances | |
| August 20, 2017 | La Gran Cruzada | 30 Man Battle Royal | |
| August 23, 2017 | Torneo FILL 62 | Gym FILL vs Gym Cuautitlan | |
| August 28, 2017 | IWRG Show | Mr. Electro (c) vs. Villano V Jr. for the IWRG Intercontinental Heavyweight Championship | |
| August 30, 2017 | IWRG Show | Indy Nation (Arez, Fly Warrior and Séptimo Rayo) vs. Dragón Fly, Emperador Azteca and Imposible | |
| September 3, 2017 | Cabellera vs. Cabellera | Eterno vs. Bombero Infernal in a Lucha de Apuestas, hair vs. hair match | |
| September 10, 2017 | IWRG Show | Eterno, Súper Mega and Trauma II vs. Imposible, Villano III Jr. and Villano V Jr. | |
| September 17, 2017 | Caravana de Campeones | Black Warrior and Warrior Jr. (c) vs. Herodes Jr. and Máscara Año 2000 Jr. for the IWRG Intercontinental Tag Team Championship | |
| September 24, 2017 | IWRG Show | Herodes Jr. (c) vs. Máscara Año 2000 Jr. for the IWRG Junior de Juniors Championship | |
| September 27, 2017 | Guerra de Escuelas | Gym FILL vs Indy Nation vs Gym Zeus | |
| October 1, 2017 | IWRG Show | Eterno (c) vs. Bombero Infernal for the IWRG Intercontinental Middleweight Championship | |
| October 8, 2017 | IWRG Show | El Hijo de Dos Caras, Máscara Año 2000 Jr. and Veneno vs Black Warrior, Pirata Morgan and Warrior Jr. | |
| October 11, 2017 | IWRG Show | Eterno, Trauma I and Trauma II vs. Indy Nation (Arez, Centvrión, Séptimo Rayo) | |
| October 15, 2017 | IWRG Show | Capo Del Norte, Capo Del Sur, Máscara Año 2000 Jr. vs. Bombero Infernal, El Hijo de Dos Caras and Veneno | |
| October 22, 2017 | IWRG Show | Capo Del Norte, Capo Del Sur, Máscara Año 2000 Jr. vs. Bombero Infernal, Imposible and Mr. Electro | |
| October 25, 2017 | Campal FILL de Mascaras de Maestros y Aluminos | Indy Nation vs. Arena Lopez Mateos vs. Gym Zeus vs. Gym Metropolitano vs. Gym FILL vs. Gym Cerbero vs. Gym Rivera vs. Gym LLBoom vs. Gym Pista Pebellon vs. Gym Argentina vs. Gym Querétaro | |
| October 29, 2017 | En Relevos Sangriento | Capo Del Norte and Capo Del Sur vs. Trauma I and Trauma II | |
| November 2, 2017 | Castillo del Terror | 10 man Lucha de Apuestas steel cage match | |
| November 5, 2017 | IWRG Show | Capo Del Norte, Capo Del Sur and Máscara Año 2000 Jr. vs. Emperador Azteca, Villano IV and Villano V Jr. | |
| November 15, 2017 | IWRG Show | Cerebro Negro, Oficial 911 and Villano V Jr. vs. Eterno, Trauma I and Trauma II | |
| November 26, 2017 | IWRG Show | Mr. Electro, Trauma I and Trauma II vs Fandango, Villano IV and Villano V Jr. | |
| November 29, 2017 | Tornero FILL | Gym FILL Vs. Gym Zeus | |
| December 3, 2017 | 55th Anniversary of Lucha Libre in Estado de México | Ray Mendoza Jr. vs. Mr. Electro in a Lucha de Apuestas, hair vs. hair match | |
| December 10, 2017 | IWRG Show | Los Piratos (El Hijo de Pirata Morgan, Pirata Morgan and Pirata Morgan Jr.) vs. Capo Del Norte, Capo Del Sur and Máscara Año 2000 Jr. | |
| December 17, 2017 | Arena Naucalpan 40th Anniversary Show | Oficial Spector vs. Black Dragón in a Lucha de Apuestas, mask vs. mask match | |
| December 20, 2017 | Torneo FILL Maestros vs. Aluminos | Maestros Vs. Aluminos torneo cibernetico | |
| December 25, 2017 | IWRG Show | El Hijo de Dos Caras, La Parka and Veneno vs Eterno, Monster Clown and Murder Clown | |

== See also ==
- 2017 in professional wrestling
