= List of IWRG shows in 2015 =

2015 events by International Wrestling Revolution Group

2015

International Wrestling Revolution Group shows chronology
← Previous; 2014	Next → 2016

The Mexican Lucha libre, or professional wrestling promotion International Wrestling Revolution Group (IWRG) has produced and scripted a number of wrestling shows since their creation on January 1, 1996, by promoter Adolfo "Pirata" Moreno. In 2015, IWRG held a total of 77 shows, an average of 1.48 shows per week, all in Arena Naucalpan. On twelve occasions the main event of the show was a championship match and on six occasions the main event was a Lucha de Apuestas, or "bet match". (Note: All statistics are supported by the individual sources in the table.)

== 2015 events ==
Date	Event	Main Event	Ref(s)
January 1, 2015	IWRG 19th Anniversary Show	El Hijo de Dos Caras, Máscara Sagrada and Pantera vs. Monsther, Pirata Morgan and El Hijo del Pirata Morgan	
January 4, 2015	IWRG Show	El Hijo de Dos Caras, Relampago and Súper Nova vs. Chicano, Danny Casas and Hijo de Máscara Año 2000	
January 11, 2015	IWRG Show	Hijo de Máscara Año 2000 vs. El Hijo de Dos Caras (c) for the IWRG Rey del Ring Championship	
January 18, 2015	IWRG Show	Chicano, Danny Casas, El Hijo de Dos Caras and Súper Nova vs. Canis Lupus, Eterno, Hijo de Máscara Año 2000 and Universo 2000 Jr.	
January 21, 2015	Torneo FILL 38	Aguila Tapada, Manchas, Mara Salva Trucha, Mr. Tatuaje, Super Pinocho 3000, Tigre Americano, Tigre Nahual and Vengador Galactico vs. Alfa, Atomic Star, Avisman, Electro Boy, Imposible, Metaleon, Power Bull and Sky Angel in a torneo cibernetico	
January 25, 2015	IWRG Show	Chicano and Danny Casas vs. Canis Lupus and Eterno (c) for the IWRG Intercontinental Tag Team Championship	
February 1, 2015	IWRG Show	Eterno vs. Chicano in a hair vs. hair Lucha de Apuestas	
February 8, 2015	IWRG Show	Los Primos Dinamitas (Hijo de Máscara Año 2000 and Universo 2000 Jr.) vs. Chicano and Danny Casas	
February 15, 2015	El Protector	Chicano and Danny Casas vs. Los Primos Dinamitas (Hijo del Máscara Año 2000 and Universo 2000 Jr.) for the IWRG Intercontinental Tag Team Championship	
February 18, 2015	Torneo FILL 39	Alfa, Atomic Star, Electro Boy, Imposible, Metaleon, Power Bull and Sky Angel vs. Manchas, Mara Salva Trucha, Mr. Tatuaje, Mr. Zebra, Super Pinocho 3000, Tigre Americano, Tigre Nahual and Vengador Galactico in a torneo cibernetico	
February 22, 2015	IWRG Show	Hijo de Máscara Año 2000, Pirata Morgan and Universo 2000 Jr. vs. Chicano, Danny Casas and Máscara Sagrada	
March 1, 2015	Rebelión de los Juniors	El Hijo de Dos Caras vs. Apolo Estrada Jr. vs. Danny Casas vs. Golden Magic vs. El Hijo del Diablo vs. Hijo del Máscara Año 2000 vs. Pirata Morgan Jr. vs. Universo 2000 Jr.	
March 4, 2015	La Fortaleza	12-man Lucha de Apuestas steel cage match	
March 11, 2015	IWRG Show	Emperador Azteca, Eterno and Súper Nova vs. Ludxor, Nino Hamburguesa and Venum	
March 15, 2015	Guerra del Golfo	X-Fly vs. Danny Casas in a Lucha de Apuestas steel cage match	
March 18, 2015	Torneo FILL 40	Alfa vs. Avisman vs. Centinela Azul vs. Electro Boy vs. Fly Star vs. Fly Warrior vs. Gato Aldana vs. Kaiser Dragon vs. Komanchi vs. Manchas vs. Mara Salva Trucha vs. Metaleon vs. Mini Zumbido vs. Mr. Zebra vs. Omega vs. Power Bull vs. Skiller vs. Sky Angel vs. Tigre Nahual vs. Toxin Boy vs. Vengador Galactico vs. Atomic Star in a Lucha de Apuestas Steel cage match	
March 22, 2015	IWRG Show	El Hijo de Dos Caras (c) vs. Pirata Morgan for the IWRG Intercontinental Heavyweight Championship	
March 29, 2015	IWRG Show	Negro Navarro and Pirata Morgan vs. El Hijo de Dos Caras and Máscara Sagrada	
April 5, 2015	Rey del Ring	30 man Rey del Ring tournament	
April 12, 2015	IWRG Show	El Hijo de Dos Caras (c) vs. Negro Navarro for the IWRG Intercontinental Heavyweight Championship	
April 16, 2015	IWRG Show	El Hijo de Dos Caras, Myzteziz and Ricky Cruz vs. Cibernético, Electroshock and Hijo de Máscara Año 2000	
April 19, 2015	Ruleta de la Muerte	Ricky Cruz vs. Veneno vs. X-Fly vs. Eterno	
April 26, 2015	IWRG Show	Ricky Cruz vs. Pirata Morgan for the IWRG Rey del Ring Championship	
April 30, 2015	Torneo FILL 41	Atomic Fly, Espada de Plata, Fly Star, Kaiser Dragon, Komachi, Mini Zumbido, Skiller and Toxin Boy vs. Arana de Plata, Atomic Star, Dragon Celestial, Dragon Fly, Electro Boy, Imposible, Power Bull and Shadow Boy in a torneo cibernetico	
May 3, 2015	Festival de las Máscaras	Black Tiger III, Cien Caras Jr. and Hijo del Máscara Año 2000 vs. Chicano, Dr. Wagner Jr. and El Hijo de Dos Caras	
May 17, 2015	Guerra Revolucionaria	20-Man Battle Royal	
May 24, 2015	IWRG Show	Cien Caras Jr., Hijo de Máscara Año 2000 and Negro Navarro vs. El Pantera, Máscara Sagrada and Veneno	
May 31, 2015	IWRG Show	Máscara Sagrada, Veneno and X-Fly vs. Canis Lupus, Cien Caras Jr. and Eterno	
June 3, 2015	Torneo FILL 42	Alas de Acero, Aramís, Black Angel, Black Drago, Desgarrador, Kanon, Shadow Black and Sniper vs. Aeroman, Arana de Plata, Atomic Star, Dragon Celestial, Electro Boy, Imposible, Matrix Jr. and Power Bull in a torneo cibernetico	
June 7, 2015	La Jaula de Las Locas	La Diva Salvaje vs. Bello Caligula vs. Chica Yeye vs. Cristal vs. Diosa Atenea vs. El Demasiado vs. Estrella Divina vs. Miss Gaviota vs. Sexy Girl vs. Vaneliin an intergender ten-person Lucha de Apuestas steel cage match	
June 10, 2015	Guerra de Escuelas	Gym Eterno (Aramís, Atomic Star and Eterno) vs. Gym FILL (Aeroman, Black Terry and Dragón Celestial)	
June 14, 2015	IWRG Show	Heddi Karaoui, Pirata Morgan and Silver Cain vs. El Pantera, Masamune and Veneno	
June 17, 2015	IWRG Show	El Canek, El Pantera I and Myzteziz vs. Averno, Dr. Wagner Jr. and Fuerza Guerrera	
June 21, 2015	IWRG Show	Veneno (c) vs. Heddi Karaoui for the IWRG Intercontinental Middleweight Championship	
June 24, 2015	IWRG Show	Eterno vs. Black Terry	
June 28, 2015	IWRG Show	Canis Lupus and Los Crazy Americans (Coloso Chris and Principe Orion) vs. El Hijo de Dos Caras, El Pantera and Veneno	
July 1, 2015	IWRG Show	Alas de Acero, Aramís, Atomic Star, Black Angel, Chapulin, Kanon, Rayo Star and Super Jack vs. Brazo Cibernetico Jr., Caballero de Plata, Dr. Letal, Fiero, Maquiavelico, Meteoro, Sonic and Voraz in a torneo cibernetico	
July 5, 2015	Guerra de Familias	Crazy Americans (Coloso Chris and Príncipe Orión) vs. Danny Casas and Veneno	
July 8, 2015	IWRG Show	Atomic Fly, Espada de Plata, Fly Star, Kaiser Dragon, Skiler, Toxin Boy, Wasson and Yoruba vs. Brazo Cibernetico Jr., Caballero de Plata, Dr. Letal, Maquiavelico, Meteoro, Solaris, Sonic and Voraz in a torneo cibernetico	
July 14, 2015	IWRG Show	Canis Lupus and Crazy Americans (Coloso Chris and Principe Orion) vs. Danny Casas, Súper Nova and Veneno	
July 19, 2015	IWRG Show	IWRG Intercontinental Tag Team Championship tournament	
July 26, 2015	IWRG Show	La Dinastia de la Muerte (Negro Navarro, Trauma I and Trauma II) vs. Canis Lupus and Los Crazy Americans (Coloso Chris and Principe Orion)	
July 29, 2015	Torneo FILL 44	Draego, El Brujo, El Principe, Omega, Rayman, Roberto Paz Jr., Rudy Santana and Smaker vs. Alas de Acero, Aramís, Arana de Plata, Atomic Star, Chapulin, Electro Boy, Fresero Jr. and Kanon in a torneo cibernetico	
August 2, 2015	Legado Final	Dragón Celestial and El Hijo del Diablo vs. El Hijo del Solar and El Solar vs. El Hijo del Pantera and El Pantera vs. Pirata Morgan Jr. and Pirata Morgan vs. Universo 2000 Jr. and Universo 2000 vs. Hijo de Máscara Año 2000 and Cien Caras Jr.	
August 5, 2015	IWRG Show	Alas de Acero, Aramís, and Eterno vs. Oficial 911, Espada de Plata and Kaiser Dragon	
August 9, 2015	IWRG Show	La Dinastia de la Muerte (Negro Navarro, Trauma I and Trauma II) vs Los Piratas (El Hijo de Pirata Morgan, Pirata Morgan and Pirata Morgan Jr.) (c) for the IWRG Intercontinental Trios Championship	
August 12, 2015	IWRG Show	Oficial 911, Oficial AK-47 and Marduk vs. Alas de Acero, Canis Lupus and Eterno	
August 19, 2015	Triangular de la Muerte	Atomic Star (C), Canis Lupus and Eterno vs. Black Terry, Dr Cerebro and Eternus (C) vs. Oficial 911, AK47 and Pikachu (C) in a Trios Captains Mask Vs. Mask Vs. Hair Three Way Match	
August 23, 2015	IWRG Show	Canis Lupus, El Hijo del Dr. Wagner Jr. and Pagano vs. LA Par-K and Las Traumas (Trauma I and Trauma II)	
August 30, 2015	IWRG Show	Los Piratas (Barba Roja Jr., El Hijo de Pirata Morgan and Pirata Morgan) vs. Black Terry, Negro Navarro and Trauma II	
September 2, 2015	IWRG Show	Oficial 911 vs. Eterno	
September 6, 2015	La Gran Cruzada	20-Man Battle Royal	
September 13, 2015	IWRG Show	Danny Casas, Máscara Sagrada and Veneno vs. Negro Navarro, Pirata Morgan and Shu El Guerrero	
September 16, 2015	IWRG Show	Las Traumas (Trauma I and Trauma II) and Los Gringos VIP (Apolo Estrada Jr. and El Hijo del Diablo) vs. El Hijo del Pantera and El Pantera (c) in a Steel cage match	
September 20, 2015	IWRG Show	Danny Casas, Heddi Karaoui and Veneno vs. La Dinastia de la Muerte (Negro Navarro, Trauma I and Trauma II)	
September 23, 2015	IWRG Show	Los Comandos (Comando Delta, Comando Gama, Comando Mega, Comando Stone and Rayan vs. Los Megas Mega, Omega, Super Mega and Ultra Mega) and Star Boy	
September 27, 2015	IWRG Show	Las Traumas (Trauma I and Trauma II) and Máscara Año 2000 Jr. vs. Danny Casas, El Hijo de Dos Caras and Veneno	
September 30, 2015	Torneo FILL 45	Aeroman, Black Drago, Blue Monsther, Dragon Fly, El Hijo del Alebrije, Matrix Jr. and Power Bull vs. Ekxux, Gigante Xandao, Guerrero del Espacio II, Guerrero del Espacio III, Magnetico II, Violencia Jr. and Voltan in a torneo cibernetico	
October 4, 2015	IWRG Show	Dr. Wagner Jr., El Hijo de Dos Caras and Heddi Karaoui vs. Máscara Año 2000 Jr., Negro Navarro and Trauma I	
October 7, 2015	IWRG Show	Los Megas (Mega, Omega, Super Mega and Ultra Mega) vs. Los Comandos (Comando Gama, Comando Mega, Comando Stone and Oficial Rayan	
October 11, 2015	Caravana de Campeones	El Hijo de Dos Caras (c) vs. Máscara Año 2000 Jr. for the IWRG Intercontinental Heavyweight Championship	
October 18, 2015	IWRG Show	Dr. Wagner Jr., El Hijo del Dr. Wagner Jr. and Golden Magic vs. LA Par-K and Las Traumas (Trauma I and Trauma II)	
October 25, 2015	IWRG Show	Heddi Karaoui vs. Veneno (c) for the IWRG Intercontinental Middleweight Championship	
October 28, 2015	IWRG Show	Angel Dorado, Angel Dorado Jr., Cruz del Silencio, Emperador Sayri, Hades, Rene Rocks and Toro Machine vs. Alas de Acero, Aramís, Black Drago, Dragon Fly, El Hijo del Alebrije, Kanon and Power Bull in a torneo cibernetico	
November 1, 2015	El Castillo del Terror	11-Man Lucha de Apuestas steel cage match	
November 4, 2015	IWRG Show	Black Terry, El Hijo del Alebrije and Latigo vs. Atomic Star, Eterno and Kanon	
November 8, 2015	IWRG Show	El Hijo del Solitario, El Hijo de Dos Caras and Veneno vs. Canis Lupus, Máscara Año 2000 Jr. and Pirata Morgan	
November 15, 2015	IWRG Show	Danny Casas, El Pantera and Súper Nova vs. Heddi Karaoui, Máscara Año 2000 Jr. and X-Fly	
November 18, 2015	IWRG Show	Canis Lupus, Oficial Spector and Violencia Jr. vs. Fresero Jr., Mega and Ultra Mega	
November 22, 2015	IWRG Show	Danny Casas, Toscano and Veneno vs. Engendro Jr., Relampago and X-Fly	
November 25, 2015	IWRG Show	Black Terry vs. Eterno	
November 29, 2015	Ruleta de la Muerte	Danny Casas vs. Trauma I vs. Trauma II vs. X-Fly vs. Diva Salvaje vs. Máscara Año 2000 Jr. vs. Toscano vs. Veneno in a Ruleta de la Muerte tournament	
December 6, 2015	IWRG Show	Las Traumas (Trauma I and Trauma II) and Máscara Año 2000 Jr. vs. El Hijo de Dos Caras, Toscano and Veneno	
December 13, 2015	IWRG Show	Canis Lupus, Máscara Año 2000 Jr., Pirata Morgan and X-Fly vs. Danny Casas, El Hijo de Dos Caras, Mr. 450 and Veneno	
December 16, 2015	53rd Anniversary of Lucha Libre in Estadio de Mexico	La Familia de Tijuana (Damián 666, Halloween and X-Fly) vs. Argos, Crazy Boy and Danny Casas	
December 20, 2015	Arena Naucalpan 38th Anniversary Show	Los Insoportables (Eterno and Apolo Estrada Jr.) vs. Los Terribles Cerebros (Black Terry and Dr. Cerebro) in a Luchas de Apuestas. hair vs. hair. match	
December 27, 2015	IWRG Show	Los Terribles Cerebros (Black Terry, Cerebro Negro and Dr Cerebro) (c) vs. Canis Lupus and Los Insoportables (Apolo Estrada Jr. and Eterno) for the Distrito Federal Trios Championship	

== See also ==
- 2015 in professional wrestling
