= IWRG Cabellera vs. Cabellera (July 2016) =

2016 International Wrestling Revolution Group event

- Promotion: International Wrestling Revolution Group
- Date: July 17, 2016 (aired July 18, 2016 (AYM Mexico))
- City: Naucalpan, State of Mexico
- Venue: Arena Naucalpan

Event chronology
← Previous; Festival de las Máscaras	Next → Máscara vs. Máscara

IWRG Lucha de Apuestas chronology
← Previous; April 2016	Next → August 2016

The IWRG Cabellera vs. Cabellera (July 2016) show (Spanish for "hair versus hair") was a professional wrestling supercard event produced by Mexican professional wrestling promotion International Wrestling Revolution Group (IWRG), and took place on July 17, 2016, in Arena Naucalpan, Naucalpan, State of Mexico, Mexico. The focal point of the Caballera vs. Caballera series of shows is one or more traditional Lucha de Apuestas, or "Bet matches", where all competitors in the match risk their hair on the outcome of the match. The Lucha de Apuestas is considered the most prestigious match type in lucha libre, especially when a wrestlers mask is on the line, but the "hair vs. hair" stipulation is held in almost as high regard.

For the July 2016 Caballera vs. Caballera main event IWRG Intercontinental Heavyweight Champion Mr. Electro faced off against long-time rival Máscara Año 2000 Jr. Mr. Electro lost the match and as a result, had his hair shaved off afterward. In the semi-final match Trauma I lost to rival Canis Lupus in a match where the storyline was that the winner would win 50.000,00 MEX. In the fourth match of the night El Hijo de Dos Caras defeated Danny Casas to win the IWRG Junior de Juniors Championship.

== Production ==
=== Background ===
In Lucha libre the wrestling mask holds a sacred place, with the most anticipated and prestigious matches being those where a wrestler's mask is on the line, a so-called Lucha de Apuestas, or "bet match" where the loser would be forced to unmask in the middle of the ring and state their birth name. Winning a mask is considered a bigger accomplishment in lucha libre than winning a professional wrestling championship and usually draws more people and press coverage. Losing a mask is often a watershed moment in a wrestler's career, they give up the mystique and prestige of being an enmascarado (masked wrestler) but usually come with a higher than usual payment from the promoter.

=== Storylines ===
The event featured six professional wrestling matches with different wrestlers involved in pre-existing scripted feuds, plots and storylines. Wrestlers were portrayed as either heels (referred to as rudos in Mexico, those that portray the "bad guys") or faces (técnicos in Mexico, the "good guy" characters) as they followed a series of tension-building events, which culminated in a wrestling match or series of matches.

== Event ==
The opening match saw rookies Dragón Fly and The Tiger defeated Demonio Infernal and Skanda. It appeared that Demonio Infernal was only pinned for a two count, but the referee continued anyway. In the second match Las Tortugas Ninja (Leo, Mike and Rafy) defended the Distrito Federal Trios Championship for the second time in their reign, against Los Insoportables ("The Undesirable"; Apolo Estrada Jr., Eterno, and Relámpago. Las Tortugas won the third and deciding fall to retain their championship. The third math saw the tecnico team of Chicano, Pantera, and Veneno defeated the trio of Herodes Jr., Toscano, and Trauma I where the focal point of the match was an ongoing storyline feud between Veneno and Trauma II.

Danny Casas defended the IWRG Junior de Juniors Championship for the first time since he won it four months prior. During the math El Hijo de Dos Caras made it clear that he was now portraying a rudo as he cheated to win both the first and third fall to win the championship. The semi-final match continued to build on a long-running storyline feud between Trauma I and Canis Lupus that had been going on for months prior. For the match, IWRG made it a one fall match, where the winner supposedly would get 50.000 pesos. In the end, Trauma I was disqualified as the referee saw him foul Canis Lupus.

The main event Lucha de Apuestas match between Máscara Año 2000 Jr. and Mr. Electro immediately turned into a brawl between the two rivals, leading to both wrestlers bleeding profusely by the end of the match. Mr. Electro won the first fall, with Máscara Año 2000 Jr. winning the second to push the match to a third and deciding fall. During the last fall, both wrestlers used a beer bottle as a weapon, accidentally knocking the referee down. Moments later Máscara Año 2000 Jr. broke the bottle over Mr. Electro's head and pinned him as a second referee ran to the ring to count to three.

== Results ==
No.	Results	Stipulations
1	Dragón Fly and The Tiger defeated Demonio Infernal and Skanda	Best two-out-of-three falls tag team match
2	Los Tortugas Ninja (Leo, Mike, and Rafy) (C) defeated Apolo Estrada Jr., Eterno, and Relámpago	Best two-out-of-three falls six-man "Lucha Libre rules" tag team match of the Distrito Federal Trios Championship
3	Chicano, Pantera, and Veneno defeated Herodes Jr., Toscano, and Trauma I	Best two-out-of-three falls six-man "Lucha Libre rules" tag team match
4	El Hijo de Dos Caras defeated Danny Casas (C)	Singles match for the IWRG Junior de Juniors Championship
5	Canis Lupus defeated Trauma I by disqualification	Singles match
6	Máscara Año 2000 Jr. defeated Mr. Electro	Best two-out-of-three falls Lucha de Apuestas, hair vs. hair match
