= IWRG Lucha de Apuestas =

International Wrestling Revolution Group event series

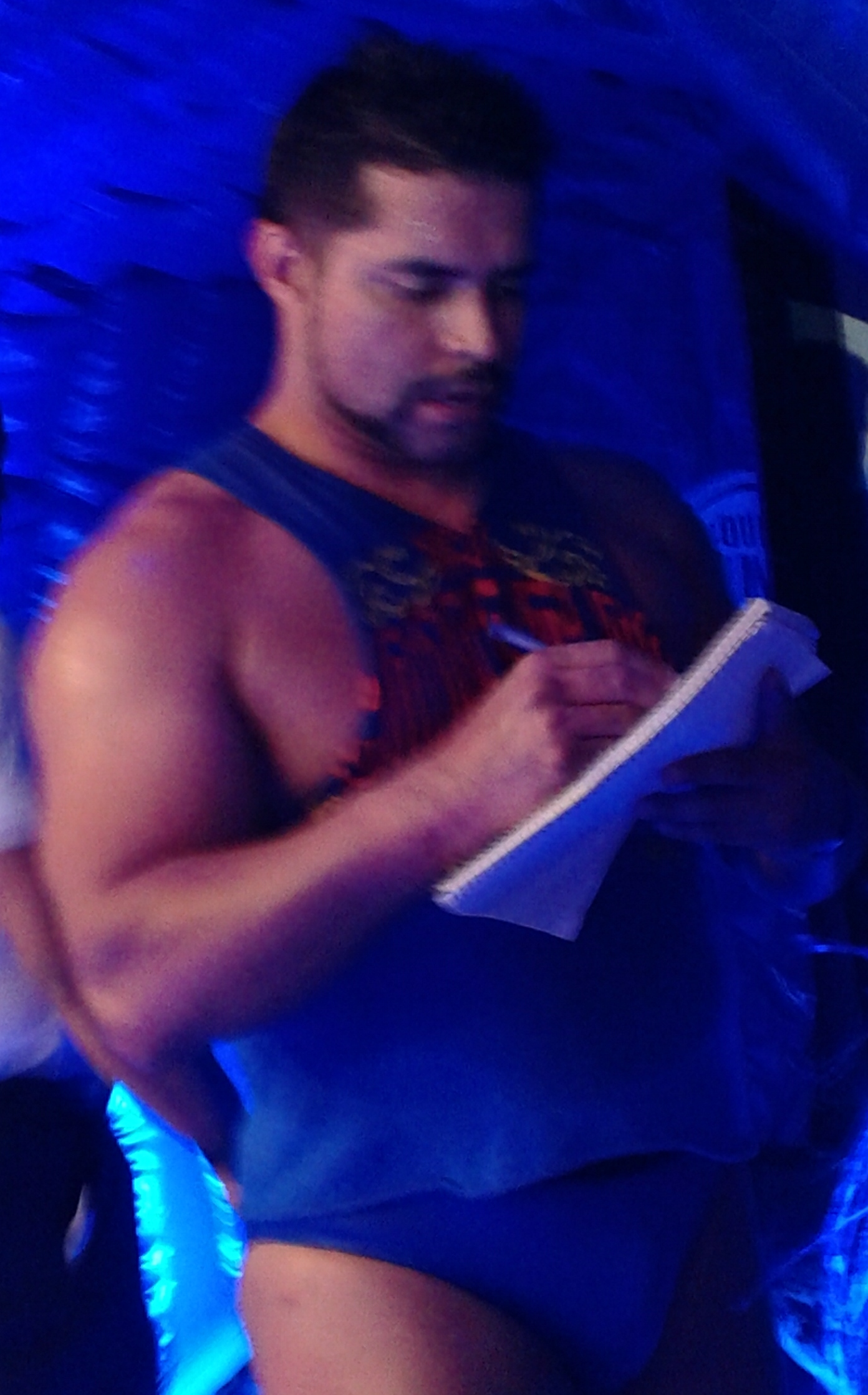
Máscara Año 2000 Jr., lost his hair in July 2016.

IWRG Luchas de Apuestas (Spanish for "Bet Match") is a series of professional wrestling Supercard shows, scripted and produced by the lucha libre wrestling company International Wrestling Revolution Group (IWRG; sometimes also referred to as Grupo Internacional Revolución in Spanish). All of the listed Lucha de Apuestas shows have been held in IWRG's home arena Arena Naucalpan in Naucalpan, State of Mexico, Mexico. The main event of these shows is a Lucha de Apuestas or "bet match" where wrestlers "bet" their mask or hair on outcome of the match and the loser would either have to unmask or be shaved bald afterward in the lucha libre traditions. IWRG has run a series of matches billed as either "Máscara vs. Máscara" (Mask vs. Mask), "Máscara vs. Cabellera" (Mask vs. Hair). or "Cabellera vs. Cabellera" over the years, where the main event has been a Lucha de Apuestas match.

== Shows, dates and main events ==
| Event | Date | City | Venue | Main event | Ref(s) |
|---|---|---|---|---|---|
| Cabellera vs. Cabellera | April 3, 2016 | Naucalpan, State of Mexico | Arena Naucalpan | El Hijo del Diablo defeated Cerebro Negro | |
| Cabellera vs. Cabellera | July 17, 2016 | Naucalpan, State of Mexico | Arena Naucalpan | Mr. Electro defeated Máscara Año 2000 Jr. | |
| Máscara vs. Máscara | August 3, 2016 | Naucalpan, State of Mexico | Arena Naucalpan | Dragón Fly defeated Demonio Infernal | |
| Máscara vs. Cabellera | August 7, 2016 | Naucalpan, State of Mexico | Arena Naucalpan | Canis Lupus defeated Máscara Año 2000 Jr. | |
| Cabellera vs. Cabellera | August 17, 2016 | Naucalpan, State of Mexico | Arena Naucalpan | Black Terry defeated Judas El Traidor | |
| Máscara vs. Máscara | September 4, 2016 | Naucalpan, State of Mexico | Arena Naucalpan | Trauma I defeated Canis Lupus | |
| Máscara vs. Cabellera | February 12, 2017 | Naucalpan, State of Mexico | Arena Naucalpan | Golden Magic defeated Pirata Morgan Jr. | |
| 3 Cabelleras vs. 3 Cabelleras | June 25, 2017 | Naucalpan, State of Mexico | Arena Naucalpan | Los Piratas (Pirata Morgan and El Hijo de Pirata Morgan) and Black Warrior defeated Los Oficiales (Oficial 911, Oficial AK-47 and Oficial Fierro) | |
| Máscara vs. Máscara | August 13, 2017 | Naucalpan, State of Mexico | Arena Naucalpan | Black Dragón defeated Gallo Frances | |
| Cabellera vs. Cabellera | September 3, 2017 | Naucalpan, State of Mexico | Arena Naucalpan | Eterno defeated Bombero Infernal | |
| Cabellera vs. Cabellera | February 11, 2018 | Naucalpan, State of Mexico | Arena Naucalpan | Black Dragón defeated Oficial Spartan by disqualification | |
| Cabellera vs. Cabellera | March 25, 2018 | Naucalpan, State of Mexico | Arena Naucalpan | Ricky Marvin defeated Dr. Cerebro | |
| Cabellera vs. Cabellera | June 3, 2018 | Naucalpan, State of Mexico | Arena Naucalpan | Black Dragón defeated Lunatik Xtreme | |
| Cabellera vs. Cabellera | July 15, 2018 | Naucalpan, State of Mexico | Arena Naucalpan | Obett defeated X-Fly | |
| Máscara vs. Cabellera | March 3, 2019 | Naucalpan, State of Mexico | Arena Naucalpan | Dragón Bane defeated Oficial AK-47, also in the match Death Metal and Cerebro Negro | |
