= IWRG Cabellera vs. Cabellera (August 2016) =

2016 International Wrestling Revolution Group event

- Official poster for the event
- Promotion: International Wrestling Revolution Group
- Date: August 17, 2016
- City: Naucalpan, State of Mexico
- Venue: Arena Naucalpan

Event chronology
← Previous; Máscara vs. Cabellera	Next → Máscara vs. Máscara

IWRG Lucha de Apuestas chronology
← Previous; August 2016	Next → September 2016

The IWRG Cabellera vs. Cabellera (August 2016) show (Spanish for "hair versus hair") was a professional wrestling supercard event produced by Mexican professional wrestling promotion International Wrestling Revolution Group (IWRG), and took place on August 17, 2016 in Arena Naucalpan, Naucalpan, State of Mexico, Mexico. The focal point of the Caballera vs. Caballera series of shows is one or more traditional Lucha de Apuestas, or "Bet matches", where all competitors in the match risk their hair on the outcome of the match. The Lucha de Apuestas is considered the most prestigious match type in lucha libre, especially when a wrestlers mask is on the line, but the "hair vs. hair" stipulation is held in almost as high regard.

For the August 2016 Caballera vs. Caballera event IWRG main stay Black Terry and independent circuit wrestler Judas el Traidor both "bet" their hair on the outcome of the match. Black Terry won the match, two falls to one. forcing Judas el Traidor to have all his hair shaved off in the middle of the ring. In the semi-main event Dragón Fly defeated Hip Hop Man and then challenged him to defend the Catch Argentino International Championship at a later date. The show included three additional matches.

== Production ==
=== Background ===
In Lucha libre the wrestling mask holds a sacred place, with the most anticipated and prestigious matches being those where a wrestler's mask is on the line, a so-called Lucha de Apuestas, or "bet match" where the loser would be forced to unmask in the middle of the ring and state their birth name. Winning a mask is considered a bigger accomplishment in lucha libre than winning a professional wrestling championship and usually draws more people and press coverage. Losing a mask is often a watershed moment in a wrestler's career, they give up the mystique and prestige of being an enmascarado (masked wrestler) but usually come with a higher than usual payment from the promoter. By the same token a wrestler betting his hair in a Lucha de Apuestas is seen as highly prestigious, usually a step below the mask match.

=== Storylines ===
The event featured five professional wrestling matches with different wrestlers involved in pre-existing scripted feuds, plots and storylines. Wrestlers were portrayed as either heels (referred to as rudos in Mexico, those that portray the "bad guys") or faces (técnicos in Mexico, the "good guy" characters) as they followed a series of tension-building events, which culminated in a wrestling match or series of matches.

== Event ==
In the opening match the team of Brazo De Oro Jr. and Fly Tiger defeated Shadow Boy and Último Caballero in a best two-out-of-three falls tag team match. In the second match Los Japones del Mal ("The Evil Japanese"; Dowki, Hanaoka, and Yakuza) defeated IWRG tecncos Adrenalina, Alas de Acero, and Aramís. In the third match wrestling veteran Bombero Infernal teamed up with his son Demonio Infernal, and Violencia Jr. to defeat the trio of Black Dragón, Emperador Azteca, and El Hijo del Alebrije.

In the fourth match, rising IWRG tecnico Dragón Fly defeated Hip Hop Man and afterward challenged Hip Hop Man to a match for the Argentina Cruiserweight Championship, a challenge that was not immediately answered. For the main event Judas el Traidor gained the first fall when he used the ropes for illegal leverage to pin Black Terry. In the second fall, Black Terry gained a small measure of revenge as he also used the ropes to pin Judas. The third fall was the longest of the match, ending with Black Terry forcing Judas el Traido to submit for the third and deciding fall. Afterwards, Judas el Traidor was forced to have all his hair shaved off per lucha libre traditions.

== Aftermath ==
Dragón Fly defeated Hip Hop Man to win the Argentina championship on August 248, 2016.

== Results ==
No.	Results	Stipulations
1	Brazo De Oro Jr. and Fly Tiger defeated Shadow Boy and Último Caballero	Best two-out-of-three falls tag team match
2	Los Japones del Mal (Dowki, Hanaoka, and Yakuza) defeated Adrenalina, Alas de Acero, and Aramís	Best two-out-of-three falls six-man "Lucha Libre rules" tag team match
3	Bombero Infernal, Demonio Infernal, and Violencia Jr. defeated Black Dragón, Emperador Azteca, and El Hijo del Alebrije	Best two-out-of-three falls six-man "Lucha Libre rules" tag team match
4	Dragón Fly defeated Hip Hop Man	Singles match
5	Black Terry defeated Judas el Traidor	Best two-out-of-three falls Lucha de Apuestas, hair vs. hair match
