= IWRG Máscara vs. Máscara (August 2016) =

2016 International Wrestling Revolution Group event

- Promotion: International Wrestling Revolution Group
- Date: August 3, 2016 (aired August 7, 2016)
- City: Naucalpan, State of Mexico, Mexico
- Venue: Arena Naucalpan

Event chronology
← Previous; Relevos de Fieras	Next → Máscara vs. Cabellera

IWRG Lucha de Apuestas chronology
← Previous; July 2016	Next → August 2016

IWRG Máscara vs. Máscara (August 2016) was a major professional wrestling event that was scripted and produced by the lucha libre wrestling company International Wrestling Revolution Group (IWRG; sometimes also referred to as Grupo Internacional Revolución in Spanish) that took place on August 3, 2016, in IWRG's home arena Arena Naucalpan in Naucalpan, State of Mexico, Mexico.

In the main event of the show, a Lucha de Apuestas or "bet match", Dragon Fly defeated Demonio Infernal, forcing him to unmask and reveal his real name, José Antonio Rojas. In the semi-final match Black Terry and Judas el Traidor furthered their own storyline feud as Judas el Traidor defeated Black Terry, leading to IWRG's Cabellera vs. Cabellera show two weeks later. The show featured three additional matches.

== Production ==
=== Background ===
In Lucha libre the wrestling mask holds a sacred place, with the most anticipated and prestigious matches being those where a wrestler's mask is on the line, a so-called Lucha de Apuestas, or "bet match" where the loser would be forced to unmask in the middle of the ring and state their birth name. Winning a mask is considered a bigger accomplishment in lucha libre than winning a professional wrestling championship and usually draws more people and press coverage. Losing a mask is often a watershed moment in a wrestler's career, they give up the mystique and prestige of being an enmascarado (masked wrestler) but usually come with a higher than usual payment from the promoter.

=== Storylines ===
IWRG's August 2016 Máscara vs. Máscara show featured five professional wrestling matches with different wrestlers involved in pre-existing scripted feuds, plots and storylines. Wrestlers portrayed either heels (referred to as rudos in Mexico, those that portray the "bad guys") or faces (técnicos in Mexico, the "good guy" characters) as they followed a series of tension-building events, which culminated in a wrestling match or series of matches.

== Event ==
In the opening match the Keiser Dragón teamed up with Brazo de Oro Jr. (Note: This is the most recent wrestler to use the name "Brazo de Oro Jr.", the first wrestler to use the name was Felipe Alvarado, better known as La Máscara.) and faced off against the rudo team of Fly Tiger and Último Caballero. Keiser Dragón and Brazo de Oro Jr. won the match, two falls to one. Prior to the second match TV cameras revealed that Consejo Mundial de Lucha Libre (CMLL) wrestlers Raijin and Fuiji were in the audience, holding up signs to show support for their fellow Japanese wrestler Hanaoka who was competing in the match. Hanaoka faced off against Araña de Plata ("Silver Spider"), Alas de Acero ("Wings of Steel"), Guerrero 2000 ("Warrior 2000") and Aramis in a Five-way match, where all five wrestlers were allowed in the ring and whoever got the fall would win the match. In the end Araña de Plata won the match. The match that was later described as a "really good match" by The Gladiatores magazine. The third match of the night was the only Best two-out-of-three-falls six-man tag team match, the most common match form in Mexico, of the night. The rudo trio of Dowki, Picudo Jr. and Skanda defeated the técnico team Black Dragón, El Hijo del Alebrije and Yakuza.

During the semi-main event match between Black Terry and Judas el Traidor, both wrestlers used various weapons to attack their opponents. One of these weapons was a steel chain that Judas used to hit Black Terry with, drawing blood from Terry's forehead. Moments later both wrestlers retrieved steel folding chairs from ringside to use during the match. Moments later the referee was knocked down by Black Terry, which allowed Judas el Traidor to hit Black Terry with the chair without getting disqualified. Moments later Judas pinned Black Terry as a second referee came to the ring to count the fall. Judas continued to attack Black Terry after the bell rang, hitting him several times with the steel chair until several students from IWRG's Futuro Idolos de Lucha Libre ("Future Idols of Wrestling"; FILL) wrestling school came to the ring to save their trainer, Black Terry, from further attacks. After the match several of the FILL students challenged Judas el Traidor, but in the end Black Terry demanded that Judas put his hair on the line in a Lucha de Apuestas match.

For the main event the rudo Demonio Infernal came to the ring alone, without the traditional cornerman most Lucha de Apuestas matches have. During Dragon Fly's entrance he was attacked by Bombero Infernal, a veteran IWRG rudo, who struck Dragon Fly from the back and then beat him up on the floor. Bombero Infernal remained in the arena as Demonio Infernal's second while Aramis came to ringside to lend support for Dragon Fly throughout the match. Dragon Fly's mask was torn and he was bleeding from his forehead even before the opening bell rang. With the sneak attack from Bombero Infernal Dragon Fly was pinned only minutes into the first fall, putting the técnico a fall behind very quickly. During the second fall Bombero Infernal attacked Dragon Fly again, making sure not to be seen by the referee, but the attack backfired and Dragon Fly was able to win the second fall. Between the falls Bombero Infernal and Aramis started fighting, leading the referee to eject both wrestlers from the arena. The third and decisive fall was the longest of the match, with Demonio Infernal controlling much of the match, until Dragon Fly was able to execute a move off the top rope, leading to the winning pinfall for the técnico Dragon Fly. After the loss Demonio Infernal removed his mask and, per lucha libre traditions, revealed that his name was Antonio Rojas, that he was 21 years old and from Mexico City.

== Aftermath ==
Three weeks after his mask win, on August 24, Dragon Fly defeated Hip Hop Man to win the AIWA Argentiniean National Cruiserweight Championship on an IWRG show, his first championship win in IWRG. After the semi-main event match between Black Terry and Judas El Traidor was the main event of the IWRG show one week after Máscara vs. Máscara. That match ended in a draw and another challenge for a Lucha de Apuestas between the two was made. The two finally agreed to put their hair on the line, which led to the Cabellera vs. Cabellera show two weeks later, where Black Terry defeated Judas El Traidor, forcing Judas to have all his hair shaved off.

== Results ==
No.	Results	Stipulations
1^{D}	Brazo de Oro Jr. and Keiser Dragón defeated Fly Tiger and Último Caballero	Tag team match
2	Araña de Plata defeated Alas de Acero, Guerrero 2000, Aramis and Hanaoka	Five-way match
3	Dowki, Picudo Jr. and Skanda defeated Black Dragón, El Hijo del Alebrije and Yakuza	Best two-out-of-three-falls six-man tag team match
4	Judas el Traidor defeated Black Terry	Singles match
5	Dragon Fly defeated Demonio Infernal	Best two-out-of-three falls Lucha de Apuestas, mask vs. mask match
D / – this was a dark match
