= IWRG Máscara vs. Máscara (September 2016) =

2016 International Wrestling Revolution Group event

- Official poster of the event
- Promotion: International Wrestling Revolution Group
- Date: September 4, 2016 (aired September 5, 2016)
- City: Naucalpan, State of Mexico, Mexico
- Venue: Arena Naucalpan
- Tagline(s): Llego la Hora de la Verdad (It is time for the truth)

Event chronology
← Previous; Cabellera vs. Cabellera	Next → TBA

IWRG Lucha de Apuestas chronology
← Previous; August 2016	Next → February 2017

The IWRG Máscara vs. Máscara (September 2016) (Spanish for "Mask versus Mask") was a major professional wrestling event that was scripted and produced by the lucha libre wrestling company International Wrestling Revolution Group (IWRG; sometimes also referred to as Grupo Internacional Revolución in Spanish) that took place on September 4, 2016, in IWRG's home arena Arena Naucalpan in Naucalpan, State of Mexico, Mexico. The main event and highlights from several of the matches on the show were broadcast the following day on AYM Sports in Mexico and matches from the show were later posted online by the Lucha+ TV show.

In the main event of the show, a Lucha de Apuestas or "bet match", Trauma I defeated Canis Lupus, forcing him to unmask and reveal his real name, Héctor López. Also on the show Imposible defeated Heddi Karaoui to win the IWRG Intercontinental Middleweight Championship and the team of Veneno and Chicano became the number one contenders for the IWRG Intercontinental Tag Team Championship.

== Production ==
=== Background ===
In Lucha libre the wrestling mask holds a sacred place, with the most anticipated and prestigious matches being those where a wrestler's mask is on the line, a so-called Lucha de Apuestas, or "bet match" where the loser would be forced to unmask in the middle of the ring and state their birth name. Winning a mask is considered a bigger accomplishment in lucha libre than winning a professional wrestling championship.

The Máscara vs. Máscara show was the third of three major shows held within a week of each other, produced by the three biggest lucha libre promotions in Mexico, AAA, Consejo Mundial de Lucha Libre (CMLL) and IWRG. The first show, AAA's Triplemanía XXIV, which took on Sunday August 28 at the Arena Ciudad de México with Psycho Clown defeating Pagano in a Lucha de Apuestas match in the main event. The second major lucha libre show, the CMLL 83rd Anniversary Show, took place five days after Triplemanía on September 2 at Arena México where Dragon Lee defeated La Máscara in a match where both their masks were on the line. Finally IWRG held the Máscara vs. Máscara show two days later on September 4.

=== Storylines ===
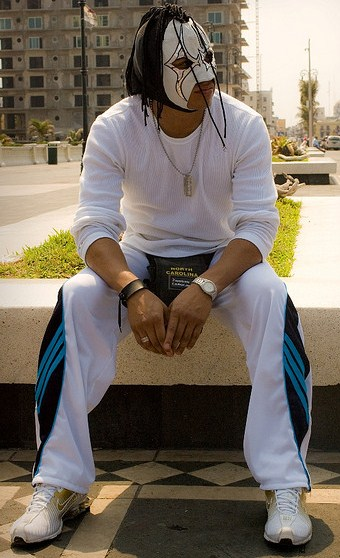
Trauma I, one of the wrestlers risking his mask in the main event

The event featured six professional wrestling matches with different wrestlers involved in pre-existing scripted feuds, plots and storylines. Wrestlers were portrayed as either heels (referred to as rudos in Mexico, those that portray the "bad guys") or faces (técnicos in Mexico, the "good guy" characters) as they performed in matches with a pre-determined outcome.

In early 2016 Trauma I defeated El Hijo de Dos Caras to win the IWRG Intercontinental Heavyweight Championship in the main event of IWRG's 2016 Triangular de la Muerte ("Triangle of Death") show. Subsequently, Trauma I and his brother Trauma II became involved in a storyline feud with Los Insoportables ("The Unbearables") team of Canis Lupus and Eterno). This led to Los Traumas defeating Los Insportables in the main event of IWRG's Choque de Rudos ("Villain Shock"). A few weeks later Los Insportables gained a measure of revenge by defeating Los Traumas. On April 13 Los Traumas and their father Negro Navarro successfully defended the IWRG Intercontinental Trios Championship against Canis Lupus, Eterno and Apolo Estrada Jr. Throughout the storyline the focal point was on the issues between Trauma I and Canis Lupus, which lead to Canis Lupus defeating Trauma I in the main event of the Lucha de Fieras ("Fierce Fight"). On April 24 Canis Lupus played a key role in Máscara Año 2000 Jr. defeating Trauma I to win the IWRG Intercontinental Heavyweight Championship, attacking Trauma I when the referee was not looking. After the match Canis Lupus demanded a title match as he helped Máscara Año 2000 Jr. win the championship. The following week the two faced off in a match where both wrestlers would bleed heavily during the match. Following Máscara Año 2000 Jr. cheating to retain the championship Trauma I came to the ring, challenging both wrestlers to a Lucha de Apuestas match.

In June Mr. Electro began working for IWRG on a regular basis and ends up winning the IWRG Intercontinental Heavyweight Championship on June 12. From that point on the storyline turned into a four-way feud between Trauma I, Canis Lupus, Máscara Año 2000 Jr. and Mr. Electro. On July 10 Mr. Electro defeated Máscara Año 2000 Jr. in the main event of IWRG's Gran Mano a Mano Esperando where Mr. Electro defeated Máscara Año 2000 Jr. after hitting him with a light tube. Following the match both agreed to put their hair on the line in a Lucha de Apuestas match the following week. A week later Mascara Ano 2000 Jr. pinned Mr. Electro, forcing Mr. Electro to have his hair shaved off as a result. Afterwards Canis Lupus challenged Mascara Ano 2000 Jr. to another Lucha de Apuestas match where Canis Lupus would put his mask on the line. The match took place on August 8 and was Canis Lupus pin Mascara Ano 2000 Jr. in the third fall to win the match. While Mascara Ano 2000 Jr. was being shaved bald Trauma I came to ringside and challenged Canis Lupus to put his mask on the line. Canis Lupus agreed with IWRG announcing that both wrestlers would risk their hair in the main event of IWRG's September 4 show. In the week after IWRG made the match official Box y Lucha magazine stated it was "IWRG's biggest Apuestas match in years", noting the high profile of both masked wrestlers involved in the match. On August 25 IWRG released the poster for the Máscara vs. Máscara event, which revealed the six match show details.

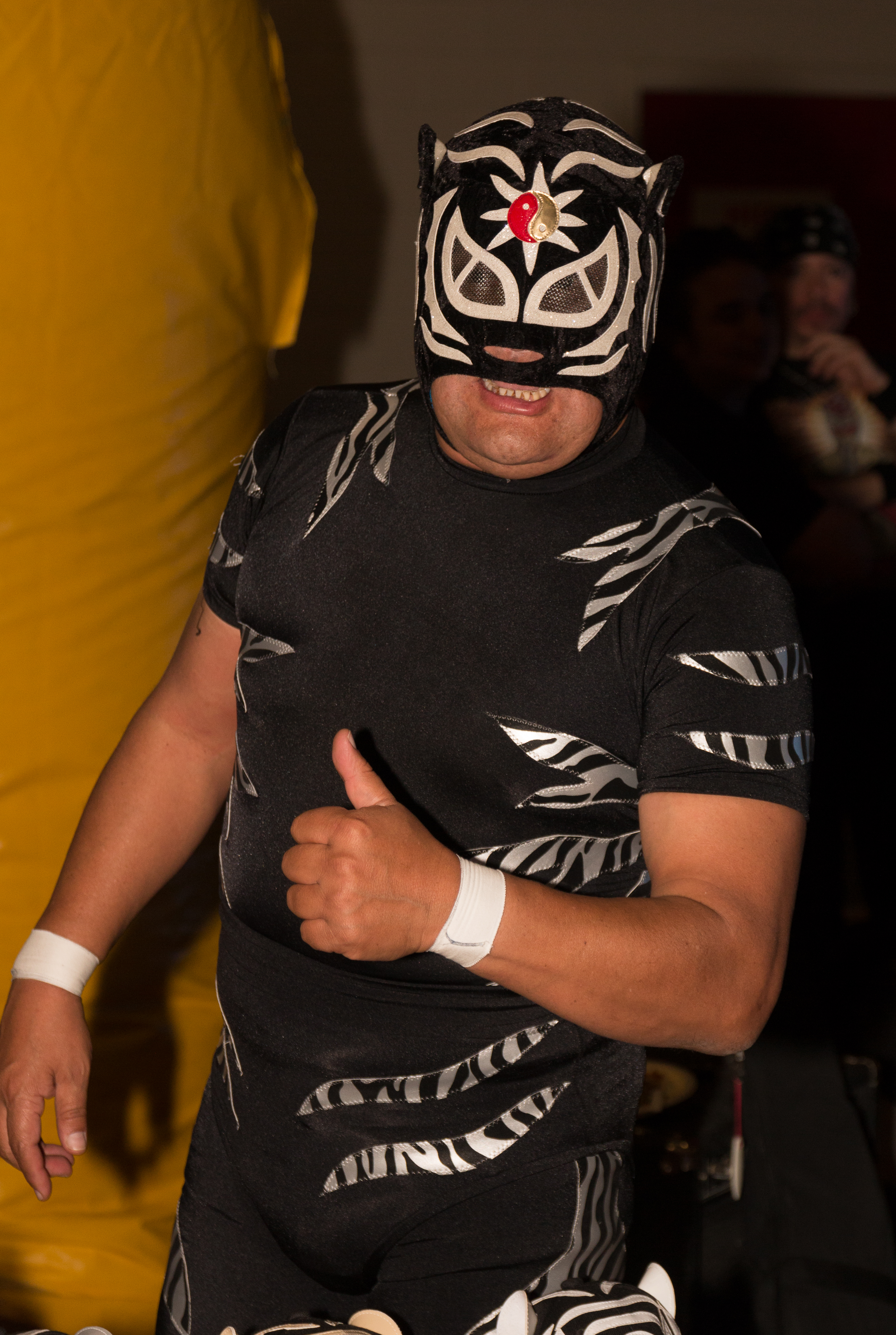
Pantera, one half of the IWRG Intercontinental Tag Team Championship team

The father/son team of Pantera and El Hijo del Pantera won the IWRG Intercontinental Tag Team Championship from Los Gringos VIP (Apolo Estrada Jr. and El Hijo del Diablo on November 22, 2015. The team only defended the championship once between November 2015 and August 2016, defeating the father son team of Negro Navarro and Trauma II on February 7, 2016. To determine the next number one contenders for the tag team championship they booked a four-way tag team match where the winners would be given the next match. None of the four teams in the tournament had team together prior, but were paired up by IWRG. The teams include El Hijo de Dos Caras and Trauma II, Máscara Año 2000 Jr. and Toscano, Mr. Electro and Herodes Jr. and finally Veneno vs. Chicano,

On August 21 then reigning IWRG Intercontinental Lightweight Champion Imposible announced that he was vacating the championship after having held it for 1142 days, starting on July 7, 2013. Imposible decided he wanted to move up to the middleweight class and wanted to challenge for the IWRG Intercontinental Middleweight Championship. IWRG agreed and gave him a championship match against reigning champion Heddi Karaoui at Máscara vs. Máscara. The match will be Karaoui's second championship defense since winning the championship on October 25, 2015.

IWRG announced three additional matches without any ongoing storylines leading into the matches but featuring several IWRG regulars including Distrito Federal Trios Champions Los Tortuga Ninja (a Teenage Mutant Ninja Turtle inspired group of masked wrestlers; Leo, Mikey and Rafy teaming with fourth Tortuga Leelo) to face off against Hananoka, Hip Hop Man, Killer Jr. and Yakuza in the third match of the night. In the second match of the night long time IWRG wrestlers Black Terry and Cerebro Negro (part of Los Terrible Cerebros) team up with Pantera I to take on two-thirds of Los Mariachis Locos, El Hijo del Diablo and Diablo Jr., who team up with Violencia Jr.

The opening match saw rivals Dragon Fly and Demonio Infernal on opposite sides of an eight-man tag team match where Dragon Fly teams up with Alas de Oro, Aramis and Diosa Atena, while Demoio Infernal teams up with Araña de Plata, Skanda and Lili Darth. On August 3, in the main event of IWRG's most recent Máscara vs. Cabellera show, Dragon Fly defeated Demonio Infernal in a Lucha de Apuestas, forcing Demonio Infiernal to unmask afterwards.

== Event ==
Alas de Acero was originally advertised for the opening event, but he was replaced by Cadillac on the night of the event, with no official explanation given. The team of Araña de Plata, Demonio Infernal, Lilith Dark and Skanda defeated Aramis, Cadillac, Diosa Atenea and Dragón Fly, two falls to one. The focal point of the second match of the night was the ongoing, escalating feud between El Hijo del Diablo and Black Terry. The match saw Hijo del Diablo, Diablo Jr. and Violencia Jr. defeat Black Terry, Cerebro Negro and Pantera I by underhanded means. After the match both Hijo del Diablo and Black Terry made challenges for a Lucha de Apuestas, hair vs. hair match, that was then made official for September 18. In the third match of the night IWRG regulars Los Tortugas Ninja defeated Hip Hop Man and the "Outsiders" Hanaoka, Hip Hop Man, Killer Jr., Yakuza.

For the IWRG Intercontinental Middleweight Championship match Imposible was accompanied by his Los Mariachis de la Muerte team member El Hijo del Diablo. During the match defending champion Karaoui hit his head and was bleeding throughout the closing portions of the match. In the end Imposible pinned Karaoui to become the 36th IWRG Intercontinental Middleweight Champion. The semi-main event tag team math was contested first fall wins the match rules, which led to all teams fighting to stay alive, breaking up pinfalls throughout the match. In the end Veneno pinned El Hijo del Dos Casas to win the match and thus earned a title opportunity for himself and Chicano.

For the Lucha de Apuestas match Trauma I had Mr. Elektro in his corner while Canis Lupus was accompanied by Máscara Año 2000 Jr. While both wrestlers lent moral support, neither of the corner-men interfered during the match. Canis Lupus won the first fall, putting Trauma I at a disadvantage. Trauma I won the second fall with a submission, leading to the third fall. Canis Lupus was bleeding by the beginning of the third fall, which escalated throughout the match, leaving bloodstains all over the canvas as the match progressed. During the third and deciding fall of the main event Trauma I accidentally hit the referee, which gave Canis Lupus the opportunity to use a Piledriver on Trauma I. In lucha libre the piledriver is a banned moved and is always played up as being very damaging to the neck of the recipient. The move was not enough to finish the match as Trauma I managed to lift his shoulder at the last seconds. The match was momentarily stopped for a doctor to check on Trauma I, but to the surprise of everyone in the arena Trauma I insisted on fighting, ending up trapping Canis Lupus in a figure-four leglock, forcing Canis Lupus to submit. After the match, Trauma I was fitted with a neck brace to sell the damage from the pile driver. As a result of his loss Canis Lupus had to unmask and reveal his real name, Héctor López, that he was 32 years old and had been a wrestler for 10 years. López brought his girlfriend into the ring to do the actual unmasking, after which he proposed to her, which she accepted.

== Aftermath ==
The main event and highlights from several of the matches on the show were broadcast the following day on AYM Sports in Mexico. Some of matches from the show were later posted online by the Lucha+ TV show as well. After being named the number one contenders for the IWRG Intercontinental Tag Team Championship Chicano and Veneno were given a match for the championship the following week on September 11. During the match the actual lights in Arena Naucalpan went out, promoting the fans in attendance to take out their cell phones and lighting up the arena as Chicano and Veneno defeated El Pantera and El Hijo del Pantera to win the championship. While both Black Terry and El Hijo del Diablo agreed to a Lucha de Apuestas match for September 18, IWRG did not actually announce that match as part of their September 18th show.

== Results ==
No.	Results	Stipulations
1	Araña de Plata, Skanda, Demonio Infernal and Lili Darth defeated Aramis, Cadillac, Dragon Fly and Diosa Atena	Best two-out-of-three-falls eight-man tag team match
2	Violencia Jr. and Los Mariachis Locos (Diablo Jr. and El Hijo del Diablo) defeated Pantera I and Los Cerebros Terrible (Black Terry and Cerebro Negro)	Best two-out-of-three-falls six-man tag team match
3	Los Tortugas Ninjas (Leo, Mikey, Leelo and Rafy) defeated Hanaoka, Hip Hop Man, Killer Jr. and Yakuza	Best two-out-of-three-falls eight-man tag team match
4	Imposible defeated Heddi Karaoui (c)	Singles match for the IWRG Intercontinental Middleweight Championship
5	Veneno and Chicano defeated El Hijo de Dos Caras and Trauma II, Máscara Año 2000 Jr. and Toscano, Mr. Electro and Herodes Jr.	Four way tag team match, number one contender for the IWRG Intercontinental Tag Team Championship
6	Trauma I defeated Canis Lupus	Best two-out-of-three falls Lucha de Apuestas, mask vs. mask match
(c) / – the champion(s) heading into the match
