= IWRG Relevos Increibles de Máscaras y Cabelleras =

2018 International Wrestling Revolution Group event

IWRG Relevos Increíbles de Máscaras y Cabelleras
- Official poster for the show, depicting all four main event competitors
- Date: October 7, 2018
- City: Naucalpan, State of Mexico
- Venue: Arena Naucalpan

Event chronology
← Previous; Caravana de Campeones	Next → El Castillo del Terror

The IWRG Relevos Increíbles de Máscaras y Cabelleras (Spanish for "Incredible relays for Masks and Hair") show is a major lucha libre event produced and scripted by Mexican professional wrestling promotion International Wrestling Revolution Group (IWRG), that took place on October 7, 2018 in Arena Naucalpan, Naucalpan, State of Mexico, Mexico. The focal point of the event was a Relevos increíbles tag team match between the teams of Aramís/Dragón Bane and Demonio Infernal/Freelance. The first two wrestlers pinned in the tag team match would then face off against each other in a traditional Lucha de Apuestas ("bet match"), risking either their wrestling mask or their hair on the outcome of the match. The show ended with Demonio Infernal pinning Freelance, forcing Freelance to have all his hair shaved off afterward. The Relevos Increíbles de Máscaras y Cabelleras show featured six additional matches.

== Production ==
=== Background ===
In Lucha libre the wrestling mask holds a sacred place, with the most anticipated and prestigious matches being those where a wrestler's mask is on the line, a so-called Lucha de Apuestas, or "bet match" where the loser would be forced to unmask in the middle of the ring and state their birth name. Winning a mask is considered a bigger accomplishment in lucha libre than winning a professional wrestling championship and usually draws more people and press coverage. Losing a mask is often a watershed moment in a wrestler's career, they give up the mystique and prestige of being an enmascarado (masked wrestler) but usually come with a higher than usual payment from the promoter. By the same token a wrestler betting his hair in a Lucha de Apuestas is seen as highly prestigious, usually a step below the mask match.

=== Storylines ===
The event featured eight professional wrestling matches with different wrestlers involved in pre-existing scripted feuds, plots and storylines. Wrestlers were portrayed as either heels (referred to as rudos in Mexico, those that portray the "bad guys") or faces (técnicos in Mexico, the "good guy" characters) as they followed a series of tension-building events, which culminated in a wrestling match or series of matches.

== Event ==
The "surprise wrestler" in the fourth match of the night turned out to be Súper Nova, who returned to his "Súper Nova" ring character after having worked under the name "Bengala" for Lucha Libre AAA Worldwide (AAA) since 2016. His match ended in a disqualification when Herodes Jr. and El Hijo de Sangre Chicana to attack the tecnico team of Súper Nova, Imposible and Toscano, causing a disqualification. Afterward, the two, and El Hijo de Pirata Morgan declared that they collectively would be known as "Los Masters Juniors.

The masked team of Aramís and Dragón Bane faced off against the unmasked team of Demonio Infernal and Freelance in the first stage of the Relevos increíbles featured match. Aramis and Dragón Bane almost lost the match due to their ongoing storyline feud, but in the end won the match, which in turn forced Demonio Infernal and Freelance to face off in the last match of the night. In the end, Demonio Infernal pinned Freelance to win the match. After the match Freelance stood in the middle of the ring as his hair was shaved completely off.

== Results ==
No.	Results	Stipulations
1	Chef Benito and Death Metal defeated Latino and Toto	Best two-out-of-three-falls tag team match
2	Diablo Jr. defeated Black Shadow II	Best two-out-of-three falls match
3	Capo del Norte, Capo del Sur and Séptimo Rayo defeated Metaleón, Multifacetico 2.0 and Rokambole Jr.	Best two-out-of-three falls six-man "Lucha Libre rules" tag team match
4	El Hijo del Alebrije defeated El Hijo de Canis Lupus	Best two-out-of-three-falls match
5	Súper Nova, Imposible and Toscano defeated El Hijo de Pirata Morgan, Pitbull and Último Gladiador by disqualification	Best two-out-of-three falls six-man "Lucha Libre rules" tag team match
6	Los Tortugas Ninjas (Leo and Rafy) defeated Los Tortuga Negra (Ra-Zhata and Shil-Ka)	Best two-out-of-three-falls tag team match
7	Aramís and Dragón Bane defeated Demonio Infernal and Freelance	"Losers advance" Relevos increíbles tag team match
8	Demonio Infernal defeated Freelance	Lucha de Apuestas, hair vs. hair match
