= IWRG Cabellera vs. Cabellera (April 2016) =

2016 International Wrestling Revolution Group event

- Official poster for the event
- Promotion: International Wrestling Revolution Group
- Date: April 3, 2016 (aired April 4, 2016 (AYM Sports))
- City: Naucalpan, State of Mexico
- Venue: Arena Naucalpan

Event chronology
← Previous; Rebelión de los Juniors	Next → Guerra del Golfo

IWRG Lucha de Apuestas chronology
← Previous; First	Next → July 2016

The IWRG Cabellera vs. Cabellera (April 2016) show (Spanish for "hair versus hair") was a professional wrestling supercard event produced by Mexican professional wrestling promotion International Wrestling Revolution Group (IWRG), and took place on April 3, 2016, in Arena Naucalpan, Naucalpan, State of Mexico, Mexico. The focal point of the Caballera vs. Caballera series of shows is one or more traditional Lucha de Apuestas, or "Bet matches", where all competitors in the match risk their hair on the outcome of the match. The Lucha de Apuestas is considered the most prestigious match type in lucha libre, especially when a wrestlers mask is on the line, but the "hair vs. hair" stipulation is held in almost as high regard.

For the April 2016 Caballera vs. Caballera event El Hijo del Diablo and Cerebro Negro both "bet" their hair on the match as part of a long-running storyline feud between the Los Terribles Cerebros ("The Terrible Brains"; which also includes Black Terry and Cerebro Negro) and El Hijo del Diablo's faction Los Mariachis Locos ("The Crazy Mariachis"; Imposible and Diablo Jr.). El Hijo del Diablo won the match when Black Terry was disqualified due to outside interference, and thus had all his hair shaved off. In the semi-main event Máscara Año 2000 Jr. defeated Trauma I as IWRG was building to a future match for the IWRG Intercontinental Heavyweight Championship. The show featured four additional matches.

== Production ==
=== Background ===
In Lucha libre the wrestling mask holds a sacred place, with the most anticipated and prestigious matches being those where a wrestler's mask is on the line, a so-called Lucha de Apuestas, or "bet match" where the loser would be forced to unmask in the middle of the ring and state their birth name. Winning a mask is considered a bigger accomplishment in lucha libre than winning a professional wrestling championship and usually draws more people and press coverage. Losing a mask is often a watershed moment in a wrestler's career, they give up the mystique and prestige of being an enmascarado (masked wrestler) but usually come with a higher than usual payment from the promoter.

=== Storylines ===
The event featured six professional wrestling matches with different wrestlers involved in pre-existing scripted feuds, plots and storylines. Wrestlers were portrayed as either heels (referred to as rudos in Mexico, those that portray the "bad guys") or faces (técnicos in Mexico, the "good guy" characters) as they followed a series of tension-building events, which culminated in a wrestling match or series of matches.

== Event ==
The show started with a best two-out-of-three falls tag team match with the tecnico team of Black Dragón and Dragón Fly defeating Matrix Jr. and Ram El Carnero, two falls to one. The second match of the night saw the trio known as Las Tortugas Ninja ("The Ninja Turtle"; Leo, Mike and Rafy) face off against the rudo trio Los Comandos Elite (Factor, Rayan and Spector). Los Tortugas won the match in two straight falls, followed by Los Oficiales attacking Los Tortugas to try to steal their masks. Once the two sides were separated by officials Los Tortugas challenged Los Oficiales to a Lucha de Apuestas match for their masks, Apolo Estrada Jr. was originally scheduled to be part of the third match, but for unexplained reasons was replaced by El Golpeador when it was match time. Golpeador, Eterno and Canis Lupus lost to the team of Picudo Jr. and Los Terribles Cerebros ("The Terrible Brains"; Black Terry and Dr. Cerebro).

In the fourth match Golden Magic teamed up with La Dinastia de la Muerte ("The Dynasty of Death"; Negro Navarro and Trauma II, facing off against the rudo team of Danny Casas, El Diablo Jr. and Veneno. During the first fall Casas got his team disqualified by committing a foul that the referee saw. In the second fall Golden Magic pinned Casas while putting his feet on the rope for extra leverage to get the two to zero victory. For the fifth a match of the night Máscara Año 2000 Jr. defeated Trauma I, as part of their long-running storyline feud between the two, Mr. Electro and Canis Lupus.

For the last match El Hijo del Diablo was accompanied to the ring by his son, Diablo Jr., while Cerebro Negro was accompanied by Dr. Cerebro for the match. The two split the first two falls between them, leading to a long last fall. At one put the referee was knocked down, which allowed Dr. Cerebro to foul El Hijo del Diablo, leading to Cerebro Negro covering him. Since the original referee was knocked out, a second referee came to the ring, but El Hijo del Diablo kicked out. After a few more minutes of action, Cerebro Negro pinned El Hijo del Diablo, to seemingly win the match. Moments later the original referee recovered and called for Cerebro Negro to be disqualified. After the match Cerebro Negro sat in the middle of the ring and had all his hair shaved off.

== Results ==
No.	Results	Stipulations
1^{D}	Black Dragón and Dragón Fly defeated Matrix Jr. and Ram El Carnero	Best two-out-of-three falls tag team match
2^{D}	Los Tortugas Ninja (Leo, Mike, and Rafy) defeated Los Comandos Elite (Oficial Factor, Oficial Rayan, and Oficial Spector)	Best two-out-of-three falls six-man "Lucha Libre rules" tag team match
3^{D}	Black Terry, Dr. Cerebro, and Picudo Jr. defeated Canis Lupus, Eterno, and Golpeador	Best two-out-of-three falls six-man "Lucha Libre rules" tag team match
4^{D}	Golden Magic, Negro Navarro, and Trauma II defeated Danny Casas, El Diablo Jr., and Veneno	Best two-out-of-three falls six-man "Lucha Libre rules" tag team match
5^{D}	Máscara Año 2000 Jr. defeated Trauma I	Singles match
6	El Hijo del Diablo defeated Cerebro Negro by disqualification	Best two-out-of-three falls Lucha de Apuestas, hair vs. hair match
D / – this was a dark match
