= IWRG Máscara vs. Cabellera (August 2016) =

2016 International Wrestling Revolution Group event

- Official poster for the event
- Promotion: International Wrestling Revolution Group
- Date: August 7, 2016 (aired August 9, 2016 (AYM Sports))
- City: Naucalpan, State of Mexico
- Venue: Arena Naucalpan

Event chronology
← Previous; Máscara vs. Máscara	Next → Cabellera vs. Cabellera

IWRG Lucha de Apuestas chronology
← Previous; Máscara vs. Máscara	Next → Cabellera vs. Cabellera

The IWRG Máscara vs. Cabellera (August 2016) show (Spanish for "mask versus hair") was a professional wrestling supercard event produced by Mexican professional wrestling promotion International Wrestling Revolution Group (IWRG), and took place on August 7, 2016 at Arena Naucalpan, Naucalpan, State of Mexico, Mexico. The focal point of the Máscara vs. Caballera series of shows is one or more traditional Lucha de Apuestas, or "Bet matches", in which all competitors in the match risk their hair on the outcome of the match. The Lucha de Apuestas is considered the most prestigious match type in lucha libre, especially when a wrestlers mask is on the line, but the "hair vs. hair" stipulation is held in almost as high regard.

For the August 2016 Máscara vs. Caballera event the masked Canis Lupus put his mask on the line against Máscara Año 2000 Jr.'s hair in the main event. Canis Lupus was helped to victory both by El Hijo de Dos Caras and Trauma I both hitting Máscara Año 2000 Jr. with a steel chair. After the event Máscara Año 2000 Jr. was shaved bald while Trauma I and Canis Lupus both agreed to put their mask on the line at IWRG's next major show, Máscara vs. Máscara. In the semi-main event Trauma I defeated Mr. Electro to win the IWRG Intercontinental Heavyweight Championship. The show included four additional matches.

== Production ==
=== Background ===
In Lucha libre the wrestling mask holds a sacred place, with the most anticipated and prestigious matches being those in which a wrestler's mask is on the line, a so-called Lucha de Apuestas, or "bet match" where the loser is forced to unmask in the middle of the ring and state their birth name. Winning a mask is considered a bigger accomplishment in lucha libre than winning a professional wrestling championship and usually draws more people and press coverage. Losing a mask is often a watershed moment in a wrestler's career, they give up the mystique and prestige of being an enmascarado (masked wrestler) but usually come with a higher-than usual payment from the promoter.

=== Storylines ===
The event featured six professional wrestling matches with different wrestlers involved in pre-existing scripted feuds, plots and storylines. Wrestlers were portrayed as either heels (referred to as rudos in Mexico, those who portray the "bad guys") or faces (técnicos in Mexico, the "good guy" characters) as they followed a series of tension-building events, which culminated in a wrestling match or series of matches.

== Event ==
Demonio Infernal was originally scheduled to wrestle Omega in the opening match of the show, but instead Skanda was moved down from the second match to wrestle and defeat Omega. Instead Demonio Infernal took Skanda's spot in the second match, teaming with Violencia Jr. to defeat Black Dragón and Dragón Fly, two falls to one. The third match was the first best two-out-of-three falls six-man tag team match of the night, the most prevalent match form in Mexico. The trio of Black Terry, Cerebro Negro and Dr. Cerebro, collectively known as Los Cerebros Negros ("The Black Brains") wrestled constant rivals Los Mariachis Locos ("The Crazy Mariachis"; Diablo Jr., El Hijo del Diablo and Imposible. Los Cerebros won the match when one of them hit Diablo Jr. below the belt without being noticed by the referee and then pinned him. For the fourth match El Hijo de Dos Caras teamed up with the father/son team of Negro Navarro and Trauma I to take on Herodes Jr., Relámpago, and Silver King. El Hijo de Dos Caras won the third and deciding fall when he pinned Silver King, although Silver King complained afterward that it was not a three-count and asked for a rematch against El Hijo de Dos Caras.

Both the semi-final and final match of the evening continued an ongoing four-way storyline feud between Trauma I, Mr. Electro, Canis Lupus and Máscara Año 2000 Jr. that had started months earlier. In the semi-final match, Mr. Electro put the IWRG Intercontinental Heavyweight Championship on the line against Trauma I. Canis Lupus came to ringside near the end of the match and fouled Mr. Electro, allowing Trauma I to win the championship. For the final match Máscara Año 2000 Jr. was accompanied to ringside by El Hijo de Dos Caras, while Canis Lupus did not have a corner-man initially. During the match El Hijo de Dos Caras accidentally hit Máscara Año 2000 Jr. with a steel chair, followed by Trauma I running to ringside, hitting Máscara Año 2000 Jr. with a steel chair as well, allowing Canis Lupus to win the match and retain his mask. After Máscara Año 2000 Jr. was shaved bald, both Trauma I and Canis Lupus agreed to put their masks on the line at IWRG's next big show in September, Máscara vs. Máscara.

== Aftermath ==
Trauma I ended up defeating Canis Lupus as the Máscara vs. Máscara show, forcing Canis Lupus to unmask and reveal his real name, Héctor López.

Trauma I's reign as IWRG Intercontinental Heavyweight Champion lasted for 134 days, until August 7, 2017 where he lost the championship to Mr Electro.

== Results ==
No.	Results	Stipulations
1^{D}	Skanda defeated Omega	Singles match
2^{D}	Demonio Infernal and Violencia Jr. defeated Black Dragón and Dragón Fly	Best two-out-of-three falls tag team match
3	Los Cerebros Negros (Black Terry, Cerebro Negro, and Dr. Cerebro) defeated Los Mariachis Locos (El Diablo Jr., El Hijo del Diablo, and Imposible)	Best two-out-of-three falls six-man "Lucha Libre rules" tag team match
4^{D}	El Hijo de Dos Caras, Negro Navarro, and Trauma II defeated Herodes Jr., Relámpago, and Silver King	Best two-out-of-three falls six-man "Lucha Libre rules" tag team match
5	Trauma I defeated Mr. Electro (C)	Singles match for the IWRG Intercontinental Heavyweight Championship
6	Canis Lupus defeated Máscara Año 2000 Jr.	Best two-out-of-three falls Lucha de Apuestas, mask vs. hair match
D / – this was a dark match
