= IWRG Intercontinental Middleweight Championship =

Professional wrestling championship by International Wrestling Revolution Group

- The middleweight championship belt

Details
- Promotion: International Wrestling Revolution Group
- Date established: July 27, 1997
- Current champion: Flamita
- Date won: April 19, 2026
Statistics
- First champion: El Pantera
- Most reigns: Bombero Infernal (7 reigns)
- Longest reign: Pentagón Black (At least 351 days) (Individual); Bombero Infernal (At least 488 days) (Combined)
- Shortest reign: Nitro (6 days) (Confirmed)

The IWRG Intercontinental Middleweight Championship (Campeonato Intercontinental de Peso Medio IWRGL in Spanish) is a professional wrestling championship promoted by the Mexican wrestling promotion International Wrestling Revolution Group (IWRG). The official definition of the Middleweight weight class in Mexico is between 82 kg (181 lb) and 87 kg (192 lb), but the weight limits are not always strictly adhered to. (Note: One example the weightlimits not being strictly enforced is Mephisto winning the CMLL World Welterweight Championship, a championship with a 78 kg (172 lb) upper limit despite weighing 90 kg (200 lb).) Because Lucha Libre puts more emphasis on the lower weightclasses, this division is considered more important than the normally more prestigious heavyweight division of the promotion.

The current champion is Flamita who defeated then-champion Toxin for the title on April 19, 2026. Flamita is the 51st overall champion. The first champion was Pantera, who defeated Tony Rivera in Naucalpan, Mexico on July 27, 1997 in the finals of a tournament. It has since been defended throughout Mexico, but primarily in Naucalpan which is the IWRG's "home ground". In November 2007 Negro Casas, who was under contract with Consejo Mundial de Lucha Libre (CMLL) but worked for IWRG under a talent sharing agreement between IWRG and CMLL, won the title. The talent sharing agreement ended in 2008 but the Middleweight championship was not declared vacant even though Negro Casas was not able to defend it. After four years of inactivity, the title was vacated and put up in a tournament in May 2012 and has been active in IWRG since.

As it is a professional wrestling championship, the championship was not won not by actual competition, but by a scripted ending to a match determined by the bookers and match makers. (Note: Hornbaker (2016) p. 550: "Professional wrestling is a sport in which match finishes are predetermined. Thus, win–loss records are not indicative of a wrestler's genuine success based on their legitimate abilities – but on now much, or how little they were pushed by promoters") On occasion the promotion declares a championship vacant, which means there is no champion at that point in time. This can either be due to a storyline, (Note: Duncan & Will (2000) p. 271, Chapter: Texas: NWA American Tag Team Title [World Class, Adkisson] "Championship held up and rematch ordered because of the interference of manager Gary Hart") or real life issues such as a champion suffering an injury being unable to defend the championship, (Note: Duncan & Will (2000) p. 20, Chapter: (United States: 19th Century & widely defended titles – NWA, WWF, AWA, IW, ECW, NWA) NWA/WCW TV Title "Rhodes stripped on 85/10/19 for not defending the belt after having his leg broken by Ric Flair and Ole & Arn Anderson") or leaving the company. (Note: Duncan & Will (2000) p. 201, Chapter: (Memphis, Nashville) Memphis: USWA Tag Team Title "Vacant on 93/01/18 when Spike leaves the USWA.")

== Championship tournaments ==
Details of the initial tournament in July 1997 has not been verified only that Pantera II defeated Tony Rivera in the finals of an eight-man tournament.

=== November 2007 Championship tournament ===
IWRG stripped Pentagón Black of the championship and started an eight-man, single elimination tournament on October 15, 2007. The final match took place on November 1, 2007 at IWRG's annual El Castillo del Terror tournament.

Quarter-finals
1	Ultraman, Jr.	W
8	Oficial Fierro
4	Nitro
5	Negro Casas	W
2	Villano III	W
7	El Felino
3	Bogeman
6	Damian 666	W

semi-finals
Ultraman, Jr.
Negro Casas	W
Villano III	W
Damian 666

Finals
Negro Casas	W
Villano III

=== May 2012 Championship tournament ===
The Middleweight Championship had been inactive since late 2007 until May 1, 2012 when IWRG officially announced that the championship was vacated and would be decided in an eight-man tournament that was the focal point of their May 6, 2013 Caravan de Campeones show.

Quarter-finals
1	The Mummy	W
8	Tony Rivera
4	Oficial Spartan
5	Oficial AK-47	W
2	Veneno	W
7	El Hijo del Diablo
3	Dr. Cerebro
6	Super Nova	W

semi-finals
The Mummy
Oficial AK-47	W
Veneno	W
Super Nova

Finals
Oficial AK-47	W
Veneno

== Title history ==
Key
No.	Overall reign number
Reign	Reign number for the specific champion
Days	Number of days held
N/A	Unknown information
(NLT)	Championship change took place "no later than" the date listed
†	Championship change is unrecognized by the promotion
+	Current reign is changing daily

No.	Champion	Championship change			Reign statistics		Notes	Ref.
No.	Champion	Date	Event	Location	Reign	Days	Notes	Ref.
1	Pantera II	July 27, 1997	IWRG show	Naucalpan, State of Mexico	1	(Note: The exact date Pantera lost the Championship is not known placing the title reign between 1 and 342 days.)	Won an 8-man tournament by defeating Tony Rivera to become first champion.	
2	El Hijo del Gladiador	Unknown	IWRG show	Naucalpan, State of Mexico	1	(Note: The exact date Hijo del Gladiador won the Championship is not known placing the title reign between 1 and 342 days.)		
3	Magnum Tokyo	July 5, 1998	IWRG show	Naucalpan, State of Mexico	1	91		
4	Mr. Niebla	October 4, 1998	IWRG show	Naucalpan, State of Mexico	1	98		
5	Bombero Infernal	January 10, 1999	IWRG show	Naucalpan, State of Mexico	1	147		
6	Mr. Niebla	June 6, 1999	IWRG show	Naucalpan, State of Mexico	2	140	During this reign Mr. Niebla is unmasked and begins to work under the ring name Mr. Mexico.	
7	Bombero Infernal	October 24, 1999	IWRG show	Naucalpan, State of Mexico	2	53		
8	Último Vampiro (III)	December 16, 1999	IWRG show	Naucalpan, State of Mexico	1	24		
9	Black Dragon	January 9, 2000	IWRG show	Naucalpan, State of Mexico	1	315		
10	Bombero Infernal	November 19, 2000	IWRG show	Naucalpan, State of Mexico	3	126		
11	Último Vampiro (IV)	March 25, 2001	IWRG show	Naucalpan, State of Mexico	2	246		
12	Bombero Infernal	November 25, 2001	IWRG show	Naucalpan, State of Mexico	4	13		
13	Último Vampiro (IV)	December 2, 2001	IWRG show	Naucalpan, State of Mexico	3	53		
14	Pantera	January 24, 2002	IWRG show	Naucalpan, State of Mexico	2	49	Defeated Último Vampiro in a "title vs. mask" triangle match that also included Pentagón Black.	
15	Bombero Infernal	March 14, 2002	IWRG show	Naucalpan, State of Mexico	5	136		
16	Tony Rivera	July 28, 2002	IWRG show	Naucalpan, State of Mexico	1	28		
17	Último Vampiro (V)	August 25, 2002	IWRG show	Naucalpan, State of Mexico	1	569	A different wrestler had taken over the Último Vampiro character, but the reign was recognized as uninterrupted.	
—	Vacated	March 16, 2004	—	—	—	—	Championship vacated when Último Vampiro left the promotion	
18	Fantasy	March 18, 2004	Rey del Ring	Naucalpan, State of Mexico	1	66	Won the championship by winning the annual IWRG Rey del Ring tournament.	
19	Cerebro Negro	May 23, 2004	IWRG show	Naucalpan, State of Mexico	1	(Note: The exact date on which Cerebro Negro lost the title is not documented, which means the title reign lasted between 1 and 222 days.)		
20	Matrix	2004	IWRG show	Naucalpan, State of Mexico	6	(Note: The exact date on which Matrix won the title is not documented, which means the title reign lasted between 13 and 234 days.)	Previously won the title under the name Bombero Infernal.	
21	Veneno	January 13, 2005	IWRG show	Naucalpan, State of Mexico	1	147		
22	Black Dragon	June 9, 2005	IWRG show	Naucalpan, State of Mexico	2	7		
23	Veneno	June 16, 2005	IWRG show	Naucalpan, State of Mexico	2	35		
24	Cyborg	July 21, 2005	IWRG show	Naucalpan, State of Mexico	1	143		
25	Veneno	December 11, 2005	IWRG show	Naucalpan, State of Mexico	3	231		
26	Pantera	July 30, 2006	IWRG show	Naucalpan, State of Mexico	3	71		
27	Nitro	October 9, 2006	IWRG show	Naucalpan, State of Mexico	1	6		
28	Pentagón Black	October 15, 2006	IWRG show	Naucalpan, State of Mexico	1	365		
—	Vacated	October 15, 2007	—	—	—	—	Championship vacated when Pentagón Black left the promotion.	
29	Negro Casas	November 1, 2007	El Castillo del Terror	Naucalpan, State of Mexico	1	1,643	Defeated Villano III in the finals of an eight-man tournament to win the vacant title.	
—	Vacated	May 1, 2012	—	—	—	—	Championship officially vacated due to inactivity.	
30	Oficial AK-47	May 6, 2012	Caravana de Campeones	Naucalpan, State of Mexico	1	154	Defeated Veneno in the finals of an eight-man tournament to win the vacant title.	
31	El Ángel	October 7, 2012	Live event	Naucalpan, State of Mexico	1	186	This was a ten-man steel cage match, also involving Carta Brava Jr., Carta Brava Jr. (II), El Hijo del Dr. Wagner, El Hijo de Pirata Morgan, El Hijo de Máscara Año 2000, Oficial Factor, Veneno and Violencia Jr.	
32	Eterno	April 11, 2013	Live event	Naucalpan, State of Mexico	1	49		
33	El Hijo de Pirata Morgan	April 11, 2013	Live event	Naucalpan, State of Mexico	1	668		
34	Veneno	March 29, 2015	Live event	Naucalpan, State of Mexico	4	210		
35	Heddi Karaoui	October 25, 2015	Live event	Naucalpan, State of Mexico	1	315		
36	Imposible	September 4, 2016	La Hora de la Verdad	Naucalpan, State of Mexico	1	140		
37	Relámpago	January 22, 2017	IWRG House show	Naucalpan, State of Mexico	1	238		
38	Eterno	September 17, 2017	Caravana de Campeones	Naucalpan, State of Mexico	2	14		
39	Bombero Infernal	October 1, 2017	IWRG House show	Naucalpan, State of Mexico	7	324		
40	Dr. Cerebro	January 21, 2018	IWRG House show	Naucalpan, State of Mexico	1	231		
41	Imposible	September 9, 2018	Caravana de Campeones	Naucalpan, State of Mexico	2	479		
—	Vacated	January 1, 2020	—	—	—	—		
42	Demonio Infernal	January 1, 2020	Cinco Luchas en Jaula	Naucalpan, State of Mexico	1	298	Demonio Infernal defeated Fuerza Guerrera Nueva Generacion, Pasion Cristal, Ave Rex, Emperador Azteca, El Hijo del Alebrije in a Steel cage match for the "Briefcase of Glory" and the vacant title.	
43	Dragon Bane	October 25, 2020	Live event	Naucalpan, State of Mexico	1	469		
44	Travis Banks	February 6, 2022	IWRG El Protector 2022	Naucalpan, State of Mexico	1	56		
45	Dr. Cerebro	April 3, 2022	IWRG Guerra del Golfo 2022	Naucalpan, State of Mexico	2	56		
46	Tonalli	May 29, 2022	Live event	Naucalpan, State of Mexico	1	154		
47	Puma de Oro	October 30, 2022	IWRG Castillo Del Terror 2022	Naucalpan, State of Mexico	1	361	This was a title vs. title match in which Puma de Oro also defended the Mexico Championship.	
—	Vacated	February 18, 2024	—	—	—	—		
48	Noisy Boy	February 18, 2024	IWRG El Protector 2024	Naucalpan, State of Mexico	1	73	Defeated Aster Boy, El Hijo del Alebrije, Septimo Dragon and Spider Fly in a five-way match for the vacant title.	
49	Arez	May 1, 2024	IWRG Choque De Fieras Encadenados	Naucalpan, State of Mexico	1	596		
—	Vacated	December 18, 2025	—	—	—	—		
50	Toxin	December 18, 2025	IWRG Revolucion 63	Naucalpan, State of Mexico	1	122	Defeated Aeroboy, Látigo, Multifacetico Jr. and Septimo Dragon in a five-way match for the vacant title.	
51	Flamita	April 19, 2026	IWRG Guerra Del Golfo	Naucalpan, State of Mexico	1	186+		

== Combined reigns ==
†	Indicates the current champion
¤	The exact length of at least one title reign is uncertain, so the shortest possible length is used.
+	Indicates that the date changes daily for the current champion

Rank	Wrestler	No. of reigns	Combined days
1	Negro Casas	1	1,643
2	Bombero Infernal/Matrix	7	675¤
3	El Hijo de Pirata Morgan	1	668
4	Veneno	4	623
5	Imposible	2	619
6	Arez	1	596
7	Último Vampiro (V)	1	569
8	Puma de Oro	1	476
9	Dragon Bane	1	469
10	Pentagón Black	1	365
11	Black Dragon	2	322
12	Heddi Karaoui	1	315
13	Demonio Infernal	1	298
14	Dr. Cerebro	2	287
15	Último Vampiro (III)	3	280
16	Mr. Niebla	2	238
16	Relámpago	1	238
18	Flamita †	1	186+
19	El Ángel	1	186
20	Oficial AK-47	1	154
20	Tonalli	1	154
22	Cyborg	1	143
23	Toxin	1	122
24	Pantera / Pantera II	3	121¤
25	Magnum Tokyo	1	91
26	Noisy Boy	1	73
27	Fantasy	1	66
28	Eterno	2	63
29	Travis Banks	1	56
30	Tony Rivera	1	28
31	Nitro	1	6
32	El Hijo del Gladiador	1	N/A
32	Cerebro Negro	1	N/A
