= Demonio Infernal =

Mexican professional wrestler

Personal information
- Born: José Antonio Rojas; January 17, 1995 (age 31) Mexico City, Mexico
- Parent: Bombero Infernal (father)
- Relatives: Matrix Jr. (brother); Muerte Infernal (brother); Capitain Muerte (brother); La Bomberita (sister)

Professional wrestling career
- Ring names: Demonio Imperial; Demonio Infernal
- Trained by: Ringo Mendoza; Judas el Traidor; Black Terry; Arkangel de la Muerte
- Debut: 2013

José Antonio Rojas (born January 17, 1995) is a Mexican professional wrestler, best known under the ring name Demonio Infernal (Spanish for "Infernal Demon"). He is a second-generation wrestler, son of Guillermo Martinez Cid, best known as Bombero Infernal and the brother of wrestlers Matrix Jr., Muerte Infernal, Capitain Muerte and La Bomberita. Rojas made his in-ring debut in 2012, using the name Demonio Imperial.

He works for International Wrestling Revolution Group (IWRG) in the State of Mexico as well as taking bookings on the independent circuit in his country. Demonio Infernal, Eterno and Lunatic Xtreme (collectively known as "El Infierno Eternal") hold the Districto Federal Trios Championship and he is also the current IWRG Rey del Ring Champion as well as the IWRG Intercontinental Middleweight Champion. Rojas was originally a masked wrestler (Enmascarado in Spanish) but was forced to unmask in 2016 as he lost a Lucha de Apuestas bet match to Dragón Fly and has competed unmasked ever since.

== Personal life ==
José Antonio Rojas was born on January 17, 1995, in Mexico City. He is the son of Guillermo Martinez Cid, a professional wrestler best known under the ring name Bombero Infernal. His three younger brothers are also professional wrestlers, known as the masked wrestlers Matrix Jr., Muerte Infernal and Capitain Muerte respectively. His younger sister is also a professional, the enmascarada known as La Bomberita. As neither of his brothers nor his sister have been unmasked via a Lucha de Apuestas ("Bet match") loss, their names are not a matter of public record.

== Professional wrestling career ==
The first documented match for Rojas took place on June 10, 2015, for International Wrestling Revolution Group (IWRG). Roja, working under the ring name Demonio Imperial ("Imperial Demon") lost to Soldado de la Muerte in a five-way match that also included Canario, Magic Dragon and Vardeus. By early 2016 Roja changed his ring name to "Demonio Infernal" ("Internal Demon"). Over the summer of 2016, he became involved in a storyline feud with tecnico (also known as a "face"; the protagonists of professional wrestling) Dragón Fly. The feud between the two led to a Lucha de Apuestas ("Bet match") between the two, where the loser would have to unmask. Winning a Lucha de Apuestas match is considered more prestigious than winning a championship in lucha libre. The two faced off in the main event of IWRG's August 2016 Máscara vs. Máscara show, which saw Demonio Infernal lose, and thus had to unmask and reveal his real name as per the rules of the Lucha de Apuestas.

In early 2017, Demonio Infernal teamed up with professional wrestling veteran Negro Navarro for the 2017 El Protector tournament, a one-night tag team tournament where IWRG would team up a veteran wrestler with a relative rookie. The duo defeated Hip Hop Man and Mr. Electro in the first round, then defeated Demonio's longtime rival Dragón Fly and Villano IV in the semi-finals, before losing to Black Terry and El Diablo Jr. in the finals of the tournament.

At IWRG's 2017 Prisión Fatal, Demonio Infernal defeated Lunatic Xtreme in a no disqualification match in the opening match of the show. The feud between the two ran over several months and saw Lunatic Xtreme defeat Demonio Infernal in a Lucha de Apuestas match on January 28, 2018, forcing Demonio Infernal to have all his hair shaved off as a result. Later on, Demonio Infernal began to team regularly with Lunatic Xtreme as their feud had been settled, and Eterno, forming a trio known as El Infierno Eterno ("The Eternal Inferno"). Demonio was one of four wrestlers risking their mask or hair on the outcome of the main event of IWRG's Relevos Increibles de Máscaras y Cabelleras show. Demonio Infernal and Freelance lost to Aramís and Dragón Bane. Due to the loss Demonio and Freelance had to face each other immediately, with Freelance losing the match and also losing his hair as a result. On February 3, 2019, El Infierno Eterno defeated Los Comandos Elite (Rayan, Spector, and Liderk) to win the Distrito Federal Trios Championship.

On May 19, 2019, Demonio Infernal outlasted 29 other wrestlers to win the 2019 Rey del Ring tournament, as well as the IWRG Rey del Ring Championship. Near the end of 2019, Demonio Infernal became involved in a storyline feud against Fresero Jr., which included Demonio Infernal successfully defending the Rey del Ring Championship against Fresero Jr. On the October 27 IWRG show Fresero Jr. helped El Hijo de Canis Lupus defend the IWRG Intercontinental Heavyweight Championship against Demonio Infernal by interfering in the match. Following the match Demonio Infernal made a Lucha de Apuestas, "hair vs hair" match challenge. Fresero Jr. defeated Demonio Infernal in a Super Libre, no disqualification match, on November 24, followed by accepting the Apuesta challenge. in the end Demonio Infernal defeated Fresero Jr. in a Lucha de Apuestas match at the PALL 1st Anniversary Show on December 1, 2019. On January 1, 2020, as part of IWRG's Cinco Luchas en Jaula show, Demonio Infernal won a six-way steel cage match against Fuerza Guerrera Nueva Generacion, Pasion Cristal, Ave Rex, Emperador Azteca, El Hijo del Alebrije to win the vacant IWRG Intercontinental Middleweight Championship

== Championships and accomplishments ==
- International Wrestling Revolution Group
  - IWRG Intercontinental Middleweight Championship (1 time)
  - IWRG Rey del Ring Championship (1 time)
  - Distrito Federal Trios Championship (1 time, current) – with Eterno and Lunatic Xtreme
- Kaoz Lucha Libre
  - Kaoz Tag Team Championship (1 time) - with Fresero Jr.
- Nueva Generation Extrema
  - NGX Tag Team Championship (1 time, current) - with Fresero Jr.

== Luchas de Apuestas record ==
Winner (wager)	Loser (wager)	Location	Event	Date	Notes
Dragón Fly (mask)	Demonio Infernal (mask)	Naucalpan, State of Mexico	Máscara vs. Máscara	August 3, 2016	
Lunatic Xtreme (hair)	Demonio Infernal (hair)	Naucalpan, State of Mexico	IWRG show	January 28, 2018	
Demonio Infernal (hair)	Freelance (hair)	Naucalpan, State of Mexico	Relevos Increibles de Máscaras y Cabelleras	October 7, 2018	
Demonio Infernal (hair)	Fresero Jr. (hair)	Naucalpan, State of Mexico	PALL 1st Anniversary Show	December 1, 2019	
Demonio Infernal (mask)	Mamba(hair)	Tijuana, Baja California	Crash XIV Anniverasio	November 7, 2025	
