= Hologram (wrestler) =

Mexican professional wrestler

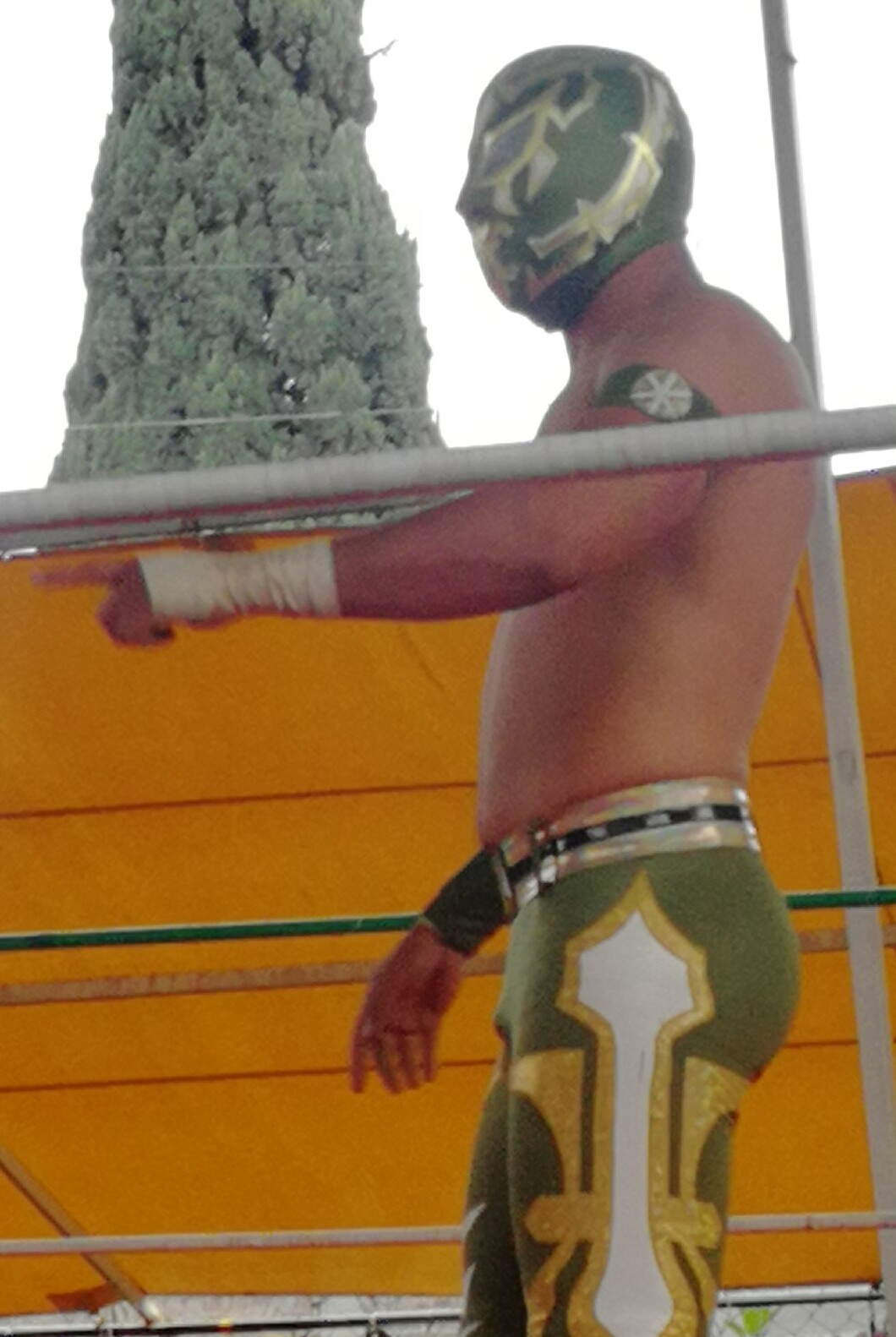
- Hologram as Aramís in 2020

Personal information
- Born: December 12 Coacalco de Berriozábal, State of Mexico, Mexico

Professional wrestling career
- Ring name(s): Aramís; Hologram
- Billed weight: 170 lb (77 kg)
- Billed from: Coacalco de Berriozábal, Mexico; Teotihuacan, Mexico
- Debut: 2010

Hologram is a Mexican professional wrestler. He is signed to All Elite Wrestling (AEW), where he is a member of The Conglomeration. He is currently out of action due to a knee injury in September 2025. He also makes appearances for Consejo Mundial de Lucha Libre (CMLL). He is known for his time as Aramís with Lucha Libre AAA Worldwide (AAA) and International Wrestling Revolution Group. As Aramís, he participated in Pro Wrestling Guerrilla's Battle of Los Angeles 2019 event, which was his United States debut.

His real name is not a matter of public record, as is often the case with masked wrestlers in Mexico, where their private lives are kept a secret from the professional wrestling fans.

== Career ==
=== Early career (2010–2018) ===
In 2010, Aramís wrestled his first matches on the Mexican independent scene.

In 2015, Aramís founded the group Los Kamikazes del Aire with Iron Kid and Alas de Acero. The group also featured Bandido while Iron Kid toured in Macau for a year. The group had success in IWRG and the independent wrestling scene in Mexico.

=== Lucha Libre AAA Worldwide (2018–2024) ===
In 2018, he began wrestling in Lucha Libre AAA Worldwide (AAA) under a free contract where he is allowed to work independently, and has therefore appeared in many other federations and events in the independent scene of Mexico and the United States. He also has fought in Lucha Memes, MexaWrestling and others. In the United States he has fought in Pro Wrestling Guerrilla and participated in their Battle of Los Angeles tournament in 2019.

=== All Elite Wrestling (2024–present) ===
In February 2024, Aramís signed with All Elite Wrestling (AEW). In July 2024, All Elite Wrestling (AEW) aired vignettes of a new wrestler called Hologram, which is a gimmick created by AEW owner and head of creative Tony Khan. It was later reported that Aramís would be portraying the character. Hologram made his in-ring debut on the July 20 episode of AEW Collision, defeating Gringo Loco. In October 2024, Hologram began a feud with La Faccíon Ingobernable or LFI (Rush, Dralístico, and The Beast Mortos). This led to a 2 out of 3 falls match between Hologram and Mortos at WrestleDream, where Hologram was pinned for the first time in AEW but went on to win the match 2-1. On the October 19 episode of Collision, Hologram was attacked backstage by LFI. This was done to write him off television after suffering an ankle injury.

On the January 25, 2025 Homecoming edition of Collision, vignettes teasing a return started airing weekly. On the February 8, 2025 episode of Collision, Hologram returned from injury, aiding Komander from an attack by LFI. The team of Hologram and Komander went by the name Los Titanes del Aire, which translates to "The Titans of the Air". However, the team went on hiatus after Komander suffered a legitmate injury, leaving Hologram as a singles wrestler. In the summer, Hologam would join the Conglomeration and started a storyline, where he had a doppelganger, named El Clon. In September 2025, Hologram also was removed from television after he suffered a knee injury.

=== Consejo Mundial de Lucha Libre (2025–present) ===
As part of the relationship between AEW and CMLL, on March 21, 2025, Hologram and Komander made their Consejo Mundial de Lucha Libre (CMLL) at Homenaje a Dos Leyendas, where they faced Místico and Máscara Dorada in a losing effort. He also worked on other CMLL shows, like Fantastica Mania Mexico.

== Championships and accomplishments ==
- International Wrestling Revolution Group
  - IWRG Rey del Aire Championship (1 time)
  - IWRG Intercontinental Tag Team Championship (1 time) – with Imposible
- Lucha Memes / MexaWrestling
  - Battle of Naucalpan (2019)
- Profesionales de Lucha Libre Mexicana
  - Nuevos Valore tournament (2012)
- Promociones Cara Lucha
  - Bestiario I Tournament (2015)
- Pro Wrestling Illustrated
  - Ranked No. 106 of the top 500 singles wrestlers in the PWI 500 in 2025

== Luchas de Apuestas record ==
Winner (wager)	Loser (wager)	Location	Event	Date	Notes
Aramís (mask)	Agora (hair)	Coacalco, State of Mexico	PROLLM Show	May 20, 2012	
Aramís (mask)	Dragon Negro (mask)	Coacalco, State of Mexico	PROLLM Show	June 30, 2013	
Aramís (mask)	Madison Kid (hair)	Naucalpan, State of Mexico	IWRG Show	April 6, 2016	(Note: They were the final two in a Ruleta de la Muerte tournament that also included Adrenalina, Atomic Star, Blue Monster, Dragón Fly, Fly Star, Fresero Jr., Galaxy, Kaiser Dragon, Komachi, Salachichita, Shadow Boy and Toxin Boy.)
Aramís (mask)	Eterno (hair)	Coacalco, State of Mexico	Lucha Memes show	October 21, 2018	
