= IWRG Intercontinental Heavyweight Championship =

Professional wrestling championship by International Wrestling Revolution Group

- The belt representing the heavyweight championship

Details
- Promotion: International Wrestling Revolution Group
- Date established: September 28, 1997
- Current champion: DMT Azul
- Date won: October 31, 2025
Statistics
- First champion: Pierroth Jr.
- Most reigns: Scorpio Jr. and Máscara Año 2000 Jr. (4 reigns)
- Longest reign: Canek (1,444 days)
- Shortest reign: Gianni Valletta (11 days)

The IWRG Intercontinental Heavyweight Championship (Campeon Intercontinental Peso Completo IWRG in Spanish) is a singles Championship in the Mexican professional wrestling promotion International Wrestling Revolution Group (IWRG) and was introduced in 1997. It has since been defended throughout Mexico, primarily in Naucalpan, but also in Japan as well. As the Championship is designated as a heavyweight title, it can only officially be competed for by wrestlers weighing at least 105 kg (231 lb).

The current champion is DMT Azul, who defeated previous champion Dr. Wagner Jr., Chessman and Pirata Morgan for the championship on October 31, 2025. The first holder of the IWRG Intercontinental Heavyweight Championship was Pierroth Jr. who won the title on September 28, 1997 defeating Black Magic in the finals of an eight-man tournament. There have been twenty-five recognized champions, combining for thirty-four total reigns. Máscara Año 2000 Jr. and Scorpio Jr. are tied for most championship reigns, with four each. El Canek holds the record for the longest individual reign 1,444 days (from May 5, 2006 to April 18, 2010, although his reign had a long period of inactivity). Valletta's first reign lasted 11 days, the shortest of any champion.

As it is a professional wrestling championship, the title was not won not by actual competition, but by a scripted ending to a match determined by the bookers and match makers. (Note: Hornbaker (2016) p. 550: "Professional wrestling is a sport in which match finishes are predetermined. Thus, win–loss records are not indicative of a wrestler's genuine success based on their legitimate abilities – but on now much, or how little they were pushed by promoters") On occasion the promotion declares a championship vacant, which means there is no champion at that point in time. This can either be due to a storyline, (Note: Duncan & Will (2000) p. 271, Chapter: Texas: NWA American Tag Team Title [World Class, Adkisson] "Championship held up and rematch ordered because of the interference of manager Gary Hart") or real life issues such as a champion suffering an injury being unable to defend the championship, (Note: Duncan & Will (2000) p. 20, Chapter: (United States: 19th Century & widely defended titles – NWA, WWF, AWA, IW, ECW, NWA) NWA/WCW TV Title "Rhodes stripped on 85/10/19 for not defending the belt after having his leg broken by Ric Flair and Ole & Arn Anderson") or leaving the company. (Note: Duncan & Will (2000) p. 201, Chapter: (Memphis, Nashville) Memphis: USWA Tag Team Title "Vacant on 93/01/18 when Spike leaves the USWA.")

== Title history ==
Key
No.	Overall reign number
Reign	Reign number for the specific champion
Days	Number of days held
N/A	Unknown information
+	Current reign is changing daily

No.	Champion	Championship change			Reign statistics		Notes	Ref.
No.	Champion	Date	Event	Location	Reign	Days	Notes	Ref.
1	Pierroth Jr.	September 28, 1997	IWRG show	Naucalpan, State of Mexico	1	672	Defeated Black Magic in the finals of an eight-man tournament.	
2	Pirata Morgan	August 1, 1999	IWRG show	Naucalpan, State of Mexico	1	114		
3	Super Parka	November 23, 1999	Live event	Yokkaichi, Japan	1	23		
4	Scorpio Jr.	December 16, 1999	IWRG show	Naucalpan, State of Mexico	1	609		
5	Tinieblas Jr.	August 16, 2001	IWRG show	Naucalpan, State of Mexico	1	378		
6	Scorpio Jr.	August 29, 2002	IWRG show	Naucalpan, State of Mexico	2	273		
7	El Enterrador	May 29, 2003	IWRG show	Naucalpan, State of Mexico	1	136		
8	Tinieblas Jr.	October 12, 2003	IWRG show	Naucalpan, State of Mexico	2	123		
9	Villano IV	February 12, 2004	IWRG show	Naucalpan, State of Mexico	1	210		
10	Scorpio Jr.	September 9, 2004	IWRG show	Naucalpan, State of Mexico	3	245		
11	Heavy Metal	May 12, 2005	IWRG show	Naucalpan, State of Mexico	1	224		
12	Scorpio Jr.	December 22, 2005	Guerra del Golfo	Naucalpan, State of Mexico	4	(Note: The exact date Scorpio Jr. left IWRG is not known placing the title reign between 41 and 68 days.)		
—	Vacated	February 2006	—	—	—	—	Championship vacated when Scorpio Jr. left the promotion.	
13	Canek	May 5, 2006	IWRG show	Naucalpan, State of Mexico	1	1,444	Defeated Rayo de Jalisco Jr. in a Relevos Increibles, that saw Perro Aguayo Jr. and Headhunter A against Canek and Jalisco.	
14	Máscara Año 2000 Jr.	April 18, 2010	IWRG show	Naucalpan, State of Mexico	1	67		
15	Silver King	June 24, 2010	IWRG show	Naucalpan, State of Mexico	1	479		
16	Taboo	October 16, 2011	Dr. Wagner 50th Anniversary Show	Naucalpan, State of Mexico	1	70	This was an elimination steel cage Title vs. Masks match, also involving Dr. Wagner Jr. and La Parka.	
17	Headhunter I	December 25, 2011	Guerra de Campeones	Naucalpan, State of Mexico	1	179	This was a three-way Bullterrier match, also involving Electroshock.	
18	Cien Caras Jr.	June 21, 2012	IWRG show	Naucalpan, State of Mexico	1	584	Won the match and the title via disqualification. (Note: In IWRG, as with a number of Lucha Libre promotions, a championship can change hands on a disqualification victory.)	
19	Vampiro Canadiense	January 26, 2014	IWRG show	Naucalpan, State of Mexico	1	161		
—	Vacated	July 6, 2014	—	—	—	—	Championship declared vacant by IWRG due to Vampiro not working for IWRG for an extended period of time.	
20	El Hijo de Dos Caras	July 20, 2014	IWRG show	Naucalpan, State of Mexico	1	448	This was a six-way ladder match, also involving Demon Clown, Dr. Wagner Jr., L.A. Park, Máscara Sagrada and Pirata Morgan.	
21	Máscara Año 2000 Jr.	October 11, 2015	Caravana de Campeones	Naucalpan, State of Mexico	2	21		
22	El Hijo de Dos Caras	November 1, 2015	Castillo del Terror	Naucalpan, State of Mexico	2	105		
23	Trauma I	February 14, 2016	Live event	Naucalpan, State of Mexico	1	70	This match also involved Herodes Jr.	
23	Máscara Año 2000 Jr.	April 24, 2016	IWRG show	Naucalpan, State of Mexico	3	49		
24	Mr. Electro	June 12, 2016	IWRG show	Naucalpan, State of Mexico	1	56	Won the match and the championship by disqualification	
25	Trauma I	August 7, 2016	Máscara vs. Cabellera	Naucalpan, State of Mexico	2	133		
26	Mr. Electro	December 18, 2016	IWRG show	Naucalpan, State of Mexico	2	733	Won the match and the championship by disqualification	
27	Máscara Año 2000 Jr.	December 21, 2018	Arena Naucalpan 41st Anniversary Show	Naucalpan, State of Mexico	4	114	This was a triple threat apuestas match, also including Toscano. Máscara Año 2000 Jr. and Toscano put their hairs on the line	
28	El Hijo de Canis Lupus	April 14, 2019	IWRG 80. Torneo FILL	Naucalpan, State of Mexico	1	546	El Hijo de Canis Lupus defeated Máscara Año 2000 Jr. by count-out. Even so, it was considered a title change.	
29	Fresero Jr.	October 11, 2020	N/A	Naucalpan, State of Mexico	1	329		
—	Vacated	September 5, 2021	—	—	—	—		
30	Gianni Valletta	September 5, 2021	IWRG show	Naucalpan, State of Mexico	1	11		
31	El Hijo del Espectro Jr.	September 16, 2021	IWRG show	Naucalpan, State of Mexico	1	328		
—	Vacated	August 10, 2022	—	—	—	—		
32	Galeno del Mal	August 21, 2022	Caravana de Campeones	Naucalpan, State of Mexico	1	438	Defeated AK47 to win the vacant championship.	
33	DMT Azul	November 2, 2023	Castillo del Terror	Naucalpan, State of Mexico	1	426	This was a five-way elimination match, also involving Ivan Rokov, Vito Fratelli and Hijo del Pirata Morgan.	
34	Dr. Wagner Jr.	January 1, 2025	IWRG Guerreros De Acero 2025	Naucalpan, State of Mexico	1	303		
35	DMT Azul	October 31, 2025	Castillo del Terror	Naucalpan, State of Mexico	2	385+	This was a four-way Casket match, also involving Chessman and Pirata Morgan.	

== Combined reigns ==
†	Indicates the current champion
¤	The exact length of at least one title reign is too uncertain to calculate.

Rank	Wrestler	Nr. of reigns	Combined days
1	Canek	1	1,444
2	Scorpio Jr.	4	1,127¤
3	El Hijo de Dos Caras	2	906
4	DMT Azul †	2	811+
5	Mr. Electro	2	796
6	Pierroth Jr.	1	672
7	Cien Caras Jr.	1	584
8	El Hijo de Canis Lupus	1	546
9	Silver King	1	479
10	Galeno del Mal	1	438
11	Tinieblas Jr.	2	379
12	Fresero Jr.	1	329
13	El Hijo del Espectro Jr.	1	328
14	Dr. Wagner Jr.	1	303
15	Máscara Año 2000 Jr.	4	251
16	Heavy Metal	1	224
17	Villano IV	1	210
18	Trauma I	1	204
19	Headhunter I	1	179
20	Vampiro Canadiense	1	161
21	El Enterrador	1	136
22	Pirata Morgan	1	114
23	Taboo	1	70
24	Super Parka	1	23
25	Gianni Valletta	1	11
