= El Castillo del Terror (2019) =

2019 International Wrestling Revolution Group event

- Official poster for the event
- Promotion: International Wrestling Revolution Group
- Date: October 31, 2019
- City: Naucalpan, State of Mexico
- Venue: Arena Naucalpan

Event chronology
← Previous; La Jaula de Las Locas	Next → PALL 1st Anniversary Show

El Castillo del Terror chronology
← Previous; 2018	Next → —

El Castillo del Terror (2019) (Spanish for "The Tower of Terror") iwas a major professional wrestling event, the eleventh annual El Castillo del Terror event, scripted and produced by the International Wrestling Revolution Group (IWRG) that took place on October 31, 2019. IWRG has held their Castillo del Terror show since 2005, usually late in the year. As with the majority of the IWRG shows it will take place at Arena Naucalpan in Naucalpan, State of Mexico, the home of IWRG. The main event is the eponymous Castillo del Terror Steel cage match where the last person eliminated would be forced to unmasked per the Lucha de Apuestas, or "bet match", stipulation.

In the main event, 12 men (Ave Rex, Dragón Bane, Imposible, El Hijo de Canis Lupus, Dinamic Black, Toxin, Aramis, Relámpago, Capo del Norte, Tortuga Leo, Ángel Tormenta and Death Metal) risked their mask in a steel cage match where the last wrestler remaining will be forced to unmask. In the end Ángel Tormenta was the last man in the cage as El Hijo de Canis Lupus climbed out. Ángel Tormenta unmasked afterwards and revealed that his real name was Jorge Alberto Flores Perez and he had been a professional wrestler for three years at that point. The show also featured a Super Libre match between Los Traumas (Trauma I and Trauma II) and Los Lucha Brothers (Penta el 0M (Rey Fénix), in which Los Lucha Brothers won by disqualification.

== Production ==
=== Background ===
Starting as far back as at least 2002, the Mexican wrestling promotion International Wrestling Revolution Group (IWRG; Sometimes referred to as Grupo Internacional Revolución in Spanish) has held several annual events where the main event was a multi-man steel cage match where the last wrestler left in the cage would be forced to either remove their wrestling mask or have their hair shaved off under Lucha de Apuestas, or "bet match", rules. From 2005 IWRG has promoted a fall show, around the Mexican Day of the Death, under the name El Castillo del Terror ("The Tower of Terror"), to distinguish it from other Steel cage matches held throughout the year such as the IWRG Guerra del Golfo ("Gulf War"), IWRG Guerra de Sexos ("War of the Sexes"), or IWRG Prisión Fatal ("Deadly Prison") shows. The Castillo del Terror shows, as well as the majority of the IWRG shows in general, are held in "Arena Naucalpan", owned by the promoters of IWRG and their main arena. The 2019 Castillo del Terror show will be the 15th year in a row that IWRG has promoted a show under that name.

=== Storylines ===
The El Castillo del Terror event featured six professional wrestling matches with different wrestlers involved in pre-existing scripted feuds, plots and storylines. Wrestlers portrayed themselves as either heels (referred to as rudos in Mexico, those that portray the "bad guys") or faces (técnicos in Mexico, the "good guy" characters) as they followed a series of tension-building events, which culminated in wrestling matches.

== Matches ==
No.	Results	Stipulations
1	Auzter and Shadow Boy defeated Güero Palma and Neza Kid	Tag team match
2	Atomic Star, Freelance, and Puma de Oro defeated Avisman, Fulgor I, and Fulgor II	Six-man tag team match
3	Los Exotics (Diva Salvaje, Jessy Ventura, and Pasion Kristal) defeated Los Oficiales (Oficial 911, Oficial AK-47, and Oficial Fierro) by disqualification	Six-woman tag team match
4	Demonio Infernal and Ludark Shartain defeated Diosa Quetzal /The Tiger and Lady Flamer/Fly Star	Intergender, three team Ladder match
5	Los Lucha Brothers (Penta el 0M and Rey Fénix) defeated Los Traumas (Trauma I and Trauma II) by disqualification	Super Libre Tag team match
6	El Hijo de Canis Lupus defeated Ángel Tormenta; Also in the match: Ave Rex, Dragón Bane, Imposible, Dinamic Black, Toxin, Aramis, Relámpago, Capo del Norte, Tortuga Leo, and Death Metal	multi-person El Castillo del Terror, Luchas de Apuestas, Mask vs. Mask match
