= Arena Naucalpan 41st Anniversary Show =

2018 International Wrestling Revolution Group event

- Official poster for the event
- Promotion: International Wrestling Revolution Group
- Date: December 21, 2018
- City: Naucalpan, State of Mexico
- Venue: Arena Naucalpan
- Tagline(s): Guerra de Familias (War of the Families)

Event chronology
← Previous; 56th Anniversary of Lucha Libre in Estado de México	Next → IWRG 23rd Anniversary Show

Arena Naucalpan Anniversary Shows chronology
← Previous; 40th Anniversary	Next → 42nd Anniversary

The Arena Naucalpan 41st Anniversary Show (Spanish: 41. Aniversario Arena Naucalpan), also billed as Guerra de Familias was a professional wrestling supercard event scripted and produced by Mexican professional wrestling promotion International Wrestling Revolution Group (IWRG). The show took place on December 21, 2018 in Arena Naucalpan, Naucalpan, State of Mexico, Mexico. The show celebrated the 41st Anniversary of the construction of Arena Naucalpan, IWRG's main venue where they hold the majority of their shows.

The main event was originally scheduled to be L.A. Park against Penta 0M as result of IWRG's Triangular en Jaula, but instead if featured the Guerra de Familiars, or "Family War" between the father/son teams of L.A. Park/El Hijo de L.A. Park and Dr. Wagner Jr./El Hijo de Dr. Wagner Jr. with the Parks winning the match. In the semi-main event Máscara Año 2000 Jr. defeated Mr. Electro to win the IWRG Intercontinental Heavyweight Championship. As part of the show Dragón Bane successfully defended the WRG Rey del Aire Championship and Imposible defended the IWRG Intercontinental Middleweight Championship. The show featured three additional matches.

== Production ==
=== Background ===
Promoter Adolfo Moreno had promoted Lucha Libre, or professional wrestling in Naucalpan, State of Mexico, Mexico prior to financing the building of Arena Naucalpan that opened in late 1976. Originally Moreno worked together with the Universal Wrestling Association (UWA) and then later Consejo Mundial de Lucha Libre (CMLL) as a local promoter. On January 1, 1996 Moreno created International Wrestling Revolution Group (IWRG) as an independent promotion. IWRG celebrates the anniversary of Arena Naucalpan each year in December with a major show, making it the second oldest, still promoted show series in the world. pre-dating WrestleMania by eight years. Only the CMLL Anniversary Show series has a longer history. The 2017 Arena Naucalpan anniversary show marked the 40th Anniversary of Arena Naucalpan. The Anniversary shows, as well as the majority of the IWRG shows in general are held in Arena Naucalpan.

=== Storylines ===
The Arena Naucalpan 41st Anniversary Show featured a total of seven professional wrestling matches with different wrestlers involved in pre-existing scripted feuds, plots and storylines. Wrestlers portrayed themselves as either heels (referred to as rudos in Mexico, those that portray the "bad guys") or faces (técnicos in Mexico, the "good guy" characters) as they followed a series of tension-building events, which culminated in a wrestling match or series of matches.

The original main event of the 41st Anniversary Show was originally determined at IWRG's Triangular en Jaula show long-time rivals Rush, Penta 0M and L.A. Park wrestled each other in a steel cage match. The stipulation of the cage was that, the first to escape the cage would not have to return a month later to compete in the main event of the Arena Naucalpan 41st Anniversary Show. RUsh left the cage first, which meant the main event was set as L.A. Park facing Penta 0M. When the full card for the 41st anniversary show Penta Om was not listed instead LA.. Park and his son, El Hijo de L.A. Park, would face his long time rival Rey Wagner and Wagner's son El Hijo de Dr. Wagner Jr.

== Event ==
After the Parks defeated the Wagners in the main event, El Galeno del Mal ("The Bad Doctor") appeared and helped the Wagners beat up L.A. Park and his son. Afterwards El Galeno del Mal was introduced to the audience as the half brother of El Hijo de Dr. Wagner Jr., son of Rey Wagner's ex-wife Rossy Moreno.

== Results ==
No.	Results	Stipulations
1	Lili Dark and Ludark Shaitan defeated Dulce Luna and Quimera	tag team match
2	Death Metal and Las Tortugas Negras (Ra-Zhata and Shil-Ka) defeated Black Dragón, Dinamic Black, and Multifacético	Six-man tag team match
3	Imposible (c) defeated Eterno	Singles match for the IWRG Intercontinental Middleweight Championship
4	Demonio Infernal, El Hijo de Canis Lupus, and Lunatic Xtreme defeated Aramís, El Hijo del Alebrije, and Relámpago	Six-man tag team match
5	Dragón Bane (c) defeated Freelance	Singles match for the IWRG Rey del Aire Championship
6	Máscara Año 2000 Jr. (hair) defeated Mr. Electro (c), also in the match: Toscano (hair)	Three way Lucha de Apuestas, IWRG Intercontinental Heavyweight Championship vs. hair vs. hair, match
7	LA Park and El Hijo de LA Park defeated Rey Wagner and El Hijo del Dr. Wagner Jr.	Tag team match
(c) / – the champion(s) heading into the match
