= 52nd Anniversary of Lucha Libre in Estado de México =

2014 International Wrestling Revolution Group event

- Official poster of the event
- Promotion: International Wrestling Revolution Group
- Date: December 7, 2014
- City: Naucalpan, State of Mexico
- Venue: Arena Naucalpan

Event chronology
← Previous; El Castillo del Terror	Next → Caravana de Campeones

Anniversary of Lucha Libre in Estado de México Shows chronology
← Previous; 51st Anniversary	Next → 53rd Anniversary

The 52nd Anniversary of Lucha Libre in Estado de México was celebrated by a major professional wrestling show produced and scripted by the Mexican lucha libre promotion International Wrestling Revolution Group (IWRG; sometimes referred to as Grupo Internacional Revolución in Mexico) and took place on December 7, 2014 in Arena Naucalpan, Naucalpan, State of Mexico (Estado de México). The event commemorated the sport of lucha libre becoming allowed in the State of Mexico, with the first lucha libre show held in the state taking place in December 1962. Over the years IWRG has on occasion celebrated the anniversary, although not consistently holding an anniversary show every year.

The main event was a Lucha de Apuestas, or "bet match", where Toscano and Veneno both "bet" their hair on the outcome of the match. After the loss, Veneno was forced to have all his hair shaved off. The show featured five additional matches including a "No Disqualification" or Super Libre match with Eterno and Canis Lupus defeated the team of Danny Casas and Oficial 911.

== Production ==
=== Background ===
The history of lucha libre, or professional wrestling in Mexico goes all the way back to the early 1900s where individual promoters would hold shows on a local basis in various Mexican states. In 1933 Salvador Lutteroth created Empresa Mexicana de Lucha Libre (EMLL; Spanish for "Mexican Wrestling Enterprise") and in subsequent years took EMLL to a national level. In the 1930s and 1940s various Mexican starts to create lucha libre commissions, often as an extension of the existing Boxing commissions, responsible for overview of lucha libre in each state, licensing wrestlers and ensuring the rules are being enforced. In the State of Mexico lucha libre was not officially sanctioned in late 1962, with the first lucha libre show in the State of Mexico held in December 1962.

The Mexican wrestling promotion International Wrestling Revolution Group (IWRG; Sometimes referred to as Grupo Internacional Revolución in Spanish) has on occasion held a major show in December to commemorate the "birth" of Lucha Libre in their home state. It is unclear exactly when IWRG started to mark the Anniversary, records confirm that they held a show to commemorate the event starting in 2010 commemorating the 48th Anniversary of Lucha Libre in Estado de México, possibly prior to that. The 2014 show was for the 52nd anniversary and was held on December 7, 2014 in Arena Naucalpan, Naucalpan, State of Mexico where IWRG holds almost all of their major lucha libre shows.

=== Storylines ===
The event featured five professional wrestling matches with different wrestlers involved in pre-existing scripted feuds, plots and storylines. Wrestlers were portrayed as either heels (referred to as rudos in Mexico, those that portray the "bad guys") or faces (técnicos in Mexico, the "good guy" characters) as they followed a series of tension-building events, which culminated in a wrestling match or series of matches.

== Event ==
In the second match of the night the team of Los Tortugas Ninjas ("The Ninja Turtles"; Leo, Mike, Rafy and Teelo; a team of four wrestlers dressed like the Teenage Mutant Ninja Turtle characters) defeated a team composed of Los Gringos VIP (Apolo Estrada Jr. and Avisman) and two members of Los Comandos Elite (Oficial Liderk and Oficial Rayan) two falls to one.

For the third match Los Traumas (Trauma I and Trauma II) teamed up with Chicano to defeat the team of Emperador Azteca and Los Terribles Cerebros ("The Terrible Brains"; Dr. Cerebro and Black Terry. Following their victory, the Trauma brothers once again attacked their own father, Negro Navarro. Moments later Black Terry returned to the ring to stop Los Traumas, but the brothers attacked him as well.

The fourth match was a tag team match fought under Super Libre, or "no disqualification" rules. As a result of everything being legal, the match included the user of steel folding chairs and other weapons, resulting in all four wrestlers bleeding during the match. The end came when Oficial 911 turned on his partner Danny Casas after Casas had accidentally hit 911 earlier in the match. The turn allowed Eterno and Canis Lupus to win the match.

The fifth match of the night featured the decades-long rivalry between Máscara Año 2000 and Rayo de Jalisco Jr. For the match Máscara Año 2000 teamed up with his son El Hijo del Máscara Año 2000 and Cien Caras Jr. (in storyline terms he was the nephew of Máscara Año 2000 but in reality was not related to Cien Caras). For his team Rayo de Jalisco Jr. teamed up with second-generation wrestlers El Hijo de Dos Caras and Súper Nova (Son of El Texano). In the third fall, Máscara Año 2000 passed a steel chain to Cien Caras Jr., which he struck Rayo de Jalisco Jr. with to gain the third and deciding pinfall. Following the match both Máscara Año 2000 and Rayo de Jalisco Jr. made various challenges to each other.

Tortuga Rafy was originally announced as Toscano's corner-man for the main event, but when Veneno brought Mascara Ano 2000 to the ring as his cornerman Mascara Ano 2000's long-time rival Rayo de Jalisco Jr. came out and replaced Rafy. During the third and deciding fall Mascara Ano 2000 threw a small steel chain to Veneno and then distracted the referee as Veneno struck Toscano with the chain. At that point, Rayo de Jalisco Jr. jumped up on the apron to protest. The further distraction allowed Toscano to recover and surprise Veneno with a roll up to pin him and win the match. After the match Veneno remained in the ring to have all his hair shaved off.

=== Results ===
No.	Results	Stipulations
1^{D}	Metaleon defeated Araña de Plata Jr.	Best two-out-of-three falls match
2	Los Tortugas Ninjas (Leo, Mike, Rafy and Teelo) defeated Apolo Estrada Jr., Avisman and Los Comandos Elite (Oficial Liderk and Oficial Rayan)	Best two-out-of-three falls six-man tag team match
3	Chicano and Los Traumas (Trauma I and Trauma II) defeated Dr. Cerebro, Emperador Azteca and Negro Navarro	Best two-out-of-three falls six-man tag team match
4	Canis Lupus and Eterno defeated Danny Casas and Oficial 911	Super Libre, no disqualification tag team match.
5	La Familia del Dinamita (Cien Caras Jr., El Hijo del Máscara Año 2000 and Máscara Año 2000) defeated El Hijo de Dos Caras, Rayo de Jalisco Jr. and Súper Nova	Best two-out-of-three falls six-man tag team match
6	Toscano defeated Veneno	Best two-out-of-three falls Lucha de Apuestas, hair vs. hair match
D / – this was a dark match

== See also ==
- 2014 in professional wrestling
- Professional wrestling in Mexico
