= Arena Naucalpan 40th Anniversary Show =

2017 International Wrestling Revolution Group event

- Official poster for the event
- Promotion: International Wrestling Revolution Group
- Date: December 17, 2017
- City: Naucalpan, State of Mexico
- Venue: Arena Naucalpan

Event chronology
← Previous; 55th Anniversary of Lucha Libre in Estado de México	Next → IWRG 22nd Anniversary Show

Arena Naucalpan Anniversary Shows chronology
← Previous; 39th Anniversary	Next → 41st Anniversary

The Arena Naucalpan 40th Anniversary Show was a major annual professional wrestling event produced by Mexican professional wrestling promotion International Wrestling Revolution Group (IWRG), which took place on December 17, 2017 in Arena Naucalpan, Naucalpan, State of Mexico, Mexico. The show celebrated the 40th Anniversary of the construction of Arena Naucalpan, IWRG's main venue.

The main event was supposed to be Oficial Rayan facing off against Black Dragón in a Lucha de Apuestas, mask vs. mask match, but Rayan fractured his foot in the week prior to the show. He chose Oficial Spector to replace him in the match, leading to Spector winning the match, forcing Black Dragón to unmask and state his given name, Jared Anciniega Lopez as per lucha libre traditions. In the semi-main event two generations of Los Villanos teamed up as Ray Mendoza Jr., Rokambole Jr., Villano IV, and Villano V Jr. defeated Mr. Electro, Sharly Rockstar, Trauma I, and Trauma II. The show included five additional matches.

== Production ==
=== Background ===
Promoter Adolfo Moreno had promoted Lucha Libre, or professional wrestling in Naucalpan, State of Mexico, Mexico prior to financing the building of Arena Naucalpan that opened in late 1976. Originally Moreno worked together with the Universal Wrestling Association (UWA) and then later Consejo Mundial de Lucha Libre (CMLL) as a local promoter. On January 1, 1996 Moreno created International Wrestling Revolution Group (IWRG) as an independent promotion. IWRG celebrates the anniversary of Arena Naucalpan each year in December with a major show, making it the second oldest, still promoted show series in the world. pre-dating WrestleMania by eight years. Only the CMLL Anniversary Show series has a longer history. The 2017 Arena Naucalpan anniversary show marked the 40th Anniversary of Arena Naucalpan. The Anniversary shows, as well as the majority of the IWRG shows in general are held in Arena Naucalpan.

=== Storylines ===
The Arena Naucalpan 40th Anniversary Show featured a total of five professional wrestling matches with different wrestlers involved in pre-existing scripted feuds, plots and storylines. Wrestlers portrayed themselves as either heels (referred to as rudos in Mexico, those that portray the "bad guys") or faces (técnicos in Mexico, the "good guy" characters) as they followed a series of tension-building events, which culminated in a wrestling match or series of matches.

== Event ==
La Dinastia Imperial ("The Imperiall Dynasty"; (brothers Ray Mendoza Jr. and Villano IV, and brothers Rokambole Jr. and Villano V Jr.) faced off against two sets of brothers in Mr. Electro and Sharly Rockstar (The Luna brothers) and Los Traumas (Trauma I and Trauma II) in an eight-man tag team match in the semi-main event of the show. Mr. Electro accidentally struck one of the Traumas, leading to La Dinastia Imperial scoring the deciding pinfall and victory. After the match the Luna brothers and Los Traumas argued about who was at fault for the loss, threatening each other.

The main event had been promoted as a Lucha de Apuestas, or bet match, where both Oficial Rayan and Black Dragón for their wrestling masks, but in the week leading up to the show Oficial Rayan fractured his foot and was unable to compete with his foot in a cast. IWRG announced that Oficial Rayan had to choose one of this tag team partners from Los Oficiales Elite, either Oficial Spector or Oficial Liderk, to take his place in the match. Rayan picked Oficial Spector, who had to risk his mask instead. With Rayan's help, Oficial Spector was able to defeat Black Dragón. After the match, Black Dragón unmasked, revealed that his real name was Jared Arciniega Lopez, from Mexico City and despite being only 18 years old had been a professional wrestler for four years at the time.

== Results ==
No.	Results	Stipulations
1	Ludark Shaitan defeated Fandango, Shadow Boy, Lili Dark, Demonio Infernal	Five-way match
2	Alas de Acero, Aramís, and Freelance defeated Leroy, Lunatic Xtreme, and Ovett	Six-man tag team match
3	Dr. Cerebro defeated Imposible	Singles match
4	Emperador Azteca and El Hijo del Alebrije defeated Indy Nation (Fly Warrior and Séptimo Rayo)	Six-man tag team match
5	Capo Del Norte, Capo Del Sur, and Máscara Año 2000 Jr. defeated Eterno, Heddi Karaoui, and Veneno	Six-man tag team match
6	La Dinastia Imperial (Ray Mendoza Jr., Rokambole Jr., Villano IV, and Villano V Jr.) defeated Mr. Electro, Sharly Rockstar, and Los Traumas (Trauma I and Trauma II)	Eight-man tag team match
7	Oficial Spector defeated Black Dragón	Lucha de Apuestas, mask vs. mask match
