= Festival de las Máscaras (2016) =

2016 International Wrestling Revolution Group event

- Official poster, depicting all eight main event competitors
- Promotion: International Wrestling Revolution Group
- Date: June 5, 2016 (aired June 6, 2016 (AYM Sports))
- City: Naucalpan, State of Mexico, Mexico
- Venue: Arena Naucalpan

Event chronology
← Previous; Guerra del Golfo	Next → Cabellera vs. Cabellera

IWRG Festival de las Máscaras chronology
← Previous; 2015	Next → 2017

The 2016 Festival de las Máscaras (Spanish for "Festival of the Masks") was a major lucha libre event produced and scripted by the Mexican International Wrestling Revolution Group (IWRG) professional wrestling promotion held on June 5, 2016. The show was held in Arena Naucalpan, Naucalpan, State of Mexico, which is IWRG's primary venue.

At the 2016 event Atomic Star, Panterita, Mega, Omega, Súper Mega Oficial 911, Oficial AK-47, Oficial Fierro and Veneno all wore their masks again after having lost Luchas de Apuestas, or "bet matches", in the past and thus lost the rights to wear their mask.

The main event was a three-stage steel cage match, in the steel first match Trauma I, Mr. Águila and Canis Lupus defeated Danny Casas and in the second steel cage match Máscara Año 2000 Jr., Mr. Elektro and El Hijo de Dos Caras defeated Toscano. This meant that Casas and Toscano were forced to compete in the final steel cage match of the night, under Lucha de Apuestas rules with both men risking their hair. In the end, Toscano pinned Danny Casas, forcing Casas to be shaved bald as a result.

== Production ==
=== Background ===
The wrestling mask has always held a sacred place in lucha libre, carrying with it a mystique and anonymity beyond what it means to wrestlers elsewhere in the world. The ultimate humiliation a luchador can suffer is to lose a Lucha de Apuestas, or bet match. Following a loss in a Lucha de Apuesta match the masked wrestler would be forced to unmask, state their real name and then would be unable to wear that mask while wrestling anywhere in Mexico. Since 2007 the Mexican wrestling promotion International Wrestling Revolution Group (IWRG; Sometimes referred to as Grupo Internacional Revolución in Spanish) has held a special annual show where they received a waiver to the rule from the State of Mexico Wrestling Commission and wrestlers would be allowed to wear the mask they previously lost in a Lucha de Apuestas.

The annual IWRG Festival de las Máscaras ("Festival of the Masks") event is also partly a celebration or homage of lucha libre history with IWRG honoring wrestlers of the past at the events similar to Consejo Mundial de Lucha Libre's (CMLL) Homenaje a Dos Leyendas ("Homage to Two Legends") annual shows. The IWRG's Festival de las Máscaras shows, as well as the majority of their major IWRG shows in general, are held in Arena Naucalpan, owned by the promoters of IWRG and is their main venue. The 2016 Festival de las Máscaras show was the ninth year in a row IWRG held the show. The 2016 show would be the first Festival de las Máscaras show to actually feature a Lucha de Apuestas match as well as the first Festival de las Máscaras to have a steel cage match main event.

Marco Antonio Soto Ceja, better known as Freelance began his career in the Mini-Estrella ("Mini-Star") division working as "Panterita" ("Little Panther"). Soto does not have dwarfism, but started wrestling at a young age and was very short when he made his debut so he was placed in the Mini-Estrellas division. On August 6, 2006 he lost a Lucha de Apuestas match to Cerebro Negro and had to unmask. At that point in time he abandoned the Panterita ring character and became known as "Freelance".

The trio known as Los Megas was created by the IWRG around the turn of the millennium as they took three of their regular wrestlers and turned them into the masked fan favorite team of Mega, Super Mega and Ultra Mega. Los Megas would win the Distrito Federal Trios Championship as well as the IWRG Intercontinental Tag Team Championship. On May 19, 2002 Super Mega was forced to unmask after he lost a match to Kung Fu Jr. Following his mask loss Super Mega left IWRG to work for Consejo Mundial de Lucha Libre (CMLL) as Último Vampiro instead. Super Mega was replaced with Omega to keep Los Megas a Trio. In 2003 IWRG introduced a group designed to be the "archenemy" of Los Megas in the form of Los Comandos (Comando Mega, Comando Gama and Comando Omega), who were dark and destructive to counter Los Megas' bright, kid-friendly personas. The groups developed their rivalry for the better part of a year, escalating the tension between the two groups. Los Comandos scored a major victory in the feud when Comando Gama defeated Omega in a Lucha de Apuesta. Omega removed his mask and subsequently was only used sporadically after that point. Mega was the last of the Los Megas trio to lose his mask as he lost a steel cage match in the main event of the 2004 El Castillo del Terror ("The Tower of Terror") and was forced to unmask.

In the spring of 2007 IWRG introduced a new version of Los Oficiales as they introduced a trio of masked "policemen". All three wrestlers had previously worked for IWRG under other names but were reintroduced as Oficial Fierro (Formerly Ultra Mega), Oficial 911 (formerly Comando Mega) and Oficial AK-47. Over the following years Los Oficiales developed into IWRG's top act, winning several team championships such as the Districto Federal Trios Championship, the IWRG Intercontinental Trios Championship and the IWRG Intercontinental Tag Team Championship. The first of the trio to lose his mask was Oficial AK-47, who lost a Lucha de Apuestas match to Trauma I on December 22, 2011. The following year, on November 1, 2012 Oficial Fierro lost the 2012 El Castillo del Terror match to El Ángel and was forced to unmask. Oficial 911 was forced to unmask when he and Mosco X-Fly lost a match to Golden Magic and El Hijo de Pirata Morgan on the Arena Naucalpan 36th Anniversary Show, hend on December 19, 2013.

Panamania wrestler Rafael Ernesto Medina Baeza started working as the masked character "Veneno" (Spanish for "Venom") in 2000 when he began to work for CMLL in Mexico. In CMLL he was part of Los Boricuas and through that association he was matched up against former Los Boricuas member Gran Markus Jr. in a long running storyline. The two met at the 2002 Homenaje a Dos Leyendas show where Gran Markus Jr. defeated Veneno, forcing him to unmask as a result.

=== Storylines ===
The event featured seven professional wrestling matches with different wrestlers involved in pre-existing scripted feuds, plots and storylines. Wrestlers were portrayed as either heels (referred to as rudos in Mexico, those that portray the "bad guys") or faces (técnicos in Mexico, the "good guy" characters) as they followed a series of tension-building events, which culminated in a wrestling match or series of matches.

Up until the Arena Naucalpan 38th Anniversary Show on December 20, 2015 Danny Casas and Toscano had teamed up on several occasions without any signs of issues between the two. At the Arena Naucalpa Anniversary Show Casas, Toscano, Tortuga Rafy and Veneno lost to the team of Máscara Año 2000 Jr., Negro Navarro, Pirata Morgan and Trauma II. After the loss Toscano blamed Danny Casas for the loss, pushing him out of the way as he left the ring. A week after the Anniversary show Toscano challenged Danny Casas to a singles match, which the veteran wrestler Toscano won by bending the rules. Following hs victory Toscano challenged Danny Casas to a Lucha de Apuestas, or "bet match", with both wrestlers putting their hair on the line at the IWRG 20th Anniversary Show. In the main event, Toscano played the rudo part throughout the match, although all three falls ended cleanly. In the end Danny Casas pinned Toscano to win the third and deciding fall. Afterwards Toscano had all his hair shaved off while in the middle of the ring. After the match Toscano shook Danny Casas' hand and walked off. The storyline between Casas and Toscano ended at the anniversary show, the two faced off during the preliminary round of the 2016 El Protector tournament but showed no signs of animosity.

== Event ==
During the event Milo Ventura Chávez, better known under the ring name Ultraman was honored by IWRG and the crowd as he accepted a plaque and then accompanied his son, Ultraman Jr. to the ring for the fourth match of the night.

During the first steel cage match rivals Trauma I and Canis Lups were the first two out of the cage, making Lucha de Apuestas challenges towards each other afterwards, both wanting the other to put their mask on the line. Mr. Águila clipped Danny Casas' knees and then climbed out of the cage, forcing Casas to wrestle later in the night. Mr. Elektro and El Hijo de Dos Caras were the first two wrestlers to escape the second cage match, leaving Toscano and Máscara Año 2000 Jr. in the cage. Máscara Año 2000 Jr. looked like he could not continue wrestling and actually told Toscano to just climb out of the cage. Instead, Toscano landed a low blow foul on Máscara Año 2000 Jr. and lost the match by disqualification. Toscano stated he did it to get revenge on Danny Casas for taking his hair almost six months prior. In the main event Toscano took advantage of Casas being hurt in the previous match and quickly defeated him. As a result of the match Casas had his hair shaved off moments before he was taken from the ring on a stretcher.

== Results ==
No.	Results	Stipulations
1	Aramis and Geo defeated Atomic Star and Enigma	Best two-out-of-three-falls tag team match
2	Los Tortugas Ninjas (Leo, Mike, Rafy and Teelo) defeated Dragón Fly, Panterita and Los Mariachis Loco (El Diablo Jr. and Imposible),	Best two-out-of-three-falls eight-man tag team match
3	Los Megas (Mega, Omega and Súper Mega) defeated Los Oficiales (Oficial 911, Oficial AK-47 and Oficial Fierro)	Best two-out-of-three-falls six-man tag team match
4	Pantera I, Pantera II and Ultraman Jr. defeated Argos, El Hijo del Diablo and Trauma II	Best two-out-of-three-falls six-man tag team match
5	Trauma I, Mr. Águila and Canis Lupus defeated Danny Casas	Steel cage match
6	Máscara Año 2000 Jr., Mr. Elektro and El Hijo de Dos Caras defeated Toscano	Steel cage match
7	Toscano defeated Danny Casas	Lucha de Apuestas Steel cage match, hair vs. hair
