= 55th Anniversary of Lucha Libre in Estado de México =

2017 International Wrestling Revolution Group event

55th Anniversary of Lucha Libre in Estadio de Mexico
- Official poster for the event
- Promotion: International Wrestling Revolution Group
- Date: December 3, 2017
- City: Naucalpan, State of Mexico
- Venue: Arena Naucalpan

Event chronology
← Previous; El Castillo del Terror	Next → Arena Naucalpan 40th Anniversary Show

Anniversary of Lucha Libre in Estado de México Shows chronology
← Previous; 54th Anniversary	Next → 56th Anniversary

The 55th Anniversary of Lucha Libre in Estadio de Mexico was celebrated by a professional wrestling supercard show produced and scripted by the Mexican lucha libre promotion International Wrestling Revolution Group (IWRG; sometimes referred to as Grupo Internacional Revolución in Mexico) which took place on December 3, 2017, in Arena Naucalpan, Naucalpan, State of Mexico (Estadio de Mexico). The event commemorated the sport of lucha libre becoming allowed in the State of Mexico, with the first lucha libre show held in the state taking place in December 1962. Over the years IWRG has on occasion celebrated the anniversary, although not consistently holding an anniversary show every year.

In the main event Ray Mendoza Jr. had come out of retirement to face Mr. Electro in a Lucha de Apuestas, bet match, with both competitors risking their hair on the outcome of the match. Mr Electro was disqualified in the third fall, causing him to lose the match and his hair as well. In the semi-main event Black Dragón and Oficial Rayan lost a Relevos Suicida match to the teams of Oficial Spector/Tortuga Teelo and Oficial Liderk/Tortuga Mike. As a result of the loss the two were scheduled to wrestle each other at the Arena Naucalpan 40th Anniversary Show on December 17, in a Lucha de Apuestas match for their masks. The show included five additional matches.

== Production ==
=== Background ===
The history of lucha libre, or professional wrestling in Mexico goes all the way back to the early 1900s where individual promoters would hold shows on a local basis in various Mexican states. In 1933 Salvador Lutteroth created Empresa Mexicana de Lucha Libre (EMLL; Spanish for "Mexican Wrestling Enterprise") and in subsequent years took EMLL to a national level. In the 1930s and 1940s various Mexican starts to create lucha libre commissions, often as an extension of the existing Boxing commissions, responsible for overview of lucha libre in each state, licensing wrestlers and ensuring the rules are being enforced. In the State of Mexico lucha libre was not officially sanctioned in late 1962, with the first lucha libre show in the State of Mexico held in December 1962.

The Mexican wrestling promotion International Wrestling Revolution Group (IWRG; Sometimes referred to as Grupo Internacional Revolución in Spanish) has on occasion held a major show in December to commemorate the "birth" of Lucha Libre in their home state. It is unclear exactly when IWRG started to mark the Anniversary, records confirm that they held a show to commemorate the event starting in 2010 commemorating the 48th Anniversary of Lucha Libre in Estadio de Mexico, possibly prior to that. The 2017 show was for the 55th anniversary and was held on December 3, 2013, in Arena Naucalpan, Naucalpan, State of Mexico where IWRG holds almost all of their major lucha libre shows.

=== Storylines ===
The 55th Anniversary of Lucha Libre in Estadio de Mexico event featured eight professional wrestling matches with different wrestlers involved in pre-existing scripted feuds, plots and storylines. Wrestlers were portrayed as either heels (referred to as rudos in Mexico, those that portray the "bad guys") or faces (técnicos in Mexico, the "good guy" characters) as they followed a series of tension-building events, which culminated in a wrestling match or series of matches.

== Event ==
After Dr. Cerebro pinned Imposible to win the match for his side (which included Alas de Acero and Bandido) he challenged Imposible to defend the IWRG Rey del Ring Championship at a later date. The fourth match of the night was part of a long-running IWRG vs. "Indy Nation" storyline where "Indy Nation" represented a number of wrestlers from the Independent circuit in Mexico, claiming they were better than the IWRG wrestlers. On the night "Indy Nation representatives Centvrión, Fly Warrior and Séptimo Rayo defeated IWRG representatives Diablo Jr., Dinamic Black and Emperador Azteca, all graduates of the IWRG wrestling school. In the closing moments of the match Fulgor I came to the ring and helped Indy Nation win the match. Afterwards, the group was joined by a masked man for their victory celebration. Moments later that masked man revealed himself to be Bandido, attacking Indy Nation. Afterwards Bandido declared that he, Emperador Azteca and Ciclon Ramirez was forming a trio to oppose Indy Nation. The fifth match of the night marked the first time Villano V's youngest son wrestled under the ring name Rokambole Jr., having previously competed as Kaving. Rokambole Jr, his brother Villano V Jr. and their uncle Villano IV lost to the team of Sharlie Rockstar and Los Traumas (Trauma I and Trauma II) after Sharly Rockstar hit Villano V Jr. with a foul while the referee was distracted.

The losing team in the semi-final Relevos Suicida match would be forced to put their masks on the line at the subsequent Arena Naucalpan 40th Anniversary Show scheduled for December 17. The teams for the match were Oficial Spector and Tortuga Teelo, Oficial Liderk and Tortuga Mike, Oficial Rayan and Black Dragón. While both members of Los Tortugas Ninja refused to wrestle against each other, opting to tag out instead, none of the Los Oficiales Elite members had such problems, wrestling each other to keep their mask safe. the Mike/Liderk team was the first team to score a pinfall and escape the match, followed by Teelo/Spector, which meant that Oficial Rayan and Black Dragón would risk their masks at a later date.

For the main event, the semi-retired Ray Mendoza Jr. was able to keep his hair due to a mistake by his opponent Mr. Electro. In the latter stages of the match Mr. Electro tried to his Mendoza Jr. with a steel chair, but accidentally ended up hitting the referee instead. This caused Mr. Electro to be disqualified, even after his brother, Sharly Rockstar, tried to argue that the match should continue. In the end, Mr. Electro reluctantly allowed for his hair to be shaved off.

== Results ==
No.	Results	Stipulations
1	Alas de Acero defeated Demonio Infernal, Skanda, Lunatic Xtreme, Kanon	Five-way match
2	La Maligna, Lili Dark, and Ludark Shaitan defeated Dulce Luna, Lady Cat, and Mary Caporal	Six-woman tag team match
3	Alas de Acero, Dr. Cerebro, and Bandido defeated Aramís, Freelance, and Imposible	Six-man tag team match
4	Indy Nation (Centvrión, Fly Warrior, and Séptimo Rayo) defeated Diablo Jr., Dinamic Black, and Emperador Azteca	Six-man tag team match
5	Sharly Rockstar and Los Traumas (Trauma I and Trauma II) defeated La Dinastia Imperial (Rokambole Jr., Villano IV, Villano V Jr.)	Six-man tag team match
6	Black Dragón and Oficial Rayan were defeated by Oficial Spector/Tortuga Teelo and Oficial Liderk/Tortuga Mike	Three-way tag team Relevos Suicida match
7	Ray Mendoza Jr. defeated Mr. Electro by disqualification	Best two-out-of-three falls Lucha de Apuestas, hair vs. hair match

== See also ==
- 2017 in professional wrestling
- Professional wrestling in Mexico
