= IWRG 20th Anniversary Show =

2016 International Wrestling Revolution Group event

- Official poster for the event with Danny Casas and Toscano
- Promotion: International Wrestling Revolution Group
- Date: January 3, 2016
- City: Naucalpan, State of Mexico
- Venue: Arena Naucalpan

Event chronology
← Previous; Arena Naucalpan 38th Anniversary Show	Next → El Protector

IWRG Anniversary Shows chronology
← Previous; 19th Anniversary	Next → 21st Anniversary

The IWRG 20th Anniversary Show was a major lucha libre event produced and scripted by the Mexican International Wrestling Revolution Group (IWRG) professional wrestling promotion on January 3, 2016. The show was held in Arena Naucalpan, Naucalpan, State of Mexico, which is IWRG's primary venue. As the name indicates the event commemorates the anniversary of IWRG, which was founded on January 1, 1996.

The main event of the IWRG 20th Anniversary Show was a Lucha de Apuestas, or "bet match" where both Toscano and Danny Casas put their hair on the line. Toscano lost the match and as a result had all his hair shaved off afterwards. The show included four additional matches. The last four matches of the show were televised as part of IWRG's Zona XXI (Zone 21) weekly television show on AYM Sports

== Production ==
=== Background ===
Wrestler-turned-promoter Adolfo "Pirata" Moreno began promoting wrestling shows in his native Naucalpan de Juárez, Mexico, bringing in wrestlers from Empresa Mexicana de Lucha Libre (EMLL) to Naucalpan as well as featuring wrestlers from the Mexican independent circuit. Later on he would promote shows mainly in "Arena KO Al Gusto" and served as the Universal Wrestling Association (UWA) partner, using the name Promociones Moreno as the business name for his promotional efforts. In 1977 Moreno bought the run down Arena KO Al Gusto and had Arena Naucalpan built in its place, an arena designed specifically for wrestling shows, with a maximum capacity of 2,400 spectators for the shows. Arena Naucalpan became the permanent home for Promociones Moreno, with very few shows held elsewhere.

In late 1995 Adolfo Moreno decided to create his own promotion, creating a regular roster instead of relying totally on wrestlers from other promotions, creating the International Wrestling Revolution Group (IWRG; sometimes referred to as Grupo Internacional Revolución in Spanish) on January 1, 1996. From that point on Arena Naucalpan became the main venue for IWRG, hosting the majority of their weekly shows and all of their major shows as well. The first IWRG Anniversary Show was held on January 1, 1997 with all subsequent shows being held on or right after January 1 each year, all at Arena Naucalpan.

=== Storylines ===
The event featured five professional wrestling matches with different wrestlers involved in pre-existing scripted feuds, plots and storylines. Wrestlers were portrayed as either heels (referred to as rudos in Mexico, those that portray the "bad guys") or faces (técnicos in Mexico, the "good guy" characters) as they followed a series of tension-building events, which culminated in a wrestling match or series of matches.

Up until the Arena Naucalpan 38th Anniversary Show on December 20, 2015 Danny Casas and Toscano had teamed up on several occasions without any signs of issues between the two. At the Arena Naucalpa Anniversary Show Casas, Toscano, Tortuga Rafy and Veneno lost to the team of Máscara Año 2000 Jr., Negro Navarro, Pirata Morgan and Trauma II. After the loss Toscano blamed Danny Casas for the loss, pushing him out of the way as he left the ring. A week after the Anniversary show Toscano challenged Danny Casas to a singles match, which the veteran wrestler Toscano won by bending the rules. Following hs victory Toscano challenged Danny Casas to a Lucha de Apuestas, or "bet match", with both wrestlers putting their hair on the line.

== Event ==
The first match of the show, a tag team match where Aramis and Black Dragon defeated Adrenalina and Atomic Star was the only match on the show not taped for IWRG's weekly Zona XXI television show on AYM Sports. During the second match the rudo team of Hip Hop Man, Imposible and Tony Rivera stone the decorative turtle shells that Los Tortugas Ninjas usually wears, putting the on to mock their opponents during the match.

The third match of the night marked the first time Pantera I, Pantera II and El Hijo del Pantera (Son of Pantera II) teamed up as a trio, Los Panteras defeated the rudo trio known as Los Insportables ("The Insupportables"; Canis Lupus, Apolo Estrada Jr. and Eterno), two falls to one. Crazy Boy was originally announced for the fourth match of the night, set to team with Herodes Jr. and Super Nova, but was replaced by Black Terry. On the opposing side IWRG brought back Demon Clown, a 326 lb (148 kg) masked wrestler who last worked for IWRG in 2014. Demon Clown and Los Traumas (Trauma I and Trauma II) won the match when Demon Clown hit Herodes Jr. with a metal chain, knocking him out to win the match. After the loss Herodes Jr. challenged Demon Clown to a singles match.

In the main event Toscano played the rudo part throughout the match, although all three falls ended cleanly. In the end Danny Casas pinned Toscano to win the third and deciding fall. Afterwards Toscano had all his hair shaved off while in the middle of the ring. Afterwards he shook Danny Casas' hand and walked off.

== Aftermath ==
Herodes Jr. and Demon Clown would face off in a six-man tag team match the following week, but beyond that they did not interact. Instead Herodes entered in a three-way feud with El Hijo de Dos Caras, holder of the IWRG Intercontinental Heavyweight Championship, and Trauma II.

The storyline between Casas and Toscano ended at the anniversary show, the two faced off during the preliminary round of the 2016 El Protector tournament but showed no signs of animosity at the time. At the 2016 Festival de las Máscaras show Toscano and Danny Casas once again faced off in a Lucha de Apuestas match, this time in a steel cage match, with Toscano pinning Casas. As a result, Casas was forced to have his hair shaved off, reversing the results of the 20th anniversary show.

== Results ==
No.	Results	Stipulations
1^{D}	Aramis and Black Dragon defeated Adrenalina and Atomic Star	Best two-out-of-three-falls tag team match
2	Hip Hop Man, Imposible and Tony Rivera defeated Los Tortugas Ninjas (Leo, Mike and Rafy)	Best two-out-of-three falls six-man tag team match
3	Los Panteras (El Hijo del Pantera, El Pantera I and El Pantera II) defeated Los Insportables (Canis Lupus, Apolo Estrada Jr. and Eterno)	Best two-out-of-three falls six-man tag team match
4	Demon Clown and Los Traumas (Trauma I and Trauma II) defeated Black Terry, Herodes Jr. and Super Nova	Best two-out-of-three falls six-man tag team match
5	Danny Casas defeated Toscano – two falls to one	Best two-out-of-three-falls Lucha de Apuestas, hair vs. hair match.
D / – this was a dark match
