= 57th Anniversary of Lucha Libre in Estado de México =

2018 International Wrestling Revolution Group event

57th Anniversary of Lucha Libre in Estadio de Mexico
- Promotion: International Wrestling Revolution Group
- Date: December 15, 2019
- City: Naucalpan, State of Mexico
- Venue: Arena Naucalpan

Event chronology
← Previous; PALL 1st Anniversary Show	Next → La Ruleta de la Muerte

Anniversary of Lucha Libre in Estado de México Shows chronology
← Previous; 56th Anniversary	Next → —

The 57th Anniversary of Lucha Libre in Estadio de Mexico (Spanish: 57. Aniversario de la Lucha Libre en el Estadio de México) was celebrated by a professional wrestling supercard show produced and scripted by the Mexican lucha libre promotion International Wrestling Revolution Group (IWRG; sometimes referred to as Grupo Internacional Revolución in Mexico) which tookplace on December 15, 2019 in Arena Naucalpan, Naucalpan, State of Mexico. The event commemorated the sport of lucha libre becoming allowed in the State of Mexico, with the first lucha libre show held in the state taking place in December 1962. Over the years IWRG has on occasion celebrated the anniversary, although not consistently holding an anniversary show every year.

The event, also billed as La Revolución 57, saw L.A. Park defeat Blue Demon Jr. in the main event of the night. In the semi-main event, lucha libre veteran El Canek defeated Rayo de Jalisco Jr., and Máscara Sagrada. In the fifth match of the night, the sons of L.A. Park (El Hijo de L.A. Park and L.A. Park Jr.) defeated the fraternal teams of Las Traumas (Trauma I and Trauma II) and El Hijo de Canis Lupus/Dragón Bane. The show featured four additional matches.

== Production ==
=== Background ===
The history of lucha libre, or professional wrestling in Mexico goes all the way back to the early 1900s where individual promoters would hold shows on a local basis in various Mexican states. In 1933 Salvador Lutteroth created Empresa Mexicana de Lucha Libre (EMLL; Spanish for "Mexican Wrestling Enterprise") and in subsequent years took EMLL to a national level. In the 1930s and 1940s various Mexican starts to create lucha libre commissions, often as an extension of the existing Boxing commissions, responsible for overview of lucha libre in each state, licensing wrestlers and ensuring the rules are being enforced. In the State of Mexico lucha libre was not officially sanctioned in late 1962, with the first sanctioned lucha libre show in the State of Mexico being held in December of that year.

The Mexican wrestling promotion International Wrestling Revolution Group (IWRG; Sometimes referred to as Grupo Internacional Revolución in Spanish) has on occasion held a major show in December to commemorate the "birth" of Lucha Libre in their home state. It is unclear exactly when IWRG started to mark the Anniversary, records confirm that they held a show to commemorate the event starting in 2010 commemorating the 48th Anniversary of Lucha Libre in Estadio de Mexico, possibly prior to that. The 2019 show will be the 57th anniversary and will be held on December XX, 2019 in Arena Naucalpan, Naucalpan, State of Mexico where IWRG holds all of their major lucha libre shows.

=== Storylines ===
The 57th Anniversary of Lucha Libre in Estadio de Mexico show featured seven professional wrestling matches with different wrestlers involved in pre-existing scripted feuds, plots and storylines. Wrestlers were portrayed as either heels (referred to as rudos in Mexico, those that portray the "bad guys") or faces (técnicos in Mexico, the "good guy" characters) as they followed a series of tension-building events, which culminated in a wrestling match or series of matches.

== Matches ==
No.	Results	Stipulations
1	Puma de Oro and Legendario defeated Kamikaze and Dick Angelo 3G	Best two-out-of-three falls tag team match
2	Alas de Oro and Alas de Plata defeated Fulgor I and Avisman	Best two-out-of-three falls tag team match
3	Toxin and Los Oficiales (Oficial AK-47 and Oficial Fierro) defeated Pasion Kristal, Soy Raymunda, and Jessy Ventura by disqualification	Best two-out-of-three falls six-man tag team match
4	Los Big Strippers (Big Mike, Big Ovett, and Big Chico Che) defeated Fresero Jr., Capo del Norte, and Capo del Sur	Best two-out-of-three falls six-man tag team match
5	El Hijo de L.A. Park and L.A. Park Jr. defeated Las Traumas (Trauma I and Trauma II) and El Hijo de Canis Lupus/Dragón Bane	Three-way tag team match
6	El Canek defeated Rayo de Jalisco Jr. and Máscara Sagrada	Three-way match
7	L.A. Park defeated Blue Demon Jr.	Singles match

== See also ==
- 2019 in professional wrestling
- Professional wrestling in Mexico
