= Anniversary of Lucha Libre in Estado de México Shows =

- Created by: Adolfo Moreno
- Promotions: International Wrestling Revolution Group
- Other names: Arena Naucalpan Anniversary Show (Note: Both anniversaries have been celebrated on joint events in the past)
- First event: December 1963
- Last event: 57th Anniversary
- Event gimmick: Commemorating the anniversary of the Moreno family promoting wrestling in the State of Mexico
- Signature matches: Lucha de Apuestas, "mask vs. mask" or "hair vs. hair" match

The Anniversary of Lucha Libre in Estado de México Shows is an annual professional wrestling supercard event, scripted and promoted by the Naucalpan, State of Mexico based International Wrestling Revolution Group (IWRG) professional wrestling promotion. The show commemorates the first wrestling show promoted by Adolfo "Pirata" Moreno in the State of Mexico (Estado de México) in December 1962. The show was first held in Arena K.O. Al Gusto and later in Arena Naucalpan built in the location of Arena K.O. Al Gusto some years the show has been combined with shows that commemorate the opening of Arena Naucalpan in December 1977. The earliest confirmed anniversary show took place in 2002, for the 40th anniversary. At times IWRG has promoted one of their annual shows as part of the anniversary celebration, such as the Rey del Ring or Prisión Fatal.

The most recent show celebrated the 56th Anniversary held on December 2, 2018. The anniversary shows normally features a Lucha de Apuestas ("Bet match") where two or more wrestlers "bet" their wrestling mask or their hair on the outcome of the match.

== History ==
The building at Calle Jardín 19, Naucalpan Centro, 53000 Naucalpan de Juárez, México, Mexico was originally an indoor roller rink for the locals in the late part of the 1950s, known as Cafe Algusto. By the early-1960s the building was sold and turned into "Arena KO Al Gusto" and became a local lucha libre or professional wrestling arena, with a ring permanently set up in the center of the building, holding shows on a regular basis promoted by Adolfo "Pirata" Moreno. The earliest match reports from Arena KO Al Gusto are dated December 12, 1962 with a main event battle royal that featured wrestler-turned-promoter Adolfo Moreno as one of the participants. Promoter Adolfo Moreno began holding shows on a regular basis often, working with other Mexican promotions such as Empresa Mexicana de Lucha Libre (EMLL) or the Universal Wrestling Association (UWA) to bring lucha libre to Naucalpan. In December 1977, Arena Naucalpan was built on the site of Arena K.O. Al Gusto and as the venue of Moreno's shows, including anniversary shows held to commemorate the first show in 1962.

Moreno's promotion, later turned into International Wrestling Revolution Group, usually held at least one major show in December, both to celebrate the anniversary of the promotion as well as the opening of Arena Naucalpan in December 1977 featuring high-profile matches, such as various Lucha de Apuestas ("Bet matches") where wrestlers would risk their wrestling mask or hair on the outcome of the match. In Lucha libre the wrestling mask holds a sacred place, with the most anticipated and prestigious matches being those where a wrestler's mask is on the line, a so-called Lucha de Apuestas, or "bet match" where the loser would be forced to unmask in the middle of the ring and state their birth name. Winning a mask is considered a bigger accomplishment in lucha libre than winning a professional wrestling championship and usually draws more people and press coverage. Losing a mask is often a watershed moment in a wrestler's career, they give up the mystique and prestige of being an enmascarado (masked wrestler) but usually come with a higher than usual payment from the promoter.

Anniversary Lucha de Apuestas losses

Year	Loser	Bet	Winner	Ref(s)
1995 (Note: This was part of an Arena Naucalpan Anniversary show, which may have doubled as the promotion's anniversary show as well.)	Sable	mask	Kraneo	
2000	Oficial	hair	Último Vampiro	
2001	El Enterrador	mask	Último Vampiro	
2002	Villano III	Hair	Uncertain	
2003	Cerebro Negro	Hair	Avisman	
2004	Gigoló American	Hair	Dr. Cerebro	
2005	Cyborg	Hair	Bestia Salvaje	
2006	Oficial	Hair	Xibalba	
2009	Bushi	Mask	Oficial 911	
2012	Oficial Factor	Mask	Oficial 911	
2013	Oficial AK-47	Hair	Apolo Estrada Jr.	
2014	Veneno	Hair	Toscano	
2017	Mr. Electro	Hair	Rey Mendoza Jr.	

== Events ==
Event	Date	Main Event	Ref(s)
1st	December 1963	N/A (Note: No records have been found labelling a December show as a special "Anniversary" show.)	
2nd	December 1964	N/A	
3rd	December 1965	N/A	
4th	December 1966	N/A	
5th	December 1967	N/A	
6th	December 1968	N/A	
7th	December 1969	N/A	
8th	December 1970	N/A	
9th	December 1971	N/A	
10th	December 1972	N/A	
11th	December 1973	N/A	
12th	December 1974	N/A	
13th	December 1975	N/A	
14th	December 1976	N/A	
15th	December 1977	Possibly combined with the Arena Naucalpan debut show	
16th	December 1978	Possibly combined with the Arena Naucalpan 1st Anniversary Show	
17th	December 1979	Possibly combined with the Arena Naucalpan 2nd Anniversary Show	
18th	December 1980	Possibly combined with the Arena Naucalpan 3rd Anniversary Show	
19th	December 1981	Possibly combined with the Arena Naucalpan 4th Anniversary Show	
20th	December 1982	Possibly joint with the Arena Naucalpan 5th Anniversary Show	
21st	December 1983	Possibly combined with the Arena Naucalpan 6th Anniversary Show	
22nd	December 1984	Possibly combined with the Arena Naucalpan 7th Anniversary Show	
23rd	December 1985	Possibly combined with the Arena Naucalpan 8th Anniversary Show	
24th	December 1986	Possibly combined with the Arena Naucalpan 9th Anniversary Show	
25th	December 1987	Possibly combined with the Arena Naucalpan 10th Anniversary Show	
26th	December 1988	Possibly combined with the Arena Naucalpan 11th Anniversary Show	
27th	December 1989	Possibly combined with the Arena Naucalpan 12th Anniversary Show	
28th	December 1990	Possibly combined with the Arena Naucalpan 13th Anniversary Show	
29th	December 1991	Possibly combined with the Arena Naucalpan 14th Anniversary Show	
30th	December 1992	Bestia Salvaje vs. El Dandy for the CMLL World Middleweight Championship	
31st	December 1993	Possibly combined with the Arena Naucalpan 16th Anniversary Show	
32nd	December 1994	Possibly combined with the Arena Naucalpan 17th Anniversary Show	
33rd	December 1995	Possibly combined with the Arena Naucalpan 18th Anniversary Show	
34th	December 1996	Possibly combined with the Arena Naucalpan 19th Anniversary Show	
35th	December 1997	Possibly combined with the Arena Naucalpan 20th Anniversary Show	
36th	December 1998	Possibly combined with the Arena Naucalpan 21st Anniversary Show	
37th	December 1999	Possibly combined with the Arena Naucalpan 22nd Anniversary Show	
38th	December 2000	Possibly combined with the Arena Naucalpan 23rd Anniversary Show	
39th	December 2001	Possibly combined with the Arena Naucalpan 24th Anniversary Show	
40th	December 5, 2002	Brazo de Oro vs. Brazo de Plata vs. El Engendro vs. El Hijo del Diablo vs. Pentagón Black vs. Super Parka vs. Villano IV vs. Villano III in a Domo de la Muerte match	
41st	December 1, 2003	Possibly combined with the Arena Naucalpan 26th Anniversary Show	
42nd	December 9, 2004	Dr. Cerebro vs. Gigoló American in a Lucha de Apuestas hair vs. hair match	
43rd	December 11, 2005	Bestia Salvaje vs. Cyborg in a Lucha de Apuestas hair vs. hair match	
44th	December 17, 2006	Xibalba vs. Oficial in a Lucha de Apuestas hair vs. hair match	
45th	December 2007	Possibly combined with the Arena Naucalpan 30th Anniversary Show	
46th	December 7, 2008	Fuerza Guerrera, Super Astro, Tinieblas Jr., and Zumbido vs. Head Hunter A, Masada, Máscara Año 2000, and Tetsuya	
47th	December 3, 2009	Oficial 911 vs. Bushi in a Lucha de Apuestas, mask vs. mask match	
48th	December 5, 2010	Crazy Boy, Fuerza Guerrera, and Veneno vs. Cerebro Negro, Dr. Cerebro, and El Hijo de Aníbal	
49th	December 4, 2011	El Canek, La Braza, Headhunter A, and Negro Navarro vs. El Texano Jr., Lizmark Jr., Rayman, and Rayo de Jalisco Jr.	
50th	December 2, 2012	Factor vs. El Hijo de Pirata Morgan vs. El Hijo de Máscara Año 2000 vs. Oficial 911 in a Lucha de Apuestas steel cage match	
51st	December 1, 2013	Oficial AK-47 vs. El Hijo de Pirata Morgan vs. Apolo Estrada Jr. vs. X-Fly in a Lucha de Apuestas, hair vs. hair match	
52nd	December 7, 2014	Toscano vs. El Veneno in a Luchas de Apuestas match	
53rd	December 16, 2015	La Familia de Tijuana (Damián 666, Halloween, and X-Fly) vs. Argos, Crazy Boy, and Danny Casas	
54th	December 11, 2016	30-man 2016 Rey del Ring match	
55th	December 3, 2017	Ray Mendoza Jr. vs. Mr. Electro in a Lucha de Apuestas, hair vs. hair match	
56th	December 2, 2018	Capo Del Norte, Capo Del Sur, and Máscara Año 2000 Jr. vs. Rokambole Jr., Villano IV, and Villano V Jr.	
57th	December 15, 2019	TBD	
