= Festival de las Máscaras (2019) =

Mexican professional wrestling show

- Official poster for the event showing including a homage to Vampiro
- Date: June 26, 2019
- City: Naucalpan, State of Mexico
- Venue: Arena Naucalpan

Event chronology
← Previous; Rey del Ring	Next → La Jaula de Las Locas

Festival de las Máscaras chronology
← Previous; 2018	Next → —

The Festival de las Máscaras (2019) (Spanish for "Festival of the Masks") was a major annual lucha libre event produced and scripted by the Mexican International Wrestling Revolution Group (IWRG) professional wrestling promotion held on June 26, 2019. The show was held in Arena Naucalpan, Naucalpan, State of Mexico, which is IWRG's primary venue. For the 2019 event Bombero Infernal, Cerebro Negro, Cocolores, Coco Verde, Oficial 911, Oficial AK-47, and Oficial Fierro all wore their masks again after having lost Luchas de Apuestas, or "bet matches", in the past and thus lost the rights to wear their mask. The 2019 event also homage to Vampiro and his long career.

In the main event IWRG mainstays Dragon Bane and El Hijo de Canis Lupus teamed up with Consejo Mundial de Lucha Libre (CMLL) representative Negro Casas to defeat IWRG regulars Los Traumas (Trauma I and Trauma II) and CMLL representative Hechicero. In the semi-main event CMLL visitors La Nueva Generación Dinamita (El Cuatrero, Forastero and Sansón) defeated Capo del Norte, Capo del Sur, and Mascara Ano 2000 Jr. by disqualification. The show included five additional matches.

== Production ==
=== Background ===
The wrestling mask has always held a sacred place in lucha libre, carrying with it a mystique and anonymity beyond what it means to wrestlers elsewhere in the world. The ultimate humiliation a luchador can suffer is to lose a Lucha de Apuestas, or bet match. Following a loss in a Lucha de Apuesta match the masked wrestler would be forced to unmask, state their real name and then would be unable to wear that mask while wrestling anywhere in Mexico. Since 2007 the Mexican wrestling promotion International Wrestling Revolution Group (IWRG; Sometimes referred to as Grupo Internacional Revolución in Spanish) has held a special annual show where they received a waiver to the rule from the State of Mexico Wrestling Commission and wrestlers would be allowed to wear the mask they previously lost in a Lucha de Apuestas.

The annual IWRG Festival de las Máscaras ("Festival of the Masks") event is also partly a celebration or homage of lucha libre history with IWRG honoring wrestlers of the past at the events similar to Consejo Mundial de Lucha Libre's (CMLL) Homenaje a Dos Leyendas ("Homage to Two Legends") annual shows. The IWRG's Festival de las Máscaras shows, as well as the majority of their major IWRG shows in general, are held in Arena Naucalpan, owned by the promoters of IWRG and is their main venue. The 2019 Festival de las Máscaras show was the 12th year in a row IWRG held the show.

=== Storylines ===
The event featured seven professional wrestling matches with different wrestlers involved in pre-existing scripted feuds, plots and storylines. Wrestlers were portrayed as either heels (referred to as rudos in Mexico, those that portray the "bad guys") or faces (técnicos in Mexico, the "good guy" characters) as they followed a series of tension-building events, which culminated in a wrestling match or series of matches.

Previously unmasked wrestlers

Name	Lost mask to	Date	Ref
Bombero Infernal	El Pantera	December 7, 1997	
Cerebro Negro	Masada	November 3, 2005	
Cocolores and Coco Verde	Super Muñeco and Axel	December 12, 2009	
Oficial 911	Golden Magic and El Hijo de Pirata Morgan	December 19, 2013	
Oficial AK-47	Trauma I	December 22, 2011	
Oficial Fierro	El Ángel	November 1, 2012	

== Aftermath ==
One of the storylines from the main event centered around IWRG Intercontinental Heavyweight Champion El Hijo de Canis Lupus and Hechicero who appeared as part of a collaboration with Consejo Mundial de Lucha Libre. Hechicero defeated El Hijo de Canis Lupus on August 4, 2019, and afterwards made a championship challenge. The following month El Hijo de Canis Lupus retained his championship against Hechicero, defeating the CMLL challenger by disqualification.

== Results ==
No.	Results	Stipulations
1	Fulgor I and Fulgor II defeated Iron Kid and Principe Aereo	Tag team match
2	Los Oficiales (Oficial 911, Oficial AK-47, and Oficial Fierro) defeated Jessy Ventura, Oscar El Hermoso, and Soy Raymunda	Six-man tag team match
3	Black Terry, Bombero Infernal, and Sangre Azteca defeated Los Payasos (Cocolores, Coco Rojo, and Coco Verde)	Six-man tag team match
4	Aramís defeated Demonio Infernal	Singles match
5	Aramís, Atomic Star, and El Pantera II defeated Cerebro Negro, El Hijo del Medico Asesino, and Fly Warrior	Six-man tag team match
6	La Nueva Generación Dinamita (El Cuatrero, Forastero and Sansón) defeated Capo del Norte, Capo del Sur, and Mascara Ano 2000 Jr. by disqualification	Six-man tag team match
7	Dragon Bane, El Hijo de Canis Lupus, and Negro Casas defeated Los Traumas (Trauma I and Trauma II) and Hechicero	Six-man tag team match
