= Triangular en Jaula =

2018 International Wrestling Revolution Group event

- Official poster for the event
- Date: November 15, 2018
- City: Naucalpan, State of Mexico
- Venue: Arena Naucalpan

Event chronology
← Previous; El Castillo del Terror	Next → 56th Anniversary of Lucha Libre in Estado de México

The Triangular en Jaula (Spanish for "Triangle in the Cage") show is a major lucha libre event produced and scripted by Mexican professional wrestling promotion International Wrestling Revolution Group (IWRG), that took place on November 15, 2018 in Arena Naucalpan, Naucalpan, State of Mexico, Mexico. The show was sponsored by Flufenax and the six top matches were shown live on the +LuchaTV YouTube channel.

The main event of the show was a three-way steel cage match, which also inspired the title of the event. The match saw Rush defeat long time rival L.A. Park and Penta 0M, as a result L.A. Park and Penta 0M will face off at the Arena Naucalpan 41st Anniversary Show. On the undercard of the show El Cl4n (Charly Rockstar, Ciber the Main Man and The Chris) and Cuervo de Puerto Rico defeated El Hijo de LA Park, Lizmark Jr., Mr. Electro, and Sinn Bodhi, after the match Ciber the Main Man challenged Mr. Electro for the IWRG Intercontinental Heavyweight Championship. The show included six additional matches.

== Event ==
The Triangular en Jaula event featured eight professional wrestling matches with different wrestlers involved in pre-existing scripted feuds, plots and storylines. Wrestlers were portrayed as either heels (referred to as rudos in Mexico, those that portray the "bad guys") or faces (técnicos in Mexico, the "good guy" characters) as they followed a series of tension-building events, which culminated in a wrestling match or series of matches.

The first two matches of the night were held before the video feed went live on the+Lucha channel. The first match of the night was not advertised ahead of time, and saw Emperador Billiante defeat Blue Monsther in a singles match. The second dark match was originally advertised as the third match of the show, but was moved down for unexplained reasons. In the second match of the night Francoise Montañez defeated Dr. Cerebro, after which Dr. Cerebro challenged Montañez to put his wrestling mask on the line at a future date.

The first match shown on the live stream was originally advertised as El Solar taking on a Mixed martial arts fighter, but instead El Solar teamed up with his son, El Hijo del Solar, defeating El Hijo del Fishman and Negro Navarro in a tag team match. The fourth match of the night pitted Los Traumas (Trauma I and Trauma II), mainstays in both IWRG and on the Mexican independent circuit, against Blue Panther Jr. and The Panther, a brother team that works primarily in Consejo Mundial de Lucha Libre (CMLL). The Panther brothers defeated Los Traumas and made challenges for a future match between the two.

The fifth match of the night featured Jack Evans, who primarily works for Lucha Libre AAA Worldwide in Mexico and Ricky Marvin, a lucha libre veteran who has worked all over Mexico and Japan in his career. Evans defeated Ricky Marvin in what was reportedly a great match. The sixth match was billed as "Lucha vs. MMA" as luchadors Heddi Karaoui and Zumbi took on, and lost to brothers Jean and Pierre Montañez, older brothers of Fancoise Montañez who wrestled earlier in the night. The Montañez defeated Karaoui and Zumbi as the French visitors showed their dominance in the ring.

In the semi-main event IWRG had originally announced that Silver King would return to IWRG and wrestle as "Ramsés", the role he portrayed in the Nacho Libre movie. On the night Sinn Bodhi replaced Silver King to team up with IWRG Intercontinental Heavyweight Champion Mr. Electro, Lizmark Jr. and El Hijo de L.A. Park. The four faced off against El Cl4n (Charly Rockstar, Ciber the Main Man and The Chris) and Cuervo de Puerto Rico in an eight-man tag team match. In the closing moments of the match Ciber the Main Man pinned Mr. Electro, positioning himself as the challenger for Mr. Electro's championship.

Prior to the main event steel cage match, IWRG officials explained that the first wrestler to escape the cage would be declared the winner of the match and that the two losing wrestlers would face off on December 21, 2018 at the Arena Naucalpan 41st Anniversary Show. The main event marked CMLL regular Rush's return to IWRG, last seen in June 2018 at the annual Festival de las Máscaras even where he and his brother Dragon Lee took on one of Rush's opponents of the night, L.A. Park and his son El Hijo de L.A. Park. The two were joined in the steel cage by Penta 0M before the door was locked. None of the wrestlers were allowed to leave the cage for the first either minutes of the match, leading to all three wrestlers fighting each other without trying to escape the cage. After a couple of minutes of wrestling officials opened the cage door to allow wooden tables, steel chairs, a ladder and even a lamp to be brought into the ring for the wrestlers to use on each other. During the match Rush tore Penta 0M's mask open, exposing part of his face. At one point Penta 0M tried to throw Rush into the lamp, only for Rush to reverse the move, then use the fact that Penta 0M was temporarily incapacitated to climb up the side of the cage and over the top to win the match. As a result of the match L.A. Park and Penta 0M were scheduled to face off in the main event of the Arena Naucalpan 41st Anniversary Show.

== Results ==
No.	Results	Stipulations
1^{D}	Emperador Brillante defeated Blue Monsther	Singles match
2^{D}	Francoise Montañez defeated Dr. Cerebro	Singles match
3	Hijo del Solar and El Solar defeated Hijo del Fishman and Negro Navarro	Tag team match
4	Blue Panther Jr. and The Panther defeated Los Traumas (Trauma I and Trauma II)	Tag team match
5	Jack Evans defeated Ricky Marvin	Singles match
6	Jean Montañez and Pierre Montañez defeated Heddi Karaoui and Zumbi	Tag team match
7	El Cl4n (Charly Rockstar, Ciber the Main Man and The Chris) and Cuervo de Puerto Rico defeated El Hijo de LA Park, Lizmark Jr., Mr. Electro, and Sinn Bodhi	Eight-man tag team match
8	Rush defeated L.A. Park and Penta 0M	Steel cage match
D / – this was a dark match
