= 56th Anniversary of Lucha Libre in Estado de México =

2018 International Wrestling Revolution Group event

56th Anniversary of Lucha Libre in Estadio de Mexico
- Official poster for the event
- Promotion: International Wrestling Revolution Group
- Date: December 2, 2018
- City: Naucalpan, State of Mexico
- Venue: Arena Naucalpan

Event chronology
← Previous; Triangular en Jaula	Next → Arena Naucalpan 41st Anniversary Show

Anniversary of Lucha Libre in Estado de México Shows chronology
← Previous; 55th Anniversary	Next → 57th Anniversary

The 56th Anniversary of Lucha Libre in Estadio de Mexico (Spanish: 56 Aniversario de la Lucha Libre en el Estadio de México) was celebrated by a professional wrestling supercard show produced and scripted by the Mexican lucha libre promotion International Wrestling Revolution Group (IWRG; sometimes referred to as Grupo Internacional Revolución in Mexico) which took place on December 3, 2018 in Arena Naucalpan, Naucalpan, State of Mexico (Estadio de Mexico). The event commemorated the sport of lucha libre becoming allowed in the State of Mexico, with the first lucha libre show held in the state taking place in December 1962. Over the years IWRG has on occasion celebrated the anniversary, although not consistently holding an anniversary show every year.

In the main event the trio of Máscara Año 2000 Jr., Capo del Norte, and Capo del Sur defeated La Dinastia Imperial ("The Imperial Dynasty"; Rokambole Jr., Villano IV, and Villano V Jr.) by disqualification when Toscano attacked Máscara Año 2000 Jr. during the match. In the semi-main event Aramís lost to Freelance and Alas de Acero in a match where each wrestler represented a referee. As a result of Aramis' loss referee Reyes Rosas had his hair shaved off as a result. In the fifth match the team of Black Terry, Dr. Cerebro, Imposible, Ovett, Toscano, and Último Gladiador won the Copa Higher Power. The show featured four additional matches

== Production ==
=== Background ===
The history of lucha libre, or professional wrestling in Mexico goes all the way back to the early 1900s where individual promoters would hold shows on a local basis in various Mexican states. In 1933 Salvador Lutteroth created Empresa Mexicana de Lucha Libre (EMLL; Spanish for "Mexican Wrestling Enterprise") and in subsequent years took EMLL to a national level. In the 1930s and 1940s various Mexican starts to create lucha libre commissions, often as an extension of the existing Boxing commissions, responsible for overview of lucha libre in each state, licensing wrestlers and ensuring the rules are being enforced. In the State of Mexico lucha libre was not officially sanctioned in late 1962, with the first sanctioned lucha libre show in the State of Mexico being held in December of that year.

The Mexican wrestling promotion International Wrestling Revolution Group (IWRG; Sometimes referred to as Grupo Internacional Revolución in Spanish) has on occasion held a major show in December to commemorate the "birth" of Lucha Libre in their home state. It is unclear exactly when IWRG started to mark the Anniversary, records confirm that they held a show to commemorate the event starting in 2010 commemorating the 48th Anniversary of Lucha Libre in Estadio de Mexico, possibly prior to that. The 2017 show was for the 55th anniversary and was held on December 3, 2013 in Arena Naucalpan, Naucalpan, State of Mexico where IWRG holds almost all of their major lucha libre shows.

=== Storylines ===
The 56th Anniversary of Lucha Libre in Estadio de Mexico event featured seven professional wrestling matches with different wrestlers involved in pre-existing scripted feuds, plots and storylines. Wrestlers were portrayed as either heels (referred to as rudos in Mexico, those that portray the "bad guys") or faces (técnicos in Mexico, the "good guy" characters) as they followed a series of tension-building events, which culminated in a wrestling match or series of matches.

== Results ==
No.	Results	Stipulations
1	Death Metal and Hijo de Blue Monsther defeated Arquero and Mexica	Tag team match
2	Las Tortugas Negras (Ra-Zhata and Shil-Kah) defeated Black Dragón and Dinamic Black	Tag team match
3	Diosa Atenea, Multifacético 2.0, and Pasion Kristal defeated Ludark Shaitan, Soy Raymunda, and Tackle	Six-woman tag team match
4	El Demonio Infernal (Demonio Infernal, Eterno, and Lunatic Xtreme) defeated Eragón, El Hijo del Alebrije, and Relámpago	Six-man tag team match
5	Black Terry, Dr. Cerebro, Imposible, Ovett, Toscano, and Último Gladiador defeated Dowki, Hip Hop Man, Heddi Karaoui, El Mosca, Musashi, and Zumbi	Copa Higher Power Torneo cibernetico elimination match
6	Aramís (Capu) lost to Freelance (Reyes Rosas) and Alas de Acero (Chiquillin)	Three-way Lucha de Apuestas, hair vs. hair of their cornerman match
7	Capo del Norte, Capo del Sur, and Máscara Año 2000 Jr. defeated Rokambole Jr., Villano IV, and Villano V Jr.	Six-man tag team match

== See also ==
- 2018 in professional wrestling
- Professional wrestling in Mexico
