= PALL 1st Anniversary Show =

2018 International Wrestling Revolution Group event

- Promotions: Promotores Asociados de Lucha Libre; International Wrestling Revolution Group; Gladiatores Azteca Wrestling; Mexca Wrestling; MDA Lucha Libre
- Date: December 1, 2019
- City: Naucalpan, State of Mexico
- Venue: Arena Naucalpan

Event chronology
← Previous; El Castillo del Terror	Next → 57th Anniversary of Lucha Libre in Estado de México

The PALL 1st Anniversary Show ("Primer Aniversario de PALL" in Spanish) is a scheduled professional wrestling supercard event produced by Mexican professional wrestling promotion International Wrestling Revolution Group (IWRG) alongside its partners in the "Promotores Asociados de Lucha Libre" ("Associated promotions of professional wrestling") group to celebrate the anniversary of the group. The show took place on December 1, 2019 in Arena Naucalpan, Naucalpan, State of Mexico, Mexico.

For the PALL 1st Anniversary show Demonio Infernal and Fresero Jr. will both risk their hair on the outcome of the main event match. The show will also include a match for the vacant IWRG Intercontinental Tag Team Championship. The fifth match of the night is scheduled to be a rematch between Internacional Pantera and the wrestler who won his mask in 2006, Misterioso Jr.

== Production ==
=== Background ===
Several minor Mexican independent circuit professional wrestling promotions joined together late 2018 to form an overall sanctioning body called Promotores Asociados de Lucha Libre ("Promotional Association of Professional Wrestling"; PALL) to act as a unifying organization for wrestling promotions International Wrestling Revolution Group (IWRG), Lucha Memes, Lucha Libre Boom, Promociones NOBA, Pleu Sports, MDA Lucha Libre, Generación XXI, GCC and Tortas Súper Astro. The various companies would collaborate on events, coordinate to make sure they were not holding shows on the same day. For the wrestlers PALL had a fund to help support wrestlers who were injured during a PALL sanctioned show as well as give them support in promoting them across Mexico. The first co-promoted show under the PALL banner took place on August 31, 2018 in Arena Naucalpan, in Naucalpan, State of Mexico, owned by the IWRG.

=== Storylines ===
The show will feature seven professional wrestling matches with different wrestlers involved in pre-existing scripted feuds, plots and storylines. Wrestlers were portrayed as either heels (referred to as rudos in Mexico, those that portray the "bad guys") or faces (técnicos in Mexico, the "good guy" characters) as they followed a series of tension-building events, which culminated in a wrestling match or series of matches.

The seeds for the shows main event was sown on September 16, 2019, when Fresero Jr. and his tag team partner Mr. Iguana defeated Demonio Infernal and Warrior Jr. after which Fresero Jr. made a challenge for Demonio Infernal's IWRG Rey del Ring Championship. Two weeks later Demonio Infernal successfully defended the championship against Fresero Jr. On the October 27 IWRG show Fresero Jr. helped El Hijo de Canis Lupus defend the IWRG Intercontinental Heavyweight Championship against Demonio Infernal by interfering in the match. Following the match Demonio Infernal made a Lucha de Apuestas, "hair vs hair" match challenge. Fresero Jr. defeated Demonio Infernal in a Super Libre, no disqualification match, on November 24, followed by accepting the Apuesta challenge.

On March 24, 2019, Aramís and Imposible defeated Heddi Karaoui and Death Metal to win the vacant IWRG Intercontinental Tag Team Championship. The duo defended the championship twice in the subsequent months, defeating Capo del Norte and Capo del Sur on April 10, and then El Hijo de Canis Lupus and Dragón Bane On April 28. When the full show for the PALL 1st Anniversary show was announced, IWRG revealed that Aramís and Imposible were no longer champions, instead six tag teams would wye for the championship: Los Traumas ( Trauma I and Trauma II), Los Alas (Alas de Oro and Alas de Plata), Los Fulgors (Fulgor I and II), Ave Rex and Toxin and US representatives Bryce Benjamin and Marshe Rockett, better known as Da Soul Touchaz.

In 2006 Internacional Pantera, then known simply as "El Pantera" lost a steel cage match to Misterioso Jr., which also included El Sagrado, Volador Jr., Nitro, Neutron, Mascara Purpura, Averno, Mephisto, El Felino, Sangre Azteca, La Máscara. As a result of the Lucha de Apuestas, or "bet match" stipulation Pantera was forced to unmask. After unmasking he revealed his real name, Francisco Javier Pozas, as part of the Lucha Libre tradition. Pantera later left CMLL and began to wear his mask again, claiming that CMLL had not paid for the mask loss, thus he did not honor the stipulation of the match and resumed wrestling with the mask on.

== Results ==
No.	Results	Stipulations
1	Marado, Killer Croc, and Neza Kid defeated Ángel Estrella, Fusion Estrella Jr., and Shadow Boy	Best two-out-of-three falls six-man tag team match
2	Black Dragón and Eragón vs. Dragón Fly and La Mosca ended in a double pin draw	Best two-out-of-three falls tag team match
3	Freelance, Legendario, and Puma de Oro defeated Avisman, Death Metal, and Dick Angelo 3G	Best two-out-of-three falls six-man tag team match
4	Los Big Strippers (Big Chico Che, Big Mike, and Big Ovett) defeated Capo del Norte, Capo del Sur, and Fly Warrior and Diva Salvaje, Jessy Ventura, and Pasion Cristal	Best two-out-of-three falls six-man tag team match
5	Internacional Pantera defeated Misterioso Jr.	Singles match
6	Los Traumas ( Trauma I and Trauma II), Dragón/El Hijo del Impostor defeated Bryce Benjamin and Marshe Rockett, Alas de Oro/Alas de Plata, Fulgor I/Fly Warrior, and Hip Hop Man/Toxin	seeding battle royal for the IWRG Intercontinental Tag Team Championship tournament
7	Los Traumas ( Trauma I and Trauma II) defeated Dragón and El Hijo del Impostor	IWRG Intercontinental Tag Team Championship tournament semifinal match
8	Alas de Oro and Alas De Plata defeated Fly Star and Fulgor I	IWRG Intercontinental Tag Team Championship tournament quarterfinal match
9	Bryce Benjamin and Marshe Rockett defeated Hip Hop Man and Toxin	IWRG Intercontinental Tag Team Championship tournament quarterfinal match
10	Bryce Benjamin and Marshe Rockett defeated Alas de Oro and Fulgor I	IWRG Intercontinental Tag Team Championship tournament semifinal match
11	Bryce Benjamin and Marshe Rockett defeated Los Traumas ( Trauma I and Trauma II)	IWRG Intercontinental Tag Team Championship tournament final match
12	Demonio Infernal defeated Fresero Jr.	Best two-out-of-three falls match, Lucha de Apuestas, hair vs. hair rules
