= 49th Anniversary of Lucha Libre in Estado de México =

2011 International Wrestling Revolution Group event

- Official poster for the event depicting the main event competitors
- Promotion: International Wrestling Revolution Group
- Date: December 4, 2011
- City: Naucalpan, State of Mexico
- Venue: Arena Naucalpan

Event chronology
← Previous; Batalla Extrema	Next → Arena Naucalpan 34th Anniversary Show

Anniversary of Lucha Libre in Estado de México Shows chronology
← Previous; 48th Anniversary	Next → 50th Anniversary

The 49th Anniversary of Lucha Libre in Estado de México was celebrated by a major professional wrestling show produced and scripted by the Mexican lucha libre promotion International Wrestling Revolution Group (IWRG; sometimes referred to as Grupo Internacional Revolución in Mexico) and took place on December 4, 2011 in Arena Naucalpan, Naucalpan, State of Mexico (Estado de México). The event commemorated the sport of lucha libre becoming allowed in the State of Mexico, with the first lucha libre show held in the state taking place in December 1962. Over the years IWRG has on occasion celebrated the anniversary, although not consistently holding an anniversary show every year.

The main event was a special best two-out-of-three-falls eight-man tag team match between a team that represented wrestlers who used to work for the Universal Wrestling Association (UWA) and a team of wrestlers that all used to work for Consejo Mundial de Lucha Libre (CMLL) at one point. Team "UWA" (Canek, El Brazo, Head Hunter A and Negro Navarro) defeated Team "CMLL" (Lizmark Jr., Rayman, Rayo de Jalisco Jr. and El Texano Jr.) two falls to one. The show featured four additional matches.

== Production ==
=== Background ===
The history of lucha libre, or professional wrestling in Mexico goes all the way back to the early 1900s where individual promoters would hold shows on a local basis in various Mexican states. In 1933 Salvador Lutteroth created Empresa Mexicana de Lucha Libre (EMLL; Spanish for "Mexican Wrestling Enterprise") and in subsequent years took EMLL to a national level. In the 1930s and 1940s various Mexican states (as well as Mexico City, which is a federal district and not part of any state) began to create lucha libre commissions, often as an extension of the existing boxing commissions, responsible for overview of lucha libre in each state, licensing wrestlers and ensuring the rules were being enforced. In the State of Mexico lucha libre was not officially sanctioned until late 1962, with the first lucha libre show in the state held in December 1962.

The Mexican wrestling promotion International Wrestling Revolution Group (IWRG; sometimes referred to as Grupo Internacional Revolución in Spanish) has on occasion held a major show in December to commemorate the "birth" of Lucha Libre in its home state. It is unclear exactly when IWRG started to mark the Anniversary; records confirm that they held a show to commemorate the event starting in 2010 commemorating the 48th Anniversary of Lucha Libre in Estado de Mexico, possibly prior to that. The 2011 show was for the 49th anniversary and was held on December 4, 2011 in Arena Naucalpan, Naucalpan, State of Mexico where IWRG holds almost all of its major shows.

=== Storylines ===
The event featured five professional wrestling matches with different wrestlers involved in pre-existing scripted feuds, plots and storylines. Wrestlers were portrayed as either heels (referred to as rudos in Mexico, those that portray the "bad guys") or faces (técnicos in Mexico, the "good guy" characters) as they followed a series of tension-building events, which culminated in a wrestling match or series of matches.

== Event ==
In the opening match Principe Salvaje ("Prince Savage") made his IWRG debut, replacing Rambo Jr. who was either unable to compete or replaced to give Principe Salvaje his debut. Salvaje, Alan Extreme and Carta Brava Jr. lost to técnicos of Dinamic Black, El Hijo del Pantera and Tritón. (Note: Not the same Tritón who made his debut for Consejo Mundial de Lucha Libre in 2011.) After the match the crowd showed their appreciation for the match by throwing money into the ring. During the second match the rudo Apolo Estrada Jr. (who was teamed up with El Hijo del Médico Asesino and El Hijo de Pirata Morgan) pulled the mask off Hijo de Máscara Sagrada (who was teaming up with El Hijo de LA Park, and Trauma I for the night). Estrada Jr. used the distraction and surprise to pin Hijo de Máscara Sagrada to win the match for this team.

Super Raton (a wrestler dressed like Mighty Mouse) was originally announced, teaming with his Trio Fantasia ("The Fantasy Trio") Super Muñeco ("Super Doll") and Súper Pinocho ("Super Pinocchio"), a team of kid oriented characters who hit the height of their popularity in the 1980s and early 1990s. On the night of the show IWRG had to replace Super Raton with Black Terry but never officially explained why Super Raton was not able to wrestle. The trio faced off against another "old school" trio, known as El Triangulo de la Muerte ("The Triangle of Death"; Cuchillo, Kahoz and Rambo) a trio that had worked primarily for the Universal Wrestling Association (UWA). In the third fall of the match Cuchillo pulled his own mask off and threw it to Super Pinocho, making it look like Super Pinocho unmasked Cuchilllo. According to lucha libre rules unmasking an opponent is an automatic disqualification, which the referee called, thinking it was intentional by Super Pinocho.

Prior to the fourth match of the night IWRG introduced a new masked wrestler, Canis Lupus (Latin for "Wolf") who came to the ring to greet the fans and shake the hands of the wrestlers involved in the fourth match. Pantera refused to shake Canis Lupus' hand, which led to an argument between the two. The rudo team of Los Junior Dinamitas (Cien Caras Jr., Hijo de Máscara Año 2000, Máscara Año 2000 Jr.) took advantage of the distraction as they jumped Pantera and his partners El Ángel and Ultraman to start the match. Los Junior Dinamitas kept the advantage and won the match, after which Canis Lupus attacked Pantera.

The main event was originally supposed to have Fuerza Guerrera team up with Rayo de Jalisco Jr. who captained a team that also included his son Rayman, Lizmark Jr., all former Consejo Mundial de Lucha Libre (CMLL) wrestlers. IWRG brought in El Texano Jr. as the replacements as he had also worked for CMLL for years. The team faced off against El Canek, El Brazo, Negro Navarro and Head Hunter A, a team that represented the now closed UWA. The UWA team won the first and the third fall, winning final fall after El Canek got away with cheating, hitting Rayo de Jalisco Jr. with a low blow while the referee was looking in a different direction.

== Results ==
No.	Results	Stipulations
1	Dinamic Black, El Hijo del Pantera and Tritón defeated Alan Extreme, Carta Brava Jr. and Príncipe Salvaje	Best two-out-of-three-falls six-man tag team match
2	Apolo Estrada Jr., El Hijo del Médico Asesino and El Hijo de Pirata Morgan defeated El Hijo de LA Park, Hijo de Máscara Sagrada and Trauma I	Best two-out-of-three-falls six-man tag team match
3	Black Terry and Trio Fantasia (Super Muñeco and Súper Pinocho) defeated El Triangulo de la Muerte (Cuchillo, Kahoz and Rambo) by disqualification	Best two-out-of-three-falls six-man tag team match
4	Los Junior Dinamitas (Cien Caras Jr., Hijo de Máscara Año 2000, Máscara Año 2000 Jr.) defeated El Ángel, Pantera and Ultraman	Best two-out-of-three-falls six-man tag team match
5	Canek, El Brazo, Head Hunter A and Negro Navarro defeated Lizmark Jr., Rayman, Rayo de Jalisco Jr. and El Texano Jr.	Best two-out-of-three-falls eight-man tag team match

== See also ==
- 2011 in professional wrestling
- Professional wrestling in Mexico
