= La Jaula de Las Locas (2019) =

2019 International Wrestling Revolution Group event

- Official poster for the event showing the exóticos and women who risked their hair or mask in the main event.
- Promotion: International Wrestling Revolution Group
- Date: June 7, 2019
- City: Naucalpan, State of Mexico
- Venue: Arena Naucalpan

Event chronology
← Previous; Festival de las Máscaras	Next → El Castillo del Terror

La Jaula de Las Locas chronology
← Previous; 2015	Next → —

La Jaula de Las Locas (Spanish lit. "The Cage of the Crazy Ones", a reference to the Spanish title of La Cage aux Folles) was a special professional wrestling event produced by the International Wrestling Revolution Group (IWRG), that took place on June 7, 2019 at Arena Naucalpan in Naucalpan, State of Mexico. The focal point of the show and the inspiration for the event name was the main event steel cage match, an inter-gender match that saw both female wrestlers and male Exótico (drag wrestlers) compete against each other. The cage match was contested under Luchas de Apuestas, or "bet match", rules where the last wrestler in the cage would be deemed the loser, losing either their wrestling mask or their hair if they were already unmasked.

In the main event eleven wrestlers competed in the cage, which saw Pasion Kristal and Óscar El Hermoso as the last two wrestlers in the cage, followed by Soy Raymunda returning to help Óscar El Hermoso cheat, and ended up losing the match and her hair as a result of the match. The match also included Miss Gaviota, Demasiado, Lolita, Diva Salvaje, Lilith Dark, Ludark Shaitan, Diosa Atenea, and Jessy Ventura. The show included five additional matches.

== Production ==
=== Background ===
Starting as far back as at least 2000, the Mexican wrestling promotion International Wrestling Revolution Group (IWRG; Sometimes referred to as Grupo Internacional Revolución in Spanish) has held several annual events where the main event was a multi-man steel cage match where the last wrestler left in the cage would be forced to either remove their wrestling mask or have their hair shaved off under Lucha de Apuestas, or "bet match", rules. Starting in 2011 IWRG began holding a special version of the steel cage match concept under the name Guerra de Sexos, or "War of the Sexes", as they held a show centered on an inter-gender steel cage match main event that saw men and women fight each other with their mask or hair on the line. In 2015 IWRG held a cage match that featured only female wrestlers and Exótico or drag wrestlers in the cage, branding it as La Jaula de las Locas ("The Cage of the Crazy Ones") instead of Guerra de Sexos. The La Jaula de las Locas shows, as well as the majority of the IWRG shows in general, are held in "Arena Naucalpan", owned by the promoters of IWRG and their main arena.

=== Storylines ===
The event featured six professional wrestling matches with different wrestlers involved in pre-existing scripted feuds, plots and storylines. Wrestlers were portrayed as either heels (referred to as rudos in Mexico, those that portray the "bad guys") or faces (técnicos in Mexico, the "good guy" characters) as they followed a series of tension-building events, which culminated in a wrestling match or series of matches.

== Event ==
After the second match of the night, officials and wrestlers gathered in the ring to honor Perro Aguayo, who had died four days prior to the show. In the fifth match of the night the team of Herodes Jr., El Hijo de Pirata Morgan, El Hijo de Sangre Chicana, and Rokambole Jr. defeated Diva Salvaje and El Infierno Eternal (Demonio Infernal, Eterno, and Lunatik Xtreme) when El Hijo de Pirata Morgan pinned Demonio Infernal to get the win for his team. Afterwards El Hijo de Pirata Morgan challenge Demonio Infernal to defend the IWRG Rey del Ring Championship against him at a later date.

The main event steel cage match, started with a period of time where none of the wrestlers were allowed to climb out of the cage to escape the match. After several escapes the last four wrestlers in the ring were Ludark Shaitan, Lilita, Pasion Cristal and Óscar El Hermoso. Both Lolita and Ludark escaped, leaving the two exóticos in the cage. At that point Soy Raymunda returned to the cage after having escaped earlier, trying to help his tag team partner Óscar from losing the match. In the end the attempt to help backfired as Pasion Cristal left Soy Raymunda in the ring, forcing her to be shaved completely bald as per the Lucha de Apuestas rules.

== Results ==
No.	Results	Stipulations
1	Auzter defeated Neza Kid	Tag team Best two-out-of-three falls match
2	Canibal Jr. and Death Metal defeated Atomic Star and Brazo De Oro Jr.	Tag team match
3	Black Dragón, Dinamic Black, and El Hijo del Alebrije defeated Dragón Fly, La Mosca, and Marado by disqualification	Six-man tag team match
4	La Mala Hierba (Centurion and Fly Warrior) defeated Los Fulgors (Fulgor I and Fulgor II) and Los Terrible Cerebros (Cerebro Negro and Dr. Cerebro)	Three team tag team match
5	Herodes Jr., El Hijo de Pirata Morgan, El Hijo de Sangre Chicana, and Rokambole Jr. defeated Diva Salvaje and El Infierno Eternal (Demonio Infernal, Eterno, and Lunatik Xtreme)	Eight-man tag team match
6	Pasion Kristal defeated Soy Raymunda; Also in the match: Óscar El Hermoso, Miss Gaviota, Demasiado, Lolita, Diva Salvaje, Lilith Dark, Ludark Shaitan, Diosa Atenea, and Jessy Ventura	Jaula de las Locas intergender ten-person steel cage match, Luchas de Apuestas, mask or hair match
