= Toscano (wrestler) =

Mexican professional wrestler

Personal information
- Born: Oziel Toscano Jasso; December 20, 1973 (age 52) Monterrey, Nuevo León, Mexico
- Spouse: Tania

Professional wrestling career
- Ring names: Armando Fernandez; Babe Toscano/Baby Toscano; Tarzan Boy; Toscano; Tarzan Toscano; Zorro
- Billed height: 1.78 m (5 ft 10 in)
- Billed weight: 93 kg (205 lb)
- Billed from: Monterrey, Nuevo León, Mexico
- Trained by: Blue Fish
- Debut: November 27, 1993

Oziel Toscano Jasso (born December 20, 1973) is a Mexican professional wrestler. He has achieved most success under the ring names Tarzan Boy and Toscano. After making his professional wrestling debut in 1993 he has worked for a number of notable promotions in and outside of Mexico such as Consejo Mundial de Lucha Libre, AAA, the World Wrestling Federation, International Wrestling Revolution Group, and Promo Azteca. Toscano's ring character is that of a Latin hearth-throb. He has also competed under the ring names Armando Fernandez, Baby Toscano/Babe Toscano, Tarzan Toscano, and Zorro during his career.

Toscano was one of the original founders of the Los Guerreros del Infierno group in 2001 and was a member off and on until 2008. He later helped create the La Furia del Norte group that morphed into the Los Perros del Mal group. He was later part of AAA's El Consejo group, with other former CMLL wrestlers. During his career he has been a one-time NWA World Light Heavyweight Champion, a two-time CMLL World Trios Champion (with Héctor Garza/El Terrible and Último Guerrero/Atlantis), and holder of the AAA World Trios Champion. He also won the 2003 Leyenda de Plata tournament.

== Professional wrestling career ==
Toscano made his in-ring debut on November 27, 1993, after being trained by local Monterrey trainer Blue Fish. He initially adopted the ring name Babe Toscano (sometimes "Baby Toscano"), working for the local Federacion International de Lucha Libre (FILL) promotion. By 1995 Toscano, Humberto Garza Jr., and El Region defeated Los Ku Klux Klan in a Lucha de Apuestas to unmask them, and then followed up with another victory a week later that forced Los Ku Klux Klan to be shaved bald as a result of losing a second Lucha de Apuestas match.

=== Promo Azteca (1996–1997) ===
By late 1996, Toscano began working for Promo Azteca. Initially, he wrestled as "El Zorro", based on the fictional Zorro vigilante. The character was shortlived and soon after Jesús Martínez took over the role of El Zorro. Once he gave up the El Zorro character, he began working as "Tarzan Boy", a mid-card tecnico character.

=== World Wrestling Federation (1998–1999) ===
Toscano was one of several Mexican professional wrestlers who worked for the World Wrestling Federation's (WWF) Super Astros television program. He was billed as "Armando Fernandez", portraying a variation of his Latin heart-throb character. His first match took place on August 24, 1998, as he defeated Sho Funaki, in a dark match before Shotgun Saturday Night. His last match for the WWF was on March 15, 1999, as he defeated El Bandido on a Super Astros match. His departure from WWE is due to the cancellation of the Super Astros program given that the company was dealing with the lawsuit from Owen Hart's wife due to his death and said company chose to end the program.

=== Consejo Mundial de Lucha Libre (1998–2011) ===
He was turned rudo (Spanish term referring to heel wrestlers) and aligned with Rey Bucanero and Último Guerrero to form Los Guerreros del Infierno. Los Guerreros del Infierno feuded with Los Nuevos Infernales (Satánico, Averno, and Mephisto), the stable that Bucanero and Ultimo had recently abandoned.

Tarzan was programmed with Satánico, while Bucanero and Último were programmed with Averno and Mephisto. The rudo turn proved to be a great move because Tarzan Boy was finally accepted as a headliner and the fans took to his heel turn since they had been booing him as a face. Tarzan later joined a couple of other stables. He joined La Furia del Norte with Héctor Garza, Perro Aguayo Jr., and El Terrible; and later joined Los Perros del Mal with Perro Aguayo Jr., Héctor Garza and others. During his career, Tarzan has won the hair of Satánico twice, Negro Casas, Pirata Morgan, Pierroth Jr., and Brazo de Plata, among others. He has lost his hair twice, once to Shocker on September 19, 2003, at the Arena México, and more recently to Naito in the main event of the 2009 Infierno en el Ring event.

=== Perros del Mal / AAA (2011–2013) ===
After leaving CMLL, Toscano made his debut for the Perros del Mal promotion on November 12, 2011. In early 2012 he lost a six-way match to Hector Garza, where the winner would get a match for the Mexican National Heavyweight Championship.

On December 8, 2011, Toscano appeared at a press conference, where it was announced that he was joining CMLL's rival promotion AAA, becoming the third CMLL worker, after Héctor Garza and El Texano Jr., to leave the promotion for AAA within a 30-day period. Toscano made his AAA debut on December 16 at Guerra de Titanes, forming a group known as El Consejo ("The Council") with former CMLL wrestler Texano Jr. and Máscara Año 2000 Jr. On January 21, 2012, Mortiz and Semental joined El Consejo, pushing the storyline that the group was against both the tecnicos and rudos of AAA. El Consejo's first big match in AAA took place on March 18 at Rey de Reyes, where Toscano, El Texano Jr., and Máscara Año 2000 Jr. defeated AAA representatives Dr. Wagner Jr., Electroshock and Heavy Metal, following interference from the stable's newest member, El Hombre de Negro. On May 19, Toscano, El Texano Jr., and Máscara Año 2000 Jr. defeated Los Psycho Circus (Monster Clown, Murder Clown, and Psycho Clown), again after interference from El Hombre de Negro, to win the AAA World Trios Championship. On June 16, El Hombre de Negro unmasked and revealed himself as Máscara Año 2000. On December 21, Toscano seemingly quit El Consejo, after inadvertently costing the stable a non-title match against Los Psycho Circus, after which he came to blows with El Texano Jr. However, he later claimed to still be a part of El Consejo, claiming that his problems were with the group's new leader, Silver King, while also trying to convince El Texano Jr. and Máscara Año 2000 Jr. to take his side in the matter. On February 18, 2013, El Consejo lost the AAA World Trios Championship back to Los Psycho Circus, when Toscano turned on El Texano Jr.

Toscano then formed a partnership with Alan Stone and El Elegido, named Los Mirreyes (loosely translated to "The Rich Kids"). On March 17, Toscano was eliminated from the 2013 Rey del Ring tournament, pinned by El Canek. Toscano worked his last AAA match on December 20, 2013, teaming with El Hijo del Fantasma and Steve Pain in a loss to Fénix, Angélico, and Jack Evans.

=== International Wrestling Revolution Group (2000–2019) ===
Starting in 2000, Toscano has worked for International Wrestling Revolution Group (IWRG) off-and-on since then. His contracts with CMLL and AAA granted him the ability to work for independent circuit promotions for nights when CMLL or AAA did not have him scheduled for a show. On October 9, 2008, Toscano was one of ten wrestlers vying for a match for the IWRG Rey del Ring Championship in an elimination match, where each eliminated wrestler would remain around the ring with a leather strap to use. The match was won by Máscara Año 2000 Jr., with Toscano being the last man eliminated.

In 2012, Toscano worked IWRG's annual Guerra de Sexos show, teaming with Texano Jr. to defeat Los Junior Dinamitas (Cien Caras Jr. and Máscara Año 2000 Jr.) on the undercard of the show. The following year Toscano was one of 16 wrestlers risking their mask or hair at IWRG's Guerra del Golfo event. Toscano escaped the steel cage match without losing his hair, as Chico Che lost to Apolo Estrada Jr. at the end of the show. He returned to IWRG in 2014, starting with that year's Guerra del Golfo event. In late 2015 he returned to IWRG once more, this time for a month-long run of regular appearances and storyline feuds. He was forced to team up with Diva Salvaje for a Ruleta de la Muerte (Roulette of death) tournament, where the loser in the final would be forced to be shaved bald. Toscano and Diva Salvaje defeated Danny Casas and X-Fly in the semi-final to keep their hair safe. Following the tournament, Toscano became involved in a feud with Veneno, which led to Toscano defeating Veneno in a Lucha de Apuestas match in the main event of the 53rd Anniversary of Lucha Libre in Estado de México show. In the following weeks, Toscano turned on Danny Casas, in a feud that led to Casas defeating Toscano in a Lucha de Apuestas match on January 3, 2016, at the IWRG 20th Anniversary Show. After keeping his hair safe twice at the end of 2015, he lost the match to Casas and was forced to have his hair shaved off. Toscano would gain a measure of revenge several months later, at the 2016 Festival de las Máscaras, Toscano defeated Danny Casas, forcing Casas to have his hair shaved off.

In late 2018, Toscano risked his hair against Mr. Electro and Máscara Año 2000 Jr., in a match where Máscara Año 2000 Jr. risked his hair and Mr. Electro risked the IWRG Intercontinental Heavyweight Championship at IWRG's Arena Naucalpan 41st Anniversary Show. In the end, Máscara Año 2000 Jr. pinned Mr. Electro to win the championship. Two weeks later, at the IWRG 23rd Anniversary Show, Máscara Año 2000 Jr. defeated Toscano in a Lucha de Apuestas match, leaving Toscano bald after the match. Two months later, Toscano and Eragon wrestled Aramís and Imposible for the IWRG Intercontinental Tag Team Championship but lost the match.

== Championships and accomplishments ==
- Asistencia Asesoría y Administración
  - AAA World Trios Championship (1 time) – with Máscara Año 2000 Jr. and El Texano Jr.
- Consejo Mundial de Lucha Libre
  - CMLL World Trios Championship (2 times) – with Héctor Garza and El Terrible (1) and Último Guerrero and Atlantis (1)
  - NWA World Light Heavyweight Championship (1 time) (Note: CMLL left the National Wrestling Alliance in the late 1980s, but continued to promoted this championship with the NWA brand.)
  - Leyenda de Azul: 2003
- Pro Wrestling Illustrated
  - PWI ranked him #65 of the 500 best singles wrestlers of the PWI 500 in 2006.
- World Wrestling Organization
  - WWO World Tag Team Championship (1 time) – with Zorro

== Luchas de Apuestas record ==
Winner (wager)	Loser (wager)	Location	Event	Date	Notes
Tarzan Boy, Humberto Garza Jr. and El Regio (hair)	Los Ku Klux Klan (masks) (I, II and III)	Monterrey, Nuevo León	FILL show	June 5, 1995	
Tarzan Boy, Humberto Garza Jr. and El Regio (hair)	Los Ku Klux Klan (hair) (I, II and III)	Monterrey, Nuevo León	FILL show	June 19, 1995	
Tarzan Boy (hair)	El Monje Loco (mask)	Monterrey, Nuevo León	FILL show	1997	
Tarzan Boy (hair)	Jaibo Flores Jr. (hair)	Houston, Texas	Indy show	December 9, 1997	
Tarzan Boy (hair)	Pirata Morgan (hair)	Nuevo Laredo, Tamaulipas	Indy show	December 22, 1997	
Tarzan Boy (hair)	Andy Barrow (hair)	Unknown	Indy show	1999	
Tarzan Boy (hair)	Pimpinela Escarlata (hair)	Monterrey, Nuevo León	FILL show	February 14, 1999	
Tarzan Boy (hair)	Zapatista (mask)	Monterrey, Nuevo León	FILL show	July 19, 1999	(Note: This was a triangle match that also included Pierroth Jr.)
Tarzan Boy (hair)	Pimpinela Escarlata (hair)	Monterrey, Nuevo León	FILL show	November 15, 1999	
Tarzan Boy (hair)	Angel O Demonio (mask)	Tlalnepantla, State of Mexico	Indy show	December 27, 1999	
Tarzan Boy (hair)	El Satánico (hair)	Mexico City	CMLL show	February 25, 2000	
Tarzan Boy (hair)	El Satánico (hair)	Puebla, Puebla	CMLL show	July 17, 2000	
Tarzan Boy (hair)	Brazo de Plata (hair)	Mexico City	Sin Piedad	December 14, 2001	
Tarzan Boy (hair)	Negro Casas (hair)	Mexico City	CMLL 69th Anniversary Show	September 13, 2002	
Shocker (hair)	Tarzan Boy (hair)	Mexico City	CMLL 70th Anniversary Show	September 19, 2003	
Los Guerreros del Infierno (hair) (Rey Bucanero and Tarzan Boy)	Los Perros del Mal (hair) (Damián 666 and Mr. Águila)	Mexico City	50. Aniversario de Arena México	April 28, 2006	
Tarzan Boy (hair)	Pierroth Jr. (hair)	Mexico City	CMLL show	December 30, 2006	(Note: This was a Steel cage match that also included Atlantis, Último Guerrero, Damián 666, Mr. Águila, Pierroth II and Hijo de Pierroth.)
Heavy Metal (hair)	Toscano (hair)	Mexico City	Super Viernes	May 23, 2008	(Note: This was a triangle match that also included Perro Aguayo Jr.)
Naito (hair)	Toscano (hair)	Mexico City	Infierno en el Ring	July 31, 2009	
Toscano (hair)	Veneno (hair)	Naucalpan, State of Mexico	52nd Anniversary of Lucha Libre in Estado de México	December 7, 2014	
Danny Casas (hair)	Toscano (hair)	Naucalpan, State of Mexico	IWRG 20th Anniversary Show	January 3, 2016	
Toscano (hair)	Danny Casas (hair)	Naucalpan, State of Mexico	Festival de las Máscaras	June 5, 2016	(Note: Toscano and Casas lost a four-man Steel cage match earlier in the night.)
Máscara Año 2000 Jr. (hair)	Toscano (hair)	Naucalpan, State of Mexico	IWRG 23rd Anniversary Show	January 1, 2019	(Note: This was a steel cage match)
