= El Castillo del Terror (2018) =

2018 International Wrestling Revolution Group event

- Official poster for the event
- Promotion: International Wrestling Revolution Group
- Date: November 1, 2018
- City: Naucalpan, State of Mexico
- Venue: Arena Naucalpan
- Tagline(s): 12 Máscaras en juego (12 Masks on the line)

Event chronology
← Previous; Relevos Increibles de Máscaras y Cabelleras	Next → Triangular en Jaula

El Castillo del Terror chronology
← Previous; 2017	Next → —

El Castillo del Terror (2018) (Spanish for "The Tower of Terror") was a major professional wrestling event, the eleventh annual El Castillo del Terror event, scripted and produced by the International Wrestling Revolution Group (IWRG) that took place on November 1, 2018. IWRG has held their Castillo del Terror show since 2005, usually late in the year. As with the majority of the IWRG shows it will take place at Arena Naucalpan in Naucalpan, State of Mexico, the home of IWRG. The main event is the eponymous Castillo del Terror Steel cage match where the last person eliminated would be forced to unmasked per the Lucha de Apuestas, or "bet match", stipulation.

For the 2018 event 10 men and 2 women all put their masks on the line in the steel cage which ended with Tortuga Mike defeating and unmasking Oficial Spector. In addition Passion Kristal defeated Fantasma de la Opera in a Lucha de Apuestas, hair vs. hair match, forcing Fantasma de la Opera to have all his hair shaved off after the loss.

== Production ==
=== Background ===
Starting as far back as at least 2002, the Mexican wrestling promotion International Wrestling Revolution Group (IWRG; Sometimes referred to as Grupo Internacional Revolución in Spanish) has held several annual events where the main event was a multi-man steel cage match where the last wrestler left in the cage would be forced to either remove their wrestling mask or have their hair shaved off under Lucha de Apuestas, or "bet match", rules. From 2005 IWRG has promoted a fall show, around the Mexican Day of the Death, under the name El Castillo del Terror ("The Tower of Terror"), to distinguish it from other Steel cage matches held throughout the year such as the IWRG Guerra del Golfo ("Gulf War"), IWRG Guerra de Sexos ("War of the Sexes"), or IWRG Prisión Fatal ("Deadly Prison") shows. The Castillo del Terror shows, as well as the majority of the IWRG shows in general, are held in "Arena Naucalpan", owned by the promoters of IWRG and their main arena. The 2018 Castillo del Terror show will be the 14th year in a row that IWRG has promoted a show under that name.

=== Storylines ===
The El Castillo del Terror event featured an undisclosed number of professional wrestling matches with different wrestlers involved in pre-existing scripted feuds, plots and storylines. Wrestlers portrayed themselves as either heels (referred to as rudos in Mexico, those that portray the "bad guys") or faces (técnicos in Mexico, the "good guy" characters) as they followed a series of tension-building events, which culminated in wrestling matches.

After losing the main event match, Oficial Spector took the microphone and revealed that his real name was Jose Manuel Mejia, born in 1975 and that he had been a professional wrestler for 30 years at the time of the cage match. With the revelation of his real name it was confirmed that he was the same person who had previously worked under the name "Arlequín" and "Arlequín Amarilla" and had lost the "Arlequín Amarilla" mask at the 2008 El Castillo del Terror exactly 10 years prior.

== Matches ==
No.	Results	Stipulations
1	Lunatik Xtreme defeated Mexica, Alas de Acero, Shadow Boy and Power Bull	Five-way match
2	Los Oficiales (Oficial 911, Oficial AK-47, and Oficial Fierro) defeated Demonio Infernal, Boy Raymunda, and Ovett	Lumberjack match
3	Pasion Kristal defeated Fantasma de la Ópera	Luchas de Apuestas, hair vs. hair Match
4	Cuervo de Puerto Rico defeated Último Gladiador and El Hijo de Dos Caras	Hardcore match
5	Tortuga Mike defeated Oficial Spector Also in the match: Aramís, Diosa Atenea, Dragón Bane, El Hijo del Alebrije, El Hijo de Canis Lupus, Relámpago, Ludark Shaitan, Shil-Kah, Tortuga Leo and Zumbi	12-person El Castillo del Terror, Luchas de Apuestas, Mask vs. Mask Match
