= 53rd Anniversary of Lucha Libre in Estado de México =

2015 International Wrestling Revolution Group event

53rd Anniversary of Lucha Libre in Estado de Mexico
- Poster that advertised Titán and Tritón appearing on the show
- Promotion: International Wrestling Revolution Group
- Date: December 16, 2015 (aired December 22, 2015 (AYM Sports))
- City: Naucalpan, State of Mexico
- Venue: Arena Naucalpan

Event chronology
← Previous; Ruleta de la Muerte	Next → Arena Naucalpan 38th Anniversary Show

Anniversary of Lucha Libre in Estado de México Shows chronology
← Previous; 52nd Anniversary	Next → 54th Anniversary

The 53rd Anniversary of Lucha Libre in Estado de Mexico show was a professional wrestling supercard event produced by Mexican professional wrestling promotion International Wrestling Revolution Group (IWRG), and took place on December 16, 2015 in Arena Naucalpan, Naucalpan, State of Mexico, Mexico. The event commemorated the sport of lucha libre becoming allowed in the State of Mexico, with the first lucha libre show held in the state taking place in December 1962. Over the years IWRG has on occasion celebrated the anniversary, although not consistently holding an anniversary show every year.

The main event of the five-match show was a best two-out-of-three falls six-man "Lucha Libre rules" tag team match. IWRG had originally advertised wrestlers Titán and Tritón from Consejo Mundial de Lucha Libre (CMLL) for the main event, but CMLL cancelled Titán and Tritón's appearance on the show. Instead IWRG paired Argos up with Crazy Boy and Danny Casas as late replacements. The team lost to La Famila de Tijuana ( Damián 666, Halloween, and X-Fly). The show featured four additional matches, including the first appearance of Mini Psycho Clown working as the masked "Dr. Karontes" after leaving Lucha Libre AAA Worldwide in the weeks before the anniversary show.

== Production ==
=== Background ===
The history of lucha libre, or professional wrestling in Mexico goes all the way back to the early 1900s where individual promoters would hold shows on a local basis in various Mexican states. In 1933 Salvador Lutteroth created Empresa Mexicana de Lucha Libre (EMLL; Spanish for "Mexican Wrestling Enterprise") and in subsequent years took EMLL to a national level. In the 1930s and 1940s various Mexican starts to create lucha libre commissions, often as an extension of the existing Boxing commissions, responsible for overview of lucha libre in each state, licensing wrestlers and ensuring the rules are being enforced. In the State of Mexico lucha libre was not officially sanctioned in late 1962, with the first lucha libre show in the State of Mexico held in December 1962.

The Mexican wrestling promotion International Wrestling Revolution Group (IWRG; Sometimes referred to as Grupo Internacional Revolución in Spanish) has on occasion held a major show in December to commemorate the "birth" of Lucha Libre in their home state. It is unclear exactly when IWRG started to mark the Anniversary, records confirm that they held a show to commemorate the event starting in 2010 commemorating the 48th Anniversary of Lucha Libre in Estadio de Mexico, possibly prior to that. The 2015 show was for the 53rd anniversary and was held on December 16, 2015, in Arena Naucalpan, Naucalpan, State of Mexico where IWRG holds almost all of their major lucha libre shows.

=== Storylines ===
The event featured five professional wrestling matches with different wrestlers involved in pre-existing scripted feuds, plots and storylines. Wrestlers were portrayed as either heels (referred to as rudos in Mexico, those that portray the "bad guys") or faces (técnicos in Mexico, the "good guy" characters) as they followed a series of tension-building events, which culminated in a wrestling match or series of matches.

== Event ==
In the opening match, a best two-out-of-three falls tag team match, Alas de Acero and Aramís defeated Los Ángeles de la Muerte (I and II) two falls to one. The second match of the night introduced a new "Dr. Karontes" to the public, after having previously worked as "Mini Karontes" elsewhere. Dr. Karontes, Hip Hop Man and Imposible defeated the trio of Kaling Black, Látigo, and Rocket Rojo.

In the third match of the night, Los Insoportables ("The Unbearables"; Apolo Estrada Jr. and Eterno) defeated longtime rivals Los Mariachis Locos ("The Crazy Mariachis": El Diablo Jr. and El Hijo del Diablo) two falls to one. The fourth match of the night featured 3 second-generation wrestlers as El Hijo de Mascara Sagrada (son of Mascara Sagrada, and El Hijo del Alebrije (son of El Alebrije) teamed up with Emperador Azteca to face off against Halloween Jr. (son of Halloween), Canis Lupus and Tony Rivera. The match ended when Halloween Jr. fouled El Hijo de Mascara Sagrada, causing his team to be disqualified. After the match Halloween Jr. Canis Lupus and Rivera stole the masks of their opponents.

The main event match was originally supposed to include Titán and Tritón from Consejo Mundial de Lucha Libre (CMLL) teaming up with Argos for the match. For unexplained reasons neither of the two CMLL wrestlers showed up for the show, which meant that IWRG had Argos team up with Crazy Boy and Danny Casas to take on La Famila de Tijuana (Damián 666, Halloween, and X-Fly). La Famila won the match after Damián 666 fouled Argos without the referee seeing it, pinning him seconds later. After the match fans threw money in the ring in appreciation of the match they had just watched.

== Results ==
No.	Results	Stipulations
1	Alas de Acero and Aramís defeated Ángel de la Muerte I and Ángel de la Muerte II	Best two-out-of-three falls tag team match
2	Dr. Karonte, Hip Hop Man, and Imposible defeated Kaling Black, Látigo, and Rocket Rojo	Best two-out-of-three falls six-man "Lucha Libre rules" tag team match
3	Los Insoportables (Apolo Estrada Jr. and Eterno) defeated Los Mariachis Locos (El Diablo Jr. and El Hijo del Diablo)	Best two-out-of-three falls tag team match
4	Emperador Azteca, El Hijo de Mascara Sagrada, and El Hijo del Alebrije defeated Canis Lupus, Halloween Jr., and Tony Rivera by disqualification	Best two-out-of-three falls six-man "Lucha Libre rules" tag team match
5	La Famila de Tijuana (Damián 666, Halloween, and X-Fly) defeated Argos, Crazy Boy, and Danny Casas	Best two-out-of-three falls six-man "Lucha Libre rules" tag team match
