= Electroshock (wrestler) =

Mexican professional wrestler

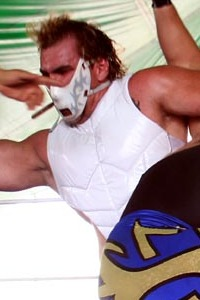
- Electroshock in 2005

Personal information
- Born: Edgar Luna Pozos; April 22, 1970 (age 56) Torreón, Coahuila, Mexico

Professional wrestling career
- Ring name(s): Electro; Electroshock; Mr. Elektro/Mr. Electro; Skitzofrenia; Ultimatum
- Billed height: 1.88 m (6 ft 2 in)
- Billed weight: 119 kg (262 lb)
- Trained by: Águila Blanca; El Norteño; Arturo Beristain
- Debut: January 2, 1992

Edgar Luna Pozos (born April 22, 1970) is a Mexican professional wrestler and former mixed martial artist. He best known under the ring name Electroshock, which he has used while working for the Mexican professional wrestling promotion Asistencia Asesoría y Administración (AAA) since 1997. Pozos is married to luchadora Lady Apache and is the brother of Luchador Charly Manson. As Electroshock Pozos has been a member of the groups Los Vipers, La Legión Extranjera and Los Wagnermaniacos. He is the winner of the 2009 Rey de Reyes ("King of Kings") tournament and a one-time AAA Mega Champion.

== Early life ==
Edgar Pozos was born in Torreón, Coahuila, Mexico on April 22, 1970. After his younger brother Jesús was born in 1975 the family moved to Mexico City, Mexico, settling in the Tláhuac delegacion. Edgar Pozos was a quiet kid, focusing on school until he as a teenager saw a picture of Arnold Schwarzenegger in a gym in Mexico City, which inspired him begin bodybuilding. He was also a big fan of wrestling, with their father being a wrestling trainer the Pozos boys often attended wrestling matches as the Toreo de Cuatro Caminos, one of the most popular wrestling venues in the early 1980s. Pozos combined his bodybuilding training with wrestling, hoping to become a professional wrestler one day. In order to get a wrestlers license from the Mexican Boxing and Wrestling commission he had to wrestle a tryout match, he faced Axel in his tryout match and wrestled well enough to get a license.

== Professional wrestling career ==
=== Consejo Mundial de Lucha libre (1992-1997) ===
After getting his license Pozos created the enmascarado (masked) character "Ultimatum" after seeing a band called "Ultimatum" and discovering that the term meant "final warning", a name he found appropriate for the showmanship of professional wrestling. As Ultimatum he earned a contract with Consejo Mundial de Lucha Libre (CMLL) and began working at their wrestling school to hone his skills under the tutelage of Arturo Beristain. As Ultimatum Pozos worked low card matches on various CMLL shows, not rising about the first or second match even after almost five years with the company. He was unable to talk to CMLL owner Paco Alonso, but when he talked with CMLL booker Juan Mar Manuel he told him flat out that CMLL had no plans to give him a higher profile on the shows, after which Pozos left the company.

=== Asistencia Asesoría y Administración ===
Almost ready to quit wrestling Pozos friend José Mercado, who wrestles as Pentagón Black, convinced him to apply for a job with Asistencia Asesoría y Administración (AAA). In the AAA offices he met AAA owner Antonio Peña, who remembered Pozos from the time Peña worked for CMLL. Peña gave Pozos a job with AAA and together they came up with a new character to replace "Ultimatum". Pozos was inspired by the Hannibal Lecter character from the movie Silence of the Lambs and had turned an ice hockey Goaltender's mask into a mouthguard like the one Lecter wore in the movie. Peña commented that the mask made Pozos look like a mad man and asked "How do you deal with madmen?" and answered "Electroshock therapy", giving the name "Electroshock" to Pozos new character. Electroshock made his in-ring debut in September 1997.

==== Los Vipers (1997–2006) ====
Electroshock was quickly made part of a group called Los Vipers, a Rudo (Heel or "bad guy") group led by Cibernético and that besides Electroshock consisted of Abismo Negro, Psicosis II, Histeria, Mosco de la Merced and Maniaco. The group soon became the top "rudo" group in AAA, bolstered by several title wins, including Electroshock and Abismo Negro teaming up to defeat Perro Aguayo and Perro Aguayo, Jr. for the Mexican National Tag Team Championship on May 2, 1999. In late 1999 Los Vipers began fighting amongst themselves with Abismo Negro making a bid to take control of the group. This led to Abismo Negro breaking away to form Los Vipers Extreme along with Electroshock, Pentagón, Shiiba, Cuervo and Mini Abismo Negro. On November 7, 1999 Electroshock and Abismo Negro lost the National Tag Team title to Hator and the Panther. the Los Vipers factions joined back up in early 2000 without much resolution to the tension between Abismo Negro and Cibernético. The unity allowed Electroshock and Abismo Negro to focus on regaining the titles, a feat they accomplished on May 7, 2000 defeating Hator and the Panther. The team only held onto the title for 63 days before losing the belts to the duo of Perro Aguayo, Jr. and Héctor Garza.

In the fall of 2000 Electroshock travelled to Japan to work for Michinoku Pro Wrestling, specifically to participate in their 2000 Futaritabi Tag Team League tournament. Electroshock teamed up with Pentagón to earn 9 points in the tournament, tying for first with Tiger Mask and Gran Hamada. The Mexican team lost to Tiger Mask and Hamada in the finals on November 3, 2000- Back in Mexico Cibernético created a new "super faction" in AAA called Lucha Libre Latina (LLL), a faction that included Los Vipers as well as several other Rudos. Over the following couple of years Electroshock separated himself from the other Los Vipers members, choosing to team more often with his brother who worked for AAA under the name Charly Manson. On June 8, 2001 Electroshock defeated Heavy Metal to win the UWA World Light Heavyweight Championship, a title he would hold for four to five months. On June 15, 2001 Electroshock defeated Héctor Garza to win the Mexican National Light Heavyweight Championship, a title he would hold and defend for the next 310 days until losing it to Perro Aguayo, Jr. Electroshock won the Mexican National Tag Team Title for the third time when he teamed with Chessman to defeat La Parka, Jr. and Máscara Sagrada for the title. The two teamed together, representing AAA for 427 days before losing the title back to La Parka, Jr. and Máscara Sagrada. Following the title match Electroshock and Chessman had a falling out, starting a storyline between the two that would soon involve Electroshock's wife Lady Apache and Chessman's storyline girlfriend Tiffany. The storyline between the two mixed teams was the driving force behind the creation of a new championship, the AAA World Mixed Tag Team Championship. On June 15, 2003 as part of Triplemania XI Electroshock and Lady Apache defeated Chessman and Tiffany, Gran Apache and Faby Apache and El Brazo and Martha Villalobos in a four-way match to become the inaugural Mixed Tag Team Champions. The team held the title until September 16, 2003 when Chessman and Tiffany won the belts from them. The storyline between the two couples came to its conclusion at the 2004 Rey de Reyes event where the two teams faced off in a Parejas Suicida where the losing team would be forced to wrestle each other under Luchas de Apuestas (Bet match) rules. Electroshock and Lady Apache lost and Electroshock subsequently pinned Lady Apache in their match. After the match Electroshock apologized for pinning his wife, then had his hair shaved off instead of forcing Lady Apache to be shaved bald. Following the storyline with Chessman, Electroshock began a storyline with his own brother, publicly acknowledging that they were brothers for the first time. The two faced off in a singles match at Triplemania XII where the loser would be forced to retire. Manson won the match but Lady Apache pleaded with him to not force Electroshock to retire but instead shave her hair off as "payment". After some consideration Manson accepted and shaved her hair off, with Electo Shock voluntarily shaving his own hair off in sympathy. In 2006 Electroshock briefly left AAA and wrestled for CMLL as "Electro" but returned to AAA after only a few matches with CMLL.

==== La Legión Extranjera (2007–2009) ====
Following his brief departure from AAA Electroshock became part of Konnan's La Legión Extranjera, feuding with a group of AAA Loyalists. In 2006 Charly Manson, Chessman and Cibernético turned tecnico (Face or "good guys") and formed a group called Los Hell Brothers. At the first ever Antonio Peña Memorial Show Electroshock, Abismo Negro and El Zorro defeated Chessman, Cibernético and El Intocable in the main event. La Legión's success continued as Electroshock, Bobby Lashley and Kenzo Suzuki defeated Chessman, La Parka and Silver King in one of the featured events. At the 2008 Antonio Peña Memorial Show Konnan, Electroshock, Rellik and Kenzo Suzuki defeated "Team AAA" (Latin Lover, Octagón, La Parka and Super Fly) in a Steel cage elimination match where La Legión won control of AAA (in storyline terms). In the following months Electroshock was featured more through the "Takeover storyline", an exposure that also led to him qualifying for the 2009 Rey de Reyes tournament. Electroshock outlasted Octagón, Super Fly and Nicho "El Millionaire" to qualify for the final and outlasted La Parka, Silver King and Latin Lover to become the 2009 Rey de Reyes. The long running "AAA vs. La Legión" storyline came to an end at Triplemania XVII where La Legión (Electroshock, Silver King, Chessman, Kenzo Suzuki and Teddy Hart) faced and lost to "Team AAA" (El Hijo del Santo, La Parka, Vampiro, Octagón and Jack Evans) in a Steel Cage match with control of AAA on the line. After the loss Konnan was fired by AAA owner Joaquin Roldan and La Legión was disbanded.

==== Los Wagnermaniacos (2009–2010) ====
Following Dr. Wagner, Jr.'s AAA Mega Championship victory at Triplemania XVII, a group composed of Dr. Wagner, Jr., Silver King, Último Gladiador and Electroshock formed, taking the name Los Wagnermaniacos after the group leader Dr. Wagner, Jr.. At the 2009 Verano de Escandalo event Electroshock, Silver King and Último Gladiador teamed up to defeat La Parka, Marco Corleone and Octagón. At Heroes Inmortales III Charly Manson was scheduled to face Chessman in a Lucha de Apuesta match, but in the days leading up to the event Manson decided to leave AAA, leaving the main event of Heroes Inmortales III up in the air. On the night of the show Electroshock came out to take his brother's place in the match, losing to Chessman. After the match he had his head shaved completely bald, taking the loss that his brother was originally scheduled to take. At the 2009 Guerra de Titanes Los Wagnermaniacos lost to El Elegido, Extreme Tiger and Pimpinela Escarlata while Dr. Wagner, Jr. lost the AAA title to El Mesias. In early 2010 Electroshock stated that since he was the 2009 Rey de Reyes he deserved to take part in the title match with El Mesias scheduled for the 2010 Rey de Reyes event, a comment that led to animosity between Electroshock and Dr. Wagner, Jr. On March 12, 2010 Electroshock submitted Mr. Anderson in the main event of the 2010 Rey de Reyes, thus winning the AAA Mega Championship without actually defeating the champion El Mesias. Following the match Dr. Wagner, Jr. and the other Wagnermaniacos came to the ring to congratulate Electroshock, seemingly ending any concerns about animosity in the group. On a subsequent AAA show Dr. Wagner, Jr. asked Electroshock for a title match, a request Electroshock declined leading to a fight between the two, ending Electroshock's association with Los Wagnermaniacos.

==== Los Maniacos (2010) ====
At a later show Silver King, Dr. Wagner, Jr.'s brother, interfered in a fight between the two by attacking his brother, siding with Electroshock. Silver King stated that he chose friendship over family and was siding with Electroshock in the storyline. The two, along with Último Gladiador became known as Los Maniacos Dr. Wagner, Jr. after turning técnico continued Los Wagnermaniacos with Pimpinela Escarlata and Octagón to even the numbers. On April 26, 2010 AAA confirmed on their website that Electroshock would defend the title against Dr. Wagner, Jr. In the lead up to the title match the two faced off in a Steel Cage match on May 19, 2010, a match that Electroshock won with the help of Los Maniacos, Silver King and Último Gladiador. On June 6, 2010, at Triplemanía XVIII, Electroshock lost the AAA Mega Championship to Dr. Wagner, Jr. After losing the title, Electroshock began feuding with Heavy Metal. In September 2010 Silver King and Último Gladiador announced they were joining La Sociedad, and although Electroshock made no official announcement on whether or not he would be following them, he agreed to represent the group at Héroes Inmortales IV in order to get his hands on Heavy Metal. At the event Electroshock, El Zorro, Hernandez and L.A. Park were defeated by Heavy Metal, La Parka, Dark Ozz and Dark Cuervo in an elimination steel cage match.

==== Turning technico (2010–2014) ====
On November 14 Electroshock officially announced that he was not part of La Sociedad and urged Silver King and Último Gladiador to leave the group. At the November 18 event in Naucalpan he once again turned down an offer to join La Sociedad and was as a result beaten down by Silver King, Último Gladiador and La Milicia, turning him technico in the process. When Heavy Metal returned from his injury on February 4, 2011, he and Electroshock entered a Best of Five series, with the loser having his hair shaved off. The fifth match, a Two Out of Three Falls Bull Terrier match, took place on March 18 at Rey de Reyes, where Heavy Metal was victorious after a guitar shot. After the match both Electroshock and Heavy Metal were attacked by members of La Sociedad, bringing the former rivals together to fight a common enemy. On June 18 at Triplemanía XIX, Electroshock, Heavy Metal and Joe Líder defeated Silver King, Último Gladiador and Chessman in a Tables, Ladders and Chairs match. On October 9 at Héroes Inmortales, Electroshock defeated eight other men to win the Copa Antonio Peña. On August 5, 2012, at Triplemanía XX, Electroshock teamed up with L.A. Park as Team Joaquín Roldán in a Hair vs. Hair match, where they faced Team Dorian Roldán (Jeff Jarrett and Kurt Angle), with the Roldáns' hairs on the line. Electroshock won the match for his team by pinning Angle, forcing Dorian to have his head shaved bald. However, after the match, the rudos overpowered the technicos and shaved Joaquín bald. On December 8, 2013, at Guerra de Titanes, Electroshock received his first shot at the AAA Latin American Championship, but was unable to dethrone the defending champion, Blue Demon, Jr. On August 17, 2014, at Triplemanía XXII, Electroshock lost his hair to fellow técnico El Mesías in a six-way steel cage Lucha de Apuestas.

==== Holocausto (2015) ====
After losing his hair to El Mesías, Electroshock entered a storyline, where he began teasing retirement from professional wrestling. However, on January 23, 2015, Electroshock instead turned rudo and formed a new partnership with El Hijo de Pirata Morgan. Electroshock's new stable was later named Holocausto. On May 2, 2016, Electroshock left AAA.

=== Independent circuit (2016–present) ===
Following his departure from AAA, Pozos adopted the new ring name "Mr. Elektro" or "Mr. Electro" due to his old ring name being owned by AAA. On June 12, 2016 Mr. Electro defeated Máscara Año 2000 Jr. by disqualification, thus winning the IWRG Intercontinental Heavyweight Championship in the process as IWRG rules state a championship changes hands on a disqualification.

=== Return to AAA (2018) ===
On June 26 at the press conference, Electroshock makes his return to the AAA company representing himself as part of the Elite League. On July 21, 2018, at AAA vs. Elite, Electroshock teams with L.A. Park and Puma King as representatives of Liga Elite defeating the Team AAA (Psycho Clown, El Hijo del Fantasma and Rey Wagner).

== Championships and accomplishments ==
- Asistencia Asesoría y Administración
  - AAA Mega Championship (1 time)
  - AAA World Mixed Tag Team Championship (1 time, inaugural) – with Lady Apache
  - Mexican National Light Heavyweight Championship (1 time)
  - Mexican National Tag Team Championship (3 times) – with Abismo Negro (2), Chessman (1)
  - Copa Antonio Peña (2011)
  - Rey de Reyes (2009)
  - UWA World Light Heavyweight Championship (1 time) (Note: The UWA closed in 1995 but some of the UWA Championships remained active after this period. Electroshock held the UWA Light Heavyweight title in a period where AAA recognized and promoted the title, thus it's listed under AAA, not UWA)
- Federation of Radio and Television Associations
  - Golden Microphone (2012)
- International Wrestling Revolution Group

- IWRG Intercontinental Heavyweight Championship (2 times)

- Pro Wrestling Illustrated
  - PWI ranked him #57 of the top 500 singles wrestlers in the PWI 500 in 2010

== Luchas de Apuestas record ==
Winner (wager)	Loser (wager)	Location	Event	Date	Notes
Electroshock (hair)	Danny Boy (hair)	Tlalnepantla, State of Mexico	Live event	November 30, 1997	
Tiffany (hair)	Electroshock (hair)	Naucalpan, State of Mexico	Rey de Reyes	March 21, 2004	(Note: The match was Lady Apache and Electroshock vs. Chessman and Tiffany, Lady Apache was pinned but Electroshock offered his hair instead.)
Chessman (hair)	Electroshock (hair)	Nuevo Laredo, Tamaulipas	Live event	September 1, 2008	
Chessman (hair)	Electroshock (hair)	Monterrey, Nuevo León	Live event	September 26, 2009	
Heavy Metal (hair)	Electroshock (hair)	Aguascalientes, Mexico	Rey de Reyes	March 18, 2011	(Note: Two Out of Three Falls Bull Terrier match; Match #5 in a Best of Five series.)
El Mesías (hair)	Electroshock (hair)	Mexico City	Triplemanía XXII	August 17, 2014	(Note: Steel cage match, also involving Averno, Blue Demon, Jr., Chessman and La Parka.)
Máscara Año 2000 Jr. (hair)	Mr. Elektro (hair)	Naucalpan, State of Mexico	Cabellera vs. Cabellera	July 17, 2016	
Ray Mendoza Jr. (hair)	Mr. Elektro (hair)	Naucalpan, State of Mexico	55th Anniversary of Lucha Libre in Estado de México	December 3, 2017	

== Mixed martial arts record ==
Professional record breakdown
9 matches	4 wins	5 losses
By knockout	0	2
By submission	4	3

Res.	Record	Opponent	Method	Event	Date	Round	Time	Location	Notes
Win	4–5	Jack Lancer	Submission (armbar)	Cage of Combat 3: San Vale Tudo	February 13, 2010	1	1:47	Torreón, Mexico	
Win	3–5	Nestor Martinez	Submission (armbar)	Cage of Combat 2: Battleground	January 23, 2010	2	2:02	Toluca, Mexico	
Loss	2–5	Hajime Ohara	Submission (guillotine choke)	Cage of Combat 1	December 26, 2009	1	2:04	Veracruz, Mexico	
Loss	2–4	Joe Atoe	KO	MMA Extreme 17	December 15, 2007	1	2:10	Honduras	
Loss	2–3	Abdias Irisson	KO	MMA Extreme 14	October 13, 2007	1	1:02	Honduras	
Win	2–2	Arthur Bart	Submission (armbar)	MMA Extreme 10	February 3, 2007	2	2:02	Santo Domingo, Dominican Republic	
Loss	1–2	Mazada Matsuki	Submission (guillotine choke)	MMA Extreme 8	February 3, 2007	3	0:00	Santo Domingo, Dominican Republic	
Win	1–1	Tomas Alvarado	Submission (guillotine choke)	Vallarta Extremo 1	March 25, 2006	1	2:10	Mexico	
Loss	0–1	Hikaru Sato	Submission (heel hook)	Deep: 9th Impact	May 5, 2003	2	0:57	Tokyo, Japan	
