= Las Tortugas Ninja =

Professional wrestling stable

Stable
- Members: Mike; Rafy; Leo (II)
- Former members: Leo (I); Teelo
- Debut: October 5, 2014
- Years active: 2014–present

Las Tortugas Ninja (Spanish for "The Ninja Turtles") is a Mexican lucha libre (professional wrestling) técnico, those that portray the "good guys", group also known as a stable, currently working for International Wrestling Revolution Group (IWRG). The group was created in late 2014 when IWRG gave four of their wrestlers ring characters based on the Teenage Mutant Ninja Turtles characters. Initially the group consisted of Leo (based on Leonardo), Mike (Michelangelo), Rafy (Raphael) and Teelo (Donatello).

In 2015 the wrestler who portrayed the "Leo" character was replaced and in 2018 Teelo left the group to form a rival faction known as Las Tortugas Negras ("The Black Turtles"; Teelo, Ra-Zhata, and Shil-Kah). Collectively Leo (II), Mike and Rafy held the Distrito Federal Trios Championship for 297 days in 2016–2017. With the Tortugas Ninja being masked wrestlers their real names have not been revealed, although it has been confirmed that wrestler Látigo played the original Leo and that Teelo formerly worked under the ring names Anubis Black and Bello Kaligula.

== History ==
In the fall of 2014 International Wrestling Revolution Group (IWRG) introduced a new group of masked wrestlers, collectively known as "Las Tortugas Ninja" ("The Ninja Turtles"). Los Tortugas Ninja consisted of four luchadors dressing like the members of the Teenage Mutant Ninja Turtles (TMNT) cartoon/comic book. The group consisted of Leo (blue mask; based on Leonardo), Mike (orange mask; Michelangelo), Rafy (ref mask; Raphael) and Teelo (purple mask; Donatello). The group made their in-ring debut on October 4, 2014 when they defeated Oficial 911, Canis Lupus, Eterno and Hip Hop Man. Three weeks later Leo and Rafy challenged Oficial 911 and Oficial AK-47 for the IWRG Intercontinental Tag Team Championship, the first championship match for Las Tortugas Ninja, which they lost by disqualification.

Early in their career, Los Tortugas were accompanied by a Mini-Estrella dressed up as the TNMT character Master Splinter. Early in 2015, the Alianza Universal de Lucha Libre (AULL) affiliated "Los Tortuguillos Karaketas" group, a similarly themed TMNT group made up of the wrestlers Donatello, Leonardo, Miguel Angel, and Rafael, began a storyline feud with the IWRG Tortugas Ninja. During the first match between the two turtle factions a third group of TNMT inspired wrestlers, Los Tortugas Mutantes, ran in and attacked both groups to set up a three-way storyline between the two. Los Tortuga Mutantes never actually wrestled either of the other two turtle teams as they lost their masks to "Los Simpsons" (Homero, Bart and Lisa). On April 1 Los Tortuguillos Karatekas defeated Los Tortugas Ninja on a Universal Wrestling Entertainment (UWA) show, followed by Los Tortugas Ninja finally defeating Los Tortuguillos Karatekas on May 5 of that year as part of IWRG's annual Festival de las Máscaras show to end the turtle related rivalry. On July 12, 2015 Leo, Rafy and Teelo unsuccessfully challenged Los Terribles Cerebros (Black Terry, Cerebro Negro and Dr. Cerebro) for the Distrito Federal Trios Championship as they lost the match two falls to one. In the fall of 2015 Rafy became the first Tortuga Ninja to put his mask on the line as he was one of 10 men to put their mask on the line in the 2015 version of El Castillo del Terror ("The Tower of Terror"). Rafy escaped the steel cage match about halfway through, leaving Golden Magic to defeat El Golpeador at the end of the match.

=== Leo replaced ===
The 2015 El Castillo del Terror show also marked the last time the wrestler portraying Leo worked under that name, opting to going back to his former name, Latigo, to work on the independent circuit instead of for IWRG. A week later a different wrestler began working as "Leo", with Leo, Rafy and Mike losing to the former Leo, Latigo and his partners Centvrion and Fly Warrior. On May 1, 2016 Leo, Rafy and Mike defeated Los Mariachis Locos (El Hijo del Diablo, El Diablo Jr. and Imposible) to win the Distrito Federal Trios Championship. Following their championship win Las Tortugas Ninja proceeded to successfully defend the championship several times, including successful defenses against Los Comandos Elite (Oficial Factor, Oficial Rayan and Oficial Spector), and Los Insoportables (Apolo Estrada Jr., Eterno and Relampago). Their highest profile championship defense came at the 2016 El Castillo del Terror show where they defeated Los Inferno Rockers (Devil Rocker, Machine Rocker and Soul Rocker (Note: Not the same Los Inferno Rockers that worked in Lucha Libre AAA Worldwide)). At the same show Teelo risked his mask in the main event 10-man steel cage match, but escaped the cage to keep his mask safe as Zatura lost and was unmasked. Los Tortugas had one more successful defends against Los Oficiales (AK-47 and Fierro) and Cerebro Negro, before losing the championship to Los Exóticos (Diva Salvaje, Demasiado, Nigma) on February 22, 2017. On April 15, 2018 both Mike and Teelo were involved in the 2018 Guerra del Golfo event, with each of them losing a steel cage match earlier in the show. As a result, the two Tortugas were forced to wrestle each other with their masks on the line in the main event. While reluctant to fight each other in the end Mike pinned Teelo, forcing Teelo to unmask. After unmasking Teelo revealed that his real name was Mario Rodolfo Martínez Sánchez, which also revealed that he had previously wrestled under the masked identifies of "Anubis Black" and "Bello Kaligula" in IWRG.

=== Las Tortugas Negras ===
In the weeks following Tortuga Teelo's unmasking, he turned on the other three members of Las Tortugas Ninja, switching to a darker rudo character. He also introduced two "Evil Turtles", named Ra-Zhata and Shil-Kah, who wore black and gray versions of the turtle suits that Las Tortugas Ninja wore, that trio would eventually be named "Las Tortugas Negras" and were positioned as rivals of Leo, Mike and Rafy. The trio defeated Leo, Mike and Rafy in their debut match on July 15, 2018. On July 22, 2018 Los Tortugas participated in IWRG's second ever Zona de Ejecucion ("Elimination Zone") tournament, but lost to the team of Trauma I, Trauma II, El Hijo del Medico Asesino and Eterno. During the late summer/early fall Teelo began a short lived feud with Chico Che, leading to Chich Che defeating Teelo in a Lucha de Apuestas at the 2018 Caravana de Campeones show, leaving the Tortuga Nega bald as a result. On November 1 Mike and Shil-Kah were both involved in the El Castillo del Terror ("The Tower of Terror") match, with both wrestlers putting their masks on the line alongside 10 other wrestlers. In the end Mike defeated Oficial Spartan to unmask him. Shil-Kah escaped the cage earlier in the match to keep his mask safe.

== Ninja Turtles in Lucha Libre ==
The popular Teenage Mutant Ninja Turtles franchise has inspired several lucha libre groups prior to the IWRG Las Tortugas Ninja. The earliest example of this was in 1990 where Empresa Mexicana de Lucha Libre (EMLL) created a group of four masked wrestlers known as "Los Tortuga Ninja" with the individual members simply being referred to as "Tortuga Ninja I", II, III and IV. The group lost their masks to "Trio Fantasia" (Super Muñeco, Super Raton and Super Pinoco) and Coliseo 2000 on December 2, 1990. The group would later work for the Universal Wrestling Association where they used the ring names Migue Ángel, Donatello, Raphael and Leonardo. The last documented match for the team was in June 1991.

The second TMNT inspired group was introduced by Asistencia Asesoria y Administracion (AAA) in 1992, known as "Los Tortuguillos Karatekas" ("The Little Karate Turtles"), again simply numbered I, II, III and IV. These turtles were wrestlers Rocky Santana, Robin Hood, El Gallego and Danny Boy portraying the characters between 1992 and 1994. The characters were brought back as a trio in 2005, but it is uncertain if these three turtles were portrayed by the same wrestlers, or someone else under the mask. The 2005 version of Los Tortuguillos Karatekas were positioned as the rivals of a trio known as "Los Tortugas Mutante" ("The Mutant Turtles"; I, II and III), another group inspired by the TNMT franchise. The Tortuga Mutante characters were used in 2005/2006 and then brought back for a Lucha de Apuestas match on December 25, 2015 where they lost to "Los Simpsons" (Homero, Bart and LIsa) and were forced to unmask.

== Championships and accomplishments ==
- International Wrestling Revolution Group

- Distrito Federal Trios Championship (1 time) – Leo, Mike and Rafy

== Luchas de Apuestas record ==
Winner (wager)	Loser (wager)	Location	Event	Date	Notes
Tortuga Mike (mask)	Tortuga Teelo (mask)	Naucalpan, Mexico State	Guerra del Golfo	April 15, 2018	(Note: Both lost a steel cage match earlier on the show and were forced to wrestle each other.)
Chico Che (hair)	Tortuga Teelo (hair)	Naucalpan, Mexico State	Caravana de Campeones	September 9, 2018	
Tortuga Mike (mask)	Oficial Spector (mask)	Naucalpan, Mexico State	El Castillo del Terror	November 1, 2018	(Note: Last two competitors in a steel cage match that also included Aramís, Diosa Atenea, Dragón Bane, El Hijo del Alebrije, El Hijo de Canis Lupus, Relámpago, Ludark Shaitan, Shil-Kah, Tortuga Leo and Zumbi.)
Metaleón (mask)	Tortuga Mike (mask)	Naucalpan, Mexico State	Guerra del Golfo	April 7, 2019	
