= Los Traumas =

Professional wrestling tag team

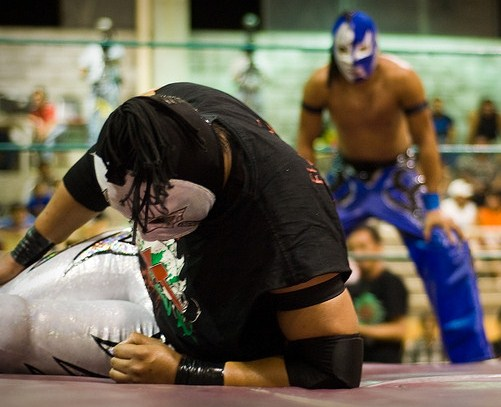
- Trauma I facing Trauma II during a match

Tag team
- Members: Trauma I Trauma II
- Name(s): Las Traumas; Las Hermano Trauma
- Billed heights: Trauma I 1.77 m (5 ft 9 1/2 in); Trauma II 1.75 m (5 ft 9 in)
- Combined billed weight: 160 kg (350 lb)
- Debut: 2002

Los Traumas or Los Hermanos Trauma (Spanish for "The Trauma Brothers") is the name of a Mexican professional wrestling tag team consisting of the enmascarado (masked) brothers Trauma I and Trauma II. Los Traumas' real names are not a matter of public record, as is often the case with masked wrestlers in Mexico where their private lives are kept a secret from the wrestling fans. Los Traumas are the sons of professional wrestler Miguel Calderón Navarro, better known under the ring name Negro Navarro. The team operates on a Freelance basis and thus is not exclusively working for one specific professional wrestling promotion but has worked for many Mexican wrestling promotions including working matches on shows promoted by the largest Mexican based promotions such as Lucha Libre AAA World Wide (AAA), Consejo Mundial de Lucha Libre (CMLL) and International Wrestling Revolution Group (IWRG).

== Team history ==
The sons of Miguel Calderón Navarro both made their professional wrestling debut in 2002, adopting the enmascarado (masked) characters Trauma I and Trauma II, collectively the tag team became known as Los Traumas or Los Hermano Trauma ("The Trauma Brothers"). Early on the duo mainly competed in and around Mexico City on the Mexican independent circuit, including working regularly for the Desastre Total Ultraviolento (DTU) and NWA Mexico professional wrestling promotions. The team often appeared on the same shows as their father, who also worked as a Freelance wrestler on the independent circuit. Around 2007 Los Traumas began making appearances for International Wrestling Revolution Group (IWRG) and would make regular appearances for IWRG both as a team and singles wrestlers. When one or both Traumas teamed up with their father they were billed as La Dinastia de la Muerte ("The Dynasty of Death"), referring both to the fact that they are a family (a "dynasty") and also referring to Los Misioneros de la Muerte, a trio Negro Navarro formed with El Signo and El Texano in the 1980s. In IWRG the team had a long-running storyline feud against Los Terribles Cerebros (Black Terry, Cerebro Negro and Dr. Cerebro) centering on Los Cerebros' Distrito Federal Trios Championship. Los Traumas also worked a number of Toryumon Mexico shows, giving them the opportunity to work with and against a number of wrestlers from Consejo Mundial de Lucha Libre (CMLL), Mexico's largest and the world's oldest wrestling promotion including a match against one of CMLL's top teams, Los Guerreros del Infierno (Rey Bucanero and Último Guerrero) as part of the 2010 Yamaha Cup tournament. Los Traumas and Navarro competed in the 2010 tournament for the vacant Distrito Federal Trios Championship, but lost in the first round to the team of Black Terry, Dr. Cerebro and El Hijo del Signo. Los Traumas were one of eight teams in a tournament to determine the first International Wrestling League (IWL) Tag Team Champions. In the first round they defeated the teams of Aeroboy and Violento Jack, Heddi Karaoui and Naruto, Pesadilla and Radge but lost to Los Compadres (Chucho el Roto and Iron Love). On March 5, 2011 Los Traumas officially worked a match for CMLL, participating in CMLL's card for the Festival Mundial de Lucha Libre (the "World Wrestling Festival") where they teamed up with Dr. Cerebro only to lose to CMLL contracted wrestlers Puma King, Tiger Kid and Virus. On May 15, 2011 Los Traumas defeated independent circuit rivals Los Compadres to win the AULL Tag Team Championship, the first major championship the brothers won as a duo. On December 22, 2011, as a part of IWRG's celebration of the Arena Naucalpan 34th Anniversary, Los Traumas found themselves on opposite sides of a Relevos Suicidas match, where the two members of the losing team would be forced to wrestle under Luchas de Apuestas rules. Trauma I teamed up with Oficial AK-47 as they lost to Trauma II and Oficial 911. In the subsequent Luchas de Apuestas match Trauma I defeated AK-47, forcing him to unmask as per lucha libre traditions. On April 14, 2012 Los Traumas lost the AULL Tag Team Championship to Los Bastardos (Epitafio & Leviathan) on an AULL show in Tlalnepantla de Baz, State of Mexico. On April 29, Los Traumas with Angélico won the Triangular de Tercias, defeating Eterno, Factor and Spartan in the final. On November 3, 2012 Los Traumas defeated Astro de Plata and Freelance on an AAA promoted show, marking the first time Los Traumas worked for Mexico's other major wrestling promotion. On March 31, 2013 Los Traumas competed in IWRG's La Guerra de Familias ("War of the Families") tournament. The team defeated La Familia de Tijuana (Mosco X-Fly and Eterno) in the first round. During the match Trauma I reaggravated an old knee injury and was not allowed to compete in the finals where Trauma II lost to Hijo de Máscara Año 2000 and Cien Caras, Jr. Following the loss Los Junior Dinamitas challenged Trauma I and Negro Navarro to defend their title a week later. A week later Los Junior Dinamitas wrestled Trauma I and Negro Navarro for the IWRG Intercontinental Tag Team Championship, but lost. On August 9, 2015 Los Traumas and Negro Navarro won the IWRG Intercontinental Trios Championship from Los Piratas (Pirata Mogan, Pirata Morgan Jr. and El Hijo de Pirata Mogan).

== In other media ==
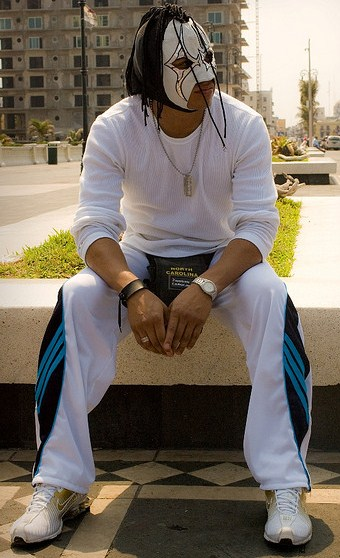
Trauma I, wearing his mask in public

The Trauma brothers have designed and sell their own line of line of T-shirts and sweatshirts manufactured by SidZero. The line of clothes was inspired by their ring looks and have been described as having the aesthetics of Slipknot combined with zombie movie posters. In 2012 the World Press Photo organization, based in Amsterdam, the Netherlands selected photographs of Los Traumas taken by polish photographer Tomasz Gudzowaty as the third-place winner in their sports category. The images were taken on June 15, 2011 before and during a wrestling event in Mexico City and featured black and white photos of Los Traumas wearing their trademark "horror-inspired" masks.

== Championships and accomplishments ==
- Alianza Universal de Lucha Libre
  - AULL Tag Team Championship (1 time)
- International Wrestling Revolution Group
  - IWRG Intercontinental Tag Team Championship (1 time)
  - IWRG Intercontinental Trios Championship (1 time) – with Negro Navarro
  - Triangular de Tercias (2012)
- The Crash Lucha Libre

- The Crash Tag Team Championship (1 time)
