= El Castillo del Terror (2003) =

2003 International Wrestling Revolution Group event

- Promotion: International Wrestling Revolution Group
- Date: November 2, 2003
- City: Naucalpan, State of Mexico
- Venue: Arena Naucalpan

Event chronology
← Previous; Copa Higher Power	Next → Arena Naucalpan 26th Anniversary Show

IWRG El Castillo del Terror chronology
← Previous; 2002	Next → 2004

The 2003 El Castillo del Terror (Spanish for "The Tower of Terror") was a major lucha libre event produced and scripted by the Mexican International Wrestling Revolution Group (IWRG) professional wrestling promotion on November 2, 2003. The 2003 El Castillo del Terror was the third ever IWRG El Castillo del Terror event held. The main event was the eponymous Castillo del Terror (Spanish for "Tower of Terror") Steel cage match where the last person eliminated would be forced to take off his wrestling mask or have his hair shaved off as a result of the loss.

Due to incomplete records of the show, the only known results state that Mega was listed as the winner of the El Castillo del Terror main event while Comando Alfa lost the match and thus had to unmask and state his given name. The remaining results are unknown.

== Production ==
=== Background ===
The Mexican wrestling promotion International Wrestling Revolution Group (IWRG; Sometimes referred to as Grupo Internacional Revolución in Spanish) has a long-standing history of holding major event focused on a multi-man steel cage match where the last wrestler left in the cage would be forced to either remove their wrestling mask or have their hair shaved off under Lucha de Apuestas, or "bet match", rules. Starting in the year 2000 IWRG has promoted a fall show, around the Mexican Day of the Death, under the name El Castillo del Terror ("The Tower of Terror"), creating an annual event on their major show calendar that has been held almost every year since 2000. The 2003 El Castillo del Terror show was the third overall show under that name, with IWRG not holding a Castillo del Terror in 2001.

The El Castillo del Terror event is one of several annual steel cage match shows that IWRG holds throughout the year such as the IWRG Guerra del Golfo ("Gulf War"), IWRG Guerra de Sexos ("War of the Sexes"), or IWRG Prison Fatal ("Deadly Prison") shows. The Castillo del Terror shows, as well as the majority of the IWRG shows in general, are held in Arena Naucalpan, owned by the promoters of IWRG and their main arena. In the El Castillo del Terror match a varying number of wrestlers start out in the cage and have to remain inside the cage, fighting each other for ten minutes before they are allowed to try to escape the match. Wrestlers who climb over the top of the steel cage and touch the floor with both feet are deemed to have escaped the cage and thus escaped the Lucha de Apuestas, or "bet match", stipulation. The last wrestler in the cage is forced to either unmask (if masked) and state his given name, or (if unmasked) is forced to have all his hair shaved off as per lucha libre traditions.

=== Storylines ===
The event featured an unknown number of professional wrestling matches with different wrestlers involved in pre-existing scripted feuds, plots and storylines. Wrestlers were portrayed as either heels (referred to as rudos in Mexico, those that portray the "bad guys") or faces (técnicos in Mexico, the "good guy" characters) as they followed a series of tension-building events, which culminated in a wrestling match or series of matches.

In 1999 IWRG introduced Mega and Super Mega, a team called Los Megas, a group of masked, brightly colored kid-friendly tecnico characters. They later added Ultra Mega to the group, making them a regular trio. At the very first El Castillo del Terror event Super Mega lost his mask, but the trio remained together. Los Megas defeated Los Oficiales (Guardia, Oficial and Vigilante) on August 2, 2001 to win the Distrito Federal Trios Championship, starting off a 161-day-long title reign. The trio was defeated for the title by Dr. Cerebro, Cirujano and Paramedico on January 10, 2002. Only a month later Mega and Ultra Mega defeated Fantasy and Star Boy to win the IWRG Intercontinental Tag Team Championship. They team held the title for 73 days until losing to MAZADA and NOZAWA. Around that time Super Mega left IWRG to work for Consejo Mundial de Lucha Libre, which caused IWRG to bring in Omega to keep Los Megas a trio.

In 2003 IWRG introduced a group designed to be the "archenemy" of Los Megas in the form of Los Comandos (Comando Alfa, Comando Mega and Comando Gama), who were dark and destructive to counter Los Megas' bright, kid-friendly personas. The groups developed their rivalry for the better part of a year, escalating the tension between the two groups.

== Event ==
Records are unclear on most of the wrestlers who actually participated in the main event, event results published shortly after the show only mention the Los Megas and Los Comandos factions, and later published sources only confirms the winner and the loser of the El Castillo del Terror match, offering no information on other matches on the show. Sources confirm the participation of Ultra Mega, Omega, Comando Mega and Comando Gama as well as Mega being declared the winner of the match, forcing Comando Alfa to unmask as a result.

== Aftermath ==
After the loss of his mask Los Comandos brought in "Comando Omega" as the faction rivalry continued to build. Los Comandos scored a major victory in the feud when Comando Gama defeated Omega in a Lucha de Apuestas match. Omega removed his mask and subsequently was only used sporadically. The storyline between the two factions saw Mega and Ultra Mega gain revenge and "win" the feud by defeating Comando Mega and Comando Gama in a Lucha de Apuesta, masks vs. masks match on June 6, 2004, a match that was considered the end of the Megas Vs Comandos storyline. Following the culmination of the feud Los Megas were phased out by IWRG. In October 2004 Mega and Black Dragon were the last two wrestlers in the 2004 Castillo del Terror steel cage match. Black Dragon won the match and Mega was forced to unmask and reveal his real name. On December 22, 2005, Ultra Mega was one of the participants in the 2005 El Castillo del Terror show. The match came down to Ultra Mega and Nemesis, with Nemesis winning the match, forcing Ultra Mega to unmask.

== Results ==
No.	Results	Stipulations
1	Mega defeated Comando Alfa; Also in the match: Ultra Mega, Omega, Comando Mega, Comando Gama and more	multi-man El Castillo del Terror Luchas de Apuestas, mask or hair match
