= El Castillo del Terror (December 2008) =

2008 International Wrestling Revolution Group event

- Promotion: International Wrestling Revolution Group
- Date: December 21, 2008
- City: Naucalpan, State of Mexico
- Venue: Arena Naucalpan

Event chronology
← Previous; El Castillo del Terror	Next → Guerra del Golfo

IWRG El Castillo del Terror chronology
← Previous; November 2008	Next → 2009

The December 2008 El Castillo del Terror (Spanish for "The Tower of Terror") was a major lucha libre event produced and scripted by the Mexican International Wrestling Revolution Group (IWRG) professional wrestling promotion on December 21, 2008. The El Castillo del Terror show was the ninth ever IWRG El Castillo del Terror event held and the second held in 2008, less than two months after the first 2008 El Castillo del Terror show. The main event was the eponymous Castillo del Terror (Spanish for "Tower of Terror") Steel cage match where the last person eliminated would be forced to take off his wrestling mask or have his hair shaved off as a result of the loss.

Arlequín was the last wrestler in the cage as Oficial 911 climbed over the top and out of the cage. As a result, Arlequín had all his hair shaved off, having lost his mask at the previous El Castillo del Terror event on November 2. The show featured four additional matches.

== Production ==
=== Background ===
The Mexican wrestling promotion International Wrestling Revolution Group (IWRG; Sometimes referred to as Grupo Internacional Revolución in Spanish) has a long-standing history of holding major event focused on a multi-man steel cage match where the last wrestler left in the cage would be forced to either remove their wrestling mask or have their hair shaved off under Lucha de Apuestas, or "bet match", rules. Starting in the year 20002005 IWRG has promoted a fall show, around the Mexican Day of the Death, under the name El Castillo del Terror ("The Tower of Terror"), creating an annual event on their major show calendar that has been held almost every year since 2000. The December 2008 El Castillo del Terror show was the ninth overall show under that name and the first year that IWRG decided to hold two El Castillo del Terror shows in the same year.

The El Castillo del Terror event is one of several annual steel cage match shows that IWRG holds throughout the year such as the IWRG Guerra del Golfo ("Gulf War"), IWRG Guerra de Sexos ("War of the Sexes"), or'IWRG Prisión Fatal ("Deadly Prison") shows. The Castillo del Terror shows, as well as the majority of the IWRG shows in general, are held in Arena Naucalpan, owned by the promoters of IWRG and their main arena. In the El Castillo del Terror match a varying number of wrestlers start out in the cage and have to remain inside the cage, fighting each other for ten minutes before they are allowed to try to escape the match. Wrestlers who climb over the top of the steel cage and touch the floor with both feet are deemed to have escaped the cage and thus escaped the Lucha de Apuestas, or "bet match", stipulation. The last wrestler in the cage is forced to either unmask (if masked) and state his given name, or (if unmasked) is forced to have all his hair shaved off as per lucha libre traditions.

=== Storylines ===
The event featured five professional wrestling matches with different wrestlers involved in pre-existing scripted feuds, plots and storylines. Wrestlers were portrayed as either heels (referred to as rudos in Mexico, those that portray the "bad guys") or faces (técnicos in Mexico, the "good guy" characters) as they followed a series of tension-building events, which culminated in a wrestling match or series of matches.

During the summer of 2008 IWRG introduced a new enmascarado or "masked wrestler", known as Arlequín, patterned after the Harlequin stage character. Initially Arlequín teamed up with Pierroth II and Hijo del Pierroth, who both used a similar black and yellow design in their wrestling gear. The trio unsuccessfully challenged Los Oficiales (Oficial 911. Oficial AK-47 and Oficial Fierro) for the IWRG Intercontinental Trios Championship. Arlequín and Hijo del Pierroth also unsuccessfully challenged Los Junior Dinamitas (Hijo de Cien Caras and Máscara Año 2000, Jr.) for their IWRG Intercontinental Tag Team Championship, but once again came up short. At the first El Castillo del Terror show in 2008, held on November 2, Arlequín was the last man in the cage as Máscara Año 2000 Jr. climbed out. As a result, he was forced to unmask, revealing that his real name was Manuel Mejia.

== Event ==
The first match of the evening was a best two-out-of-three-falls match between rookie wrestlers Eragon and Soldado del Diablo, both recent graduates of IWRG's wrestling school under Negro Navarro. The técnico Eragon won both the second and the third fall to win the match. In the second match Los Gemelos Fantasticos ("The Fantastic Twins"; Gemelo Fantastico I and Gemelo Fantastico II) defeated the makeshift tea of Fantasma de la Ópera and Némesis, two falls to one. The third match of the night was the first best two-out-of-three falls six-man tag team match, which is the most common match format in Mexico. For the match veteran rudo wrestler Cerebro Negro teamed up with the brother team known as Los Traumas (Trauma I and Trauma II) as they faced veteran Freelance and young técnicos Jack and Péndulo. Cerebro Negro cheated to take the third and final fall for his team as he pulled Péndulo's mask and then pinned him.

For the fourth match of the night Los Capos Junior ("The Junior Bosses"; El Hijo del Cien Caras and Máscara Año 2000 Jr.) took on the international team consisting of Puerto Rican Head Hunter A and Panamanian El Veneno. While Los Capos Junior were the then reigning IWRG Intercontinental Tag Team Champions, the championship was not on the line during the El Castillo del Terror show. After each team winning a fall each the third and deciding fall turned into an out of control match that saw Head Hunter A accidentally hit the referee instead of Cien Caras Jr., which drew a disqualification loss for Head Hunter A and Veneno.

For the main event wrestlers Tetsuya, Pierroth II, Fuerza Guerrera, Tetsuya and Multifacético all risked their match in the eponymous El Castillo del Terror steel cage match while Arlequín, Cerebro Negro, Máscara Año 2000, Scorpio Jr. and Zumbido were already unmasked so they risked their hair instead. IWRG announced that there would be a ten-minute time period before any of the competitors would be allowed to leave the cage. Veteran Fuerza Guerrera was the first wrestler to escape the cage, only moments after the ten minutes were up. Throughout the match regular tag team partners Pierroth II and Arlequín worked together against the other competitors, trying to prevent wrestlers from escaping the cage. Near the end of the match Pierroth II decided climb out of the cage while Arlequín was fighting against Oficial 911, leaving them behind as he kept his mask safe. In the end Oficial 911 was able to climb up the side of the cage and over the top before Arlequín had an opportunity to stop him, thus keeping his mask safe and winning the match. Afterwards Arlequín stood in the middle of the ring as IWRG's designated barber shaved all of his hair off as per the Lucha de Apuestas stipulation.

== Aftermath ==
After his hair loss IWRG decided to team Arlequín up with two similarly dressed characters Arlequín Rojo ("Harlequin Red") Arlequín Verde ("Harlequin Green"), with Meija becoming known as Arlequín Amarillo ("Harlequin Yellow") as they began working as Los Arlequíns. On September 16, 2009, Arlequín Rojo participated in IWRG's annual Guerra del Golfo event and lost the qualifying steel cage match, which put him in a match against Rigo where both wrestler's masks were on the line. Rigo won the match and the rights to remove Arlequín Rojo's mask. A few weeks later Arlequín Amarillo and Rojo lost to the team of Rigo and Chico Che, which meant that both unmasked Arlequíns had their hair shaved off as well. In late 2009 another Arlequín character was introduced, Arlequín Negro ("Black Arlequin") to make up for the fact that Arlequín Verde stopped appearing under that name and mask in IWRG. In early 2010 Arlequín Negro broke his leg in an accident, which forced him to retire. He was quietly replaced a few months later by someone else wearing the Arlequín Negro mask. By the end of 2010 the Los Arlequíns concept was slowly being phased out, the final chapter in the storyline came at the 2010 El Castillo del Terror show where Arlequín Negro lost to Comando Negro and was forced to unmask. After the match he revealed that his birth name was Jorge Hérnandez Gomez. Los Arlequín disbanded a few weeks later, with all wrestlers giving up their ring characters.

== Results ==
No.	Results	Stipulations
1	Eragon defeated Soldado del Diablo	Best two-out-of-three-falls match
2	Los Gemelos Fantasticos (Gemelo Fantastico I and Gemelo Fantastico II) defeated Fantasma de la Ópera and Némesis	Best two-out-of-three-falls tag team match
3	Cerebro Negro and Los Traumas (Trauma I and Trauma II) defeated Freelance, Jack and Péndulo	Best two-out-of-three falls six-man tag team match
4	El Hijo del Cien Caras and Máscara Año 2000 Jr. defeated Head Hunter A and El Veneno by disqualification	Best two-out-of-three falls tag team match
5	Oficial 911 defeated Arlequín; Also in the match: Scorpio Jr., Fuerza Guerrera, Tetsuya, Cerebro Negro, Pierroth II, Zumbido, Máscara Año 2000 and Multifacético	10-man El Castillo del Terror Luchas de Apuestas, Mask or hair match
