= El Castillo del Terror (2012) =

2012 International Wrestling Revolution Group event

- Official poster for the event
- Promotion: International Wrestling Revolution Group
- Date: November 1, 2012
- City: Naucalpan, State of Mexico
- Venue: Arena Naucalpan

Event chronology
← Previous; Ruleta de la Muerte	Next → Prison Fatal

El Castillo del Terror chronology
← Previous; 2011	Next → 2013

El Castillo del Terror (2012) was a professional wrestling event, the eight annual El Castillo del Terror event produced by the International Wrestling Revolution Group (IWRG). IWRG has held an Castillo del Terror branded show since 2005, usually late in the year, making this year's event the eight overall event in the series. The event took place on November 1, 2012, at Arena Naucalpan in Naucalpan, State of Mexico. The main event was the eponymous Castillo del Terror (Spanish for "Castle of Terror") Steel cage match where the last person eliminated was forced to unmasked per the match stipulation. The event was IWRG's Dia de los Muertes ("Day of the Dead") and Halloween holiday celebration.

== Production ==
=== Background ===
Starting as far back as at least 2002, the Mexican wrestling promotion International Wrestling Revolution Group (IWRG; Sometimes referred to as Grupo Internacional Revolución in Spanish) has held several annual events where the main event was a multi-man steel cage match where the last wrestler left in the cage would be forced to either remove their wrestling mask or have their hair shaved off under Lucha de Apuestas, or "bet match", rules. From 2005 IWRG has promoted a fall show, around the Mexican Day of the Death, under the name El Castillo del Terror ("The Tower of Terror") to distinguish it from other Steel cage matches held throughout the year such as the IWRG Guerra del Golfo ("Gulf War"), IWRG Guerra de Sexos ("War of the Sexes") or IWRG Prison Fatal ("Deadly Prison") shows. The Castillo del Terror shows, as well as the majority of the IWRG shows in general, are held in "Arena Naucalpan", owned by the promoters of IWRG and their main arena. The 2012 Castillo del Terror show was the eighth year in a row that IWRG promoted a show under that name.

=== Storylines ===
The event featured five professional wrestling matches with different wrestlers involved in pre-existing scripted feuds, plots and storylines. Wrestlers were portrayed as either heels (referred to as rudos in Mexico, those that portray the "bad guys") or faces (técnicos in Mexico, the "good guy" characters) as they followed a series of tension-building events, which culminated in a wrestling match or series of matches. The Main Event was a 12-Man Steel Cage Match. The last two wrestlers who remained in the ring fought one on one in a Lucha de Apuestas Match ("Bet match"), wagering their mask on the outcome of the match. The event included wrestlers from International Wrestling Revolution Group (IWRG), Lucha Libre AAA World Wide (AAA) and a number of Mexican Freelance wrestlers.

== Event ==
In the main event El Ángel defeated Oficial Fierro to force him to unmask and announce that his name was Fernando Montes Martínez, from Mexico City, 38 years old, and 13 years as a wrestler. Seven years earlier Fernando Montes was revealed as wrestling under the ring name Ultra Mega when he was unmasked under similar circumstances as a result of a steel cage match.

=== Results ===
No.	Results	Stipulations
1	Mini Super Astro and Voladorcito defeated Bracito de Plata and Mini Psicosis	Tag Team Mini-Estrella match
2	Amazona, Fenix and Ludark Shaitan defeated Cristal, La Sádica and Pasion Kristal	Best two out of three falls Six-person Relevos de Locura match
3	Dragón Celestial, Arana de Plata, Jr., La Cobra, Matrix, Jr., Relampago, Serpiente de Oro, Sky Ángel and Violencia, Jr. defeated Alan Extreme, Centvrión, Comando Negro, Dinamic Black, Eterno, Golden Magic, Imposible and Saruman	2012 Copa Higher Power torneo cibernetico
4	Los Psycho Circus (Monster Clown, Murder Clown and Psycho Clown) defeated Cien Caras, Jr., Espíritu and Heddi Karaoui	Lumberjack Strap Match
5	El Ángel defeated Oficial Fierro; Also in the match: Hijo de Máscara Año 2000, Trauma I, Oficial Spartan, Oficial 911, Oficial Factor, Trauma II, Carta Brava, Jr., Hijo del Pirata Morgan, Hijo de L.A. Park and El Hijo de Dr. Wagner	El Castillo del Terror Luchas de Apuestas, Mask vs. Mask match.
