= IWRG El Castillo del Terror =

International Wrestling Revolution Group event series

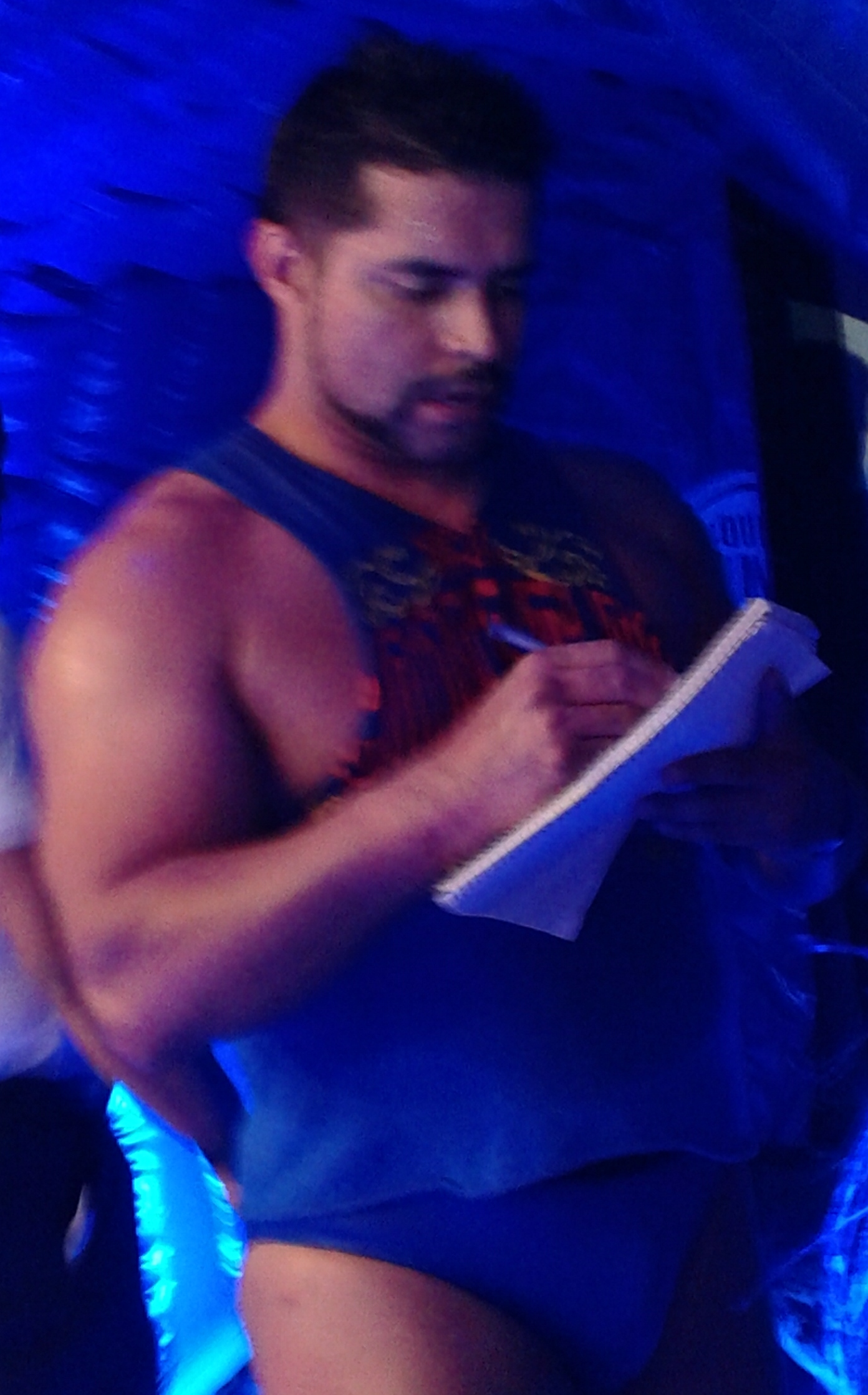
Máscara Año 2000, Jr., winner of the November 2008 Castillo del Terror match.

El Castillo del Terror is a professional wrestling event produced and scripted annually by the lucha Libre promotion International Wrestling Revolution Group (IWRG). The event was established in 2000 and is held in November each year in Arena Naucalpan, IWRG's main arena in Naucalpan, State of Mexico. The annual show features the eponymous main event match; a multi-man Steel Cage Match where the last man in the cage is forced to unmask under Luchas de Apuestas, or "Bet rules". In rival Mexican promotion Consejo Mundial de Lucha Libre (CMLL) the match is referred to as Infierno en el Ring, but is the same concept. The 2015 event marked the fifteenth time that IWRG has held a Castillo del Terror event and the fourth time that Golden Magic has won the mask of an opponent by being the last man to escape the cage; unmasking King Drako, Alan Extreme, Kenshin Kabuki and El Golpelador.

A total of 116 wrestlers have participated in one or more Castillo del Terror cage matches, with Oficial 911 holding a record of eight matches in total; Golden Magic is the only wrestler to have won multiple matches, four. Yack has participate under two different names, working as "Bakteria" in 2006 and Jack/Yack in November 2008 and 2009. |Oficial Factor previously wrestled and lost a Castillo del Terror match under the name "Mega", while Oficial 911 previous wrestled under the name "Comando Mega". Wrestlers from IWRG, CMLL, Lucha Libre AAA World Wide (AAA) and the Mexican Independent circuit have all participated in a Castillo del Terror match. IWRG holds several multi-man steel cage Luchas de Apuesta matches throughout the year, but only refer to the November show match as the Castillo del Terror. Events with a similar match in the main event includes Guerra de Sexos and Guerra del Golfo. Being professional wrestling events matches are not won legitimately; they are instead won via predetermined outcomes to the matches that is kept secret from the general public.

== List of El Castillo del Terror winners ==
Year	Winner	Loser	Wager	Ref(s)
2000	Último Vampiro IV	Super Mega	Mask	
2002	Mega	Karma	Mask	
2003	Mega	Comando Alfa	Mask	
2004	Black Dragon	Mega	Mask	
2005	Masada	Cerebro Negro	Mask	
2006	Ave Fénix	Macho II	Mask	
2007	Rayo de Jalisco, Jr.	Enterrador 2000	Mask	
November 2008	Máscara Año 2000, Jr.	Arlequín Amarillo	Mask	
December 2008	Oficial 911	Arlequín	Hair	
2009	Oficial 911	Yack	Mask	
2010	Comando Negro	Arlequín Negro	Mask	
2011	Golden Magic	King Drako	Mask	
2012	El Ángel	Oficial Fierro	Mask	
2013	Golden Magic	Alan Extreme	Mask	
2014	Golden Magic	Kenshin Kabuki	Mask	
2015	Golden Magic	El Golpelador	Mask	
2016	Uncertain	Zatura	Mask	
2017	Black Dragón	Oficial Spartan	Mask	

== Dates, venues and main events ==
Event	Date	Venue	City	Main event	Ref(s)
2000	November 2, 2000	Arena Naucalpan	Naucalpan, State of Mexico	multi-Man steel cage match	
2002	October 31, 2002	Arena Naucalpan	Naucalpan, State of Mexico	10-Man steel cage match	
2003	November 2, 2003	Arena Naucalpan	Naucalpan, State of Mexico	Multi-Man steel cage match	
2004	October 31, 2004	Arena Naucalpan	Naucalpan, State of Mexico	Multi-Man steel cage match	
2005	November 3, 2005	Arena Naucalpan	Naucalpan, State of Mexico	10-Man steel cage match	
2006	November 2, 2006	Arena Naucalpan	Naucalpan, State of Mexico	9-Man steel cage match	
2007	November 1, 2007	Arena Naucalpan	Naucalpan, State of Mexico	9-man Steel cage match	
November 2008	November 2, 2008	Arena Naucalpan	Naucalpan, State of Mexico	10-man Steel cage match	
December 2008	December 21, 2008	Arena Naucalpan	Naucalpan, State of Mexico	10-Man steel cage match	
2009	November 1, 2009	Arena Naucalpan	Naucalpan, State of Mexico	10-man Steel cage match	
2010	November 4, 2010	Arena Naucalpan	Naucalpan, State of Mexico	12-Man steel cage match	
2011	November 3, 2011	Arena Naucalpan	Naucalpan, State of Mexico	10-Man steel cage match	
2012	November 1, 2012	Arena Naucalpan	Naucalpan, State of Mexico	12-Man steel cage match	
2013	November 3, 2013	Arena Naucalpan	Naucalpan, State of Mexico	10-Man steel cage match	
2014	November 2, 2014	Arena Naucalpan	Naucalpan, State of Mexico	11-Man steel cage match	
2015	November 1, 2015	Arena Naucalpan	Naucalpan, State of Mexico	10-man steel cage match	
2016	November 3, 2016	Arena Naucalpan	Naucalpan, State of Mexico	10-man steel cage match	
2017	November 3, 2017	Arena Naucalpan	Naucalpan, State of Mexico	10-man steel cage match	
2018	November 1, 2018	Arena Naucalpan	Naucalpan, State of Mexico	TBA	
