= El Castillo del Terror (2004) =

2004 International Wrestling Revolution Group event

- Promotion: International Wrestling Revolution Group
- Date: October 31, 2004
- City: Naucalpan, State of Mexico
- Venue: Arena Naucalpan

Event chronology
← Previous —	Next → Arena Naucalpan 27th Anniversary Show

IWRG El Castillo del Terror chronology
← Previous; 2003	Next → 2005

The 2004 El Castillo del Terror (Spanish for "The Tower of Terror") was a major lucha libre event produced and scripted by the Mexican International Wrestling Revolution Group (IWRG) professional wrestling promotion on October 31, 2004. The 2004 El Castillo del Terror was the fourth ever IWRG El Castillo del Terror event held. The main event was the eponymous Castillo del Terror (Spanish for "Tower of Terror") Steel cage match where the last person eliminated would be forced to take off his wrestling mask or have his hair shaved off as a result of the loss.

Due to incomplete records of the main event, the only known participants was the winner Black Dragon and Mega as the loser of the El Castillo del Terror main event. The remaining Castillo del Terror participants are unknown.

== Production ==
=== Background ===
The Mexican wrestling promotion International Wrestling Revolution Group (IWRG; Sometimes referred to as Grupo Internacional Revolución in Spanish) has a long-standing history of holding major event focused on a multi-man steel cage match where the last wrestler left in the cage would be forced to either remove their wrestling mask or have their hair shaved off under Lucha de Apuestas, or "bet match", rules. Starting in the year 20002005 IWRG has promoted a fall show, around the Mexican Day of the Death, under the name El Castillo del Terror ("The Tower of Terror"), creating an annual event on their major show calendar that has been held almost every year since 2000. The 2004 El Castillo del Terror show was the fourth overall show under that name, with IWRG not holding a Castillo del Terror in 2001.

The El Castillo del Terror event is one of several annual steel cage match shows that IWRG holds throughout the year such as the IWRG Guerra del Golfo ("Gulf War"), IWRG Guerra de Sexos ("War of the Sexes"), or IWRG Prison Fatal ("Deadly Prison") shows. The Castillo del Terror shows, as well as the majority of the IWRG shows in general, are held in Arena Naucalpan, owned by the promoters of IWRG and their main arena. In the El Castillo del Terror match a varying number of wrestlers start out in the cage and have to remain inside the cage, fighting each other for ten minutes before they are allowed to try to escape the match. Wrestlers who climb over the top of the steel cage and touch the floor with both feet are deemed to have escaped the cage and thus escaped the Lucha de Apuestas, or "bet match", stipulation. The last wrestler in the cage is forced to either unmask (if masked) and state his given name, or (if unmasked) is forced to have all his hair shaved off as per lucha libre traditions.

=== Storylines ===
The event featured an unknown number of professional wrestling matches with different wrestlers involved in pre-existing scripted feuds, plots and storylines. Wrestlers were portrayed as either heels (referred to as rudos in Mexico, those that portray the "bad guys") or faces (técnicos in Mexico, the "good guy" characters) as they followed a series of tension-building events, which culminated in a wrestling match or series of matches.

In 1999 IWRG introduced Mega and Super Mega, a team called Los Megas, a group of masked, brightly colored kid-friendly tecnico characters. They later added Ultra Mega to the group, making them a regular trio. At the very first El Castillo del Terror event Super Mega lost his mask, but the trio remained together. Los Megas defeated Los Oficiales (Guardia, Oficial and Vigilante) on August 2, 2001 to win the Distrito Federal Trios Championship, starting off a 161-day-long title reign. The trio was defeated for the title by Dr. Cerebro, Cirujano and Paramedico on January 10, 2002. Only a month later Mega and Ultra Mega defeated Fantasy and Star Boy to win the IWRG Intercontinental Tag Team Championship. They team held the title for 73 days until losing to MAZADA and NOZAWA. Around that time Super Mega left IWRG to work for Consejo Mundial de Lucha Libre, which caused IWRG to bring in Omega to keep Los Megas a trio.

In 2003 IWRG introduced a group designed to be the "archenemy" of Los Megas in the form of Los Comandos (Comando Alfa, Comando Mega and Comando Gama), who were dark and destructive to counter Los Megas' bright, kid-friendly personas. The groups developed their rivalry for the better part of a year, escalating the tension between the two groups. At the 2003 El Castillo del Terror Mega defeated Comando Alfa, forcing him to unmask. After the loss of his mask Los Comandos brought in "Comando Omega" as the faction rivalry continued to build. Los Comandos scored a major victory in the feud when Comando Gama defeated Omega in a Lucha de Apuestas match. Omega removed his mask and subsequently was only used sporadically. The storyline between the two factions saw Mega and Ultra Mega gain revenge and "win" the feud by defeating Comando Mega and Comando Gama in a Lucha de Apuesta, masks vs. masks match on June 6, 2004, a match that was considered the end of the Megas Vs Comandos storyline.

== Event ==
Records are unclear on most of the wrestlers who actually participated in the main event, event results published shortly after the show only mention the winner and the loser of the match, but offered no real details, outside of pictures, on the progression of the match, nor gave any names for other participants in the steel cage match. The final two wrestlers were Mega and Black Dragon with Black Dragon pinning Mega to win the match. As a result of his loss Mega was forced to remove his wrestling mask and state his birth name, Cesar Caballero, as well as his age and how long he had been a professional wrestler, per lucha libre traditions.

== Aftermath ==
Caballero only used the name "Mega" for a short time after unmasking, having but a few matches into early 2005 before disappearing for a period of time. He would later return to IWRG, once again masked and using the ring name "Oficial Factor", forming Los Oficiales Elite alongside Oficial Spartan and Oficial Rayan in 2012.

The following year, on December 22, 2005 Ultra Mega was one of the participants in the 2005 El Castillo del Terror show. The match came down to Ultra Mega and Nemesis, with Nemesis winning the match, forcing Ultra Mega to unmask.

== Results ==
No.	Results	Stipulations
1	Mr. Black defeated Águila Oriental	Best two-out-of-three-falls singles match
2	Los Comandos (Comando Delta and Comando Gama) defeated Galactik and Turako	Best two-out-of-three-falls tag team match
3	Los Payasos (Coco Blanco, Coco Rojo and Coco Verde) defeated Dr. Cerebro, Paramedico and Xibalva	Best two-out-of-three falls six-man tag team match
4	Andy Barrow El Canek and Steel Man I defeated El Pantera, Tinieblas Jr. and Villano V	Best two-out-of-three falls six-man tag team match
5	Black Dragon defeated Mega; Other participants are unknown.	Multi-man El Castillo del Terror Luchas de Apuestas, mask or hair match
