= El Castillo del Terror (2014) =

2014 International Wrestling Revolution Group event

- Official poster advertising the participants of the Castillo match
- Promotion: International Wrestling Revolution Group
- Date: November 2, 2014
- City: Naucalpan, State of Mexico
- Venue: Arena Naucalpan

Event chronology
← Previous; La Isla	Next → 52nd Anniversary of Lucha Libre in Estado de México

El Castillo del Terror chronology
← Previous; 2013	Next → 2015

El Castillo del Terror (2014) was a professional wrestling event, the tenth annual El Castillo del Terror event produced by the International Wrestling Revolution Group (IWRG). IWRG has held an Castillo del Terror branded show since 2005, usually late in the year, making this year's event the tenth overall event in the series. The event took place on November 2, 2014, at Arena Naucalpan in Naucalpan, State of Mexico. The main event was the eponymous Castillo del Terror (Spanish for "Castle of Terror") Steel cage match where the last person eliminated was forced to unmasked per the match stipulation. The event was IWRG's Dia de los Muertes ("Day of the Dead") and Halloween holiday celebration.

== Production ==
=== Background ===
Starting as far back as at least 2002, the Mexican wrestling promotion International Wrestling Revolution Group (IWRG; Sometimes referred to as Grupo Internacional Revolución in Spanish) has held several annual events where the main event was a multi-man steel cage match where the last wrestler left in the cage would be forced to either remove their wrestling mask or have their hair shaved off under Lucha de Apuestas, or "bet match", rules. From 2005 IWRG has promoted a fall show, around the Mexican Day of the Death, under the name El Castillo del Terror ("The Tower of Terror") to distinguish it from other Steel cage matches held throughout the year such as the IWRG Guerra del Golfo ("Gulf War"), IWRG Guerra de Sexos ("War of the Sexes") or IWRG Prison Fatal ("Deadly Prison") shows. The Castillo del Terror shows, as well as the majority of the IWRG shows in general, are held in "Arena Naucalpan", owned by the promoters of IWRG and their main arena. The 2014 Castillo del Terror show was the tenth year in a row that IWRG promoted a show under that name.

=== Storylines ===
The event featured five professional wrestling matches with different wrestlers involved in pre-existing scripted feuds, plots and storylines. Wrestlers were portrayed as either heels (referred to as rudos in Mexico, those that portray the "bad guys") or faces (técnicos in Mexico, the "good guy" characters) as they followed a series of tension-building events, which culminated in a wrestling match or series of matches. The Main Event was a 12-Man Steel Cage Match. The last two wrestlers who remained in the ring fought one on one in a Lucha de Apuestas Match ("Bet match"), wagering their mask on the outcome of the match. The event included wrestlers from International Wrestling Revolution Group (IWRG) as well as a number of Mexican freelance wrestlers.

== Event ==
In the second match of the night the group known as Los Comandos Elite added two new members as Comando Rayan and Comando Spartan teamed up with two new masked characters Comando Liderk and Comando Spector. Since both were masked it is possible that IWRG chose to give the ring characters to wrestlers who had worked for IWRG in the past under other names. In their debut Los Comandos Elite faced off against Los Tortugas Ninjas (Leo, Mike, Rafy and Teelo) four wrestlers in gear resembling the Teenage Mutant Ninja Turtles, including their masks. Los Tortugas defeated Los Comandos Elite, but the fighting continued after the match, indicating that the end of the match was not necessarily the end of the conflict between the two factions. Demon Clown was originally scheduled to team up with El Hijo de Máscara Año 2000 and X-Fly in the third match of the show, but on the day he was replaced by Eterno instead with no explanation given by IWRG. The trio of rudos lost to the team of Grond XXX, Negro Navarro and Toscano in a best two-out-of-three falls six-man Lucha Libre rules match.

The fourth match of the night was for the IWRG Intercontinental Heavyweight Championship, IWRG's top ranked singles championship, as champion El Hijo de Dos Caras faced off against Cien Caras, Jr. The challenger was accompanied by Máscara Año 2000, Jr. for the match. Before the match Cien Caras, Jr. promised that the match would be 100% technical and clean, only to start cheating moments into the match, including having Máscara Año 2000, Jr. interfere on his behalf. The match came down to the third and deciding fall, which Cien Caras, Jr. won, pinning Hijo de Dos Caras after Máscara Año 2000, Jr. fouled him behind the referee's back. Cien Caras, Jr.'s victory celebration was cut short when a representative from the Mexico City wrestling commission informed the referee that he had overturned the decision, disqualifying Cien Caras, Jr. With the disqualification El Hijo de Dos Caras was given the championship back.

The main event, Castillo del Terror match started with all 10 wrestlers fighting inside the steel cage for 10 minutes before they were even allowed to attempt to escape the cage. Moments after the 10 minute mark Violencia, Jr. escaped the ring, making him the first man to successfully defend his mask. After seven other wrestlers climbed up the side of the cage and over the top the match came down to Golden Magic and relative newcomer Kenshi Kabuki. In the end Golden Magic escaped the cage, winning the mask of his opponent for the third time in Castillo del Terror history. Kenshi Kabuki was to force unmask as a result of the loss as per Lucha Libre traditions. The supposed Japanese wrestler spoke perfect Spanish as he unmasked, revealing that he was indeed Mexican and that his real name was Diego Lopez Reyes, who had previously worked in IWRG under the ring name Chicano, a name he would resume as a result of losing the Kenshi Kabuki mask.

=== Results ===
No.	Results	Stipulations
1	Araña de Plata, Oficialito and Sexy Girl defeated Mini Rencor, Sky Ángel and Vanely	Best two-out-of-three falls six-person Relevos de Locura match
2	Los Tortugas Ninjas (Leo, Mike, Rafy and Teelo) defeated Los Comandos Elite (Comando Liderk, Comando Rayan, Comando Spartan and Comando Spector)	Best two-out-of-three falls eight-man Lucha Libre rules match
3	Grond XXX, Negro Navarro and Toscano defeated Eterno, El Hijo de Máscara Año 2000 and X-Fly	Best two-out-of-three falls six-man Lucha Libre rules match
4	El Hijo de Dos Caras (c) defeated Cien Caras, Jr. by disqualification	Best two-out-of three falls match for the IWRG Intercontinental Heavyweight Championship
5	Golden Magic defeated Kenshi Kabuki; Also in the match: Canis Lupus, Emperador Azteca, Imposible, Metaleón, Relámpago, Trauma II, Universo 2000 Jr., Violencia Jr.	El Castillo del Terror Luchas de Apuestas, Mask vs. Mask match.
(c) / – the champion(s) heading into the match
