= El Castillo del Terror (2002) =

2002 International Wrestling Revolution Group event

- Promotion: International Wrestling Revolution Group
- Date: October 31, 2002
- City: Naucalpan, State of Mexico
- Venue: Arena Naucalpan

Event chronology
← Previous; Rey del Ring	Next → Arena Naucalpan 25th Anniversary Show

IWRG El Castillo del Terror chronology
← Previous; 2000	Next → 2003

The 2002 El Castillo del Terror (Spanish for "The Tower of Terror") was a major lucha libre event produced and scripted by the Mexican International Wrestling Revolution Group (IWRG) professional wrestling promotion on October 31, 2002. The 2002 El Castillo del Terror was the second ever IWRG El Castillo del Terror event held. The main event was the eponymous Castillo del Terror (Spanish for "Tower of Terror") Steel cage match where the last person eliminated would be forced to take off his wrestling mask or have his hair shaved off as a result of the loss.

Due to incomplete records of the show the only known results state that Mega was listed as the winner of the El Castillo del Terror main event while Karma lost the match and thus had to unmask and reveal that he was actually Ari Romero under the mask. The remaining results have not been found in documentation.

== Production ==
=== Background ===
The Mexican wrestling promotion International Wrestling Revolution Group (IWRG; Sometimes referred to as Grupo Internacional Revolución in Spanish) has a long-standing history of holding major event focused on a multi-man steel cage match where the last wrestler left in the cage would be forced to either remove their wrestling mask or have their hair shaved off under Lucha de Apuestas, or "bet match", rules. Starting in the year 20002005 IWRG has promoted a fall show, around the Mexican Day of the Death, under the name El Castillo del Terror ("The Tower of Terror"), creating an annual event on their major show calendar that has been held almost every year since 2000. The 2002 El Castillo del Terror show was the second overall show under that name, with IWRG not holding a Castillo del Terror in 2001.

The El Castillo del Terror event is one of several annual steel cage match shows that IWRG holds throughout the year such as the IWRG Guerra del Golfo ("Gulf War"), IWRG Guerra de Sexos ("War of the Sexes"), or IWRG Prison Fatal ("Deadly Prison") shows. The Castillo del Terror shows, as well as the majority of the IWRG shows in general, are held in Arena Naucalpan, owned by the promoters of IWRG and their main arena. In the El Castillo del Terror match a varying number of wrestlers start out in the cage and have to remain inside the cage, fighting each other for ten minutes before they are allowed to try to escape the match. Wrestlers who climb over the top of the steel cage and touch the floor with both feet are deemed to have escaped the cage and thus escaped the Lucha de Apuestas, or "bet match", stipulation. The last wrestler in the cage is forced to either unmask (if masked) and state his given name, or (if unmasked) is forced to have all his hair shaved off as per lucha libre traditions.

=== Storylines ===
The event featured an unknown number of professional wrestling matches with different wrestlers involved in pre-existing scripted feuds, plots and storylines. Wrestlers were portrayed as either heels (referred to as rudos in Mexico, those that portray the "bad guys") or faces (técnicos in Mexico, the "good guy" characters) as they followed a series of tension-building events, which culminated in a wrestling match or series of matches.

== Event ==
Records are unclear on most of the show, including most of the wrestlers who actually participated in the main event, in the only found written sources from 2002 it states that Karma lost the match and that Mega was credited with the win, but did not state which wrestlers exited the steel cage prior to Karma and Mega. After the match Karma was forced to unmask and reveal his birth name, Jose Luis Arias Romero, better known as Ari Romero. Romero had been a professional wrestler since 1967 who primarily worked around Ciudad Juárez.

== Aftermath ==
The Castillo del Terror match was one of Romero's last matches in IWRG and one of Romero's last matches before going into semi-retirement from that point on, only wrestling on rare occasions.

== Results ==
No.	Results	Stipulations
1	Mega defeated Karma	10-man El Castillo del Terror Luchas de Apuestas, mask or hair match
