= El Castillo del Terror (2015) =

2015 International Wrestling Revolution Group event

- Official poster for the show, featuring the men in the steel cage match
- Promotion: International Wrestling Revolution Group
- Date: November 1, 2015
- City: Naucalpan, State of Mexico
- Venue: Arena Naucalpan

Event chronology
← Previous; Caravana de Campeones	Next → Arena Naucalpan 38th Anniversary Show

El Castillo del Terror chronology
← Previous; 2014	Next → 2016

El Castillo del Terror (2015) (Spanish for "The Tower of Terror") was a major professional wrestling event, the eleventh annual El Castillo del Terror event, produced by the International Wrestling Revolution Group (IWRG) that took place on November 1, 2015. IWRG has held their Castillo del Terror show since 2005, usually late in the year. As with the majority of the IWRG shows it took place at Arena Naucalpan in Naucalpan, State of Mexico, the home of IWRG. The main event was the eponymous Castillo del Terror Steel cage match where the last person eliminated would be forced to unmasked per the match stipulation. The 2015 Castillo del Terror match ended in controversial fashion as wrestler El Golpeador fell off the side of the cage to the floor, which according to the stipulation meant he was the winner, but since Golden Magic was actually supposed to win IWRG announced that El Golpeador was the loser and had to unmask.

== Production ==
=== Background ===
Starting as far back as at least 2002, the Mexican wrestling promotion International Wrestling Revolution Group (IWRG; Sometimes referred to as Grupo Internacional Revolución in Spanish) has held several annual events where the main event was a multi-man steel cage match where the last wrestler left in the cage would be forced to either remove their wrestling mask or have their hair shaved off under Lucha de Apuestas, or "bet match", rules. From 2005 IWRG has promoted a fall show, around the Mexican Day of the Death, under the name El Castillo del Terror ("The Tower of Terror") to distinguish it from other Steel cage matches held throughout the year such as the IWRG Guerra del Golfo ("Gulf War"), IWRG Guerra de Sexos ("War of the Sexes") or IWRG Prison Fatal ("Deadly Prison") shows. The Castillo del Terror shows, as well as the majority of the IWRG shows in general, are held in "Arena Naucalpan", owned by the promoters of IWRG and their main arena. The 2015 Castillo del Terror show will be the 11th year in a row that IWRG has promoted a show under that name.

=== Storylines ===
The event featured five professional wrestling matches with different wrestlers involved in pre-existing scripted feuds, plots and storylines. Wrestlers portrayed themselves as either heels (referred to as rudos in Mexico, those that portray the "bad guys") or faces (técnicos in Mexico, the "good guy" characters) as they followed a series of tension-building events, which culminated in wrestling matches.

=== Results ===
No.	Results	Stipulations
1	Atomic Star and Vampiro Metalico II defeated Black Dragon and Dragon Bane	Best two-out-of-three falls tag team match
2	Los Tortugas Ninjas (Leo, Mike and Teelo) defeated Diablo Jr. I, Imposible and Vortize	Best two-out-of-three falls six-man "Lucha Libre rules" tag team match
3	Los Megas (Mega, Super Mega and Ultra Mega) defeated Oficial AK-47, Eterno and Spector	Best two-out-of-three falls six-man "Lucha Libre rules" tag team match
4	El Hijo de Dos Caras (with Veneno) defeated Máscara Año 2000, Jr. (c) (with Canis Lupus) – two falls to one	Best two-out-of-three falls match for the IWRG Intercontinental Heavyweight Championship
5	Golden Magic defeated El Golpeador; Also in the cage: Astro, Canis Lupus, El Hijo del Pantera, Rafy, Rayan, Super Nova, Trauma I and Trauma II	10-man El Castillo del Terror, Luchas de Apuestas, Mask vs. Mask Match
(c) / – the champion(s) heading into the match
