= El Castillo del Terror (2007) =

2007 International Wrestling Revolution Group event

- Promotion: International Wrestling Revolution Group
- Date: November 7, 2007
- City: Naucalpan, State of Mexico
- Venue: Arena Naucalpan

Event chronology
← Previous; Rey del Ring	Next → IWRG 11th Anniversary Show

El Castillo del Terror chronology
← Previous; 2006	Next → November 2008

El Castillo del Terror (2007) was a professional wrestling event, their annual El Castillo del Terror event produced by the International Wrestling Revolution Group (IWRG). IWRG has held an Castillo del Terror branded show since 2005, usually late in the year, making this year's event the third overall event in the series. The event took place on November 3, 2013, at Arena Naucalpan in Naucalpan, State of Mexico, IWRG's main arena. The main event was the eponymous Castillo del Terror (Spanish for "Castle of Terror") Steel cage match where the last person eliminated was forced to unmasked per the match stipulation. In the end the ten-man match saw Rayo de Jalisco, Jr. defeat Enterrador 2000, forcing him to unmask after the match.

== Production ==
=== Background ===
Starting as far back as at least 2002, the Mexican wrestling promotion International Wrestling Revolution Group (IWRG; Sometimes referred to as Grupo Internacional Revolución in Spanish) has held several annual events where the main event was a multi-man steel cage match where the last wrestler left in the cage would be forced to either remove their wrestling mask or have their hair shaved off under Lucha de Apuestas, or "bet match", rules. From 2005 IWRG has promoted a fall show, around the Mexican Day of the Death, under the name El Castillo del Terror ("The Tower of Terror") to distinguish it from other Steel cage matches held throughout the year such as the IWRG Guerra del Golfo ("Gulf War"), IWRG Guerra de Sexos ("War of the Sexes") or IWRG Prison Fatal ("Deadly Prison") shows. The Castillo del Terror shows, as well as the majority of the IWRG shows in general, are held in "Arena Naucalpan", owned by the promoters of IWRG and their main arena. The 2007 Castillo del Terror show was the third year in a row that IWRG promoted a show under that name.

=== Storylines ===
The event featured an undetermined number of professional wrestling matches with different wrestlers involved in pre-existing scripted feuds, plots and storylines. Wrestlers were portrayed as either heels (referred to as rudos in Mexico, those that portray the "bad guys") or faces (técnicos in Mexico, the "good guy" characters) as they followed a series of tension-building events, which culminated in a wrestling match or series of matches. The Main Event was a 12-Man Steel Cage Match. The last two wrestlers who remained in the ring fought one on one in a Lucha de Apuestas Match ("Bet match"), wagering their mask on the outcome of the match. The event included wrestlers from International Wrestling Revolution Group (IWRG) as well as a number of Mexican freelance wrestlers.

== Results ==
No.	Results	Stipulations
1	Rayo de Jalisco, Jr. defeated Enterrador 2000; Also in the match: Bogeman, Máscara Año 2000, Jr., Medico Asesino, Jr., Oficial Fierro, Coco Verde, Septiembe Negro II, Captain Muerte	El Castillo del Terror Luchas de Apuestas, Mask vs. Mask match.
