= El Castillo del Terror (2006) =

2006 International Wrestling Revolution Group event

- Promotion: International Wrestling Revolution Group
- Date: November 2, 2006
- City: Naucalpan, State of Mexico
- Venue: Arena Naucalpan

Event chronology
← Previous; Guerra del Golfo	Next → IWRG Noches de Campeones

El Castillo del Terror chronology
← Previous; 2005	Next → 2007

El Castillo del Terror (2006) was the second annual El Castillo del Terror professional wrestling event produced by the International Wrestling Revolution Group. It took place on November 2, 2006, at Arena Naucalpan in Naucalpan, State of Mexico. The show featured the eponymous main event match; a nine-man Steel Cage Match where the last two men in the cage were forced to wrestle each other and the loser would be forced to unmask under Luchas de Apuestas, or "Bet rules". For the 2006 event Ave Fénix, Bacteria, Fabián el Gitano, Fantasma de la Ópera, El Felino, El Hijo del Diablo, Macho II, Nitro and Xibalva all wagered their masks on the outcome of the match. The match came down to Ave Fénix and Macho II, with Fénix pinning Macho II to force him to unmask afterwards.

== Production ==
=== Background ===
Starting as far back as at least 2002, the Mexican wrestling promotion International Wrestling Revolution Group (IWRG; Sometimes referred to as Grupo Internacional Revolución in Spanish) has held several annual events where the main event was a multi-man steel cage match where the last wrestler left in the cage would be forced to either remove their wrestling mask or have their hair shaved off under Lucha de Apuestas, or "bet match", rules. From 2005 IWRG has promoted a fall show, around the Mexican Day of the Death, under the name El Castillo del Terror ("The Tower of Terror") to distinguish it from other Steel cage matches held throughout the year such as the IWRG Guerra del Golfo ("Gulf War"), IWRG Guerra de Sexos ("War of the Sexes") or IWRG Prison Fatal ("Deadly Prison") shows. The Castillo del Terror shows, as well as the majority of the IWRG shows in general, are held in "Arena Naucalpan", owned by the promoters of IWRG and their main arena. The 2006 Castillo del Terror show was the second year in a row that IWRG promoted a show under that name.

=== Storylines ===
The event featured five professional wrestling matches with different wrestlers involved in pre-existing scripted feuds, plots and storylines. Wrestlers were portrayed as either heels (referred to as rudos in Mexico, those that portray the "bad guys") or faces (técnicos in Mexico, the "good guy" characters) as they followed a series of tension-building events, which culminated in a wrestling match or series of matches.

== Results ==
No.	Results	Stipulations
1	Comando Gama defeated Golem	Singles Match
2	Intrepid and Símbolo defeated Black Stone and Comando Mega	Tag Team Match
3	Luna Mágica, Princesa Blanca and Sahori defeated La Nazi, La Rebelde and Rosa Negra	Six-Man Tag Team Match
4	Freelance (C) defeated Black Jaguar	Singles Match for the IWRG Intercontinental Welterweight Championship
5	Ave Fénix defeated Macho II; Also in the match: Bacteria, El Felino, El Hijo del Diablo, Fabián el Gitano, Fantasma de la Ópera, Nitro and Xibalva defeated	9-man El Castillo del Terror, Luchas de Apuestas, Mask vs. Mask Match
