= El Castillo del Terror (2017) =

2017 International Wrestling Revolution Group event

- Official poster of the event
- Promotion: International Wrestling Revolution Group
- Date: November 2, 2017
- City: Naucalpan, State of Mexico
- Venue: Arena Naucalpan

Event chronology
← Previous; Caravana de Campeones	Next → 55th Anniversary of Lucha Libre in Estado de México

El Castillo del Terror chronology
← Previous; 2016	Next → 2018

El Castillo del Terror (2017) (Spanish for "The Tower of Terror") was a major professional wrestling event, the eleventh annual El Castillo del Terror event, produced by the International Wrestling Revolution Group (IWRG) that took place on November 2, 2017. IWRG has held their Castillo del Terror show since 2005, usually late in the year. As with the majority of the IWRG shows it took place at Arena Naucalpan in Naucalpan, State of Mexico, the home of IWRG. The main event was the eponymous Castillo del Terror Steel cage match where the last person eliminated would be forced to unmasked per the Lucha de Apuestas, or "bet match", stipulation.

== Background ==
Starting as far back as at least 2002, the Mexican wrestling promotion International Wrestling Revolution Group (IWRG; Sometimes referred to as Grupo Internacional Revolución in Spanish) has held several annual events where the main event was a multi-man steel cage match where the last wrestler left in the cage would be forced to either remove their wrestling mask or have their hair shaved off under Lucha de Apuestas, or "bet match", rules. From 2005 IWRG has promoted a fall show, around the Mexican Day of the Death, under the name El Castillo del Terror ("The Tower of Terror"), to distinguish it from other Steel cage matches held throughout the year such as the IWRG Guerra del Golfo ("Gulf War"), IWRG Guerra de Sexos ("War of the Sexes"), or IWRG Prisión Fatal ("Deadly Prison") shows. The Castillo del Terror shows, as well as the majority of the IWRG shows in general, are held in "Arena Naucalpan", owned by the promoters of IWRG and their main arena. The 2017 Castillo del Terror show was the 13th year in a row that IWRG has promoted a show under that name.

== Event ==
The El Castillo del Terror show featured five professional wrestling matches with different wrestlers involved in pre-existing scripted feuds, plots and storylines. Wrestlers portrayed themselves as either heels (referred to as rudos in Mexico, those that portray the "bad guys") or faces (técnicos in Mexico, the "good guy" characters) as they followed a series of tension-building events, which culminated in wrestling matches.

The semi-main event match was a six-man tag team match with the team of Black Warrior, Capo del Sur, and Máscara Año 2000 Jr. taking on the trio of Mr. Electro, Trauma II, and Villano V Jr. During the match Vilano V Jr. accidentally hit Mr. Electro, leading to their team losing the match. Afterward, Mr. Electro attacked Villano V Jr. with a steel folding chair, only for Villano V Jr.'s uncle Ray Mendoza Jr. and his brother Kaving came to his rescue, running off Mr. Electro.

For the 2017 version of the El Castillo del Terror match 10 wrestlers put their mask on the line in the main event steel cage match; Black Dragón, Capo del Norte, La Mosca, Oficial Spartan, Tortuga Leo, Trauma I, Violencia Jr. and Warrior Jr. For the first ten minutes of the match, none of the wrestlers were allowed to leave the cage. Once the ten minutes were up competitors could escape the cage by climbing up the side and over the top of the cage to safety. Eight wrestlers climbed out, leaving only Oficial Spartan and Black Dragón. At that point in time Spartan's tag team partner, Oficial Rayan came to the ring with a steel chair in hand. While not officially part of the match, Rayan climbed into the cage to help Spartan out. The two attacked Black Dragón, even trying to handcuff him to the steel cage to make it easy for Spartan to leave the cage. In the end, Black Dragón avoided the handcuffs and managed to climb out of the cage before either Los Oficiales Elite members could stop him. After the match, Oficial Spartan unmasked and revealed that his real name was Victor Montes Martinez, that he was 43 years old and had been a wrestler for 23 years at that point. After his unmasking it was confirmed that he had previously wrestled under the ring names "Omega" and "Arlequín Rojo" and been unmasked.

== Results ==
No.	Results	Stipulations
1	Guerrero 2000 and Lunatic Xtreme defeated Alas de Acero and Shadow Boy	Best two-out-of-three falls tag team match
2	Lady Cat and Ludark Shaitan defeated Dulce Luna and Lili Dark	Best two-out-of-three falls tag team match
3	Pantera I (c) defeated Arez	Best two-out-of-three falls match for the IWRG Intercontinental Lightweight Championship
4	Dinamic Black, Dragón Fly, Eterno, El Hijo del Alebrije, Imposible, and Tortuga Rafy defeated Heddi Karaoui, Hip Hop Man, Pantera del Japon, Pleitto Castillo, Taylor Wolf, and Veneno	12-man tag team match
5	Black Warrior, Capo del Sur, and Máscara Año 2000 Jr. defeated Mr. Electro, Trauma II, and Villano V Jr.	Best two-out-of-three falls six-man "Lucha Libre rules" tag team match
6	Black Dragón defeated Oficial Spartan; Also in the cage: La Mosca, Capo del Norte, Tortuga Leo, Trauma I, Violencia Jr. and Warrior Jr.	10-man El Castillo del Terror, Luchas de Apuestas, Mask vs. Mask Match
(c) / – the champion(s) heading into the match
