= El Castillo del Terror (2016) =

2016 International Wrestling Revolution Group event

- Official poster for the 2016 event
- Promotion: International Wrestling Revolution Group
- Date: November 2, 2016
- City: Naucalpan, State of Mexico, Mexico
- Venue: Arena Naucalpan

Event chronology
← Previous; Máscara vs. Máscara	Next → Rey del Ring

El Castillo del Terror chronology
← Previous; 2015	Next → 2017

El Castillo del Terror (2016) (Spanish for "The Tower of Terror") was a major professional wrestling event, the eleventh annual El Castillo del Terror event, produced by the International Wrestling Revolution Group (IWRG) that took place on November 2, 2018. IWRG has held their Castillo del Terror show since 2005, usually late in the year. As with the majority of the IWRG shows it took place at Arena Naucalpan in Naucalpan, State of Mexico, the home of IWRG. The main event was the eponymous Castillo del Terror Steel cage match where the last person eliminated would be forced to unmasked per the Lucha de Apuestas, or "bet match", stipulation. The third, fifth and sixth match was later shown on IWRG's weekly show on the Mexican AYM Sports network.

The main event was the eponymous Castillo del Terror Steel cage match where the last person eliminated would be forced to unmasked per the match stipulation. As a result of badly timed dive off the top of the cage Zatura was the last man in the cage and was forced to unmask. Due to several people leaving the cage at approximately the same time no one was officially given "credit" for the win although Emperador Azteca was visually the last to leave the cage. After the match Zatura unmasked and revealed his real name; Hector Neri. On the undercard Los Tortuga Ninjas ("The Ninja Turtles"; Leo, Mike and Rafy) (C) successfully defended the Distrito Federal Trios Championship against Los Infierno Rockers (Devil Rocker Machine Rocker and Soul Rocker)

== Background ==
Starting as far back as at least 2002, the Mexican wrestling promotion International Wrestling Revolution Group (IWRG; Sometimes referred to as Grupo Internacional Revolución in Spanish) has held several annual events where the main event was a multi-man steel cage match where the last wrestler left in the cage would be forced to either remove their wrestling mask or have their hair shaved off under Lucha de Apuestas, or "bet match", rules. From 2005 IWRG has promoted a fall show, around the Mexican Day of the Death, under the name El Castillo del Terror ("The Tower of Terror"), to distinguish it from other Steel cage matches held throughout the year such as the IWRG Guerra del Golfo ("Gulf War"), IWRG Guerra de Sexos ("War of the Sexes"), or IWRG Prisión Fatal ("Deadly Prison") shows. The Castillo del Terror shows, as well as the majority of the IWRG shows in general, are held in "Arena Naucalpan", owned by the promoters of IWRG and their main arena. The 2018 Castillo del Terror show will be the 14th year in a row that IWRG has promoted a show under that name.

== Event ==
The El Castillo del Terror event featured five professional wrestling matches with different wrestlers involved in pre-existing scripted feuds, plots and storylines. Wrestlers portrayed themselves as either heels (referred to as rudos in Mexico, those that portray the "bad guys") or faces (técnicos in Mexico, the "good guy" characters) as they followed a series of tension-building events, which culminated in wrestling matches.

For the fifth match of the night Trauma I was originally supposed to team with Sharlie Rockstar and El Hijo de Dos Caras, but for unexplained reasons they were replaced by Bobby Lee Jr. and Devil Rocker. Due to the substitution both Bobby Lee Jr. and Devil Rocker worked twice that night. The makeshift trio was not able to work together well enough to defeat the rudo team of Canis Lupus, Mr. Electro and Máscara Año 2000 Jr. who won the match. After the match ended both Mr. Electro and Canis Lupus made challenges to Trauma I to defend the IWRG Intercontinental Heavyweight Championship against either of them.

For the steel cage match main event all ten wrestlers were forced to remain in the cage for ten minutes before they would be allowed to try to escape the cage and thus save their mask. During the early portion of the match a couple of wrestlers attempted to climb the cage, but were quickly reminded of the rules. Early on a couple of wrestlers began to pair off, especially Imposible and Emperador Azteca, who fought throughout the match. At one point Imposible pulled Emperador Azteca's mask off, which would be a disqualification during a regular match, but not in the Castillo del Terror. Moments later Emperador Azteca returned the favor and pulled Imposible's mask off, then put Imposible's mask on himself to cover his face. Moments later Imposible put on Azteca's mask, with both wrestlers finishing the match wearing the other's mask. After the ten minutes were up several wrestlers tried to climb the cage, but each time their efforts were halted by the other wrestlers in the cage.

At one point Zatura was able to break away from the cage and climbed to the top without anyone stopping him. Once on the top of the cage Zatura decided to not leave the cage, instead he leapt off the top of the 15 foot tall cage, landing on the remaining nine wrestlers. After he landed Zatura began clutching his knee, indicating that he hurt himself during the dive. After some confusion among the remaining competitors, they all took advantage of the situation and decided to climb out of the cage to keep their masks safe. None of the competitors fought as they climbed up, leaving Zatura on the mat. The remaining nine wrestlers all left the cage around the same time, with Emperador Azteca being the last person to climb over and down to the floor. Due to the nature of the finish no official winner was announced for the 2016 Castillo del Terror match. As a result of the loss Zatura, while being strapped to a gurney, had to remove his mask and per lucha libre traditions had to reveal his real name. Zatura announced that his name was Hector Neri, that he was 30 years old and had been wrestling for 8 years at that point.

== Results ==
No.	Results	Stipulations
1^{D}	Aguilita Solitaria, Barbita Negra, and Panterita defeated Bracito de Oro, Felinito, and Guerrero del Bronx	Six-man tag team match
2^{D}	Alas de Acero, Black Dragón, and Dragón Fly defeated Araña de Plata, Demonio Infernal, and Skanda	Six-man tag team match
3	Los Tortugas Ninja (Leo, Mike, and Rafy) (c) defeated Los Infierno Rockers (Devil Rocker, Machine Rocker and Soul Rocker (Note: This team is not the same as the original Infierno Rockers who worked for Lucha Libre AAA Worldwide))	Six-man tag team match for the Distrito Federal Trios Championship
4^{D}	"Team Mexico" (Cerebro Negro, Dr. Cerebro, Eterno, and Freelance) defeated "El Resto del Mundo" (Hanaoka, Heddi Karaoui, Hip Hop Man, and Picudo Jr.)	Eight-man tag team match
5	Canis Lupus, Máscara Año 2000 Jr., and Mr. Electro defeated Bobby Lee Jr., Devil Rocker, and Trauma I	Six-man tag team match
6	Zathura lost the match Also in the match: El Hijo del Alebrije, Emperador Azteca, Tortuga Teelo, Diablo Jr., Killer Jr., Bobby Lee Jr., Violencia Jr., Imposible, and Pantera I	10-person El Castillo del Terror, Luchas de Apuestas, Mask vs. Mask Match
(c) / – the champion(s) heading into the match; D / – this was a dark match
