= El Castillo del Terror (2013) =

2013 International Wrestling Revolution Group event

- Official poster advertising the participants of the Castillo match
- Promotion: International Wrestling Revolution Group
- Date: November 3, 2013
- City: Naucalpan, State of Mexico
- Venue: Arena Naucalpan

Event chronology
← Previous; Caravana de Campeones	Next → Guerra Revolucionaria

El Castillo del Terror chronology
← Previous; 2012	Next → 2014

El Castillo del Terror (2013) was a professional wrestling event, the tenth annual El Castillo del Terror event produced by the International Wrestling Revolution Group (IWRG). IWRG has held a Castillo del Terror branded show annually since 2005, usually late in the year, making the 2013 edition the ninth overall event in the series. The event took place on November 3, 2013, at Arena Naucalpan in Naucalpan, State of Mexico, IWRG's main arena. The main event was the eponymous Castillo del Terror (Spanish for "Castle of Terror") Steel cage match where the last person eliminated was forced to unmasked per the match stipulation. In the end the ten-man match saw Golden Magic defeat Alan Extreme, forcing him to unmask after the match.

== Production ==
=== Background ===
Starting as far back as at least 2002, the Mexican wrestling promotion International Wrestling Revolution Group (IWRG; Sometimes referred to as Grupo Internacional Revolución in Spanish) has held several annual events where the main event was a multi-man steel cage match where the last wrestler left in the cage would be forced to either remove their wrestling mask or have their hair shaved off under Lucha de Apuestas, or "bet match", rules. From 2005 IWRG has promoted a fall show, around the Mexican Day of the Death, under the name El Castillo del Terror ("The Tower of Terror") to distinguish it from other Steel cage matches held throughout the year such as the IWRG Guerra del Golfo ("Gulf War"), IWRG Guerra de Sexos ("War of the Sexes") or IWRG Prison Fatal ("Deadly Prison") shows. The Castillo del Terror shows, as well as the majority of the IWRG shows in general, are held in "Arena Naucalpan", owned by the promoters of IWRG and their main arena. The 2013 Castillo del Terror show was the ninth year in a row that IWRG promoted a show under that name.

=== Storylines ===
The event featured five professional wrestling matches with different wrestlers involved in pre-existing scripted feuds, plots and storylines. Wrestlers were portrayed as either heels (referred to as rudos in Mexico, those that portray the "bad guys") or faces (técnicos in Mexico, the "good guy" characters) as they followed a series of tension-building events, which culminated in a wrestling match or series of matches. The Main Event was a 12-Man Steel Cage Match. The last two wrestlers who remained in the ring fought one on one in a Lucha de Apuestas Match ("Bet match"), wagering their mask on the outcome of the match. The event included wrestlers from International Wrestling Revolution Group (IWRG) as well as a number of Mexican freelance wrestlers.

The main event, Castillo del Terror match started with all ten wrestlers fighting inside the steel cage for ten full minutes before they were even allowed to attempt to escape the cage. Moments after the 10-minute mark Pirata Morgan, Jr. was the first man to crawl out of the cage, followed closely by Saruman, Picudo, Jr., El Hijo de Máscara Año 2000, Trauma II, Canis Lupus and Relampago left the cage leaving Oficial 911, Golden Magic and Alan Extreme as the last three men in the cage. The veteran Oficial 911 took advantage of Alan Extreme fighting Golden Magic, allowing him to climb out of the ring. In the closing moments of the match Golden Magic was able to escape the cage, leaving Alan Extreme behind. Extreme was to force unmask as a result of the loss as per Lucha Libre traditions and announced his birth name in the process.

== Results ==
No.	Results	Stipulations
1	Bracito de Plata and Latigo defeated Mini Multifacético and Voladorcito	Tag team match
2	Ciclon Black, Douki and Guerrero Mixtico, Jr. defeated Dragon Celestial, Fulgor II and Imposible – two falls to none	Best two-out-of-three falls six-man Lucha Libre rules match
3	Apolo Estrada, Jr., Decnis and Fuerza Guerrera defeated Dr. Cerebro, Trauma I and Veneno – two falls to one	Best two-out-of-three falls six-man Lucha Libre rules match
4	Tony Rivera (with Guerrero Mixtico Jr.) defeated Bombero Infernal (with Matrix, Jr.) – two falls to one	Best two-out-of three falls match Luchas de Apuestas, hair vs. hair match.
5	Golden Magic defeated Alan Extreme; Also in the match: Canis Lupus, El Hijo de Máscara Año 2000, Oficial 911, Picudo, Jr., Pirata Morgan, Jr., Relampago, Saruman and Trauma II	El Castillo del Terror Luchas de Apuestas, Mask vs. Mask match.

=== Order of escape ===
1. Pirata Morgan, Jr.
2. Saruman
3. Picudo, Jr.
4. El Hijo de Máscara Año 2000
5. Trauma II
6. Canis Lupus
7. Relampago
8. Oficial 911
9. Golden Magic
