= El Castillo del Terror (2000) =

2000 International Wrestling Revolution Group event

- Promotion: International Wrestling Revolution Group
- Date: November 2, 2000
- City: Naucalpan, State of Mexico
- Venue: Arena Naucalpan

Event chronology
← Previous; Prison Fatal	Next → Arena Naucalpan 23rd Anniversary Show

IWRG El Castillo del Terror chronology
← Previous; First	Next → 2002

The 2000 El Castillo del Terror (Spanish for "The Tower of Terror") was a major lucha libre event produced and scripted by the Mexican International Wrestling Revolution Group (IWRG) professional wrestling promotion on November 2, 2000. The 2000 El Castillo del Terror was the first ever IWRG El Castillo del Terror event held, starting an annual tradition for the promotion. The main event was the eponymous Castillo del Terror (Spanish for "Tower of Terror") steel cage match where the last person eliminated would be forcibly unmasked or have his hair shaved off as a result.

The main event saw the luchador enmascarado (masked wrestler) Super Mega being the last man in the steel cage and thus was forced to unmask and reveal his birth name – Juan Manuel Segura Hernández to the audience. The rest of the show featured four matches, including one for the IWRG Intercontinental Heavyweight Championship where champion Scorpio Jr. successfully defended against Villano IV two falls to one.

== Production ==
=== Background ===
The Mexican wrestling promotion International Wrestling Revolution Group (IWRG, sometimes referred to as Grupo Internacional Revolución in Spanish) has a long-standing history of holding major events focused on a multi-man steel cage match where the last wrestler left in the cage would be forced to either remove their wrestling mask or have their hair shaved off under Lucha de Apuestas, or "bet match", rules. Starting in the year 2000 IWRG has promoted a fall show, around the Mexican Day of the Death, under the name El Castillo del Terror ("The Tower of Terror"), creating an annual event on their major show calendar that has been held each year since 2002.

The El Castillo del Terror event is one of several annual steel cage match shows that IWRG holds throughout the year such as the IWRG Guerra del Golfo ("Gulf War"), IWRG Guerra de Sexos ("War of the Sexes"), or IWRG Prison Fatal ("Deadly Prison") shows. The Castillo del Terror shows, as well as the majority of the IWRG shows in general, are held in Arena Naucalpan, owned by the promoters of IWRG and their main arena. In the El Castillo del Terror match a varying number of wrestlers start out in the cage and have to remain inside the cage, fighting each other for ten minutes before they are allowed to try to escape the match. Wrestlers who climb over the top of the steel cage and touch the floor with both feet are deemed to have escaped the cage and thus escaped the Lucha de Apuestas, or "bet match", stipulation. The last wrestler in the cage is forced to either unmask (if masked) and state his given name, or (if unmasked) is forced to have all his hair shaved off as per lucha libre traditions.

=== Storylines ===
The event featured five professional wrestling matches with different wrestlers involved in pre-existing scripted feuds, plots and storylines. Wrestlers were portrayed as either heels (referred to as rudos in Mexico, those that portray the "bad guys") or faces (técnicos in Mexico, the "good guy" characters) as they followed a series of tension-building events, which culminated in a wrestling match or series of matches.

While Scorpio Jr. was under contract with Consejo Mundial de Lucha Libre (CMLL), CMLL's working relationship with IWRG allowed Scorpio Jr. to work in Naucalpan on a regular bais in the late 1990s and early 2000s. On December 16, 1999 Scorpio Jr. defeated Super Parka to win the IWRG Intercontinental Heavyweight Championship, becoming the fourth overall wrestler to win the championship since its inception in 1997. In the subsequent year Scorpio Jr. successfully defended the championship against Moon Walker, Villano IV Mr. Niebla and Silver King.

== Event ==
In the semi-main event Scorpio Jr. successfully defended the IWRG Intercontinental Heavyweight Championship against Villano IV by winning the match two falls to one, taking the first and the last fall of the event. This marked the fifth successful championship defense in Scorpio Jr.'s reign.

Records are unclear on how many wrestlers actually participated in the main event. The reference for 2000/2001 merely states that Super Mega lost the match and that his Los Megas tag team partner Mega was also in the match. As the last wrestler in the cage Super Mega was forced to remove his mask and state his given name to the crowd, Juan Manuel Segura Hernández, who at the time was 22 years old and had been a professional wrestler for eight years at the time.

== Aftermath ==
Mega and the unmasked Super Mega continued to team up in 2001, adding Ultra Mega to the team as well making Los Megas a regular trio. On August 2, 2001 Los Megas defeated Los Oficiales (Guardia, Oficial and Vigilante) to win the Distrito Federal Trios Championship. The trio would hold on to the championship until early 2002, where they lost the belts to Dr. Cerebro, Cirujano and Paramedico. At that point Super Mega was replaced by Omega as the man behind the Super Mega character began working for Consejo Mundial de Lucha Libre as Último Vampiro, the same name he had used prior to becoming Super Mega.

After his successful championship against Villano IV, Scorpio Jr. would go on to fend off challenges from Nicho El Millonario, El Dandy, Rambo and El Enterrador in 2001. His reign ended on August 16, 2001 when he lost to Tinieblas Jr. Scorpio would regain the championship in 2002, and also hold it for a third time in 2005.

== Results ==
No.	Results	Stipulations
1	Zonik defeated Súper Atlas	Best two-out-of-three-falls singles match
2	Bestia Rubia and Paramédico defeated Talisman 2000 and Talismán Jr.	Best two-out-of-three-falls tag team match
3	Fantasy, Star Boy and Mike Segura defeated Bombero Infernal, Dr. Cerebro and El Hijo del Gladiador	Best two-out-of-three falls six-man tag team match
4	Scorpio Jr. (c) defeated Villano IV	Best two-out-of-three-falls singles match for the IWRG Intercontinental Heavyweight Championship
5	Super Mega lost. Also in the match Mega, Último Vampiro, Super Parka, El Felino, Black Dragón, Enterrador, Oficial, Hijo de Lizmark, and Blue Panther	multi-man El Castillo del Terror Luchas de Apuestas, mask or hair match
(c) / – the champion(s) heading into the match
