= El Castillo del Terror (2005) =

2005 International Wrestling Revolution Group event

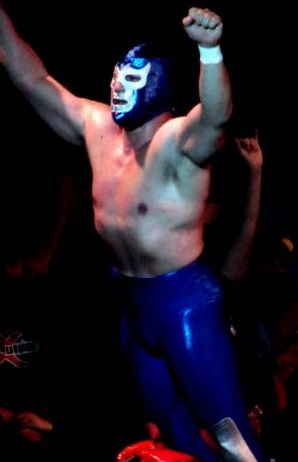
- Blue Demon, Jr. one of ten men competing in that year's Castillo del Terror match
- Promotion: International Wrestling Revolution Group
- Date: November 3, 2005
- City: Naucalpan, State of Mexico
- Venue: Arena Naucalpan

Event chronology
← Previous; La Copa Black Shadow	Next → Rey del Ring

IWRG El Castillo del Terror chronology
← Previous; 2004	Next → 2006

El Castillo del Terror (2005) was the first annual El Castillo del Terror professional wrestling event produced by the International Wrestling Revolution Group. It took place on November 3, 2005, at Arena Naucalpan in Naucalpan, State of Mexico. The show featured the eponymous main event match; a 10-man Steel Cage Match where the last two men in the cage were forced to wrestle each other and the loser would be forced to unmask or have his hair shaved off under Luchas de Apuestas, or "Bet rules". For the 2005 event Blue Demon, Jr., Cerebro Negro, Dr. Wagner, Jr., El Fantasma, Jr. and Lizmark, Jr. risked their mask while Bestia Salvaje, Masada, Shigeo Okumura, Universo 2000 and Veneno risked their hair on the outcome of the match. Cerebro Negro and Masada were the final two competitors in the cage and had to face off, with Masada pinning Cerebro Negro to force him to unmask.

== Production ==
=== Background ===
Starting as far back as at least 2000, the Mexican wrestling promotion International Wrestling Revolution Group (IWRG; Sometimes referred to as Grupo Internacional Revolución in Spanish) has held several annual events where the main event was a multi-man steel cage match where the last wrestler left in the cage would be forced to either remove their wrestling mask or have their hair shaved off under Lucha de Apuestas, or "bet match", rules. From 2005 IWRG has promoted a fall show, around the Mexican Day of the Death, under the name El Castillo del Terror ("The Tower of Terror") to distinguish it from other Steel cage matches held throughout the year such as the IWRG Guerra del Golfo ("Gulf War"), IWRG Guerra de Sexos ("War of the Sexes") or IWRG Prison Fatal ("Deadly Prison") shows. The Castillo del Terror shows, as well as the majority of the IWRG shows in general, are held in "Arena Naucalpan", owned by the promoters of IWRG and their main arena. The 2006 Castillo del Terror show was the first that IWRG promoted a show under that name.

=== Storylines ===
The event featured five professional wrestling matches with different wrestlers involved in pre-existing scripted feuds, plots and storylines. Wrestlers were portrayed as either heels (referred to as rudos in Mexico, those that portray the "bad guys") or faces (técnicos in Mexico, the "good guy" characters) as they followed a series of tension-building events, which culminated in a wrestling match or series of matches.

== Results ==
No.	Results	Stipulations
1	Freesbe defeated Conde Negro	Singles Match
2	Black Jaguar and Súper Colt defeated Antaris and Tiger Kid	Tag Team Match
3	Los Jinetes de Apocalipsis (Kaleth, Némesis and Pirata Morgan, Jr.) defeated Aquiles, Panterita and Ultra Mega	Six-Man Tag Team Match
4	El Sagrado, Matrix and Suicida defeated Cyborg, El Enterrador and El Pantera	Six-Man Tag Team Match
5	Masada defeated Cerebro Negro; Also in the match: Bestia Salvaje, Blue Demon, Jr., Dr. Wagner, Jr., El Fantasma, Jr., Lizmark, Jr., Shigeo Okumura, Universo 2000 and Veneno defeated	10-man El Castillo del Terror Luchas de Apuestas, Mask vs. Hair Match
