= Shadow V =

Shadow V may refer to

- nickname of Ari Romero, a Mexican wrestler
- Shadow V (fishing boat), a fishing boat destroyed during the murder of Louis Mountbatten and others
