= Octagón Jr. =

Mexican, or masked professional wrestler (born 1990)

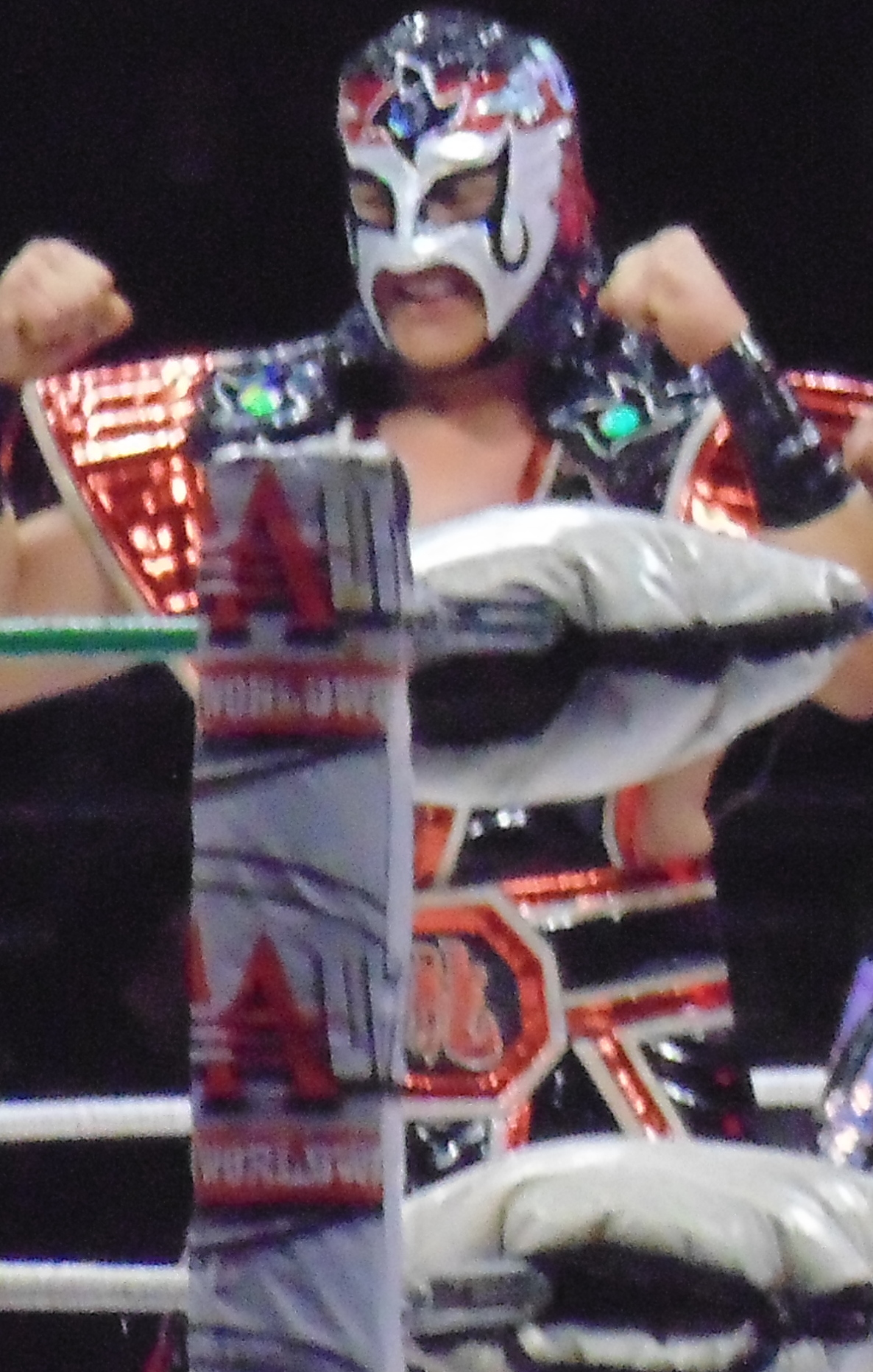
- Octagón Jr. in 2026

Personal information
- Born: Unrevealed; July 18, 1990 (age 36) State of Mexico, Mexico

Professional wrestling career
- Ring names: Golden Magic; Magia Jr.; Brazo Metálico; Octagón Jr.
- Billed height: 168 cm (5 ft 6 in)
- Billed weight: 84 kg (185 lb)
- Billed from: México City, México

Octagón Jr (born July 18, 1990) is a Mexican professional wrestler. He is signed to WWE and Lucha Libre AAA Worldwide (AAA). He is a former AAA World Trios Champion and AAA Latin American Champion.

From 2011 through 2016 he was a regular for promotions Consejo Mundial de Lucha Libre (CMLL) and International Wrestling Revolution Group (IWRG). In the latter, he won the IWRG Intercontinental Welterweight Championship twice and the IWRG Junior de Juniors Championship as well as coming away victorious at several of their annual El Castillo del Terror ("The Tower of Terror") events. In Lucha Libre Elite (LLE) he portrayed a tecnico (heroic) character.

His real name is not a matter of public record, as is often the case with masked wrestlers in Mexico where their private lives are kept a secret from the wrestling fans. Initially worked as Brazo Metálico ("Metal Arm"), a storyline member of the Alvarado wrestling family, more specifically a son of Brazo de Plata. He is the son of professional wrestler Mr. Magia and at one pointed wrestled as Magia Jr., and later, as Golden Magic.

== Personal life ==
The wrestler who would later become known under the ring name Golden Magic was born on July 18, 1990, son of professional wrestler Mr. Magia, who also had a hand in training his son when he wanted to become a professional wrestler.

== Professional wrestling career ==
He made his debut at some point before 2010, adopting the ring name Brazo Metálico ("Metal Arm"), wearing the trademark "double arm flex" mask design of Los Brazos and was presented as a son of Brazo de Plata, one of several 2nd generation Brazos that were not actually a member of the Alvarado wrestling family. As Brazo Metálico he quickly began working for a number of smaller Mexican wrestling promotions such as International Wrestling Revolution Group (IWRG) and Alianca Universal de Lucha Libre (AULL). In IWRG he teamed with Brazo de Platino, who according to the storyline was his uncle, as they competed in the 2012 Copa Higher Power; the team was eliminated by Comando Negro and Keshin Black in the first round. He would also team with other supposed family members such as Brazo de Plata Jr. and El Brazo Jr. in AULL where they competed in a 12-man "losers advance" tournament where they defeated the team of Rey Krimen, Sepulturero, Terry 2000, Robin Maravilla, Ultimo Vampiro and Yakuza. In April 2010 IWRG stripped Los Terribles Cerebros (Black Terry, Cerebro Negro and Dr. Cerebro) of the Distrito Federal Trios Championship due to Cerebro Negro electing to work a Desastre Total Ultraviolento (DTU) on the same day as an IWRG show, forcing IWRG to abandon the planned match. IWRG held an eight-team, one-night single elimination tournament from April 15 to April 29, 2010, to crown the new champions. In the first round the team of Brazo de Plata, Brazo de Plata Jr. and Brazo Metálico defeated La Ola Maldita ("The Bad Wave"; Bombero Infernal, Maldito Jr. and Samoth) in the first round but l ost to the team of Hijo de Máscara Año 2000, Máscara Año 2000 and Máscara Año 2000 Jr. to be eliminated from the tournament.

In early 2011 he gave up the Brazo character and revealed that he was actually the son of Mr. Magia, a mid-level wrestler who was primarily active in the late 1990s, and not the son of Brazo de Plata. He began working as the enmascarado (masked) character Magia Jr. on the Mexican Independent Circuit for a few months.

=== International Wrestling Revolution Group (2011–2016) ===
In the spring of 2011 he decided to make yet another character change, becoming "Golden Magic" - a tecnico - in IWRG. His first major appearance for IWRG came on March 4, 2011, at IWRG's annual Guerrea del Golfo event, Golden Magic, Eterno and Freelance lost to the team of Carta Brava Jr., El Pollo Asesino and El Fresero Jr. A month later he wrestled on IWRG's annual Guerra Revolucionaria show, teaming with fellow rookies Black Sky and Dinamic Black as they lost to the team of Oficial Fierro, Hammer and Magnifico, two falls to one. He also branched out and worked for other Mexican promotions, such as Los Perros del Mal, working that promotion's third anniversary show on May 29, 2011, where he, El Ángel, Hagen and Skayde lost to Ek Balam, Guerrero Negro and La Ola Maldita (Maldito Jr. and Samoth). His first real success as Golden Magic came when he won the 15th Torneo FILL (short for Futuro Idolos de Lucha Libre, "Future Idols of Wrestling", IWRG's wrestling school) by defeating wrestlers such as Alan Extreme, Centvrión, Dinamic Black and Eterno. Golden Magic followed this up by also winning the 17th Torneo FILL outlasting 15 other wrestlers including Kortiz and Taurus. On September 8, 2011, Golden Magic was one of eight participants in a tournament for the vacant IWRG Intercontinental Welterweight Championship. He defeated Trauma II in the first round, Apolo Estrada Jr. in the second round and finally Bestia 666 to become the new Welterweight Champion, marking the first championship victory of his wrestling career. Golden Magic teamed up with other IWRG mid-card tecnicos like Dinamic Black, Veneno, El Pantera and El Hijo del Pantera to form a group called Los Revolucionarios ("The Revolutionaries). Golden Magic, Veneno and Dinamic Black represented Los Revolucionarios in a one night Trios tournament, defeatingLas Ladies de Naucalpan (Bugambilia del Norte, La Diva Salvaje and Miss Gaviota) but lost to Los Oficiales (Oficial 911, Oficial AK-47 & Oficial Spartan) in the finals of the tournament. He had his first successful Welterweight title defense on September 29, 2011 when he defeated Carta Brava Jr. at Arena Naucalpan The following month he also made a successful title defense against Bestia 666. On November 3, 2011 Golden Magic was one of 10 men to put his mask on the line in the 2011 El Castillo del Terror ("Castle of Terror") event along with King Drako, Carta Brava Jr., El Hijo de L.A. Park, El Hijo de Máscara Año 2000, Machin, Oficial 911, Oficial Spartan, Super Nova and Zumbi. The match came down to Golden Magic and King Drako as everyone else had escaped the cage, when Golden Magic left as well King Drako was forced to unmask and Golden Magic was given credit with the Lucha de Apuesta, or "bet match", victory. A few weeks later he challenged for the Perros del Mal Light Heavyweight Championship, in a match that saw Super Nova take the victory over Bestia 666. On December 22, 2011, at IWRG's Arena Naucalpan 34th Anniversary Show Golden Magic lost the IWRG Intercontinental Welterweight Championship to Eterno in a match where Eterno's WWS Welterweight Championship was also on the line.

In 2012 Golden Magic made his debut for El Hijo del Santo's Todo X el Todo promotion at a show in Mexico city where Alan Extreme, Carta Brava Jr. and Imposible defeated Golden Magic, Dinamic Black and Saurman. On August 5, 2012, on the undercard of IWRG's 2012 Gran Cruzada show Carta Brava Jr. and Violencia Jr. defeated Freelance and Golden Magic in a tag team match. A week later, on August 12, Golden Magic defeatef long-time rival Eterno to win the WWS Welterweight Championship as part of IWRG's Caravan de Campeones show. He lost the WWS Championship only 11 days later as Chicano defeated him for the championship on August 23, 2012. Golden Magic and fellow Revolucionario Veneno teamed up with Chico Che to defeat the team of Tomahawk, Apolo Estrada Jr. and Black Terry on the undercard of IWRG's 2013 Prison Fatal show. On November 2, 2014, Golden Magic won his third Castillo del Terror, forcing Kenshi Kabuki to unmask. On August 23, 2015, Golden Magic defeated Super Nova to win the IWRG Junior de Juniors Championship for the first time. Golden Magic was involved in the controversial ending to the 2015 El Castillo del Terror. The match came down to Golden Magic and El Golpeador, both clinging to the outside of the steel cage, when El Golpeador slipped and fell off the cage. Normally that would mean El Golpeador would have won because he touched the floor first, but he was supposed to lose the match and his mask so the referee and IWRG rules that Golden Magic won the match. The IWRG crowd turned on Golden Magic after that, booing him even though he worked as a tecnico. The company did not book Golden Magic again until March 27, 2016, where they set up a Junior de Juniors championship match up during their Rebelión de los Juniors show. On March 27, 2016, Golden Magc lost the Junior de Junior Championship to Danny Casas.

=== Lucha Libre Elite (2015–2018) ===
In late 2015 Golden Magic began making regular appearances for Lucha Libre Elite (LLE), a promotion that worked closely together with Consejo Mundial de Lucha Libre ("World Wrestling Council"; CMLL), the world's oldest wrestling promotion and would often work with CMLL wrestlers. On March 29, Golden Magic made his actual CMLLL debut taking part in their annual Gran Alternativa tournament, teaming with veteran wrestler Rush. The team defeated Warrior Steel and Mr. Niebla in the first round, but lost to Esfinge and Volador Jr. when Rush pulled Esfinge's mask off and got the team disqualified.

=== Lucha Libre AAA Worldwide / WWE (2018–present) ===
On June 3, 2018, Magic made his debut in Lucha Libre AAA Worldwide at Verano de Escándalo in a 6-Way Match which was won by Aero Star. Other competitors in the match included Drago, Sammy Guevara, Australian Suicide, and Darby Allin. On July 21 in AAA vs. Elite teaming with Laredo Kid as representative of Liga Elite they were defeated before the Team AAA (Rey Escorpión and Texano Jr.). At AAA's biggest show of the year, Triplemanía XXVI, Magic and Kid where defeated versus Mexablood (Bandido and Flamita) where they also got involved with Team AAA (Aero Star and Drago) and Team Impact! (DJZ and Andrew Everett) to become the #1 contenders for the AAA World Tag Team Championship.

On March 16, 2019, Magic wrestled at Rey de Reyes in scramble match that was won by Aero Star. Over time, Magic sometimes teamed up with El Hijo del Vikingo and Myzteziz Jr. in different events, until at the end of July, La Parka appointed as the new member of Los Jinetes del Aire ("The Air Riders") who replaces Laredo Kid. On August 3 at Triplemanía XXVII, Magic accompanied with Vikingo and Myzteziz as Los Jinetes del Aire defeated El Nuevo Poder del Norte (Carta Brava Jr., Tito Santana and Mocho Cota Jr.) and Las Fresas Salvajes (Pimpinela Escarlata, Mamba, and Máximo) to win the AAA World Trios Championship for the first time in his career.

On June 7, 2025, under the Octagón Jr. name, he made his debut for WWE, the parent promotion of AAA, at the WWE and AAA event Worlds Collide, teaming up with Aero Star and Mr. Iguana to defeat Lince Dorado and Latino World Order (Cruz Del Toro and Dragon Lee) in a six-man tag team match. Later that night at Money in the Bank, he challenged Dominik Mysterio for the Intercontinental Championship, but failed to win the title after interference from Liv Morgan.

=== Impact Wrestling / Total Nonstop Action Wrestling (2019–2025) ===
On August 30, 2019, Magic made his debut for Impact Wrestling as part of the promotion's partnership with AAA, defeated Taurus, TJP and Trey.

On March 14, 2025, under the Octagón Jr. name, he returned to TNA at Sacrifice and began to team with Laredo as the Aztec Warriors.

== Championships and accomplishments ==
- International Wrestling Revolution Group
  - IWRG Intercontinental Welterweight Championship (2 times)
  - IWRG Junior de Juniors Championship (1 time)
  - WWS World Welterweight Championship (1 time)
  - Copa High Power (2014) - with Alan Extreme, Avisman, Imposible, Relámpago and Veneno
- Lucha Libre AAA Worldwide
  - AAA Latin American Championship (1 time)
  - AAA World Trios Championship (1 time) – with El Hijo del Vikingo & Myzteziz Jr.
  - Copa Bardahl (2024)
- Major League Wrestling
  - MLW Caribbean Heavyweight Championship (1 time)
- Pro Wrestling Illustrated
  - Ranked No. 76 of the top 500 singles wrestlers in the PWI 500 in 2024

== Lucha de Apuesta record ==
Winner (wager)	Loser (wager)	Location	Event	Date	Notes
Golden Magic (mask)	King Drako (mask)	Naucalpan, State of Mexico	Castillo del Terror	November 3, 2011	(Note: Multi-Man Steel Cage Match that also included Carta Brava Jr., El Hijo de L.A. Park, El Hijo de Máscara Año 2000, Machin, Oficial 911, Oficial Spartan, Super Nova and Zumbi)
Golden Magic (mask)	Alan Extreme (mask)	Naucalpan, State of Mexico	Castillo del Terror	November 3, 2013	(Note: Multi-Man Steel Cage Match that also included Canis Lupus, El Hijo de Máscara Año 2000, Oficial 911, Picudo Jr., Pirata Morgan Jr., Relámpago, Saruman and Trauma II)
Golden Magic (mask) and El Hijo de Pirata Morgan (hair)	Mosco X-Fly (hair) and Oficial 911 (mask)	Naucalpan, State of Mexico	Arena Naucalpan 36th Anniversary Show	December 19, 2013	(Note: Elimination tag team match, also involving the team of Oficial Fierro and Trauma II.)
Golden Magic (mask)	Kenshi Kabuki (mask)	Naucalpan, State of Mexico	Castillo del Terror	November 2, 2014	(Note: Multi-Man Steel Cage Match that also included Canis Lupus, Emperador Azteca, Imposible, Metaleón, Relámpago, Trauma II, Universo 2000 Jr., Violencia Jr.)
Canis Lupus (mask)	Golden Magic (Championship)	Naucalpan, State of Mexico	IWRG Live event	November 16, 2014	
Golden Magic (mask)	El Golpeador (mask)	Naucalpan, State of Mexico	Castillo del Terror	November 1, 2015	(Note: Multi-Man Steel Cage Match that also included Astro, Canis Lupus, El Hijo del Pantera, Rafy, Rayan, Super Nova, Trauma I and Trauma II)
