= Los Arlequíns =

Professional wrestling group

Stable
- Members: Arlequín Amarillo; Arlequín Rojo; Arlequín Verde; Arlequín Negro I Arlequín Negro II
- Debut: 2008
- Disbanded: 2010

Los Arlequíns (Spanish for "The Harlequins") was a Mexican professional wrestling group, called a stable, who worked as a rudo (term used for wrestlers who portray the "Bad guys") faction. All members of the group started out as masked wrestlers, but several members lost their masks before the group was disbanded.

== History ==
Los Arlequíns was a wrestling "concept" team, similar to the concept of a boy band, where several wrestlers are joined up and given a common ring identity; in this case all members of the group were based on the Harlequin character. The "concept" teams are widely used in Mexico, especially in International Wrestling Revolution Group (IWRG) which often creates various concept teams to see if they become popular with the fans. Most concept groups only last a short time, but at times a concept is so successful that it works for a number of years. In 2008 IWRG officials decided to repackage IWRG wrestlers Manuel Mejia (formerly known as Capitan Sangre), Martin Hernandez Barron (previously known as Cyborg and other ring names) and Victor Manuel Montés, (formerly known as Omega among other names) and give them new rudo, or "bad guy", masked characters. Mejia was the first of the Arlequíns to make his debut, initially working simply as Arlequín, often teaming with Hijo de Pierroth and Pierroth II, two wrestlers who also had a yellow and black "Harlequin" design in their wrestling gear. The trio unsuccessfully challenged Los Oficiales (Oficial 911. Oficial AK-47 and Oficial Fierro) for the IWRG Intercontinental Trios Championship. Arlequín and Hijo del Pierroth also unsuccessfully challenged Los Junior Dinamitas (Hijo de Cien Caras and Máscara Año 2000, Jr.) for their IWRG Intercontinental Tag Team Championship, but once again came up short.

In 2008 IWRG introduced two additional Arlequín characters, forcing Meija modify his name to Arlequín Amarillo ("Yellow Harlequin") when Hernandez and Montés were added to the group as Arlequín Verde ("Green Harlequin") and Arlequín Rojo ("Red Harlequin") respectively. The trio all competed individually in the 2009 Rey del Ring tournament, but none of them won the 30 man tournament. On August 16, 2009, Arlequín Amarillo risked his mask on the outcome of a 10-man steel cage match where the last man in the cage would be forced to unmask or have their hair shaved off under Luchas de Apuestas rules. In the end Amarillo kept his mask safe as he escaped the cage. A few months later Arlequín Amarillo was one of 10 wrestlers their mask on the line under Lucha de Apuesta, rules in IWRG's annual El Castillo del Terror ("The Castle of Terror") match. The match came down to Máscara Año 2000, Jr. and Arlequin as the final two wrestlers, with Máscara Año 2000, Jr. pinning his opponent to keep his mask safe. The following month Arlequín Amarillo lost yet another steel cage match, this time to Oficial AK-47 and was forced to have his hair shaved off after the match.

On September 16, 2009, Arlequín Rojo participated in IWRG's annual Guerra del Golfo event and lost the qualifying steel cage match, which put him in a match against Rigo where both wrestler's masks were on the line. Rigo won the match and the rights to remove Arlequín Rojo's mask. A few weeks later Arlequín Amarillo and Rojo lost to the team of Rigo and Chico Che, which meant that both unmasked Arlequíns had their hair shaved off as well. In late 2009 another Arlequín character was introduced, Arlequín Negro ("Black Arlequin") to make up for the fact that Arlequín Verde stopped appearing under that name and mask in IWRG. Arlequín Negro made his debut in a "Losers advance", Ruleta de la Muerte (Spanish for "Roulette of Death") tournament, in which tag teams face off in a single-elimination tournament, but unlike traditional tournaments, it is the losing team that advances in the tournament and the losing team in the finals would be forced to face off against each other in a Luchas de Apuestas match. the team lost in the first round to advance in the tournament, but defeated Oficial AK-47 and Chico Che in the second round to keep their masks safe. In early 2010 Arlequín Negro broke his leg in an accident, which forced him to retire. He was quietly replaced a few months later by someone else wearing the Arlequín Negro mask. By the end of 2010 the Los Arlequíns concept was slowly being phased out, the final chapter in the storyline came at the 2010 El Castillo del Terror show where Arlequín Negro lost to Comando Negro and was forced to unmask. After the match he revealed that his birth name was Jorge Hérnandez Gomez. A week after the Castillo del Terror loss Los Arlequíns (Amarillo, Negro and Rojo) defeated La Ola Negra ("The Black Wave"; Comando Negro, Guerrero Negro and Magia Negra), but the storyline ended there as the Los Arlequíns concept was abandoned.

== Luchas de Apuestas record ==
Luchas de Apuestas participation while members of Los Arlequins are listed.

Winner (wager)	Loser (wager)	Location	Event	Date	Notes
Máscara Año 2000 Jr. (mask)	Arlequin Amarillo (mask)	Naucalpan, Mexico State	El Castillo del Terror	November 2, 2008	(Note: Steel Cage match that also included El Hijo de Cien Caras, Fantasma de la Ópera, Multifacético, El Hijo de Aníbal, Ultraman, Jr., Yack, Pendulo, El Hijo del Pierroth.)
Oficial AK-47 (mask)	Arlequin Amarillo (hair)	Naucalpan, Mexico State	IWRG show	December 21, 2008	(Note: Multi-man Steel Cage match that also included Scorpio, Jr., Fuerza Guerrera, Tetsuya, Cerebro Negro, Pierroth II, Zumbido, Máscara Año 2000 and Multifacético.)
Rigo (hair)	Arlequín Rojo (mask)	Naucalpan, Mexico State	Guerra del Golfo	September 16, 2009	
Rigo and Chico Che (hair)	Arlequín Amarillo and Arlequín Rojo (hair)	Naucalpan, Mexico State	IWRG show	September 25, 2009	
Comando Negro (mask)	Arlequín Negro II (mask)	Naucalpan, Mexico State	El Castillo del Terror	November 4, 2010	
