= Rafael Herbert Reyes =

Dominican born professional wrestler (born 1967)

Personal information
- Born: Rafael Herbert Reyes; November 7, 1967 (age 58) Dominican Republic

Professional wrestling career
- Ring name(s): Bunny Black; Kendo Star; Salsero; Sugryva; Super Rabbit; Hijo del Pierroth; YAMADA; Pierko el Boricua; El Limón
- Trained by: Robotman; Barba Negra; Villano I As Charro; Charro de Jalisco
- Debut: 1981

Rafael Herbert Reyes (born November 7, 1967) is a Dominican born professional wrestler, who has worked most of his career in Mexico. Reyes has used many ring names during his career, most notably Kendo Star, El Salsero, Pierko el Boricua and currently wrestles as the mask character Hijo del Pierroth or El Limón. Reyes is a former holder of the Mexican National Welterweight Championship, having won it as "El Salsero" while working for the Asistencia Asesoría y Administración (AAA) promotion. Reyes changed his name from Hijo del Pierroth to Pierko el Boricua after Pierroth, Jr. withdrew his endorsement for the various Pierroths in wrestling.

== Professional wrestling career ==
Rafael Reyes made his professional wrestling debut in 1981 under the name "Bunny Black", a name that Reyes used throughout the 1980s. In the early 1990s he adopted the name "Kendo Star", a masked wrestler based on the professional wrestler Kendo who is Reyes' uncle and gave him permission to use the name. In 1993 Reyes joined Asistencia Asesoría y Administración (AAA) and was given a new gimmick, El Salsero (Spanish for "The Salsa Dancer"), a comedy tecnico (face or "good guy" character). El Salsero participated in the first ever Triplemanía event where he teamed with Winners and Super Caló to defeat May Flowers, Rudy Reyna, and Baby Sharon. Salseo was unmasked after losing a Luchas de Apuestas to Juventud Guerrera on October 20, 1996 on a show in Ciudad Juárez, Chihuahua. On February 16, 1997 El Salsero defeated Psicosis to win the Mexican National Welterweight Championship. Salsero held the title for four months without a single title defense before losing the title to Nygma ending Reyes' only professional wrestling championship reign to date.

In 2005 Reyes changed his gimmick once more as he became the second man to wrestle as Hijo del Pierroth (Spanish for "Son of Pierroth") as the original Hijo del Pierroth (Pierroth, Jr.'s real life son) was injured and had to retire from wrestling. As Hijo del Pierroth Reyes was part of Pierroth, Jr.'s Consejo Mundial de Lucha Libre (CMLL) based group Los Boricuas (slang for "The Puerto Ricans"). In 2008 Pierroth, Jr. withdrew his approval of all wrestlers using the Pierroth name, including Reyes. Following this Reyes adopted a new mask, inspired by Pierroth's yellow and black mask, but with gold instead of yellow and slight changes to the design. He also changes his ring name to Pierko el Boricua, a name he has used ever since. On December 13, 2009 Pierko el Boriqua lost a Lucha de Apuesta match to Silver Star and was forced to unmask. He has since then worked on the yellow and black mask again, although he has not been billed as Pierko, instead he resumed working as "Hijo del Pierroth". In July, 2010 he appeared on the first ever Lucha Libre: Masked Warriors on MTV2, he wore his usual "Pierko el Boriqua" mask and outfit but worked under the name El Limón.

== Championships and accomplishments ==
- Consejo Mundial de Lucha Libre

- Mexican National Welterweight Championship (1 time)

== Luchas de Apuestas record ==
Winner (wager)	Loser (wager)	Location	Event	Date	Notes
El Chacal (hair)	Bunny Black (hair)	Poza Rica, Veracruz	Live event	June 2, 1983	
Bunny Black (hair)	Terrestre (hair)	Poza Rica, Veracruz	Live event	August 24, 1983	
Bunny Black (hair)	Willy Ramírez (hair)	N/A	Live event	August 28, 1983	
El Puma (hair)	Bunny Black (hair)	Poza Rica, Veracruz	Live event	September 1, 1983	
Kendo Star (mask)	Mohicano II (mask)	San Lorenzo, Mexico State	Live event	February 9, 1992	
Juventud Guerrera (mask)	Salsero (mask)	Ciudad Juárez, Chihuahua	Live event	October 20, 1996	
Pierroth Jr. (hair)	Salsero (hair)	Nuevo Laredo, Tamaulipas	Live event	September 13, 1999	
Salsero (hair)	El Petrolero (mask)	Poza Rica, Veracruz	Live event	N/A	
Salsero (hair)	Bestia Negra I (hair)	Cuernavaca, Morelos	Live event	November 9, 2000	
El Hijo del Diablo (hair)	Salsero (hair)	Tulancingo, Hidalgo	Live event	September 16, 2001	
Salsero (hair)	Super Parka (hair)	Tijuana, Baja California	Live event	July 5, 2002	(Note: Super Parka put his hair on the line despite being masked.)
Rey Misterio (hair)	Salsero (hair)	Tijuana, Baja California	Live event	December 13, 2002	
El Texano (hair)	Salsero (hair)	Reynosa, Tamaulipas	Live event	June 10, 2003	(Note: 8-man steel cage match.)
Kato Kung Lee (hair)	Salsero (hair)	Tijuana, Baja California	Live event	August 6, 2004	
Pierko El Boricua (mask)	El Mimo (mask)	Neza, Mexico State	Live event	October 31, 2008	(Note: Relevos Suicidas: lost a match against Shocker and Halloween.)
Silver Star (mask)	Pierko el Boriqua (mask)	Monterrey, Nuevo Leon	Live event	December 13, 2009	(Note: Triangle match that also included Diluvio Negro I.)
