= Ari Romero =

Mexican professional wrestler (1951 – 2013)

Jose Luis Arias Romero
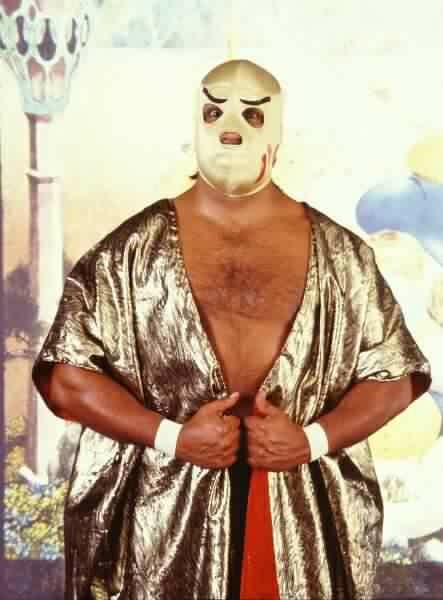
- Romero when he worked as "Gran Sheik"

Personal information
- Born: Jose Luis Arias Romero; December 20, 1951 Querétaro, Mexico
- Died: December 29, 2013 (aged 62)

Professional wrestling career
- Ring name(s): El Gato; Arias Romero; Ari Romero; Hussein El Gran Sheik/Gran Sheik; Shadow V Karma
- Billed height: 1.71 m (5 ft 7 in)
- Billed weight: 99 kg (218 lb; 15.6 st)
- Billed from: Iraq (As El Gran Sheik)
- Trained by: Lou Thesz
- Debut: October 1967 – Querétaro, Mexico
- Retired: 2012

Jose Luis Arias Romero (December 20, 1951 – December 29, 2013), was a Mexican professional wrestler who wrestled in Mexico, the United States and Japan, under the ring name Ari Romero. Romero earned the nickname "El Rey del Tenedor" ("The King of the Fork") by using a fork to make his adversaries bleed in his matches. He was also nicknamed "El Rey de las Cadenas" (Spanish for "King of the chains").

== Wrestling career ==
Romero began his career in his native city of Querétaro as an masked professional wrestler known as "El Gato" (Spanish for "the cat") at the age of 15. His father was the local Empresa Mundial de Lucha Libre (EMLL, now known as Consejo Mundial de Lucha Libre (CMLL)) promoter but when it came to his son's debut he put Romero in the opening bout and ordered the guys to be a little extra rough with him. After a few years of in-ring experience Romero, would get called up to EMLL full-time and would debut at Arena Coliseo in Mexico City. After working in Mexico City for several years, the EMLL offices send him to Ciudad Juárez with their local affiliate to further develop his wrestling skills. Ciudad Juarez would become Romero's home as he became a fixture in the area and would later play a big role in the beginning of Eddie Guerrero and Konnan's wrestling careers. An injury while in Juarez forced Ari to return to Mexico City and soon after he lost his "El Gato" mask in a match against Halcón Dorado as part of EMLL's "Martes Populares" show. After losing his "El Gato" mask Romero returned to Juarez but this time with a rival promoter of the area, Gory Guerrero, who ran his shows at Plaza de Torros Balderas only two blocks away from EMLL's Juarez location. While working for Gory Guerrero Romero began his long lasting storyline feud) with the Guerrero family. Romero began working under his real name, Jose Luis Arias Romero, later shortened to simply Arias Romero by Gory Guerrero. Guerrero decided to have Romero debut as a face (professional wrestling term for those that play the good guys), going against Romero's natural heel (bad guy, "rudo" In Mexico) tendencies. During his debut against a hated local, Romero managed to rile up the crowd so much that he turned the heel face in the crowds eye and had them booing Romero instead. Romero quickly moved into a storyline with the local top wrestler, Hector Guerrero, Gory's son. The highlight of the storyline with the Guerrero family was defeating all four Guerreros in an elimination 4 vs. 4 match. Romero singlehandedly eliminated Chavo, Mando and Gory and in a heated match finally also overcame Hector Guerrero. Not long after defeating the four Guerreros Ari Romero left to join the "la Division del Norte" wrestling circuit in Monterrey, led by lucha legend Rene Guajardo and composed of mostly ex EMLL guys.

It was here that the promoter shortened his name from Arias Romero to Ari Romero. After working in Monterrey Romero gained his first taste of international experience, working his first tour of the United States. He would first work in the southwestern part, working mainly on the Native American Reservations of New Mexico, Utah and Arizona. Later he would go to Southeast Championship Wrestling and work their territory in Tennessee, Alabama, Kentucky, Florida, Mississippi and Georgia. While working in the US Romero picked up a more American style of wrestling and would take what he learned back to Mexico. Romero claimed that it wasn't until he wrestled in the south that he finally understood the psychology of pro wrestling. After his tour of the US Romero would return to EMLL with a lot more experience. This time round he had his first big run with the company, taking part in one of EMLLs first Central American tours to El Salvador, Guatemala and Panama. From here Romero would get sent by the EMLL offices to Los Angeles where he would work for Promoter Mike Labell at the Olympic Auditorium for the National Wrestling Alliance. The NWA, EMLL and New Japan Pro-Wrestling (NJPW) had formed a working relationship and exchanged talents to help strengthen all three promotions. EMLL sent Mil Mascaras, Black Gordman, the Great Goliath and Ari Romero to work at the Olympic Auditorium. Romero enjoyed a good run in NWA, a run that saw him participate in his first tour of Japan, one of many to come, and also a tour of the Pacific Islands in Hawaii, New Zealand, Guam, Samoa, Fiji, Australia and Tonga for "High Chief" Peter Maivia. During his stint with them Romero won the Pacific Island Tag Team Championship alongside Peter Maivia. After this Romero would find himself back in EMLL working high on the card, scoring victories over top talents of the time such as La Fiera, Alfonso Dantés and others. Later on Romero left EMLL and ventured out to San Antonio, Texas to work for Tully Blanchard's Southwest Championship Wrestling. After working in Texas Romero returned to Juarez where he helped several up and comers like Eddie Guerrero, Konnan, Blue Demon, Jr., Tinieblas Jr., Heavy Metal both through training them and by working with them in matches. Romero continued wrestling full-time locally in Juarez while making annual appearances for EMLL and tours to Japan for many distinct promotions, among them All Japan Pro Wrestling (AJPW).

During the early 1990s Romero returned to CMLL once again, but this time as a new masked character, inspired by the ongoing Gulf War Romero became El Gran Sheik, with the storyline being that he was an actual Iraqi Sheikh. As El Grand Sheik he brought a slave with him to the ring as part of imagery. Romero's career saw a resurgence as "El Gran Sheik", he even took part in Michinoku Pro's World Masked Tournament representing Saudi Arabia (even though his gimmick was supposed to be Iraqi). Romero ended up losing the Gran Shiek mask to Blue Demon, Jr. on February 9, 1995. His popularity during his tours of the Orient made him decide to relocate to Japan after losing the El Gran Sheik mask. Romero spent the next eight years wrestling all over Asia doing shows in Japan, Korea, Hong Kong, Philippines, Malaysia and even Russia. In late 2003 Ari returned to Juarez to help his son, billed as "Ari Romero Jr.", break into the wrestling business, working for the same local promotion that Romero, Sr. worked for years earlier.

=== Outside the ring ===
Outside the ring Romero worked with his favorite hobby, music. He formed a music group composed professional wrestlers. The group ended up performing at Mexico's prestigious "Teatro Blanquita" as headliners. The Group was composed of Ari Romero (lead guitar and vocals), Kung Fu (drums), El Pantera (guitar), El Apache (Bass), Buffalo Salvaje (vocals), Mario Prado (percussion) and Estrellita (keyboard and vocals). Romero recorded four CD's, three of which were his own material.

=== Death ===
In December 2013, Romero died after a battle with liver cancer at the age of 62.

== Championships and accomplishments ==
- World Wrestling Association
  - WWA World Junior Light Heavyweight Championship (1 time)
- Other titles
  - Northern Tag Team Championship (2 times) – with Flama Roja and Crazy 33 (2)
  - Pacific Islands Tag Team Championship (1 time) – with "High Chief" Peter Maivia
  - Querétaro Welterweight Championship

== Luchas de Apuestas record ==
Winner (wager)	Loser (wager)	Location	Event	Date	Notes
Halcon Dorado (mask)	El Gato (mask)	Mexico City	Live event	1975	
Águila Solitaria (mask) and Franco Colombo (hair)	Cid Campeador (mask) and Ari Romero (hair)	Mexico City	Live event	June 19, 1982	
Ari Romero (mask)	Doberman (mask)	Mexico City	Live event	August 18, 1984	
Ari Romero and Franco Colombo (hair)	Los Destructores (hair) (Vulcano and Tony Arce)	Mexico City	Live event	August 26, 1984	
Eddy Guerrero (hair)	Ari Romero (hair)	El Paso, Texas	Live event	1987	
Blue Demon, Jr. (mask)	El Gran Sheik (mask)	Mexico City, Mexico	Live event	November, 1994	
Silver King (hair)	Ari Romero (hair)	Mexico City	Live event	February 9, 1995	
Mega (mask)	Karma (mask)	Naucalpan, State of Mexico	Castillo de la Muerte	October 31, 2002	(Note: Last two men in a 10-man steel cage match.)
