= Oficial Factor =

Mexican professional wrestler (born 1977)

Personal information
- Born: Cesar Caballero; November 25, 1977 (age 48)

Professional wrestling career
- Ring name(s): Mega; Oficial Factor; Rockambole Jr.
- Billed height: 1.80 m (5 ft 11 in)
- Billed weight: 102 kg (225 lb)
- Trained by: Rams
- Debut: 1998 (Note: His debut date has been stated as both January 4, 1998 and November 30, 1998 with no confirmation of which is the correct date.)

Cesar Caballero (born November 25, 1977) is a Mexican professional wrestler. Working under the ring name Oficial Factor, he appears for the Mexican professional wrestling promotion International Wrestling Revolution Group (IWRG). Caballero previously worked under a number of other ring names including Mega, but they are not officially acknowledged, as the masked wrestler character is promoted as a separate entity from his previous characters, which is often the case when a Mexican wrestler adopts a new masked character. He is from a wrestling family, though it is not known to which other wrestlers he is related.

== Professional wrestling career ==
In Mexico, it is traditional to keep the true identify of a masked wrestler a secret, not revealing their real names and oftentimes not revealing what previous ring names they have competed under. Caballero worked as "Mega" from 2000 taking the role from Último Gladiador.

=== Los Megas (2001–2007) ===
In 2001 International Wrestling Revolution Group (IWRG) formed a new "trio" known as Los Megas, taking three of their regular competitors, putting them together with a character based on the Mega character. Último Vampiro was turned into Super Mega and a wrestler known as El Milionario became known as Ultra Mega. Los Megas portrayed a kid-friendly técnico (good guys) silver-and-black-clad group. Los Megas defeated Los Oficiales (Guardia, Oficial and Vigilante) on August 2, 2001, to win the Distrito Federal Trios Championship, starting off a 161-day-long title reign. The trio was defeated for the title by Dr. Cerebro, Cirujano, and Paramedico on January 10, 2002. Only a month later Mega and Ultra Mega defeated Fantasy and Star Boy to win the IWRG Intercontinental Tag Team Championship. They team held the title for 73 days until losing to MAZADA and NOZAWA. Super Mega was later replaced with Omega to keep Los Megas a trio. Mega, Ultra Mega, and Omega teamed up to win the Distrito Federal Trios Championship at some point in 2002 and held the title until December 12, 2003, where they were defeated by Dr. Markus Jr., Dr. Muerte, and Enfermero Jr.. 2003 also saw Mega, Ultra Mega, and Omega win the IWRG Intercontinental Trios Championship from Nosawa, Takemura and Masada on June 5, 2003. Mega and Ultra Mega also held the IWRG Tag Team Championship for almost a year between 2003 and 2004, winning the titles from Fantasy and Star Boy and losing them to Dr. Cerebro and Bombero Infernal. In 2003 IWRG introduced a group designed to be the "archenemy" of Los Megas in the form of Los Comandos (Comando Mega, Comando Gama, and Comando Omega), who were dark and destructive to counter Los Megas' bright, kid-friendly personas. The group feuded for the better part of a year. The storyline between the two factions saw Mega and Ultra Mega defeat Comando Mega and Comando Gama in a Lucha de Apuesta, mask vs. mask match on June 6, 2004. Following the end of the feud with the Comandos, Los Megas began to fade away. At the 2004 Castillo del Terror steel cage match Mega lost to Black Dragon and was forced to unmask and reveal his birth name. It has not been documented what Caballero did between 2004 and 2012, he may have wrestled under a different mask maybe even retired for a period of time.

=== Oficial Factor (2012–present) ===
In late 2011 Oficial Spartan and Oficial Rayan formed Los Oficiales Elite, a group created to rival Los Oficiales (Oficial 911, Oficial AK-47, and Oficial Fierro). In early 2012 Los Oficiales Elite became a trio with the introduction of Oficial Factor to the team. Factor was the returning Caballero under a new mask and ring character. On March 18, 2012, Los Oficiales Elite defeated Los Gringos VIP (Apolo Estrada, Jr., Avisman and El Hijo del Diablo) to win the Distrito Federal Trios Championship, a title that is only sanctioned in Mexico City. The Oficiales vs Oficiales Elite feud led to all six competitors putting their masks on the line in a steel cage match as the main event of the 2012 Guerra del Golfo show. During the show Oficial Factor and 911 both lost a steel cage match, which meant that the two were supposed to face off in the final match; as a show of unity, their respective partners all joined them in the steel cage, making it a six-way match instead. The match came down to Oficial Factor and Oficial AK-47 with Factor gaining the important victory, forcing AK-47 to have his hair shaved off as a result. The feud between the two factions continued throughout 2012 with several highlights, including Oficial Factor winning the 2012 Rey del Ring tournament, defeating 29 other wrestlers including members of Los Oficiales. On July 26, 2012, Los Oficiales ended Oficiales Elite's reign as Distrito Federal Trios Championship after 129 days. In late 2012 the individual members of Los Oficiales Elite began focusing on individual storylines instead of the overall "Oficiales vs. Oficiales" storyline. Factor became involved in a storyline with El Hijo de Pirata Morgan, which saw Factor win the IWRG Junior de Juniors Championship from Hijo de Pirata, as well as lose and regain the Rey del Ring Championship. In November 2012 it was announced that Oficial Factor, Hijo de Pirata Morgan, Oficial 911, and Hijo de Máscara Año 2000 had all agreed to risk their masks in a Prison Fatal steel cage match on December 2, 2012. The last person in the steel cage would be forced to unmask. The Prison Fatal match came down to Factor and Oficial 911 after the other two competitors escaped the cage. At one point all Oficiales and Oficiales Elite were actually in the cage, but in the end 911 managed to escape, forcing Factor to unmask. After unmasking he gave his name as Cesar Caballero, the same name he gave when he lost the "Mega" mask in 2004. On January 1, 2013, Factor defeated El Hijo de Pirata Morgan to regain the IWRG Junior de Juniors Championship. On May 16 Carta Brava, Jr. defeated Factor to win the Junior de Juniors Championship.

== Championships and accomplishments ==
- International Wrestling Revolution Group
  - IWRG Intercontinental Tag Team Championship (3 times) – Mega and Ultra Mega
  - IWRG Intercontinental Trios Championship (1 time) – with Ultra Mega and Omega
  - IWRG Junior de Juniors Championship (2 times) (Note: IWRG never revealed exactly how Oficial Factor was considered a second-generation wrestler.)
  - IWRG Rey del Ring Championship (1 time)
  - Distrito Federal Trios Championship (3 times) – with Super Mega and Ultra Mega (1), with Ultra Mega and Omega (1), with Oficial Spartan and Oficial Rayan (Note: The title is only sanctioned for Mexico City shows but is officially recognized by IWRG.)

== Luchas de Apuestas record ==
Winner (wager)	Loser (wager)	Location	Event	Date	Notes
Mega (mask)	Karma (mask)	Naucalpan, Mexico State	Castillo del Terror	October 31, 2002	
Mega (mask)	Oficial (hair)	Naucalpan, Mexico State	IWRG show	March 2, 2003	
Mega (mask)	Comando Alfa (mask)	Naucalpan, Mexico State	IWRG show	November 2, 2003	
Los Megas (masks) (Mega and Ultra Mega)	Los Gamas (masks) (Comando Gama and Comando Mega)	Naucalpan, Mexico State	IWRG show	June 6, 2004	
Mega (mask)	Steel Man I (mask)	Naucalpan, Mexico State	Prison Fatal	July 22, 2004	(Note: Last two men in a Prison Fatal steel cage match.)
Black Dragon (mask)	Mega (mask)	Naucalpan, Mexico State	Castillo del Terror	October 22, 2004	
Oficial Factor (mask)	Oficial AK-47 (hair)	Naucalpan, Mexico State	Guerra del Golfo	March 15, 2012	(Note: Steel cage match originally contested between Oficial 911 and Oficial Factor. Oficial AK-47, Oficial Fierro, Oficial Rayan and Oficial Spartans all entered the cage to interfere in the match.)
Oficial 911 (mask)	Oficial Factor (mask)	Naucalpan, Mexico State	Prison Fatal	December 2, 2012	(Note: Steel cage match, which originally also included Hijo de Pirata Morgan and Hijo de Máscara Año 2000. Oficial AK-47, Oficial Fierro, Oficial Rayan and Oficial Spartans all entered the cage to interfere in the match.)
