= Oficial Spartan =

Mexican professional wrestler

Personal information
- Born: Victor Manuel Montés; July 28, 1975 (age 50) Guerrero, Mexico

Professional wrestling career
- Ring name(s): Arlequín Rojo; Cepillito; Guerrero Atomico; Halcon de Fuego; Oficial Spartan; Oficial Spartans; Omega
- Billed height: 1.80 m (5 ft 11 in)
- Billed weight: 98 kg (216 lb)
- Trained by: Chamaco Hernandez; Fuego Negro; Scorpio
- Debut: 1990

Oficial Spartan is the current ring name of Victor Manuel Montés (born July 29, 1975 in Guerrero, Mexico), who is a Mexican professional wrestler. He currently working for the Mexican professional wrestling promotion International Wrestling Revolution Group (IWRG). Montés previously worked under a number of other ring names including Omega and Arlequín Rojo, but they are not publicly acknowledged as the masked character is promoted as a separate entity from Montés' previous characters as is often the case when a Mexican wrestler adopts a new masked character.

== Professional wrestling career ==
Victor Manuel Montés began his professional wrestling career in 1990 and worked under various enmascarado (masked) characters such as Halcon de Fuego ("Fire Falcon"), Guerrero Atomico ("Atomic Warrior") and Cepillito ("Brush").

=== Omega (2002–2004) ===
In 2002 Super Mega left IWRG to work for Consejo Mundial de Lucha Libre (CMLL), leaving Los Megas (Mega and Ultra Mega) without a third man. Victor Montés was repackaged, given a new mask and suit that matched the other Megas and made his debut as "Omega". Not long after the replacement Los Megas won the IWRG Intercontinental Trios Championship from NOZAWA, Takemura and Masada. In 2003 IWRG introduced a group designed to be the "archenemy" of Los Megas in the form of Los Comandos (Comando Mega, Comando Gama and Comando Omega), who were dark and destructive to counter Los Megas' bright, kid-friendly personas. The groups developed their rivalry for the better part of a year, escalating the tension between the two groups. Los Comandos scored a major victory in the feud when Comando Gama defeated Omega in a Lucha de Apuesta, or "Bet match" where the loser was forced to unmask. Omega removed his mask and subsequently was only used sporadically. The storyline between the two factions saw Mega and Ultra Mega gain revenge and "win" the feud by defeating Comando Mega and Comando Gama in a Lucha de Apuesta, mask vs. mask match on June 6, 2004, a match that was considered the end of the Megas Vs Comandos storyline. Following the culmination of the feud Los Megas began to fade away, being used less and less by IWRG, with long stretches of the ring characters being inactive. With two of the three members unmasked the concept lost its appeal and was quietly abandoned by the end of 2004. IWRG did not even bring Los Megas back to lose the IWRG Intercontinental Trios Championship that they held, instead opting to vacate the championship and hold a tournament to determine the new champions.

=== Arlequín Rojo (2009–2010) ===
It has not been confirmed what Montés did between ending his stint as Omega and returning to IWRG in 2009, he could have been working as another masked character or even not worked in wrestling in that period of time. Montés returned to IWRG as the masked character "Arlequín Rojo" ("Red Harlequin) as part of Los Arlequíns, a group of rudo clown characters that included Arlequín Amarillo ("Yellow Harlequin"), Arlequín Verde ("Green Harlequin") and Arlequín Negro ("Black Harlequin"). Montés' time as an Arlequín was most notable for his mask loss, being defeated by Rigo to lose the elaborate Arlequín match in a Luchas de Apuestas match. A few weeks later, he also lost his hair when he and Arlequín Amarillo lost a tag team Luchas de Apuestas match to Rigo and Chico Che. He occasionally worked as Arlequín Rojo until the end of 2010 where the character disappeared from IWRG.

=== Oficial Spartan (2011–present) ===
In the mid-2011 the group Los Oficiales introduced a new member called Oficial Spartans, later shortened to just Oficial Spartan, who was played by Montés and was brought in to replace the injured Oficial AK-47. After a while Spartan and the original Oficiales had a falling out after Spartan cost their team a number of matches due to disqualifications and they kicked him out of the group. Spartan would return with back up in the form of Oficial Rayan, forming a group called Los Oficiales Elite to start a rival faction to Los Oficiales. Spartan and rival Oficial 911 were both part of the 2011 Castillo del Terror ("Castle of Terror") match, a steel cage match where all the contestants put their mask on the line. The rivals both escaped the cage with their masks intact. In early 2012 Los Oficiales Elite became a trio with the introduction of Oficial Factor to the team. On March 18, 2012, Los Oficiales Elite defeated Los Gringos VIP (Apolo Estrada, Jr., Avisman, and Hijo del Diablo) to win the Distrito Federal Trios Championship, a title that is only sanctioned in Mexico City. The feud between the two factions continued throughout 2012 with several highlights, including Oficial AK-47 winning the vacant IWRG Intercontinental Middleweight Championship in a tournament, which saw him defeat Oficial Spartan in the quarter final. On July 26, 2012, Los Oficiales ended Oficiales Elite's reign as Distrito Federal Trios Championship after 129 days. In late November 2012, it was announced that Oficial Factor, El Hijo de Pirata Morgan, Oficial 911, and El Hijo de Máscara Año 2000 had all agreed to risk their masks in a Prison Fatal steel cage match on December 2, 2012. The Prison Fatal match came down to Factor and Oficial 911 after the other two competitors escaped the cage. At one point all six Oficiales and Oficiales Elite were actually in the cage, but in the end 911 managed to escape, forcing Factor to unmask.

== Championships and accomplishments ==
- International Wrestling Revolution Group
  - IWRG Intercontinental Trios Championship (1 time) – with Mega and Ultra Mega
  - Distrito Federal Trios Championship (2 times) – with Mega and Ultra Mega (1), with Oficial Factor and Oficial Rayan (Note: The title is only sanctioned for Mexico City shows but is officially recognized by IWRG.)

== Luchas de Apuestas record ==
Winner (wager)	Loser (wager)	Location	Event	Date	Notes
Comando Gama (mask)	Omega (mask)	Naucalpan, Mexico State	IWRG show	February 22, 2004	(Note: Last two wrestlers in a Torneo cibernetico suicida and were forced to face off.)
Rigo (mask)	Arlequín Rojo (mask)	Naucalpan, Mexico State	Guerra del Golfo	September 16, 2009	
Rigo and Chico Che (hair)	Arlequín Amarillo and Arlequín Rojo (hair)	Naucalpan, Mexico State	IWRG showt	September 16, 2009	
Black Dragón (mask)	Oficial Spartan (mask)	Naucalpan, Mexico State	El Castillo del Terror	November 2, 2017	(Note: Steel cage match that also included La Mosca, Trauma I, Capo del Norte, Tortuga Leo, Aramís, Diablo Jr., Violencia Jr. and Warrior Jr.)
Black Dragón (hair)	Oficial Spartan (hair)	Naucalpan, Mexico State	Cabellera vs. Cabellera	February 11, 2018	
