= Day of the Death =

Studio album by Death by Stereo
- Released: January 23, 2001
- Recorded: Mid-2000
- Genre: Hardcore punk
- Length: 38:26
- Label: Epitaph
- Producer: Death by Stereo

Death by Stereo chronology
If Looks Could Kill I'd Watch You Die (1999)	Day of the Death (2001)	Into the Valley of Death (2003)

Professional ratings
Review scores
Source	Rating
Kerrang!	4/5 stars

Day of the Death is the second album by American hardcore punk band Death by Stereo, released in 2001.

The band became more widely known after this release due to their switch from the Indecision Records label to the larger Epitaph Records label. This is the group's first album on Epitaph Records.

== Track listing ==
No.	Title	Length
1.	"No Shirt, No Shoes, No Salvation"	2:41
2.	"Getting It Off My Chest"	2:37
3.	"91"	2:50
4.	"You Can Lead a Man to Reason, But You Can't Make Him Think"	3:30
5.	"Porno, Sex, Drugs, Lies, Money and Your Local Government"	3:30
6.	"Holding 60 Dollars on a Burning Bridge"	2:46
7.	"You Mess with One Bean, You Mess with the Whole Burrito"	3:01
8.	"Desperation Train"	3:01
9.	"Testosterone Makes the World Go Round"	3:03
10.	"High School Was Like Boot Camp for a Desk Job"	3:01
11.	"Death for Life"	8:26

"Death for Life" is actually only 3:00 long, but includes five minutes of silence (3:00–8:00) and a hidden track begins: there is a section right near the end which is the sound of a gong and a manic scream.

== Band line-up ==
- Efrem Schulz - vocals
- Jim Miner - rhythm guitar, backing vocals
- Dan Palmer - lead guitar, backing vocals
- Paul Miner - bass, backing vocals
- Tim Bender - drums, backing vocals

=== Adtional credits ===
- Recorded at For the Record and Death Tracks
- Engineered by Paul Miner
- Assistant engineered by Sergio Chavez
- Mastered by Eddy Schreyer at Oasis Mastering
