= IWRG Guerra de Sexos =

International Wrestling Revolution Group event series

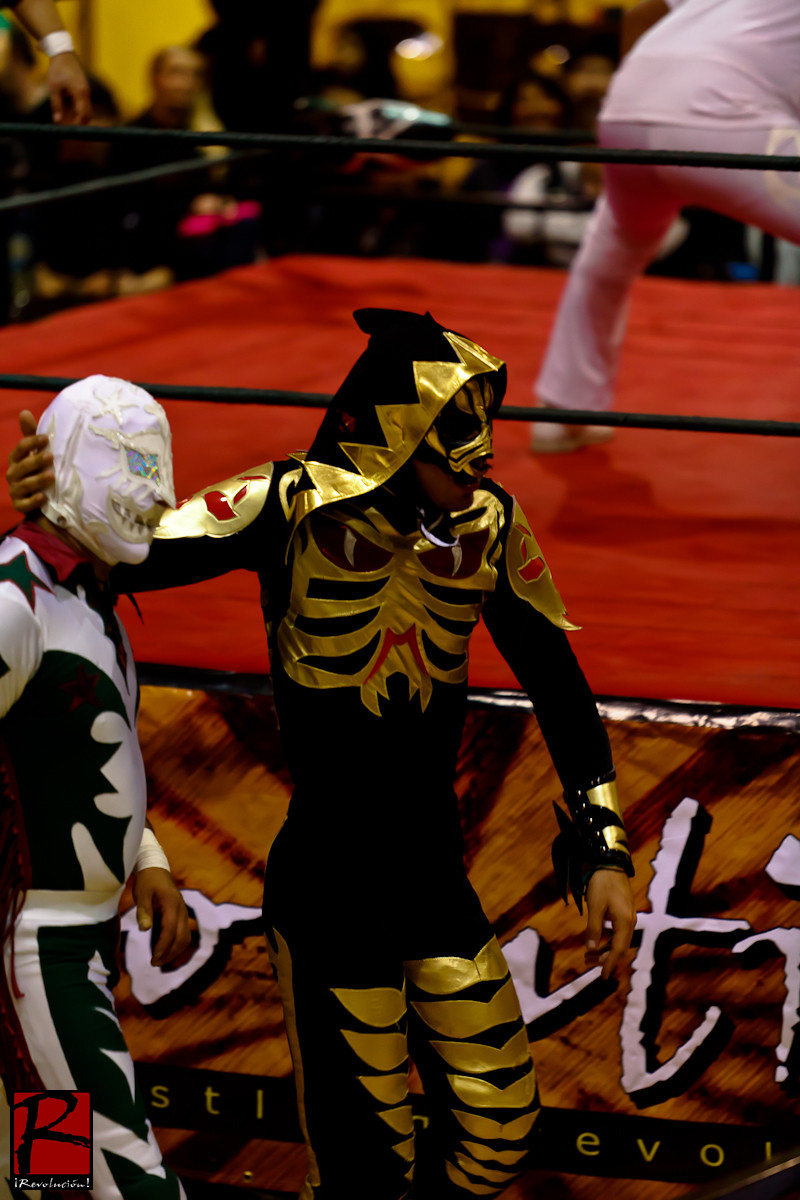
El Hijo de L.A. Park (in black and gold), participated in 2011.

Guerra de Sexos is a professional wrestling event produced annually by Lucha Libre promotion International Wrestling Revolution Group (IWRG). The event was established in 2011 and is held in February. The concept of the show was that each main event match was to be contested as a Mixed Steel Cage Match, with male, female, Mini-Estrella and Exótico competitors in the match at the same time. The last person in the cage would be forced to either remove their wrestling mask, or if already unmask have their hair shaved off under the Lucha de Apuestas, or bet match, rules. Being professional wrestling events, matches are not won legitimately through athletic competition; they are instead won via predetermined outcomes to the matches that is kept secret from the general public. Wrestlers portray either heels (the bad guys, referred to as Rudos in Mexico) or faces (fan favorites or Técnicos in Mexico). IWRG has not held a Guerra de Sexos event since 2012.

== Dates, venues and main events ==
Event	Date	Venue	City	Main event	Reference
2011	September 16, 2011	Arena Naucalpan	Naucalpan, State of Mexico	10 person Mask vs. Hair Steel Cage Match	
2012	February 5, 2012	Arena Naucalpan	Naucalpan, State of Mexico	12 person Mask vs. Hair Steel Cage Match	
