= El Protector (2016) =

2016 International Wrestling Revolution Group event

- Official poster for the show depicting all the competitors in the El Protector tournament.
- Promotion: International Wrestling Revolution Group
- Date: January 31, 2016
- City: Naucalpan, State of Mexico
- Venue: Arena Naucalpan

Event chronology
← Previous; Arena Naucalpan 38th Anniversary Show	Next → Rebelión de los Juniors

El Protector chronology
← Previous; 2015	Next → 2017

El Protector (2016) was an annual professional wrestling major event produced by Mexican professional wrestling promotion International Wrestling Revolution Group (IWRG), which took place on January 31, 2016 in Arena Naucalpan, Naucalpan, State of Mexico, Mexico. The 2016 El Protector was the fifth annual event produced under that name and the third to be held in January. The focal point of the show was the El Protector tag team tournament where eight teams composed of a "rookie" and a "vet" team up to compete for a trophy. The 2016 El Protector was won by Herodes Jr. and Atomic Star.

== Production ==
=== Background ===
Lucha Libre has a tradition for a tournament where a rookie, or novato, would be teamed up with an experienced veteran wrestler for a tag team tournament in the hopes of giving the Novato a chance to show case their talent and move up the ranks. Consejo Mundial de Lucha Libre has held a Torneo Gran Alternativa ("Great Alternative Tournament") almost every year since 1994, but the concept predates the creation of the Gran Alternativa. The Mexican professional wrestling company International Wrestling Revolution Group (IWRG; at times referred to as Grupo Internacional Revolución in Mexico) started their own annual rookie/veteran tournament in 2010. The first two tournaments were called Torneo Relampago de Proyeccion a Nuevas Promesas de la Lucha Libre (Spanish for "Projecting a new promise lightning tournament") but would be renamed the El Protector tournament in 2012. The El Protector shows, as well as the majority of the IWRG shows in general, are held in "Arena Naucalpan", owned by the promoters of IWRG and their main arena. The 2016 El Protector show was the seventh time that IWRG promoted a show around the rookie/veteran tournament, with the name changing to El Protector in 2012 and onwards.

=== Storylines ===
The event featured 11 professional wrestling matches with different wrestlers involved in pre-existing scripted feuds, plots and storylines. Wrestlers were portrayed as either heels (referred to as rudos in Mexico, those that portray the "bad guys") or faces (técnicos in Mexico, the "good guy" characters) as they followed a series of tension-building events, which culminated in a wrestling match or series of matches.

== El Protector participants ==
- Adrenalina (rookie) and X-Fly (veteran)
- Atomic Star (rookie) and Herodes Jr. (veteran)
- Danny Casas (rookie) and Emperador Azteca (veteran)
- Dragón Fly (rookie) and El Hijo de Dos Caras (veteran)
- Hijo de Máscara Sagrada (rookie) and Máscara Sagrada (veteran)
- Hijo del Alebrije (rookie) and Veneno (veteran)
- Hip Hop Man (rookie) and Trauma I (veteran)
- Kanon (rookie) and Toscano (veteran)

== Event ==
The 2016 El Protector was the third year in a row that Atomic Star had appeared as a rookie, having previously teamed up with Eterno in both the 2014 tournament and the 2015 tournament. For the 2016 tournament Atomic Star teamed up with Herodes, Jr. who had only recently begun working for IWRG. With his victory Atomic Star became the first rookie to win the tournament it his third attempt and the only wrestler to compete as a rookie in three tournaments.

On the under card the trio of El Hijo del Diablo. his son El Diablo Jr. I and Imposible were revealed as Los Mariachis Locos as they challenged for the Distrito Federal Trios Championship. Los Mariachis won the second and the third fall, defeating Los Terrible Cerebros (Black Terry, Cerebro Negro and Dr. Cerebro to win the championship. With the victory Los Mariachis ended the reign of Los Terrible Cerebros at 235 days.

=== Results ===
No.	Results	Stipulations
1	Alas de Acero, Aramis and Rey Paloma defeated Guerrero 2000, Power Bull and Vórtize	Six-man "Lucha Libre rules" tag team match
2	Los Mariachis Locos (El Hijo del Diablo, El Diablo Jr. I and Imposible) defeated Los Terrible Cerebros (Black Terry, Cerebro Negro and Dr. Cerebro) (c)	Six-man "Lucha Libre rules" tag team match for the Distrito Federal Trios Championship
3	Negro Navarro and Trauma II defeated El Hijo del Pantera and Pantera II	Tag team match
4	Emperador Azteca and Hip Hop Man defeated Adrenalina, Atomic Star, Dragón Fly, Hijo de Máscara Sagrada, Hijo del Alebrije and Kanon	El Protector, seeding battle royal
5	Adrenalina and X-Fly defeated Kanon and Toscano	El Protector, quarter final match
6	Atomic Star and Herodes Jr. defeated Hijo de Máscara Sagrada and Máscara Sagrada by disqualification	El Protector, quarter final match
7	Dragón Fly and El Hijo de Dos Caras defeated Hijo del Alebrije and Veneno	El Protector, quarter final match
8	Hip Hop Man and Trauma I defeated Danny Casas and Emperador Azteca	El Protector, quarter final match
9	Atomic Star and Herodes Jr. defeated Adrenalina and X-Fly	El Protector, semi-final match
10	Dragón Fly and El Hijo de Dos Caras defeated Hip Hop Man and Trauma I	El Protector, semi-final match
11	Atomic Star and Herodes Jr. defeated Dragón Fly and El Hijo de Dos Caras	El Protector, semi-final matchEl Protector, final match
(c) / – the champion(s) heading into the match
