= IWRG Máscara vs. Cabellera (February 2017) =

2017 International Wrestling Revolution Group event

- Official poster for the event
- Date: February 12, 2017
- City: Naucalpan, State of Mexico
- Venue: Arena Naucalpan

Event chronology
← Previous; Prisión Fatal	Next → El Protector

IWRG Lucha de Apuestas chronology
← Previous; September 2016	Next → 3 vs. 3

The IWRG Máscara vs. Cabellera (February 2017) (Spanish for "Mask vs. Hair") show was a major lucha libre event produced and scripted by Mexican professional wrestling promotion International Wrestling Revolution Group (IWRG), that took place on February 12, 2017in Arena Naucalpan, Naucalpan, State of Mexico, Mexico. The focal point of the Máscara vs. Caballera series of shows is one or more traditional Lucha de Apuestas, or "Bet matches", where all competitors in the match risk their hair on the outcome of the match. The Lucha de Apuestas is considered the most prestigious match type in lucha libre, especially when a wrestlers mask is on the line, but the "hair vs. hair" stipulation is held in almost as high regard.

In the main event of the show Golden Magic successfully defended his wrestling mask against Pirata Morgan Jr. in a Lucha de Apuestas, or "Bet match". As a result, the maskless Pirata Morgan Jr. had all his hair shaved off. Earlier in the show Negro Navarro joined Los Consagrados, even attacking his own son Trauma I in the progress. The show included five additional matches.

== Background ==
In Lucha libre the wrestling mask holds a sacred place, with the most anticipated and prestigious matches being those where a wrestler's mask is on the line, a so-called Lucha de Apuestas, or "bet match" where the loser would be forced to unmask in the middle of the ring and state their birth name. Winning a mask is considered a bigger accomplishment in lucha libre than winning a professional wrestling championship and usually draws more people and press coverage. Losing a mask is often a watershed moment in a wrestler's career, they give up the mystique and prestige of being an enmascarado (masked wrestler) but usually come with a higher than usual payment from the promoter. By the same token a wrestler betting his hair in a Lucha de Apuestas is seen as highly prestigious, usually a step below the mask match.

== Event ==
The event featured seven professional wrestling matches with different wrestlers involved in pre-existing scripted feuds, plots and storylines. Wrestlers were portrayed as either heels (referred to as rudos in Mexico, those that portray the "bad guys") or faces (técnicos in Mexico, the "good guy" characters) as they followed a series of tension-building events, which culminated in a wrestling match or series of matches.

In the fifth match of the night, former tag team partners Danny Casas and Veneno, faced off in a Singles match, that was won by Casas. After the match, both sides made challenges for a future Lucha de Apuestas, hair vs. hair match, although no date was set for this match. For the sixth match of the night Herodes Jr. was injured during the match, leaving his partners Máscara Año 2000 Jr. and Mr. Electro at a disadvantage against Negro Navarro, Pirata Morgan and Villano IV, collectively known as "Los Consagrados" ("The Devoted Ones"). Near the end of the match Black Terry came to ringside, looking like he was going to take Herodes Jr.'s place in the match, but instead fought Mr. Electro and joined "Los Consagrados" by helping them win the match. After the match was over Navarro's son Trauma I tried to stop the attack, but was attacked by his father and "Los Consagrados" ended up stealing his mask.

Pirata Morgan Jr. has his father, Pirata Morgan, in his corner for the main event. The recently unmasked Pirata Morgan Jr. put his hair on the line against Golden Magic, who was putting his mask on the line in the Lucha de Apuestas match. During the match Pirata Morgan interfered on several occasions, helping his son gain an unfair advantage. In the end, Golden Magic, despite being covered in his own blood and having his mask torn to shreds, managed to pin Pirata Morgan Jr. after Pirata Morgan mistakenly hit his son with a steel chair instead of Golden Magic. As a result of his loss Pirata Morgan Jr. had to submit to the humiliation of having all his hair shaved off as per the Lucha de Apuestas stipulation.

== Results ==
No.	Results	Stipulations
1	Aramís defeated Alfa	Singles match
2	Acero and Araña de Plata defeated Kanon and Mr. Magia	Tag team match
3	Súper Mega defeated Eterno	Single match
4	Cerebro Negro, Dr. Cerebro, and Relámpago defeated Imposible, Odin, and Pantera I	Six-man tag team match
5	Danny Casas defeated Veneno	Singles match
6	Negro Navarro, Pirata Morgan, and Villano IV defeated Herodes Jr., Máscara Año 2000 Jr., and Mr. Electro	Six-man tag team match
7	Golden Magic defeated Pirata Morgan Jr.	Lucha de Apuestas, mask vs. hair match
