= IWRG El Protector =

International Wrestling Revolution Group event series

El Protector is an annual lucha libre tournament held by the Mexican professional wrestling promotion International Wrestling Revolution Group (IWRG) in January of each year. The El Protector tournament started in 2012 but was preceded in 2010 and 2011 by the Torneo Relampago de Proyeccion a Nuevas Promesas de la Lucha Libre ("Projecting a new promise lightning tournament"), a tournament with the same format and concept. The concept of the tournament is to team a young up-and-comer with a veteran and use the tournament to help showcase the younger talent, the young winner is often someone IWRG has plans for, although at times it has not always had the desired result. The tournament has always been held in Arena Naucalpan in Naucalpan, State of Mexico, the main arena of IWRG. A total of 66 different wrestlers have competed in the seven tournaments held so far with Veneno being the only wrestler to compete in all seven. Alan Extreme, Eterno and Trauma I are the only three wrestlers to compete both as a rookie and as a veteran in the tournament. X-Fly is the only wrestler to win the tournament twice, winning the 2012 tournament and the 2013 tournament as a veteran.

== List of El Protector winners ==
Year	Winners		Date	Note
Year	Rookie	Veteran	Date	Note
2010	El Hijo del Signo	Dr. Cerebro	January 1, 2010	
2011	Comando Negro	Scorpio, Jr.	January 13, 2011	
2012	Imposible	X-Fly	January 12, 2012	
2013	Carta Brava, Jr.	X-Fly (2)	January 17, 2013	
2014	Electro Boy	Super Nova	February 2, 2014	
2015	Metaleon	Negro Navarro	February 15, 2015	
2016	Atomic Star	Herodes Jr.	January 31, 2016	
2017	Diablo Jr.	Negro Navarro	February 19, 2017	
2018	Villano V Jr.	Rokambole Jr.	February 25, 2018	

== Dates, venues and main events ==
Event	Date	Venue	City	Main event
2010	January 1, 2010	Arena Naucalpan	Naucalpan, State of Mexico	El Hijo del Signo and Dr. Cerebro vs. Comando Negro and Oficial 911 – 2010 Proyeccion a Nuevas Promesas tournament final
2011	January 13, 2011	Arena Naucalpan	Naucalpan, State of Mexico	Comando Negro and Scorpio, Jr. vs. Multifacetico IV and Trauma I – 2011 Proyeccion a Nuevas Promesas tournament final
2012	January 12, 2012	Arena Naucalpan	Naucalpan, State of Mexico	Imposible and X-Fly vs. Centvrión and Negro Navarro – 2012 El Protector tournament final
2013	January 17, 2013	Arena Naucalpan	Naucalpan, State of Mexico	Carta Brava, Jr. and X-Fly vs. Eita and Negro Navarro – 2013 El Protector tournament final
2014	February 2, 2014	Arena Naucalpan	Naucalpan, State of Mexico	Electro Boy and Súper Nova vs. Atomic Star and Eterno – 2014 El Protector tournament final
2015	February 15, 2015	Arena Naucalpan	Naucalpan, State of Mexico	Chicano and Danny Casas defended the IWRG Intercontinental Tag Team Championship against Los Primos Dinamita (Hijo de Máscara Año 2000 and Universo 2000 Jr.)
2016	January 31, 2016	Arena Naucalpan	Naucalpan, State of Mexico	Atomic Star and Herodes Jr. vs. Dragón Fly and El Hijo de Dos Caras - 2016 El Protector tournament final
2017	February 19, 2017	Arena Naucalpan	Naucalpan, State of Mexico	Imposible and Black Terry vs. Demonio Infernal and Negro Navarro - 2017 El Protector tournament final
2018	February 25, 2018	Arena Naucalpan	Naucalpan, State of Mexico	Villano V Jr. and Rokambole Jr. vs. Ram El Carnero and Trauma I - 2018 El Protector tournament final
