= El Protector (2018) =

2018 International Wrestling Revolution Group event

- Official poster showing all scheduled tournament participants
- Date: February 25, 2018
- City: Naucalpan, State of Mexico
- Venue: Arena Naucalpan

Event chronology
| ← Previous; Cabellera vs. Cabellera | Next → Rebelión de los Juniors |

IWRG El Protector chronology
| ← Previous; 2017 | Next → 2019 |

El Protector (2018) was a major lucha libre event produced and scripted by Mexican professional wrestling promotion International Wrestling Revolution Group (IWRG), which took place on January 31, 2016 in Arena Naucalpan, Naucalpan, State of Mexico, Mexico. The 2017 El Protector was the seventh annual event produced under that name. The focal point of the show was the El Protector tag team tournament where eight teams composed of a "rookie" and a "vet" team up to compete for as a way to showcase the "rookie" of the team.

The 2018 El Protector tournament saw 8 teams of rookies and veterans wrestle in a single elimination tournament. Villano V Jr. was originally scheduled to team with Shadow Boy, but IWRG booked the tournament so that Rokambole Jr. was allowed to replace Shadow Boy to team with his brother. The brothers won the tournament, defeating Ram El Carnero and Trauma I in the finals, marking the first time that a "rookie"/"veteran" team did not win the tournament. There were five non-tournament matches on the show as well.

== Production ==
=== Background ===
Lucha Libre has a tradition for a tournament where a rookie, or novato, would be teamed up with an experienced veteran wrestler for a tag team tournament in the hopes of giving the Novato a chance to show case their talent and move up the ranks. Consejo Mundial de Lucha Libre has held a Torneo Gran Alternativa ("Great Alternative Tournament") almost every year since 1994, but the concept predates the creation of the Gran Alternativa. The Mexican professional wrestling company International Wrestling Revolution Group (IWRG; at times referred to as Grupo Internacional Revolución in Mexico) started their own annual rookie/veteran tournament in 2010. The first two tournaments were called Torneo Relampago de Proyeccion a Nuevas Promesas de la Lucha Libre (Spanish for "Projecting a new promise lightning tournament") but would be renamed the El Protector tournament in 2012. The El Protector shows, as well as the majority of the IWRG shows in general, are held in "Arena Naucalpan", owned by the promoters of IWRG and their main arena. The 2018 El Protector show was the ninth time that IWRG promoted a show around the rookie/veteran tournament, with the name changing to El Protector in 2012 and onwards.

=== Storylines ===
The event featured five professional wrestling matches with different wrestlers involved in pre-existing scripted feuds, plots and storylines. Wrestlers were portrayed as either heels (referred to as rudos in Mexico, those that portray the "bad guys") or faces (técnicos in Mexico, the "good guy" characters) as they followed a series of tension-building events, which culminated in a wrestling match or series of matches.

== Results ==
| No. | Results | Stipulations |
|---|---|---|
| 1 | Haziel defeated Skanda | Best two-out-of-three-falls match |
| 2 | Haziel and Super Brazo Jr. defeated Adrenalina and Atomic Star | Best two-out-of-three-falls six-man tag team match |
| 3 | Chico Che defeated Gallo Frances | Best two-out-of-three-falls match |
| 4 | Obett, Trauma II and X-Fly defeated El Hijo del Alebrije, El Hijo del Pantera and Emperador Azteca | Best two-out-of-three-falls six-man tag team match |
| 5 | Los Comandos Elite (Oficial Factor, Oficial Liderk and Oficial Spartan) and Black Warrior defeated Los Terribles Cerebros (Cerebro Negro and Dr. Cerebro), Capo del Norte, Capo del Sur by disqualification | Best two-out-of-three-falls eight-man tag team match |
| 6 | Aramís and Dinamic Black defeated Black Dragon and Dragon Bane and Leroy and Lunatic Extreme and Ram El Carnero and Shadow Boy | El Protector seeding battle royal |
| 7 | Lunatic Extreme and Máscara Año 2000 Jr. defeated El Hijo del Medico Asesino and Leroy | El Protector 2018 first round match |
| 8 | Ram El Carnero and Trauma I defeated Dragon Bane and Eterno | El Protector 2018 first round match |
| 9 | Rokambole Jr. and Villano V Jr. defeated Black Dragon and Veneno | El Protector 2018 first round match |
| 10 | Aramís and El Hijo de Dos Caras defeated Dinamic Black and El Pantera II | El Protector 2018 first round match |
| 11 | Ram El Carnero and Trauma I defeated Lunatic Extreme and Máscara Año 2000 Jr. | El Protector 2018 semi-final match |
| 12 | Rokambole Jr. and Villano V Jr. defeated Aramís and El Hijo de Dos Caras | El Protector 2018 semi-final match |
| 13 | Rokambole Jr. and Villano V Jr. defeated Ram El Carnero and Trauma I | El Protector 2018 final match |
