= IWRG Cabellera vs. Cabellera (February 2018) =

2018 International Wrestling Revolution Group event

- Official poster for the show
- Date: February 11, 2018
- City: Naucalpan, State of Mexico
- Venue: Arena Naucalpan

Event chronology
← Previous; Zona de Ejecucion	Next → El Protector

IWRG Lucha de Apuestas chronology
← Previous; September 2017	Next → March 2018

The IWRG Cabellera vs. Cabellera (Spanish for "Hair vs. Hair") show was a major lucha libre event produced and scripted by Mexican professional wrestling promotion International Wrestling Revolution Group (IWRG), that took place on February 11, 2018 in Arena Naucalpan, Naucalpan, State of Mexico, Mexico. The focal point of the Cabellera vs. Cabellera series of shows is one or more traditional Lucha de Apuestas, or "Bet matches", where all competitors in the match risk their hair on the outcome of the match. The Lucha de Apuestas is considered the most prestigious match type in lucha libre, especially when a wrestlers mask is on the line, but the "hair vs. hair" stipulation is held in almost as high regard.

For the June 2018 Cabellera vs. Cabellera event the recently unmasked Black Dragon defeated Oficial Spartan by disqualification, forcing Spartan to have all his hair shaved off as a result. Black Dragon would later go on to headline and win the February show. The show also featured Emperador Azteca successfully defending the IWRG Intercontinental Welterweight Championship against Cerebro Negro. The show featured five additional bouts.

== Production ==
=== Background ===
In Lucha libre the wrestling mask holds a sacred place, with the most anticipated and prestigious matches being those where a wrestler's mask is on the line, a so-called Lucha de Apuestas, or "bet match" where the loser would be forced to unmask in the middle of the ring and state their birth name. Winning a mask is considered a bigger accomplishment in lucha libre than winning a professional wrestling championship and usually draws more people and press coverage. Losing a mask is often a watershed moment in a wrestler's career, they give up the mystique and prestige of being an enmascarado (masked wrestler) but usually come with a higher than usual payment from the promoter. By the same token a wrestler betting his hair in a Lucha de Apuestas is seen as highly prestigious, usually a step below the mask match.

=== Storylines ===
The event featured five professional wrestling matches with different wrestlers involved in pre-existing scripted feuds, plots and storylines. Wrestlers were portrayed as either heels (referred to as rudos in Mexico, those that portray the "bad guys") or faces (técnicos in Mexico, the "good guy" characters) as they followed a series of tension-building events, which culminated in a wrestling match or series of matches.

== Results ==
No.	Results	Stipulations
1	Skanda defeated Full Contact	Best two-out-of-three-falls match
2	Alas de Acero and Haziel defeated Fandango and Odin	Best two-out-of-three-falls tag team match
3	Demonio Infernal and El Hijo del Alebrije defeated Eterno and Lunatic Xtreme	Best two-out-of-three-falls six-man tag team match
4	Emperador Azteca (c) defeated Cerebro Negro	Best two-out-of-three-falls match for the IWRG Intercontinental Welterweight Championship
5	Las Traumas (Trauma I and Trauma II) and Obett defeated Aramís, El Hijo del Pantera and El Pantera II by Disqualification	Best two-out-of-three-falls tag team match
6	Dr. Cerebro, El Hijo del Medico Asesino and Máscara Año 2000 Jr. defeated Danny Casas, El Hijo de Dos Caras and Imposible	Best two-out-of-three-falls tag team match
7	Black Dragon defeated Oficial Spartan (with Máscara Año 2000 Jr.) by disqualification	Lucha de Apuestas, hair vs. hair match
(c) / – the champion(s) heading into the match
