= Guerra de Sexos (2012) =

2012 International Wrestling Revolution Group event

- Promotional poster featuring various IWRG wrestlers
- Promotion: International Wrestling Revolution Group
- Date: February 5, 2012
- City: Naucalpan, State of Mexico
- Venue: Arena Naucalpan
- Tagline(s): "Guerra de Sexos de Máscaras y Cabelleras"

Event chronology
← Previous; El Protector	Next → IWRG Contra Restos de la Empresas

Guerra de Sexos chronology
← Previous; 2011	Next → —

Guerra de Sexos (2012) (Spanish for "Battle of the Sexes") was the second annual Guerra de Sexos professional wrestling event produced by the International Wrestling Revolution Group. It took place on February 5, 2012, at Arena Naucalpan in Naucalpan, State of Mexico. The event title refers to the main event match, a steel cage match that featured male wrestlers, female wrestlers, Exótico wrestlers and Mini-Estrellas all competing against each other. The last person in the cage would be forced to either remove their wrestling mask, or if already unmask have their hair shaved off. The Under card featured two wrestlers from Asistencia Asesoria y Administracion (AAA), El Texano, Jr. and Toscano, who appeared due to IWRG's working relationship with AAA.

== Production ==
=== Background ===
Starting as far back as at least 2000, the Mexican wrestling promotion International Wrestling Revolution Group (IWRG; Sometimes referred to as Grupo Internacional Revolución in Spanish) has held several annual events where the main event was a multi-man steel cage match where the last wrestler left in the cage would be forced to either remove their wrestling mask or have their hair shaved off under Lucha de Apuestas, or "bet match", rules. Starting in 2011 IWRG began holding a special version of the steel cage match concept under the name Guerra de Sexos, or "War of the Sexes", as they held a show centered on an inter-gender steel cage match main event that saw men and women fight each other with their mask or hair on the line. At times IWRG also included Mini-Estrella competitors and Exótico wrestlers in the cage as well. The inter-gender aspects of the show distinguishes the Guerra de Sexos events from other Steel cage matches held throughout the year such as the IWRG El Castillo del Terror ("The Tower of Terror"), IWRG Guerra del Golfo ("Gulf War") or IWRG Prison Fatal ("Deadly Prison") shows. The Guerra de Sexos shows, as well as the majority of the IWRG shows in general, are held in "Arena Naucalpan", owned by the promoters of IWRG and their main arena. The 2011 Guerra de Sexos show was the first year IWRG promoted a show under that name.

=== Storylines ===
The event featured four professional wrestling matches with different wrestlers involved in pre-existing scripted feuds, plots and storylines. Wrestlers were portrayed as either heels (referred to as rudos in Mexico, those that portray the "bad guys") or faces (técnicos in Mexico, the "good guy" characters) as they followed a series of tension-building events, which culminated in a wrestling match or series of matches.

== Results ==
No.	Results	Stipulations
1	Los Astros (Astro de Plata and Astro Rey, Jr.) and Tritón defeated Los Gemelo Fantásticos (I and II) and Pacto Negro	Six-Man Tag Team Match
2	Alan Extreme and Black Terry defeated Carta Brava, Jr. and Imposible by disqualification	Tag Team Match
3	Eterno defeated Centvrión – two falls to zero	Two Out of Three Falls Match
4	El Consejo (El Texano, Jr. and Toscano) defeated Los Junior Dinamitas (Cien Caras, Jr. and Máscara Año 2000, Jr.)	Tag Team Match
5	Black Terry defeated Chico Che; Also in the match: Angélico, Bracito de Oro, Chucky, Ludark Shaitan, Miss Gaviota, Oficial AK-47, Sexy Lady, Super Nova, Tony Rivera, Veneno and Mosco X-Fly	Intergender 12 Mask vs. Hair Steel Cage Match

Order of escape

1. Ludark Shaitan
2. Chucky
3. Sexy Lady
4. Bracito de Oro
5. Oficial AK-47
6. Miss Gaviota
7. Angélico
8. Veneno
9. Super Nova
10. Mosco X-Fly
11. Tony Rivera
