= El Protector (2014) =

2014 International Wrestling Revolution Group event

- Official poster of the event depicting the veteran participants in the El Protector tournament
- Promotion: International Wrestling Revolution Group
- Date: February 2, 2014
- City: Naucalpan, State of Mexico
- Venue: Arena Naucalpan

Event chronology
← Previous; IWRG 18th Anniversary Show	Next → Rebelión de los Juniors

El Protector chronology
← Previous; 2013	Next → 2015

El Protector (2014) was an annual professional wrestling major event produced by Mexican professional wrestling promotion International Wrestling Revolution Group (IWRG), which took place on February 2, 2014 in Arena Naucalpan, Naucalpan, State of Mexico, Mexico. The 2014 El Protector was the third annual event produced under that name and the first to be held in February. The focal point of the show was the El Protector tag team tournament where seven teams competed for the trophy.

== Production ==
=== Background ===
Lucha Libre has a tradition for a tournament where a rookie, or novato, would be teamed up with an experienced veteran wrestler for a tag team tournament in the hopes of giving the Novato a chance to show case their talent and move up the ranks. Consejo Mundial de Lucha Libre has held a Torneo Gran Alternativa ("Great Alternative Tournament") almost every year since 1994, but the concept predates the creation of the Gran Alternativa. The Mexican professional wrestling company International Wrestling Revolution Group (IWRG; at times referred to as Grupo Internacional Revolución in Mexico) started their own annual rookie/veteran tournament in 2010. The first two tournaments were called Torneo Relampago de Proyeccion a Nuevas Promesas de la Lucha Libre (Spanish for "Projecting a new promise lightning tournament") but would be renamed the El Protector tournament in 2012. The El Protector shows, as well as the majority of the IWRG shows in general, are held in "Arena Naucalpan", owned by the promoters of IWRG and their main arena. The 2014 El Protector show was the fifth time that IWRG promoted a show around the rookie/veteran tournament, with the name changing to El Protector in 2012 and onwards.

=== Storylines ===
The event featured nine professional wrestling matches with different wrestlers involved in pre-existing scripted feuds, plots and storylines. Wrestlers were portrayed as either heels (referred to as rudos in Mexico, those that portray the "bad guys") or faces (técnicos in Mexico, the "good guy" characters) as they followed a series of tension-building events, which culminated in a wrestling match or series of matches.

=== Tournament participants ===
- Arana de Plata (rookie) and Trauma I (veteran)
- Atomic Star (rookie) and Eterno (veteran)
- Dragón Celestia (rookie) and Relámpago (veteran)
- Electro Boy (rookie) and Super Nova (veteran)
- Emperador Azteca (rookie) and Máscara Purpura (veteran)
- Alan Extreme (rookie) and Veneno (veteran)
- El Hijo de Dos Caras (rookie) and Centvrion (veteran)
- Imposible (rookie) and El Hijo de Pirata Morgan (veteran)

== Results ==
No.	Results	Stipulations
1	Cristal, Dama de Hierro and Latigo defeated Diosa Maya, Sadica and Zurdog	Intergender trios tag team two-out-of-three falls match
2	Chico Che, Diva Salvaje and Miss Gaviota defeated El Hijo de Fishman and Los Oficiales (Oficial AK-47 and Oficial Fierro)	Six-man tag team two-out-of-three falls match
3	Oficial 911 (C) defeated Golden Magic	Best two-out-of-three falls match for the IWRG Rey del Ring
4	Alan Extreme and Veneno, Emperador Azteca and Máscara Purpura defeated Arana de Plata and Trauma I, Atomic Star and Eterno, Centvrion and El Hijo de Dos Caras, Dragón Celestia and Relámpago, Electro Boy and Super Nova, El Hijo de Pirata Morgan and Imposible	2014 El Protector seeding Battle Royal
5	Dragón Celestia and Relámpago defeated Centvrion and El Hijo de Dos Caras	2014 El Protector tournament quarter finals, tag team match
6	Electro Boy and Super Nova defeated Arana de Plata and Trauma I	2014 El Protector tournament quarter finals, tag team match
7	Atomic Star and Eterno defeated El Hijo de Pirata Morgan and Imposible	2014 El Protector tournament quarter finals, tag team match
8	Emperador Azteca and Máscara Purpura defeated Alan Extreme and Veneno	2014 El Protector tournament quarter finals, tag team match
9	Electro Boy and Super Nova defeated Dragón Celestia and Relámpago	2014 El Protector tournament semi-finals, tag team match
10	Atomic Star and Eterno defeated Emperador Azteca and Máscara Purpura	2014 El Protector tournament quarter finals, tag team match
11	Electro Boy and Super Nova defeated Atomic Star and Eterno	02014 El Protector tournament finals, tag team match
