= El Protector (2017) =

2017 International Wrestling Revolution Group event

- Official poster for the tournament
- Promotion: International Wrestling Revolution Group
- Date: February 19, 2017
- City: Naucalpan, State of Mexico
- Venue: Arena Naucalpan

Event chronology
← Previous; Máscara vs. Cabellera	Next → Triangular de la Muerte

El Protector chronology
← Previous; 2016	Next → 2018

El Protector (2017) was an annual professional wrestling major event produced by Mexican professional wrestling promotion International Wrestling Revolution Group (IWRG), which took place on February 19, 2017 in Arena Naucalpan, Naucalpan, State of Mexico, Mexico. The 2017 El Protector was the eight annual event produced under that name and the fourth to be held in January. The focal point of the show was the El Protector tag team tournament where eight teams composed of a "rookie" and a "vet" team up to compete for a trophy.

Rookie Diablo Jr. teamed up with veteran Black Terry to win the 2017 El Protector tournament defeating Demonio Infernal and Negro Navarro in the finals. The tournament also saw the teams of Black Dragón and Internacional Pantera, El Hijo de Dos Caras and El Hijo del Alebrije, Herodes Jr. and Imposible, Hip Hop Man and Mr. Electro, Dragón Fly and Villano IV, Alfa and Máscara Año 2000 Jr. participated in the tournament. The show also featured four non-tournament matches.

== Production ==
=== Background ===
Lucha Libre has a tradition for a tournament where a rookie, or novato, would be teamed up with an experienced veteran wrestler for a tag team tournament in the hopes of giving the Novato a chance to show case their talent and move up the ranks. Consejo Mundial de Lucha Libre has held a Torneo Gran Alternativa ("Great Alternative Tournament") almost every year since 1994, but the concept predates the creation of the Gran Alternativa. The Mexican professional wrestling company International Wrestling Revolution Group (IWRG; at times referred to as Grupo Internacional Revolución in Mexico) started their own annual rookie/veteran tournament in 2010. The first two tournaments were called Torneo Relampago de Proyeccion a Nuevas Promesas de la Lucha Libre (Spanish for "Projecting a new promise lightning tournament") but would be renamed the El Protector tournament in 2012. The El Protector shows, as well as the majority of the IWRG shows in general, are held in "Arena Naucalpan", owned by the promoters of IWRG and their main arena. The 2017 El Protector show was the eight time that IWRG promoted a show around the rookie/veteran tournament.

=== Storylines ===
The El Protector event featured 11 professional wrestling matches with different wrestlers involved in pre-existing scripted feuds, plots and storylines. Wrestlers were portrayed as either heels (referred to as rudos in Mexico, those that portray the "bad guys") or faces (técnicos in Mexico, the "good guy" characters) as they followed a series of tension-building events, which culminated in a wrestling match or series of matches.

=== Tournament participants ===
- Alfa (rookie) and Máscara Año 2000 Jr. (veteran)
- Black Dragón (rookie) and Internacional Pantera (veteran)
- Demonio Infernal (rookie) and Negro Navarro (veteran)
- Diablo Jr. (rookie) and Black Terry (veteran)
- Dragón Fly (rookie) and Villano IV (veteran)
- El Hijo del Alebrije (rookie) and El Hijo de Dos Caras (veteran)
- Hip Hop Man (rookie) and Mr. Electro (veteran)
- Imposible (rookie) and Herodes Jr. (veteran)

== Event ==
During the fourth match of the night, Relámpago dove out of the ring at Apolo Estrada Jr., who moved out of the way at the last moment which caused Relámpago to crash into the steel barricade. As a result of the impact, Relámpago was unable to return to the ring and was counted out. It's unclear if this was the planned end or if Relámpago hit the guardrail harder than expected, rendering him unable to get back up.

== Aftermath ==
As a result of winning the 2017 El Protector Diablo Jr. and Black Terry earned a match for the IWRG Intercontinental Tag Team Championship. A week after the tournament Diablo Jr. and Black Terry defeated Chicano and Veneno to win the championship. Their reign as champions lasted for 190 days and included two successful championship defenses until they were defeated by Black Warrior and Warrior Jr. on September 3, 2017.

== Results ==
No.	Results	Stipulations
1	Cadillac and Kanon defeated Acero and Picudo Jr.	Six-man "Lucha Libre rules" tag team match
2	Cerebro Negro, Power Bull, and Súper Mega defeated Pantera I and Los Tortugas Ninjas (Rafy and Teelo)	Six-man "Lucha Libre rules" tag team match
3	Danny Casas defeated Veneno	Tag team match
4	Apolo Estrada Jr. defeated Relámpago by count out	El Protector, seeding battle royal
5	Alfa and Dragón Fly defeated El Hijo del Alebrije, Diablo Jr., Black Dragón, Hip Hop Man, Imposible and Demonio Infernal	El Protector seeding battle royal
6	Black Dragón and Internacional Pantera defeated El Hijo del Alebrije and El Hijo de Dos Caras	El Protector, quarter final match
7	Diablo Jr. I and Black Terry defeated Imposible and Herodes Jr.	El Protector, quarter final match
8	Demonio Infernal and Negro Navarro defeated Hip Hop Man and Mr. Electro	El Protector, quarter final match
9	Dragón Fly and Villano IV defeated Alfa and Máscara Año 2000 Jr.	El Protector, quarter final match
10	Black Terry and Diablo Jr. I defeated Black Dragón and Internacional Pantera	El Protector, semi-final match
11	Demonio Infernal and Negro Navarro defeated Dragón Fly and Villano IV	El Protector, semi-final match
12	Black Terry and Diablo Jr. I defeated Demonio Infernal and Negro Navarro	El Protector, final match
