= El Protector (2013) =

2013 International Wrestling Revolution Group event

- Official poster showing all eight teams in the tournament.
- Promotion: International Wrestling Revolution Group
- Date: January 17, 2013
- City: Naucalpan, State of Mexico
- Venue: Arena Naucalpan
- Tagline: Las Nuevas Promesas de la Lucha Libre

Event chronology
← Previous; IWRG 17th Anniversary Show	Next → Prison Fatal

El Protector chronology
← Previous; 2012	Next → 2014

El Protector (2013) was an annual professional wrestling major event produced by Mexican professional wrestling promotion International Wrestling Revolution Group (IWRG), which took place on January 17, 2013, in Arena Naucalpan, Naucalpan, State of Mexico, Mexico. The 2013 El Protector was the second annual event produced under that name and held in January each year. The focal point of the show was the El Protector tag team tournament where seven teams competed for the trophy.

== Production ==
=== Background ===
Lucha Libre has a tradition for a tournament where a rookie, or novato, would be teamed up with an experienced veteran wrestler for a tag team tournament in the hopes of giving the Novato a chance to show case their talent and move up the ranks. Consejo Mundial de Lucha Libre has held a Torneo Gran Alternativa ("Great Alternative Tournament") almost every year since 1994, but the concept predates the creation of the Gran Alternativa. The Mexican professional wrestling company International Wrestling Revolution Group (IWRG; at times referred to as Grupo Internacional Revolución in Mexico) started their own annual rookie/veteran tournament in 2010. The first two tournaments were called Torneo Relampago de Proyeccion a Nuevas Promesas de la Lucha Libre (Spanish for "Projecting a new promise lightning tournament") but would be renamed the El Protector tournament in 2012. The El Protector shows, as well as the majority of the IWRG shows in general, are held in "Arena Naucalpan", owned by the promoters of IWRG and their main arena. The 2013 El Protector show was the fourth time that IWRG promoted a show around the rookie/veteran tournament, with the name changing to El Protector in 2012 and onwards.

=== Storylines ===
The event featured nine professional wrestling matches with different wrestlers involved in pre-existing scripted feuds, plots and storylines. Wrestlers were portrayed as either heels (referred to as rudos in Mexico, those that portray the "bad guys") or faces (técnicos in Mexico, the "good guy" characters) as they followed a series of tension-building events, which culminated in a wrestling match or series of matches.

=== Tournament participants ===
- Canis Lupus (rookie) and Pirata Morgan (veteran)
- Carta Brava, Jr. (rookie) and X-Fly (veteran)
- Centvrión (rookie) and Veneno (veteran)
- Eita (rookie) and Negro Navarro (veteran)
- Hijo del Pantera (rookie) and Pantera (veteran)
- Kiwby (rookie) and Fuerza Guerrera (veteran)
- Saruman (rookie) and El Solar (veteran)

Of all the teams only Hijo del Pantera and Pantera have teamed up in the past as the father/son team worked together in many matches before this show. Previous tournaments included eight teams, but for unknown reasons the 2013 tournament only had seven teams. IWRG solved the number problem by holding a "seeding" Battle Royal to determine the tournament brackets, including having the winner of the battle royal advance straight to the semi-main event. The Battle Royal included the seven "rookies" representing their teams.

== Results ==
No.	Results	Stipulations
1	Dragón Celestial defeated Serpiente de Oro	Singles match
2	Fulgore and Imposible defeated Astro Rey, Jr. and Galaxy – two falls to one	Tag team best two-out-of-three falls tag team match
3	Cerebro Negro, Eterno and Súper Nova defeated Chico Che, Dinamic Black and El Ángel	Six-man tag team Two out of three falls match – two falls to one
4	Centvrión defeated Carta Brava, Jr., Eita, Hijo del Pantera, Saruman, Canis Lupus and Kiwby	2013 El Protector seeding Battle Royal
5	Hijo del Pantera and Pantera defeated Saruman and El Solar	2013 El Protector tournament quarter finals, tag team match
6	Carta Brava, Jr. and X-Fly defeated Kiwby and Fuerza Guerrera	2013 El Protector tournament quarter finals, tag team match
7	Eita and Negro Navarro defeated Canis Lupus and Pirata Morgan	2013 El Protector tournament quarter finals, tag team match
8	Carta Brava, Jr. and X-Fly defeated Hijo del Pantera and Pantera	2013 El Protector tournament semi-finals, tag team match
9	Eita and Negro Navarro defeated Centvrión and Veneno	2013 El Protector tournament semi-finals, tag team match
10	Carta Brava, Jr. and X-Fly defeated Eita and Negro Navarro	2013 El Protector tournament finals, tag team match
