= El Protector (2015) =

2015 International Wrestling Revolution Group event

- Official poster for the show depicting all the competitors in the El Protector tournament.
- Promotion: International Wrestling Revolution Group
- Date: February 15, 2015
- City: Naucalpan, State of Mexico
- Venue: Arena Naucalpan

Event chronology
← Previous; IWRG 19th Anniversary Show	Next → Rebelión de los Juniors

El Protector chronology
← Previous; 2014	Next → 2016

El Protector (2015) was an annual professional wrestling major event produced by Mexican professional wrestling promotion International Wrestling Revolution Group (IWRG), which took place on February 15, 2015 in Arena Naucalpan, Naucalpan, State of Mexico, Mexico. The 2015 El Protector was the fourth annual event produced under that name and the second to be held in February. The focal point of the show was the El Protector tag team tournament where seven teams competed for the trophy.

== Production ==
=== Background ===
Lucha Libre has a tradition for a tournament where a rookie, or novato, would be teamed up with an experienced veteran wrestler for a tag team tournament in the hopes of giving the Novato a chance to show case their talent and move up the ranks. Consejo Mundial de Lucha Libre has held a Torneo Gran Alternativa ("Great Alternative Tournament") almost every year since 1994, but the concept predates the creation of the Gran Alternativa. The Mexican professional wrestling company International Wrestling Revolution Group (IWRG; at times referred to as Grupo Internacional Revolución in Mexico) started their own annual rookie/veteran tournament in 2010. The first two tournaments were called Torneo Relampago de Proyeccion a Nuevas Promesas de la Lucha Libre (Spanish for "Projecting a new promise lightning tournament") but would be renamed the El Protector tournament in 2012. The El Protector shows, as well as the majority of the IWRG shows in general, are held in "Arena Naucalpan", owned by the promoters of IWRG and their main arena. The 2015 El Protector show was the sixth time that IWRG promoted a show around the rookie/veteran tournament, with the name changing to El Protector in 2012 and onwards.

=== Storylines ===
The event featured nine professional wrestling matches with different wrestlers involved in pre-existing scripted feuds, plots and storylines. Wrestlers were portrayed as either heels (referred to as rudos in Mexico, those that portray the "bad guys") or faces (técnicos in Mexico, the "good guy" characters) as they followed a series of tension-building events, which culminated in a wrestling match or series of matches.

=== Tournament participants ===
- Anubis Black (rookie) and Pirata Morgan (veteran)
- Emperador Azteca (rookie) and El Hijo de Dos Caras (veteran)
- Metaleon (rookie) and Negro Navarro (veteran)
- Dragón Celestial (rookie) and Veneno (veteran)
- Electro Boy (rookie) and X-Fly (veteran)
- Atomic Star (rookie) and Eterno (veteran)
- Alfa (rookie) and Máscara Sagrada (veteran)
- Hip Hop Man (rookie) and El Hijo del Diablo (veteran)

== Results ==
No.	Results	Stipulations
1	Douki and Power Bull defeated Galaxy and Omega	Best two-out-of-three falls tag team match
2	Dark Lady, Kamilion and La Sadica defeated Black Fury, Hahastary and Sadic Maiden	Best two-out-of-three falls six-man "Lucha Libre rules" tag team match
3	Anubis Black and Pirata Morgan defeated Emperador Azteca and El Hijo de Dos Caras	El Protector, quarter final match
4	Metaleon and Negro Navarro defeated Dragón Celestial and Veneno	El Protector, quarter final match
5	Electro Boy and X-Fly defeated Atomic Star and Eterno	El Protector, quarter final match
6	Alfa and Máscara Sagrada defeated Hip Hop Man and El Hijo del Diablo	El Protector, quarter final match
7	Metaleon and Negro Navarro defeated Electro Boy and X-Fly	El Protector, semi-final match
8	Anubis Black and Pirata Morgan defeated Alfa and Máscara Sagrada by countout	El Protector, semi-final match
9	Metaleon and Negro Navarro defeated Anubis Black and Pirata Morgan	El Protector, final match
10	Chicano and Danny Casas (c) defeated Los Primos Dinamitas (Hijo del Máscara Año 2000 and Universo 2000 Jr.)	tag team match for the IWRG Intercontinental Tag Team Championship
(c) / – the champion(s) heading into the match
