= Arena Naucalpan 38th Anniversary Show =

2015 International Wrestling Revolution Group event

- IWRG;s official poster for the show
- Promotion: International Wrestling Revolution Group
- Date: December 20, 2015
- City: Naucalpan, State of Mexico
- Venue: Arena Naucalpan
- Tagline(s): Caeran 2 Cabelleras (Two scalps will fall)

Event chronology
← Previous; El Castillo del Terror	Next → IWRG 20th Anniversary Show

Arena Naucalpan Anniversary Shows chronology
← Previous; 37th Anniversary	Next → 39th Anniversary

The Arena Naucalpan 38th Anniversary Show was a major annual professional wrestling event produced by Mexican professional wrestling promotion International Wrestling Revolution Group (IWRG), which took place on December 20, 2015 in Arena Naucalpan, Naucalpan, State of Mexico, Mexico. The show celebrated the 38th Anniversary of the construction of Arena Naucalpan, IWRG's main venue. In the main event the team known as Los Insoportables ("The Unbearables"; Eterno and Apolo Estrada Jr.) defeated Los Terribles Cerebros ("The Terrible Brains"; Black Terry and Dr. Cerebro), as a result of their loss Black Terry and Dr. Cerebro had all their hair shaved off under Luchas de Apuestas rules. The show also saw El Hijo de Dos Caras successfully defend the IWRG Intercontinental Heavyweight Championship and Imposible successfully defend the IWRG Intercontinental Lightweight Championship.

== Production ==
=== Background ===
Promoter Adolfo Moreno had promoted Lucha Libre, or professional wrestling in Naucalpan, State of Mexico, Mexico prior to financing the building of Arena Naucalpan that opened in late 1976. Originally Moreno worked together with the Universal Wrestling Association (UWA) and then later Consejo Mundial de Lucha Libre (CMLL) as a local promoter. On January 1, 1996 Moreno created International Wrestling Revolution Group (IWRG) as an independent promotion. IWRG celebrates the anniversary of Arena Naucalpan each year in December with a major show, making it the second oldest, still promoted show series in the world. pre-dating WrestleMania by eight years. Only the CMLL Anniversary Show series has a longer history. The 2015 Arena Naucalpan anniversary show will mark the 38th Anniversary of Arena Naucalpan. The Anniversary shows, as well as the majority of the IWRG shows in general are held in Arena Naucalpan.

=== Storylines ===
The event featured a total of five professional wrestling matches with different wrestlers involved in pre-existing scripted feuds, plots and storylines. Wrestlers portrayed themselves as either heels (referred to as rudos in Mexico, those that portray the "bad guys") or faces (técnicos in Mexico, the "good guy" characters) as they followed a series of tension-building events, which culminated in a wrestling match or series of matches.

== Results ==
No.	Results	Stipulations
1	Los Tortugas Ninjas (Rafy, Leo and Mike) and Freeyser defeated Avisman, Diablo Jr. I, Hip Hop Man and Violencia Jr.	Best two-out-of-three falls eight-man Atomicos tag team match
2	Imposible (c) defeated Pantera I	Best two-out-of-three falls match for the IWRG Intercontinental Lightweight Championship
3	Máscara Año 2000 Jr., Negro Navarro, Pirata Morgan and Trauma II defeated Danny Casas, Veneno, Rafy and Toscano	Best two-out-of-three falls eight-man Atomicos tag team match
4	El Hijo de Dos Caras (c) defeated Trauma I	Best two-out-of-three falls match for the IWRG Intercontinental Heavyweight Championship
5	Los Insoportables (Eterno and Apolo Estrada Jr.) defeated Los Terribles Cerebros (Black Terry and Dr. Cerebro)	Best two-out-of-three falls tag team Luchas de Apuestas. hairs vs. hairs. match
(c) / – the champion(s) heading into the match
