= Proyeccion a Nuevas Promesas (2010) =

2010 International Wrestling Revolution Group event

- Official poster of the event depicting the 8 veterans in the tournament
- Promotion: International Wrestling Revolution Group
- Date: January 1, 2010
- City: Naucalpan, State of Mexico
- Venue: Arena Naucalpan

Event chronology
← Previous; Arena Naucalpan 32nd Anniversary Show	Next → IWRG 13th Anniversary Show

Proyeccion a Nuevas Promesas chronology
← Previous; First	Next → 2011

IWRG Anniversary Shows chronology
← Previous; 13th Anniversary	Next → 15th Anniversary

Proyeccion a Nuevas Promesas (2010), short for Torneo Relampago de Proyeccion a Nuevas Promesas de la Lucha Libre (Spanish for "Projecting a new promise lightning tournament") was the first annual Proyeccion a Nuevas Promesas professional wrestling event produced by the International Wrestling Revolution Group. It took place on January 1, 2010, at Arena Naucalpan in Naucalpan, State of Mexico. The focal point of the show was the Torneo Relampago de Proyeccion a Nuevas Promesas de la Lucha Libre tag team tournament where eight teams competed for the trophy. In 2012 the tournament was renamed El Protector but the tournament concept remained the same. This event was also the 14th IWRG Anniversary Show.

== Production ==
=== Background ===
Lucha Libre has a tradition for a tournament where a rookie, or novato, would be teamed up with an experienced veteran wrestler for a tag team tournament in the hopes of giving the Novato a chance to show case their talent and move up the ranks. Consejo Mundial de Lucha Libre has held a Torneo Gran Alternativa ("Great Alternative Tournament") almost every year since 1994, but the concept predates the creation of the Gran Alternativa. The Mexican professional wrestling company International Wrestling Revolution Group (IWRG; at times referred to as Grupo Internacional Revolución in Mexico) started their own annual rookie/veteran tournament in 2010. The first two tournaments were called Torneo Relampago de Proyeccion a Nuevas Promesas de la Lucha Libre (Spanish for "Projecting a new promise lightning tournament") but would be renamed the El Protector tournament in 2012. The Proyeccion a Nuevas Promesas shows, as well as the majority of the IWRG shows in general, are held in "Arena Naucalpan", owned by the promoters of IWRG and their main arena. The 2010 Proyeccion a Nuevas Promesas show was the first time that IWRG promoted a show around the rookie/veteran tournament, with the name changing to El Protector in 2012 and onwards.

=== Storylines ===
The event featured nine professional wrestling matches with different wrestlers involved in pre-existing scripted feuds, plots and storylines. Wrestlers were portrayed as either heels (referred to as rudos in Mexico, those that portray the "bad guys") or faces (técnicos in Mexico, the "good guy" characters) as they followed a series of tension-building events, which culminated in a wrestling match or series of matches.

=== Tournament participants ===
- Tetsuya Bushi (rookie) and Guerrero 2000 (Veteran)
- Comando Negro (rookie) and Oficial 911 (Veteran)
- Dinamic Black (rookie) and Chico Che (Veteran)
- Alan Extreme (rookie) and Black Terry (Veteran)
- Guizmo (rookie) and Ultraman, Jr. (Veteran)
- Hijo del Signo (rookie) and Dr. Cerebro (Veteran)
- Imperial (rookie) and Rocket (rookie)
- Keshin Black (rookie) and Veneno (Veteran)

== Results ==
No.	Results	Stipulations
1	Avisman and Flama Infernal defeated Eragon and Volaris	Tag team best two-out-of-three falls tag team match
2	Guizmo and Ultraman, Jr. defeated Keshin Black and Veneno	2010 Torneo Relampago de Proyeccion a Nuevas Promesas de la Lucha Libre tournament quarter finals, tag team match
3	Hijo del Signo and Dr. Cerebro defeated Imperial and Rocket	2010 Torneo Relampago de Proyeccion a Nuevas Promesas de la Lucha Libre tournament quarter finals, tag team match
4	Dinamic Black and Chico Che defeated Alan Extreme and Black Terry	2010 Torneo Relampago de Proyeccion a Nuevas Promesas de la Lucha Libre tournament quarter finals, tag team match
5	Comando Negro and Oficial 911 and defeated Tetsuya Bushi and Guerrero 2000	2010 Torneo Relampago de Proyeccion a Nuevas Promesas de la Lucha Libre tournament quarter finals, tag team match
6	Fantasma de la Opera and Gringo Loco defeated Los Traumas (Trauma I and Trauma II)	Tag team best two-out-of-three falls tag team match
7	Hijo del Signo and Dr. Cerebro defeated Guizmo and Ultraman Jr.	2010 Torneo Relampago de Proyeccion a Nuevas Promesas de la Lucha Libre tournament semi-finals, tag team match
8	Comando Negro and Oficial 911 defeated Dinamic Black and Chico Che	2010 Torneo Relampago de Proyeccion a Nuevas Promesas de la Lucha Libre tournament semi-finals, tag team match
9	Hijo del Signo and Dr. Cerebro defeated Comando Negro and Oficial 911	2010 Torneo Relampago de Proyeccion a Nuevas Promesas de la Lucha Libre tournament finals, tag team match
