= El Protector (2012) =

2012 International Wrestling Revolution Group event

- Promotional poster featuring various IWRG wrestlers
- Promotion: International Wrestling Revolution Group
- Date: January 12, 2012
- City: Naucalpan, State of Mexico
- Venue: Arena Naucalpan
- Tagline(s): Las Nuevas Promesas de la Lucha Libre

Event chronology
← Previous; IWRG 16th Anniversary Show	Next → Guerra de Sexos

El Protector chronology
← Previous; 2011	Next → 2013

El Protector (2012) was the first annual El Protector professional wrestling event produced by the International Wrestling Revolution Group. It took place on January 12, 2012, at Arena Naucalpan in Naucalpan, State of Mexico. The 2012 El Protector was the first event produced under that name, but was a continuation of the Proyeccion a Nuevas Promesas ("Projecting a new promise") tournament of 2010 and 2011 . The focal point of the show was the El Protector tag team tournament where eight teams competed for the trophy.

== Production ==
=== Background ===
Lucha Libre has a tradition for a tournament where a rookie, or novato, would be teamed up with an experienced veteran wrestler for a tag team tournament in the hopes of giving the Novato a chance to show case their talent and move up the ranks. Consejo Mundial de Lucha Libre has held a Torneo Gran Alternativa ("Great Alternative Tournament") almost every year since 1994, but the concept predates the creation of the Gran Alternativa. The Mexican professional wrestling company International Wrestling Revolution Group (IWRG; at times referred to as Grupo Internacional Revolución in Mexico) started their own annual rookie/veteran tournament in 2010. The first two tournaments were called Torneo Relampago de Proyeccion a Nuevas Promesas de la Lucha Libre (Spanish for "Projecting a new promise lightning tournament") but would be renamed the El Protector tournament in 2012. The El Protector shows, as well as the majority of the IWRG shows in general, are held in "Arena Naucalpan", owned by the promoters of IWRG and their main arena. The 2012 El Protector show was the third time that IWRG promoted a show around the rookie/veteran tournament, with the name changing to El Protector from this year and onwards.

=== Storylines ===
The event featured nine professional wrestling matches with different wrestlers involved in pre-existing scripted feuds, plots and storylines. Wrestlers were portrayed as either heels (referred to as rudos in Mexico, those that portray the "bad guys") or faces (técnicos in Mexico, the "good guy" characters) as they followed a series of tension-building events, which culminated in a wrestling match or series of matches.

=== Tournament participants ===
- Angélico (rookie) and Dinamic Black (veteran)
- Carta Brava, Jr. (rookie) and Máscara Año 2000, Jr. (veteran)
- Centvrión (rookie) and Negro Navarro (veteran)
- Eterno (rookie) and Apolo Estrada, Jr. (veteran)
- Alan Extreme (rookie) and Black Terry (veteran)
- Imposible (rookie) and X-Fly (veteran)
- Saruman (rookie) and Veneno (veteran)
- Tritón (rookie) and Tony Rivera (veteran)

== Results ==
No.	Results	Stipulations
1	Astro de Plata and Astro Rey, Jr. defeated Pacto Negro and Rambo, Jr. – two falls to zero	Tag team best two-out-of-three falls tag team match
2	Golden Magic and Los Oficiales Elite (Oficial Rayan and Oficial Spartan) defeated Kortiz and Los Gemelos Fantasticos (Gemelo Fantástico I and Gemelo Fantástico II) by disqualification	Six-man tag team Two out of three falls match
3	Carta Brava, Jr. and Máscara Año 2000, Jr. defeated Tritón and Tony Rivera	2012 El Protector tournament quarter finals, tag team match
4	Centvrión and Negro Navarro defeated Angélico and Dinamic Black	2012 El Protector tournament quarter finals, tag team match
5	Saruman and Veneno defeated Alan Extreme and Black Terry	2012 El Protector tournament quarter finals, tag team match
6	Imposible and X-Fly defeated Eterno and Apolo Estrada, Jr.	2012 El Protector tournament quarter finals, tag team match
7	Centvrión and Negro Navarro defeated Carta Brava, Jr. and Máscara Año 2000, Jr.	2012 El Protector tournament semi-finals, tag team match
8	Imposible and X-Fly defeated Saruman and Veneno	2012 El Protector tournament semi-finals, tag team match
9	Imposible and X-Fly defeated Centvrión and Negro Navarro	2012 El Protector tournament finals, tag team match
