= Canis Lupus (wrestler) =

Mexican professional wrestler

Personal information
- Born: Héctor Juan López Vieyra; November 25, 1984 (age 41) Naucalpan, State of Mexico, Mexico

Professional wrestling career
- Ring names: Comando Negro; Canis Lupus
- Billed height: 178 cm (5 ft 10 in)
- Billed weight: 99 kg (218 lb)
- Trained by: Avisman; Black Terry; Freelance; Mike Segura; Arkangel de la Muerte
- Debut: April 12, 2008
- Retired: November 20, 2016 (Note: Date of last recorded match.)

Héctor Juan López Vieyra (born November 25, 1984) is a Mexican professional wrestler, who is best known for his time with International Wrestling Revolution Group (IWRG) under the ring name Canis Lupus. He has previously worked under the ring name Comando Negro from 2009 to 2012. Near the end of 2012, López took over the Canis Lupus character when the first wrestler to use the name was replaced by IWRG. "Canis Lupus" is Latin for wolf, something that was reflected in the mask, that he wore prior to September 2016, which is adorned with stylized wolf features such as ears.

Canis Lupus, alongside Apolo Estrada Jr., Eterno and Relampargo, teamed together to form a group known as Los Insoportables (Spanish for "The Unbearable"), a rudo ("bad guys") team. He is a former holder of the IWRG Intercontinental Lightweight Championship, the IWRG Intercontinental Welterweight Championship and the IWRG Intercontinental Lightweight Championship which he held with Eterno. From 2008 through to 2012, he worked under the name "Comando Negro", where he won the 2011 Proyeccion a Nuevas Promesas tournament with Scorpio Jr.

== Professional wrestling career ==
The wrestler who would later be known as "Canis Lupus" was initially trained by Arkangel de la Muerte as part of the Consejo Mundial de Lucha Libre (CMLL) wrestling school located in Mexico City. Due to the secrecy that surrounds enmascarados ("Masked wrestlers"), it has not been revealed what ring name he used while training with Arkangel de la Muerte, just that he trained with him but never graduated to working for CMLL itself.

=== Comando Negro (2008–2012) ===
He stopped training under Arkangel de la Muerte at some point in either 2007 or 2008 and began training in the International Wrestling Revolution Group's (IWRG) training school in 2008, training under Avisman, Black Terry, Freelance and Mike Segura. He made his official in-ring debut for IWRG on April 12, 2008, working as the masked character "Comando Negro" ("Black Commando"), the latest wrestler to use the Los Comandos characters that IWRG originally introduced in 2003, he was even teamed up with one of the original Comandos, Comando Gama. In early 2010 Comando Negro was teamed up with Oficial 911 for a one-night tournament called Torneo Relampago de Proyeccion a Nuevas Promesas de la Lucha Libre (Spanish for "Projecting a new promise lightning tournament"), a tournament where an IWRG rookie teamed up with an IWRG veteran wrestler for one night. The duo defeated Guerrero 2000 and Tetsuya Bushi in the first round, then the team of Chico Che and Dinamic Black in the second round, but lost to El Hijo del Signo and Dr. Cerebro in the finals.

In the fall of 2010, Comando Negro became involved in his first long-running storyline, a feud with his trainer Freelance. The storyline was that Freelance felt disrespected by Comando Negro while Comando Negro felt that Freelance was trying to hold him back. The feud ended with a Lucha de Apuestas, or "Bet match", where Comando Negro defended his mask, defeating Freelance and thus forcing his trainer to be shaved bald as a result of the loss. Two days later, Comando Negro won IWRG's Torneo FILL, a tournament where IWRG trainees face off against other wrestling schools from around Mexico. On November 11, 2010, Comando Negro was one of twelve wrestlers who competed in IWRG's annual El Castillo del Terror ("The Castle of Terror") steel cage match where one wrestler would be unmasked by the end of the match. In the end Comando Negro was the last man to escape the cage, forcing Arlequín Negro to unmask. After his success in El Castillo del Terror, he went on to defeat Chico Che the following month, leaving Chico Che bald as a result of his loss. He extended his late 2010 run of successful Apuestas match wins as he defeated El Pollo to unmask him on December 26.

After a year in which Comando Negro had been pushed heavily, Comando Negro was teamed up with Scorpio Jr. for the second Proyeccion a Nuevas Promesas tournament. The duo defeated Eterno and Veneno in the first round, Dinamic Black and Negro Navarro in the second round and Multifacético and Trauma I in the finals to win the entire tournament. On January 30, 2011, IWRG decided to have Comando Negro win the IWRG Intercontinental Lightweight Championship from Dr. Cerebro as part of their efforts to promote him. The reign as lightweight champion lasted until November 3, 2011, where he was defeated by Dinamic Black as part of IWRG's annual El Castillo del Terror show. Comando Negro was one of nine wrestlers that competed in a steel cage match as part of the 2012 Guerra del Golfo show. Comando Negro escaped the cage to keep his mask while Oficial Factor lost the match. By the end of 2012, Comando Negro added another Apuestas victory as he won the mask of Guerrero Mixto Jr. on December 25, 2012.

=== Canis Lupus (2013–2016) ===
IWRG decided to give Comando Negro a new ring character, instead of tying him to the old "Los Comandos" characters. The mask and name had originally been given to someone else, but that person left IWRG in late 2012, which meant that the former Comando Negro became known as "Canis Lupus" (Latin for wolf) and a mask that looked like a wolf's face and ring wear that matches the name. After working in the middle of the card for months, Canis Lupus outlasted Astro Rey Jr., Avisman, Carta Brava Jr., Douki, El Ángel, Fulgor I, and Oficial Rayan to win the vacant IWRG Intercontinental Welterweight Championship. The following month he defended the championship on a non-IWRG show, defeating Guerrero Maya Jr. to retain the championship. By the end of the year, Canis Lupus became involved in a storyline feud with Golden Magic, which saw Golden Magic win the welterweight championship on December 5.

As part of the feud, Canis Lupus joined the rudo team known as "Los Insoportables" ("The Unbearable"; Eterno and Apolo Estrada Jr. as his back up in the feud. On December 25, 2014, Canis Lupus and Eterno teamed up to defeat Chicano and Imposible to win the vacant IWRG Intercontinental Tag Team Championship. Their reign lasted 31 days as Chicano and Danny Casas won the titles on January 25. The feud with Golden Magic resulted in a Lucha de Apuestas match between the two where Canis Lupus put his mask on the line and Golden Magic risked the IWRG Intercontinental Welterweight Championship. Canis Lupus won the match and the championship to start his second reign with the title on November 16, 2014. On April 18, 2016, Canis Lupus announced that he was vacating the Welterweight championship as he wanted to challenge for the IWRG Intercontinental Heavyweight Championship instead.

The move to the heavyweight division kicked off a three-way storyline feud between Canis Lupus, Trauma I and Máscara Año 2000 Jr. that would play out over the summer and fall of 2016. At IWRG's August Máscara vs. Cabellera show, Canis Lupus defeated Máscara Año 2000 Jr., to win his hair, in a match where Trauma I tried to help Máscara Año 2000 Jr. After the match Trauma I made a challenge for Canis Lupus to put his mask on the line, a challenge that was quickly accepted. The match was the main event of IWRG's September IWRG Máscara vs. Máscara show and saw Trauma I win the third and deciding fall by submission. Afterwards Canis Lupus unmasked and revealed his real name, Héctor Juan López Vieyra, per lucha libre traditions. In the months after his mask loss Canis Lupus won the Copa Huracán Ramiez by outlasting 15 other wrestlers. Karla, the original Huracán Ramírez's daughter, her husband and their son Daniel, presented Canis Lupus with the trophy after the victory. His last known match under the name Canis Lupus took place on November 20, 2016, after which he either retired from wrestling or adopted another masked character.

== Personal life ==
Héctor Juan López Vieyra was born on November 25, 1984, in Naucalpan, State of Mexico, Mexico. After his mask loss, while still in the ring and covered in blood, López proposed to his then girlfriend, who said yes.

== Championships and accomplishments ==
- International Wrestling Revolution Group

- IWRG Intercontinental Lightweight Championship (1 time)
- IWRG Intercontinental Tag Team Championship (1 time) – with Eterno
- IWRG Intercontinental Welterweight Championship (2 times)
- Torneo FILL: October 2010
- Proyeccion a Nuevas Promesas tournament: 2011 – with Scorpio Jr.
- La Copa Huracán Ramírez

== Luchas de Apuestas record ==
Winner (wager)	Loser (wager)	Location	Event	Date	Notes
Comando Negro (mask)	Freelance (hair)	Naucalpan, State of Mexico	IWRG Live Event	September 10, 2010	
Comando Negro (mask)	Arlequín Negro (mask)	Naucalpan, Mexico State	El Castillo del Terror	November 4, 2010	(Note: Last two men in a steel cage match that also included Oficial 911, Oficial AK-47, Alan Extreme, Carta Brava, Jr., Centauro, El Hijo de Anibal, El Hijo del Cien Caras, El Hijo de Pirata Morgan, Máscara Año 2000, Jr. and Trauma I.)
Comando Negro (mask)	Chico Che (hair)	Naucalpan, State of Mexico	IWRG Live Event	December 9, 2010	
Comando Negro (mask)	El Pollo (mask)	Naucalpan, State of Mexico	IWRG Live Event	December 26, 2010	
Comando Negro (mask)	Guerrero Mixto Jr. (hair)	Nezahualcoyotl, Mexico State	Live Event	December 25, 2012	
Canis Lupus (mask)	Máscara Año 2000 Jr. (hair)	Naucalpan, State of Mexico	Máscara vs. Cabellera	August 7, 2016	
Trauma I (mask)	Canis Lupus (mask)	Naucalpan, Mexico State	Máscara vs. Máscara	September 4, 2016	
