= Proyeccion a Nuevas Promesas (2011) =

2011 International Wrestling Revolution Group event

- Official poster of the event depicting the 8 teams in the tournament
- Promotion: International Wrestling Revolution Group
- Date: January 1, 2011
- City: Naucalpan, State of Mexico
- Venue: Arena Naucalpan

Event chronology
← Previous; Guerra de Empresas	Next → Caravana de Campeones

Proyeccion a Nuevas Promesas chronology
← Previous; 2010	Next → 2012

Proyeccion a Nuevas Promesas (2011), short for Torneo Relampago de Proyeccion a Nuevas Promesas de la Lucha Libre (Spanish for "Projecting a new promise lightning tournament") was the first annual Proyeccion a Nuevas Promesas professional wrestling event produced by the International Wrestling Revolution Group. It took place on January 13, 2011, at Arena Naucalpan in Naucalpan, State of Mexico. The focal point of the show was the Torneo Relampago de Proyeccion a Nuevas Promesas de la Lucha Libre tag team tournament where eight teams competed for the trophy. In 2012 the tournament was renamed El Protector but the tournament concept remained the same

== Production ==
=== Background ===
Lucha Libre has a tradition for a tournament where a rookie, or novato, would be teamed up with an experienced veteran wrestler for a tag team tournament in the hopes of giving the Novato a chance to show case their talent and move up the ranks. Consejo Mundial de Lucha Libre has held a Torneo Gran Alternativa ("Great Alternative Tournament") almost every year since 1994, but the concept predates the creation of the Gran Alternativa. The Mexican professional wrestling company International Wrestling Revolution Group (IWRG; at times referred to as Grupo Internacional Revolución in Mexico) started their own annual rookie/veteran tournament in 2010. The first two tournaments were called Torneo Relampago de Proyeccion a Nuevas Promesas de la Lucha Libre (Spanish for "Projecting a new promise lightning tournament") but would be renamed the El Protector tournament in 2012. The Proyeccion a Nuevas Promesas shows, as well as the majority of the IWRG shows in general, are held in "Arena Naucalpan", owned by the promoters of IWRG and their main arena. The 2010 Proyeccion a Nuevas Promesas show was the first time that IWRG promoted a show around the rookie/veteran tournament, with the name changing to El Protector in 2012 and onwards.

=== Storylines ===
The event featured nine professional wrestling matches with different wrestlers involved in pre-existing scripted feuds, plots and storylines. Wrestlers were portrayed as either heels (referred to as rudos in Mexico, those that portray the "bad guys") or faces (técnicos in Mexico, the "good guy" characters) as they followed a series of tension-building events, which culminated in a wrestling match or series of matches.

=== Tournament participants ===
- Comando Negro Rookie and Scorpio, Jr. Veteran
- Dinamic Black Rookie and Negro Navarro Veteran
- Eterno Rookie and Veneno Veteran
- Alan Extreme Rookie and Chico Che Veteran
- Hijo de Pirata Morgan Rookie and Hammer Veteran
- Keshin Black Rookie and Black Terry Veteran
- Muerte Infernal Rookie and Hijo del Diablo Veteran
- Multifacetico Rookie and Trauma I Veteran

== Results ==
No.	Results	Stipulations
1	Epidemia and Imposible defeated Heros and Mascarita de Oro	Tag team best two-out-of-three falls tag team match
2	Eragon and Flama Infernal defeated Carta Brava, Jr. and Guerrero 2000 – two falls to one	Tag team best two-out-of-three falls tag team match
3	Keshin Black and Black Terry defeated Muerte Infernal and Hijo del Diablo	2011 Torneo Relampago de Proyeccion a Nuevas Promesas de la Lucha Libre tournament quarter finals, tag team match
4	Multifacetico and Trauma I defeated Alan Extreme and Chico Che	2011 Torneo Relampago de Proyeccion a Nuevas Promesas de la Lucha Libre tournament quarter finals, tag team match
5	Dinamic Black and Negro Navarro defeated Hijo de Pirata Morgan and Hammer	2011 Torneo Relampago de Proyeccion a Nuevas Promesas de la Lucha Libre tournament quarter finals, tag team match
6	Comando Negro and Scorpio, Jr. defeated Eterno and Veneno	2011 Torneo Relampago de Proyeccion a Nuevas Promesas de la Lucha Libre tournament quarter finals, tag team match
7	Multifacetico and Trauma I defeated Keshin Black and Black Terry	2011 Torneo Relampago de Proyeccion a Nuevas Promesas de la Lucha Libre tournament semi-finals, tag team match
8	Comando Negro and Scorpio, Jr. defeated Dinamic Black and Negro Navarro	2011 Torneo Relampago de Proyeccion a Nuevas Promesas de la Lucha Libre tournament semi-finals, tag team match
9	Comando Negro and Scorpio, Jr. defeated Multifacetico and Trauma I	2011 Torneo Relampago de Proyeccion a Nuevas Promesas de la Lucha Libre tournament finals, tag team match
