= Dr. Cerebro =

Mexican professional wrestler

Personal information
- Born: Alejandro Jiménez Cruz; April 21, 1972 (age 54) Oaxaca, Mexico

Professional wrestling career
- Ring name: Dr. Cerebro
- Billed height: 1.73 m (5 ft 8 in)
- Billed weight: 91 kg (201 lb)
- Trained by: Impala; Sado Flores; Scorpio
- Debut: June 1996

Alejandro Jiménez Cruz (born April 21, 1972) is a Mexican professional wrestler, best known under the ring name Dr. Cerebro (Spanish for "Doctor Brain"). He has been associated with the Mexican promotion International Wrestling Revolution Group (IWRG) since his debut in 1996 and has portrayed both a tecnico ("Good guy") and a Rudo ("bad guy") wrestling character. He is also a licensed Chiropractor.

== Professional wrestling career ==
Alejandro Jiménez Cruz was the second person to use the "Dr. Cerebro" ring name in professional wrestling, taking over both the name and the mask from José Mercado López, better known as Pentagón II / Pentagón Black upon his wrestling debut. The ring character was that of an "evil doctor", complete with wearing totally white ring gear and mask, where it looked like the top of the cranium had been removed to show the brain. On September 16, 1997 Dr. Cerebro teamed up other young wrestlers from International Wrestling Revolution Group (IWRG), Fantasy, Mr. Águila, Neblina and Tony Rivera to defeat the team of Toryumon trainees Judo Suwa, Lyguila, Magnum Tokyo, Shiima Nobunaga and Sumo Fuji to win the Copa Higher Power tournament. A few months later he competed in Toryumon's Young Dragon's Cup, defeating SAITO in the first round before losing to Magnum Tokyo in the semi-finals. On January 18, 1998 the team of Dr Cerebro, Hijo del Gladiador, El Felino, Mr. Niebla, Tigre Blanco, Tony Rivera and Venum Black lost that year's Copa Higher Power to the Toryumon team of Suwa, Lyguila, Tokyo, Saito, Fuji and their trainer Último Dragón. In early 1998 IWRG created the IWRG Intercontinental Welterweight Championship and held a month-long tournament to determine their inaugural champion. Dr. Cerebro defeated Oro, Jr. in the first round, Star Boy in the second round and finally defeated SHiima Nobunaga in the finals of the tournament to become the first ever champion. Over the summer of 1998 Dr. Cerebro began a storyline feud with the tecnico (wrestler who portrays the "good guy") Oro, Jr., starting out with being over the Welterweight championship but soon turned into a more personal storyline between the two. The storyline led to both masked men putting their mask on the line in a Luchas de Apuestas, or bet match. Dr. Cerebro won and forced Oro, Jr. to unmask and reveal his real name. He would later abandon the Oro, Jr. name all together and become known as Mike Segura. On December 13, 1998 Dr. Cerebro lost the Welterweight championship to Shiima Nobunaga. In early 1999 Dr. Cerebro traveled to Japan to compete in the Japanese Toryumon, teaming with Bombero Infernal for most of the matches as the two slowly developed into a regular tag team combination. Back in Mexico Dr. Cerebro competed in the 2000 Yamaha Cup, losing to Genki Horiguchi and Mike Segura in the first round of the tournament. The team of Dr. Cerebro and Bombero Infernal received a couple of opportunities to wrestle for the IWRG Intercontinental Tag Team Championship, but lost to the championship team of Fantasy and Star Boy. Following the Yahama Cup Dr. Cerebro began working mainly for IWRG and soon recaptured the Welterweight Championship, defeating Último Vampiro on June 29, 2000. He subsequently began a storyline feud against Ciclon Ramírez over the Welterweight Championship that had Bombero Infernal help his partner on more than one occasion. On June 15, 2000 the three were involved in a three-way Lucha de Apuestas match with Ramírez risking his mask while Dr. Cerebro and Bombero Infernal both risked their hair. The match ended with Ciclon Ramírez pinning Bombero Infernal, forcing him to have all his hair shaved off as a result of the loss. Ramírez followed up by winning the Welterweight Championship only two weeks later. The feud with Ciclon Ramírez soon segued into a feud between Dr. Cerebro and longtime rival Mike Segura. The storyline included Dr. Cerebro defeating both Ramírez and Segura in a match on August 13, 2000 to win the Welterweight Championship for the third time. He would later successfully defend the championship against Mike Segura. IWRG had a working relationship with Consejo Mundial de Lucha Libre (CMLL) that allowed CMLL wrestlers to work for IWRG as well, which brought El Hijo del Santo to IWRG and in direct conflict with Dr. Cerebro as the two clashed over the IWRG Welterweight Championship. The storyline between the two saw El Hijo del Santo win the mask of Dr. Cerebro as he won a Lucha de Apuesta match on December 21, 2000 forcing the Doctor to unmask and reveal his given name as per Lucha libre traditions. On January 10, 2002 Dr. Cerebro along with Paramedico and Cirujano defeated Los Megas (Mega, Super Mega and Ultra Mega) to win the Distrito Federal Trios Championship, making Dr. Cerebro a double champion in IWRG. Five months later Dr. Cerebro and Bombero Infernal won the IWRG Intercontinental Tag Team Championship when the champions Mega and Ultra Mega failed to appear, which meant that Dr. Cerebro held three different championships at one time.

In 2004 Dr. Cerebro began teaming with Cerebro Negro ("Black Brain"), a wrestler with a similar ring character to form Los Terrible Cerebros, who would win the IWRG Intercontinental Tag Team Championship on two separate occasions. In 2005 Los Terrible Cerebros would team up with Veneno to win the Distrito Federal Tris Championship and in 2007 the two, along with Mike Segura would win the IWRG Intercontinental Trios Championship. Los Terrible Cerebros would also win the hair of Los Gemelo Fantastico ("The Fantastic Twins") in a tag team Lucha de Apuesta match that took place on October 31, 2008. Later on Los Terrible Cerebros would be expanded with longtime wrestler Black Terry, a trio that would hold the Distrito Federal Trios Championship for 488 days straight, defending the championship on multiple occasions. During their run as the trios champions Dr. Cerebro and Cerebro Negro were forced to face off against each other in aLucha de Apuesta after both competitors lost a Steel Cage match, the match saw Dr. Cerebro defeat his partner, leaving Cerebro Negro bald. On January 10, 2010 Dr. Cerebro defeated Tetsuya Bushi to win the IWRG Intercontinental Lightweight Championship, a belt he would hold for over 100 days. In January, 2010 Dr. Cerebro teamed up with second-generation wrestler El Hijo del Signo to compete in the first ever Torneo Relampago de Proyeccion a Nuevas Promesas de la Lucha Libre (""Projecting a new promise lightning tournament") on January 1, 2010. The tournament would see a wrestling veteran team up with a rookie for a tag team competition designed to give more exposure to the rookies. The duo defeated Imperial and Rocket in the first round, Guizmo and Ultraman, Jr. in the second round and finally Comando Negro and Oficial 911 to win the while tournament. The following month Dr. Cerebro, El Hijo del Pantera and Trauma II were the last three survivors in a multi-man torneo cibernetico elimination match, winning the 2010 Copa Higher Poweer trophy. In April, 2010 the Mexico City wrestling Commission stripped Los Terrible Cerebros of the championship when Cerebro Negro temporarily stopped working for IWRG. They held a tournament to crown new champions which included the team of Black Terry, Dr. Cerebro and El Hijo del Signo, which was eliminated in the second round. On March 21, 2010 Dr. Cerebro put the IWRG Lightweight Championship on the line against El Hijo del Diablo's WWS World Welterweight Championship, adding the WWS World Welterweight Championship to his collection. On May 23, 2010 Dr. Cerebro defeated Fuerza Guerrera to win his fourth IWRG Weltwegith Championship, only to lose it 2 weeks later to CIMA. In late 2010 Dr. Cerebro began making occasional appearances for AAA, who worked together with IWRG to share wrestlers. On January 30, 2011 Comando Negro won the IWRG Intercontinental Lightweight Championship from Dr. Cerero as part of IWRG's annual Caravan de Campeones show. On March 5, 2011 Dr. Cerebro officially worked a match for Consejo Mundial de Lucha Libre (CMLL), participating in CMLL's card for the Festival Mundial de Lucha Libre (the "World Wrestling Festival") where he teamed up with Los Traumas only to lose to CMLL contracted wrestlers Puma King, Tiger Kid and Virus. Dr. Cerebro, Cerebro Negro and Eterno teamed up to participant in a tournament to crown the first ever AAA World Trios Champion, losing in the first round to Los Bizarros (Charly Manson, Cibernético and Billy el Malo). On June 2, 2011 Dr. Cerero lost the last of his championships as Multifacetico won the WWS Welterweight Championship from him during IWRG's 2011 Legado Final show. A few days later Dr. Cerebro participated in a tour of England, during which he participated in a tournament for the vacant NWA World Welterweight Championship, only to lose to Cassandro. In late 2012 Dr. Cerebro entered a tournament for the vacant WWS World Welterweight Championship, defeating Relampago and Carta Brava, Jr. in the preliminary rounds only to lose to Cerebro Negro in the finals. That match was only one of many matches in the escalating storyline between the two Cerebros, former partners turned enemies. A month later Dr. Cerebro defeated Cerebro Negro in a Lucha de Apuesta match, shaving his opponent's hair off after the match.

== Personal life ==
In addition to being a professional wrestler Jiménez is also a licensed Chiropractor and works almost full-time at a clinic in addition to wrestling. Several other wrestlers have been treated by Jiménez and he credits his training with keeping his body safe after so many years in the ring.

== Championships and accomplishments ==
- International Wrestling Revolution Group
  - IWRG Intercontinental Lightweight Championship (1 time)
  - IWRG Intercontinental Middleweight Championship (2 times, current)
  - IWRG Intercontinental Tag Team Championship (3 times) – with Bombero Infernal (1), Cerebro Negro (2)
  - IWRG Intercontinental Trios Championship (1 time) – with Cerebro Negro and Mike Segura
  - IWRG Intercontinental Welterweight Championship (4 times)
  - Distrito Federal Trios Championship (4 times) – with Cirujano and Paramedico (1), Cerebro Negro and Veneno (1) and Black Terry and Cerebro Negro (2)
  - WWS World Welterweight Championship (2 times)
  - Copa Higher Power (1997) – with Fantasy, Mr. Águila, Neblina and Tony Rivera
  - Copa Higher Power (2010) – with El Hijo del Pantera and Trauma II
  - Torneo Relampago de Proyeccion a Nuevas Promesas de la Lucha Libre (2010) with El Hijo del Signo
- Wrestling Martin Calderón
  - Campeón del Sur (1 time)

== Lucha de Apuesta record ==
Winner (wager)	Loser (wager)	Location	Event	Date	Notes
Dr. Cerebro (mask)	Oro, Jr. (mask)	Naucalpan, State of Mexico	IWRG Live event	July 26, 1998	
El Hijo del Santo (mask)	Dr. Cerebro (mask)	Naucalpan, State of Mexico	IWRG Live event	March 1, 2001	
Dr. Cerebro (hair)	Black Terry (hair)	Naucalpan, State of Mexico	IWRG Live event	March 9, 2003	
Dr. Cerebro (hair)	American Gigolo	Naucalpan, State of Mexico	IWRG Live event	December 9, 2004	
Masada (Hair)	Dr. Cerebro (hair)	Naucalpan, State of Mexico	IWRG Live event	December 19, 2004	
Dr. Cerebro (Hair)	Avisman (Hair)	Naucalpan, State of Mexico	IWRG Live event	May 12, 2005	
Dr. Cerebro (Hair)	Black Terry (Hair)	Naucalpan, State of Mexico	IWRG Live event	February 19, 2006	
Mike Segura (Hair)	Dr. Cerebro (Hair)	Naucalpan, State of Mexico	IWRG Live event	March 16, 2006	
Dr. Cerebro (Hair)	Black Terry (Hair)	Nezahualcóyotl, State of Mexico	House show	July 16, 2006	(Note: Lost a Relevos Suicidas match to Fabián el Gitano and Marco Rivera and were thus forced to wrestle each other.)
Cerebro Negro and Dr. Cerebro (Hairs)	Los Gemelo Fantasticos (Hairs)	Naucalpan, State of Mexico	IWRG Live event	October 31, 2008	
Dr. Cerebro (hair)	Cerebro Negro (Hair)	Naucalpan, State of Mexico	IWRG Live event	January 1, 2009	(Note: Both lost a Steel Cage match to be forced into this match.)
Dr. Cerebro (hair)	Freelance (Hair)	Naucalpan, State of Mexico	IWRG Live event	February 19, 2009	
Juventud Guerrera (Hair)	Dr. Cerebro (Hair)	Naucalpan, State of Mexico	IWRG Live event	July 2, 2009	
Mike Segura (hair)	Dr. Cerebro (hair)	Naucalpan, State of Mexico	IWRG Live event	November 15, 2009	
Magnífico (hair)	Dr. Cerebro (hair)	Coacalco de Berriozábal, State of Mexico	House show	October 16, 2011	
Super Nova and Neza Kid (masks)	Dr. Cerebro and Vampiro Metálico (hairs)	Nezahualcóyotl, Mexico State	House show	January 1, 2012	
Dr. Cerebro (hair)	Cerebro Negro (hair)	Naucalpan, State of Mexico	IWRG Live event	December 16, 2012	
Dr. Cerebro (hair)	X-Fly (hair)	Naucalpan, State of Mexico	IWRG Live event	June 23, 2013	
Dr. Cerebro (hair)	Apolo Estrada Jr. (hair)	Naucalpan, State of Mexico	IWRG Live event	December 15, 2013	
El Brazo Jr. (mask)	Dr. Cerebro (title)	Mexico City	Live event	August 29, 2015	
Los Insoportables (Hair) (Eterno and Apolo Estrada Jr.)	Los Terribles Cerebros (Hair) (Black Terry and Dr. Cerebro)	Naucalpan, State of Mexico	Arena Naucalpan 38th Anniversary Show	December 20, 2015	
Dr. Cerebro (hair)	Astro (mask)	Naucalpan, State of Mexico	Guerra del Golfo	April 17, 2016	(Note: Both wrestlers lost a steel cage match earlier in the night to be forced to fight each other.)
Ricky Marvin (hair)	Dr. Cerebro (hair)	Naucalpan, State of Mexico	Cabellera vs. Cabellera	March 25, 2018	
Francois Montañez (mask)	Dr. Cerebro	Naucalpan, State of Mexico	Guerra de Dinastías	January 31, 2019	
Cerebro Negro and Dr. Cerebro (hair)	Los Diabólicos (hair) (El Gallego and Romano García)	Nezahualcoyotl, Mexico State	Liga de la Justicia IV Aniversario	December 25, 2019	
