= Imposible (wrestler) =

Mexican masked professional wrestler

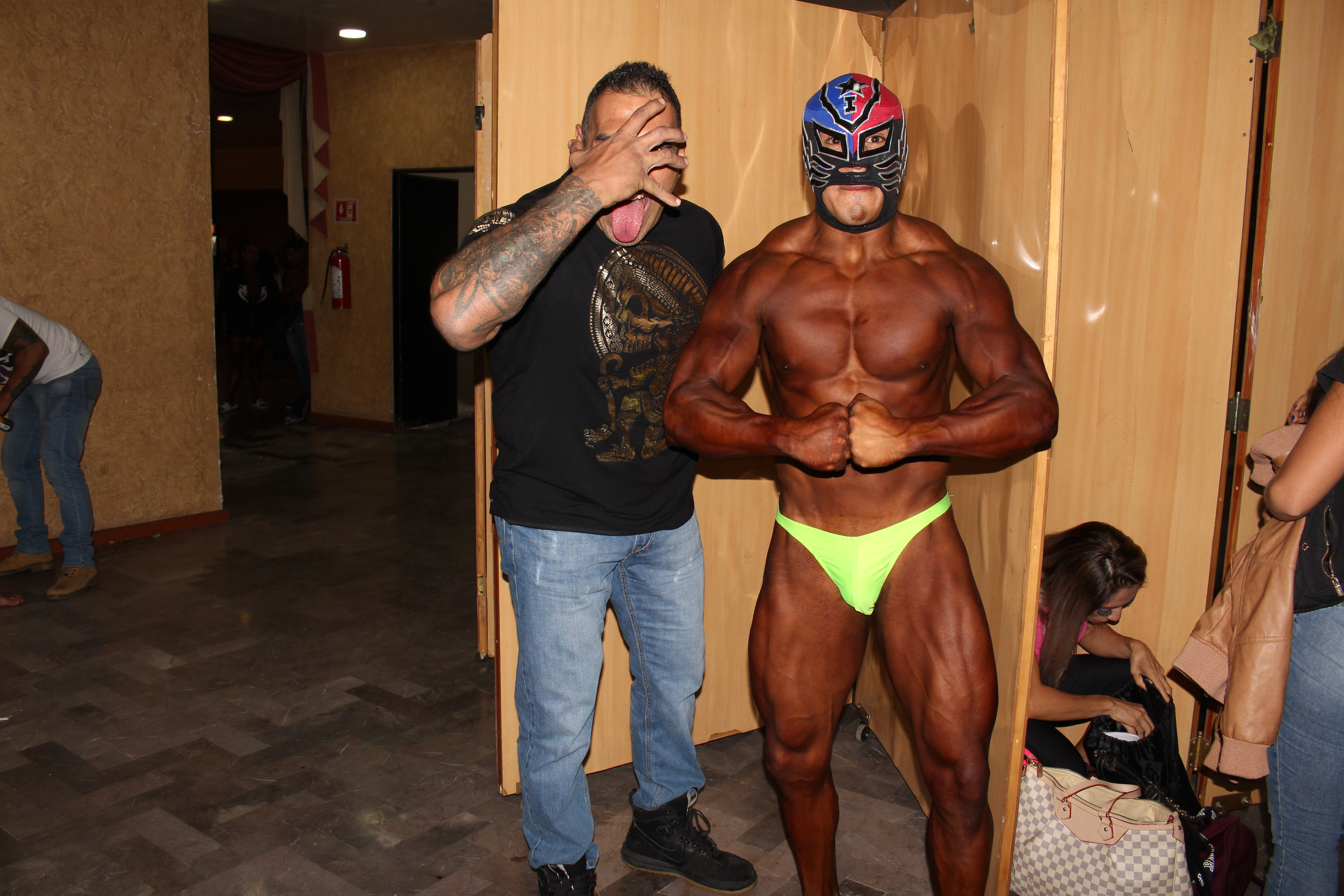
- Imposible (masked) in 2018

Personal information
- Born: Unrevealed; July 19 State of Mexico, Mexico

Professional wrestling career
- Ring names: Imposible; Fuerza Guerrera Nueva Generación; Fuerza Guerrera NG
- Billed height: 1.73 m (5 ft 8 in)
- Billed weight: 80 kg (176 lb)
- Trained by: Negro Navarro; Trauma I; Trauma II; Fuerza Guerrera
- Debut: 2008

Imposible is a Mexican professional wrestler, who currently works for promotion International Wrestling Revolution Group (IWRG). He has also worked under the ring name Fuerza Guerrera Nueva Generación (or Fuerza Guerrera NG). He is not related to Fuerza Guerrera, but was officially allowed to use the name by his trainer. His real name is not a matter of public record, as is often the case with masked wrestlers in Mexico where their private lives are kept a secret from the wrestling fans.

Imposible was trained for his professional wrestling career by Negro Navarro. He is a two time holder of the IWRG Intercontinental Middleweight Championship, previously held the IWRG Intercontinental Lightweight Championship and the IWRG Intercontinental Tag Team Championship with Aramís. For years, he was part of Los Mariachis Locos with El Hijo del Diablo and El Diablo Jr., with whom he won the Distrito Federal Trios Championship twice. He won the 2012 version of the El Protector tag team tournament with X-Fly and the 2017 Rey del Ring tournament and championship.

== Professional wrestling career ==
In Mexico, there is a long-standing tradition of keeping the personal information of masked wrestlers private from the general public unless they at some point are forced to unmask in the ring. This secrecy extends to wrestling promotions not revealing a wrestler's real name and news outlets not asking for personal details in interviews. Because of this tradition, the real name of the wrestler known under the ring names Imposible is not common knowledge.

=== International Wrestling Revolution Group (2010–present) ===
The wrestler known as Imposible made his debut under that ring name in 2010 as part of trainee shows for the International Wrestling Revolution Group (IWRG) Training School, but it is possible he made his debut prior to that under an undisclosed ring name. His ring character was that of a masked Jamaican. He appeared on his first major IWRG show on January 13, 2011, IWRG's first annual Proyeccion a Nuevas Promesas ("Projecting a new promise"). For the opening match of the show he teamed up with Epidemia to defeat Heros and Mascarita de Oro. The following year the tournament was renamed El Protector, in which Imposible participated. The tournament format was to team up a novato ("rookie") with a veteran wrestler for a tag team tournament. Imposible was teamed up with veteran X-Fly and in the first round they defeated the team of Eterno and Apolo Estrada Jr., in the second round they defeated Saruman and Veneno, and in the finals they defeated Centvrión and Negro Navarro to win the 2012 tournament. In early 2012, Imposible changed his ring character to that of a caveman, but kept the name the same. In the summer of 2012, Imposible was one of six wrestlers competing for the vacant IWRG Intercontinental Lightweight Championship, which he ended up winning on July 1 as he eliminated Astro Rey Jr. and Dragon Celestial to become the 12th overall Lightweight Champion. Later in the year, he would revert to his original Jamaican ring character with no real explanation for the changes. In 2014, Imposible was involved in a storyline feud with El Hijo de la Bestia ("The Son of the Beast"), a storyline that led to both wrestlers putting their mask on the line in a Lucha de Apuestas (or "bet match"). Imposible won and forced his opponent to unmask as per lucha libre rules. In late 2014, Imposible teamed up with Chicano to compete for the vacant IWRG Intercontinental Tag Team Championship, defeating the team of El Hijo del Diablo and Apolo Estrada Jr. in the first round, before losing to the team of Canis Lupus and Eterno in the finals of the tournament. On May 1, 2016, Los Mariachis Locos lost the Distrito Federal Trios Championship to Los Tortugas Ninja ("The Ninja Turtles"; Leo, Mike and Rafy). In August 2016, Imposible announced that he was giving up the lightweight championship as he felt he needed to move up into the middleweight division and challenge for the IWRG Intercontinental Middleweight Championship. On January 22, 2017, Imposible lost the middleweight championship to Relámpago, after which an angry Imposible made a Lucha de Apuestas challenge.

== Championships and accomplishments ==
- International Wrestling Revolution Group
  - Distrito Federal Trios Championship (2 times) – with Hijo del Diablo and, Diablo I Jr. (Note: The title is sanctioned by the Mexico City wrestling commission but promoted by IWRG.)
  - IWRG Intercontinental Lightweight Championship (1 time)
  - IWRG Intercontinental Middleweight Championship (2 times)
  - IWRG Intercontinental Tag Team Championship (1 time) – with Aramís
  - IWRG Rey del Ring 2017
  - IWRG El Protector: 2012 – with X-Fly
- Esto Es Lucha-Pro Wrestling
  - Copa Tony Sugar – with Carta Brava Jr.

== Lucha de Apuesta record ==
Winner (wager)	Loser (wager)	Location	Event	Date	Notes
Imposible (mask)	El Hijo de la Bestia (mask)	Naucalpan, State of Mexico	Live event	May 21, 2014	
Imposible (mask)	Pirata Morgan Jr. (mask)	Naucalpan, State of Mexico	Prisión Fatal	January 1, 2017	(Note: This was a four-man Steel Cage match that also included Golden Magic and Relámpago)
Imposible (Championship)	Apolo Estrada Jr. (Hair)	Naucalpan, State of Mexico	IWRG Show	January 15, 2017	(Note: This was a three-way match that also included Relámpago)
