= Black Terry =

Mexican professional wrestler (1952–2025)

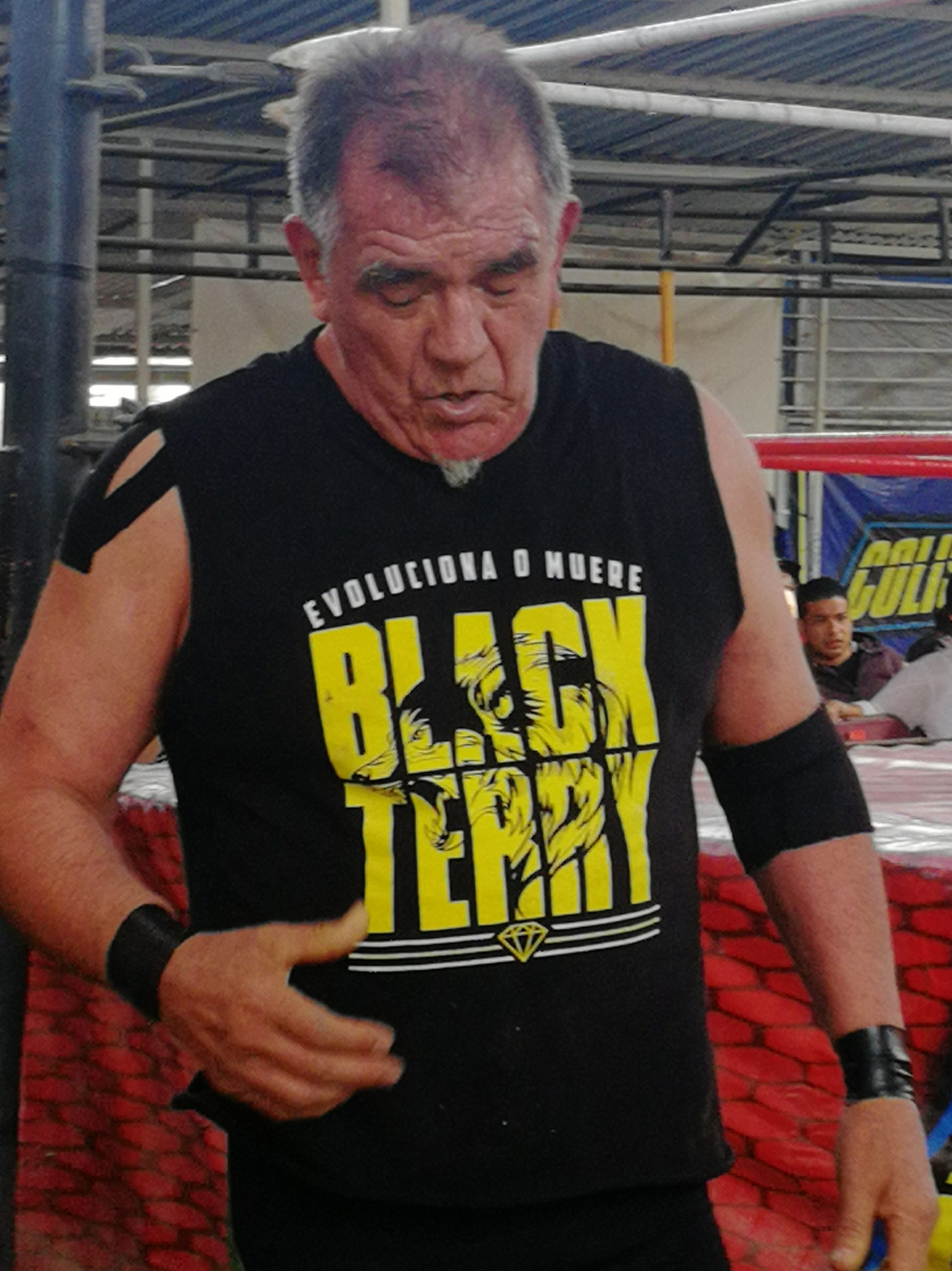

Personal information
- Born: Esteban Mares Castañeda; September 3, 1952 Guadalajara, Jalisco, Mexico
- Died: April 20, 2025 (aged 72) Mexico City, Mexico

Professional wrestling career
- Ring name(s): Black Terry; La Gacela; El Hijo del Diablo; Guerrero Maya
- Billed height: 1.67 m (5 ft 5 1/2 in)
- Billed weight: 80 kg (176 lb)
- Trained by: Luis Canales; Babe Face; Chato Quesada
- Debut: February 1973

Esteban Mares Castañeda (September 3, 1952 – April 20, 2025) was a Mexican professional wrestler, better known by the ring name Black Terry. Wrestling since 1973, he was once part of a group called Los Temerarios alongside Jose Luis Feliciano and Shu El Guerrero. He had also worked as the masked character Guerrero Maya ("Mayan Warrior") where he formed the group called Los Guerreros Del Futuro ("The Warriors of the Future") with Guerrero del Futuro (a masked Feliciano) and Damian El Guerrero. He was the mentor & kayfabe father of wrestler Guerrero Maya Jr. although the relationship was not officially recognized due to Guerrero Maya, Jr. being a masked wrestler.

== Professional wrestling career ==
Mares made his professional wrestling debut in February 1973, using the ring name Black Terry but later adopted a masked ring character called "La Gacela", Spanish for "The Gazelle". On November 20, 1977, Mares was forced to remove the La Gacela mask after losing a Lucha de Apuesta ("Bet match") to El Signo. Following the mask loss he reverted to working as Black Terry.

=== Los Temerarios ===
As Black Terry he became a main stay of the Universal Wrestling Association's lighter divisions, especially the Lightweight division where he won the UWA World Lightweight Championship from Black Man on September 30, 1981. While he was known mainly for being a technical wrestler during his early years Black Terry displayed a much rougher, violent style once he joined together with Shu El Guerrero and Jose Luis Feliciano to form Los Temerarios ("The Fearless") in the early 1980s. After 823 days as champion Black Terry lost the UWA World Lightweight Championship to Negro Casas on January 1, 1984. One of Los Temerarios initial opponents was a popular team called Los Cadetos del Espacio ("The Space Cadets") consisting of El Solar, Super Astro, and Ultraman, with whom Los Temerarios had a series of matches, including a Luchas de Apuestas match between the two teams that left all three Temerarios without their hair. The early 1980s was the boom for trios wrestling matches in Mexico, especially with the success of Los Misioneros de la Muerte (El Signo, El Texano, and Negro Navarro), and Los Temerarios built on that success with a number very well received trios matches. The three were so successful they became the first holders of the Distrito Federal Trios Championship, a title that was sanctioned not by a wrestling promotion but by the Mexico City wrestling and Boxing commission and was not technically owned by one single promotion. Los Temerarios would later lose the Distrito Federal Trios Championship to a trio of young Japanese wrestlers, Yoshihiro Asai, Hata Hirokazu, and Naoki Sano, at a show in Naucalpan, State of Mexico. On November 20, 1989, Los Temerarios won the Mexican National Trios Championship, which at the time was the most respected Trios championship in Mexico, when they defeated Los Destructores (Tony Arce, Emilio Charles, Jr., and Vulcano). Their run with the title lasted until January 1, 1991, when they lost the championship to Los Arqueros del Espacio ("The Space Archers"; El Arquero, Danny Boy, and Lasser). The title loss was part of a long running storyline between the two teams, a storyline that later saw Los Temerarios defeat Los Arqueros del Espacio, in this case Robin Hood, Danny Boy, and Lasser, in a Luchas de Apuetas match. By the end of 1991 Black Terry and Jose Luis Feliciano both began working for Consejo Mundial de Lucha Libre (CMLL), ending Los Temerarios.

=== Los Guerreros del Futuro ===
In CMLL Mares and Feliciano were both given new ring identities, including new masks to give them a fresh image. Terry became known as "Guerrero Maya" ("The Mayan Warrior") and Feliciano became known as "Guerrero del Futuro" ("The Warrior from the Future"). The two, together with Damian El Guerrero became known as Los Guerreros del Futuro and started a storyline with CMLL's top fan favorite trio at the time, Los Metálicos (Oro, Plata, and Bronce). Los Guerreros del Futuro won the Distrito Federal Trios Championship, but since CMLL did not publicly acknowledge that Guerrero Maya was previously Black Terry they were never presented as two-time champions. It is not clear exactly when or how Los Guerreros del Futuro lost the Distrito Federal titles, mainly due to lack of record keeping, but by 1995 the team of Ciclón Ramírez, El Nuevo Huracán Ramírez, Jr. and El Hijo de Huracán Ramírez were the Distrito Federal Trios Champions. As Guerrero Maya he also competed in a number of singles matches, including a tournament for the newly created CMLL World Middleweight Championship, a tournament won by Blue Panther. Los Guerreros del Futuro participated in CMLL's Salvador Lutteroth Trios Tournament in honor of CMLL founder Salvador Lutteroth. The tournament took place on March 24, 1995, and the trio lost in the first round to Los Brazos (Brazo de Oro, Brazo de Platba, and El Brazo) By late 1996 Los Guerreros del Futuro had disbanded and Mares left CMLL. For a while he worked as under the ring name El Hijo del Diablo ("The Son of the Devil"), a character that was later given to someone else.

=== International Wrestling Revolution Group ===
In the late 1990s and early 2000s Black Terry became associated with International Wrestling Revolution Group (IWRG), a regional promotion in Naucalpan, Mexico State. He became the head trainer at IWRG's training school and as such had a hand in training many of IWRG's and wrestlings future main eventers. One of the wrestlers trained by Black Terry became known as Multifacético ("Multi-faceted") and was later "revealed" to be Black Terry's son (currently known as Guerrero Maya Jr. in CMLL). As Multifacético Terry's son worked as a tecnico (the Spanish term for a wrestler who portrays a "good guy" character) and had a lot of promotional support behind him. The heavy focus on the inexperienced, and at times accident prone Multifacético saw the fans react in the opposite way, booing him instead of supporting him. With time his in-ring skills improved and his long-running feud with Black Terry eventually showed that he had wrestling skills and the two put on some of the best IWRG matches in 2008 according to SuperLuchas Magazine. During the storyline between the two Multifacético defeated Black Terry to win the IWRG Intercontinental Welterweight Championship. As part of his promotional push as a top star, Multifacético defeated Black Terry in a Lucha de Apuesta on April 7, 2008, leaving his father bald as a result. Black Terry later won the IWRG Welterweight Championship from Fuerza Guerrera. In early 2009 Multifacético left IWRG and became Guerrero Maya, Jr. in CMLL, finally "confirming" that he was indeed Black Terry's son.

IWRG held their first Torneo Relampago de Proyeccion a Nuevas Promesas de la Lucha Libre ("Projecting a new promise lightning tournament") on January 1, 2010. The tournament saw a wrestling veteran team up with a rookie for a tag team competition designed to give more exposure to the rookies. Black Terry teamed up with his trainee Alan Extreme, but lost in the first round to Dinamic Black (rookie) and Chico Che. Later that year Black Terry joined forces with Cerebro Negro and Dr. Cerebro to form Los Terribles Cerebros, a trio that defeated Los Oficiales (Oficial 911, Oficial AK-47, and Oficial Fierro) to win the Distrito Federal Trios Championship on December 7, 2010. Four months later the Mexico City wrestling Commission stripped Los Terrible Cerebros of the championship when Cerebro Negro temporarily stopped working for IWRG. They held a tournament to crown new champions which included the team of Black Terry, Dr. Cerebro, and El Hijo del Signo, which was eliminated in the second round. IWRG held another Proyeccion a Nuevas Promesas in 2011, which saw Black Terry team up with Kershin Black, defeating Muerte Infernal and El Hijo del Diablo but lost to the new Multifacético and Trauma I in the second round. In 2011 Black Terry unveiled Los Nuevo Temerarios consisting of himself, Durok and Machin, a group that did not last long before being replaced by Bombero Infernal and Alan Extreme. In 2012 IWRG renamed their "Rookie and Veteran" tournament to El Protector, where Black Terry once again teamed up with Alan Extreme, losing in the first round to Saurman and Veneno.

=== CMLL Arena Coliseo Tag Team Championship ===
On December 25, 2016, Negro Navarro and Black Terry, two independent wrestlers who did not work for CMLL, defeated the team of Guerrero Maya Jr. and The Panther for the CMLL Arena Coliseo Tag Team Championship. The match took place at the Lucha Memes show "Chairo 7: Hell In a Christmas Cell", a non-CMLL show. On February 19, 2017, Navarro and Black Terry made their first successful defense against CMLL wrestlers Sanson and Cuatrero at a Lucha Memes show. On March 26, 2017, Navarro and Black Terry made their second successful defense against CMLL wrestlers Hechicero and Virus at a Lucha Memes show. On April 12, 2017, Navarro and Black Terry made their third successful defense against CMLL wrestlers Blue Panther and The Panther at a CMLL show.

== Death ==
Black Terry died from cardiac arrest in Mexico City, on April 20, 2025, at the age of 72.

== Championships and accomplishments ==
- Consejo Mundial de Lucha Libre
  - CMLL Arena Coliseo Tag Team Championship (1 time) – with Negro Navarro
  - Distrito Federal Trios Championship (1 time) – with Guerrero del Futuro and Damian El Guerrero (Note: The title is sanctioned by the Mexico City wrestling commission but was promoted by CMLL at that point in time.)
- International Wrestling Revolution Group
  - IWRG Intercontinental Welterweight Championship (3 times)
  - IWRG Intercontinental Tag Team Championship (1 time) – with El Diablo Jr. I
  - Distrito Federal Trios Championship (2 times) – with Dr. Cerebro and Cerebro Negro
- Mexican local promotions
  - Jalisco Welterweight Championship (1 time)
  - Naucalpan Tag Team Championship (1 time) – with Blue Panther
  - Naucalpan Trios Championship (1 time) – Shu el Guerrero and José Luis Feliciano
  - Naucalpan Welterweight Championship (1 time)
- Universal Wrestling Association
  - UWA World Lightweight Championship (1 time)
  - Mexican National Trios Championship (1 time) – with Guerrero del Futuro and Shu El Guerrero (Note: The title is sanctioned by the Mexico City wrestling commission but was promoted by the UWA at that point in time.)
  - Distrito Federal Trios Championship (1 time) – with Jose Luis Feliciano and Shu El Guerrero

== Luchas de Apuestas record ==
Winner (wager)	Loser (wager)	Location	Event	Date	Notes
Black Terry and Águila Roja (hair)	El Argentino and Chucho García (hair)	Guadalajara, Jalisco	Live event	February 8, 1976	
El Signo (hair)	La Gacela (mask)	N/A	Live event	November 20, 1977	
Black Terry (hair)	Mando Amezcua (hair)	Mexico City	Live event	September 22, 1983	
Los Cadetos del Espacio (masks) (El Solar, Super Astro and Ultraman)	Los Temerarios (hair) (Black Terry, Jose Luis Feliciano and Lobo Rubio)	Naucalpan, State of Mexico	Live event	July 8, 1984	
Los Temerarios (hair) (Black Terry and Jose Luis Feliciano)	Bello Greco and Sergio El Hermoso (hair)	N/A	UWA Live event	April 23, 1986	
El Hijo del Santo (mask)	Black Terry (hair)	Iraputo, Guanajuato	Live event	March 9, 1987	
Asai (hair)	Black Terry (hair)	Naucalpan, State of Mexico	Live event	July 6, 1988	
Lasser (hair)	Black Terry (hair)	Naucalpan, State of Mexico	Live event	December 17, 1989	
Los Temerarios (hair) (Black Terry, Jose Luis Feliciano and Shu el Guerrero)	Los Arqueros del Espacio (hair) (Robin Hood, Danny Boy and Lasser)	N/A	Live event	N/A	
Black Man (mask)	Black Terry (hair)	Querétaro, Querétaro	Live event	October 30, 1990	
Guerrero Maya (mask)	Mr. Power (mask)	Guadalajara, Jalisco	Live event	2002	
Black Terry (hair)	Sexy Boy (hair)	Tlalnepantla, State of Mexico	Live event	November 1, 2002	
Dr. Cerebro (hair)	Black Terry (hair)	Naucalpan, State of Mexico	Live event	March 9, 2003	
Avisman (hair)	Black Terry (hair)	Naucalpan, State of Mexico	Live event	September 16, 2003	
Rocky Santana (hair)	Black Terry (hair)	Mexico City	Live event	April 1, 2004	
Black Terry (hair)	El Monstruo I (hair)	N/A	Live event	August 29, 2004	
Rocky Santana (hair)	Black Terry (hair)	Tlalnepantla, State of Mexico	Live event	December 2, 2004	
Rocky Santana (hair)	Black Terry (hair)	Tlalnepantla, State of Mexico	Live event	August 6, 2005	
Dr. Cerebro (hair)	Black Terry (hair)	Naucalpan, State of Mexico	Live event	February 19, 2006	
Dr. Cerebro (hair)	Black Terry (hair)	Nezahualcoyotl, State of Mexico	Live event	July 16, 2006	(Note: The two lost a Relevos Suicidas match to Fabian El Gitano and Marco Rivera and were forced to wrestle each other.)
Terry 2000 (hair)	Black Terry (hair)	Tlalnepantla, State of Mexico	Live event	November 1, 2006	(Note: >Last two men in a Steel cage match and also included Villano III, Rocky Santana, Ultimo Gladiador, Damian 666, Halloween, Mr. Águila, Sadico and Rey Krimen.)
Cerebro Negro (hair)	Black Terry (hair)	Naucalpan, State of Mexico	Live event	March 11, 2007	
Black Terry (hair)	Cerebro Negro (hair)	Naucalpan, State of Mexico	Live event	November 22, 2007	
Multifacético (hair)	Black Terry (hair)	Naucalpan, State of Mexico	Live event	April 17, 2008	
Fuerza Guerrera (Championship)	Black Terry (hair)	Naucalpan, State of Mexico	Live event	November 16, 2008	(Note: Fuerza Guerrero put the IWRG Intercontinental Welterweight Championship on the line against Black Terry's hair.)
Chico Che (hair)	Black Terry (hair)	Naucalpan, State of Mexico	Live event	August 16, 2009	(Note: Last two wrestlers in a Steel cage match that also included Oficial AK-47, Arlequin Amarillo, Fantasma de la Opera, Jack, Máscara Año 2000, Jr., Ricky Cruzz, Bushi and Trauma I)
Hijo del Diablo (hair)	Black Terry (hair)	Naucalpan, State of Mexico	Live event	February 7, 2010	(Note: Last two men in a steel cage match that also included Gringo Loco and Dr. Cerebro)
Black Terry (hair)	Bombero Infernal (hair)	Naucalpan, State of Mexico	Live event	June 24, 2010	(Note: "Captains Hair" match, Black Terry, Cerebro Negro and Dr. Cerebro vs. Bombero Infernal, Maldito Jr. and Samot, where the losing captain would be shaved bald.)
Black Terry (hair)	El Gallego (hair)	Naucalpan, State of Mexico	Live event	December 21, 2010	
Angel Mortal (hair)	Black Terry (hair)	Naucalpan, State of Mexico	Live event	January 23, 2011	
Chico Che (hair)	Black Terry (hair)	Naucalpan, State of Mexico	Live event	January 29, 2012	
Black Terry (hair)	Tony Rivera (hair)	Naucalpan, State of Mexico	Live event	April 6, 2014	
Los Insoportables (Hair) (Eterno and Apolo Estrada Jr.)	Los Terribles Cerebros (Hair) (Black Terry and Dr. Cerebro)	Naucalpan, State of Mexico	Arena Naucalpan 38th Anniversary Show	December 20, 2015	
Black Terry (hair)	Judas el Traidor (hair)	Naucalpan, State of Mexico	Cabellera vs. Cabellera	August 17, 2016	
El Hijo del Diablo (hair)	Black Terry (hair)	Naucalpan, State of Mexico	IWRG event	October 23, 2016	
