= Trauma I =

Mexican professional wrestler

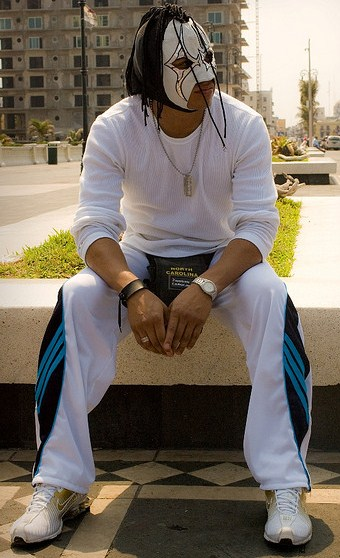
- Trauma I, wearing his mask while in public

Personal information
- Born: Unrevealed; March 27, 1985 (age 41) Mexico City, Mexico

Professional wrestling career
- Ring name: Trauma I
- Billed height: 1.77 m (5 ft 9 1/2 in)
- Billed weight: 80 kg (176 lb)
- Trained by: Negro Navarro
- Debut: March 25, 2002

Trauma I (born March 27, 1985) is a Mexican professional wrestler, working on the Mexican independent circuit and as a freelance wrestler for promotions such as International Wrestling Revolution Group (IWRG), portraying a tecnico ("Good guy") wrestling character. Trauma I's real name is not a matter of public record, as is often the case with masked wrestlers in Mexico where their private lives are kept a secret from the wrestling fans. Trauma I is a second-generation wrestler, the son of Miguel Calderón Navarro, better known under his ring name Negro Navarro. He is the younger brother of Trauma II, who he regularly teams up with under the name Los Traumas. Trauma I is a freelance wrestler and thus is not exclusively working for one specific professional wrestling promotion but has worked for many Mexican wrestling promotions including working matches on shows promoted by the largest Mexican based promotions such as Lucha Libre AAA Worldwide (AAA), Consejo Mundial de Lucha Libre (CMLL), and International Wrestling Revolution Group (IWRG).

== Personal life ==
Trauma I is a second-generation wrestler, the son of Miguel Calderón Navarro, better known under his ring name Negro Navarro. He is the younger brother of Trauma II, who he teams with under the name Los Traumas. He is the nephew of wrestlers Apolo Navarro and Drako. Both Traumas were trained for their professional career by their father, supporting them in wanting to become professional wrestlers and also helping them gain connections to promoters and make a name for themselves instead of wrestling as "Negro Navarro, Jr." or variations there off. While Navarro began his career without wearing a mask his sons both opted to start out as masked wrestlers, keeping their birth names a secret from the general public.

== Professional wrestling career ==
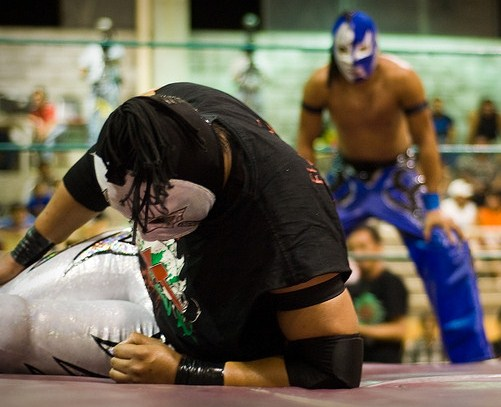
Trauma I, facing off against his brother Trauma II

In Mexico, it is traditional to keep the true identify of a masked professional wrestler a secret, not revealing their real names and oftentimes not revealing what previous ring names they have competed under. While Trauma I is listed as having made his professional wrestling debut in 2002 it has not been confirmed if Trauma I worked under a previous masked identity to gain experience before making it public that he was the son of Negro Navarro. His older brother made his professional wrestling debut only a few months later, adopting the ring name "Trauma II" as the brothers formed a regular tag team known as Los Traumas or Los Hermano Trauma ("The Trauma Brothers") who competed in and around Mexico City on the Mexican independent circuit, including working regularly for the Desastre Total Ultraviolento (DTU) and NWA Mexico professional wrestling promotions. The team often appeared on the same shows as their father, who also worked as a Freelance wrestler on the independent circuit. Around 2007 Trauma I began making appearances for International Wrestling Revolution Group (IWRG) and would become a regular in the years that followed. On March 22, 2009, Trauma I was one of 14 men that risked either their mask or their hair on the outcome of a steel cage match where the last person in the cage would be forced to unmask or have his hair shave off. Trauma I survived the match with his mask as Cerebro Negro was the last man in the cage and thus had his hair shaved off. 2009 marked the year that Trauma I began to regularly appear at IWRG's signature events, including participating in the 2009 Rey del Ring ("King of the Ring"), an event won by Ricky Cruzz. On August 16 of the same year Trauma I once again risked his mask in a Steel Cage match; this time he was one of ten people involved in the match. The match ended with Black Terry being shaved bald as a result of losing the match. He also survived IWRG's annual Castillo del Terror ("Castle of Terror") that saw Yack unmasked after losing the match. While he worked more and more for IWRG in 2009 most of the major matches did not include his brother Trauma II, in fact he began teaming with his father under the name La Dinastia de la Muerte ("The Dynasty of Death"), which in 2010 led to La Dinastia defeating the teams of El Canek and El Hijo del Canek, Pantera and El Hijo del Pantera, Mike Segura and Olímpico in a tournament to determine the new IWRG Intercontinental Tag Team Champions. The team lost in the finals to Los Piratas (Pirata Morgan and El Hijo de Pirata Morgan), but started a storyline feud with the father/son team. After being involved in a number of matches with Luchas de Apuestas, or "Bet match", rules Trauma I finally an Apuesta match on February 25, 2010, when he captained the team of himself, Dr. Cerebro and El Hijo del Signo against a team captained by Pantera that also include El Hijo del Pantera and Zatura. Under the rules of the match the team captain of the losing team, Pantera, was shaved bald as a result of the match. On March 11, 2010, Trauma I won his first singles championship, when he defeated Angélico to win the Americas Light Heavyweight Championship, one of many titles that floated around on the Mexican Independent circuit.

Trauma I also worked a number of Toryumon Mexico shows, giving him the opportunity to work with and against a number of wrestlers from Consejo Mundial de Lucha Libre (CMLL), Mexico's largest and the world's oldest wrestling promotion including a match against one of CMLL's top teams, Los Guerreros del Infierno (Rey Bucanero and Último Guerrero) as part of the 2010 Yamaha Cup tournament. On December 17, 2010, Trauma I and Angélico qualified for the finals of the 2010 Young Dragons Cup by outlasting Astro Boy, Daisuke Hanaoka, Demus 3:16, Histeria, Jr., Robin and Ulises, Jr. In the finals Angélico won both the match and the tournament. Trauma I teamed up with Multifacetico to participate in the 2011 Torneo Relampago de Proyeccion a Nuevas Promesas de la Lucha Libre (Spanish for "Projecting a new promise lightning tournament"). The team defeated Alan Extreme and Chico Che in the first round and the team of Black Terry and Keshin Black in the second round, but lost the finals to Comando Negro and Scorpio, Jr. He also participated in the tournament to crown the first ever IWRG Junior de Junior Champion, but was eliminated in the semi-final round. On March 5, 2011, Los Traumas officially worked a match for CMLL, participating in CMLL's card for the Festival Mundial de Lucha Libre (the "World Wrestling Festival") where they teamed up with Dr. Cerebro only to lose to CMLL contracted wrestlers Puma King, Tiger Kid and Virus. On March 27, 2011, less than two months after losing the tournament, Trauma I defeated Hijo del Pirata Morgan to win the IWRG Junior de Juniors Championship at the 2011 Rebelión de los Juniors show. On May 15, Los Traumas defeated Los Compadres (Chucho el Roto and Iron Love) to win the AULL Tag Team Championship, the first major championship the brothers won as a duo. On December 22, as part of IWRG's celebration of the Arena Naucalpan 34th Anniversary, Los Traumas found themselves on opposite sides of a Relevos Suicidas match, where the two members of the losing team would be forced to wrestle under Luchas de Apuestas rules. Trauma I teamed up with Oficial AK-47 as they lost to Trauma II and Oficial 911. In the subsequent Luchas de Apuestas match Trauma I defeated AK-47, forcing him to unmask as per lucha libre traditions. On March 18, 2012, Trauma I became a double IWRG champion when he and Negro Navarro defeated Los Piratas to win the IWRG Intercontinental Tag Team Championship. Trauma I's reign as the IWRG Junior de Juniors Champion came to an end on March 22, 2012, as he was defeated by Bestia 666. On April 14, 2012, Los Traumas lost the AULL Tag Team Championship to Los Bastardos (Epitafio and Leviathan) on an AULL show in Tlalnepantla de Baz, State of Mexico. In September 2012 Trauma I teamed up with IWRG wrestlers Cien Caras, Jr. and Hijo de Máscara Año 2000 to work a match on a Lucha Libre AAA Worldwide (AAA) show, marking the first time the team worked directly for AAA. Both Traumas were part of the 2012 El Castillo del Terror steel cage match, primarily through their developing rivalry with El Ángel. Both brothers escaped the cage without losing their mask. On November 18, Trauma I and Hijo del Pirata Morgan qualified for the finals of a tournament where the winner would get a match for the Rey del Ring tournament. The two outlasted Oficial AK-47, Cien Caras, Jr., Freeyser, Hijo de Máscara Año 2000, Relámpago and Veneno. Hijo de Pirata Morgan won the tournament and the right to face Rey del Ring Champion Factor at a later date. On August 11, Trauma I and Navarro lost the IWRG Intercontinental Tag Team Championship to La Familia de Tijuana (Eterno and X-Fly). He won the title again with Trauma II on September 1, 2013. On August 9, 2015 Las Traumas and Negro Navarro won the IWRG Intercontinental Trios Championship from Los Piratas (Pirata Mogan, Pirata Morgan Jr. and Hijo del Pirata Mogan). On February 14, 2016, Trauma I defeated Hijo de Dos Caras and Herodes Jr. in a three-way match to win the IWRG Intercontinental Heavyweight Championship.

== In other media ==
The Trauma brothers have designed and sell their own line of T-shirts and sweatshirts manufactured by SidZero. The line of clothes was inspired by their ring looks and have been described as having the aesthetics of Slipknot combined with zombie movie posters. In 2012 the World Press Photo organization, based in Amsterdam, the Netherlands selected photographs of Los Traumas taken by polish photographer Tomasz Gudzowaty as the third-place winner in their sports category. The images were taken on June 15, 2011, before and during a wrestling event in Mexico City and featured black and white photos of Los Traumas wearing their trademark "horror-inspired" masks.

== Championships and accomplishments ==
- Alianza Universal de Lucha Libre
  - AULL Tag Team Championship (1 time) – with Trauma II
- International Wrestling Revolution Group
  - IWRG Intercontinental Heavyweight Championship (2 times)
  - IWRG Intercontinental Tag Team Championship (2 times) – with Negro Navarro (1) and Trauma II (1)
  - IWRG Intercontinental Trios Championship (1 time) – with Negro Navarro and Trauma II
  - IWRG Junior de Juniors Championship (1 time)
- Mexican Independent Circuit
  - Americas Light Heavyweight Championship (1 time)
- The Crash Lucha Libre

- The Crash Tag Team Championship (1 time) – with Trauma II

== Lucha de Apuesta record ==
| Winner (wager) | Loser (wager) | Location | Event | Date | Notes |
|---|---|---|---|---|---|
| Trauma I (mask) | El Pantera (hair) | Naucalpan, Mexico State | IWRG show | February 25, 2010 | (Note: Trauma I and Pantera were randomly chosen as captains for opposing trios, Trauma I teamed with Dr. Cebrebro and Hijo del Signo, Pantera teamed with El Hijo del Pantera and Zatura.) |
| Trauma I (mask) | Oficial AK-47 (mask) | Naucalpan, Mexico State | IWRG show | December 22, 2011 | (Note: Lost a Relevos Suicidas Tag Team match to Oficial 911 and Trauma II and were forced to wrestle each other) |
| Trauma I (mask) | Hijo de Dos Caras (Championship) | Naucalpan, Mexico State | IWRG show | February 14, 2016 | (Note: This was a three-way match that also included Herodes Jr., Hijo de Dos Caras risked his championship, Trauma I his mask and Herodes Jr. his hair.) |
| Trauma I (mask) | Canis Lupus (mask) | Naucalpan, Mexico State | IWRG Máscara vs. Máscara | September 4, 2016 | |
