= Eterno (wrestler) =

Mexican professional wrestler

Personal information
- Born: Miguel Ángel Lugo; September 26, 1990 (age 36)

Professional wrestling career
- Ring names: Eterno; Abismo Negro Jr.
- Billed height: 1.73 m (5 ft 8 in)
- Billed weight: 90 kg (198 lb)
- Trained by: Justiciero; Negro Navarro; Black Terry; Rocky Santana
- Debut: September 16, 2006

Miguel Ángel Lugo (born September 26, 1990), better known under the ring name Eterno, is a Mexican professional wrestler. He is signed to the promotions Lucha Libre AAA Worldwide (AAA) and WWE, where he competes under the ring name Abismo Negro Jr. and is a former one-time AAA World Trios Champions and former one-time AAA World Mixed Tag Team Champion. He also makes appearances for International Wrestling Revolution Group (IWRG), Desastre Total Ultraviolento (DTU) and on the Mexican independent circuit portraying a rudo ("bad guy") wrestling character.

== Professional wrestling career ==
Miguel Ángel Lugo made his professional wrestling debut on September 16, 2006, working as an masked wrestler under the ring name "Eterno" (Spanish for "Eternal"). Initially, he worked primarily for in and around Coacalco, State of Mexico, especially on locally promoted shows in Coliseo Coacalo. In July, 2008 Eterno and Lobo Metálico lost a Luchas de Apuestas, or "bet match" to El Forastero and Estigma and thus were forced to permanently unmask. Following his mask loss, Eterno began a long-running storyline rivalry with Daga who also started his career in and around Coacalo. The feud between the two led to a number of well-received matches that would give both Eterno and Daga the opportunity to work for larger wrestling promotions in Mexico. One such promotion was International Wrestling League (IWL) where both Eterno and Daga competed, including a match for the IWL Internet Championship, a match won by Daga. By 2010 Eterno began working for International Wrestling Revolution Group (IWRG) out of Naucalpan where he competed primarily as a rudo, playing the part of the bad guy. His first major IWRG event was the 2010 Guerra de Empresas, teaming with Último Gladiador to defeat the teams of Aeroboy and Violento Jack as well as Daga and Tribal. While working in IWRG he also trained in the IWRG training school under Negro Navarro and Black Terry and participated in IWRG's Torneo Futuro Idolos de Lucha Libre (FILL) tournaments, including one on November 16, 2010 that he won by outlasting 17 other wrestlers in a torneo cibernetico, elimination match that also included Alan Extreme, Bugambilia, Centvrión, Comando Negro, Dinamic Black, Extremo Boy, Golden Bull, Guardian de la Noche, Guerrero 2000, Keshin Black, Maligno, Menfis, Oass, Rayden, Rayito Mendoza, Saruman and Shark Boy. His long running rivalry with Daga gave both of them an opportunity to work for Toryumon Mexico on their 2010 Young Dragons Cup show, with Daga defeating Eterno two falls to one. In 2010 Eterno began working regularly for Desastre Total Ultraviolento (DTU) as well as IWRG, and even formed a group called Los Mazisos that also included Ciclope, Arana de Plata, Pequeno Cobra, Loco Max, Terremoto Negro and La Mazisa. IWRG held a Torneo Relampago de Proyeccion a Nuevas Promesas de la Lucha Libre on January 13, 2011, a tournament where a Novato or rookie teamed up with an experienced wrestler for a tag team tournament. Eterno was teamed up with experienced wrestler Veneno but the duo lost in the first round to eventual tournament winners Comando Negro and Scorpio, Jr. For IWRG's 2011 Rebelión de los Juniors event on March 27 Eterno was forced to team up with El Pollo Asesino to wrestle the team of Comando Negro and Multifacético in a Relevos Suicidas match. The team lost and as per the Relevos Suicidas stipulations were forced to wrestle each other under Luchas de Apuestas rules, a match which Eterno won, forcing El Pollo Asesino to have all his hair shaved off. In May, 2011 Eterno worked his first match for Lucha Libre AAA Worldwide (AAA), one of Mexico's largest wrestling promotions. Eterno teamed up with IWRG representatives Cerebro Negro and Dr. Cerebro to compete in a tournament to determine the first ever holders of the AAA World Trios Championship, but lost to the AAA group Los Bizarros (Billy el Malo, Charly Manson and Cibernetico) in the first round of the tournament. Eterno was one of eight wrestlers competing for the vacant IWRG Intercontinental Welterweight Championship on September 8, 2011, but lost to Dr. Cerebro in the first round.

Eterno won his first ever professional wrestling championship on November 3, 2011 as he defeated Multifacético to win the WWS World Welterweight Championship in a match where Eterno was forced to "bet" his hair against Multifacético's championship. While he saw championship success in IWRG his DTU work was marred by Demoledor's attempt to take over the Los Mazisos group, a storyline that led to a match on December 11, 2011 where Demoledor risked his hair and Eterno put the leadership of Los Mazisos on the line. Eterno won the match, shaved all of Demoledor's hair off and remained the leader of Los Mazisos. Shortly after winning the DTU Luchas de Apuestas match he lost a similar match to IWRG's Bugambilia and was forced to be shaved bald after the match. A few weeks later, on December 22, 2011, Eterno became a double champion as he defeated Golden Magic to win the IWRG Intercontinental Welterweight Championship during IWRG's Arena Naucalpan 34th Anniversary Show. Eterno competed in the 2012 El Protector tournament once again, this time teaming up with veteran Apolo Estrada, Jr. The team lost in the first round to eventual tournament winners Imposible and X-Fly.

In early 2012 Eterno joined one of IWRG's main groups, La Familia de Tijuana, a group that also included Damian 666, Bestia 666, X-Fly, Super Nova, Headhunter A, Zumbi and Halloween. During the first Caravan de Campeones event of 2012, Eterno successfully defended the WWS World Welterweight Championship against Trauma II, but during the second Caravan de Campeones he lost the WWS Championship to Golden Magic. On October 7, 2012 Eterno's IWRG Intercontinental Welterweight Championship run came to an end as he lost to Rayan. Following the championship losses Eterno would be involved in a storyline between the IWRG trainees and Fuerza Guerrera's Gimnasio Konkreto training school. During the Arena Naucalpan 35th Anniversary Show Gimnasio Konkreto defeated the "IWRG Gym" team of Alan Extreme, Centvrión, Dinamic Black, Eita, Eterno, Imposible, Saruman and Violencia, Jr. in an elimination match. The storyline led to a steel cage match involving all 16 wrestlers, where the last man in the cage would lose his mask or be shaved bald. Eterno was the last person to escape the cage, leaving Jhon Crazy behind, forcing him to have his hair shaved off. The storyline against Gimnasio Konkreto wrapped up on February 26, 2013 with a 16-man torneo cibernetico for the Torneo FILL trophy that Eterno had won in 2010. Team IWRG won the match when Konkreto trainee Mr. Leo turned on his team and joined forced with IWRG instead. On April 11, 2013 Eterno defeated El Ángel to win the IWRG Intercontinental Middleweight Championship. Following his championship win Eterno became involved in a storyline feud against Danny Casas, a story that actually started during IWRG's La Guerra de Familias show and escalated in the weeks following the show. As part of their feud Eterno successfully defended the IWRG Intercontinental Middleweight Championship against Danny Casas on April 28. A few days later Eterno and Danny Casas found themselves on opposite sides of a six-man tag team match. During the match Casas had problems getting along with his partners Pantera and Pirata Morgan, going so far as to intentionally lose the match for his team. Afterwards Casas and Eterno attacked Pantera and Pirata Morgan until El Hijo de Pirata Morgan ran to the ring. Afterwards Eterno and Casas jointly challenged the Piratas to defend their title against them. On May 30, 2013 Eterno lost the IWRG Intercontinental Middleweight Championship to El Hijo de Pirata Morgan. On August 11, Eterno and X-Fly defeated Negro Navarro and Trauma I to win the IWRG Intercontinental Tag Team Championship. They lost the title to Los Traumas (Trauma I and Trauma II) on September 1.

In October 2013, Eterno returned to AAA as a member of Juventud Guerrera's new Anarquía stable.

== Championships and accomplishments ==
- International Wrestling Revolution Group
  - Distrito Federal Trios Championship (1 time, current) – with Demonio Infernal and Lunatic Xtreme
  - IWRG Intercontinental Middleweight Championship (2 times)
  - IWRG Intercontinental Tag Team Championship (2 times) – with X-Fly (1) and Canis Lupus (1)
  - IWRG Intercontinental Welterweight Championship (1 time)
  - WWS World Welterweight Championship (1 time)
  - Torneo FILL (November 2010)
- Lucha Libre AAA Worldwide
  - AAA Northern Middleweight Championship (1 time)
  - AAA World Mixed Tag Team Championship (1 time) – with Flammer
  - AAA World Trios Championship (1 time) – with Psicosis and Toxin

== Luchas de Apuestas record ==
Winner (wager)	Loser (wager)	Location	Event	Date	Notes
El Forastero and Estigma (masks)	Lobo Metálico and Eterno (masks)	Coacalco, State of Mexico	Live event	July 20, 2008	
Daga (hair)	Eterno (hair)	Coacalco, State of Mexico	Live event	November 16, 2008	
Hormiga (hair)	Eterno (hair)	Tlalnepantla, State of Mexico	Live event	December 18, 2010	
Eterno (hair)	El Pollo Asesino (hair)	Naucalpan, State of Mexico	IWRG Live event	March 27, 2011	
Bugambilia (hair)	Eterno (hair)	Naucalpan, State of Mexico	IWRG Live event	December 1, 2011	
Eterno (hair)	Demoledor (hair)	Tlalnepantla, State of Mexico	Live event	December 11, 2011	
Eterno (hair)	Jhon Crazy (hair)	Naucalpan, State of Mexico	IWRG Live event	February 3, 2013	(Note: Last two wrestlers in a 16-man steel cage match that also included Alan Extreme, Carta Brava, Jr., Dragón Celestial, Imposible, Saruman, Serpiente de Oro, Violencia, Jr., Boycot, Flehizer, Kiuby, Konkreto, Mr. Leo, Rey Tabú, Vuelo Espacial.)
El Hijo de Pirata Morgan (hair)	Eterno (hair)	Naucalpan, State of Mexico	IWRG Live event	August 1, 2013	(Note: Last two wrestlers in a 10-man steel cage match that also included Chessman, Cien Caras, Jr., Daga, Súper Nova, El Texano, Jr., Trauma I, Trauma II and Villano IV.)
Eterno (hair)	Chicano (hair)	Naucalpan, State of Mexico	IWRG Live event	February 1, 2015	
Mosco X-Fly (hair)	Eterno (hair)	Naucalpan, State of Mexico	Ruleta de la Muerte	April 19, 2015	(Note: Ruleta de la Muerte steel cage match, also involving Ricky Cruz and Veneno.)
Eterno (hair)	Oficial AK-47 (hair)	Naucalpan, State of Mexico	IWRG Live event	September 14, 2015	
Los Insoportables (Hair) (Eterno and Apolo Estrada Jr.)	Los Terribles Cerebros (Hair) (Black Terry and Dr. Cerebro)	Naucalpan, State of Mexico	Arena Naucalpan 38th Anniversary Show	December 20, 2015	
Eterno (hair)	Bombero Infernal (hair)	Naucalpan, State of Mexico	IWRG Show	September 3, 2017	
Aramís (mask)	Eterno (hair)	Coacalco, State of Mexico	Lucha Memes show	October 21, 2018	
