= Veneno (wrestler) =

Panamanian professional wrestler

Personal information
- Born: Rafael Ernesto Medina Baeza; December 7, 1970 (age 55) Panama City, Panama
- Family: Casas

Professional wrestling career
- Ring name(s): Veneno; El Guapo Siniestro
- Billed height: 1.80 m (5 ft 11 in)
- Billed weight: 88 kg (194 lb)
- Trained by: Negro Casas; El Satánico; Kendo; Rambo; Blue Panther; Memo Díaz
- Debut: April 30, 1993

Rafael Ernesto Medina Baeza (born December 7, 1970), better known under the ring name Veneno ("Venom"), is a Panamanian luchador, or professional wrestler, living in Mexico and currently working for the Mexican professional wrestling promotion International Wrestling Revolution Group (IWRG) portraying a tecnico ("Good guy") wrestling character. He is related through marriage to the extended Casas wrestling family as his sister, also a wrestler under the ring name Dalys La Caribeña, is married to Negro Casas.

== Professional wrestling career ==
=== Early career (1993–2000) ===
Rafael Medina is the son of a Panama-based professional wrestling promoter and began his professional wrestling career on April 30, 1993 in his native Panama, working under the ring name "El Guapo Siniestro" ("The Sinister Hansome One"). At some point in the 1990s Mexican wrestler Negro Casas came to Panama to work for Medina's father and provided additional training for Medina. During this timeframe Casas met and married Rafael Medina's sister and when she moved to Mexico Medina followed her, settling down in Mexico.

=== Consejo Mundial de Lucha Libre (2000–2005) ===
In Mexico he became the enmascarado character "Veneno" (Spanish for "Venom") and began working for Consejo Mundial de Lucha Libre (CMLL), one of Mexico's largest, and the world's oldest, wrestling promotion. Veneno worked his first major CMLL show on March 30, 2001 when he teamed up with Rencor Latino, Arkangel de la Muerte only to lose to the team of Astro Rey, Jr., Pantera and El Felino on the under card of CMLL's Juicio Final show. On May 2, 2001 Veneno teamed up with Olímpico to compete in the 2001 Copa Ovaciones, sponsored by the Mexican newspaper Ovaciones. The team lost to Super Parka and Máscara Año 2000 in the first round. He later became a part of Pierroth, Jr.'s Los Boricuas (slang for "The Puerto Ricans") rudo (wrestlers who portray the "bad guys", also known as "heels") group and thus played the part of a Puerto Rican sympathizer, claiming that Puerto Rico was superior to Mexico in terms of the storyline. The group was led by Pierroth and also included Gran Markus, Jr., The Killer, Bestia Salvaje, Poder Boricua, Violencia, Nitro, Hijo del Pierroth, Pierrothito, Pequeño Violencia and La Nazi. Veneno, Hijo de Pirroth and Doctor X defeated Tony Rivera, Tigre Blanco and Volador Jr. on CMLL's annual Sin Piedad show. As a member of Los Boricuas he teamed up with Nitro and Violencia on a regular basis, a trio that competed for a match at the then reigning CMLL World Trios Champions, but were defeated by Los Hermanos Dinamita (Cien Caras, Máscara Año 2000 and Universo 2000) in the first round. In early 2002 Gran Markus, Jr. turned on the rest of Los Borucuas, unhappy with Pierroth's leadership, as part of the storyline junior member Veneno stepped up and wanted to punish the "traitor", which led to a match where both wrestlers put their mask on the line (called a Luchas de Apuestas, or "Bet match"). The match was the main event of CMLL's 2002 Homenaje a Dos Leyendas ("Homage to Two Legends") show on March 17, 2002. The match saw Veneno lose and thus was forced to unmask, reveal his birth name and age in front of everyone in Arena Mexico as per lucha libre traditions. The storyline between Los Boricuas and Gran Markus, Jr. lead to Gran Markus, Jr. defeating Veneno in another Lucha de Apuestas match on November 20, 2002, thus forcing Veneno to be shaved bald after the match. The Los Boricuas storyline was partially abandoned in mid-2003 leaving Veneno and other low ranking Boricuas with no specific storyline to work. On June 20, 2004 Veneno was once again shaved bald, after losing a Luchas de Apuestas match to Tony Rivera

=== International Wrestling Revolution Group (2005–present) ===
In either late 2004 or very early 2005 Veneno stopped working for CMLL and instead started to work for International Wrestling Revolution Group (IWRG), a smaller, regional promotion compared to CMLL. On January 13, 2005 Veneno IWRG decided to have Veneno win his first professional wrestling championship when he defeated Cerebro Negro to win the IWRG Intercontinental Middleweight Championship. He would hold the championship for 146 days, until June 9, 2005 where he was defeated by Black Dragon. He regained the belt a week later, June 16, 2005, when he pinned Black Dragon. His second reign with the championship lasted only 35 days before Cyborg won it on July 21 of that year. On October 9, 2005 Veneno teamed up with Los Terrible Cerebros (Dr. Cerebro and Cerebro Negro to win the Distrito Federal Trios Championship from Los Payasos Tricolores ("The three-colored clowns"; Coco Blanco, Coco Rojo, Coco Verde) Veneno closed out 2005 by winning the Middleweight Championship for a third time on December 11. The third run with the Middleweight Championship turned out to be the longest of the three runs, 230 days in total, lasting until he was defeated by Pantera on July 30, 2006. During 2005 Veneno joined a group known as La Corporacion, a rudo group where the storyline was that they tried to take over IWRG both in the wrestling ring and by trying to buy it. Veneno and fellow Corporacion members Cerebro Negro and Scorpio, Jr. defeated Veneno's in laws Negro Casas, El Felino and Heavy Metal to win the IWRG Intercontinental Trios Championship on January 5, 2005. La Corporacion only held the title for just over a month, vacating the championship in February, 2006 when Scorpio, Jr. stopped working for IWRG. In late 2006 Veneno, El Hijo del Diablo and Fantasma de la Opera won the IWRG Trios Championship by defeating Defeated Dr. Cerebro, Cerebro Negro and Suicida to claim the vacant championship. Their reign lasted 52 days, until February 15, 2007 where they lost the belts to Dr. Cerebro, Cerebro Negro and Suicida.

Veneno also worked for a number of other Mexican promotions as IWRG allowed its wrestlers to work on the Independent circuit between IWRG obligations. One such promotion was Toryumon Mexico where he competed in a tournament for the NWA International Junior Heavyweight Championship, but was eliminated in the first round. By 2010 Veneno began working more as an experienced veteran rudo, or even a tecnico ("good guy" character) when need be, working with younger, lower ranked wrestlers guiding them as they gained experience. One such occasion was the 2010 Torneo Relampago de Proyeccion a Nuevas Promesas de la Lucha Libre ("Projecting a new promise lightning tournament") where he teamed up with rookie Keshin Black, a masked wrestler that was also Rafael Medina's son. The team was lost to Guizmo and Ultraman, Jr. in the first round and was thus eliminated. Veneno teamed up with Cerebro Nego and Kaos to compete for the vacant Distrito Federal Trios Championship, but the trio lost in the first round to eventual tournament winners Los Gringos VIP (Avisman, El Hijo del Diablo and Gringo Loco). In 2011 Veneno was teamed up with rookie Eterno for the 2011 Proyeccion a Nuevas Promesas tournament. The team lost to eventual tournament winners Comando Negro and Scorpio, Jr. in the opening round.

Veneo represented IWRG in IWRG's Guerra de Empresas tournament three times in 2011, the first tournament one took place on January 2, 2011 where Team IWRG of Veneno and Black Terry lost to the Perros del Mal representatives Super Crazy and X-Fly. IWRG held two additional Guerra de Empresas tournaments in June. The first one took place on June 16 and saw Veneno team up with Máscara Año 2000, Jr., defeating Los Terrible Cerebros to earn a spot in the finals, only to be defeated by Los Psycho Circus (Monster Clown and Psycho Clown) representing Asistencia Asesoria y Administracion (AAA). The following week, April 24, Veneno and Máscara Año 2000, Jr. represented IWRG once again, defeating Paranoiko and Violento Jack from Desastre Total Ultraviolento (DTU) but lost to Nicho el Milionario and Pimpinela Escarlata from AAA in the finals. In the summer of 2011 Veneno travelled to Japan to compete for the Japanese wrestling promotion Smash, including competing the a tournament to determine the first ever Smash Champion. Veneno defeated Hajime Ohara in the first round, but lost to StarBuck in the second round of the tournament that took place in the renowned Korakuen Hall in Tokyo. In 2012 IWRG renamed the Proyeccion a Nuevas Promesas tournament, calling it El Protector instead. This time Veneno teamed up with Saruman, defeating the team of Alan Extreme and Black Terry in the first round, but lost to eventual tournament winners Imposible and X-Fly in the semi-finals. At the 2012 Caravan de Campeones show, that took place on May 6, 2012, Veneno was one of 12 wrestlers competing for the vacant IWRG Middleweight Championship, a title Veneno had held three times previously. Veneno qualified for the finals by defeating El Hijo del Diablo in the first round and Super Nova in the second round, only to lose to Oficial AK-47 in the finals. For the 2013 El Protector Veneno teamed up with Centvrión but lost to Eita and Negro Navarro in the semi-final round.

== Championships and accomplishments ==
- International Wrestling Revolution Group
  - IWRG Intercontinental Middleweight Championship (4 times)
  - IWRG Intercontinental Tag Team Championship (2 times, current) – with Alan Extreme (1), Chicano (1, current)
  - IWRG Intercontinental Trios Championship (1 time) – with Scorpio, Jr. and Cerebro Negro (1), El Hijo del Diablo and Fantasma de la Opera (1)
  - Distrito Federal Trios Championship (1 time) – with Dr. Cerebro and Cerebro Negro
  - Copa High Power (2014) - with Alan Extreme, Avisman, Golden Magic, Imposible & Relámpago
  - Arena 23 de junio Trios Championship (2018) - with Canalla JR. & Sangre Fría JR.

== Luchas de Apuestas record ==
Winner (wager)	Loser (wager)	Location	Event	Date	Notes
Guapo Siniestro (hair)	Black Killer (hair)	Panama	Live event	Unknown	
Guapo Siniestro (hair)	Black Warrior de Panamá (hair)	Panama	Live event	Unknown	
Gran Markus, Jr. (hair)	Veneno (mask)	Mexico City	Homenaje a Dos Leyendas (2002)	March 17, 2002	
Veneno (hair)	Super Brazo (hair)	Mexico City	Live event	May 25, 2002	
Veneno (hair) and Violencia (mask)	Mr. México (hair) and Poder Mexica (mask)	Mexico City	Live event	July 14, 2002	
Gran Markus, Jr. (hair)	Veneno (hair)	Mexico City	Live event	November 20, 2002	
Veneno (hair)	Tony Rivera (hair)	Mexico City	Live event	June 20, 2004	
Veneno (hair)	Andy Barrow (hair)	Naucalpan, State of Mexico	Live event	July 25, 2004	(Note: Last two wrestlers in a Steel cage match that also included Dr. Cerebro and Cerebro Negro)
Villano III (hair)	Veneno (hair)	Naucalpan, State of Mexico	Live event	October 17, 2004	
Veneno (hair)	El Lider (hair)	Guadalajara, Jalisco	Live event	June 12, 2005	
Veneno (hair)	Cyborg (hair)	Naucalpan, State of Mexico	Live event	July 17, 2005	
Veneno (hair)	Johnny Reyna (hair)	Merida, Yucatan	Live event	June 18, 2006	
Veneno (hair)	Halcon Salvaje (mask)	Mexico City	Live event	May 5, 2007	
Veneno (hair)	Cyborg (hair)	Naucalpan, State of Mexico	Live event	August 26, 2007	(Note: Lost a Relevos Suicidas match to the team of Black Terry and Cerebro Negro and were forced to wrestle each other.)
Toscano (hair)	Veneno (hair)	Naucalpan, State of Mexico	Live event	December 7, 2014	
Veneno (hair)	Danny Casas	Naucalpan, State of Mexico	IWRG Event	March 5, 2017	(Note: Three-way match that also included Chicano)
