= Caravana de Campeones (November 2013) =

2013 International Wrestling Revolution Group event

- Official poster for the event
- Promotion: International Wrestling Revolution Group
- Date: November 24, 2013
- City: Naucalpan, State of Mexico
- Venue: Arena Naucalpan

Event chronology
← Previous; La Guerra Revolucionaria	Next → Arena Naucalpan 36th Anniversary Show

IWRG Caravana de Campeones chronology
← Previous; August 2013	Next → 2014

The Caravana de Campeones (November 2013), Spanish for "Caravan of Champions", was a major professional wrestling show produced and scripted by the Mexican Lucha libre promotion International Wrestling Revolution Group (IWRG). The event took place on November 24, 2013 in IWRG's main arena Arena Naucalpan. The November 2013 version of the event was the seventh overall show IWRG has held under the Caravana de Campeones banner.

The show featured five championship matches in total, which all ended with the champion successfully retaining their championships. In the main event, Oficial 911 defeated El Hijo del Máscara Año 2000 by disqualification to retain the IWRG Rey del Ring Championship. Los Piratas (El Hijo del Pirata Morgan, Pirata Morgan and Pirata Morgan Jr.) successfully defended the IWRG Intercontinental Trios Championship, Los Traumas (Trauma I and Trauma II) retained the IWRG Intercontinental Tag Team Championship, Los Gringos VIP (Apolo Estrada Jr., Avisman and El Hijo del Diablo) remained the Distrito Federal Trios Champions and Imposible defeated surprise opponent Douki to retain the IWRG Intercontinental Lightweight Championship.

== Production ==
=== Background ===
Professional wrestling has a long running tradition of holding shows that feature several championship matches, and at times actually promotes shows as an "all championship matches" show. The earliest documented "All-Championship" show is the EMLL Carnaval de Campeones ("Carnival of Champions") held on January 13, 1965. In 2007 WWE held a pay-per-view called Vengeance: Night of Champions, making WWE Night of Champions a recurring theme. Starting in 2008 the Mexican lucha libre promotion International Wrestling Revolution Group (IWRG) has held a regular major show labeled Caravana de Campeones, Spanish for "Caravan of Champions" using the same concept for a major annual show. All Caravana de Campeones shows have been held in Arena Naucalpan, IWRG's home arena, the location of all of their major shows through the years. The November 2013 show was the seventh time IWRG has held a Caravana de Campeones show, having not held one in 2010 but held twice in both 2012 and 2013.

=== Storylines ===
The event featured five professional wrestling matches with different wrestlers involved in pre-existing scripted feuds, plots and storylines. Wrestlers portrayed themselves as either heels (referred to as rudos in Mexico, those that portray the "bad guys") or faces (técnicos in Mexico, the "good guy" characters) as they follow a series of tension-building events, which culminated in wrestling matches.

The IWRG Intercontinental Lightweight Championship has had a long tradition of being defended at IWRG's Caravana de Campeones shows ever since holding the inaugural tournament on the first Caravana de Campeones show, the 2009 show, the 2011 show, and the first of the 2012 Caravana de Campeones show, only skipping the second Caravana de Campeones show in 2012. Imposible had captured the championship on July 17, 2013 when he defeated Astro Rey Jr. and Dragón Celestial to win the vacant title. Imposible had successfully defended the championship at the previous Caravana de Campeones show.

The three-man tag team known as Los Gringos VIP (Apolo Estrada Jr., Avisman and El Hijo del Diablo) won the Distrito Federal Trios Championship for the second time when they defeated Los Piratas (El Hijo del Pirata Morgan, Pirata Morgan and Pirata Morgan Jr.) on September 8, 2013. The Caravana de Campeones show would mark their first championship defense.

The brother duo Los Traumas (Trauma I and Trauma II) won the IWRG Intercontinental Tag Team Championship on September 1, when they defeated Eterno and X-Fly. Trauma I was originally supposed to team with his father Negro Navarro as the duo, known as La Dinastia de la Muerte ("The Dynasty of Death") earned the match at the previous 2012 Caravana de Campeones show, but in the end the two brothers teamed up instead to win the championship from Eterno and X-Fly.

While Las Piratas had lost the Distrito Federal Trios Championship to Los Gringos VIP on September 8 the group had remained the IWRG Intercontinental Trios Championship. The father/sons team had won the championship on March 24, 2013 by defeating Los Oficiales (Oficial 911, Oficial AK-47 and Oficial Fierro). The trio were double champions for six months, until Los Gringos VIP ended their run with the Distrito Federal Trios Championship. Las Piratas defended the IWRG Intercontinental Trios Championship on several occasions, including two non-IWRG shows in April, 2013, including losing them briefly to the team of (Hombre Sin Miedo, Kendor Jr., Sobredosis) during a visit to Nuevo Laredo before regaining them the following week. The team was originally slated to defend the championship against La Famila de Tijuana members Eterno, Súper Nova and X-Fly but Eterno was injured in the week leading up the show and was replaced by Fresero Jr. on the night of the show.

in 2002 IWRG introduced the Rey del Ring ("King of the Ring"), an annual professional wrestling tournament. After the 2011 Rey del Ring tournament IWRG presented the winner (Pantera) with a championship belt, a belt that can be defended between the annual tournament. On June 20, 2013 Dinamic Black pinned Oficial 911 to win the IWRG Rey del Ring Championship, less than a month after Oficial 911 won the 2013 Rey del Ring tournament. Oficial 911 would regain the championship on September 5, 2013.

== Results ==
No.	Results	Stipulations
1	Imposible (c) defeated Douki	Singles match for the IWRG Intercontinental Lightweight Championship
2	Los Gringos VIP (Apolo Estrada Jr., Avisman and El Hijo del Diablo) (c) defeated Black Terry, Bombero Infernal and Dr. Cerebro	Six-man tag team match for the Distrito Federal Trios Championship
3	Los Traumas (Trauma I and Trauma II) (c) defeated Los Oficiales (Oficial AK-47 and Oficial Fierro)	tag team match for the IWRG Intercontinental Tag Team Championship
4	Las Piratas (El Hijo de Pirata Morgan, Pirata Morgan and Pirata Morgan Jr.) (c) defeated Fresero Jr. and La Familia de Tijuana (Súper Nova and X-Fly)	Singles match for the IWRG Intercontinental Trios Championship
5	Oficial 911 (c) defeated El Hijo del Máscara Año 2000 by disqualification	Singles match for the IWRG Rey del Ring Championship
(c) / – the champion(s) heading into the match
