= Caravana de Campeones (2014) =

2014 International Wrestling Revolution Group event

- Official poster for the event
- Promotion: International Wrestling Revolution Group
- Date: December 17, 2014
- City: Naucalpan, State of Mexico
- Venue: Arena Naucalpan

Event chronology
← Previous; 52nd Anniversary of Lucha Libre in Estado de México	Next → Arena Naucalpan 37th Anniversary Show

IWRG Caravana de Campeones chronology
← Previous; November 2013	Next → 2015

The Caravana de Campeones (2014), Spanish for "Caravan of Champions", was a major professional wrestling show produced and scripted by the Mexican Lucha libre promotion International Wrestling Revolution Group (IWRG). The event took place on December 17, 2014 in IWRG's main arena Arena Naucalpan. The 2014 version of the event was the eight overall show IWRG has held under the Caravana de Campeones banner since 2008.

The show only featured three championship matches, tied for the fewest championship matches at a Caravana de Campeones show since its creation in 2008. In the third match of the night Imposible successfully defended the IWRG Intercontinental Lightweight Championship against Metaleón. IWRG Intercontinental Welterweight Champion Canis Lupus retained his championship against his regular tag team partner Eterno and in the main event Los Gringos VIP (Apolo Estrada Jr., Avisman and El Hijo del Diablo) remained Distrito Federal Trios Champions as they defeated Danny Casas, Chicano and Hip Hop Man.

== Production ==
=== Background ===
Professional wrestling has a long running tradition of holding shows that feature several championship matches, and at times actually promotes shows as an "all championship matches" show. The earliest documented "All-Championship" show is the EMLL Carnaval de Campeones ("Carnival of Champions") held on January 13, 1965. In 2007 WWE held a pay-per-view called Vengeance: Night of Champions, making WWE Night of Champions a recurring theme. Starting in 2008 the Mexican lucha libre promotion International Wrestling Revolution Group (IWRG) has held a regular major show labeled Caravana de Campeones, Spanish for "Caravan of Champions" using the same concept for a major annual show. All Caravana de Campeones shows have been held in Arena Naucalpan, IWRG's home arena, the location of all of their major shows through the years. The 2014 show was the eight time IWRG has held a Caravana de Campeones show, having not held one in 2010 but held twice in both 2012 and 2013.

=== Storylines ===
The event featured five professional wrestling matches with different wrestlers involved in pre-existing scripted feuds, plots and storylines. Wrestlers portrayed themselves as either heels (referred to as rudos in Mexico, those that portray the "bad guys") or faces (técnicos in Mexico, the "good guy" characters) as they follow a series of tension-building events, which culminated in wrestling matches.

The IWRG Intercontinental Lightweight Championship has had a long tradition of being defended at IWRG's Caravana de Campeones shows ever since holding the inaugural tournament on the first Caravana de Campeones show, the 2009 show, the 2011 show, and the first of the 2012 Caravana de Campeones show, only skipping the second Caravana de Campeones show in 2012. Imposible had captured the championship on July 17, 2013 when he defeated Astro Rey Jr. and Dragón Celestial to win the vacant title. Imposible had successfully defended the championship at the previous Caravana de Campeones show. Imposible successfully retained the lightweight championship against Japanese wrestler Douki at the November 2013 Caravana de Campeones show. In the intervening year Imposible successfully defended the championship on two occasions, against Emperador Azteca on August 10, 2014 and against Dragón Celestial on October 29.

On November 16, 2014 the team of Canis Lupus and IWRG Intercontinental Welterweight Champion were forced to team up in a Relevos Suicida ("Suicide Relay") against Canis Lupus' regular tag team partner Eterno and Súper Nova, Canis Lupus and Golden Magic lost the match and were forced to fight each other in a Lucha de Apuestas, or "bet match", with Golden Magic putting the championship on the line while Canis Lupus would "bet" his mask on the outcome of the match. Canis Lupus won the match and the championship after Eterno returned to ringside to help his partner out. As a result of the title win IWRG made Canis Lupus face off against his regular partner Eterno since he was already signed for a welterweight championship match at the Caravana de Campeones show.

The three-man tag team known as Los Gringos VIP (Apolo Estrada Jr., Avisman and El Hijo del Diablo) won the Distrito Federal Trios Championship for the second time when they defeated Los Piratas (El Hijo del Pirata Morgan, Pirata Morgan and Pirata Morgan Jr.) on September 8, 2013. Los Gringos VIP successfully defended the Distrito Federal Trios Championship during the November 2013 Caravana de Campeones show, defeating Black Terry, Bombero Infernal, Dr. Cerebro.

== Event ==
Los Gringos VIP was originally slated to face the team of Chicano, Danny Casas and X-Fly, but on the night X-Fly did not show up and IWRG was forced to replace him with Hip Hop Man who had already wrestled one match earlier in the night.

== Aftermath ==
Los Gringos VIPs reign as Distrito Federal Trios Champions lasted six more months, until June 14, 2015 where the group lost to Los Terribles Cerebros ("The Terrible Brains", Black Terry, Cerebro Negro and Dr. Cerebro). In the aftermath of the title los Los Gringos VIP broke up, with El Hijo del Diablo attacking Apolo Estrada Jr. El Hijo del Diablo, Imposible and El Diablo Jr. I formed Los Mariachi Locos and won the Distrito Federal Trios Championship.

Canis Lupus remained the IWRG Intercontinental Welterweight Championship until April 18, 2016 where IWRG declared the championship vacant. While no official explanation had been given Canis Lupus had not defended the championship since the 2014 Caravana de Campeones show and began a storyline feud with IWRG Intercontinental Heavyweight Champion Trauma II at the next IWRG show.

=== Results ===
No.	Results	Stipulations
1	Vampiro Metálico II defeated Atomic Star	Singles match
2	Galaxy and Sky Angel defeated Araña de Plata Jr. and Hip Hop Man	Tag team match
3	Imposible (c) defeated Metaleon	Singles match for the IWRG Intercontinental Lightweight Championship
4	Canis Lupus (c) defeated Eterno	Singles match for the IWRG Intercontinental Welterweight Championship
5	Los Gringos VIP (Apolo Estrada Jr., Avisman and El Hijo del Diablo) (c) defeated Chicano, Danny Casas and Hip Hop Man	Six-man tag team match for the Distrito Federal Trios Championship
(c) / – the champion(s) heading into the match
