= Caravana de Campeones (August 2013) =

2013 International Wrestling Revolution Group event

- Official poster for the show
- Promotion: International Wrestling Revolution Group
- Date: August 15, 2013
- City: Naucalpan, State of Mexico
- Venue: Arena Naucalpan

Event chronology
← Previous; Festival de las Máscaras	Next → El Castillo del Terror

IWRG Caravana de Campeones chronology
← Previous; August 2012	Next → November 2013

The Caravana de Campeones (August 2013), Spanish for "Caravan of Champions", was a major professional wrestling show produced and scripted by the Mexican Lucha libre promotion International Wrestling Revolution Group (IWRG). The event took place on August 25, 2013 in IWRG's main arena Arena Naucalpan. The August 2013 version of the event was the sixth overall show IWRG has held under the Caravana de Campeones banner.

Four of the six matches were for championships while the remaining two were to determine number one contenders for championships. Due to Heddi Karaoui not appearing at the event IWRG made Oficial 911 face off against El Centvrión to determine the challenger for Dinamic Black's IWRG Rey del Ring Championship, the two wrestled to a draw and both challenged Dinamic Black who retained his title. Imposible successfully defended the IWRG Intercontinental Lightweight Championship, El Hijo del Pirata Morgan successfully defended the IWRG Intercontinental Middleweight Championship and Trauma II retained the IWRG Junior de Juniors Championship.

== Production ==
=== Background ===
Professional wrestling has a long running tradition of holding shows that feature several championship matches, and at times actually promotes shows as an "all championship matches" show. The earliest documented "All-Championship" show is the EMLL Carnaval de Campeones ("Carnival of Champions") held on January 13, 1965. In 2007 WWE held a pay-per-view called Vengeance: Night of Champions, making WWE Night of Champions a recurring theme. Starting in 2008 the Mexican lucha libre promotion International Wrestling Revolution Group (IWRG) has held a regular major show labeled Caravana de Campeones, Spanish for "Caravan of Champions" using the same concept for a major annual show. All Caravana de Campeones shows have been held in Arena Naucalpan, IWRG's home arena, the location of all of their major shows through the years. The August 2013 show was the sixth time IWRG has held a Caravana de Campeones show, having not held one in 2010 but held twice in both 2012 and 2013.

=== Storylines ===
The event featured six professional wrestling matches with different wrestlers involved in pre-existing scripted feuds, plots and storylines. Wrestlers portrayed themselves as either heels (referred to as rudos in Mexico, those that portray the "bad guys") or faces (técnicos in Mexico, the "good guy" characters) as they follow a series of tension-building events, which culminated in wrestling matches.

The IWRG Intercontinental Lightweight Championship has had a long tradition of being defended at IWRG's Caravana de Campeones shows ever since holding the inaugural tournament on the first Caravana de Campeones show, the 2009 show, the 2011 show, and the first of the 2012 Caravana de Campeones show, only skipping the second Caravana de Campeones show in 2012. Imposible had captured the championship on July 17, 2013 when he defeated Astro Rey Jr. and Dragón Celestial to win the vacant title, with the Caravana de Campeones show marking his first title defense.

in 2002 IWRG introduced the Rey del Ring ("King of the Ring"), an annual professional wrestling tournament. After the 2011 Rey del Ring tournament IWRG presented the winner (Pantera) with a championship belt, a belt that can be defended between the annual tournament. On June 20, 2013 Dinamic Black pinned Oficial 911 to win the IWRG Rey del Ring Championship, less than a month after Oficial 911 won the 2013 Rey del Ring tournament.

El Hijo del Pirata Morgan won the IWRG Intercontinental Middleweight Championship on May 30, 2013 by defeating Eterno to become the 33rd overall champion. He successfully defended the championship against El Hijo de Máscara Año 2000 in the lead up to the Caravana de Campeones show.

Lucha libre has a strong family tradition, with many second or third-generation wrestlers competing as "Junior" or "Hijo de" (Spanish for "Son of"). In February 2011 created the IWRG Junior de Juniors Championship, with the unique stipulation that only second or third-generation wrestlers were allowed to challenge for it. In accordance with storyline some "Juniors", for instance Cien Caras Jr., are not actually the son of a wrestler, but instead pay for the rights to use the name, but IWRG acknowledges the storyline relationship as if it was real. On June 9, 2013 Trauma II (son of Negro Navarro) defeated Carta Brava Jr. to win the Junior de Juniors title.

== Event ==
Dinamic Black was originally scheduled to defend the IWRG Rey del Ring Championship against French wrestler Heddi Karaoui, but Karaoui did not appear on the night. Instead IWRG opted to have Oficial 911 and El Centvrión wrestle each other for the rights to face Dinamic Black. When that match ended in a draw both wrestlers faced off against the champion only moments later. Dinamic Black successfully retained the title when he pinned El Centvrión.

The fifth match of the night was originally supposed to feature La Dinastia del la Muerte ("The Dynasty of Death"; Negro Navarro and Trauma I) defending the IWRG Intercontinental Tag Team Championship against whichever team won a qualifying match the Sunday before Caravana de Campeones. The plans hanged when La Dinastia de la Muerte lost the tag team championship to Eterno and X-Fly on August 11, four days before the Caravana de Campiones show. Due to the title change La Dinastia instead wrestled Las Piratas (Pirata Morgan and Pirata Morgan Jr.) to become the number one contenders for the tag team championships.

The main event was described as more of a fight than a wrestling match as Trauma II and Súper Nova fought both inside and outside the ring. During the third fall Súper Nova performed a dive to the outside of the ring but Trauma II moved and Súper Nova ended up landing wrong on his leg. Moments later Trauma II attacked the injured leg, which led to Súper Nova's corner man Eterno throwing in the towel to prevent further damage. At the time it was not clear if the injury was a legitimate injury suffered by Súper Nova or part of the storyline of the match.

== Results ==
No.	Results	Stipulations
1	Imposible (c) defeated Golden Magic	IWRG Intercontinental Lightweight Championship
2	Oficial 911 vs. El Centvrión ended in a draw (double pinfall)	#1-Contender Match IWRG Rey del Ring Championship
3	Dinamic Black (c) defeated Oficial 911 and El Centvrión	3-Way Match - IWRG Rey del Ring Championship
4	El Hijo del Pirata Morgan (c) defeated Eterno	IWRG Intercontinental Middleweight Championship
5	La Dinastía de la Muerte (Negro Navarro and Trauma I) defeated Las Piratas (Pirata Morgan and Pirata Morgan Jr.)	#1-Contenders Match IWRG Intercontinental Tag Team Championship
6	Trauma II (c) defeated Súper Nova	Singles match for the IWRG Junior de Juniors Championship
(c) / – the champion(s) heading into the match
