= Caravana de Campeones (2015) =

2015 International Wrestling Revolution Group event

- Official poster for the event
- Promotion: International Wrestling Revolution Group
- Date: October 11, 2015
- City: Naucalpan, State of Mexico
- Venue: Arena Naucalpan

Event chronology
← Previous; La Gran Cruzada	Next → El Castillo del Terror

IWRG Caravana de Campeones chronology
← Previous; 2014	Next → —

Caravana de Campeones (2015) (Spanish for "Caravan of Champions") was a major annual professional wrestling event produced and scripted by Mexican Lucha Libre, or professional wrestling promotion, International Wrestling Revolution Group (IWRG). The show was held on October 11, 2015 in Arena Naucalpan, Naucalpan, State of Mexico, Mexico, IWRG's main arena. The 2015 version of the event was the ninth overall show IWRG has held under the Caravana de Campeones banner. As the name indicates the focal point of the show was the various championships promoted by IWRG as every match was for a championship.

In the main event of the five-match show Máscara Año 2000 Jr. defeated El Hijo de Dos Caras to win the IWRG Intercontinental Heavyweight Championship. Golden Magic retained the IWRG Junior de Juniors Championship by defeating Trauma II, while Los Gringos VIP (consisting of Apolo Estrada Jr. and El Hijo del Diablo) kept the IWRG Intercontinental Tag Team Championship against the challenge of Canis Lupus and Trauma I. In the second match of the night Imposible continuing his year-and-a-half long reign as the IWRG Intercontinental Lightweight Champion by defeating El Hijo del Pantera. In the opening match IWRG allowed Hip Hop Man to defend the AIWA Argentinian National Cruiserweight Championship on their show, defeating Tortuga Leo.

== Production ==
=== Background ===
Professional wrestling has a long running tradition of holding shows that feature several championship matches, and at times actually promotes shows as an "all championship matches" show. The earliest documented "All-Championship" show is the EMLL Carnaval de Campeones ("Carnival of Champions") held on January 13, 1965. In 2007 WWE held a pay-per-view called Vengeance: Night of Champions, making WWE Night of Champions a recurring theme. Starting in 2008 the Mexican lucha libre promotion International Wrestling Revolution Group (IWRG) has held a regular major show labeled Caravana de Campeones, Spanish for "Caravan of Champions" using the same concept for a major annual show. All Caravana de Campeones shows have been held in Arena Naucalpan, IWRG's home arena, the location of all of their major shows through the years. The 2015 show was the ninth time IWRG has held a Caravana de Campeones show, having not held one in 2010 but held twice in both 2012 and 2013.

=== Storylines ===
The event featured five professional wrestling matches with different wrestlers involved in pre-existing scripted feuds, plots and storylines. Wrestlers portrayed themselves as either heels (referred to as rudos in Mexico, those that portray the "bad guys") or faces (técnicos in Mexico, the "good guy" characters) as they follow a series of tension-building events, which culminated in wrestling matches.

During the summer of 2014 Argentinean wrestler Hip Hop Man returned to is native Argentina after spending over a year working for IWRG in Mexico. While in Argentina he won the AIWA Argentinian National Cruiserweight Championship., a championship he took with him back to Mexico. In August 2014 Dragón Celestial won the championship from Hip Hop Man on the 2014 Prison Fatal show, only for Hip Hop Man to regain it on April 5, 2015.

The IWRG Intercontinental Lightweight Championship has had a long tradition of being defended at IWRG's Caravana de Campeones shows ever since holding the inaugural tournament on the first Caravana de Campeones show, the 2009 show, the 2011 show, and the first of the 2012 Caravana de Campeones show, only skipping the second Caravana de Campeones show in 2012. Imposible had captured the championship on July 17, 2013 when he defeated Astro Rey Jr. and Dragón Celestial to win the vacant title. Imposible had successfully defended the championship at the previous Caravana de Campeones show. Imposible successfully retained the lightweight championship against Japanese wrestler Douki at the November 2013 Caravana de Campeones show. In the intervening year Imposible successfully defended the championship on two occasions, against Emperador Azteca on August 10, 2014 and against Dragón Celestial on October 29. At the 2014 Caravana de Campeones show Imposible successfully defended the championship against Metaleon.

Los Gringos VIP normally competed as a trio, but on September 16, 2015 the duo won the IWRG Intercontinental Tag Team Championship when they won a match that involved both the champions Pantera and El Hijo del Pantera as well as Los Traumas (Trauma I and Trauma II). The 2015 Caravana de Campeones show would be their first title defense.

Lucha libre has a strong family tradition, with many second or third-generation wrestlers competing as "Junior" or "Hijo de" (Spanish for "Son of"). In February 2011 created the IWRG Junior de Juniors Championship, with the unique stipulation that only second or third-generation wrestlers were allowed to challenge for it. In accordance with storyline some "Juniors", for instance Cien Caras Jr., are not actually the son of a wrestler, but instead pay for the rights to use the name, but IWRG acknowledges the storyline relationship as if it was real. On August 23, 2015 Golden Magic (son of professional wrestler Mr. Magia) defeated Súper Nova to become the twelfth overall IWRG Junior de Juniors Champion.

El Hijo de Dos Caras, son of lucha libre legend Dos Caras, won the IWRG Intercontinental Heavyweight Championship on July 20, 2015 as he won a six-way ladder match against Pirata Morgan, L.A. Park, Demon Clown, Dr. Wagner Jr. and Máscara Sagrada to win the vacant championship. Subsequently, the son of Dos Caras began a long running storyline with the sons of Máscara Año 2000, El Hijo de Máscara Año 2000 Máscara Año 2000 Jr. leading up to the main event of the 2015 Caravana de Campeones show.

== Results ==
No.	Results	Stipulations
1	Hip Hop Man (c) defeated Tortuga Leo	Best two-out-of-three falls match the AIWA Argentinian National Cruiserweight Championship
2	Imposible (c) defeated El Hijo del Pantera	Best two-out-of-three falls match for the IWRG Intercontinental Lightweight Championship
3	Los Gringos VIP (El Hijo del Diablo and Apolo Estrada Jr.) (c) defeated Canis Lupus and Trauma I	Two Out Of Three Falls Tag team match for the IWRG Intercontinental Tag Team Championship
4	Golden Magic (c) defeated Trauma II	Best two-out-of-three falls match for the IWRG Junior de Juniors Championship
5	Máscara Año 2000 Jr. defeated El Hijo de Dos Caras (c)	Best two-out-of-three falls matchfor the IWRG Intercontinental Heavyweight Championship
(c) / – the champion(s) heading into the match
