= IWRG Caravana de Campeones =

International Wrestling Revolution Group event series

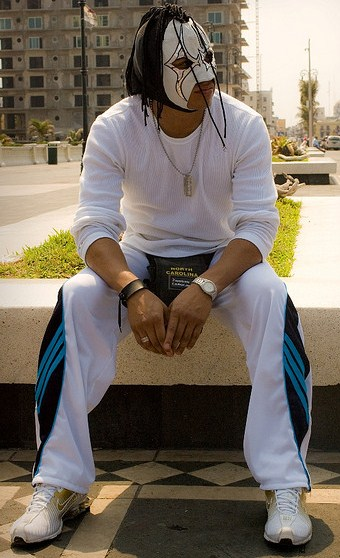
Trauma I, one of only four wrestlers to have competed at six different Caravana de Campeones events.

Caravana de Campeones is a major professional wrestling show series produced and scripted by the Mexican lucha libre promotion International Wrestling Revolution Group (IWRG) on a near-annual basis since its inception in 2008. The focal point of the shows are the various championships promoted by IWRG, both those actually branded as IWRG championships as well as other championships promoted by IWRG. These can be either long term or short term such as the Distrito Federal Trios Championship which has been under IWRG's control since 2007, or the WWS World Welterweight Championship which IWRG has on occasion used on their shows.

For most major lucha libre shows the main events are usually a Lucha de Apuesta, or "bet match", where competitors risk their wrestling mask or hair, but for the Caravana de Campeones series the main event has always been a championship match, with several championship matches on the undercard as well. The 2015 Caravana de Campeones show was the ninth show held under that banner since 2008, with two held in both 2012 and 2013 but none in 2010. In addition to the official IWRG championships, the IWRG promoters have also used both the WWS World Welterweight Championship and the AIWA Argentinian National Cruiserweight Championship despite not being official championships.

== Event history ==
Professional wrestling has a long running tradition of holding shows that feature several championship matches, and at times actually promotes shows as an "all championship matches" show. The earliest documented "All-Championship" show is the EMLL Carnaval de Campeones ("Carnival of Champions") held on January 13, 1965. In 2007 WWE held a pay-per-view called Vengeance: Night of Champions, making WWE Night of Champions a recurring theme. Starting in 2008 the Mexican lucha libre promotion International Wrestling Revolution Group (IWRG) has held a regular major show labeled Caravana de Campeones, Spanish for "Caravan of Champions". They did not hold a Caravana de Campeones show in 2010, but in both 2012 and 2013 held two shows during the year under the Caravana de Campeones banner.

IWRG has nine championships that they actively promote, including the IWRG Intercontinental Heavyweight Championship, the IWRG Intercontinental Lightweight Championship, the IWRG Intercontinental Middleweight Championship, the IWRG Intercontinental Tag Team Championship, the IWRG Intercontinental Trios Championship, the IWRG Intercontinental Welterweight Championship, the IWRG Junior de Juniors Championship, the IWRG Rey del Ring Championship and the Distrito Federal Trios Championship. Due to the volume of championships, no show has featured every single active championship being "defended" at one show, but all active IWRG championships have been challenged on at least one Caravana de Campeones. The IWRG Intercontinental Lightweight Championship was first introduced at the 2008 Caravana de Campeones show, with IWRG holding a tournament on the show. The first of the 2012 Caravana de Campeones show featured a tournament for the vacant IWRG Intercontinental Middleweight Championship. IWRG has also promoted a championship match for the WWS World Welterweight Championship (April 2012 Caravana de Campeones) and the AIWA Argentinian National Cruiserweight Championship at the 2015 Caravana de Campeones show. The IWRG Lightweight Championship has been shown at eight out of the nine shows, making it the most often contested for championship of the Caravana de Campeones series.

As of the 2015 Caravana de Campeones show a total of ninety wrestlers have appeared on the nine shows IWRG has held over the years. 86 wrestlers were male and only 4 were female, with only a single women's wrestling match being held at the 2011 Caravana de Campeones show. Four men have competed in six shows, or 66.6% of all Caravana de Campeones shows; Oficial 911, Oficial AK-47, Trauma I and Trauma II while Dr. Cerebro and Oficial Fierro have competed in five. Canis Lupus has worked two Cavarana de Campeones shows under the "Canis Lupus" mask and previously worked both the 2009 and 2011 Caravana de Campeones shows under the name "Comando Negro". IWRG has held a total of 55 matches spread out over the nine shows, with the April 2012 show having the most matches, 12, due to the IWRG Intercontinental Middleweight Championship tournament being part of the show. Of the remaining eight shows three has had six matches and five have had five matches on the show. Only 7 out of the 55 matches, or 12%, were non-title matches. All championship matches were contested under Best two-out-of-three falls rules and none of the matches were specialty matches such as a steel cage match or a no disqualification rules.

The April 2013, November 2013 and 2014 Caravana de Campeones saw all championships retained, while the remaining shows saw at least one championship changing hands. The 2014 Caravana de Campeones show featured only three championship matches, the least of any show. In 2008 the lightweight and the welterweight championships changed hands. On the 2009 show Zatura won the IWRG Intercontinental Lightweight Championship from Tetsuya Bushi. In 2011 Comando Negro defeated Dr. Cerebro to win the same IWRG Intercontinental Lightweight Championship, while both the tag team and the trios championships were kept. In April 2012 the WWS World Welterweight Championship was kept on the Caravana de Campeones show, the first non-IWRG championship to be defended during the series. During the second Caravana de Campeones show in 2012 Golden Magic defeated Eterno to win the WWS World Welterweight Championship while El Hijo de Pirata Morgan defeated Oficial Factor to win the IWRG Rey del Ring Championship. On the 2015 version of the Caravana de Campeones show Máscara Año 2000 Jr. defeated El Hijo de Dos Caras to win the IWRG Heavyweight Championship.

The events feature professional wrestling matches with different wrestlers involved in pre-existing scripted feuds, plots and storylines. Wrestlers portray themselves as either heels (referred to as rudos in Mexico, those that portray the "bad guys") or faces (técnicos in Mexico, the "good guy" characters) as they follow a series of tension-building events, which culminated in wrestling matches with predetermined outcomes.

== Dates, venues, and main events ==
| Event | Date | City | Venue | Main event | Ref(s) |
|---|---|---|---|---|---|
| 2008 | May 29, 2008 | Naucalpan, Mexico State | Arena Naucalpan | El Hijo del Cien Caras and Máscara Año 2000 Jr. vs. El Dandy and Silver King | |
| 2009 | March 15, 2009 | Naucalpan, Mexico State | Arena Naucalpan | El Hijo del Cien Caras and Máscara Año 2000 Jr. vs. The Headhunters | |
| 2011 | January 30, 2011 | Naucalpan, Mexico State | Arena Naucalpan | Los Oficiales (Oficial 911, Oficial AK-47 and Oficial Fierro) vs. Los Perros del Mal (Bestia 666, Damian 666 and X-Fly) | |
| May 2012 | May 1, 2012 | Naucalpan, Mexico State | Arena Naucalpan | La Dinastia de la Muerte (Negro Navarro and Trauma I) vs. La Familia de Tijuana (Bestia 666 and Damian 666) | |
| August 2012 | August 1, 2012 | Naucalpan, Mexico State | Arena Naucalpan | Los Oficiales (Oficial 911, Oficial AK-47 and Oficial Fierro) (C) defeated La Familia de Tijuana (Bestia 666, Damian 666 and Super Nova) | |
| August 2013 | August 15, 2013 | Naucalpan, Mexico State | Arena Naucalpan | Trauma II vs Súper Nova | |
| November 2013 | November 24, 2013 | Naucalpan, Mexico State | Arena Naucalpan | Oficial 911 vs El Hijo del Máscara Año 2000 | |
| 2014 | December 17, 2014 | Naucalpan, Mexico State | Arena Naucalpan | Los Gringos VIP (Apolo Estrada Jr., Avisman and El Hijo del Diablo) vs. Chicano, Danny Casas and Hip Hop Man | |
| 2015 | October 11, 2015 | Naucalpan, Mexico State | Arena Naucalpan | El Hijo de Dos Caras vs. Máscara Año 2000 Jr. | |
| 2017 | September 17, 2017 | Naucalpan, Mexico State | Arena Naucalpan | Black Warrior and Warrior Jr. (c) vs. Herodes Jr. and Máscara Año 2000 Jr. for the IWRG Intercontinental Tag Team Championship | |
| 2018 | September 9, 2018 | Naucalpan, Mexico State | Arena Naucalpan | Mr. Electro vs. El Hijo del Medico Asesino for the IWRG Intercontinental Heavyweight Championship | |

== Championships ==
As of the 2015 Caravana de Campeones show

| Championship | Event(s) | Ref(s) |
|---|---|---|
| AIWA Argentinian National Cruiserweight Championship | 2015 | |
| Distrito Federal Trios Championship | 2008, 2009, August 2012, November 2013, 2014 | |
| IWRG Intercontinental Heavyweight Championship | August 2012, 2015 | |
| IWRG Intercontinental Lightweight Championship | 2008, 2009, 2011, April 2012, August 2013, November 2013, 2014, 2015 | |
| IWRG Intercontinental Middleweight Championship | April 2012, August 2013 | |
| IWRG Intercontinental Tag Team Championship | 20082009, 2011, April 2012, November 2013, 2015 | |
| IWRG Intercontinental Trios Championship | 2009, 2011, November 2013 | |
| IWRG Intercontinental Welterweight Championship | 2008, 2014 | |
| IWRG Junior de Juniors Championship | August 2012, August 2013, 2015 | |
| IWRG Rey del Ring | August 2012, August 2013, November 2013 | |
| WWS World Welterweight Championship | April 2012, August 2012 | |
