= Caravana de Campeones (2008) =

2008 International Wrestling Revolution Group event

- Promotion: International Wrestling Revolution Group
- Date: May 29, 2008
- City: Naucalpan, State of Mexico
- Venue: Arena Naucalpan

Event chronology
← Previous; IWRG Zona de Combata	Next → Rey del Ring

IWRG Caravana de Campeones chronology
← Previous; First	Next → 2009

The Caravana de Campeones (2008), Spanish for "Caravan of Champions", was a major professional wrestling show produced and scripted by the Mexican Lucha libre promotion International Wrestling Revolution Group (IWRG). The event took place on May 29, 2008 in IWRG's main arena Arena Naucalpan. and was the first documented instance of IWRG using the Caravana de Campeones title for one of their shows. It would subsequently become an annual event.

The 2008 Caravana de Campeones featured a total of six matches, five of which were for IWRG Championships, including determining the first ever holder of the IWRG Intercontinental Lightweight Championship, Freelance. During the show Los Oficiales (Oficial 911, Oficial AK-47 and Oficial Fierro) successfully defended the Distrito Federal Trios Championship and El Hijo del Cien Caras and Máscara Año 2000 Jr. retained the IWRG Intercontinental Tag Team Championship in the main event. On the undercard Fuerza Guerrera won the IWRG Intercontinental Welterweight Championship as he defeated champion Multifacético.

== Production ==
=== Background ===
Professional wrestling has a long running tradition of holding shows that feature several championship matches, and at times actually promotes shows as an "all championship matches" show. The earliest documented "All-Championship" show is the EMLL Carnaval de Campeones ("Carnival of Champions") held on January 13, 1965. In 2007 WWE held a pay-per-view called Vengeance: Night of Champions, making WWE Night of Champions a recurring theme.

The Mexican Lucha Libre held their first Caravana de Campeone ("Caravan of Champions") show on May 29, 2008 adopting the same concept with a show with multiple championship matches, although in IWRG's case the show did not feature all their championships being defended, having six active championships at the time and another being created specifically for the show. The first Caravana de Campeones was held in IWRG's main venue, Arena Naucalpan, the same location subsequent Caravana de Campeones shows were held. Since 2008 IWRG has made the Caravana de Campeones a semi-regular event, holding a show almost every year, with some years seeing two Caravana de Campeones shows.

=== Storylines ===
The event featured six professional wrestling matches with different wrestlers, where some were involved in pre-existing scripted feuds or storylines and others simply put together by the matchmakers without a backstory. Being a professional wrestling event matches are not won legitimately through athletic competition; they are instead won via predetermined outcomes to the matches that is kept secret from the general public. Wrestlers portray either heels (the bad guys, referred to as Rudos in Mexico) or faces (fan favorites or Técnicos in Mexico).

In the weeks prior to the Caravana de Campeones show IWRG announced that they were creating a new championship, the IWRG Intercontinental Lightweight Championship, adding another weight division to their existing six championships. In Mexico the Lightweight division is defined as for wrestlers between 70 kg (150 lb) and 77 kg (170 lb). IWRG decided to determine the first champion by taking a group of ten wrestlers; Aeroman, Avisman, Black Thunder, Cerebro Negro, Dr. Cerebro, Freelance, Halcón 2000, Marco Rivera, Star Boy and Turbo. Those ten wrestlers would face off in a Torneo Cibernetico elimination match until eight of the ten wrestles were eliminated. The last two wrestlers would then face off in a Best two-out-of-three falls match.

Another featured match on the show would see the IWRG Intercontinental Welterweight Champion Multifacético would defend against Fuerza Guerrera, with Guerrera having Black Terry in his corner for the night. Multifacético and Black Terry had been involved in a long-running storyline feud, starting shortly after Multifacético made his debut. Initially it was believed that Multifacético was just another trainee of Black Terry, but it was actually later revealed that Multifacético was Black Terry's son, working the storyline to help Multifacético become popular with the fans. As part of their feud Multifacético had defeated Terry in a Lucha de Apuestas match only a month prior, forcing Black Terry to have his hair shaved off as a result.

Prior to 2007 the Distrito Federal Trios Championship had laid dorman for a while, not used by any of the promotions in or around Mexico CIty for an extended period of time. On July 19, 2007 Los Oficiales (Oficial 911, Oficial AK-47 and Oficial Fierro) defeated the team of Kai, Sasaki, Yamato to win the championship. Records are unclear if Kai, Sasaki, and Yamato were the champions or if it was the finals of a tournament. Following the championship win Los Oficiales would defend the championship on multiple occasions, using it to elevate their presence in IWRG with successful defenses against such trios as Freelance, Kid Tiger and Star Boy as well as the previous version of Los Oficiales (Capitain Muerte, Cyborg and Xibalba) and others.

The team known as Los Junior Dinamitas, El Hijo de Cien Caras and Máscara Año 2000, Jr. defeated Pantera and El Felino to win the IWRG Intercontinental Tag Team Championship on May 31, 2007. The duo had successful defenses against such teams as Electroshot and El Hijo del Aníbal, Pierroth and Hijo del Pierroth, Heavy Metal and Negro Casas and Dr. Wagner Jr. and Silver King.

== Aftermath ==
The storyline between Fuerza Guerrera, Multifacético and Black Terry continued throughout 2008, including Black Terry winning a Triagula de la Muerte match against the two to win the IWRG Intercontinental Welterweight Championship on September 7, only to lose the championship to Guerrera on November 16, 2008. The storyline between father and son continued throughout 2008, into 2009 until Multifacético left IWRG and began working as Guerrero Maya Jr. in Consejo Mundial de Lucha Libre (CMLL).

El Hijo del Cien Caras and Máscara Año 2000 Jr. remained tag team champions for over another year, losing the championship to Scorpio Jr. and Ricky Cruzz on August 9, 2009. Los Oficiales followed up their trios success of Caravan de Campeones by defeating Cyborg, Kraneo and Xibalba to win the IWRG Intercontinental Trios Championship on September 28, 2008. Their run with the Distrito Federal Trios Championship ended when they lost to Los Terrible Cerebros ("The Terrible Brains"; Black Terry, Dr. Cerebro and Cerebro Negro) on December 7, 2008. Freelance's reign as the first-ever IWRG Intercontinental Welterweight Champion lasted 255 days, with one successful title defense. He lost the title to Tetsuya on February 8, 2009.

The following year IWRG held another Caravana de Campeones show, and would continue using the name on a regular basis in the years to follow.

== Results ==
No.	Results	Stipulations	Times
1^{D}	Jack and Rey de Corazónes defeated Los Traumas (Trauma I and Trauma II)	tag team match	—
2	Aeroman and Freelance defeated Avisman, Black Thunder, Cerebro Negro, Dr. Cerebro, Halcón 2000, Marco Rivera, Star Boy and Turbo	Torneo cibernetico IWRG Intercontinental Lightweight Championship tournament, semi-final match	09:43
3	Freelance defeated Aeroman	Singles match for the IWRG Intercontinental Lightweight Championship	09:24
4	Los Oficiales (Oficial 911, Oficial AK-47 and Oficial Fierro) (c) defeated Los Creyentes (Demony, Septiembre Negro II and Veneno)	Six-man tag team match for the Distrito Federal Trios Championship	19:34
5	Fuerza Guerrera defeated Multifacético (c)	Singles match for the IWRG Intercontinental Welterweight Championship	17:25
6	El Hijo del Cien Caras and Máscara Año 2000 Jr. (c) defeated El Dandy and Silver King	Tag team match for the IWRG Intercontinental Tag Team Championship	26:00
(c) / – the champion(s) heading into the match; D / – this was a dark match
