= Caravana de Campeones (2009) =

2009 International Wrestling Revolution Group event

- Promotion: International Wrestling Revolution Group
- Date: March 15, 2009
- City: Naucalpan, State of Mexico
- Venue: Arena Naucalpan

Event chronology
← Previous; Guerra del Golfo	Next → Guerra Revolucionaria

IWRG Caravana de Campeones chronology
← Previous; 2008	Next → 2011

The Caravana de Campeones (2009), Spanish for "Caravan of Champions", was a major professional wrestling show produced and scripted by the Mexican Lucha libre promotion International Wrestling Revolution Group (IWRG). The event took place on March 15, 2008 in IWRG's main arena Arena Naucalpan. The 2009 event was the second overall show IWRG has held under the Caravana de Campeones banner.

The show featured a total of five matches, four of which were for championships. Los Terrible Cerebros successfully defended the Distrito Federal Trios Championship, Los Oficiales successfully defended the IWRG Intercontinental Trios Championship and the team of El Hijo del Cien Caras and Máscara Año 2000 Jr. retained the IWRG Intercontinental Tag Team Championship. Zatura defeated Tetsuya Bushi to win the IWRG Intercontinental Lightweight Championship, the only championship match that ended with a new champion.

== Production ==
=== Background ===
Professional wrestling has a long running tradition of holding shows that feature several championship matches, and at times actually promotes shows as an "all championship matches" show. The earliest documented "All-Championship" show is the EMLL Carnaval de Campeones ("Carnival of Champions") held on January 13, 1965. In 2007 WWE held a pay-per-view called Vengeance: Night of Champions, making WWE Night of Champions a recurring theme. Starting in 2008 the Mexican lucha libre promotion International Wrestling Revolution Group (IWRG) has held a regular major show labeled Caravana de Campeones, Spanish for "Caravan of Champions" using the same concept for a major annual show. All Caravana de Campeones shows have been held in Arena Naucalpan, IWRG's home arena, the location of all of their major shows through the years. The 2009 show was the second time IWRG has held a Caravana de Campeones show.

=== Storylines ===
The event featured five professional wrestling matches with different wrestlers involved in pre-existing scripted feuds, plots and storylines. Wrestlers portrayed themselves as either heels (referred to as rudos in Mexico, those that portray the "bad guys") or faces (técnicos in Mexico, the "good guy" characters) as they follow a series of tension-building events, which culminated in wrestling matches.

On December 17, 2008 Los Terrible Cerebros ("The Terrible Brains"), the team of Black Terry, Cerebro Negro and Dr. Cerebro defeated Los Oficiales (Oficial 911, Oficial AK-47 and Oficial Fierro) to win the Distrito Federal Trios Championship, ending Los Oficiales reign after 507 days. Since winning the championship Los Terrible Cerebros successfully defended the Distrito Federal Trios Championship against the trio of Barba Roja, Capitan Muerte and Pirata Morgan Jr. on January 15, 2009 and then against the trio of Chico Chele and Los Gemelo Fantastico ("The Fantastic Twins", Gemelo Fantastico I and Gemelo Fantastico II) on February 1. During the latter championship bout Gemelo Fantastico II was injured when he landed wrong performing a move. IWRG use the real life injury to create a storyline where Gemelo Fantastico I searched for two tag team partners to take on Los Terrible Cereros at the 2009 Caravana de Campeones show.

After being introduced at the 2008 Caravana de Campeones show the IWRG Intercontinental Lightweight Championship initial champion Freelance lost the championship to Japanese wrestler Tetsuya Bushi on February 8, 2009 during an IWRG show. Following the title change tecnico Zatura was named the next challenger and announced that he would get his title match at the Caravana de Campeones show.

On September 28, 2008 Los Oficiales won the IWRG Intercontinental Trios Championship from the trio of Cyborg, Kraneo and Xibalva, adding it to the Distrito Trios Championship that they already held at that time. They later lost the Distrio Federal Trios Championship to Los Terrible Cerebros. Afterwards Los Oficiales successfully defended the IWRG Intercontinetl Trios Championship against Los Terrible Cerebros on December 25, 2008. In 2009 they successfully defended the championship against the trio of Zatura, Trauma I and Trauma II on January 22, against Dr. Cerebro, Freelance and Multifacético and then against Zatura, Pedulo and Multifacético prior to the 2009 Caravana de Campeones show.

The storyline cousins El Hijo del Cien Caras and Máscara Año 2000 Jr. (Hijo de Cien Caras paid for the nme and was not related to Cien Caras nor Máscara Año 2000) had won the IWRG Intercontinental Tag Team Championship from El Felino and Pantera on May 31, 2007 and by the time Caravana de Campeones came around had been champions for 654 days in total. During that time the champions had logged successful defenses against the teams of Electroshock and Hijo de Aníbal, Pierroth and Hijo de Pierroth, El Hijo de Solitario and Hijo de Aníbal, Heavy Metal and Negro Casas, Rayo de Jalisco Jr. and Hijo de Aníbal, Dr. Wagner Jr. and Silver King, They also successfully defended the championship at the first Caravana de Campeones as they defeated El Dandy and Silver King.

== Aftermath ==
Zatura's reign as the IWRG Intercontinental Lightweight Championship only lasted one match as he lost the belt to Trauma II on June 18, 2009. Los Terrible Cerebros would go on to defend the championship throughout 2009, but in 2010 the championship was declared vacant as the champions had not teamed together for a while. Los Oficiales reign as IWRG Intercontinental Trios Champions until March 2011 when they were defeated by Los Maniacos ("The Maniacs"; Silver King, Joe Líder and Último Gladiador. Hijo de Cien Caras and Máscara Año 2000 Jr. had no more successful title defenses after defeating the Headhunters, losing the tag team titles to Scorpio Jr. and Ricky Cruzz on August 9, 2009.

== Results ==
No.	Results	Stipulations	Times
1	Judás el Traidor and Comando Negro defeated Latin Brother and Garra del Águila	tag team match	14:01
2	Los Terrible Cerebros (Dr. Cerebro, Cerebro Negro and Black Terry) (c) defeated Gemelo Fantastico I and Los Traumas (Trauma I and Trauma II)	Six-man tag team match for the Distrito Federal Trios Championship	16:47
3	Zatura defeated Tetsuya Bushi (c)	Singles match for the IWRG Intercontinental Lightweight Championship	10:18
4	Los Oficiales (Oficial 911, Oficial AK-47 and Oficial Fierro) (c) defeated Arlequín, Hijo del Pierroth and Pierroth II	Six-man tag team match for the IWRG Intercontinental Trios Championship	07:39
5	El Hijo del Cien Caras and Máscara Año 2000 Jr. (c) defeated The Headhunters (Head Hunter A and Head Hunter B)	Tag team match for the IWRG Intercontinental Tag Team Championship	14:17
(c) / – the champion(s) heading into the match
