= Caravana de Campeones (August 2012) =

2012 International Wrestling Revolution Group event

- Official poster for the event
- Promotion: International Wrestling Revolution Group
- Date: August 12, 2012
- City: Naucalpan, State of Mexico
- Venue: Arena Naucalpan

Event chronology
← Previous; La Gran Cruzada	Next → Ruleta de la Muerte

IWRG Caravana de Campeones chronology
← Previous; May 2012	Next → August 2013

Caravana de Campeones (August 2012) (Spanish for "Caravan of Champions") was an annual professional wrestling major event produced and scripted by Mexican professional wrestling promotion International Wrestling Revolution Group (IWRG), which took place on August 12, 2012 in Arena Naucalpan, Naucalpan, State of Mexico, Mexico. Every match on the show featured a champion defending their title, with two changing hands; Golden Magic defeating Eterno to win the WWE World Welterweight Championship while El Hijo de Pirata Morgan pinned Oficial Factor to win the IWRG Rey del Ring Championship. The IWRG Junior de Juniors Championship, the IWRG Intercontinental Heavyweight Championship and the Distrito Federal Trios Championship were all successfully defended

The event featured five professional wrestling matches in total with different wrestlers involved in pre-existing scripted feuds or storylines. Being a professional wrestling event matches are not won legitimately through athletic competition; they are instead won via predetermined outcomes to the matches that is kept secret from the general public. The August 2012 version of the event was the fifth overall show IWRG has held under the Caravana de Campeones banner.

== Production ==
=== Background ===
Professional wrestling has a long running tradition of holding shows that feature several championship matches, and at times actually promotes shows as an "all championship matches" show. The earliest documented "All-Championship" show is the EMLL Carnaval de Campeones ("Carnival of Champions") held on January 13, 1965. In 2007 WWE held a pay-per-view called Vengeance: Night of Champions, making WWE Night of Champions a recurring theme. Starting in 2008 the Mexican lucha libre promotion International Wrestling Revolution Group (IWRG) has held a regular major show labeled Caravana de Campeones, Spanish for "Caravan of Champions" using the same concept for a major annual show. All Caravana de Campeones shows have been held in Arena Naucalpan, IWRG's home arena, the location of all of their major shows through the years. The August 2012 show was the fifth time IWRG has held a Caravana de Campeones show, having not held one in 2010 but held twice in 2012.

=== Storylines ===
The event featured five professional wrestling matches with different wrestlers involved in pre-existing scripted feuds, plots and storylines. Wrestlers portrayed themselves as either heels (referred to as rudos in Mexico, those that portray the "bad guys") or faces (técnicos in Mexico, the "good guy" characters) as they follow a series of tension-building events, which culminated in wrestling matches.

In 2010 El Hijo del Diablo appeared at an IWRG event with the WWS World Welterweight Championship around his waist, claiming that he won it on the independent circuit, but never specified when or from who. Over the following years IWRG allowed the championship to be defended on their shows despite not originating in IWRG. Eterno was the defending champion going into the August version of the Caravana de Campeones, having defeated Multifacético to win the title on November 3, 2011. He had previously successfully defended the championship on the April Caravana de Campeones show when he defeated Chicano.

Lucha libre has a strong family tradition, with many second or third-generation wrestlers competing as "Junior" or "Hijo de" (Spanish for "Son of"). In February 2011 created the IWRG Junior de Juniors Championship, with the unique stipulation that only second or third-generation wrestlers were allowed to challenge for it. In accordance with storyline some "Juniors", for instance Cien Caras Jr., are not actually the son of a wrestler, but instead pay for the rights to use the name, but IWRG acknowledges the storyline relationship as if it was real. On July 1, 2012 Hijo de Máscara Año 2000 (not actually a son of Máscara Año 2000) defeated Bestia 666 to win the IWRG Junior de Juniors Championship.

in 2002 IWRG introduced the Rey del Ring ("King of the Ring"), an annual professional wrestling tournament. After the 2011 Rey del Ring tournament IWRG presented the winner (Pantera) with a championship belt, a belt that can be defended between the annual tournament. Oficial Factor won the 2012 Rey del Ring tournament and thus also won the championship.

Traditionally the heavyweight championship is considered the top title of any wrestling promotion, but in lucha libre it's normally not the case, with the focus being on the lower weight limits. The defending champion, Cien Caras Jr., won the IWRG Intercontinental Heavyweight Championship from Headhunter I on June 21, 2012. He won the match, and the championship by disqualification as IWRG rules states a championship can change hands on a disqualification.

Los Oficiales (Oficial 911, Oficial AK-47 and Oficial Fierro) became two-time Distrito Federal Trios Champions on July 27, 2012, when they defeated long-time rivals Los Oficiales Elite (Oficial Factor, Oficial Rayan and Oficial Spartan) to win the championship. The Caravan de Campeones match against Los Perros del Mal ("The Bad Dogs") team of Bestia 666, Damián 666 and Súper Nova would be their first title defense of their second reign.

== Results ==
No.	Results	Stipulations
1	Golden Magic defeated Eterno (c) – two falls to one	Best two-out-of-three falls singles match for the WWS World Welterweight Championship
2	Hijo de Máscara Año 2000 (c) vs. El Hijo de L.A. Park ended in a draw	Best two-out-of-three falls singles match for the IWRG Junior de Juniors Championship
3	Hijo de Pirata Morgan defeated Oficial Factor (c) – two falls to one	Best two-out-of-three falls singles match for the IWRG Rey del Ring
4	Cien Caras, Jr. (c) defeated X-Fly – two falls to one	Best two-out-of-three falls singles match for the IWRG Intercontinental Heavyweight Championship
5	Los Oficiales (Oficial 911, Oficial AK-47 and Oficial Fierro) (c) defeated La Familia de Tijuana (Bestia 666, Damian 666 and Super Nova) – two falls to one	Best two-out-of-three falls six-person tag team match for the Distrito Federal Trios Championship
(c) / – the champion(s) heading into the match
