= Caravana de Campeones (2011) =

2011 International Wrestling Revolution Group event

- Official poster for the Caravana de Campeones
- Promotion: International Wrestling Revolution Group
- Date: January 30, 2011
- City: Naucalpan, State of Mexico
- Venue: Arena Naucalpan

Event chronology
← Previous; Proyeccion a Nuevas Promesas	Next → La Jaula del Honor

IWRG Caravana de Campeones chronology
← Previous; 2009	Next → May 2012

Caravans de Campeones (2011) (Spanish for "Caravan of Champions") was an annual professional wrestling major event produced and scripted by Mexican professional wrestling promotion International Wrestling Revolution Group (IWRG), which took place on January 30, 2011 in Arena Naucalpan, Naucalpan, State of Mexico, Mexico. As the name indicates the events center around the various championships promoted by IWRG. The 2011 event was the third overall show IWRG has held under the Caravana de Campeones banner.

For the 2011 event Comando Negro defeated Dr. Cerebro to win the IWRG Intercontinental Lightweight Championship, the third time in three shows that a new lightweight champion was crowned. Also on the show Los Piratas (El Hijo de Pirata Morgan and Pirata Morgan) successfully defended the IWRG Intercontinental Tag Team Championship against El Brazo and El Veneo and the IWRG Intercontinental Trios Champions Los Oficiales (Oficial 911, Oficial AK-47 and Oficial Fierro) successfully fended off Los Perros del Mal ("The Bad Dogs"; Bestia 666, Damián 666 and X-Fly).

== Production ==
=== Background ===
Professional wrestling has a long running tradition of holding shows that feature several championship matches, and at times actually promotes shows as an "all championship matches" show. The earliest documented "All-Championship" show is the EMLL Carnaval de Campeones ("Carnival of Champions") held on January 13, 1965. In 2007 WWE held a pay-per-view called Vengeance: Night of Champions, making WWE Night of Champions a recurring theme. Starting in 2008 the Mexican lucha libre promotion International Wrestling Revolution Group (IWRG) has held a regular major show labeled Caravana de Campeones, Spanish for "Caravan of Champions" using the same concept for a major annual show. All Caravana de Campeones shows have been held in Arena Naucalpan, IWRG's home arena, the location of all of their major shows through the years. The 2011 show was the third time IWRG has held a Caravana de Campeones show, having not held one in 2010.

=== Storylines ===
The event featured five professional wrestling matches with different wrestlers, where some were involved in pre-existing scripted feuds or storylines and others simply put together by the matchmakers without a backstory. Being a professional wrestling event matches are not won legitimately through athletic competition; they are instead won via predetermined outcomes to the matches that is kept secret from the general public. Wrestlers portray either heels (the bad guys, referred to as Rudos in Mexico) or faces (fan favorites or Técnicos in Mexico).

Dr. Cerebro had defeated Japanese wrestler Tetsuya Bushi to win the IWRG Intercontinental Lightweight Championship for the first time on January 10, 2010, becoming the seventh wrestler overall to hold the championship. Since winning the title he successfully defended it against El Hijo del Diablo and El Hijo del Pantera as well as winning the WWS World Welterweight Championship in a match where both championships were on the line.

The father/son team of El Hijo de Pirata Morgan (Literally "the son of Pirata Mogan") and Pirata Morgan, collectively known as Los Piratas won the IWRG Intercontinental Tag Team Championship for the second time when they defeated the Los Junior Dinamitas team of El Hijo del Cien Caras and Máscara Año 2000 Jr. on November 14, 2010. In the weeks leading up the Caravana de Campeones show it looked like their next challengers would be the team of El Brazo and El Brazo Jr., a masked wrestler who had paid for the use of the name and was not actually a biological son of El Brazo, but when the show was announced El Brazo was teamed up with El Veneno to challenge for the championship.

Los Oficiales (Oficial 911, Oficial AK-47 and Oficial Fierro) had won the IWRG Intercontinental Trios Championship from the team of Cyborg, Kraneo and Xibalva on September 29, 2008 and held it for a total of 853 days prior to the 2011 Caravana de Campeones show. The trio had multiple successful title defense in that period of time, including a successful defense against Arlequín, Hijo de Pierroth and Pierroth II at the 2009 Caravana de Campeones show. In mid-2010 rival Mexican wrestling promotion AAA began working with IWRG, creating an "invasion storyline" where wrestlers from AAA would invade Arena Naucalpan and IWRG wrestlers would show up at AAA events. Los Oficiales defended the IWRG side on several occasions, defending the trios championship against AAA teams of Aero Star, Gato Everready and Laredo Kid as well as Amadeus, Gran Apache and Taboo. In the fall of 2010 the Perros del Mal promotion joined in as a third faction in the storyline. the father/son team of Damián 666 and Bestia 666 was joined by X-Fly to challenge Los Oficiales, promising that they would end Los Oficiales multi-year reign.

== Aftermath ==
Los Oficiales marathon reign with the IWRG Intercontinental Trios Championship was ended just over a month later, ending it at 886 days when AAA representatives Los Maniacos (Joe Líder, Silver King and Último Gladiador) defeated them on March 30, 2011.

Los Piratas second reign with the tag team championship came to an end on March 18, just a month and a half after their successful defense at the Caravana de Campeons. The team lost to the father/son team of Negro Navarro and Trauma I.

Comando Negro's reign as the IWRG Intercontinental Lightweight Championship lasted until November 3, 2011 when he lost the belt to Dinamic Black. Comando Negro would later be given a new masked ring character, "Canis Lupus". The lightweight championship was also defended at the April version of the 2012 Caravana de Campeones show, which marked the first time it was successfully defended at a Caravana de Campeones show when Carta Brava Jr. defeated Chicano.

== Results ==
No.	Results	Stipulations
1	Lily Fighter and Ludark Shaitan defeated Lolita and Sexy Lady – two falls to one	Tag team best two-out-of-three falls tag team match
2	Chico Che, Dinamic Black and Freelance defeated Hammer, Magnifico and Masada	Best two-out-of-three falls six-man tag team match
3	Comando Negro defeated Dr. Cerebro (C) – two falls to one	Best two-out-of-three falls singles match for the IWRG Intercontinental Lightweight Championship
4	Los Piratas (El Hijo de Pirata Morgan and Pirata Morgan) (C) defeated El Brazo and Veneno – two falls to one	Best two-out-of-three falls match for the IWRG Intercontinental Tag Team Championship
5	Los Oficiales (Oficial 911, Oficial AK-47 and Oficial Fierro) (C) defeated Los Perros del Mal (Bestia 666, Damian 666 and X-Fly) – two falls to one	Best two-out-of-three falls match for the IWRG Intercontinental Trios Championship
