= Caravana de Campeones (May 2012) =

2012 International Wrestling Revolution Group event

- Official poster for the show
- Promotion: International Wrestling Revolution Group
- Date: May 6, 2012
- City: Naucalpan, State of Mexico
- Venue: Arena Naucalpan

Event chronology
← Previous; Guerra del Golfo	Next → Rey del Ring

IWRG Caravana de Campeones chronology
← Previous; 2011	Next → August 2012

Caravana de Campeones (May 2012) (Spanish for "Caravana of Champions") was an annual professional wrestling major event produced and scripted by Mexican professional wrestling promotion International Wrestling Revolution Group (IWRG), which took place on April 6, 2012 in Arena Naucalpan, Naucalpan, State of Mexico, Mexico. The events always feature multiple title matches, in this case three championships were defended and IWRG held a tournament to determine the next holder of the IWRG Intercontinental Middleweight Championship which was declared vacant in the weeks prior to the Caravana de Campeones show.

The May 2012 version of the event was the fourth overall show IWRG has held under the Caravana de Campeones banner. The event featured eleven professional wrestling matches with different wrestlers involved in pre-existing scripted feuds or storylines. Being a professional wrestling event matches are not won legitimately through athletic competition; they are instead won via predetermined outcomes to the matches that is kept secret from the general public.

== Production ==
=== Background ===
Professional wrestling has a long running tradition of holding shows that feature several championship matches, and at times actually promotes shows as an "all championship matches" show. The earliest documented "All-Championship" show is the EMLL Carnaval de Campeones ("Carnival of Champions") held on January 13, 1965. In 2007 WWE held a pay-per-view called Vengeance: Night of Champions, making WWE Night of Champions a recurring theme. Starting in 2008 the Mexican lucha libre promotion International Wrestling Revolution Group (IWRG) has held a regular major show labeled Caravana de Campeones, Spanish for "Caravan of Champions" using the same concept for a major annual show. All Caravana de Campeones shows have been held in Arena Naucalpan, IWRG's home arena, the location of all of their major shows through the years. The April 2012 show was the fourth time IWRG has held a Caravana de Campeones show, having not held one in 2010 but held twice in 2012.

=== Storylines ===
The event featured twelve professional wrestling matches with different wrestlers involved in pre-existing scripted feuds, plots and storylines. Wrestlers portrayed themselves as either heels (referred to as rudos in Mexico, those that portray the "bad guys") or faces (técnicos in Mexico, the "good guy" characters) as they follow a series of tension-building events, which culminated in wrestling matches.

The IWRG Intercontinental Middleweight Championship was created in 1997, the year after IWRG was founded, specifically for male wrestlers between 82 kg (181 lb) and 87 kg (192 lb). In 2007 Negro Casas won the championship by defeating Villano III to win the vacant championship. Casas worked for Consejo Mundial de Lucha Libre (CMLL) who had worked with IWRG for many years, but in late 2007 the relationship was broken off and Casas ceased working for IWRG, but never lost the championship in the ring. On May 1, 2012 IWRG officially declared the championship vacant as they announced that the 2012 Caravana de Campeones would host an eight-man tourmant for the championship.

On December 22, 2011 Carta Brava Jr. defeated Dinamic Black to win the IWRG Intercontinental Lightweight Championship, becoming the 10th over-all champion. The championship had been defended, and changed hands at each of the previous three championships and with the April 2012 Caravana de Campeones it became the only championship to have been featured on all four shows held up to that point.

La Dinastia de la Muerte ("The Dynasty of Death"; the father/son team of Negro Navarro and Trauma I) became the 18th overall holders of the IWRG Intercontinental Tag Team Championship on March 18, 2012 when they defeated Las Piratas (El Hijo del Pirata Morgan and Pirata Morgan). the May Caravana de Campeones would be the first time the team put the championship on the line after winning it.

In 2010 El Hijo del Diablo appeared at an IWRG event with the WWS World Welterweight Championship around his waist, claiming that he won it on the independent circuit, but never specified when or from who. Over the following years IWRG allowed the championship to be defended on their shows despite not originating in IWRG. The champion prior to Caravna de Campeons was Eterno, who had defeated Multifacético to win the title on November 3, 2011.

== Results ==
No.	Results	Stipulations
1	Alan Extreme and Polifacetico defeated Saruman and Star Boy, Jr. – two falls to one	Tag team best two-out-of-three falls tag team match
2	Carta Brava, Jr. (C) defeated Chicano – two falls to one	Best two-out-of-three falls singles match or the IWRG Intercontinental Lightweight Championship
3	Eterno (C) defeated Trauma II – two falls to one	Best two-out-of-three falls singles match for the WWS World Welterweight Championship
4	Super Nova and Dr. Cerebro defeated Veneno, El Hijo del Diablo, Oficial AK-47, Oficial Spartan, Tony Rivera The Mummy	IWRG Intercontinental Middleweight Championship tournament seeding battle royal
5	The Mummy defeated Tony Rivera	IWRG Intercontinental Middleweight Championship tournament quarter-final
6	Oficial AK-47 defeated Oficial Spartan	IWRG Intercontinental Middleweight Championship tournament quarter-final
7	Veneno defeated El Hijo del Diablo	IWRG Intercontinental Middleweight Championship tournament quarter-final
8	Super Nova defeated Dr. Cerebro	IWRG Intercontinental Middleweight Championship tournament quarter-final
9	Oficial AK-47 defeated The Mummy	IWRG Intercontinental Middleweight Championship tournament semi-final
10	Veneno defeated Super Nova	IWRG Intercontinental Middleweight Championship tournament semi-final
11	Oficial AK-47 defeated Veneno	IWRG Intercontinental Middleweight Championship tournament final
12	La Dinastia de la Muerte (Negro Navarro and Trauma I) (C) defeated La Familia de Tijuana (Bestia 666 and Damian 666) – two falls to one	Tag team best two-out-of-three falls tag team match for the IWRG Intercontinental Tag Team Championship
