= IWRG Intercontinental Welterweight Championship =

Professional wrestling championship by International Wrestling Revolution Group

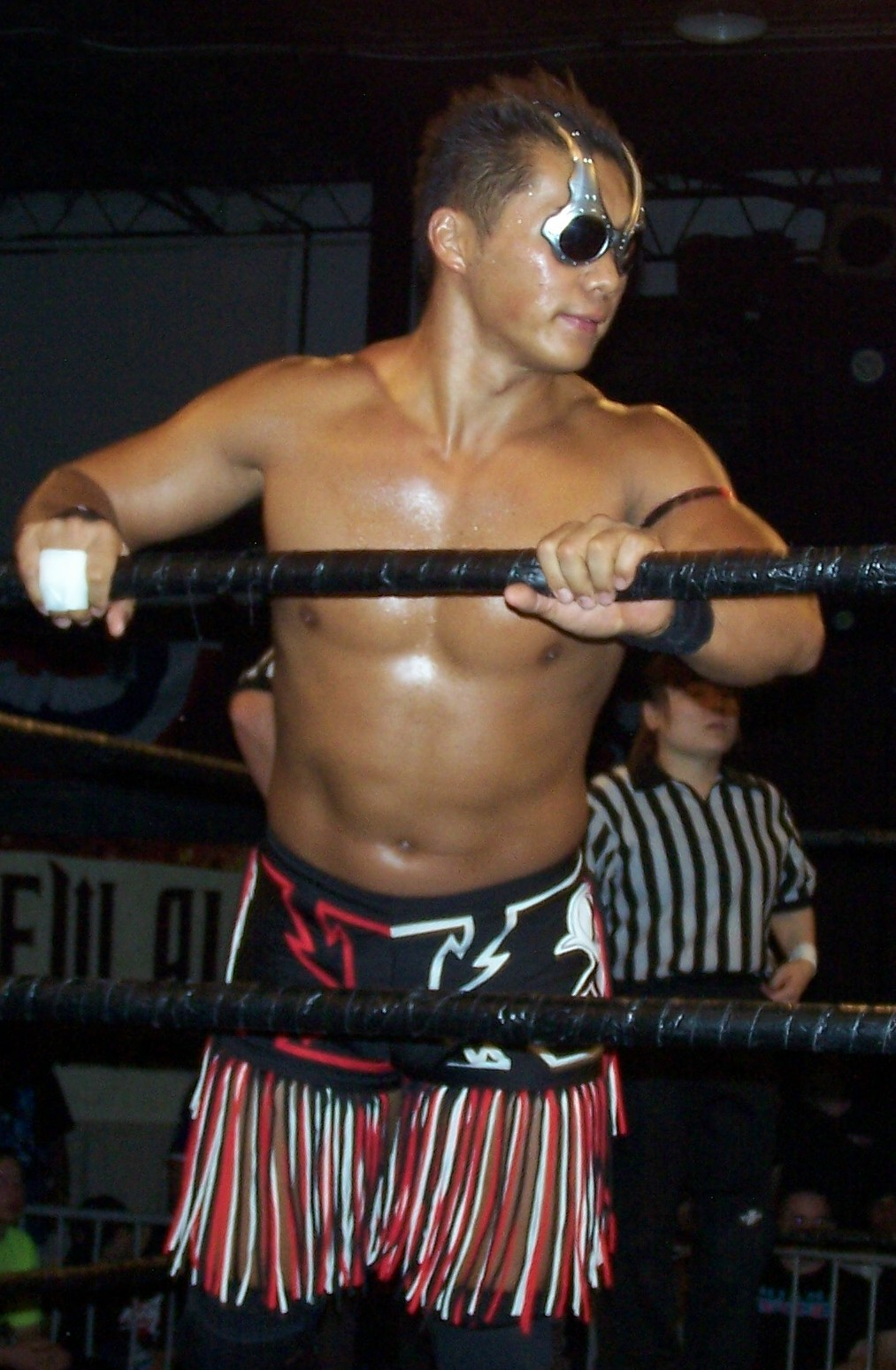
- Shiima Nobunaga, the second ever Welterweight champion

Details
- Promotion: International Wrestling Revolution Group
- Date established: March 1, 1998
- Current champion: Dr. Cerebro Jr.
- Date won: January 1, 2024
Statistics
- First champion: Dr. Cerebro
- Most reigns: Cerebro Negro (7 reigns)
- Longest reign: Dr. Cerebro (788 days)
- Shortest reign: Cerebro Negro (11 days)

The IWRG Intercontinental Welterweight Championship (Campeonato Intercontinental Welter IWRG in Spanish) is a professional wrestling championship promoted by the Mexican promotion International Wrestling Revolution Group (IWRG) since 1998. The official definition of the Welterweight weight class in Mexico is between 70 kg (150 lb) and 78 kg (172 lb), but the weight limits are not always strictly adhered to. (Note: One example the weightlimits not being strictly enforced is Mephisto winning the CMLL World Welterweight Championship, a championship with a 78 kg (172 lb) upper limit despite weighing 90 kg (200 lb).) Because Mexican wrestling promoters puts more emphasis on the lower weight classes, this division is considered more important than the normally more prestigious heavyweight division of the promotion.

The first Welterweight champion was Dr. Cerebro, winning the title on March 1, 1998, in a tournament final against Shiima Nobunaga. Dr. Cerebro Jr. is the current champion, having defeated Puma de Oro and then-champion Tonali for the title on January 1, 2024. Dr. Cerebro Jr. is the 40th overall champion and the 22nd person to have held the championship. Cerebro Negro is the person with most title reigns, a total of seven. He also has the distinction of having the shortest reign (at seven days) and the longest reign (1,246 days).

As it is a professional wrestling championship, the championship was not won not by actual competition, but by a scripted ending to a match determined by the bookers and match makers. (Note: Hornbaker (2016) p. 550: "Professional wrestling is a sport in which match finishes are predetermined. Thus, win–loss records are not indicative of a wrestler's genuine success based on their legitimate abilities – but on now much, or how little they were pushed by promoters") On occasion the promotion declares a championship vacant, which means there is no champion at that point in time. This can either be due to a storyline, (Note: Duncan & Will (2000) p. 271, Chapter: Texas: NWA American Tag Team Title [World Class, Adkisson] "Championship held up and rematch ordered because of the interference of manager Gary Hart") or real life issues such as a champion suffering an injury being unable to defend the championship, (Note: Duncan & Will (2000) p. 20, Chapter: (United States: 19th Century & widely defended titles – NWA, WWF, AWA, IW, ECW, NWA) NWA/WCW TV Title "Rhodes stripped on 85/10/19 for not defending the belt after having his leg broken by Ric Flair and Ole & Arn Anderson") or leaving the company. (Note: Duncan & Will (2000) p. 201, Chapter: (Memphis, Nashville) Memphis: USWA Tag Team Title "Vacant on 93/01/18 when Spike leaves the USWA.")

== Title history ==
Key
No.	Overall reign number
Reign	Reign number for the specific champion
Days	Number of days held
N/A	Unknown information
(NLT)	Championship change took place "no later than" the date listed
†	Championship change is unrecognized by the promotion
+	Current reign is changing daily

No.	Champion	Championship change			Reign statistics		Notes	Ref.
No.	Champion	Date	Event	Location	Reign	Days	Notes	Ref.
1	Dr. Cerebro	March 1, 1998	IWRG show	Naucalpan, State of Mexico	1	287	Defeated Shiima Nobunaga in the finals of a 16-man tournament.	
2	Shiima Nobunaga	December 13, 1998	IWRG show	Naucalpan, State of Mexico	1	175		
3	Último Vampiro	June 6, 1999	IWRG show	Naucalpan, State of Mexico	1	340		
4	Dr. Cerebro	May 11, 2000	IWRG show	Naucalpan, State of Mexico	2	49		
5	Ciclón Ramírez	June 29, 2000	IWRG show	Naucalpan, State of Mexico	1	45		
6	Dr. Cerebro	August 13, 2000	IWRG show	Naucalpan, State of Mexico	3	788		
7	Cerebro Negro	October 10, 2002	IWRG show	Naucalpan, State of Mexico	1	17		
8	Fantasy	October 27, 2002	IWRG show	Naucalpan, State of Mexico	1	301		
9	Cerebro Negro	August 24, 2003	IWRG show	Naucalpan, State of Mexico	2	105		
10	Avisman	December 7, 2003	IWRG show	Naucalpan, State of Mexico	1	497		
11	Cerebro Negro	April 17, 2005	IWRG show	Naucalpan, State of Mexico	3	7		
12	Avisman	April 24, 2005	IWRG show	Naucalpan, State of Mexico	2	287		
13	Fantasma de la Ópera	February 5, 2006	IWRG show	Naucalpan, State of Mexico	1	175		
14	Panterita/Freelance	July 30, 2006	IWRG show	Naucalpan, State of Mexico	1	210	Panterita changed his ring persona to Freelance during the title reign.	
15	Cerebro Negro	February 25, 2007	IWRG show	Naucalpan, State of Mexico	4	21		
16	Fantasma de la Ópera	March 18, 2007	IWRG show	Naucalpan, State of Mexico	2	123	Defeated Cerebro Negro in a 10-man steel cage match.	
17	Black Terry	July 19, 2007	IWRG show	Naucalpan, State of Mexico	1	94		
18	Cerebro Negro	October 21, 2007	IWRG show	Naucalpan, State of Mexico	5	11		
19	Fantasma de la Ópera	November 1, 2007	IWRG show	Naucalpan, State of Mexico	3	45	Defeated Cerebro Negro and Black Terry in a three-way elimination title vs. mask vs. hair match. Ópera's mask, Negro's title and Terry's hair were at stake. Negro was the last to be pinned, so he lost the title.	
20	Black Terry	December 16, 2007	IWRG show	Naucalpan, State of Mexico	2	98		
21	Multifacético	March 23, 2008	IWRG show	Naucalpan, State of Mexico	1	67		
22	Fuerza Guerrera	May 29, 2008	IWRG show	Naucalpan, State of Mexico	1	101		
23	Black Terry	September 7, 2008	IWRG show	Naucalpan, State of Mexico	3	70	Defeated Multifacético and Fuerza Guerrera in a three-way elimination title vs. mask vs. hair match. Multifacético's mask, Guerrera's title and Terry's hair were at stake. Guerrera was the last to be pinned, so he lost the title	
24	Fuerza Guerrera	November 16, 2008	IWRG show	Naucalpan, State of Mexico	2	553	Defeated Black Terry in a match with Guerrera's mask and Terry's hair and title on the line.	
25	Dr. Cerebro	May 23, 2010	IWRG show	Naucalpan, State of Mexico	4	14		
26	CIMA	June 6, 2010	IWRG show	Naucalpan, State of Mexico	2	448		
—	Vacated	August 28, 2011	—	—	—	—	Vacated when CIMA did not return to Mexico to defend the championship.	
27	Golden Magic	September 8, 2011	IWRG show	Naucalpan, State of Mexico	1	105	Defeated Bestia 666 in a tournament final to win the vacant title.	
28	Eterno	December 22, 2011		Naucalpan, State of Mexico	1	290	Eterno's WWS Welterweight Championship was also on the line in the match.	
29	Oficial Rayan	October 7, 2012	IWRG show	Naucalpan, State of Mexico	1	140		
30	Dinamic Black	February 24, 2013	IWRG show	Naucalpan, State of Mexico	1	210		
—	Vacated	September 22, 2013	—	—	—	—	Vacated when Dinamic Black left IWRG.	
31	Canis Lupus	September 29, 2013	IWRG show	Naucalpan, State of Mexico	1	67		
32	Golden Magic	December 5, 2013	IWRG show	Naucalpan, State of Mexico	2	346		
33	Canis Lupus	November 16, 2014	IWRG show	Naucalpan, State of Mexico	2	519	This was a "Mask. vs Title" match.	
—	Vacated	April 18, 2016	—	—	—	—	IWRG announced a tournament for the championship, but did not explain why Canis Lupus was not defending the championship	
34	Cerebro Negro	April 20, 2016	IWRG show	Naucalpan, State of Mexico	6	291	Defeated Mike Segura in the finals of a tournament for the vacant championship.	
35	La Mosca	February 5, 2017	IWRG show	Naucalpan, State of Mexico	1	133		
36	Emperador Azteca	June 18, 2017	IWRG show	Naucalpan, State of Mexico	1	371		
37	Cerebro Negro	June 24, 2018	IWRG show	Naucalpan, State of Mexico	7	1,246		
38	Jessy Ventura	November 21, 2021	Mas Lucha Torneo Suprema Mas Luchas	Naucalpan, State of Mexico	1	399		
39	Tonalli	December 25, 2022	IWRG Ruleta De La Murte	Naucalpan, State of Mexico	1	372		
40	Dr. Cerebro Jr.	January 1, 2024	IWRG Guerreros De Acero 2024	Naucalpan, State of Mexico	1	1,054+		

== Combined reigns ==
†	Indicates the current champion

Rank	Wrestler	No. of reigns	Combined days
1	Cerebro Negro	7	1,698
2	Dr. Cerebro	4	1,138
3	Avisman	2	784
4	Fuerza Guerrera	2	654
5	Shiima Nobunaga / CIMA	2	623
6	Canis Lupus	2	587
7	Golden Magic	2	451
8	Dr. Cerebro Jr. †	1	1,054+
9	Jessy Ventura	1	399
10	Tonalli	1	372
11	Emperador Azteca	1	371
12	Fantasma de la Ópera	3	343
13	Último Vampiro	1	340
14	Fantasy	1	301
15	Eterno	1	290
16	Black Terry	3	262
17	Dinamic Black	1	210
17	Panterita/Freelance	1	210
19	Oficial Rayan	1	140
20	Mosca	1	133
21	Multifacético	1	67
22	Ciclón Ramírez	1	45
