= Pirata Morgan Jr. =

Mexican professional wrestler

Personal information
- Born: January 23, 1981 (age 45) Guanajuato, Guanajuato, Mexico

Professional wrestling career
- Ring name: Pirata Morgan Jr.
- Trained by: Pirata Morgan; Hombre Bala
- Debut: June 6, 2000

Pirata Morgan Jr. (born January 23, 1981) is a Mexican professional wrestler who is working for the Mexican professional wrestling promotion International Wrestling Revolution Group (IWRG) portraying a técnico ("Good guy") wrestling character. Pirata Morgan Jr.'s real name is not a matter of public record, as is often the case with masked wrestlers in Mexico where their private lives are kept a secret from the professional wrestling fans. He is the son of professional wrestler Pedro Ortiz Villanueva, better known as Pirata Morgan, and not a fictional family relationship as it sometimes the case in Mexican professional wrestling.

== Personal life ==
The wrestler known under the ring name Pirata Morgan Jr. is the son of Pedro Ortiz Villanueva, who is better known as Pirata Morgan. This reveals Pirata Morgan Jr.'s paternal last name as Ortiz, but his first name and maternal last name have not been revealed. He is the older brother of professional wrestler Hijo de Pirata Morgan and female wrestler Perla Negra ("Black Pearl"). He is the nephew of professional wrestlers Hombre Bala, Verdunga, and La Marquesa, and the cousin of wrestlers Rey Bucanero, Hombre Bala Jr., Corsario, Barba Roja, and India Sioux. In an interview Hijo de Pirata Morgan revealed that his father had three wrestling masks made in 1992, one for his cousin Rey Bucanero, who actually wrestled as "Hijo de Pirata Morgan" at one point, one for his younger brother and one for himself, even though he was still a child.

== Professional wrestling career ==
Pirata Morgan Jr. made his official in-ring wrestling debut in 2000, at the age of 19 after training under both his father, Pirata Morgan, and his uncle Hombre Bala. While his official debut as Pirata Morgan Jr. took place in 2000 it is possible that he worked as a wrestler before then, under a more anonymous ring character that has never been revealed, but that has never been confirmed. His first major opportunity came in late 2007 when he worked for Xtreme Latin American Wrestling (XLAW) as part of their "XLAW XMAS" show in Tulancingo. He competed against Crazy Boy and Brazo de Plata Jr. in a match for the XLAW Junior Heavyweight Championship, a match that was won by Brazo de Plata Jr. as a result of the loss Pirata Morgan Jr. was forced to risk his hair against Crazy Boy in an impromptu lucha de apuestas match between the two. Crazy Boy won and Pirata Morgan Jr. was forced to have his hair shaved. Early in his career Pirata Morgan Jr. wore an eyepatch similar to one worn by his father instead of a traditional wrestling match, which meant that he lost his hair in two subsequent Luchas de Apuestas matches in 2003 and 2005 to Crazy Boy and Mike Segura respectively. In 2005 he began to work for International Wrestling Revolution Group (IWRG) and adopted a more traditional wrestling mask. In IWRG he teamed up with Kaleth and Nemesis (his brother using a different ring name) to form a trio called Los Jinetes de Apocalipsis ("The Horsemen of the Apocalypse") for a number of IWRG shows. He was one of thirty wrestlers in the 2005 Rey del Ring (King of the Ring") tournament, a tournament won by Cerebro Negro.

=== AAA (2007–2008) ===
In 2007 Pirata Morgan introduced a group called Los Piratos to the AAA audience. The group originally consisted of Pirata Morgan Jr. Barba Roja (Kaleth under a new name) and Drake Morgan (Pirata's youngest son under yet another ring name). Pirata Morgan would often team with the group and was billed as their father, even of Barbe Roja who was not a blood relative. In late 2007 Drake Morgan was repackaged as Hijo de Pirata Morgan to reveal that he was indeed the son of Pirata Morgan. Pirata Morgan Jr., Hijo de Pirata Morgan and Barbe Roja continued to work as Los Piratos in the first or second matches of the night, working against young tecnico (wrestlers who portray the "good guys") such as Real Fuerza Aérea. Los Piratas teamed up with Pirata Morgan for the 2008 Reina de Reinas ("Queen of Queens") show, losing to the Real Fuerza Aérea team of Gato Eveready, Aero Star, El Ángel and Pegasso. In late 2008 Barba Roja and El Hijo de Pirata Morgan were both released from AAA and in early 2009 Pirata Morgan and Pirata Morgan Jr. also left AAA, citing their dissatisfaction with the direction of the company and their roles.

=== Independent circuit (2009–present) ===
Following Los Piratos AAA departure they resurfaced in IWRG, where especially Pirata Morgan and Hijo de Pirata Morgan became regulars while Pirata Morgan Jr. and Barbe Roja worked less frequently for IWRG and in general. On December 18, 2010, Pirata Morgan Jr. was one of 21 wrestlers who risked their mask or hair on the outcome of a steel cage match in the main event of a Mexico City wrestling event. Pirata Morgan Jr. escaped the cage, keeping his mask safe while Verdugo lost the match by being the last man in the cage and thus had his hair shaved off. In September 2011 Pirata Morgan Jr. competed in yet another multi-man steel cage match]. The match also included his father as well as his brother Hijo de Pirata Morgan and Barba Roja, Bestia 666, Damián 666, Dr. Wagner Jr., Halloween, El Hijo del Perro Aguayo, Monster Clown, Murder Clown, and Psycho Clown. The match came down to Hijo de Pirata and his father as the last two men in the ring, and Pirata Morgan allowed his son to keep his mask, by electing to have his hair shaved off instead. Pirata Morgan Jr. only made sporadic appearances over the next couple of years, until early 2013 where he teamed up with his father and brother and on February 7, 2013, Los Piratas defeated Los Oficiales (Oficial 911, Oficial AK-47, and Oficial Fierro) to win the Distrito Federal Trios Championship. On March 24, 2013, Los Piratas won the vacant IWRG Intercontinental Trios Championship, winning a four-way match against Los Oficiales (911, AK-47, and Fierro), La Familia de Tijuana (Mosco X-Fly, Super Nova, and Eterno) and Comandos Elite (Rayan, Factor), and Máscara Año 2000 Jr. They lost the title to Los Poderosos (Hombre Sin Miedo, Kendor Jr., and Sobredosis) on November 4, only to regain it a week later. On August 9, 2015, Los Piratas lost the IWRG Intercontinental Trios Championship to La Dinastía de la Muerte (Negro Navarro, Trauma I and Trauma II). During the show Pirata Morgan introduced the newest member of Los Piratas, Barbe Roja Jr. ("Red Beard Jr.").

== Championships and accomplishments ==
- International Wrestling Revolution Group
  - IWRG Intercontinental Trios Championship (2 times) – with Pirata Morgan and Hijo de Pirata Morgan
  - Distrito Federal Trios Championship (1 time) – with Pirata Morgan and Hijo de Pirata Morgan

== Lucha de Apuesta record ==
Winner (wager)	Loser (wager)	Location	Event	Date	Notes
Crazy Boy (mask)	Pirata Morgan Jr. (Championship)	Tulancingo, Hidalgo	XLAW Show	December 16, 2001	(Note: Triangle match that also included Brazo de Plata Jr. and was also for the X–LAW Junior Heavyweight Championship.) (Note: At the time Pirata Morgan Jr. wore a mask that was more of an eyepatch and thus bet his hair instead of his mask.)
Crazy Boy (mask)	Pirata Morgan Jr. (hair)	Tulancingo, Hidalgo	Live event	June 8, 2003	
Mike Segura (hair)	Pirata Morgan Jr. (hair)	Naucalpan, Mexico State	IWRG show	December 25, 2005	
Imposible (mask)	Pirata Morgan Jr. (mask)	Naucalpan, Mexico State	Prisión Fatal	January 1, 2017	
