= Dinamic Black =

Mexican professional wrestler

Personal information
- Born: Unrevealed; June 25, 1992 (age 34) Mexico
- Website: Dinamic Black on Facebook

Professional wrestling career
- Ring name: Dinamic Black
- Trained by: Arkangel de la Muerte; Black Terry; Bombero Infernal; El Hijo del Gladiador
- Debut: 2007

Dinamic Black (born June 25, 1992) is a Mexican professional wrestler, currently working for the Mexican promotion International Wrestling Revolution Group (IWRG) portraying a tecnico ("Good guy") wrestling character. Dinamic Black's real name is not a matter of public record, as is often the case with masked wrestlers in Mexico where their private lives are kept a secret from the wrestling fans.

== Professional wrestling career ==
The wrestler known under the ring name Dinamic Black made his debut in 2007, starting his career at the age of 15 working as a masked wrestler, which also meant he only revealed a limited amount of personal information. At one point he trained in Guadalajara, Jalisco in Consejo Mundial de Lucha Libre's (CMLL) wrestling school under Arkangel de la Muerte and El Hijo del Gladiador, but never officially worked for CMLL. He would later receive additional training from Black Terry and Bombero Infernal in the International Wrestling Revolution Group's training school known as Futuro Idolos de Lucha Libre (FILL; "Future Idols of Wrestling"). Dinamic Black began working on IWRG shows regularly in late 2009, including wrestling in a Torneo Novatos ("Rookie tournament"), a torneo cibernetico, multi-man elimination match that also include such wrestlers as El Hijo del Signo, Alan Extreme and Fénix and was won by Gringo Loco. In early 2010 the rookie Dinamic Black was teamed up with veteran wrestler Chico Che for the 2010 Torneo Relampago de Proyeccion a Nuevas Promesas de la Lucha Libre (Spanish for "Projecting a new promise lightning tournament"), the first tournament of its kind held by IWRG. The duo defeated Alan Extreme and Black Terry in the first round, but were defeated by eventual tournament winners Comando Negro and Oficial 911 in the semi-finals. On February 4, 2010 Dinamic Black was on the losing side of an FILL Copa Higher Power match that was won by Dr. Cerebro, El Hijo del Pantera and Trauma I. In late 2010 Dinamic Black competed in his first ever Luchas de Apuestas, or bet match where each competitor "bets" their mask or hair on the outcome of the match. The match was an International Wrestling League (IWL) promoted 11 man Steel Cage match where the last man in the cage would either be forced to unmask or have his hair shaved off. Dinamic Black escaped about halfway through to keep his mask safe; Cerebro Negro lost the match and was shaved bald afterwards. On December 21, 2010 Dinamic Black won a Copa Higher Power tournament, outlasting other young wrestlers to win the trophy. Dinamic Black participated in the second annual Torneo Relampago de Proyeccion a Nuevas Promesas de la Lucha Libre tournament, teaming up with veteran Negro Navarro for the occasion. The team defeated Hammer and El Hijo de Pirata Morgan in the first round, but lost to eventual tournament winners Comando Negro and Scorpio, Jr. in the next round. Somewhere around 2010/2011 Dinamic Black became a regular competitor for IWRG, not just a "student", which meant participating in several of the major IWRG events of the year, such as the IWRG Rey del Ring tournament on June 16, 2011, a tournament won by Pantera and where Dinamic Black was the 12th person eliminated. A few months later he participated in a tournament to find a new IWRG Intercontinental Welterweight Champion, but was eliminated before the finals, the tournament was eventually won by Carta Brava, Jr. He later earned a match for the IWL International Junior Heavyweight Championship when he defeated Black Fire, Daga, Eterno, Fantasma de la Opera, Flamita, Konami, Low Rider and Peligro on an IWL show in Huamantla, Tlaxcala, Mexiko. On November 3, 2011 Dinamic Black won his first ever wrestling championship as he defeated Comando Negro to win the IWRG Intercontinental Lightweight Championship. The match was one of the feature match ups on the undercard of the 2011 El Castillo del Terror show. He held the championship for a total of 49 days, until December 22, 2011 where he lost the championship to Carta Brava, Jr. as part of IWRG's Arena Naucalpan 34th Anniversary Show. In 2012 IWRG decided to rename the Proyeccion a Nuevas Promesas to El Protector, but kept the concept the same. Dinamic Black teamed up with Angelico, but lost to Centvrión and Negro Navarro in the first round. On May 31, 2012 he was one of 30 competitors in the 2012 Rey del Ring tournament. He was one of the first wrestlers in the ring and was eliminated early on in the tournament, Oficial Factor would go on to win the Rey del Ring tournament. In November 2012 Dinamic Black participated in a tournament for the World Wrestling Stars (WWS) Welterweight Championship, a championship promoted by IWRG that had been vacated when the previous champion left the promotion. Dinamic Black was defeated by eventual tournament winner Cerebro Negro in the first round. He would later unsuccessfully challenge Cerebro Negro for the WWS Welterweight Championship. On March 24, 2013 Dinamic Black defeated Rayan to win the IWRG Intercontinental Welterweight Championship in a best two-out-of-three falls match. Less than a month later he successfully defended the championship against official challenger, and frequent rival, Carta Brava, Jr. in the semi-main event of the 2013 Prison Fatal show. The match between the two was so well received by the audience that they threw money into the ring, which is a tradition in Mexico to show their appreciation for a good match. On March 21, 2013 Dinamic Black successfully defended the Welterweight championship against the AAA Fusión Champion Fénix, making it the second title defense in less than one week. On May 5, 2013 Dinamic Black defeated Carta Brava, Jr. to win the WWS World Welterweight Championship, making him a double champion.

== Championships and accomplishments ==
- International Wrestling League

- IWL International Tag Team Championship (1 time, current) - with Fresero, Jr.

- International Wrestling Revolution Group
  - IWRG Intercontinental Welterweight Championship (1 time)
  - IWRG Intercontinental Lightweight Championship (1 time)
  - IWRG Rey del Ring Championship (1 time)
  - WWS World Welterweight Championship (1 time)
  - Copa Higher Power

== Lucha de Apuestas record ==
Winner (wager)	Loser (wager)	Location	Event	Date	Notes
Mask	Dinamic Black	Guerrero WMC	Tlalnepantla de Baz, Mexico State	December 13, 2014	
