= Distrito Federal Trios Championship =

Professional wrestling championship by International Wrestling Revolution Group

Details
- Promotion: International Wrestling Revolution Group; Mexican Independent Circuit
- Date established: 1986
- Current champions: Demonio Infernal, Eterno, and Lunatic Xtreme
- Date won: February 3, 2019

Other name
- Mexico State Trios Championship/Campeonato Trios de Estado de Mexico
Statistics
- First champions: Los Temerarios (Black Terry, Jose Luis Feliciano, Shu el Guerrero)
- Most reigns: Individual: Oficial (5 reigns); Team: Los Oficiales (3 reigns) (Guardia, Oficial and Virgilante)
- Longest reign: Los Oficiales (507 days) (Note: Longest verified reign)
- Shortest reign: Los Divos (21 days) (Bengalí, Cats and Raiden) (Note: Shortest verified reign)

The Distrito Federal Trios Championship is a Trios (six-man) tag team Championship primarily promoted by the Mexican Lucha libre professional wrestling promotion International Wrestling Revolution Group (IWRG). The title was created in 1986 and is controlled by the "Comisión de Box y Lucha Libre Mexico D.F." (Mexico City Boxing and Wrestling Commission), which regulates all matches where the title is defended, allowing it to only be defended in Mexico City and the State of Mexico. It is considered a secondary, lower level championship than the Mexican National Trios Championship also sanctioned by the Commission but almost exclusively controlled by Consejo Mundial de Lucha Libre (CMLL). IWRG has held the control of the Distrito Federal Trios Championship since IWRG was founded in 1996 and has at times been a secondary title for the promotion, below the IWRG Intercontinental Trios Championship. (Note: In this, "control" refers to the every day use of the title, determining which storylines the title is being used it, who gets to challenge for the title, how to use it in a public relations sense.) The championship is not restricted by nationality, only by geographical location of where it can or cannot be defended.

The current champions are Demonio Infernal, Eterno, and Lunatic Xtreme who became champions on February 3, 2019 by defeating Los Comandos Elite (Oficial Rayan, Oficial Spector and Oficial Liderk). The first Distrito Federal Champions was the team known as Los Temerarios ("The Reckless"; Black Terry, Jose Luis Feliciano, Shu el Guerrero) who won the championship at some point in 1986. Due to very few paper records being preserved of professional wrestling events, especially on the independent circuit there are periods of time where the status of the championship is unclear. At times there is no record of the specific date a team won the championship or who they defeated, leaving the possibility that there may have been other championship reigns in that period of time. Due to the fictional nature of professional wrestling, it is also possible that some of the championship changes that proceeded periods of uncertainty were fictional in nature, where new champions were announced but no actual match took place. In the years preceding Los Oficiales winning the championship in 2007 the title was inactive for long periods of time and was not defended on a regular basis.

Due to the gaps in records, it can only be stated that there have been at least 39 championship reigns between 34 different trios and 83 individual wrestlers. The first version of Los Oficiales (Guardia, Oficial, and Virgilante) is the trio with the most reigns as a team, three; while Oficial is the individual with the most reigns, holding the championship with three different configurations of Los Oficiales. The longest reigning Trio is the current version of Los Oficiales, whose reign from July 19, 2007, to December 7, 2008, was the longest with 507 days in total. Technically the 31st reign by Gringos VIP lasted 679 days, but during the trio's reign the Commission allowed Gringo Loco to be replaced by Apolo Estrada, Jr. as Gringo Loco had returned to the United States of America about halfway through their reign, making Los Oficiales the longest reigning trio. The current version of Los Oficiales is also the team with the longest combined, confirmed championship reign at 5,587 days and counting. Oficial AK-47 has the longest combined reign for an individual, combining four reigns to 5,749 days and counting. The Nuevo León based trio of Los Divos (Bengalí, Cats, and Raiden) held the championship for 21 days in 2005, making it the shortest confirmed reign of any champions. Four wrestlers have been champions under two different wrestling identities; Black Terry has held the title twice under that name and once as the masked character Guerrero Maya. Oficial AK-47 has held it both under his current character and as "Ultra Mega" as well, Oficial Factor previously held the championship under his former identity of Mega as well while Oficial Spartan also held the championship under the name Omega. (Note: The statistics are supported by all the sources in the championship list.)

As it is a professional wrestling championship, the championship was not won not by actual competition, but by a scripted ending to a match determined by the bookers and match makers. (Note: Hornbaker (2016) p. 550: "Professional wrestling is a sport in which match finishes are predetermined. Thus, win–loss records are not indicative of a wrestler's genuine success based on their legitimate abilities – but on now much, or how little they were pushed by promoters") On occasion the promotion declares a championship vacant, which means there is no champion at that point in time. This can either be due to a storyline, (Note: Duncan & Will (2000) p. 271, Chapter: Texas: NWA American Tag Team Title [World Class, Adkisson] "Championship held up and rematch ordered because of the interference of manager Gary Hart") or real life issues such as a champion suffering an injury being unable to defend the championship, (Note: Duncan & Will (2000) p. 20, Chapter: (United States: 19th Century & widely defended titles – NWA, WWF, AWA, IW, ECW, NWA) NWA/WCW TV Title "Rhodes stripped on 85/10/19 for not defending the belt after having his leg broken by Ric Flair and Ole & Arn Anderson") or leaving the company. (Note: Duncan & Will (2000) p. 201, Chapter: (Memphis, Nashville) Memphis: USWA Tag Team Title "Vacant on 93/01/18 when Spike leaves the USWA.")

== Championship tournaments ==
It is believed that the original champions Los Temerarios (Black Terry, Jose Luis Feliciano, Shu el Guerrero) won a trios tournament of indeterminate size, but no documentation of the date or participants of the tournament exists.

=== Distrito Federal Trios Tournament, 2010 ===
In April 2010 IWRG stripped Los Terribles Cerebros (Black Terry, Cerebro Negro and Dr. Cerebro) of the championship due to Cerebro Negro electing to work a Desastre Total Ultraviolento (DTU) on the same day as an IWRG show, forcing IWRG to abandon the planned match. IWRG held an eight-team, one night single elimination tournament from April 15 to April 29, 2010 to crown the new champions. Cerebro Negro actually participated in the tournament, but did not team with his former partners Black Terry and Dr. Cerebro.

Quarterfinals
Team Máscara Año 2000s (Máscara Año 2000, Hijo de Máscara Año 2000 and Máscara Año 2000, Jr.)	W
Chico Che, Ultraman, Jr. and Zatura
Los Brazos (Brazo de Plata, Brazo Metálico and Hijo del Brazo de Plata)	W
Bombero Infernal, Maldito, Jr. and Samoth
Black Terry, Dr. Cerebro and El Hijo del Signo	W
La Dinastia de la Muerte (Negro Navarro, Trauma I and Trauma II)
Cerebro Negro, Kaos and Veneno
Gringos VIP (Avisman, El Hijo del Diablo and Gringo Loco)	W

Semifinals
Team Máscara Año 2000s (Máscara Año 2000, Hijo de Máscara Año 2000 and Máscara Año 2000, Jr.)	W
Los Brazos (Brazo de Plata, Brazo Metálico and Hijo del Brazo de Plata)
Black Terry, Dr. Cerebro and El Hijo del Signo
Gringos VIP (Avisman, El Hijo del Diablo and Gringo Loco)	W

Final
Team Máscara Año 2000s (Máscara Año 2000, Hijo de Máscara Año 2000 and Máscara Año 2000, Jr.)
Gringos VIP (Avisman, El Hijo del Diablo and Gringo Loco)	W

== Title history ==
Key
No.	Overall reign number
Reign	Reign number for the specific team—reign numbers for the individuals are in parentheses, if different
Days	Number of days held
N/A	Unknown information
(NLT)	Championship change took place "no later than" the date listed
†	Championship change is unrecognized by the promotion
+	Current reign is changing daily

No.	Champion	Championship change			Reign statistics		Notes	Ref.
No.	Champion	Date	Event	Location	Reign	Days	Notes	Ref.
1	Los Temerarios (Black Terry, Jose Luis Feliciano, Shu el Guerrero)	1986	Live event	Naucalpan, State of Mexico	1	(Note: The exact date on which the Championship was first won is unknown, which means that the title reign lasted between 238 and 602 days.)	It has not been documented how Los Temerarios won the championship.	
2	Yoshihiro Asai, Hirokazu Hata and Naoki Sano	August 26, 1987	Live event	Naucalpan, State of Mexico	1	(Note: The exact date on which Asai, Hirokazu and Sano lost the championship is unknown, which means that the title reign lasted between 1 and 1,342 days.)		
Championship history is unrecorded from 1987 to 1991.
3	Los Tarascos (Tarasco I, II, and III)	N/A	Live event	Naucalpan, State of Mexico	1	(Note: The exact date on which Los Tarascos won and lost the championship is unknown, which means that the title reign lasted between 1 and 1,342 days.)	It is not clear if the team defeated Asai, Horikazu and Sano to win the championship or a different team.	
4	Las Saetas del Ring (Águila Solitaria, Ciclón Ramírez, and El Pantera II)	April 1991	Live event	Naucalpan, State of Mexico	1	(Note: The exact date on which Los Saetas del Ring won and lost the championship is unknown, which means that the title reign lasted between 1 and 274 days.)		
Championship history is unrecorded from 1991 to 1991.
5	Los Metálicos (Oro, Plata, and Bronce)	1991	Live event	Naucalpan, State of Mexico	1	(Note: The exact date on which Los Metálicos won and lost the championship is unknown, which means that the title reign lasted between 1 and 639 days.)	It is not clear if the team defeated Los Saetas del Ring to win the championship or a different team.	
6	Los Guerreros del Futuro (Damain El Guerrero, Guerrero Del Futuro, and Guerrero Maya (2))	1992	Live event	Naucalpan, State of Mexico	1	(Note: The exact date on which Los Guerreros del Futuro won and lost the championship is unknown, which means that the title reign lasted between 0 and 1,399 days.)	Guerrero Maya previously held the title under the ring name Black Terry.	
Championship history is unrecorded from 1992 to 1995.
7	Ciclón Ramírez (2), El Nuevo Huracán Ramírez, Jr. and El Hijo de Huracán Ramírez	N/A	Live event	Naucalpan, State of Mexico	1	(Note: The exact date on which the team won and lost the championship is unknown, which means that the title reign lasted between 0 and 1,398 days.)	It is not clear if the team defeated Los Guerreros del Futuro to win the championship or a different team.	
8	Los Destructores (Rocco Valente, Tony Arce, and Vulcano)	October 1995	Live event	Naucalpan, State of Mexico	1	(Note: The exact date on which Los Destructores won and lost the championship is unknown, which means that the title reign lasted between 1 and 457 days.)		
Championship history is unrecorded from October 1995 to 1996.
9	Los Oficiales (Version 1; Maniac Cop, Oficial, and Virgilante)	1996	Live event	Naucalpan, State of Mexico	1	(Note: The exact date on which Los Destructores won and lost the championship is unknown, which means that the title reign lasted between 1 and 730 days.)	It is not clear if the team defeated Los Destructores to win the championship or a different team.	
10	Los Super Payasos (Bruly, Circus, and Rody)	1997	Live event	Naucalpan, State of Mexico	1	(Note: The exact date on which Los Destructores won the championship is unknown, which means that the title reign lasted between 1 and 346 days.)		
11	Judo Suwa, Shiima Nobunaga, and Sumo Fuji	December 14, 1997	Live event	Naucalpan, State of Mexico	1	287		
12	Los Oficiales (Version 1; Guardia, Oficial (2) and Virgilante (2))	September 27, 1998	Live event	Naucalpan, State of Mexico	1	(Note: The exact date on which Los Oficiales lost the championship is unknown, which means that the title reign lasted between 96 and 460 days.)		
13	Los Super Payasos (Bruly, Circus, and Rody)	1999	Live event	Naucalpan, State of Mexico	2	(Note: The exact date on which Los Super Payasos won and lost the championship is unknown, which means that the title reign lasted between 1 and 537 days.)		
14	Los Oficiales (Version 1; Guardia (2), Oficial (3) and Virgilante (3))	2000	Live event	Naucalpan, State of Mexico	2	(Note: The exact date on which Los Oficiales won the championship is unknown, which means that the title reign lasted between 367 and 537 days.)		
15	Super Caló, Alan Stone, and Moto Cross	June 22, 2000	Live event	Naucalpan, State of Mexico	1	98		
16	Bombero Infernal, Cripta, and El Enterrador	September 28, 2000	Live event	Naucalpan, State of Mexico	1	136		
17	Los Oficiales (Version 1; Guardia (3), Oficial (4) and Virgilante (4))	February 11, 2001	Live event	Naucalpan, State of Mexico	3	172		
18	Los Megas (Mega, Super Mega, and Ultra Mega)	August 2, 2001	Live event	Naucalpan, State of Mexico	1	161		
19	Dr. Cerebro, Cirujano, and Paramedico	January 10, 2002	Live event	Naucalpan, State of Mexico	1	304		
20	Bombero Infernal (2), El Engendro, and El Hijo del Diablo	November 10, 2002	Live event	Naucalpan, State of Mexico	1	(Note: The exact date on which the team lost won the championship is unknown, which means that the title reign lasted between 1 and 51 days.)		
21	Los Megas (Mega (2), Omega, and Ultra Mega (2))	2002	Live event	Naucalpan, State of Mexico	1	(Note: The exact date on which Los Megas won the championship is unknown, which means that the title reign lasted between 347 and 397 days.)		
22	Dr. Markus, Dr. Muerte, and Enfermero, Jr.	December 13, 2003	Live event	Xochimilco	1	162		
23	Los Oficiales (Version 2; Cyborg, Guardia (4), and Oficial (5))	May 23, 2004	Live event	Naucalpan, State of Mexico	1	193		
24	Los Payasos Tricolores (Coco Blanco, Coco Rojo, and Coco Verde)	December 2, 2004	Live event	Naucalpan, State of Mexico	1	122		
25	Jungla Negra Jr. and Los Orientales (Orientale I and Orientale II)	April 3, 2005	Live event	Nuevo León	1	28	The geographical restriction was ignored by Los Payasos when they agreed to defend the championship.	
26	Los Divos (Bengalí, Cats, and Raiden)	May 1, 2005	Live event	Nuevo León	1	21	The geographical restriction was ignored by the local promoters.	
27	Los Payasos Tricolores (Coco Blanco, Coco Rojo, and Coco Verde)	May 22, 2005	Live event	Nuevo León	2	140	Los Payasos regained the championship to return to Mexico State with them.	
28	Dr. Cerebro, Cerebro Negro, and Veneno	May 22, 2005	Live event	Naucalpan, State of Mexico	1	(Note: The exact date on which Los Megas won the championship is unknown, which means that the title reign lasted between 1 and 787 days.)		
Championship history is unrecorded from 2005 to 2007.
29	Los Oficiales (Version 5; Oficial 911, Oficial AK-47 (3), and Oficial Fierro)	July 19, 2007	Live event	Naucalpan, State of Mexico	1	507	Defeated the team of Kai, Sasaki, Yamato to win championship, unclear if it was a tournament for the vacant championship.	
30	Los Terribles Cerebros (Black Terry (3), Dr. Cerebro (3), and Cerebro Negro (2))	December 7, 2008	Live event	Naucalpan, State of Mexico	1	489		
—	Vacated	April 10, 2010	—	—	—	—	Championship vacated when Cerebro Negro temporarily stopped working for IWRG.	
31	Gringos VIP (Avisman, El Hijo del Diablo (2), and Gringo Loco)	April 29, 2010	Live event	Naucalpan, State of Mexico	1	679	Won an eight-team tournament, defeating the team of Máscara Año 2000, Hijo de Máscara Año 2000 and Máscara Año 2000, Jr. in the finals.	
31.5	Gringos VIP (Avisman, El Hijo del Diablo (2), and Apolo Estrada Jr.)	April 29, 2010	Live event	Naucalpan, State of Mexico	1	679	The commission allows Apolo Estrada Jr. to replace Gringo Loco on the team.	
32	Los Oficiales Elite (Oficial Factor (3), Oficial Rayan, and Oficial Spartan (2))	March 8, 2012	Live event	Naucalpan, State of Mexico	1	140		
33	Los Oficiales (Version 5; Oficial 911, Oficial AK-47 (4), and Oficial Fierro)	July 26, 2012	Live event	Naucalpan, State of Mexico	2	196		
34	Los Piratas (El Hijo de Pirata Morgan, Pirata Morgan, and Pirata Morgan, Jr.)	February 7, 2013	Live event	Naucalpan, State of Mexico	2	214		
35	Gringos VIP (Avisman, El Hijo del Diablo (3), and Apolo Estrada Jr.)	September 9, 2013	Live event	Naucalpan, State of Mexico	2	643		
36	Los Terribles Cerebros (Black Terry (4), Dr. Cerebro (4), and Cerebro Negro (3))	June 14, 2015	Live event	Naucalpan, State of Mexico	2	231		
37	Los Mariachis Locos (El Hijo del Diablo (4), El Diablo Jr., and Imposible)	January 31, 2016	El Protector (2016)	Naucalpan, State of Mexico	1	91		
38	Las Tortugas Ninja (Leo, Mike, and Rafy)	May 1, 2016	IWRG house show	Naucalpan, State of Mexico	1	297		
39	Los Exóticos (Diva Salvaje, Demasiado, and Nigma)	February 22, 2017	IWRG Zona XXI	Naucalpan, State of Mexico	1	46		
40	Los Mariachis Locos (El Hijo del Diablo (5), El Diablo Jr., and Imposible)	April 9, 2017	IWRG Zona XXI	Naucalpan, State of Mexico	2	210		
41	Los Dinamics Dragóns (Dinamic Black, Dragón Fly, and Black Dragón)	November 5, 2017	IWRG Zona XXI	Naucalpan, State of Mexico	1	35		
42	Los Comandos Elite (Oficial Rayan (2), Oficial Spector, and Oficial Liderk)	December 10, 2017	IWRG Zona XXI	Naucalpan, State of Mexico	1	420		
43	El Infierno Eterno (Demonio Infernal, Eterno, and Lunatic Xtreme)	February 3, 2019	IWRG Show	Naucalpan, State of Mexico	1	2,697+		

== Combined reigns ==
As of June 23, 2026.

=== By team ===
†	Indicates the current champion
¤	Indicates that one or more of the title reigns does not have a definite start or end date and thus is not counted into the total length

Rank	Team	No. of reigns	Combined days
1	Gringos VIP (Avisman, El Hijo del Diablo and Apolo Estrada, Jr.)	1.5	983
2	Los Oficials (Version 5, Oficial 911, Oficial AK-47 and Oficial Fierro)	2	703
3	Los Terribles Cerebros (Black Terry, Dr. Cerebro and Cerebro Negro)	2	721
4	Demonio Infernal, Eterno, and Lunatic Xtreme †	1	2,697+
5	Los Comandos Elite (Oficial Rayan (2), Oficial Spector and Oficial Liderk)	1	420
6	Gringos VIP (Avisman, El Hijo del Diablo and Gringo Loco)	0.5	340
7	Dr. Cerebro, Cirujano and Paramedico	1	304
8	Los Mariachis Locos (El Hijo del Diablo, El Diablo Jr. I and Imposible)	2	301
9	Las Tortugas Ninja (Leo, Mike and Rafy)	1	292
10	Judo Suwa, Shiima Nobunaga and Sumo Fuji	1	287
11	Los Payasos Tricolores (Coco Blanco, Coco Rojo, Coco Verde)	2	262
12	Los Piratas (El Hijo de Pirata Morgan, Pirata Morgan and Pirata Morgan, Jr.)	1	214
13	Los Oficiales (Version 2; Cyborg, Guardia and Oficial)	1	193
14	Los Oficiales (Version 1; Guardia, Oficial and Virgilante)	3	174¤
15	Dr. Markus, Dr. Muerte and Enfermero, Jr.	1	162
16	Los Megas (Mega, Super Mega and Ultra Mega)	1	161
17	Los Oficiales Elite (Oficial Factor, Oficial Rayan and Oficial Spartan)	1	140
18	Bombero Infernal, Cripta, El Enterrador	1	136
19	Super Caló, Alan Stone and Moto Cross	1	98
20	Los Exóticos (Diva Salvaje, Demasiado, and Nigma)	1	46
21	Los Dinamics Dragóns (Dinamic Black, Dragón Fly, and Black Dragón)	1	35
22	Jungla Negra Jr. and Los Orientales (Orientale I and Orientale II)	1	28
23	Los Divos (Bengalí, Cats, and Raiden)	1	21
¤	Los Super Payasos (Bruly, Circus, and Rody)	2	
¤	Bombero Infernal, El Engendro, and El Hijo del Diablo	1	
¤	Ciclón Ramírez, El Nuevo Huracán Ramírez, Jr., and El Hijo de Huracán Ramírez	1	
¤	Dr. Cerebro, Cerebro Negro, and Veneno	1	
¤	Los Destructores (Rocco Valente, Tony Arce, and Vulcano)	1	
¤	Los Metálicos (Oro, Plata, and Bronce)	1	
¤	Los Oficiales (Version 1; Maniac Cop, Oficial, and Virgilante)	1	
¤	Yoshihiro Asai, Hata Hirokazu, and Naoki Sano	1	
¤	Las Saetas del Ring (Águila Solitaria, Ciclón Ramírez, and El Pantera II)	1	
¤	Los Guerreros del Futuro (Damain El Guerrero, Guerrero Del Futuro, and Guerrero Maya)	1	
¤	Los Megas (Mega, Omega, and Ultra Mega)	1	
¤	Los Tarascos(Tarasco I, II, and III)	1	
¤	Los Temerarios (Black Terry, Jose Luis Feliciano, and Shu el Guerrero)	1	

=== By individual ===
Rank	Wrestler	# of reigns	Combined days
1	El Hijo del Diablo	5	1624¤
2	Avisman	2.5	1,322
3	Dr. Cerebro	4	1,025¤
4	Apolo Estrada, Jr.	0.5	983
5	Ultra Mega / Oficial AK-47	4	865¤
6	Black Terry / Guerrero Maya	4	721¤
7	Cerebro Negro	3	720¤
8	Oficial 911	2	703
9	Oficial Fierro	1	703
10	Demonio Infernal †	1	2,697+
10	Eterno †	1	2,697+
10	Lunatic Xtreme †	1	2,697+
13	Guardia	4	367¤
14	Oficial	5	368¤
15	Gringo Loco	0.5	340
16	Cirujano	1	304
17	Paramedico	1	304
18	Mega / Oficial Factor	3	302¤
19	Imposible	2	301
19	El Diablo Jr. I	2	301
21	Tortuga Leo	1	292
21	Tortuga Mike	1	292
21	Tortuga Rafy	1	292
24	Judo Suwa	1	287
24	Shiima Nobunaga	1	287
24	Sumo Fuji	1	287
27	Coco Blanco	2	262
27	Coco Rojo	2	262
27	Coco Verde	2	262
30	El Hijo de Pirata Morgan	1	214
30	Pirata Morgan	1	214
30	Pirata Morgan, Jr.	1	214
33	Cyborg	1	193
34	Oficial Fierro	1	186
35	Virgilante	4	175¤
36	Dr. Markus	1	162
36	Dr. Muerte	1	162
36	Enfermero Jr.	1	162
39	Super Mega	1	161
40	Omega / Oficial Spartan	2	141¤
41	Oficial Rayan	1	140
42	Bombero Infernal	2	137¤
43	Cripta	1	136
43	El Enterrador	1	136
45	Alan Stone	1	98
45	Moto Cross	1	98
45	Super Caló	1	98
48	Diva Salvaje	1	46
48	Demasiado	1	46
48	Nigma	1	46
51	Jungla Negra, Jr.	1	28
52	Dinamic Black	1	35
52	Dragón Fly	1	35
52	Black Dragón	1	35
55	Orientale I	1	28
55	Orientale II	1	28
57	Bengalí	1	21
57	Cats	1	21
57	Raiden	1	21
¤	Ciclón Ramírez	2	
¤	Bruly	2	
¤	Circus	2	
¤	Rody	2	
¤	Águila Solitaria	1	
¤	Bronce	1	
¤	Damain El Guerrero	1	
¤	Guerrero Del Futuro	1	
¤	Hata Hirokazu	1	
¤	Jose Luis Feliciano	1	
¤	Plata	1	
¤	Naoki Sano	1	
¤	Oro	1	
¤	El Pantera II	1	
¤	Shu el Guerrero	1	
¤	Yoshihiro Asai	1	
¤	Veneno	1	
¤	El Engendro	1	
¤	El Hijo de Huracán Ramírez	1	
¤	El Nuevo Huracán Ramírez, Jr.	1	
¤	Maniac Cop	1	
¤	Rocco Valente	1	
¤	Tarasco I	1	
¤	Tarasco II	1	
¤	Tarasco III	1	
¤	Tony Arce	1	
¤	Vulcano	1	
