= IWRG Intercontinental Lightweight Championship =

Professional wrestling championship by International Wrestling Revolution Group

- The championship belt

Details
- Promotion: International Wrestling Revolution Group
- Date established: May 29, 2008
- Current champion: Aguila Oriental
- Date won: May 24, 2026
Statistics
- First champion: Freelance
- Most reigns: Tetsuya/Tetsuya Bushi (2 reigns)
- Longest reign: Imposible (1,142 days)
- Shortest reign: Tetsuya Bushi (35 days)

The IWRG Intercontinental Lightweight Championship is a singles professional wrestling championship promoted by International Wrestling Revolution Group (IWRG) since May 2008. The official definition of the Lightweight class in Mexico is between 70 kg (150 lb) and 77 kg (170 lb), but are not always strictly enforced. (Note: One example the weightlimits not being strictly enforced is Mephisto winning the CMLL World Welterweight Championship, a championship with a 78 kg (172 lb) upper limit despite weighing 90 kg (200 lb).)

The Lightweight Championship is considered a secondary championship in IWRG, with the IWRG Intercontinental Heavyweight Championship being considered the primary championship of the promotion. Aguila Oriental is the current champion, having defeated Aguila Roja on May 24, 2026 at an IWRG show. Oriental is the 20th overall champion and the 19th person to have held the championship. The Lightweight Championship was first won by Freelance in Naucalpan, Mexico when he won a 10-man elimination match. The championship has only changed hands in Arena Naucalpan on IWRG promoted shows. Only Tetsuya/Tetsuya Bushi has held the title twice, he is also the person with the shortest reign, 35 days, while Impossible has the record for the longest reign so far, 1,142 days in total.

As it is a professional wrestling championship, the championship was not won not by actual competition, but by a scripted ending to a match determined by the bookers and match makers. (Note: Hornbaker (2016) p. 550: "Professional wrestling is a sport in which match finishes are predetermined. Thus, win–loss records are not indicative of a wrestler's genuine success based on their legitimate abilities – but on now much, or how little they were pushed by promoters") On occasion the promotion declares a championship vacant, which means there is no champion at that point in time. This can either be due to a storyline, (Note: Duncan & Will (2000) p. 271, Chapter: Texas: NWA American Tag Team Title [World Class, Adkisson] "Championship held up and rematch ordered because of the interference of manager Gary Hart") or real life issues such as a champion suffering an injury being unable to defend the championship, (Note: Duncan & Will (2000) p. 20, Chapter: (United States: 19th Century & widely defended titles – NWA, WWF, AWA, IW, ECW, NWA) NWA/WCW TV Title "Rhodes stripped on 85/10/19 for not defending the belt after having his leg broken by Ric Flair and Ole & Arn Anderson") or leaving the company. (Note: Duncan & Will (2000) p. 201, Chapter: (Memphis, Nashville) Memphis: USWA Tag Team Title "Vacant on 93/01/18 when Spike leaves the USWA.")

== Tournaments ==
=== November 2016 ===
First round
Astro	W
Black Dragon
Pantera I	W
Demonio Infernal
Diablo Jr.	W
Omega
Dragón Fly	W
Cadillac

Semi-finals
Astro
Pantera I	W
Diablo Jr.	W
Dragón Fly

Final
Pantera I	W
Diablo Jr.

== Title history ==
Key
No.	Overall reign number
Reign	Reign number for the specific team—reign numbers for the individuals are in parentheses, if different
Days	Number of days held
+	Current reign is changing daily

No.	Champion	Championship change			Reign statistics		Notes	Ref.
No.	Champion	Date	Event	Location	Reign	Days	Notes	Ref.
1	Freelance	May 29, 2008	Caravana de Campeones	Naucalpan, State of Mexico	1	255	Defeated Areoman as the last man in a 10-man elimination match.	
2	Tetsuya	February 8, 2009	Revolucionarios de IWRG	Naucalpan, State of Mexico	1	35	Defeated Freelance and Dr. Cerebro in 3-way match.	
3	Zatura	March 13, 2009	Caravana de Campeones	Naucalpan, State of Mexico	1	95		
4	Trauma II	June 18, 2009	Revolucionarios de IWRG	Naucalpan, State of Mexico	1	59		
5	Avisman	August 16, 2009	Guerra Revolucionaria	Naucalpan, State of Mexico	1	102		
6	Tetsuya Bushi	November 26, 2009	IWRG Homenaje a El Pantera	Naucalpan, State of Mexico	2	45		
7	Dr. Cerebro	January 10, 2010	Revolucionarios de IWRG	Naucalpan, State of Mexico	1	385		
8	Comando Negro	January 30, 2011	Caravana de Campeones	Naucalpan, State of Mexico	1	277		
9	Dinamic Black	November 3, 2011	El Castillo del Terror	Naucalpan, State of Mexico	1	49		
10	Carta Brava Jr.	December 22, 2011	Arena Naucalpan 34th Anniversary Show	Naucalpan, State of Mexico	1	192		
11	Chicano	July 1, 2012	IWRG show	Naucalpan, State of Mexico	1	365		
12	Imposible	July 7, 2013	IWRG show	Naucalpan, State of Mexico	1	1,142		
—	Vacated	August 22, 2016	IWRG show	Naucalpan, State of Mexico	—	—	Imposible declared that he was moving up to the middleweight division	
13	Pantera I	November 13, 2016	IWRG show	Naucalpan, State of Mexico	1	630	Defeated Diablo Jr. in the finals of a sixteen-man tournament	
—	Vacated	August 5, 2018	—	—	—	—	Vacated after Pantera had not defended the championship since January 2018	
14	Redimido	November 15, 2018	IWRG Cabelleras Vs. Cabelleras	Naucalpan, State of Mexico	1	21	Defeated Atomic Star, Baby Extreme, Baby Star, Mr. Puma, Puma de Oro and Sobredosis in a battle royal for the vacant title	
—	Vacated	December 6, 2020	—	—	—	—		
15	Baby Extreme	December 6, 2020	IWRG show	Naucalpan, State of Mexico	1	218	Defeated Puma de Oro for the vacant title	
—	Vacated	July 12, 2021	—	—	—	—	Vacated when Baby Extreme left the promotion	
16	Puma de Oro	July 15, 2021	IWRG Thursday Night Wrestling	Naucalpan, State of Mexico	1	107	Defeated Aster Boy, Baby Star Jr., Lunatic Xtreme, Mr. Puma, Noicy Boy, Redimido and Sobredosis in an eight-way elimination match for the vacant title	
17	Aster Boy	October 30, 2021	IWRG Castillo Del Terror 2021	Naucalpan, State of Mexico	1	389		
18	Spider Fly	November 24, 2022	101. Torneo Fill	Naucalpan, State of Mexico	1	339		
19	Aguila Roja	October 29, 2023	IWRG show	Naucalpan, State of Mexico	1	938		
20	Aguila Oriental	May 24, 2026	IWRG show	Naucalpan, State of Mexico	1	107+		

== Combined reigns ==
As of 15 June 2026

†	Indicates the current champion

Rank	Wrestler	No. of reigns	Combined days
1	Imposible	1	1,142
2	Aguila Roja	1	938
3	Pantera I	1	630
4	Aster Boy	1	389
5	Dr. Cerebro	1	385
6	Chicano	1	365
7	Spider Fly	1	339
8	Comando Negro	1	277
9	Freelance	1	255
10	Baby Extreme	1	218
11	Carta Brava Jr.	1	192
12	Aguila Oriental †	1	107+
13	Puma de Oro	1	107
14	Avisman	1	102
15	Zatura	1	95
16	Tetsuya Bushi	2	80
17	Trauma II	1	59
18	Dinamic Black	1	49
19	Redimido	1	21
