= IWRG Intercontinental Trios Championship =

Professional wrestling championship by International Wrestling Revolution Group

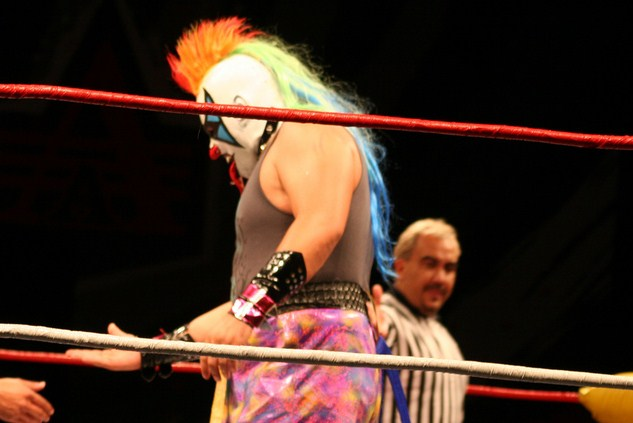
- Psycho Clown, who teamed with Murder Clown and Monster Clown to win the Trios Championship

Details
- Promotion: International Wrestling Revolution Group
- Date established: November 11, 1999
- Current champions: Revolucion Crew (El Hijo de Canis Lupus, Multifacetico Jr. and Rey Mictlan)
- Date won: August 21, 2025
Statistics
- First champions: Escuadrón de la Muerte (Maniac Cop, Vader Cop and Cyborg Cop)
- Most reigns: Los Piratas (Pirata Morgan, Pirata Morgan Jr. and El Hijo de Pirata Morgan)
- Longest reign: La Dinastía de la Muerte (2,520 days) (Negro Navarro, Trauma I and Trauma II))
- Shortest reign: Los Poderosos (Hombre Sin Miedo, Kendor Jr. and Sobredosis) (7 days)

The IWRG Intercontinental Trios Championship (Campeon Intercontinental Trios de IWRG in Spanish) is a Trios (six-man) tag team Championship promoted by the Mexican Lucha libre professional wrestling promotion International Wrestling Revolution Group (IWRG) and was introduced in 2000. As it is a professional wrestling championship, the championship was not won not by actual competition, but by a scripted ending to a match determined by the bookers and match makers. (Note: Hornbaker (2016) p. 550: "Professional wrestling is a sport in which match finishes are predetermined. Thus, win–loss records are not indicative of a wrestler's genuine success based on their legitimate abilities – but on now much, or how little they were pushed by promoters") On occasion the promotion declares a championship vacant, which means there is no champion at that point in time. This can either be due to a storyline, (Note: Duncan & Will (2000) p. 271, Chapter: Texas: NWA American Tag Team Title [World Class, Adkisson] "Championship held up and rematch ordered because of the interference of manager Gary Hart") or real life issues such as a champion suffering an injury being unable to defend the championship, (Note: Duncan & Will (2000) p. 20, Chapter: (United States: 19th Century & widely defended titles – NWA, WWF, AWA, IW, ECW, NWA) NWA/WCW TV Title "Rhodes stripped on 85/10/19 for not defending the belt after having his leg broken by Ric Flair and Ole & Arn Anderson") or leaving the company. (Note: Duncan & Will (2000) p. 201, Chapter: (Memphis, Nashville) Memphis: USWA Tag Team Title "Vacant on 93/01/18 when Spike leaves the USWA.")

The championship was first won by Escuadrón de la Muerte (Spanish for "the Squadron of Death"; Maniac Cop, Vader Cop and Cyborg Cop) as they defeated the team of Oficial, Vigilante and Guardian in Naucalpan, Mexico on November 11, 1999. The title has primarily been defended in Naucalpan since its inception as it is the "home" of IWRG. Los Piratas (Pirata Morgan, Pirata Morgan Jr. and El Hijo de Pirata Morgan) is the only trio to have held the title twice, Cerebro Negro and Veneno are the only other wrestlers have held the title twice but with different partners. The trio of Los Poderosos (Hombre Sin Miedo, Kendor Jr. and Sobredosis) held the title for seven days, the shortest reign of any championship trio. Revolucion Crew (El Hijo de Canis Lupus, Multifacetico Jr. and Rey Mictlan) are the current Trios champions, having won the championship in a match against Las Shotas (Jessy Ventura, La Diva Salvaje and Mamba) on August 21, 2025 in Naucalpan, State of Mexico. They are the 26th overall Trios champions and the 25th trio to hold the championship.

== Title history ==
Key
No.	Overall reign number
Reign	Reign number for the specific team—reign numbers for the individuals are in parentheses, if different
Days	Number of days held
N/A	Unknown information
(NLT)	Championship change took place "no later than" the date listed
†	Championship change is unrecognized by the promotion
+	Current reign is changing daily

No.	Champion	Championship change			Reign statistics		Notes	Ref.
No.	Champion	Date	Event	Location	Reign	Days	Notes	Ref.
1	Escuadrón de la Muerte (Maniac Cop, Vader Cop and Cyborg Cop)	November 11, 1999	IWRG show	Naucalpan, State of Mexico	1	178	Defeated Oficial, Vigilante and Guardian to become first champions.	
2	Los Villanos (Villano III, Villano IV and Villano V)	May 7, 2000	IWRG show	Naucalpan, State of Mexico	1	683		
—	Vacated	March 21, 2002	—	—	—	—	Los Villanos were stripped of the titles as Villano V suffered a serious injury.	
3	La Legión Japonesa (NOSAWA, Takemura and Masada)	June 5, 2003	IWRG show	Naucalpan, State of Mexico	1	10	Defeated Los Megas in a tournament final to win the vacant titles.	
4	Los Megas (Mega, Omega and Ultra Mega)	June 15, 2003	IWRG show	Naucalpan, State of Mexico	1	(Note: The exact date Los Megas were stripped of the title is not known placing the title reign between 352 and 381 days.)		
—	Vacated	2005	—	—	—	—	Titles vacated as not all of Los Megas worked for IWRG and they had not been defended in a year.	
5	La Corporación (Black Tiger (III), Pentagon Black and El Pantera)	June 2, 2005	IWRG show	Naucalpan, State of Mexico	1	119	Defeated Los Villanos in a tournament final to win the vacant titles.	
6	Negro Casas, El Felino and Heavy Metal	August 29, 2005	IWRG show	Naucalpan, State of Mexico	1	133		
7	La Corporación (Cerebro Negro, Veneno and Scorpio Jr.)	January 5, 2006	IWRG show	Naucalpan, State of Mexico	1	(Note: The exact date Scorio Jr. left IWRG is not known placing the title reign between 27 and 54 days.)		
—	Vacated	February 2006	—	—	—	—	Titles vacated when Scorpio Jr. left the promotion.	
8	Fantasma de la Opera, El Hijo del Diablo and Veneno	December 25, 2006	IWRG show	Naucalpan, State of Mexico	1 (1, 1, 2)	52	Defeated Dr. Cerebro, Suicida and Cerebro Negro.	
9	Dr. Cerebro, Mike Segura and Cerebro Negro	February 15, 2007	IWRG show	Naucalpan, State of Mexico	1 (1, 1, 2)	154		
10	Los Oficiales (Cyborg, Kraneo and Xibalba)	July 19, 2007	IWRG show	Naucalpan, State of Mexico	1	437		
11	Los Oficiales (Oficial 911, Oficial AK-47 and Oficial Fierro)	September 28, 2008	IWRG show	Naucalpan, State of Mexico	1	886		
12	Los Maniacos (Joe Líder, Silver King and Último Gladiador)	March 3, 2011	IWRG show	Naucalpan, State of Mexico	1	52		
13	Los Psycho Circus (Monster Clown, Murder Clown and Psycho Clown)	April 24, 2011	Guerra de Empresas (2011)	Naucalpan, State of Mexico	1	126	This was a four–way elimination steel cage match, also involving Los Oficiales (Oficial 911, Oficial AK-47 and Oficial Fierro) and Los Perros del Mal (Bestia 666, Damián 666 and X-Fly).	
14	Los Perros del Mal (Bestia 666, Damián 666 and X-Fly)	August 28, 2011	La Jaula de la Muerte	Naucalpan, State of Mexico	1	95	This was a four–way elimination steel cage Title vs. Hairs match, also involving Los Temerarios (Black Terry, Durok and Machin) and Los Villanos (Kortiz, Ray Mendoza Jr. and Villano IV).	
15	Los Junior Dinamitas (Cien Caras Jr., El Hijo de Máscara Año 2000 and Máscara Año 2000, Jr.)	December 1, 2011	IWRG show	Naucalpan, State of Mexico	1	178		
16	La Familia de Tijuana (Damián 666, Headhunter A and X-Fly)	May 27, 2012	IWRG show	Naucalpan, State of Mexico	1 (2, 1, 2)	21		
—	Vacated	June 17, 2012	IWRG show	Naucalpan, State of Mexico	—	—	La Familia de Tijuana was stripped of the titles after Damián 666 missed an IWRG event due to travel issues.	
17	Los Piratas (Pirata Morgan, Pirata Morgan Jr. and El Hijo de Pirata Morgan)	March 24, 2013	IWRG show	Naucalpan, State of Mexico	1	225	Defeated Los Oficiales (911, AK-47 and Fierro), La Familia de Tijuana (Mosco X-Fly, Super Nova and Eterno) and Comandos Elite (Rayan and Factor) and Máscara Año 2000, Jr. to win the vacant championship.	
18	Los Poderosos (Hombre Sin Miedo, Kendor Jr. and Sobredosis)	November 4, 2013	Promociones Cantu live event	Nuevo Laredo	1	7		
19	Los Piratas (Pirata Morgan, Pirata Morgan Jr. and El Hijo de Pirata Morgan)	November 11, 2013	Promociones Cantu live event	Nuevo Laredo	2	636	This was a mask vs. hairs match as well.	
20	La Dinastía de la Muerte (Negro Navarro, Trauma I and Trauma II)	August 9, 2015	Promociones Cantu live event	Nuevo Laredo	1	2,520		
21	Espartaco, Latino and Tempestad	July 3, 2022	Promociones Cantu live event	Saltillo, Coahuila	1	421		
22	Poder del Norte (Mocho Cota Jr., Súper Comando and Tito Santana)	August 28, 2023	Promociones Cantu live event	Nuevo Laredo	1	111		
23	La Pandemia (Gran Pandemonium, Hijo De Pandemonium and Pandemonium Jr.)	December 17, 2023	IWRG Revolucion 61	Naucalpan, State of Mexico	1	88	Poder del Norte did not show up to defend their title. The commission ruled La Pandemia the champions by forfeit.	
24	Mala Fama (Arez, Látigo and Toxin)	March 14, 2024	IWRG Tryout Gran Final	Naucalpan, State of Mexico	1	231		
25	Las Shotas (Jessy Ventura, La Diva Salvaje and Mamba)	October 31, 2024	Castillo del Terror	Naucalpan, State of Mexico	1	294	Noisy Boy stood in for Arez.	
26	Revolucion Crew (El Hijo de Canis Lupus, Multifacetico Jr. and Rey Mictlan)	August 21, 2025	IWRG Thursday Night Wrestling	Naucalpan, State of Mexico	1	437+		

== Combined reigns ==
As of 13 June 2026

¤	The exact length of at least one title reign is uncertain.
†	Indicates the current champions

Rank	Team	No. of reigns	Combined days
1	La Dinastía de la Muerte (Negro Navarro, Trauma I and Trauma II)	1	2,520
2	Los Oficiales (Oficial 911, Oficial AK-47 and Oficial Fierro)	1	886
3	Los Piratas (Pirata Morgan, Pirata Morgan Jr. and El Hijo de Pirata Morgan)	2	861
4	Los Villanos (Villano III, Villano IV and Villano V)	1	683
5	Revolucion Crew † (El Hijo de Canis Lupus, Multifacetico Jr. and Rey Mictlan)	1	437+
6	Los Oficiales (Cyborg, Kraneo and Xibalba)	1	437
7	Espartaco, Latino and Tempestad	1	421
8	Los Megas (Mega, Omega and Ultra Mega)	1	352¤
9	Las Shotas (Jessy Ventura, La Diva Salvaje and Mamba)	1	294
10	Mala Fama (Arez, Látigo and Toxin)	1	231
11	Los Junior Dinamitas (Cien Caras Jr., Máscara Año 2000 and Máscara Año 2000, Jr.)	1	178
11	Escuadrón de la Muerte (Maniac Cop, Vader Cop and Cyborg Cop)	1	178¤
13	Dr. Cerebro, Mike Segura and Cerebro Negro	1	154
14	Negro Casas, El Felino and Heavy Metal	1	133
15	Los Psycho Circus (Monster Clown, Murder Clown and Psycho Clown)	1	126
16	La Corporación (Black Tiger III, Pentagon Black and El Pantera)	1	119
17	Poder del Norte (Mocho Cota Jr., Súper Comando and Tito Santana)	1	111
18	Los Perros del Mal (Bestia 666, Damián 666 and X-Fly)	1	95
19	La Pandemia (Gran Pandemonium, Hijo De Pandemonium and Pandemonium Jr.)	1	88
20	Hijo del Diablo, Fantasma de la Opera and Veneno	1	52
20	Los Maniacos (Joe Líder, Silver King and Último Gladiador)	1	52
22	La Corporación (Cerebro Negro, Veneno and Scorpio Jr.)	1	27¤
23	La Familia de Tijuana (Damián 666, Headhunter A and X-Fly)	1	21
24	La Legión Japonesa (NOSAWA, Takemura and Masada)	1	10
25	Los Poderosos (Hombre Sin Miedo, Kendor Jr. and Sobredosis)	1	7

=== By wrestler ===
Rank	Wrestler	No. of reigns	Combined days
1	Negro Navarro	1	2,520
1	Trauma I	1	2,520
1	Trauma II	1	2,520
4	Ultra Mega/Oficial Fierro	2	1,238¤
5	Oficial 911	1	886
5	Oficial AK-47	1	886
7	Pirata Morgan	2	861
7	Pirata Morgan Jr.	2	861
7	El Hijo de Pirata Morgan	2	861
10	Villano III	1	683
10	Villano IV	1	683
10	Villano V	1	683
13	El Hijo de Canis Lupus	1	437+
13	Multifacetico Jr.	1	437+
13	Rey Mictlan	1	437+
16	Cyborg	1	437
16	Kraneo	1	437
16	Xibalba	1	437
19	Espartaco	1	421
19	Latino	1	421
19	Tempestad	1	421
22	Mega	1	352¤
22	Omega	1	352¤
24	Jessy Ventura	1	294
24	La Diva Salvaje	1	294
24	Mamba	1	294
27	Arez	1	231
27	Látigo	1	231
27	Toxin	1	231
30	Cerebro Negro	2	181¤
31	Cien Caras Jr.	1	178
31	Cyborg Cop	1	178
31	Hijo de Máscara Año 2000	1	178
31	Maniac Cop	1	178
31	Máscara Año 2000, Jr.	1	178
31	Vader Cop	1	178
37	Black Tiger III/Silver King	2	171
38	Dr. Cerebro	1	154
38	Mike Segura	1	154
40	El Felino	1	133
40	Heavy Metal	1	133
40	Negro Casas	1	133
43	Monster Clown	1	126
43	Murder Clown	1	126
43	Psycho Clown	1	126
46	Pantera	1	119
46	Pentagon Black	1	119
48	Damián 666	2	116
48	X-Fly	2	116
50	Mocho Cota Jr.	1	111
50	Súper Comando	1	111
50	Tito Santana	1	111
53	Bestia 666	1	95
54	Gran Pandemonium	1	88
54	Hijo De Pandemonium	1	88
54	Pandemonium Jr.	1	88
57	Veneno	2	79¤
58	Fantasma de la Opera	1	52
58	Hijo del Diablo	1	52
58	Joe Líder	1	52
58	Último Gladiador	1	52
62	Scorpio Jr.	1	27¤
63	Headhunter A	1	21
64	Mazada	1	10
64	NOSAWA	1	10
64	Takemura	1	10
67	Hombre Sin Miedo	1	7
67	Kendor Jr.	1	7
67	Sobredosis	1	7
