= International Wrestling Revolution Group =

Mexican professional wrestling promotion

International Wrestling Revolution Group Grupo Internacional Revolución
- Acronym: IWRG
- Founded: January 1, 1996
- Style: Lucha libre
- Headquarters: Naucalpan, State of Mexico, Mexico
- Founder: Adolfo Moreno
- Owner(s): Cesar Moreno; Marco Moreno
- Predecessor: Promociones Moreno
- Website: www.iwrg.mx

International Wrestling Revolution Group (Grupo Internacional Revolución in Spanish; the Spanish name is used for the promotion while the English initials are used for the title governing body) is a Mexican professional wrestling promotion based in Naucalpan, State of Mexico. Founded in 1996 by Adolfo Moreno and since Moreno's death in late 2007 has been controlled by his sons Alfredo and Marco Moreno.

IWRG has its own championships but like many Mexican promotions recognizes champions from other promotions, occasionally allowing them to defend those titles on IWRG shows. In recent times the company has become a more direct competitor to Consejo Mundial de Lucha Libre (CMLL) and Asistencia Asesoria y Administracion (AAA), acquiring a national television deal with TV Azteca and using a number of talent that have left CMLL or AAA to bolster their ranks and profile. IWRG's home base is Arena Naucalpan where the majority of their shows are held, though they have regularly promoted shows at other venues such as Arena Emiliano Zapata, Arena Xochimilco and Arena Neza. In 2024, the promotion began airing their shows on their YouTube channel.

== History ==
Wrestler-turned-promoter Adolfo "Pirata" Moreno began promoting wrestling shows in his native Naucalpan de Juárez, Mexico, bringing in wrestlers from Empresa Mexicana de Lucha Libre (EMLL) to Naucalpan as well as featuring wrestlers from the Mexican independent circuit. Later on he would promote shows mainly in "Arena KO Al Gusto" and served as the Universal Wrestling Association (UWA) partner, using the name Promociones Moreno as the business name for his promotional efforts. In 1977 Moreno bought the run down Arena KO Al Gusto and had Arena Naucalpan built in its place, an arena designed specifically for wrestling shows, with a maximum capacity of 2,400 spectators for the shows. Arena Naucalpan became the permanent home for Promociones Moreno, with very few shows held elsewhere. In the 1990s the UWA folded and Promociones Moreno worked primarily with EMLL, now rebranded as Consejo Mundial de Lucha Libre (CMLL). From the mid-1990s Moreno would promote several Naucalpan championships, including the Naucalpan Tag Team Championship, Naucalpan Middleweight Championship and the Naucalpan Welterweight Championship, all sanctioned by the local boxing and wrestling commission.

In late 1995 Adolfo Moreno decided to create his own promotion, creating a regular roster instead of relying totally on wrestlers from other promotions, creating the International Wrestling Revolution Group (IWRG; sometimes referred to as Grupo Internacional Revolución in Spanish) on January 1, 1996. From that point on Arena Naucalpan became the main venue for IWRG, hosting the majority of their weekly shows and all of their major shows as well. With the creation of the IWRG Moreno abandoned the Naucalpan championships, instead introducing a series of IWRG branded championships, starting with the IWRG Intercontinental Middleweight Championship created on July 27, 1997, followed by the IWRG Intercontinental Heavyweight Championship two months later. IWRG also kept promoting the Distrito Federal Trios Championship, the only championship predating the foundation of the IWRG. In 2007 Adolfo Moreno died, leaving his sons Cesar and Marco Moreno to take ownership of both International Wrestling Revolution Group as well as Arena Naucalpan.

== Working with other promotions ==
IWRG often works together with other wrestling promotions, booking their wrestlers on IWRG shows and sending IWRG wrestlers to work for the other promotions. They also co-promote events, recognize non-IWRG championships and at times allow them to be defended on IWRG shows.

=== Último Dragón Gym/Toryumon Mexico ===
IWRG was affiliated with Último Dragón and Toryumon Mexico (Ultimo Dragon Gym) from the time of IWRG's creation until 2001. The early Toryumon Mexico shows were co-promoted by IWRG and Último Dragón in Naucalpan and students regularly worked on IWRG s shows. CIMA, SUWA, Yasushi Kanda, Susumu Mochizuki and Magnum Tokyo have all held IWRG championships through the working relationship.

=== Consejo Mundial de Lucha Libre ===
IWRG developed a talent agreement with Consejo Mundial de Lucha Libre (CMLL) in the early 2000s, which allowed them to use CMLL talent regularly, as well as being used by CMLL as a sort of developmental territory for young wrestlers. The two promotions had a falling out in late 2007, over IWRG booking El Hijo del Santo on their shows, in disregard of CMLL having stated that did not want any of their associates to use Hijo del Santo on their shows.

=== Asistencia Asesoría y Administración ===
During a show on April 29, 2010 Asistencia Asesoría y Administración (AAA) wrestler Silver King showed up for the show, allegedly to promote a movie, to signal the beginning of IWRG and AAA working together for the first time.

=== Pro Wrestling Noah ===
On December 5, 2019, it was announced that IWRG and Pro Wrestling Noah had entered into a talent-sharing partnership.

== Roster ==
Like many promotions on the Mexican independent circuit IWRG does not generally have wrestlers under exclusive full-time contracts and often works with a number of wrestlers on a "per appearance" basis. IWRG does employ a core group of wrestlers on a regular basis but does not have an official "roster" as such.

== Major shows ==
Each year IWRG promotes a number of signature events, some shown on television and others only for the people in attendance. The major shows, shown in order of when they happen during the year, include:

Event	Most recent/Next Date	Notes
IWRG Anniversary Show	January 1, 2018	Always held on or around January 1. Last event held was the IWRG 22nd Anniversary Show
El Protector	February 25, 2018	Annual tag team tournament that sees a relative newcomer team up with a veteran wrestler. Latest event held was the 2016 El Protector
La Guerra de Familias	July 5, 2015	A tournament for wrestling "families", last event held was the Guerra de Familias (2015)
Guerra de Sexos	February 5, 2012	IWRG's "Battle of the Sexes", main evented by a steel cage match that includes both male, female, Exotico and Mini-Estrella wrestlers. Last event held was the 2012 Guerra de Sexos.
Rebelión de los Juniors	March 18, 2018	Event that focuses on second-generation wrestlers. Last event held was the 2016 Rebelión de los Juniors
Guerra del Golfo	April 15, 2018	The losers of two multi-man steel cage matches face off in the main event steel cage match under Luchas de Apuestas rules where the loser would be either unmasked or shaved bald. Last event held was the 2016 Guerra del Golfo.
Rey del Ring	May 20, 2018	Annual event featuring a 30-man timed Battle Royal elimination match. Last event held was the 2016 Rey del Ring.
Legado Final	July 30, 2017	Main event is the Torneo de Legado Final involving tag teams made up of fathers and sons, or other family members teaming together. Last event held was the 2015 Legado Final.
Guerra de Empresas	July 8, 2012	IWRG's War of the Promotions, a tournament where teams representing IWRG face teams representing other wrestling promotions.
Festival de las Máscaras	June 17, 2018	Previously unmasked wrestlers are allowed to wear their old mask for one special event each year. Last event held was the 2016 Festival de las Máscaras
La Gran Cruzada	August 20, 2017	Annual tournament, 30-man Battle Royal to determine the #1 contender for the Rey del Ring Championship. The most recent show was the 2015 Gran Cruzada show.
Caravana de Campeones	September 9, 2018	Event held several times a year, focusing on the various championships that IWRG promotes. IWRG most recently held the 2015 Caravana de Campeones show.
Ruleta de la Muerte	April 9, 2015	A "Loser advances" tournament with the last match being for the wrestler's mask or hair. Last event held was the 2015 Ruleta de la Muerte
El Castillo del Terror	November 1, 2018	Main event is the eponymous Castillo del Terror steel cage match where the loser is unmasked or shaved bald as a result. Last event held was the 2016 Castillo del Terror show.
Guerra Revolucionaria	May 18, 2015	A 16-man Torneo Cibernetico elimination match.
Prison Fatal	July 23, 2017	Latest addition, a steel cage match main event. The most recent event was the 2017 Prison Fatal.
Arena Naucalpan Anniversary Show	December 17, 2017	Celebrates the construction of IWRG's main venue, Arena Naucalpan. Most recent event was the Arena Naucalpan 39th Anniversary Show.

== Championships ==
Active championships

Championship	Current champion(s)	Reign	Date won	Days held	Location	Notes
IWRG Intercontinental Heavyweight Championship	DMT Azul	2	October 30, 2025	367+	Naucalpan, State of Mexico	Defeated then-champion Dr. Wagner Jr., Chessman, Pirata Morgan at IWRG Castillo Del Terror 2025.
IWRG Intercontinental Middleweight Championship	Flamita	1	April 19, 2026	197+	Naucalpan, State of Mexico	Defeated Toxin at IWRG Guerra Del Golfo 2026.
IWRG Intercontinental Welterweight Championship	Dr. Cerebro Jr.	1	January 1, 2024	1,036+	Naucalpan, State of Mexico	Defeated Tonalli at IWRG Guerreros De Acero 2024.
IWRG Intercontinental Lightweight Championship	Aguila Oriental	1	May 24, 2026	162+	Naucalpan, State of Mexico	Defeated Aguila Roja at an IWRG show.
IWRG Intercontinental Tag Team Championship	Jack Morris and Tirano	1 (1, 1)	October 8, 2026	25+	Naucalpan, State of Mexico	Defeated Mexa Boy's (Aguila Oriental and Noisy Boy) in a tournament final for the vacant titles at IWRG Thrusday Night Wrestling.
IWRG Intercontinental Trios Championship	Revolucion Crew (El Hijo de Canis Lupus, Multifacetico Jr. and Rey Mictlan)	1 (1, 1, 1)	August 21, 2025	438+	Naucalpan, State of Mexico	Defeated Las Shotas (Jessy Ventura, La Diva Salvaje and Mamba) at IWRG Thursday Night Wrestling.
IWRG Junior de Juniors Championship	El Hijo Del Fishman	1	January 1, 2023	1,401+	Naucalpan, State of Mexico	Defeated Dick Angelo 3G at IWRG Guerraros De Acero 2023.
IWRG Rey del Ring Championship	Vangellys	1	May 12, 2024	904+	Naucalpan, State of Mexico	Defeated Vito Fratelli at IWRG House Show for the title.

Championship	Current Champion(s)	Held since	Days held
IWRG Rey del Aire Championship	Rey Halcon	October 30, 2026	3
IWRG Mexico Championship	Toxin	January 1, 2020	2,497
Distrito Federal Trios Championship	El Infierno Eterno (Demonio Infernal, Eterno, and Lunatic Xtreme)	February 2, 2019	2,830+

Inactive IWRG championships

Championship:	Last champion(s):	Date won:
IWRG Intercontinental Super Welterweight Championship	Místico	November 19, 2006
IWRG Intercontinental Women's Championship	La Amapola	2005
IWC World Heavyweight Championship	Pirata Morgan	1999

== Tournaments ==
IWRG conducts several annual tournaments which usually signify a big push. Some tournaments have been left off the schedule some years for unexplained reasons, others have been held several times in a year

=== Active tournaments ===
Tournament	Last winner	Last held	Notes	Ref(s).
Copa Higher Power	Gimnasio Konkreto	January 1, 2013	A tournament between IWRG's trainees and other wrestling gyms	
Gran Cruzada	Mosco X-Fly	September 6, 2015	Winner normally earns a match for the IWRG Rey del Ring Championship	
Guerra de Empresas	Cibernético and La Parka	July 8, 2012	A tournament featuring two or more promotions	
Torneo de Legado Final	Dragón Celestial and El Hijo del Diablo	August 2, 2015	A father/son tag team tournament	
El Protector	Rokambole Jr. and Villano V Jr.	February 25, 2018		
Rey del Ring	Hijo De Pirata Morgan	May 19, 2025	Both an annual tournament and defended like a championship between tournaments.	

=== Past tournaments ===
These are tournaments that have been held in the past by IWRG but have not been promoted in the last two years.

Tournament	Last winner	Last held	Notes	Ref(s).
Proyeccion a Nuevas Promesas	Comando Negro and Scorpio, Jr.	January 13, 2011	Replaced with the El Protector tournament in 2011.	

== See also ==
- List of professional wrestling promotions in Mexico
