= IWRG Anniversary Shows =

International Wrestling Revolution Group event series

The International Wrestling Revolution Group Anniversary Shows is an annual major lucha libre event produced and scripted by the Mexican International Wrestling Revolution Group (IWRG; sometimes referred to as Grupo Internacional Revolución in Mexico). The show is always held on or just after January 1 each year, marking the creation of IWRG on January 1, 1996. The anniversary shows are often, but not always main evented by a Lucha de Apuestas, or "bet match", where a wrestler will put his wrestling mask or hair on the line.

The first Anniversary show was held on January 1, 1997, but records are unclear on the actual results of the show. Some years the anniversary is celebrated by IWRG holding one of their other annual shows to commemorate the date, such as the January 2009 Guerra del Golfo ("Gulf War") that was also the IWRG 13th Anniversary Show. In 2010 IWRG held the first ever Torneo Relampago de Proyeccion a Nuevas Promesas de la Lucha Libre (Spanish for "Projecting a new promise lightning tournament") tournament on January 1, marking the 14th anniversary. In 2011 the 15th-anniversary show was marked by IWRG arranging a Guerra de Empresas ("War of the promotions") tournament to mark the day.

== History ==
Wrestler-turned-promoter Adolfo "Pirata" Moreno began promoting wrestling shows in his native Naucalpan de Juárez, Mexico, bringing in wrestlers from Empresa Mexicana de Lucha Libre (EMLL) to Naucalpan as well as featuring wrestlers from the Mexican independent circuit. Later on he would promote shows mainly in "Arena KO Al Gusto" and served as the Universal Wrestling Association (UWA) partner, using the name Promociones Moreno as the business name for his promotional efforts. In 1977 Moreno bought the run down Arena KO Al Gusto and had Arena Naucalpan built in its place, an arena designed specifically for wrestling shows, with a maximum capacity of 2,400 spectators for the shows. Arena Naucalpan became the permanent home for Promociones Moreno, with very few shows held elsewhere. In the 1990s the UWA folded and Promociones Moreno worked primarily with EMLL, now rebranded as Consejo Mundial de Lucha Libre (CMLL). From the mid-1990s Moreno would promote several Naucalpan championships, including the Naucalpan Tag Team Championship, Naucalpan Middleweight Championship and the Naucalpan Welterweight Championship, all sanctioned by the local boxing and wrestling commission.

In late 1995 Adolfo Moreno decided to create his own promotion, creating a regular roster instead of relying totally on wrestlers from other promotions, creating the International Wrestling Revolution Group (IWRG; sometimes referred to as Grupo Internacional Revolución in Spanish) on January 1, 1996. From that point on Arena Naucalpan became the main venue for IWRG, hosting the majority of their weekly shows and all of their major shows as well. With the creation of the IWRG Moreno abandoned the Naucalpan championships, instead introducing a series of IWRG branded championships, starting with the IWRG Intercontinental Middleweight Championship created on July 27, 1997, followed by the IWRG Intercontinental Heavyweight Championship two months later. IWRG also kept promoting the Distrito Federal Trios Championship, the only championship predating the foundation of the IWRG. In 2007 Adolfo Moreno died, leaving his sons César and Marco Moreno to take ownership of both International Wrestling Revolution Group as well as Arena Naucalpan.

== Event history ==
Each year on or right after January 1 IWRG has traditionally held a major lucha libre event to commemorate the creation of IWRG, starting in 1997. Records confirm that an anniversary show was indeed held but no details on what matches were held or what the results have been found. Over the years IWRG has celebrated the anniversary by holding one or more Lucha de Apuestas, or "bet matches", where all wrestlers involved in the match would risk their wrestling mask or hair, "betting" it on the outcome of the match. In Lucha libre the traditions surrounding the Luchas de Apuestas match makes it the most prestigious type of match, more important to the Mexican fans and wrestlers alike than championship matches, The earliest anniversary show with confirmed results is the IWRG 5th Anniversary Show main evented by a best two-out-of-three falls eight-man tag team match with the team of Bombero Infernal, El Enterrador and Los Megas (Mega and Super Mega) defeating Black Dragon, Kato Kung Lee, Mike Segura and Tony Rivera.

In 2009 IWRG held their annual Guerra del Golfo ("Gulf War") on January 1 having the show doubled as the IWRG 13th Anniversary Show. In the main event steel cage match Dr. Cerebro defeated Cerebro Negro, forcing Cerebro Negro to be shaved bald as a result. The following year IWRG held the first ever Torneo Relampago de Proyeccion a Nuevas Promesas de la Lucha Libre (Spanish for "Projecting a new promise lightning tournament") tournament on January 1, marking their 14th anniversary with the tournament. The tournament would become an annual tradition under the name El Protector.

In 2011 IWRG celebrated their 15th Anniversary by holding a Guerra de Empresas ("War of the promotions") tournament inviting representatives from other wrestling promotions. such as Asistencia Asesoria y Administracion, Los Perros del Mal, Desastre Total Ultraviolento and Alianza Universal de Lucha Libre to compete in a tag team tournament. The tournament was won by AAA representatives Los Psycho Circus (Monster Clown and Psycho Clown) as they defeated Perros del Mal representatives Super Crazy and X-Fly.

== Dates, venues, and main events ==
Event	Date	Main event	Ref(s)
1st Anniversary Show	January 1, 1997	Unknown	
2nd Anniversary Show	January 1998	Unknown	
3rd Anniversary Show	January 1999	Unknown	
4th Anniversary Show	January 2000	Unknown	
5th Anniversary Show	January 1, 2001	Bombero Infernal, El Enterrador and Los Megas (Mega and Super Mega) vs. Black Dragon, Kato Kung Lee, Mike Segura and Tony Rivera	
6th Anniversary Show	January 2, 2002	El Pantera and Pentagón Black vs. Bombero Infernal and Último Vampiro	
7th Anniversary Show	January 1, 2003	Último Vampiro vs Bombero Infernal in a Luchas de Apuestas match	
8th Anniversary Show	January 1, 2004	Brazo de Plata, Fantasy and El Felino vs. Cerebro Negro, Mike Segura and Scorpio Jr.	
9th Anniversary Show	January 2005	Unknown	
10th Anniversary Show	January 1, 2006	Cerebro Negro vs. El Enterrador 2000 vs. Scorpio Jr. vs. Veneno vs. Xibalba vs. Cyborg in a six-way Lucha de Apuestas match	
11th Anniversary Show	January 2007	Unknown	
12th Anniversary Show	January 2008	Unknown	
13th Anniversary Show	January 1, 2009	Dr. Cerebro vs. Cerebro Negro in a Lucha de Apuestas steel cage match	
14th Anniversary Show	January 1, 2010	Hijo del Signo and Dr. Cerebro defeated Comando Negro and Oficial 911	
15th Anniversary Show	January 2, 2011	Los Psycho Circus (Murder Clown and Psycho Clown) vs. Los Perros del Mal (Super Crazy and X-Fly)	
16th Anniversary Show	January 1, 2012	Multifacético vs. Apolo Estrada, Jr. in a Lucha de Apuestas match	
17th Anniversary Show	January 1, 2013	Oficial 911 and El Ángel vs. Oficial Factor and Hijo de Pirata Morgan in a Relevos Suicidas tag team match	
18th Anniversary Show	January 1, 2014	Cien Caras, Jr., Super Nova and X-Fly vs. Lizmark, Jr., Vampiro Canadiense and Villano IV	
19th Anniversary Show	January 1, 2015	El Hijo de Dos Caras, Máscara Sagrada and Pantera vs. Monsther, Pirata Morgan and El Hijo del Pirata Morgan	
20th Anniversary Show	January 3, 2016	Danny Casas vs. Toscano in a Lucha de Apuestas match	
21st Anniversary Show	January 1, 2017	Imposible vs. Golden Magic vs. Pirata Morgan Jr. vs. Relámpago in a steel cage match	
22nd Anniversary Show	January 1, 2018	Imposible (c) vs. Dr. Cerebro in an IWRG Rey del Ring Championship Ladder steel cage match	
23rd Anniversary Show	January 1, 2019	Máscara Año 2000 Jr. vs Toscano in a Luchas de Apuestas, hair vs. hair, steel cage match	
24th Anniversary Show	January 1, 2019	Fuerza Guerrera Nueva Generacion vs. Pasion Cristal vs. Demonio Infernal vs. Ave Rex vs. Emperador Azteca vs. El Hijo del Alebrije in a Steel cage match for the "Briefcase of Glory"	
