= IWRG 10th Anniversary Show =

2006 International Wrestling Revolution Group event

- Promotion: International Wrestling Revolution Group
- Date: January 1, 2006
- City: Naucalpan, State of Mexico
- Venue: Arena Naucalpan

Event chronology
← Previous; Guerra del Golfo	Next → El Castillo del Terror

IWRG Anniversary Shows chronology
← Previous; 9th Anniversary	Next → 11th Anniversary

The IWRG 10th Anniversary Show was a major lucha libre event produced and scripted by the Mexican International Wrestling Revolution Group (IWRG) professional wrestling promotion on January 3, 2006. The show was held in Arena Naucalpan, Naucalpan, State of Mexico, which is IWRG's primary venue. As the name indicates the event commemorates the anniversary of IWRG, which was founded on January 1, 1996.

The main event was a special six-way match contested under Lucha de Apuestas, or "bet match", rules. For this particular match one of the competitors, Cerebro Negro, Cyborg, El Enterrador 2000, Scorpio Jr., Veneno and Xibalba, would be forced to have all his hair shaved off after losing the match per Lucha de Apuestas traditions. In the end Cyborg lost and left the arena without any hair. Sources were not clear on which of the other five wrestlers were credited with the win. The show include four additional matches, a best two-out-of-three-falls singles match, tag team match and two six-man tag team matches.

== Production ==
=== Background ===
Wrestler-turned-promoter Adolfo "Pirata" Moreno began promoting wrestling shows in his native Naucalpan de Juárez, Mexico, bringing in wrestlers from Empresa Mexicana de Lucha Libre (EMLL) to Naucalpan as well as featuring wrestlers from the Mexican independent circuit. Later he would promote shows mainly in "Arena KO Al Gusto" and served as the Universal Wrestling Association (UWA) partner, using the name Promociones Moreno as the business name for his promotional efforts. In 1977 Moreno bought the run down Arena KO Al Gusto and had Arena Naucalpan built in its place, an arena designed specifically for wrestling shows, with a maximum capacity of 2,400 spectators for the shows. Arena Naucalpan became the permanent home for Promociones Moreno, with very few shows held elsewhere.

In late 1995 Adolfo Moreno decided to create his own promotion, creating a regular roster instead of relying totally on wrestlers from other promotions, creating the International Wrestling Revolution Group (IWRG; sometimes referred to as Grupo Internacional Revolución in Spanish) on January 1, 1996. From that point on Arena Naucalpan became the main venue for IWRG, hosting the majority of their weekly shows and all of their major shows as well. The first IWRG Anniversary Show was held on January 1, 1997 with all subsequent shows being held on or right after January 1 each year, all at Arena Naucalpan.

=== Storylines ===
The event featured five professional wrestling matches with different wrestlers involved in pre-existing scripted feuds, plots and storylines. Wrestlers were portrayed as either heels (referred to as rudos in Mexico, those that portray the "bad guys") or faces (técnicos in Mexico, the "good guy" characters) as they followed a series of tension-building events, which culminated in a wrestling match or series of matches.

== Event ==
The opening match of the show was a "dark match", which meant it was not taped for IWRG's weekly wrestling show, only seen by the fans in attendance and mentioned in match reports. In the opening match, a best two-out-of-three-falls singles match, IWRG trainee Zaiyer defeated Freesbee, two falls to one. In the second match of the night the tag team of Antaris and Tiger Kid defeated Vampiro Metalico and a partner whose name has not been captured in the match reports. The third match of the night was the first traditional lucha libre best two-out-of-three-falls six-man tag team match that is the most common match form in Mexico. It was the rudo team of Carta Brava Jr., Fantasma de la Opera and Super Colt defeated the técnicos Avisman, Matrix and Ultra Mega. In the fourth match the team known as Los Payasos Tricolor ("The Three-colored Clowns"; Coco Blanco, Coco Rojo and Coco Verde), three masked wrestlers dressed up in clown costumes and clown mask, defeated the trio of Black Terry, Dr. Cerebro and Fantasma de la Opera. It is unclear who Fantasma de la Opera replaced in the match after having also wrestled in the previous match.

The main event was described as a "six-way match", fought under Lucha de Apuestas, or "bet rules" stipulations. In this case since all six wrestlers were unmasked all participants "bet" their hair on the outcome of the match. Result descriptions are not clear on the format, but most multi-man Lucha de Apuestas matches are fought under elimination rules, allowing a wrestler to leave the match when they pinned someone until there are only two left. The last person pinned would lose the match. For this particular match the results did not mention who actually pinned Cyborg, just that he lost to Cerebro Negro, El Enterrador 2000, Scorpio Jr., Veneno and Xibalva and had all his hair shaved off.

== Aftermath ==
After his main event loss, Cyborg formed a regular trios team with Bombero Infernal and Xibalva, who would defeat the team of Dr. Cerebro, Cerebro Negro and Mike Segura to win the IWRG Intercontinental Trios Championship. They held the championship for over a year until they lost them to a new version of Los Oficiales (Oficial 911, Oficial AK-47 and Oficial Fierro) on September 28, 2008. In subsequent months Cyborg focused more on training wrestlers at the IWRG school. By 2009 he returned to IWRG once more, as the masked "Arlequín Verde" ("Green Harlequin"), one third of the Los Arlequíns trio. When the concept was abandoned in 2010 the Arlequín Verde character was phased out.

In 2007 Kid Tiger began working for Consejo Mundial de Lucha Libre (CMLL) and also began training at their wrestling school in Guadalajara, Jalisco under CMLL trainers El Hijo del Gladiador, Franco Columbo, Satánico, Ringo Mendoza and Virus. In CMLL he would go under the name "Tiger Kid", often teaming with his brother, known as Puma King. They initially claimed to nephews of CMLL wrestler El Felino, but later revealed that they were in fact the sons of El Felino.

== Results ==
No.	Results	Stipulations
1^{D}	Zaiyer defeated Freesbe	Best two-out-of-three-falls singles match
2	Antaris and Tiger Kid defeated Vampiro Metalico and Unknown	Best two-out-of-three-falls tag team match
3	Carta Brava Jr., Fantasma de la Opera and Super Colt defeated Avisman, Matrix and Ultra Mega	Best two-out-of-three-falls six-man tag team match
4	Los Payasos Tricolor (Coco Blanco, Coco Rojo and Coco Verde) defeated Black Terry, Dr. Cerebro and Fantasma de la Opera	Best two-out-of-three-falls six-man tag team match
5	Cyborg lost to Cerebro Negro, El Enterrador 2000, Scorpio Jr., Veneno and Xibalva	Six-way Lucha de Apuestas, hair vs. hair match
D / – this was a dark match
