= IWRG 5th Anniversary Show =

2001 International Wrestling Revolution Group event

- Promotion: International Wrestling Revolution Group
- Date: January 1, 2001
- City: Naucalpan, State of Mexico
- Venue: Arena Naucalpan

Event chronology
← Previous; Arena Naucalpan 23rd Anniversary Show	Next → Arena Naucalpan 24th Anniversary Show

IWRG Anniversary Shows chronology
← Previous; 4th Anniversary	Next → 6th Anniversary

The IWRG 5th Anniversary Show was a major lucha libre event produced and scripted by the Mexican International Wrestling Revolution Group (IWRG) professional wrestling promotion on January 1, 2001. The show was held in Arena Naucalpan, Naucalpan, State of Mexico, which is IWRG's primary venue. As the name indicates the event commemorates the anniversary of IWRG, which was founded on January 1, 1996.

The main event of the Anniversary show was a best two-out-of-three-falls eight-man tag team match won by Bombero Infernal, El Enterrador and Los Megas (Mega and Super Mega) as they defeated Black Dragon, Kato Kung Lee, Mike Segura and Tony Rivera two falls to one. The show included four additional matches, two tag team matches and two Trios matches.

== Production ==
=== Background ===
Wrestler-turned-promoter Adolfo "Pirata" Moreno began promoting wrestling shows in his native Naucalpan de Juárez, Mexico, bringing in wrestlers from Empresa Mexicana de Lucha Libre (EMLL) to Naucalpan as well as featuring wrestlers from the Mexican independent circuit. Later on he would promote shows mainly in "Arena KO Al Gusto" and served as the Universal Wrestling Association (UWA) partner, using the name Promociones Moreno as the business name for his promotional efforts. In 1977 Moreno bought the run down Arena KO Al Gusto and had Arena Naucalpan built in its place, an arena designed specifically for wrestling shows, with a maximum capacity of 2,400 spectators for the shows. Arena Naucalpan became the permanent home for Promociones Moreno, with very few shows held elsewhere.

In late 1995 Adolfo Moreno decided to establish his own promotion, setting up a permanent roster instead of relying totally on wrestlers from other promotions, creating the International Wrestling Revolution Group (IWRG; sometimes referred to as Grupo Internacional Revolución in Spanish) on January 1, 1996. From that point on Arena Naucalpan became the main venue for IWRG, hosting the majority of their weekly shows and all of their major shows as well. The first IWRG Anniversary Show was held on January 1, 1997, with all subsequent shows being held on or right after January 1 each year, all at Arena Naucalpan.

Records of the results of the first through the fourth IWRG Anniversary Show have not been found, partially because of little Internet coverage of the Mexican independent circuit before the year 2000, partially because initially IWRG was one of many small promotions where the anniversary shows did not get much press. The IWRG 5th Anniversary Show is the first of the anniversary shows where the full results have been found documented in print or online. While online sources only identify the January 1, 2001, show as an IWRG show, Box y Lucha Magazine's coverage of 2001 labelled it as an anniversary show. Most subsequent IWRG anniversary shows featured a Lucha de Apuestas, or "bet match", main event where each wrestler would risk their wrestling mask or hair, but this was a tradition IWRG built to over the years, with the fifth anniversary show featuring a special Best two-out-of-three-falls eight-man tag team match as its main event.

=== Storylines ===
The event featured five professional wrestling matches with different wrestlers involved in pre-existing scripted feuds, plots and storylines. Wrestlers were portrayed as either heels (referred to as rudos in Mexico, those that portray the "bad guys") or faces (técnicos in Mexico, the "good guy" characters) as they followed a series of tension-building events, which culminated in a wrestling match or series of matches.

== Event ==
The opening match was a Best two-out-of-three-falls tag team match where Cat Man II and Halieen (replacing Cat Man I for unexplained reasons) defeated Aguila de Acero I and Maligno to falls to one. All four wrestlers were trainees at the IWRG wrestling school and make have taken other ring names and identities upon graduation. For the second match of the show IWRG brought in four wrestlers from the Mini-Estrella division veterans with the técnico team of Mascarita Sagrada and Octagoncito defeating El Fierito and Piratita Morgan. This was the original Mascarita Sagrada and Octagoncito, not the Mascarita Sagrada and Octagoncito that worked primarily for AAA.

In the third match of the night, the masked técnicos trio of Multifacético, Galaxia R2 (A wrestler dressed like R2-D2) and Guerra C-3 (a wrestler dressed like C-3PO) took on and defeated the trio of Bestia Rubia, Cirujano and Paramedico, two falls to one in the first traditional best two-out-of-three-falls six-man tag team match. For the fourth match IWG brought in veteran wrestler Ciclón Ramirez to team up with rookie wrestlers Fantasma Jr. and Super Yens as they defeated IWRG mainstays Los Oficiales (Guardia, Oficial and Vigilante) by disqualification. The main event was an eight-man or Atómicos ("Atomic") tag team matchwhere rudos Bombero Infernal and El Enterrador teamed up with the then heel tag team known as Los Megas (Mega and Super Mega) to defeat the team of lucha libre veteran Kato Kung Lee teaming with Black Dragon, Mike Segura and Tony Rivera.

== Aftermath ==
The masked wrestler known as "Guerra C-3" gave up the Star Wars inspired ring character in 2002, instead becoming the rudo character Cerebro Negro ("Black Brain"), taking over the "Cerebro Negro" character from someone else.

== Results ==
No.	Results	Stipulations
1	Cat Man II and Halieen defeated Aguila de Acero I and Maligno	Best two-out-of-three-falls tag team match
2	Mascarita Sagrada and Octagoncito defeated El Fierito and Piratita Morgan	Best two-out-of-three-falls tag team match
3	Galaxia R2, Guerra C-3 and Multifacético defeated Bestia Rubia, Cirujano and Paramedico	Best two-out-of-three-falls six-man tag team match
4	Ciclón Ramirez, Fantasma Jr. and Super Yens defeated Los Oficiales (Guardia, Oficial and Vigilante) by disqualification	Best two-out-of-three-falls six-man tag team match
5	Bombero Infernal, El Enterrador and Los Megas (Mega and Super Mega) defeated Black Dragon, Kato Kung Lee, Mike Segura and Tony Rivera	Best two-out-of-three-falls eight-man tag team match
