= IWRG 6th Anniversary Show =

2002 International Wrestling Revolution Group event

- Promotion: International Wrestling Revolution Group
- Date: January 3, 2002
- City: Naucalpan, State of Mexico
- Venue: Arena Naucalpan

Event chronology
← Previous; Arena Naucalpan 24th Anniversary Show	Next → Rey del Ring

IWRG Anniversary Shows chronology
← Previous; 5th Anniversary	Next → 7th Anniversary

The IWRG 6th Anniversary Show was a major lucha libre event produced and scripted by the Mexican International Wrestling Revolution Group (IWRG) professional wrestling promotion on January 3, 2002. The show was held in Arena Naucalpan, Naucalpan, State of Mexico, which is IWRG's primary venue. As the name indicates the event commemorates the anniversary of IWRG, which was founded on January 1, 1996.

In the main event the team of El Pantera and Pentagón Black defeated Bombero Infernal and Último Vampiro in a Relevos Increibles ("Incredible relays") match. The Relevos Increibles match teamed two rivals up as a tag team to wrestle another pair of rivals. The show included four additional matches.

== Production ==
=== Background ===
Wrestler-turned-promoter Adolfo "Pirata" Moreno began promoting wrestling shows in his native Naucalpan de Juárez, Mexico, bringing in wrestlers from Empresa Mexicana de Lucha Libre (EMLL) to Naucalpan as well as featuring wrestlers from the Mexican independent circuit. Later on he would promote shows mainly in "Arena KO Al Gusto" and served as the Universal Wrestling Association (UWA) partner, using the name Promociones Moreno as the business name for his promotional efforts. In 1977 Moreno bought the run down Arena KO Al Gusto and had Arena Naucalpan built in its place, an arena designed specifically for wrestling shows, with a maximum capacity of 2,400 spectators for the shows. Arena Naucalpan became the permanent home for Promociones Moreno, with very few shows held elsewhere.

In late 1995 Adolfo Moreno decided to create his own promotion, creating a regular roster instead of relying totally on wrestlers from other promotions, creating the International Wrestling Revolution Group (IWRG; sometimes referred to as Grupo Internacional Revolución in Spanish) on January 1, 1996. From that point on Arena Naucalpan became the main venue for IWRG, hosting the majority of their weekly shows and all of their major shows as well. The first IWRG Anniversary Show was held on January 1, 1997 with all subsequent shows being held on or right after January 1 each year, all at Arena Naucalpan.

The Parejas Increíbles concept is a long-standing tradition in lucha libre and is at times referred to as a "strange bedfellows" match in English speaking countries, because a Pareja Increible consists of a face (referred to as a técnico in Lucha Libre, or a "good guy") and a heel (a rudo, those that portray "the bad guys") teamed up for a specific match. At times the match is billed as a Relevo Suicida when the losing team is then forced to wrestle each other in a Lucha de Apuestas, or bet match, for their masks or hair. In the case of the main event of the IWRG 6th Anniversary Show that does not appear to be the case as there are no records of the two losing team members wrestling each other.

=== Storylines ===
The event featured five professional wrestling matches with different wrestlers involved in pre-existing scripted feuds, plots and storylines. Wrestlers were portrayed as either heels (referred to as rudos in Mexico, those that portray the "bad guys") or faces (técnicos in Mexico, the "good guy" characters) as they followed a series of tension-building events, which culminated in a wrestling match or series of matches.

IWRG had originally introduced Último Vampiro in the mid-to-late 1990s, but the wrestler under the mask gave up the role and moved on to using different names. In 1997 IWRG reintroduced the Último Vampiro with an a third wrestler under the mask. In 2000 that wrestler was given a new character, "Super Mega" and IWRG introduced yet another Último Vampiro who only used the name for a short time before IWRG introduced the fifth version of Último Vampiro. That Último Vampiro would go on to win the IWRG Intercontinental Middleweight Championship a total of four times between March 25, 2001 and 2004.

== Event ==
In the opening match low ranked masked wrestler El Príncipe de Fuego defeated La Sombra (Note: This was not Manny Andrade who would later use the La Sombra name as well.) in a best two-out-of-three-falls singles match. The second match of the night was a best two-out-of-three-falls tag team match where the team of Capitán Sangre and Guerrillero defeated Meteoro and Star Boy two falls to one. The third match of the night was the first traditional lucha libre best two-out-of-three-falls six-man tag team match of the show and saw veteran wrestler Rambo team up with the rudo duo known as Los Oficiales ("The Officials"; Guardia and Oficial) to defeat Black Dragón, Fantasy and Mike Segura. The fourth match featured a trio known as Los Medicos (Cirujano, Dr. Cerebro and Paramédico) taking on and defeating Los Megas (Mega, Súper Mega and Ultra Mega) in a Lumberjack Strap match. This meant that the wrestlers from the first three matches were on the floor outside the ring, tasked with keeping the wrestlers in the ring. Each of these "lumberjacks" were given a leather strap to use on the participants if they left the ring during the match.

In the main event Relevos Increibles match long running rivals El Pantera and Pentagón Black got along long enough to defeat Bombero Infernal and Último Vampiro two falls to one.

== Aftermath ==
On January 24, 2002 Último Vampiro V lost the IWRG Intercontinental Middleweight Championship to Pantera in a match where Pantera and the third participant Pentagón Black both risked their masks on the outcome of the match while Último Vampiro V risked his championship. While Bombero Infernal and Último Vampiro did not face off after losing the Relevos Increibles match, the two did face off in a Lucha de Apuestas match the following year, as the main event of the IWRG 7th Anniversary Show where Último Vampiro pinned Bombero Infernal, forcing Bombero Infernal to have all his hair shaved off as a result.

== Results ==
No.	Results	Stipulations
1	El Príncipe de Fuego defeated La Sombra	Best two-out-of-three-falls singles match
2	Capitán Sangre and Guerrillero defeated Meteoro and Star Boy	Best two-out-of-three-falls tag team match
3	Rambo and Los Oficiales (Guardia and Oficial) defeated Black Dragón, Fantasy and Mike Segura	Best two-out-of-three-falls six-man tag team match
4	Los Medicos (Cirujano, Dr. Cerebro and Paramédico) defeated Los Megas (Mega, Súper Mega and Ultra Mega)	Lumberjack Strap match
5	El Pantera and Pentagón Black defeated Bombero Infernal and Último Vampiro	Relevos Increibles match
