= Guerra del Golfo (January 2009) =

2009 International Wrestling Revolution Group event

Guerra del Golfo (January 2009) IWRG 13th Anniversary Show
- Official poster
- Promotion: International Wrestling Revolution Group
- Date: January 1, 2009
- City: Naucalpan, State of Mexico
- Venue: Arena Naucalpan

Event chronology
← Previous; El Castillo del Terror	Next → México vs. El Resto del Mundo

Guerra del Golfo chronology
← Previous; 2008	Next → September 2009

IWRG Anniversary Shows chronology
← Previous; 12th Anniversary	Next → 14th Anniversary

Guerra del Golfo (January 2009) (Spanish for "Gulf War") was a major annual professional wrestling event produced by Mexican professional wrestling promotion International Wrestling Revolution Group (IWRG), which took place on January 1, 2009 in Arena Naucalpan, Naucalpan, State of Mexico, Mexico. The annual Guerra del Golfo main event consists of three matches in total, with two "qualifying matches", multi-man steel cage matches where the last person left in the cage advances to the main event of the night. The two losers would then be forced to wrestle inside the steel cage, with the loser of that match being forced to either take off their wrestling mask or have their hair shaved off under Lucha de Apuestas, or "Bet match" rules, if they are unmasked. The Event was also the celebration of the 13th IWRG Anniversary Show.

== Production ==
=== Background ===
Starting as far back as at least 2000, the Mexican wrestling promotion International Wrestling Revolution Group (IWRG; Sometimes referred to as Grupo Internacional Revolución in Spanish) has held several annual events where the main event was a multi-man steel cage match where the last wrestler left in the cage would be forced to either remove their wrestling mask or have their hair shaved off under Lucha de Apuestas, or "bet match", rules. From 2005 IWRG has promoted a spring time show promoting the steel cage match concept under the name Guerra del Golfo, or "Gulf War", referring to the Gulf of Mexico, not the Gulf War in the middle east. The Gurerra del Golfo shows featured two "qualifying" steel cage matches where the loser would later be forced to face off against each other in the main event of the show, a final cage match where the loser would be forced to either unmask or have his/her hair shaved off. The use of the steel cage in three matches distinguishes the Guerra del Golfo event from other Steel cage matches held throughout the year such as the IWRG El Castillo del Terror ("The Tower of Terror"), IWRG Guerra de Sexos ("War of the Sexes") or IWRG Prison Fatal ("Deadly Prison") shows. The Guerra del Golfo shows, as well as the majority of the IWRG shows in general, are held in "Arena Naucalpan", owned by the promoters of IWRG and their main arena. The September 2009 Guerra del Golfo show was the third year IWRG promoted a show under that name and the second year in a row since becoming an annual event from 2008 forward. 2009 was the only year to date where IWRG held two Guerra del Golfo shows in a year, as they would also hold a Guerro del Golfo show in September 2009.

The 2009 Guerra del Golfo show also commemorated the 12th anniversary of IWRG's creation as a wrestling promotion and holding their first show on January 1, 1996. The Anniversary Shows generally take place on January 1 each year whenever possible.

=== Storylines ===
The event featured six professional wrestling matches with different wrestlers involved in pre-existing scripted feuds, plots and storylines. Wrestlers were portrayed as either heels (referred to as rudos in Mexico, those that portray the "bad guys") or faces (técnicos in Mexico, the "good guy" characters) as they followed a series of tension-building events, which culminated in a wrestling match or series of matches.

== Event ==
After both men lost a steel cage match, long time friends and tag team partners Cerebro Negro and Dr. Cerebro were forced to face off in the final match of the night, with the loser being shaved bald. Before the fought both men discussed that they were so good friends that they did not want to fight, each of them offering to just be shaved bald. Then they suggested that the two of them could face Pirata Morgan Jr and Pirata Mogan in a different Luchas de Apuestas, or bet match, between the two teams. In the end the local wrestling commission insisted that they wrestled each other, which led to the two wrestling a clean, scientific match that Dr. Cerebro ended up winning, forcing Cerebro Negro to be shaved bald.

== Results ==
No.	Results	Stipulations	Times
1	Trauma II defeated Imperio Azteca	Best two-out-of-three falls	12:19
2	Oficial AK-47 and Trauma I defeated Los Gemelo Fantasticos (I and II)	Best two-out-of-three falls tag team match	14:30
3	Tóxico and Los Oficiales (Oficial Fierro and Oficial 911) defeated Chico Che, Trauma II and Zatura	Best two-out-of-three falls six-man "Lucha Libre rules" tag team match	—
4	Capitán Muerte, King Drako, Némesis, Pirata Morgan Jr. and Veneno defeated Dr. Cerebro	La Guerra del Golfo semi-finals - sight-man steel cage match	17:32
5	Barba Roja, Jack, Multifacético, Péndulo and Tetsuya Bushi defeated Cerebro Negro	La Guerra del Golfo semi-finals - six-man steel cage match	22:10
6	Dr. Cerebro defeated Cerebro Negro	La Guerra del Golfo finals - Steel Cage, Luchas de Apuestas, hair vs. hair match	05:13
