= Arena Naucalpan 24th Anniversary Show =

2001 International Wrestling Revolution Group event

- Promotion: International Wrestling Revolution Group
- Date: December 20, 2001
- City: Naucalpan, State of Mexico
- Venue: Arena Naucalpan

Event chronology
← Previous; IWRG 5th Anniversary Show	Next → IWRG 6th Anniversary Show

Arena Naucalpan Anniversary Show chronology
← Previous; 23rd Anniversary	Next → 25th Anniversary

The Arena Naucalpan 24th Anniversary Show was a major annual professional wrestling event produced and scripted by the Mexican professional wrestling promotion International Wrestling Revolution Group (IWRG), which took place on December 20, 2001 in Arena Naucalpan, Naucalpan, State of Mexico, Mexico. As the name implies the show celebrated the 24th Anniversary of the construction of Arena Naucalpan, IWRG's main venue in 1977. The show is IWRG's longest-running show, predating IWRG being founded in 1996 and is the fourth oldest, still held annual show in professional wrestling.

The main event of the show was a Lucha de Apuestas, or "bet match" with both Último Vampiro and El Enterrador putting their wrestling masks on the line. Último Vampiro won the match and forced El Enterrador to remove his mask and reveal his birth name as per lucha libre traditions. The semi-main event was a special father/son tag team match with Scorpio and Scorpio Jr. defeating Tinieblas and Tinieblas Jr. The show featured three additional matches.

== Production ==
=== Background ===
The location at Calle Jardín 19, Naucalpan Centro, 53000 Naucalpan de Juárez, México, Mexico was originally an indoor roller rink for the locals in the late part of the 1950s known as "Cafe Algusto". By the early-1960s, the building was sold and turned into "Arena KO Al Gusto" and became a local lucha libre or professional wrestling arena, with a ring permanently set up in the center of the building. Promoter Adolfo Moreno began holding shows on a regular basis from the late 1960s, working with various Mexican promotions such as Empresa Mexicana de Lucha Libre (EMLL) to bring lucha libre to Naucalpan. By the mid-1970s the existing building was so run down that it was no longer suitable for hosting any events. Moreno bought the old build and had it demolished, building Arena Naucalpan on the same location, becoming the permanent home of Promociones Moreno. Arena Naucalpan opened its doors for the first lucha libre show on December 17, 1977. From that point on the arena hosted regular weekly shows for Promociones Moreno and also hosted EMLL and later Universal Wrestling Association (UWA) on a regular basis. In the 1990s the UWA folded and Promociones Moreno worked primarily with EMLL, now rebranded as Consejo Mundial de Lucha Libre (CMLL).

In late 1995 Adolfo Moreno decided to create his own promotion, creating a regular roster instead of relying totally on wrestlers from other promotions, creating the International Wrestling Revolution Group (IWRG; sometimes referred to as Grupo Internacional Revolución in Spanish) on January 1, 1996. From that point on Arena Naucalpan became the main venue for IWRG, hosting the majority of their weekly shows and all of their major shows as well. While IWRG was a fresh start for the Moreno promotion they kept the annual Arena Naucalpan Anniversary Show tradition alive, making it the only IWRG show series that actually preceded their foundation. The Arena Naucalpan Anniversary Show is the fourth oldest still ongoing annual show in professional wrestling, the only annual shows that older are the Consejo Mundial de Lucha Libre Anniversary Shows (started in 1934), the Arena Coliseo Anniversary Show (first held in 1943), and the Aniversario de Arena México (first held in 1957).=

=== Storylines ===
The event featured five professional wrestling matches with different wrestlers involved in pre-existing scripted feuds, plots and storylines. Wrestlers were portrayed as either heels (referred to as rudos in Mexico, those that portray the "bad guys") or faces (técnicos in Mexico, the "good guy" characters) as they followed a series of tension-building events, which culminated in a wrestling match or series of matches.

The Último Vampiro had been used by IWRG promoters since the 1990s and had been used by several wrestlers over time. Since Último Vampiro was masked it was easier to replace the man under the mask and not officially acknowledge this at the time. By late IWRG was on their fifth version of Último Vampiro. This version of Último Vampiro had won the IWRG Intercontinental Middleweight Championship by defeating Bombero Infernal on March 25, 2001.

In 2000 IWRG brought in the masked characters "El Enterrador" ("The Deadman") and Crypta ("The Krypt"), creating a regular Trios team with Bombero Infernal. The trio defeated Super Caló, Alan and Chris Stone to win the Distrito Federal Trios Championship on September 29, 2000. The team held on to the championship for 136 days, before losing the title to Los Oficiales (Guardia, Oficial and Vigilante) on February 11, 2001.

== Event ==
The opening match saw the tag team of Capitan Sangre and Principe de Fuego defeat Multifacético and Guerra C-3 ("War C-3"), which was a character based on the Star Wars character C-3PO.

The semi-main event, the fourth match of the show, featured two teams of fathers and sons teaming up as Scorpio and Scorpio Jr. took on the masked father/son duo of Tinieblas and Tinieblas Jr. Scorpio Jr. was a regular for IWRG, who was in the middle of a long running storyline with Tinieblas Jr. For the Arena Naucalpan 24th Anniversary Show both their father came out of semi-retirement to team up with their sons. In the end, Scorpo and Scorpio Jr. won the match.

In the main event of the Arena Naucalpan 24th Anniversary Show Último Vampiro defeated El Enterrador, winning his first ever Lucha de Apuestas match under the "Último Vampiro" name. As a result, his opponent was forced to unmask and reveal his real name per Lucha de Apuestas traditions.

== Aftermath ==
In 2002 Guerra C-3 would change his ring character, adopting the name he would be best known under, Cerebro Negro ("Black Brain"). On August 29, 2002 Scorpio Jr. defeated Tinieblas Jr. to regain the IWRG Intercontinental Heavyweight Championship. Scorpio Jr. would later lose the title to the man who was unmasked in the main event of the Arena Naucalpan 24th Anniversary Show, El Enterrador.

== Results ==
No.	Results	Stipulations
1	Capitan Sangre and Principe de Fuego defeated Guerra C-3 and Multifacético	Best two-out-of-three-falls tag team match
2	Los Payasos Tricolor (Coco Blanco, Coco Rojo and Coco Verde) defeated Los Megas (Mega, Super Mega and Ultra Mega)	Best two-out-of-three-falls six-man tag team match
3	Black Dragon, Blue Demon Jr. and El Pantera defeated Blue Panther, Bombero Infernal and Pentagón Black	Best two-out-of-three-falls six-man tag team match
4	Scorpio and Scorpio Jr. defeated Tinieblas and Tinieblas Jr.	Best two-out-of-three-falls tag team match
5	Último Vampiro defeated El Enterrador	Best two-out-of-three-falls Lucha de Apuestas, mask vs, mask, match
