= Arena Naucalpan 23rd Anniversary Show =

2000 International Wrestling Revolution Group event

- Promotion: International Wrestling Revolution Group
- Date: December 17, 2000
- City: Naucalpan, State of Mexico
- Venue: Arena Naucalpan

Event chronology
← Previous; El Castillo del Terror	Next → IWRG 5th Anniversary Show

Arena Naucalpan Anniversary Show chronology
← Previous; 22nd Anniversary	Next → 24th Anniversary

The Arena Naucalpan 23rd Anniversary Show was a major annual professional wrestling event produced and scripted by the Mexican professional wrestling promotion International Wrestling Revolution Group (IWRG), which took place on December 17, 2000 in Arena Naucalpan, Naucalpan, State of Mexico, Mexico. As the name implies the show celebrated the 23rd Anniversary of the construction of Arena Naucalpan, IWRG's main venue in 1977. The show is IWRG's longest-running show, predating IWRG being founded in 1996 and is the fourth oldest, still held annual show in professional wrestling.

In the main event of the show Último Vampiro ("The Last Vampire") defeated Oficial in a Lucha de Apuestas, mask vs. mask match, forcing Oficial to unmask and state his birth name per lucha libre traditions. In the semi-main event match Los Megas (Mega and Super Mega) successfully defended the IWRG Intercontinental Tag Team Championship against the tag team of Fantasy and Star Boy

== Production ==
=== Background ===
The location at Calle Jardín 19, Naucalpan Centro, 53000 Naucalpan de Juárez, México, Mexico was originally an indoor roller rink for the locals in the late part of the 1950s known as "Cafe Algusto". By the early-1960s, the building was sold and turned into "Arena KO Al Gusto" and became a local lucha libre or professional wrestling arena, with a ring permanently set up in the center of the building. Promoter Adolfo Moreno began holding shows on a regular basis from the late 1960s, working with various Mexican promotions such as Empresa Mexicana de Lucha Libre (EMLL) to bring lucha libre to Naucalpan. By the mid-1970s the existing building was so run down that it was no longer suitable for hosting any events. Moreno bought the old build and had it demolished, building Arena Naucalpan on the same location, becoming the permanent home of Promociones Moreno. Arena Naucalpan opened its doors for the first lucha libre show on December 17, 1977. From that point on the arena hosted regular weekly shows for Promociones Moreno and also hosted EMLL and later Universal Wrestling Association (UWA) on a regular basis. In the 1990s the UWA folded and Promociones Moreno worked primarily with EMLL, now rebranded as Consejo Mundial de Lucha Libre (CMLL).

In late 1995 Adolfo Moreno decided to create his own promotion, creating a regular roster instead of relying totally on wrestlers from other promotions, creating the International Wrestling Revolution Group (IWRG; sometimes referred to as Grupo Internacional Revolución in Spanish) on January 1, 1996. From that point on Arena Naucalpan became the main venue for IWRG, hosting the majority of their weekly shows and all of their major shows as well. While IWRG was a fresh start for the Moreno promotion they kept the annual Arena Naucalpan Anniversary Show tradition alive, making it the only IWRG show series that actually preceded their foundation. The Arena Naucalpan Anniversary Show is the fourth oldest still ongoing annual show in professional wrestling, the only annual shows that older are the Consejo Mundial de Lucha Libre Anniversary Shows (started in 1934), the Arena Coliseo Anniversary Show (first held in 1943), and the Aniversario de Arena México (first held in 1957).=

=== Storylines ===
The event featured five professional wrestling matches with different wrestlers involved in pre-existing scripted feuds, plots and storylines. Wrestlers were portrayed as either heels (referred to as rudos in Mexico, those that portray the "bad guys") or faces (técnicos in Mexico, the "good guy" characters) as they followed a series of tension-building events, which culminated in a wrestling match or series of matches.

IWRG created the team known as Los Megas (Mega and Super Mega) in early 2000, creating a brightly colored, kid-friendly técnico team. On October 29, 2000 Los Megas defeated Fantasy and Star Boy to win the IWRG Intercontinental Tag Team Championship. The former champions were granted a rematch on Arena Naucalpan 23rd Anniversary Show.

== Event ==
The main event of the Arena Naucalpan 23rd Anniversary Show had both Último Vampiro and Oficial put their mask on the line in a best two-out-of-three-falls Lucha de Apuestas, mask vs. mask match. Oficial had one of his Los Oficiales partners in his corner while records are unclear who worked as Último Vampiro's corner man on the night. Despite having another member of Los Oficiales in his corner Oficial was unable to defeat Último Vampiro and lost the third and deciding fall. Initially, Oficial tried to run away from the ring to avoid being unmasked, but the local lucha libre commissioner threatened to ban Oficial for life if he did not unmask. Moments later Oficial removed his mask and revealed that his birth name was Jose Ramirez Barron.

== Aftermath ==
In early 2001 the original Super Mega was replaced by the man who had won the main event of the Arena Naucalpan 23rd Anniversary Show as Último Vampiro took over the character. IWRG opted to late introduce a fourth version of Último Vampiro and later on a fifth Último Vampiro as well. Los Megas would successfully defend the IWRG Intercontinental Tag Team Championship in several occasions until they lost the championship to Nowasa and Masada on June 10, 2001. The new version of Los Megas would soon be joined by Ultra Mega. Together they would win both the IWRG Intercontinental Trios Championship and the Distrito Federal Trios Championship.

== Results ==
No.	Results	Stipulations
1	Cat Man and Rockero del Diablo defeated Avisman II and Carta Brava	Best two-out-of-three-falls tag team match
2	Avisman I, Super Yens and Zonik vs. Bestia Rubia, Cirujano and El Millionario ended in a double disqualification	Best two-out-of-three-falls six-man tag team match
3	Cyborg, El Hijo del Diablo, Negro Navarro and Shu El Guerrero defeated Ciclon Ramirez, Mike Segura, Silver King and Super Parka	Best two-out-of-three-falls eight-man tag team match
4	Los Megas (Mega and Super Mega) (c) defeated Fantasy and Star Boy	Best two-out-of-three-falls tag team match for the IWRG Intercontinental Tag Team Championship
5	Último Vampiro defeated Oficial	Best two-out-of-three-falls Lucha de Apuestas, mask vs. mask match
(c) / – the champion(s) heading into the match
