= IWRG La Jaula del Honor =

2011 International Wrestling Revolution Group event

- Official poster with all three main event teams shown
- Promotion: International Wrestling Revolution Group
- Date: February 17, 2011
- City: Naucalpan, State of Mexico
- Venue: Arena Naucalpan

Event chronology
← Previous; Junior de Juniors	Next → La Epoca de Oro

La Jaula del Honor (Spanish for "The Cage of Honor") was a major professional wrestling event produced by the International Wrestling Revolution Group (IWRG), that took place on February 17, 2011, at Arena Naucalpan in Naucalpan, State of Mexico. The title of the event, La Jaula del Honor, referred to the main event match, a steel cage match that involved three, three-man teams contested under elimination rules. A wrestler would "escape" the match by climbing up the side of the cage and out, with the last remaining wrestler in the cage, along with his teammates. being deemed the loser of the match. The three factions in the main event represented three different professional wrestling promotions, IWRG represented by Los Oficiales (Oficial 911, Oficial AK-47 and Oficial Fierro), Perros del Mal, represented by Bestia 666, Damian 666 and Halloween and Asistencia Asesoria y Administracion (AAA) represented by Los Psycho Circus (Monster Clown, Murder Clown and Psycho Clown). In all cases the "inter-promotional rivalry" was based on storylines and not actual animosity.

== Background ==
The event featured four professional wrestling matches with different wrestlers, where some were involved in pre-existing scripted feuds or storylines and others simply put together by the matchmakers without a backstory. Being a professional wrestling event matches are not won legitimately through athletic competition; they are instead won via predetermined outcomes to the matches that is kept secret from the general public. Wrestlers portray either heels (the bad guys, referred to as Rudos in Mexico) or faces (fan favorites or Técnicos in Mexico).

== Results ==
#	Result	Stipulation	Reference
1	Lucky Boy besiegt Imperial – two falls to zero	Two Out Of Three Falls Match	
2	Carta Brava, Jr., Comando Negro and Imposible defeated Alan Extreme, Eterno and Explosivo – two falls to one	Best two-out-of-three falls six-man trios match	
3	La Dinastia de la Muerte (Negro Navarro, Trauma I and Trauma II) defeated Los Piratas (Barba Roja, El Hijo de Pirata Morgan and Pirata Morgan) – two falls to one	Best two-out-of-three falls six-man trios match	
4	Los Perros del Mal (Bestia 666, Damian 666 and Halloween) and Los Psycho Circus (Monster Clown, Murder Clown and Psycho Clown) defeated Los Oficiales (Oficial 911, Oficial AK-47 and Oficial Fierro)	La Jaula del Honor, Nine-man, three-team, steel cage match	
