= IWRG 23rd Anniversary Show =

2019 International Wrestling Revolution Group event

- Poster for the event advertising the 5 steel cage matches
- Date: January 1, 2019
- City: Naucalpan, State of Mexico
- Venue: Arena Naucalpan

Event chronology
← Previous; Arena Naucalpan 41st Anniversary Show	Next → Zona de Ejecucion

IWRG Anniversary Show chronology
← Previous; 22nd Anniversary	Next → 24th Anniversary

The IWRG 23rd Anniversary Show was a major annual lucha libre supercard produced and scripted by the Mexican International Wrestling Revolution Group (IWRG) professional wrestling promotion that took place on January 1, 2019. The show was held in Arena Naucalpan, Naucalpan, State of Mexico, which is IWRG's primary venue. As the name indicates the event commemorates the anniversary of IWRG, which was founded on January 1, 1996.

All matches on the show were held inside a steel cage match, for some matches combining that stipulation with a second stipulation as well. In the main event Máscara Año 2000 Jr. defeated Toscano in a Lucha de Apuestas, or "bet match", and as a result Toscano was shaved bald. Also on the show Los Oficiales (Oficial 911 and Oficial AK-47) won the IWRG Intercontinental Tag Team Championship from Capo del Norte and Capo del Sur in a three-way match where Heddi Karaoui and Zumbi managed to retain their TWS Tag Team Championship. Dragon Bane successfully defended the IWRG Reyes del Aire championship against Rey Horus and in the opener Atomic Star defeated Güero in a "Battle of the Schools" battle royal, which meant Güero had all his hair shaved off.

== Production ==
=== Background ===
Wrestler-turned-promoter Adolfo "Pirata" Moreno began promoting wrestling shows in his native Naucalpan de Juárez, Mexico, bringing in wrestlers from Empresa Mexicana de Lucha Libre (EMLL) to Naucalpan as well as featuring wrestlers from the Mexican independent circuit. Later on he would promote shows mainly in "Arena KO Al Gusto" and served as the Universal Wrestling Association (UWA) partner, using the name Promociones Moreno as the business name for his promotional efforts. In 1977 Moreno bought the rundown Arena KO Al Gusto and had Arena Naucalpan built in its place, an arena designed specifically for wrestling shows, with a maximum capacity of 2,400 spectators for the shows. Arena Naucalpan became the permanent home for Promociones Moreno, with very few shows held elsewhere.

In late 1995 Adolfo Moreno decided to create his own promotion, creating a regular roster instead of relying totally on wrestlers from other promotions, creating the International Wrestling Revolution Group (IWRG; sometimes referred to as Grupo Internacional Revolución in Spanish) on January 1, 1996. From that point on Arena Naucalpan became the main venue for IWRG, hosting the majority of their weekly shows and all of their major shows as well. The first IWRG Anniversary Show was held on January 1, 1997 with all subsequent shows being held on or right after January 1 each year, all at Arena Naucalpan.

=== Storylines ===
The event featured five professional wrestling matches with different wrestlers involved in pre-existing scripted feuds, plots and storylines. Wrestlers were portrayed as either heels (referred to as rudos in Mexico, those that portray the "bad guys") or faces (técnicos in Mexico, the "good guy" characters) as they followed a series of tension-building events, which culminated in a wrestling match or series of matches.

For this special event every single match took place inside a steel cage that was erected around the ring, a concept that IWRG also used for their 22nd Anniversary Show that also featured 5 steel cage matches combined with other stipulations.

== Results ==
No.	Results	Stipulations
1	Atomic Star defeated Güero The teams in the cage were: Team IWRG (Death Metal, Chicanito and Atomic Star), Lucha Libre Boom (Kid Jaguar, Divino and Juan Diego), Lucha Memes (Psique, Mamacitas and Puercules), Saetas del Aire (Flyman, Flyman II and Gallito Colorado), an. Gym Zeus (Cuero Palma, Taurino and Marduk)	"Battle of the schools" Lucha de Apuestas steel cage match
2	Dragon Bane (c) defeated Rey Horus	Steel cage match for the IWRG Reyes del Aire Championship
3	Los Oficiales (Oficial 911 and Oficial AK-47) defeated Capo del Norte and Capo del Sur (c-IWRG) and Heddi Karaoui and Zumbi (c-TWS)	Steel cage match for the IWRG Intercontinental Tag Team Championship and the TWS Tag Team Championship
4	Las Tortugas Ninjas (Mike and Leo) defeated Las Tortugas Negras (Ra-Zhata and Shil-Kah), Dinamic Black and Eragon, Freelance and Relámpago	#1 contenders for the IWRG Intercontinental Tag Team Championship steel cage match
5	Máscara Año 2000 Jr. defeated Toscano	Luchas de Apuestas, hair vs. hair, chain steel cage match
(c) / – the champion(s) heading into the match
