= Cinco Luchas en Jaula =

2020 professional wrestling event

Cinco Luchas en Jaula; (IWRG 24th Anniversary Show)
- Poster for the event advertising the 5 steel cage matches
- Date: January 1, 2020
- City: Naucalpan, State of Mexico
- Venue: Arena Naucalpan

Event chronology
← Previous; La Ruleta de la Muerte Máscaras	Next → Rey del Ring

IWRG Anniversary Show chronology
← Previous; 23rd Anniversary	Next → —

The Cinco Luchas en Jaula (Spanish for "Five matches in cages") was a professional wrestling supercard produced and scripted by the Mexican International Wrestling Revolution Group (IWRG) professional wrestling promotion that took take place on January 1, 2020. The show will be held in Arena Naucalpan, Naucalpan, State of Mexico, IWRG's primary venue and will also double as the IWRG 24th Anniversary Show, commemorating the anniversary of IWRG, which was founded on January 1, 1996.

As the name indicates, all five matches on the show were steel cage matches. In the main event Demonio Infernal defeated Fuerza Guerrera Nueva Generacion, Pasión Cristal, Emperador Azteca, and El Hijo del Alebrije for the "Briefcase of Glory" and the vacant IWRG Intercontinental Middleweight Championship. On the undercard, Toxin won the newly created IWRG Mexico Championship by outlasting Lunatik Xtreme, Dragón Bane, Trauma II, Relámpago, and Puma de Oro to win the championship. Also on the show, Death Metal and Ketzal were both forced to unmask after losing a steel cage Lucha de Apuestas (bet match) while Rocket was shaved bald as a result of his loss.

== Production ==
=== Background ===
Wrestler-turned-promoter Adolfo "Pirata" Moreno began promoting wrestling shows in his native Naucalpan de Juárez, Mexico, bringing in wrestlers from Empresa Mexicana de Lucha Libre (EMLL) to Naucalpan as well as featuring wrestlers from the Mexican independent circuit. Later on he would promote shows mainly in "Arena KO Al Gusto" and served as the Universal Wrestling Association (UWA) partner, using the name Promociones Moreno as the business name for his promotional efforts. In 1977 Moreno bought the rundown Arena KO Al Gusto and had Arena Naucalpan built in its place, an arena designed specifically for wrestling shows, with a maximum capacity of 2,400 spectators for the shows. Arena Naucalpan became the permanent home for Promociones Moreno, with very few shows held elsewhere.

In late 1995 Adolfo Moreno decided to create his own promotion, creating a regular roster instead of relying totally on wrestlers from other promotions, creating the International Wrestling Revolution Group (IWRG; sometimes referred to as Grupo Internacional Revolución in Spanish) on January 1, 1996. From that point on Arena Naucalpan became the main venue for IWRG, hosting the majority of their weekly shows and all of their major shows as well. The first IWRG Anniversary Show was held on January 1, 1997, with all subsequent shows being held on or right after January 1 each year, all at Arena Naucalpan.

=== Storylines ===
The event featured five professional wrestling matches with different wrestlers involved in pre-existing scripted feuds, plots and storylines. Wrestlers were portrayed as either heels (referred to as rudos in Mexico, those that portray the "bad guys") or faces (técnicos in Mexico, the "good guy" characters) as they followed a series of tension-building events, which culminated in a wrestling match or series of matches.

== Matches ==
No.	Results	Stipulations
1	Legendario defeated Ketzal; Also in the match: Marado, Auzter, Dinámico, Torito Negro, Dick Angelo 3G, and Spider Fly	Steel cage match
2	Chicanito defeated Rocker; Also in the match: Ángel Tormenta, Ángel Estrella Jr., Noicy Boy, Águila Oriental, and Canival	Lucha de Apuestas, mask vs. hair, Steel cage match
3	Black Dragón defeated Death Metal; Also in the match: El Hijo de Canis Lupus, Trauma I, Capo del Norte, Diva Salvaje, Big Chico Che, Fly Warrior, Jessy Ventura, Big Ovett, Oficial Fierro, and Oficial AK-47	Lucha de Apuestas, mask vs. hair, Steel cage match
4	Toxin defeated Lunatik Xtreme, Dragón Bane, Trauma II, Relámpago, and Puma de Oro	Steel cage ladder match for the Mexico Championship
5	Demonio Infernal defeated Fuerza Guerrera Nueva Generacion, Pasion Cristal, Ave Rex, Emperador Azteca, El Hijo del Alebrije	Steel cage match for the "Briefcase of Glory" and the vacant IWRG Intercontinental Middleweight Championship
