= IWRG 22nd Anniversary Show =

2018 International Wrestling Revolution Group event

- Poster for the event advertising the 5 steel cage matches
- Date: January 1, 2018
- City: Naucalpan, State of Mexico
- Venue: Arena Naucalpan

Event chronology
← Previous; Arena Naucalpan 40th Anniversary Show	Next → Zona de Ejecucion

IWRG Anniversary Show chronology
← Previous; 21st Anniversary	Next → 23rd Anniversary

The IWRG 22nd Anniversary Show was a major annual lucha libre event produced and scripted by the Mexican International Wrestling Revolution Group (IWRG) professional wrestling promotion on January 1, 2018. The show was held in Arena Naucalpan, Naucalpan, State of Mexico, which is IWRG's primary venue. As the name indicates the event commemorates the anniversary of IWRG, which was founded on January 1, 1996.

All matches on the show were held inside a steel cage match, combining that stipulation with a second stipulation as well. The main event saw Imposible defend the IWRG Rey del Ring Championship against Dr. Cerebro where the steel cage stipulation was combined with a ladder match. The show also featured two Luchas de Apuestas, or "bet matches" where X-Corp and Obett both had their hair shaved off as a result of their losses. The event introduced the IWRG Rey del Aire Championship ("King of the Air") and saw Aramís crowned as the first champion.

== Production ==
=== Background ===
Wrestler-turned-promoter Adolfo "Pirata" Moreno began promoting wrestling shows in his native Naucalpan de Juárez, Mexico, bringing in wrestlers from Empresa Mexicana de Lucha Libre (EMLL) to Naucalpan as well as featuring wrestlers from the Mexican independent circuit. Later on he would promote shows mainly in "Arena KO Al Gusto" and served as the Universal Wrestling Association (UWA) partner, using the name Promociones Moreno as the business name for his promotional efforts. In 1977 Moreno bought the rundown Arena KO Al Gusto and had Arena Naucalpan built in its place, an arena designed specifically for wrestling shows, with a maximum capacity of 2,400 spectators for the shows. Arena Naucalpan became the permanent home for Promociones Moreno, with very few shows held elsewhere.

In late 1995 Adolfo Moreno decided to create his own promotion, creating a regular roster instead of relying totally on wrestlers from other promotions, creating the International Wrestling Revolution Group (IWRG; sometimes referred to as Grupo Internacional Revolución in Spanish) on January 1, 1996. From that point on Arena Naucalpan became the main venue for IWRG, hosting the majority of their weekly shows and all of their major shows as well. The first IWRG Anniversary Show was held on January 1, 1997 with all subsequent shows being held on or right after January 1 each year, all at Arena Naucalpan.

=== Storylines ===
The event featured five professional wrestling matches with different wrestlers involved in pre-existing scripted feuds, plots and storylines. Wrestlers were portrayed as either heels (referred to as rudos in Mexico, those that portray the "bad guys") or faces (técnicos in Mexico, the "good guy" characters) as they followed a series of tension-building events, which culminated in a wrestling match or series of matches. For this special event every single match took place inside a steel cage that was erected around the ring.

== Results ==
No.	Results	Stipulations
1	Cadillac and Chicanito and Diablo Jr. and Dragon Bane and Fulgor II and Guerrero 2000 and Motocross and Ram El Carnero and Lunatik Xtreme defeated X-Corpio	Lucha de Apuestas, mask vs. hair steel cage match
2	Aramís defeated Alas de Acero and Black Dragon and Dinamic Black and Emperador Azteca and Fly Warrior and Freelance and Septimo Rayo	Steel cage match for the IWRG Rey del Aire Championship
3	Chico Che defeated Obett	Lucha de Apuestas, hair vs. hair steel cage match
4	Las Traumas (Trauma I and Trauma II) defeated Capo del Norte and Capo del Sur and Danny Casas and Veneno and Rokambole Jr. and Villano V Jr.	Steel cage match, IWRG Intercontinental Tag Team Championship #1 Contendership
5	Imposible (c) defeated Dr. Cerebro	Ladder and steel cage match for the IWRG Rey del Ring Championship
(c) / – the champion(s) heading into the match
