= Los Megas =

Professional wrestling stable

Stable
- Members: Mega; Ultra Mega; Super Mega; Omega
- Debut: 2002
- Disbanded: 2004

Los Megas was a Mexican professional wrestling group, called a stable who worked as a tecnico (term used for wrestlers who portray the "good guys") faction. All members of the group started out as masked wrestlers, but all four members lost their masks before the group was disbanded.

== History ==
In 2001 International Wrestling Revolution Group (IWRG) formed a new "trio" known as Los Megas, taking three of their regular competitors and repackaging with a new image, new mask and new ring names. Cesar Caballero became known as Mega, Último Vampiro was turned into Super Mega and a wrestler known as El Milionario became known as Ultra Mega. Los Megas portrayed a kid-friendly técnico (good guys) silver-and-black-clad group. Los Megas defeated Los Oficiales (Guardia, Oficial and Vigilante) on August 2, 2001, to win the Distrito Federal Trios Championship, starting off a 161-day-long title reign. The trio was defeated for the title by Dr. Cerebro, Cirujano and Paramedico on January 10, 2002. Only a month later Mega and Ultra Mega defeated Fantasy and Star Boy to win the IWRG Intercontinental Tag Team Championship. They team held the title for 73 days until losing to MAZADA and NOZAWA. On May 19, 2002, Super Mega was forced to unmask after he lost a match to Kung Fu, Jr. Following his mask loss Super Mega left IWRG to work for Consejo Mundial de Lucha Libre (CMLL) as Último Vampiro instead. Super Mega was replaced with Omega to keep Los Megas a Trio. Mega, Ultra Mega and Omega teamed up to regain the Distrito Federal Trios Championship and held the title until December 12, 2003, where they were defeated by Dr. Markus Jr., Dr. Muerte, Enfermero Jr. Not long after Mega, Ultra Mega and Omega won the IWRG Intercontinental Trios Championship from Nosawa, Takemura and Masada. The Intercontinental Trios Championship was IWRG's top trios title, a step up from the Distrito Federal Trios title. Mega and Ultra Mega regained the IWRG Intercontinental Tag Team Championship and held the belts for almost a year, winning the titles from Fantasy and Star Boy and losing them to Dr. Cerebro and Bombero Infernal. In 2003 IWRG introduced a group designed to be the "archenemy" of Los Megas in the form of Los Comandos (Comando Mega, Comando Gama and Comando Omega), who were dark and destructive to counter Los Megas' bright, kid-friendly personas. The groups developed their rivalry for the better part of a year, escalating the tension between the two groups. Los Comandos scored a major victory in the feud when Comando Gama defeated Omega in a Lucha de Apuesta, or "Bet match" where the loser was forced to unmask. Omega removed his mask and subsequently was only used sporadically. The storyline between the two factions saw Mega and Ultra Mega gain revenge and "win" the feud by defeating Comando Mega and Comando Gama in a Lucha de Apuesta, mask vs. mask match on June 6, 2004, a match that was considered the end of the Megas Vs Comandos storyline. Following the culmination of the feud Los Megas began to fade away, being used less and less by IWRG, with long stretches of the ring characters being inactive. In October 2004 Mega and IWRG regular Black Dragon were the last two wrestlers in a steel cage match where the loser would be forced to unmask. Black Dragon got the victory and Mega was forced to unmask and reveal his real name. With two of the three members unmasked the concept lost its appeal and was quietly abandoned by the end of 2004. IWRG did not even bring Los Megas back to lose the IWRG Intercontinental Trios Championship that they held, instead opting to vacate the titles and hold a tournament for title. On December 22, 2005, Ultra Mega was one of the participants in IWRG's annual Castillo del Terror ("Castle of Terror") event, a multi-man Steel Cage Match that came down to Ultra Mega and Nemesis. The last two competitors were forced to wrestle under Lucha de Apuesta rules in a match that Nemesis won, forcing Ultra Mega to unmask. Following his mask loss Ultra Mega turned rúdo (bad guy), but without the mask the Ultra Mega character did not succeed and was soon abandoned.

Ultra Mega would later resurface and team with former Rival Comando Gama as part of a new concept trio, Ultra Mega was renamed Oficial Fierro and Comando Gama became Oficial 911, along with Oficial AK-47 they formed Los Oficiales in 2007. Mega and Omega would team up again years after Los Megas was ended, Mega became known as Oficial Factor and Omega became known as Oficial Spartan, who along with Oficial Rayan formed Los Oficiales Elite, rivals to Los Oficiales.

In 2009 IWRG introduced in Rey del Ring a new character named Megatronic sporting an outfit and mask identical to Mega's ones, but the character was discarded immediately after that battle royal. More recently, during IWRG trainees shows appeared two luchadores named Omega jr and Ultra Mega jr that have not yet entered IWRG main shows. More and more a Mega jr debuted on independent circuit. For a few years was active also a Super Mega jr, but due to a kidney injury sustained while on training he was forced to retire in December 2019, unmasking himself after the bout and bidding farewell to audience. Due to worsening kidney problems, Super Mega jr died on March 16, 2021.

== Championships and accomplishments ==
Championships won while members of Los Megas are listed.

- International Wrestling Revolution Group
  - IWRG Intercontinental Tag Team Championship (3 times) – Mega and Ultra Mega
  - IWRG Intercontinental Trios Championship (1 time) – Mega, Ultra Mega and Omega
  - Distrito Federal Trios Championship (2 times) – Mega, Super Mega, and Ultra Mega (1), Mega, Ultra Mega and Omega (1), (Note: The title is only sanctioned for Mexico City shows but is officially recognized by IWRG.)

== Luchas de Apuestas record ==
Luchas de Apuestas participation while members of Los Megas are listed.

Winner (wager)	Loser (wager)	Location	Event	Date	Notes
Kung Fu Jr. (mask)	Super Mega (mask)	Naucalpan, Mexico State	IWRG show	May 19, 2002	(Note: Last two men in a 10 man steel cage match.)
Mega (mask)	Karma	Naucalpan, Mexico State	Castillo del Terror	October 31, 2002	
Mega (mask)	Oficial (hair)	Naucalpan, Mexico State	IWRG show	March 2, 2003	
Mega (mask)	Comando Alfa (mask)	Naucalpan, Mexico State	IWRG show	November 2, 2003	
Comando Gama (hair)	Omega (mask)	Naucalpan, Mexico State	IWRG show	February 22, 2004	(Note: Last two wrestlers in a Torneo cibernetico suicida and were forced to face off.)
Los Megas (masks) (Mega and Ultra Mega)	Los Gamas (masks) (Comando Gama and Comando Mega)	Naucalpan, Mexico State	IWRG show	June 6, 2004	
Mega (mask)	Steel Man I (mask)	Naucalpan, Mexico State	Prison Fatal	July 22, 2004	(Note: Last two men in a Prison Fatal steel cage match.)
Black Dragon (mask)	Mega (mask)	Naucalpan, Mexico State	Castillo del Terror	October 22, 2004	
Némesis (mask)	Ultra Mega (mask)	Naucalpan, Mexico State	Castillo del Terror	December 22, 2005	(Note: Last two men in a multi-man steel cage match.)
