= Tony Rivera =

Mexican professional wrestler

Personal information
- Born: Javier Espinosa Romero; December 30, 1973 (age 52) Tijuana, Baja California, Mexico
- Family: Marco Rivera (brother)

Professional wrestling career
- Ring name(s): Paris; Renegado; Tony Rivera
- Billed height: 171 cm (5 ft 7 in)
- Billed weight: 80 kg (176 lb)
- Trained by: Benny Castello; Tony Salazar
- Debut: August 4, 1994

Javier Espinosa Romero (born December 30, 1973) is a Mexican professional wrestler, best known under the ring name Tony Rivera. As Rivera he is currently working on the Mexican professional wrestling independent circuit portraying a tecnico ("Good guy") wrestling character. Rivera worked for Consejo Mundial de Lucha Libre (CMLL) for over 10 years, followed by him working on the Mexican independent circuit, particularly for International Wrestling Revolution Group (IWRG) and International Wrestling League (IWL). He originally worked as an Enmascarado or masked wrestler under the ring names Paris and Renegado ("The Renegade") but has used the name Tony Rivera since 1996. Following his departure from CMLL he became an advocate for wrestlers rights and pay, including Rivera organizing a blockade of one of CMLL's major shows, the 2011 Juicio Final.

== Professional wrestling career ==
Espinosa trained for his professional wrestling debut under Benny Castello and made his professional wrestling debut in 1994 under the ring name Paris, a masked wrestling persona. In 1995 he changed his ring persona and mask becoming known as Renegado ("The Renegade"). As Renegado he lost a Luchas de Apuestas, or bet match to Zumbido. Following the match he was forced to unmask, state his birth name and age per Lucha Libre traditions.

=== Tony Rivera (1996–present) ===
Not long after the loss of his mask Espinosa began working as "Tony Rivera", an unmasked tecnico ("Good guy") wrestling character. He also started wrestling at Consejo Mundial de Lucha Libre (CMLL) wrestling school under Tony Salazar. At the time CMLL had a talent sharing agreement with International Wrestling Revolution Group (IWRG), a local promotion, allowing CMLL wrestlers to also work for IWRG. CMLL sent several trainees to get additional ring experience, amongst those was Tony Rivera. Rivera participated in a tournament to determine the first IWRG Intercontinental Middleweight Champion. Rivera lost in the finals of the tournament to El Pantera. Later in the year Rivera, Fantasy, Mr. Águila, Neblina and Tony Rivera won the 1997 Copa Higher Power tournament, an IWRG tournament for wrestlers who were still considered "trainees" A few months later he competed in Toryumon's Young Dragon's Cup, where he made it to the finals, but was defeated.

==== Consejo Mundial de Lucha Libre (1997–2010) ====
On November 30, 1997 Tony Rivera won his first significant Luchas de Apuestas match as he defeated Reyes Veloz during a show in CMLL's Arena Coliseo, forcing Veloz to have all his hair shaved off after the match. In Lucha libre defeating an opponent in a Luchas de Apuestas match is more significant than winning championships. In June, 1998 Tony Rivera was teamed up with Emilio Charles Jr. for the 1998 Torneo Gran Alternativa ("The Great Alternative tournament") where a rookie and a veteran are teamed up for a tournament, with the concept being used to showcase younger wrestlers. In the finals Rivera and Charles defeated Bestia Salvaje and Guerrero de la Muerte to win the tournament. Only weeks later Rivera defeated Guerrero de la Muerte in a Luchas de Apuestas, forcing Guerrero de la Muerte to be shaved bald after the match. In 1999 Rivera teamed up with Emilio Charles Jr. for the Gran Alternativa tournament. The team defeated El Satánico and Violencia but lost to eventual tournament winners Blue Panther and Último Guerrero in the second round. Rivera was one of 16 competitors in a torneo cibernetico elimination match that was part of the 2000 Juicio Final ("Final Judgement") show held by CMLL on March 17, 2000. In the end Último Guerrero was the lone survivor. On May 18, 2000 Rivera defeated Súper Cacao after the two lost a Relevos Suicidas match to Brazo de Oro and Fugaz. As a result of the match Súper Cacao had all his hair shaved off. The following year Rivera would win Apuestas victories over both El Hijo del Gladiador and Brazo de Platino, leaving both men bald as a result.

CMLL had a working relationship with the regional International Wrestling Revolution Group (IWRG), which meant that wrestlers such as Rivera often traveled to Naucalpan to work for IWRG. On July 28, 2002 Rivera defeated Bombero Infernal to win the IWRG Intercontinental Middleweight Championship. He held the championship for just under a month until losing it to Último Vampiro on August 25. Rivera was one of the competitors in the sixth International Gran Prix tournament, held on March 22, 2002 in Arena Mexico. The teams were mixed Tecnicos and Rudos, seemingly randomly teamed up without any pre-existing storyline behind it. The teams were; "Team A" (Zumbido, Safari, Hombre Sin Nombre, Halloween, Volador Jr., Damián 666, Negro Casas and El Hijo del Santo) against "Team B (Rivera, El Felino, Olímpico, Máscara Mágica, Nicho El Millonario, Satánico, Averno and Mephisto). The tournament came down to Máscara Mágica and El Hijo del Santo, with Máscara Magica winning the match. Rivera held the dubious distinction of being the first man eliminated, pinned by Halloween. In 2003 Rivera was one of 10 low ranked wrestlers who competed in Guapos U ("The Hansome University") competing against El Terrible, Mr. Power, Genetico, Zumbido, Ricky Marvin, Loco Max, Alex Steel, Marshall and Caballero for membership in a group called Los Guapos ("The Hansome Ones"). The contest lasted until the 47. Aniversario de Arena Mexico show where the finals saw El Terrible and Rivera defeat Genetico and Ricky Marvin to earn their spot in the finals. In the end El Terrible pinned Rivera to become the newest Guapo. In subsequent years Rivera work lower card matches with very little fanfare until leaving CMLL in 2010.

==== The Independent Circuit (2010–present) ====
After leaving CMLL in 2010 Rivera began working for a variety of wrestling companies on the Mexican independent circuit. On December 7, 2010, Perros del Mal Producciones crowned their first ever champion, when X-Fly won a tournament that also included Bestia 666, Cósmico, Pesadilla, Ragde, Super Crazy, Tony Rivera, Turbo and Zumbi to become the first Perros del Mal Extremo Champion. Rivera also worked on a regular basis from the Naucalpan based International Wrestling Revolution Group (IWRG) with his first major show being the Arena Naucalpan 33rd Anniversary where he teamed up with El Ángel and El Pantera to defeat Los Gringos VIP (Avisman, El Hijo del Diablo and Gringo Loco). Later on he took part in IWRG's 2011 Guerra Revolucionario ("Revolutionary War") where he was one of 20 men in the eponymous Guerra Revolucionario Battle Royal won by Multifacético

On June 17, 2011 CMLL was getting ready to hold their 2011 Juicio Final ("Final Justice") show, but prior to the show Rivera orchestrated a protest, blocking the entrance to Arena México with a fleet of buses, claiming that CMLL were not paying their workers a fair wage. After initial fears that the event might be cancelled, Rivera finally ended the protest after a meeting with CMLL management. While the two sides met it was never revealed what the outcome was, but Rivera did not organize any further protests against CMLL. On January 12, 2012 Rivera was teamed up with Tritón for their annual El Protector tag team tournament, a tournament where a veteran wrestler would team up with a rookie for a one night tournament. The two lost to Carta Brava Jr. and Máscara Año 2000 Jr. in the first round of the tournament.

Rivera was one of many wrestlers who put their hair or mask on the line in IWRG's annual Guerra de Sexos ("War of the Sexes") where male and female wrestlers fight inside a steel cage, with the loser being unmasked or shaved bald. Rivera escaped the cage with Chico Che ending up bald by the end of the night. A few months later IWRG held their annual Guerra del Golfo ("Gulf War") show, again Rivera put his hair on the line, but escaped with his hair, leaving Oficial AK-47 to have his hair shaved off. In May, 2012 Rivera was one of eight men competing in a tournament for the vacant IWRG Intercontinental Middleweight Championship, Rivera would lose in the first round to The Mummy.

He also made regular appearances for the International Wrestling League (IWL), taking part in their 'Guerra de Empresas ("War of the promotions") tournament, but did not make it to the finals. He later teamed up with Veneno to compete for the vacant IWL International Tag Team Championship. The duo defeated La Piratas (Pirata Morgan and Pirata Morgan Jr.) but lost to Último Gladiador and Último Vampiro in the finals. Two days later Rivera, Loco Max and Zumbido first defeated Epitafio, Leviatham and Rocky Santana, then Ciclope, Disturbio and Drastik Boy and finally the trio known as La Secta Negra (Carta Brava Jr., Cerebro Negro and Fantasma de la Opera) to win the Copa Criterio Extrema IWL. Back with IWRG Rivera ended up winning the hair of Bombero Infernal as he defeated him in the finals of that year's El Castillo del Terror ("Tower of Terror"). He followed up his IWRG success by defeating Oficial AK-47 in a Luchas de Apuestas match on March 16, 2014. His luck with Apuestas matches ran out on April 6, 2014 when he lost to Black Terry and had all his hair shaved off as a result.

== Championships and accomplishments ==
- Consejo Mundial de Lucha Libre
  - Torneo Gran Alternativa (1998) – with Emilio Charles Jr.
- International Wrestling Revolution Group
  - IWRG Intercontinental Middleweight Championship (1 time)
- Panama Wrestling
  - Panama Welterweight Championship (1 time)

== Luchas de Apuestas record ==
Winner (wager)	Loser (wager)	Location	Event	Date	Notes
Zumbido (mask)	El Renegado (mask)	Mexico City	Live event	November 1995	
Tony Rivera (hair)	Fighter (mask)	Unknown	Live event	Unknown	
Tony Rivera (hair)	Ráfaga Moreno (hair)	Nezahualcóyotl, Mexico City	Live event	Unknown	
Tony Rivera (hair)	Super Punk (mask)	Unknown	Live event	Unknown	
El Cuervo (hair)	Tony Rivera (hair)	Naucalpan, Mexico State	Live event	November 3, 1996	
Tony Rivera (hair)	Judo Suwa (hair)	Tulancingo, Hidalgo	Live event	June 29, 1997	
Tony Rivera (hair)	Reyes Veloz (hair)	Mexico City	Live event	November 30, 1997	
Tony Rivera (hair)	Andy Barrow (hair)	Unknown	Live event	1998	
Tony Rivera (hair)	Valentín Mayo (hair)	Mexico City	Live event	February 1, 1998	
Tony Rivera (hair)	Guerrero de la Muerte (hair)	Mexico City	Live event	August 1998	
Tony Rivera (hair)	Guerrero del Futuro (hair)	Mexico City	Live event	August 11, 1998	
Tony Rivera (hair)	Bestia Negra I (hair)	Mexico City	Live event	October 1, 1998	
Tony Rivera (hair)	Halcón Negro Jr. (hair)	Mexico City	Live event	December 15, 1998	(Note: This was a triangle match that also included Ringo Mendoza)
Tony Rivera (hair)	Negro Navarro (hair)	Puebla, Puebla	Live event	February 1, 1999	
Tony Rivera (hair)	Halcón Negro Jr. (hair)	Mexico City	Live event	December 19, 1999	
Tony Rivera (hair)	Mr. México (hair)	Mexico City	Live event	March 21, 2000	
Tony Rivera (hair)	Súper Cacao (hair)	Mexico City	Live event	May 18, 2000	(Note: The team lost a Relevos Suicidas match to Brazo de Oro and Fugaz and were forced to wrestle each other.)
Tony Rivera (hair)	Chicago Express (hair)	Puebla, Puebla	Live event	June 19, 2000	
Tony Rivera (hair)	El Hijo del Gladiador (hair)	Puebla, Puebla	Live event	February 19, 2001	
Tony Rivera and Ricky Marvin (hair)	El Diablo and Bestia Negra I (hair)	Cuernavaca, Morelos	Live event	August 2001	
Tony Rivera (hair)	Bestial (mask)	Celaya, Guanajuato	Live event	August 15, 2001	
Tony Rivera (hair)	Brazo de Platino (hair)	Cuernavaca, Morelos	Live event	October 18, 2001	
Tony Rivera (hair)	Andy Barrow (hair)	Cuernavaca, Morelos	Live event	March 28, 2002	
Los Strippers (Tony Rivera, Impacto and Baby Star) (hair)	Los Bestias Negras (Bestia Negra I, II and III) (hair)	Cuernavaca, Morelos	Live event	July 18, 2002	
Tony Rivera (hair)	Bestial (hair)	Mexico City	Live event	November 2, 2002	
Tony Rivera (hair)	Mr. México (hair)	Puebla, Puebla	Live event	November 17, 2003	
Tony Rivera (hair)	Bestia Negra I (hair)	Cuernavaca, Morelos	Live event	July 17, 2003	(Note: The team lost a Relevos Suicidas match to Super Brazo and Bestial and were forced to wrestle each other.)
Tony Rivera (hair)	Super Brazo (hair)	Cuernavaca, Morelos	Live event	August 7, 2003}	
Veneno (hair)	Tony Rivera (hair)	Mexico City	Live event	June 20, 2004	
Zumbido (hair)	Tony Rivera (hair)	Cuernavaca, Morelos	Live event	November 4, 2004	
Tony Rivera (hair)	Andy Barrow (hair)	Cuernavaca, Morelos	Live event	November 3, 2005	
Tony Rivera (hair) and El Gallo (mask)	Super Maquina (hair) and Conflictus (mask)	Guadalajara, Jalisco	Live event	November 5, 2006	
Virus (hair)	Tony Rivera (hair)	Mexico City	Live event	August 5, 2007	
Tony Rivera (hair)	Flama Roja (hair)	Nezahualcóyotl, Mexico City	Live event	November 18, 2007	
Ramstein (mask)	Tony Rivera (hair)	Nezahualcóyotl, Mexico City	Live event	December 25, 2007	
Malefico (hair)	Tony Rivera (hair)	Guadalajara, Jalisco	Live event	February 19, 2008	(Note: Last two men in a Steel Cage Match that also included Leono, Leon Blanco, El Texano Jr., Alex Koslov, Infierno and Máscara Mágica.)
Tony Rivera (hair)	Guero Loco (hair)	Guadalajara, Jalisco	Live event	July 27, 2008	
Loco Max (hair)	Tony Rivera (hair)	Mexico City	Live event	October 5, 2008	
Tony Rivera (hair)	Fantasma de la Ópera (hair)	N/A	Live event	August 14, 2011	
Tony Rivera (hair)	Bombero Infernal (hair)	Naucalpan, Mexico State	El Castillo del Terror	November 3, 2013	
Tony Rivera (hair)	Oficial AK-47 (hair)	Naucalpan, Mexico State	Guerra del Golfo	March 16, 2014	
Black Terry (hair)	Tony Rivera (hair)	Naucalpan, Mexico State	IWRG Zona XXI	June 14, 2014	
Rey Mendoza Jr. (hair), Kaving (mask) and Kortiz (mask)	Tony Rivera, Dr. Killer Jr. and Ciclon Black (hair)	Los Reyes la Paz	live event	November 28, 2014	
