= Bombero Infernal =

Mexican professional wrestler

Personal information
- Born: Guillermo Martinez Cid; July 29, 1972 (age 53) Mexico City, Mexico
- Family: Demonio Infernal (son); Matrix Jr. (son); Muerte Infernal (son); Capitan Muerte (son); La Bomberita (daughter)

Professional wrestling career
- Ring name(s): Bombero Infernal; Matrix; AK-47; Kraneo; Capitán Muerte; Temerario Infernal
- Billed height: 1.73 m (5 ft 8 in)
- Billed weight: 87 kg (192 lb)
- Trained by: El Scorpio; Jorge Bernal
- Debut: July 24, 1988

Guillermo Martinez Cid (born July 29, 1972) is a Mexican professional wrestler, known under a variety of ring names, primarily Bombero Infernal. He was the first person to wrestle under the name AK-47 but was later replaced, he also worked as Matrix, Kraneo, Capitán Muerte and Temerario Infernal. He is a freelance wrestler on the Mexican independent circuit and has worked on a regular basis for International Wrestling Revolution Group (IWRG) over the years. His son is currently wrestling as Matrix, Jr.

== Professional wrestling career ==
Guillermo Martinez made his professional wrestling debut on July 24, 1988, three days before his 16th birthday. Between his debut in 1988 and 1996 it has not been verified which ring names he worked under, based partly on the fact that in Mexican professional wrestling has a tradition of keeping the real names of masked wrestlers a closely guarded secret unless they are unmasked. Martinez confirmed his debut date but never confirmed which names he used before becoming "Bombero Infernal" ("The Firefighter") in 1996.

=== Bombero Infernal (unknown-2003) ===
In 1996 Guillermo Martinez began wrestling under the name "Bombero Infernal", complete with a mask and ring gear adorned in flames and diabolical images. He had only worked under that name for just over a year when he became involved in a storyline feud against El Pantera, the rivalry escalated to the point where both wrestlers agreed to put their masks on the line in a Lucha de Apuestas, or "bet match", the most prestigious match type in Lucha Libre. The match took place on December 7, 1997 in International Wrestling Revolution Group's (IWRG) Arena Naucalpan in Naucalpan, State of Mexico with Bombero Infernal losing the match, which forced him to unmask in the middle of the ring, state his birthname and how long he had been a wrestler. Oftentimes losing the mask means the end of a specific ring character, but Martinez stuck with the Bombero Infernal ring characters in the years after his loss. On January 10, 1999 Bombero Infernal won the IWRG Intercontinental Middleweight Championship from Mr. Niebla and held the championship for 146 days straight. The title change was part of a long running storyline between Bombero and Mr. Niebla that saw Mr. Niebla regain the championship on June 6, 1999 but ultimately lose it to Bombero Infernal once again on October 24, 1999. His second reign ended at the hands of Último Vampiro on December 16, 1999 when he defeated Bombero Infernal. In late 2000 Bombero Infernal teamed up with Cripta and El Enterrador to defeat the team of Super Caló, Alan Stone and Moto Cross to win the Distrito Federal Trios Championship. On November 19, 2000 Bombero Infernal regained the IWRG Intercontinental Middleweight Championship from Último Vampiro. Bombero's time as a double champion ended on February 11, 2001 when Los Oficiales (Guardia, Oficial and Virgilante) won the DF Trios Championship. A month later he also lost the Middleweight Championship to Black Dragon. Later that year Bombero Infernal defeated Último Vampiro to win the Middleweight Championship for a fourth time, at the time someone other than the previous Último Vampiro was playing the character. The match between the two ended in a controversial fashion, leading IWRG to take the championship away from Bombero Infernal only one week later. In 2002 Bombero Infernal rekindled his storyline with El Pantera, going so far as to put his hair on the line against Pantera's Middleweight Championship, in a match that saw Bombero victoriously claim his fifth IWRG Intercontinental Middleweight Championship. His fifth reign lasted 95 days in total before it coming to an end when Tony Rivera defeated him. On November 11, 2002 Bombero Infernal, El Hijo del Diablo and El Engendro defeated Dr. Cerebro, Cirujano and Paramedico to win the DF Trios Championship once again, a title they would quickly lose to a new group called Los Megas (Mega, Omega and Ultra Mega)

=== Matrix (2003–2006) ===
In 2003 IWRG decided to give Guillermo Martinez a new ring character, replacing the diabolical rudo character with "Matrix", a high flying, ultra colorful tecnico ("good guy") wrestling character designed to appeal to younger kids. During his time as Matrix he won the IWRG Intercontinental Middleweight Championship for a sixth time when he defeated Cerebro Negro. At the time it was not officially acknowledge that he was a six time champion since the previous five were won as "Bombero Infernal". On January 13, 2005 Matrix lost the championship to Veneno. Martinez kept working as Matrix on an irregular basis until he faced off against Fantastik in a Lucha de Apuestas match, the match was the first time ever the two had met and saw Matrix unmask and reveal his real identity. Following the reveal he abandoned the Matrix character.

=== AK-47, Kraneo and Capitán Muerte (2006-2009) ===
IWRG gave him another character, this time a return to the rudo side as he became "AK-47", part of a new version of Los Oficiales, a longtime IWRG concept of wrestling policemen. His time as AK-47 was very short as he was replaced by a second Oficial AK-47 in May 2007. Martinez was instead repackaged as "Kraneo", a wrestling name used by El Alebrije years before. As Kraneo he teamed up with Cybog Cop and Xibalba to form La Escuadron de la Muerte ("The Squadron of Death") as they feuded with Los Oficiales (AK-47, Oficial 911 and Oficial Fierro). On July 19, 2007 La Escuadron defeated the trio of Mike Segura, Dr. Cerebro and Cerebro Negro to win the IWRG Intercontinental Trios Championship. The trio held the championship for 437 days until Los Oficiales won the belts on September 28, 2008. Not long after the title loss Martinez gave up the Kraneo character and instead became known as "Capitán Muerte" ("Captain Death"), another rudo character. He worked as Capitán Muerte until December 17, 2009 where he was unmasked when he lost the annual Prison Fatal steel cage match to Zathura and had to unmask. During his unmasking, Martinez stated that he had been a professional wrestler for 8 years and not 21 years that was actually the case, possibly to try mask the fact that he was the former Bombero Infernal.

=== Bombero Infernal (2009–present) ===
Following the mask loss Martinez returned to using the Bombero Infernal name after spending six years under other names. In 2010 he teamed up with Maldito, Jr. and Samoth to form a trio known as La Ola Maldita ("The Bad Wave"). The trio had a long running storyline feud with Los Terrible Cerebros (Black Terry, Cerebro Negro and Dr. Cerebro), centering on Los Cerebros Distrito Federal Trios Championship. The feud saw the two teams face off in a "Captain's Fall" match where the captain of the losing team would be shaved bald. Black Terry pinned Bombero Infernal and as a result Bombero was shaved bald after the match. Following the end of the storyline with Los Terrible Cerebros, Ola Maldita went their separate ways. Bombero Infernal would later team up with longtime rival Black Terry, joined by Alan Extreme to form Los Nuevo Temerarios ("The New Terrors"), this led to Bombero Infernal to be billed as "Temerario Infernal" for some of their trios matches. In September, 2012 Bombero Infernal was one of eight participants in IWRG's 2012 Ruleta de la Muerte tournament. In the tournament the loser of a match would advance in the tournament with the final two wrestlers both risking their hair in the finals. Bombero Infernal lost to Eterno in the first round and Veneno in the second round. In the finals he faced off against AK-47, with the match ending in a draw. As a result of the draw both wrestlers had their hair shaved off.

== Championships and accomplishments ==
- International Wrestling Revolution Group
  - IWRG Intercontinental Middleweight Championship (7 times)
  - IWRG Intercontinental Tag Team Championship (1 time) – with Dr. Cerebro
  - IWRG Intercontinental Trios Championship (1 time) – with Xibalva and Cyborg Cop
  - Distrito Federal Trios Championship (2 times) – with Cripta and El Enterrador, El Engendro and El Hijo del Diablo

== Luchas de Apuestas record ==
Winner (wager)	Loser (wager)	Location	Event	Date	Notes
Bombero Infernal (mask)	Neblina (mask)	Naucalpan, State of Mexico	Live event	August 10, 1997	
Bombero Infernal (mask)	Enemigo Público (mask)	Naucalpan, State of Mexico	Live event	November 16, 1997	
El Pantera (mask)	Bombero Infernal (mask)	Naucalpan, State of Mexico	Live event	December 7, 1997	
Bombero Infernal (hair)	Star Boy (hair)	Naucalpan, State of Mexico	Live event	June 21, 1998	
Mike Segura (hair)	Bombero Infernal (hair)	Naucalpan, State of Mexico	Live event	August 23, 1998	(Note: This was a triangle match that also included Dr. Cerebro.)
Bombero Infernal (hair)	Fire Man (mask)	Naucalpan, State of Mexico	Live event	April 18, 1999	(Note: Lost a Relevos Suicidas match to El Salsero and El Matador and were forced to wrestle each other.)
Bombero Infernal (hair)	Kato Kung Lee (hair)	Naucalpan, State of Mexico	Live event	December 5, 1999	
Ciclón Ramírez (hair)	Bombero Infernal (hair)	Naucalpan, State of Mexico	Live event	June 15, 2000	
Fantasy (hair)	Bombero Infernal (hair)	Naucalpan, State of Mexico	Live event	September 16, 2001	(Note: Lost a Relevos Suicidas match to Dr. Cerebro and Mike Segura and were forced to wrestle each other.)
Último Vampiro (V) (mask)	Bombero Infernal (hair)	Naucalpan, State of Mexico	Live event	January 1, 2003	
Fantastik (hair)	Matrix (hair)	Nezahualcoyotl, Mexico State	Live event	May 5, 2006	
Zathura (hair)	Capitán Muerte (hair)	Naucalpan, State of Mexico	Live event	December 17, 2009	(Note: Last two wrestlers in a multi-man elimination steel cage match.)
Bombero Infernal (hair)	Yack (hair)	Naucalpan, State of Mexico	Live event	May 23, 2010	
Black Terry (hair)	Bombero Infernal (hair)	Naucalpan, State of Mexico	Live event	June 24, 2010	(Note: Part of a "Captain's hair" match, Black Terry, Cerebro Negro and Dr. Cerebro vs. Bombero Infernal, Maldito, Jr. and Samoth)
Draw	Bombero Infernal (hair); Oficial AK-47 (hair)	Naucalpan, State of Mexico	Live event	September 6, 2012	(Note: Face off in the finals of the 2012 Ruleta de la Muerte show.)
Eterno (hair)	Bombero Infernal (hair)	Naucalpan, State of Mexico	IWRG Show	September 3, 2017	
