= Mike Segura =

Mexican professional wrestler

Personal information
- Born: Miguel Angel Nava; July 29, 1969 (age 57) Mexico State

Professional wrestling career
- Ring name(s): Aeroman; Komachi (II); Mike Segura; Orito; Oro Jr. Suicida; Super Nova
- Billed height: 1.67 m (5 ft 5 1/2 in)
- Billed weight: 76 kg (168 lb)
- Trained by: Pantera I

Miguel Angel Nava (born July 29, 1969) is a Mexican professional wrestler best known under the ring name, Mike Segura. American fans knows Nava under the name Super Nova from his appearances in the World Wrestling Federation (WWF). Nava originally worked in Consejo Mundial de Lucha Libre's (CMLL) Minis division and held the CMLL World Mini-Estrella Championship but later moved into the regular division. Nava currently works for International Wrestling Revolution Group (IWRG) as Mike Segura.

== Professional wrestling career ==
=== Consejo Mundial de Lucha Libre ===
Miguel Angel Nava made his professional wrestling debut in 1991; in 1992 then-CMLL booker Antonio Peña left Consejo Mundial de Lucha Libre (CMLL) to form his own promotion, Asistencia Asesoría y Administración (AAA); Peña had been the mastermind behind the CMLL Minis division and most of the Minis in CMLL decided to leave with Peña. Serrano and a number of other wrestlers were brought in to replenish the division. Working in the Mini division does not necessarily mean that Nava is a dwarf as several short wrestlers work in the "Mini" division. Miguel Nava was one of the wrestlers brought into CMLL to replenish the division, he was given the ring persona of Orito, a mini version of Oro who worked in CMLL at the time. On September 6, 1992 Orito won a tournament to crown a new CMLL World Mini-Estrella Champion after the AAA exodus, defeating El Felinito in the final. On March 14, 1993, lost the CMLL Minis title to Último Dragóncito, ending his reign at 189 days. In the mid to late-1990s CMLL did not focus much on their Minis division, their rarely made it onto their television shows which meant that Orito only used sparingly for a number of years. During the slow period Orito began a long running storyline, or feud, with El Felinito, a feud that the two of them would continue after jumping to AAA in 1997.

=== Asistencia Asesoría y Administración ===
In AAA Nava was given a new ring persona, "Super Nova", was moved into the "regular" divisions and made a part of the wrestling group Los Cadetes Del Espacio (Spanish for "The Space Cadets"). El Felinito was also moved into the "regular" division, repackaged as "Mach-1" and made a part of a group called Los Rudos De La Galaxia (The Villains of the Galaxy). Miguel Nava, as Super Nova, made several appearances for the World Wrestling Federation (WWF) as part of the AAA/WWF talent trading agreement. His first appearance was on the March 24, 1997 WWF Monday Night Raw where he teamed up with fellow "Cadets" Discovery and Venum to defeat the "Rudos De La Galaxia" team of Abismo Negro, El Mosco and Histeria. The following day, at a WWF Shotgun Saturday Night taping Super Nova, Discovery, Venum and Ludxor defeated the team of Abismo Negro, El Mosco, Histeria and Maniaco. Super Nova's last WWF match was on March 31, 1997 when he lost a singles match to El Mosco on Monday Night Raw. while Miguel Nava did not make further WWF appearances a mini version of Super Nova, called Mino Nova or just Nova wrestled for the WWF from 1997 until 1999.

=== International Wrestling Revolution Group ===
In the fall of 1997 Miguel Nava, along with a large group of other wrestlers, left AAA and ended up working for rival promotion Promo Azteca. Nava used the ring character "Oro, Jr.", the same mask and tights as Orito but this time he competed in the regular division. During his debut for Promo Azteca he wore the "Super Nova" mask, but removed it to reveal the Oro, Jr. mask. After Promo Azteca folded Nava began working for a promotion out of Arena Neza, when that promotion became International Wrestling Revolution Group (IWRG) Nava was one of the regulars. In 1998 Nava lost the "Oro, Jr." mask after losing a Luchas de Apuestas match to Dr. Cerebro. After being unmasked he started work as "Mike Segura" and quickly earned the nickname "Suicida" due to his high risk dives out of the ring. On February 15, 2007 Segura teamed up with Dr. Cerebro and Cerebro Negro to win the IWRG Intercontinental Trios Championship from El Hijo del Diablo, Fantasma de la Opera and Veneno. The trio would defend the championship for 154 days before losing to the Escuadron de la Muerte team of Capitan Muerte, Cyborg Cop and Xibalba Shortly after the title loss Mike Segura disappeared from the IWRG, soon after an enmascarado called "Aeroman" made his debut with a style so close to Segura's that it was impossible to hide his true identity causing fans to chant "Suicida" during his matches. He briefly left IWRG to work for Desastre Total Ultraviolento (DTU) as Mike Segura, in DTU he won the DTU Extreme Championship from Aero Boy on February 2, 2008, holding it for 72 days before losing it to Paranoiko. In May 2009 an unmasked Mike Segura returned to IWRG with no mention of the Aeroman gimmick. On July 5, 2009 Mike Segura lost a Prison Fatal match to Avisman I and as a result had his hair shaved.

== Personal life ==
Nava's brother is a retired professional wrestler, he used to work as "Pantera I", teaming with Pantera II.

== Championships and accomplishments ==
- Consejo Mundial de Lucha Libre
  - CMLL World Mini-Estrella Championship (1 time)
- Comision de Box y Lucha D.F.
  - Mexico State Welterweight Championship (1 time)
- Desastre Total Ultraviolento
  - DTU Extreme Championship (1 time)
- International Wrestling League
  - IWL International Junior Heavyweight Championship (1 time)
- International Wrestling Revolution Group
  - IWRG Intercontinental Trios Championship (1 time) – with Dr. Cerebro and Cerebro Negro
  - Copa Higher Power (1998) – with Mr. Niebla, El Pantera, Shocker, El Solar and Star Boy

== Luchas de Apuestas record ==
Winner (wager)	Loser (wager)	Location	Event	Date	Notes
Orito (mask)	Kundrita (hair)	Naucalpan, Mexico State	Live event	N/A	
Orito (mask)	Pequeño Cavernicolita (hair)	Naucalpan, Mexico State	Live event	N/A	
Orito (mask)	Pequeño Steel (mask)	Naucalpan, Mexico State	Live event	N/A	
Oro Jr. (mask)	Jurassico (hair)	Cuernavaca, Morelos	Live event	N/A	
Dr. Cerebro (mask)	Oro Jr. (mask)	Naucalpan, Mexico State	Live event	N/A	
Mike Segura (hair)	Bombero Infernal (hair)	Naucalpan, Mexico State	Live event	N/A	(Note: This was a triangle match that also included Dr. Cerebro.)
Mike Segura (hair)	Star Boy (hair)	Naucalpan, Mexico State	Live event	N/A	
Fuerza Guerrera (mask)	Mike Segura (hair)	Naucalpan, Mexico State	Live event	N/A	(Note: Relevos Suicidas: The team lost to Torero and El Matador and were forced to wrestle each other.)
Máscara Sagrada (mask)	Mike Segura (hair)	Celaya, Guanajuato	Live event	N/A	
Mike Segura and Último Vampiro (hair)	Tokyo Gurentai (hair) (Masada and Nosawa)	Naucalpan, Mexico State	Live event	May 31, 2001	
Fantasy (hair)	Mike Segura (hair)	Naucalpan, Mexico State	Live event	December 28, 2003	
Mike Segura (hair)	Torbellino (hair)	Capulhuac	Live event	November 22, 2004	(Note: Relevos Suicidas: The team lost to Volador Jr. and Aguila Oriental and were forced to wrestle each other.)
Mike Segura (hair)	Avisman I (hair)	Naucalpan, Mexico State	Live event	September 15, 2005	(Note: Relevos Suicidas: The team lost to Dr. Cerebro and Cerebro Negro and were forced to wrestle each other.)
Mike Segura (hair)	Pirata Morgan, Jr. (hair)	Naucalpan, Mexico State	Live event	December 25, 2005	
Mike Segura (hair)	Dr. Cerebro (hair)	Naucalpan, Mexico State	Live event	March 16, 2006	
Cerebro Negro (hair)	Mike Segura (hair)	Naucalpan, Mexico State	Live event	March 30, 2006	
Cerebro Negro (hair)	Mike Segura (hair)	Naucalpan, Mexico State	Live event	February 22, 2007	
Avisman I (hair)	Mike Segura (hair)	Naucalpan, Mexico State	Prison Fatal	July 5, 2009	(Note: Prison Fatal steel cage match that also included Tetsuya Bushi and Freelance.)
Neza Kid (hair)	Mike Segura (hair)	Ciudad Nezahualcóyotl, Mexico State	Live event	May 13, 2011	
Silencio (hair)	Mike Segura (hair)	Monterrey, Nuevo León	Live event	October 2, 2011	
Carta Brava Jr. (mask)	Mike Segura (hair)	Tlalnepantla, Mexico State, Mexico	Promociones HUMO 1. Aniversario	November 30, 2014	
Arez (hair)	Mike Segura (hair)	Naucalpan, Mexico State	Lucha Memes show	December 25, 2016	(Note: Last man in a three team, three-way steel cage match that also included Aramis, Iron Kid, Alas de Acero, Sádico, Freelance, Belial and Impulso.)
Demus (hair)	Mike Segura	Xalapa	Live event	May 3, 2019	(Note: Steel cage match)
