= Cerebro Negro =

Mexican professional wrestler

Personal information
- Born: Ricardo Antonio Morales Gonzalez; September 30, 1973 (age 52) Mexico City, Mexico

Professional wrestling career
- Ring name(s): Cerebro Negro; Guerra C-3
- Billed height: 1.70 m (5 ft 7 in)
- Billed weight: 82 kg (181 lb)
- Trained by: Fantasma de la Opera; El Scorpio; Super Muñeco
- Debut: May 30, 1991

Ricardo Antonio Morales Gonzalez (born September 30, 1973), better known under the ring name Cerebro Negro ("Black Brain"), is a Mexican professional wrestler, currently working for the Mexican promotion International Wrestling Revolution Group (IWRG) portraying a rudo ("Bad guy") wrestling character as well as a number of independent promotions.

== Professional wrestling career ==
Ricardo Antonio Morales Gonzalez made his professional wrestling debut in 1991, but never revealed what ring name he used between 1991 and 1998. In Mexico, the real life identities of masked wrestlers are generally kept private including not revealing their real names. previous identities are at times not revealed, which is the case with Ricardo Morales. He has stated that he started wrestling in 1991 but never revealed what ring name he used.

=== Guerra C-3 (1998–2002) ===
Morales adopted the character Guerra C-3 ("War C-3") in early 1998 while working for Promo Azteca. The character was a "wrestling version" of the android C-3PO from the Star Wars movies, who teamed up with "Galaxia R2" ("Galaxy R2"), inspired by R2-D2. In 1999 the tag team began working regularly for International Wrestling Revolution Group (IWRG) based in Naucalpan, Mexico State. The team generally wrestled on the lower half of the show, facing such teams as Los Hijos del Espanto (I and II), Los Megas (Mega and Super Mega) and Los Avismans (I and II), taking the masks of the latter tag team in the fall of 2002. Guerra C3 and Galaxia R2 turned heel but they did not achieve any success and in 2003 Galaxia R2 left IWRG or took another gimmick.

=== Cerebro Negro (2002–present) ===
In late 2002 Morales abandoned the Guerra C-3 character and instead began working as Cerebro Negro ("Black Brain"), a rudo character (a wrestler who portrays the "bad guy", also called a "heel"). Morales was actually not the first person to work as Cerebro Negro, but the first wrestler to use the name only did so for a short period of time and IWRG decided to pass the character on to Morales. The original Cerebro Negro only worked under that name for such a brief period of time that it was not obvious that the man beneath the mask had changed. In one of his early matches he defeated Dr. Cerebro, a wrestler with a similar character who would later become both a tag team partner and a rival. On October 10, 2002 Cerebro Negro defeated Dr. cerebro to win his first of an eventual five IWRG Intercontinental Welterweight Championships, a title he would only hold for 17 days before losing it to Fantasy. He regained the title from Fantasy on August 24, 2008 and would go on to hold it for 105 days before losing it to Avisman. He would later regain the title from Avisman. In 2004 Cerebro Negro began teaming with Dr. Cerebro Negro on a regular basis, to form Los Terrible Cerebros, who would win the IWRG Intercontinental Tag Team Championship on two separate occasions. In 2005 Los Terrible Cerebros would team up with Veneno to win the Distrito Federal Trios Championship and in 2007 the two, along with Mike Segura would win the IWRG Intercontinental Trios Championship. On the Mexican Independent Circuit Cerebro Negra formed La Secta Nega ("The Black Sect") teaming up with Carta Brava Jr. and Fantasma de la Opera. On November 3, 2005 Cerebro Negro competed in the 2005 El Castillo del Terror show's main event, a steel cage match where the last man in the ring would be forced to unmask . Cerebro Negro was forced to remove his mask when Masada was the last man to climb out of the ring. Following the loss he had to show his face, announced his real name, age and in-ring experience as dictated by the Lucha libre traditions. Two weeks after his mask loss Cerebro Negro outlasted 29 other competitors to win the IWRG Rey del Ring tournament. A year later he would repeat the feat and become the only person so far to win 2 Rey del Ring tournaments. Los Terrible Cerebros would also win the hair of Los Gemelo Fantastico ("The Fantastic Twins") in a tag team Lucha de Apuesta match that took place on October 31, 2008. Later on Los Terrible Cerebros would be expanded with longtime wrestler Black Terry, a trio that would hold the Distrito Federal Trios Championship for 488 days straight, defending the championship on multiple occasions. During their run as the trios champions Dr. Cerebro and Cerebro Negro were forced to face off against each other in aLucha de Apuesta after both competitors lost a Steel Cage match, the match saw Dr. Cerebro defeat his partner, leaving Cerebro Negro bald. In April, 2010 the Mexico City wrestling Commission stripped Los Terrible Cerebros of the championship when Cerebro Negro temporarily stopped working for IWRG. They held a tournament to crown new champions which included the team of Cerebro Negro, Kaos and Veneno which was eliminated in the first round by Los Gringos VIP (Avisman, El Hijo del Diablo and Gringo Loco).

In late 2010 Cerebro Negro worked on a show for AAA, one of Mexico's two major wrestling promotions, through AAA's working relationship with IWRG. He, Dr. Cerebro and Chico Che lost to the team of Areo Star, Gato Eveready and Relámpago. Later on he, Dr. Cerebro and Eterno would compete in a tournament for the newly created AAA World Trios Championship, but lost in the first round to Los Bizarros (Charly Manson, Cibernético and Billy el Malo). On June 30, 2012 Cerebro Negro won the International Wrestling League's IWL International Junior Heavyweight Championship as he defeated Mike Segura and Aeroboy on IWL's "Armageddon" show in Tlalnepantla de Baz, State of Mexico. On August 17, 2012 he competed in Desastre Total Ultraviolento's (DTU) first ever Rey del Raquetazo (King of the Chop") tournament. Instead of a wrestling tournament the Rey del Raquetazo saw two competitors take turns Chopping each other in the chest, gaging the fans reaction to the impact. In the first round Cerebro Negro defeated Principe Halcon, in the second he defeated team mate Fantasma de la Opera and in the finals he overcame Comando Negro to become El Rey de Raquetazo In late 2012 Cerebro Negro was one of eight competitors wrestling for the vacant WWS World Welterweight Championship promoted by IWRG. In the first round he defeated Dinamic Black, in the second he defeated Eita and in the finals he defeated former partner, turned rival Dr. Cerebro to win the vacant championship. The rivalry between the two Cerebros led to a Lucha de Apuesta ("Bet match") between the two that ended with Dr. Cerebro pinning Cerebro Negro and thus Negro had all his hair shaved off as per the Apuesta stipulation. On February 14, 2013 Carta Brava, Jr. won the WWS World Welterweight Championship from Cerebro Negro. On April 20, 2016 Cerebro Negro defeated Mike Segura to win the vacant IWRG Intercontinental Welterweight Championship for the sixth time.

== Championships and accomplishments ==
- Alianza Universal De Lucha Libre
  - AULL Trios Championship (1 time, current) - with Carta Brava, Jr. and Fantasma de la Opera
- Desastre Total Ultraviolento
  - Rey del Raquetazo tournament (2012)
- International Wrestling Revolution Group
  - IWRG Intercontinental Middleweight Championship (3 times)
  - IWRG Intercontinental Tag Team Championship (2 time) – with Dr. Cerebro
  - IWRG Intercontinental Trios Championship (2 times) – with Veneno and Scorpio Jr., Dr. Cerebro and Mike Segura
  - IWRG Intercontinental Welterweight Championship (6 times)
  - Distrito Federal Trios Championship (3 times) – with Dr. Cerebro and Veneno (1), Dr. Cerebro and Black Terry (2)
  - WWS World Welterweight Championship (1 time)
  - IWRG Rey del Ring (2005, 2006)
- International Wrestling League
  - IWL International Junior Heavyweight Championship (1 time)
  - WWA Trios Championship (1 time, current) - with Carta Brava, Jr. and Fantasma de la Ópera

== Luchas de Apuestas record ==
Winner (wager)	Loser (wager)	Location	Event	Date	Notes
Cerebro Negro (mask)	Avisman I (hair)	Naucalpan, State of Mexico	Live event	December 21, 2003	
Cerebro Negro (mask)	Zonik 2000 (hair)	Naucalpan, State of Mexico	Live event	May 16, 2004	
Cerebro Negro (mask)	Steel Man (hair)	Naucalpan, State of Mexico	Live event	November 28, 2004	
Masada (hair)	Cerebro Negro (mask)	Naucalpan, State of Mexico	El Castillo del Terror	November 3, 2005	(Note: Last two wrestlers in a multi-man Steel cage match that also included Bestia Salvaje, Blue Demon, Jr., Dr. Wagner, Jr., El Fantasma, Jr., Lizmark, Jr., Shigeo Okumura, Universo 2000 and Veneno)
Cerebro Negro (hair)	Mike Segura (hair)	Naucalpan, State of Mexico	Live event	March 30, 2006	
Cerebro Negro (hair)	Masada (hair)	Naucalpan, State of Mexico	Live event	June 11, 2006	
Cerebro Negro (hair)	Freelance (hair)	Naucalpan, State of Mexico	Live event	September 17, 2006	(Note: Last two men in a multi-man Steel Cage match.)
Cerebro Negro (hair)	Mike Segura (hair)	Naucalpan, State of Mexico	Live event	February 22, 2007	
Cerebro Negro (hair)	Black Terry (hair)	Naucalpan, State of Mexico	Live event	March 11, 2007	
Cerebro Negro (hair)	Rey Lobo (mask)	Mexico City	Live event	March 17, 2007	
Cerebro Negro (hair)	Yamato (hair)	Naucalpan, State of Mexico	Live event	June 21, 2007	(Note: Lost a Relevos Suicida match to El Felino and Pantera, Dr. Cerebro and Kai and had to wrestle each other.)
Black Terry (hair)	Cerebro Negro (hair)	Naucalpan, State of Mexico	Live event	November 22, 2007	
Police Man (hair)	Cerebro Negro (hair)	Puebla, Puebla	Live event	May 12, 2008	
Cerebro Negro and Dr. Cerebro (hair)	Los Gemelo Fantasticos (hair) (I and II)	Naucalpan, State of Mexico	Live event	October 31, 2008	
Dr. Cerebro (hair)	Cerebro Negro (hair)	Naucalpan, State of Mexico	Live event	January 1, 2009	(Note: Both lost a Steel Cage match to be forced into this match.)
Gemelo Fantastico I (hair)	Cerebro Negro (hair)	Naucalpan, State of Mexico	Live event	March 22, 2009	(Note: Last two men in a multi-man Steel Cage match. that also included Gemelo Fantastico II, Trauma I, Trauma II, Universo 2000, Máscara Año 2000, Jr., Scorpio, Jr., Dr. Cerebro, Oficial 911, Oficial AK-47, Hijo de Pierroth, Pierroth II and Zatura)
Fantasma De La Opera (mask)	Cerebro Negro (hair)	N/A	Live event	March 29, 2010	
Aeroboy (mask)	Cerebro Negro (hair)	Cuautitlán Izcalli, State of Mexico	Live event	October 31, 2010	
Zumbi (mask)	Cerebro Negro (hair)	Huamantla, Tlaxcala	Live event	August 12, 2011	(Note: Last two wrestlers in a Steel cage match that also included Aero Star, Angel O Demonio, Argos, Dr. X-treme, Drago, Kung Fu, Jr., Ninja de Fuego, Tony Rivera and Zumbido)
Uncertain (hair)	Cerebro Negro (hair)	Querétaro, Querétaro	Live event	September 17, 2011	(Note: Lost a Steel cage match that also included Dr. Cerebro, Drabek II, Fuego Latino, Lince Infernal, Perro del Ring and Principe. It is not clear who was given credit for the victory)
Dr. Cerebro (hair)	Cerebro Negro (hair)	Naucalpan, State of Mexico	Live event	December 16, 2012	
El Hijo del Diablo (hair)	Cerebro Negro (hair)	Naucalpan, State of Mexico	IWRG event	March 28, 2016	
Cerebro Negro and Dr. Cerebro (hair)	Los Diabólicos (hair) (El Gallego and Romano García)	Nezahualcoyotl, State of Mexico	Liga de la Justicia IV Aniversario	December 25, 2019	
