= Último Vampiro =

Wrestling character

Último Vampiro (Spanish for "Last Vampire") is a wrestling gimmick or character played by at least five people over the years. The character has always started out as an enmascarado, or masked wrestler and only on one occasion has the person playing the Último Vampiro lost his mask. The character is a portrayed as a Vampire and included a mask with stylized bat ears and generally using a black and gray color scheme on the mask and full body suit. The character has primarily been used in International Wrestling Revolution Group (IWRG) and on some locally promoted events. The only exception was the third Último Vampiro who used it while working for Consejo Mundial de Lucha Libre (CMLL) one of Mexico's largest promotions.

== Último Vampiro Version 1 ==
The original Último Vampiro was designed in the mid-1990s by the promoters who would later found International Wrestling Revolution Group (IWRG) as one of their many "concept gimmicks" where the promotion comes up with the character and mask and gives it to a wrestler. The promotion hired Negro Navarro, veteran wrestler who had been highly successful in the early to mid-1980s as part of the Los Misioneros de la Muerte ("Missionaries of Death") trio along with El Texano and El Signo. In 1995 Navarro worked primarily on the independent circuit, especially after the Universal Wrestling Association closed that year. He was given the character to work on the early IWRG shows, but only appeared as Ultimo Vampiro for a short period of time. The only major match Navarro worked as Último Vampiro was a Relevos Suicidas tag team, a match where the losing team would have to wrestle each other in a Luchas de Apuestas, or bet match for their mask or hair. Último Vampiro and El Mexicano defeated the team of El Canek and Scorpio, Jr. keeping their mask and hair safe as El Canek defeated Scorpio, Jr. in the match and had him shaved bald afterwards.

== Último Vampiro Version 2 ==
Following Negro Navarro's stint under the mask the character was briefly given to Bogar Alejandro Ramirez Orosco but was abandoned as he was given the masked character Guardia in AAA instead.

== Último Vampiro Version 3 ==
The third incarnation of Último Vampiro was performed by Manuel Segura and due to the previous two version only working for a short period of time under that name and not achieving a great deal the third incarnation is often mistakenly identified as "Último Vampiro I". Segura had previously worked under the masked identities of Halcón de Plata ("Silver Falcon") and Halcón 2000 for various promoters in and around Mexico City. IWRG reintroduced the Último Vampiro character in 1997, initially working low to mid-card matches on early IWRG shows. On December 12, 1999, Último Vampiro defeated Shiima Nobunaga to win the IWRG Intercontinental Welterweight Championship making him the first Último Vampiro to win a title. Only four days later he added another Championship to his collection as he defeated Bombero Infernal to win the IWRG Intercontinental Middleweight Championship on December 16, 1999 . The run with the Middleweight ended less than a month after it began when Black Dragon won the championship on January 9, 2000. He ended up holding the IWRG Intercontinental Welterweight Championship for just under five months, losing the championship to Dr. Cerebro on May 11, 2000.

In 2000 Segura had a misunderstanding with IWRG and the Ultimo Vampiro gimmick was given to the wrestler previously known as "Super Mega". After an agreement with IWRG management Segura obtained the Super Mega gimmick but fans soon acknowledged the gimmick swap due to different styles sported by the two luchadores. The new Super Mega had a more high flying style while the new Ultimo Vampiro was essentially a solid mat wrestler. Juan Segura was thus unmasked in November 2000 by the very wrestler that replaced him as Ultimo Vampiro. Segura joined up with Mega and Ultra Mega to form the Los Megas Trio. The Último Vampiro character was given to a fourth and then a fifth person later on, but when Segura began working for Consejo Mundial de Lucha Libre (CMLL) he assumed the ring character once more. In CMLL he worked mainly low and mid-card matches but never won any championships while working under the ring character.

== Último Vampiro Version 4 ==
Once the third incarnation of Último Vampiro became Super Mega II the Último Vampiro character was given to the very first Super Mega. Ultimo Vampiro IV was perhaps the most successful of the quintet as he won in succession the masks of Super Mega II, Oficial, Guardia and Enterrador, all top fighters in IWRG. He had also a stint in WFS Arena Aztahuacan, at the time in partnership with Naucalpan, unmasking mainstay rudo Super X. After 2001 he left IWRG and started a lawsuit to gain the rights on the Ultimo Vampiro name ultimately winning it the following year. Ultimo Vampiro IV fought subsequently on the independent circuit, especially in Coacalco, with appearances in NWA Mexico, Perros del Mal and AULL promotions. He has returned more regularly on rings between 2016 and 2017, resuming also his rivalry with the former third Ultimo Vampiro now Super Mega. Ultimo Vampiro IV, real name Horacio Hiquito Moreno, died on March 18, 2025, at the age of 48.

== Último Vampiro Version 5 ==
The fifth Último Vampiro took over around the end of 2001 and in number of title reigns became the most successful Último Vampiro performer. He held the IWRG Intercontinental Middleweight Championship a total of three times between 2002 and 2004 when he lost the championship. On January 24, 2002, Último Vampiro V lost the IWRG Intercontinental Middleweight Championship to Pantera in a match where Pantera and the third participant Pentagon both risked their masks on the outcome of the match while Último Vampiro V risked his championship. Último Vampiro V won the first ever IWRG Rey del Ring tournament on June 6, 2002, when he eliminated Bombero Infernal as the last participant in the 30-man elimination match. He would later defeat Tony Rivera to regain the Middleweight title but would lose it to Dr. Cerebro at some point in 2002. Último Vampiro V became the only Último Vampiro to lose a Luchas de Apuestas match and thus be forced to unmask, as he was defeated by Hijo de Anibal and had to unmask. After the unmasking it was impossible to give the Último Vampiro character to someone else and pretend it was the same person in IWRG. Meanwhile, Ultimo Vampiro IV had legally won the rights to bear the Ultimo Vampiro gimmick, and this was probably the reason because the fifth version of Último Vampiro was unmasked. Ultimo Vampiro V only worked sporadically for IWRG after losing his mask, winning the Middleweight title for a fourth and final time in 2004, but would later vacate the title as he stopped working for IWRG.

== Championships and accomplishments ==
Only championships won under the "Último Vampiro" character are listed.

- Alianza Universal de Lucha Libre

- AULL Trios Championship (1 time) – with Robin Maravilla and Yakuza

- International Wrestling League

- IWL International Tag Team Championship (1 time) - with Último Gladiador

- International Wrestling Revolution Group

- IWRG Intercontinental Middleweight Championship (5 times) – Último Vampiro (III)(1 time), Último Vampiro (IV)(4 times)
- IWRG Intercontinental Welterweight Championship (1 time) – Último Vampiro (III)

== Lucha de Apuesta record ==
Only Luchas de Apuestas under the "" character are listed.

Wager	Winner	Loser	Location	Date	Notes
Mask	Último Vampiro (IV)	Oficial	Naucalpan, Mexico State	December 17, 2000	
Hair	Mike Segura and Último Vampiro (IV)	NOZAWA and MAZADA	Naucalpan, Mexico State	May 31, 2001	
Mask	Último Vampiro (IV)	Guardia	Naucalpan, Mexico State	November 1, 2001	(Note: Last two men in a 10-man steel cage match.)
Mask	Último Vampiro (IV)	El Enterrador	Naucalpan, Mexico State	December 20, 2001	
Championship	Pantera	Último Vampiro (IV)	January 24, 2002	Naucalpan, Mexico State	(Note: Pantera put his mask on the line for the match. The match also included Pentagon who also risked his mask if he was pinned.)
Hair	Último Vampiro (IV)	Bombero Infernal	Naucalpan, Mexico State	January 1, 2003	
Mask	Hijo de Aníbal	Último Vampiro (V)	Naucalpan, Mexico State	March 13, 2003	
Hair	Último Vampiro (IV)	Anticristo	Coacalco, Mexico State	June 15, 2003	
