= Oficial AK-47 =

Mexican luchador (born 1984)

Personal information
- Born: Mario Pardo Villagómez; February 14, 1984 (age 42) Casas Grandes, Chihuahua

Professional wrestling career
- Ring name(s): AK-47 / Oficial AK-47; Black Stone; Sureño de la Muerte
- Billed height: 1.76 m (5 ft 9 1/2 in)
- Billed weight: 86 kg (190 lb)
- Debut: 2003

Mario Pardo Villagómez (born February 14, 1984) is a Mexican professional wrestler, best known under the ring name Oficial AK-47. As Oficial AK-47 he is part of a group called Los Oficiales that has worked for International Wrestling Revolution Group (IWRG) since 2007. The team held the record for the longest reigning Distrito Federal Trios Champions and are the most successful holders of the IWRG Intercontinental Trios Championship, holding it longer than any other trios team and having defended it more times than any previous champions have. AK-47 is also a former one-time IWRG Intercontinental Middleweight Champion. He previously worked as the enmascarado characters Sureño de la Muerte and Black Stone. He is named after the AK-47 assault rifle. Wrestling most his career under a mask, Pardo's true identity was revealed on December 22, 2011, when he lost his mask in a match against Trauma I.

== Professional wrestling career ==
Pardo made his debut in 2003, working as an enmascarado called "Sureño de la Muerte" (Spanish for "Southern Death"). Later on he was recast as "Black Stone", working on the undercard of various International Wrestling Revolution Group (IWRG) shows.

=== Los Oficiales ===
In early 2007 IWRG officials decided to form a new version of the group Los Oficiales ("The Officials"), a masked trios group that all had a "Police officer" ring character. The three masked men, Oficial 911, Oficial AK-47, and Oficial Fierro were unveiled at a Lucha Libre festival in May 2007. It was later revealed that Black Stone had not left IWRG as suspected, but in fact was the wrestler working as Oficial Ak-47. On July 7, 2007, they defeated the Japanese trio of Kai, Sasaki and Yamato to win the Distrito Federal Trios Championship, a title that had been relatively inactive up for at least a year before Los Oficiales won the belts.

Los Oficiales went on to defend the Trios title on a regular basis, giving credibility to both the Trios championship and to Los Oficiales as a group. On September 28, 2008, Los Oficiales became double champions as they defeated Cyborg, Kraneo, Xibalva (who had all been members of previous incarnations of Los Oficiales) to win the IWRG Intercontinental Trios Championship. Their success in 2008 led to several Mexican publications naming Los Oficiales as the best Trio, or runner-up for best Trios team for 2008. Los Oficiales run as double Trio champions ended on December 7, 2008, when Los Terrible Cerebros (Black Terry, Dr. Cerebro and Cerebro Negro). Los Oficiales continued to defend the IWRG Trios title through 2009 and into 2010, and by April 21, 2010, had made at least nine successful defenses of the title, more than any previous title holder. Their success has also seen them named the best version of Los Oficiales. Oficial AK-47 has also achieved individual success, including winning a number of Lucha de Apuesta or bet matches. On December 21, 2008, AK-47 and Arlequin were the last two wrestlers in a 10-man Steel Cage match and thus were forced to wrestled for their mask (AK-47) or hair (Arlequin). In the end AK-47 pinned Arlequin and watched as his opponent was shaved bald after the match per Lucha Libre traditions. AK-47 also won IWRG's annual Castillo del Terror ("Castle of Terror") match in 2009, unmasking Yack. On March 3, 2011, Los Oficiales lost the IWRG Intercontinental Trios Championship to Joe Líder, Silver King and Último Gladiador, ending their reign at 886 days. On December 22, Oficial AK-47 teamed with Trauma I to face Oficial 911 and Trauma II in a Relevos Suicidas match and after losing the match, AK-47 and Trauma I were forced to face each other in a Mask vs. Mask match. Originally AK-47 won the match with a Martinete, but the referee reversed the decision and disqualified him, after finding out about the illegal move, forcing AK-47 to unmask himself. Upon unmasking, AK-47 revealed that his real name was Mario Pardo Villagómez and that he was a 27-year-old, seven-year veteran originally from the city of Casas Grandes, Chihuahua. On March 15, 2012, AK-47 also lost his hair in another Lucha de Apuestas, after interfering in a steel cage match between Oficial 911 and Oficial Factor, a member of rival group Los Oficiales Elite, ending up being left in the cage, when the other Oficiales escaped. On May 6, Oficial AK-47 defeated Veneno in the finals of a tournament to become the first IWRG Intercontinental Middleweight Champion in four years. He lost the title to El Ángel on October 7, 2012. On February 7, 2013, Los Oficiales lost the Distrito Federal Trios Championship to El Hijo de Pirata Morgan, Pirata Morgan and Pirata Morgan, Jr. On June 15, 2014, AK-47 and 911 defeated Apolo Estrada, Jr. and El Hijo del Diablo to win the IWRG Intercontinental Tag Team Championship.

== Championships and accomplishments ==
- Alianza Universal de Lucha Libre
  - AULL Tag Team Championship (1 time, current) – with Oficial 911
- International Wrestling Revolution Group
  - IWRG Intercontinental Middleweight Championship (1 time)
  - IWRG Intercontinental Tag Team Championship (2 times) – with Oficial 911
  - IWRG Intercontinental Trios Championship (1 time) – with Oficial 911 and Oficial Fierro
- Mexico State Wrestling and Boxing Commission
  - Distrito Federal Trios Championship (2 times) – with Oficial 911 and Oficial Fierro

== Lucha de Apuesta record ==
Winner (wager)	Loser (wager)	Location	Event	Date	Notes
Oficial AK-47 (mask)	Arlequin (hair)	Naucalpan, Mexico State	IWRG show	December 21, 2008	(Note: Multi-man Steel Cage match that also included Scorpio, Jr., Fuerza Guerrera, Tetsuya, Cerebro Negro, Pierroth II, Zumbido, Máscara Año 2000 and Multifacético.)
Oficial AK-47 (mask)	Yack (mask)	Naucalpan, Mexico State	El Castillo del Terror	November 1, 2009	(Note: 10-man Steel Cage Match that also included Toxico, Xibalba, Fantasma de la Quebrada, Trauma I, Bobby Lee, Jr., Olímpico, Tinieblas, Jr. and Máscara Año 2000, Jr.)
Trauma I (mask)	Oficial AK-47 (mask)	Naucalpan, Mexico State	IWRG show	December 22, 2011	(Note: Relevos Suicidas: Lost to Oficial 911 and Trauma II and forced to wrestle each other)
Oficial Factor (hair)	Oficial AK-47 (hair)	Naucalpan, Mexico State	Guerra del Golfo	March 15, 2012	(Note: Steel cage match originally contested between Oficial 911 and Oficial Factor. Oficial AK-47, Oficial Fierro, Oficial Rayan and Oficial Spartans all entered the cage to interfere in the match.)
Draw	Bombero Infernal (hair); Oficial AK-47 (hair)	Naucalpan, Mexico State	Ruleta de la Muerte	September 6, 2012	
Apolo Estrada, Jr. (hair)	Oficial AK-47 (hair)	Naucalpan, Mexico State	IWRG show	December 1, 2013	(Note: Four-way elimination match, also involving El Hijo de Pirata Morgan and X-Fly.)
Tony Rivera (hair)	Oficial AK-47 (hair)	Naucalpan, Mexico State	IWRG show	March 16, 2014	
Oficial AK-47 (hair)	Mosco X-Fly (hair)	Naucalpan, Mexico State	IWRG show	December 21, 2014	(Note: Steel cage match, also involving Canis Lupus, Hijo de Máscara Año 2000, El Hijo de Pirata Morgan, Máscara Año 2000, Máscara Sagrada, Pirata Morgan, Rayo de Jalisco, Jr. and Súper Nova.)
Eterno (hair)	Oficial AK-47 (hair)	Naucalpan, Mexico State	IWRG show	September 14, 2015	
Dragon Bane (mask)	Oficial AK-47 (hair)	Naucalpan, Mexico State	Máscara vs. Cabellera	March 3, 2019	(Note: Match also included Dr. Cerebro and Death Metal.)
