= Oficial Fierro =

Mexican professional wrestler

Personal information
- Born: Fernando Montes; April 17, 1974 (age 52) Mexico City, Mexico

Professional wrestling career
- Ring name(s): Fierro / Oficial Fierro; Mercurio; El Millonario; Ultra Mega
- Billed height: 1.73 m (5 ft 8 in)
- Billed weight: 83 kg (183 lb)
- Trained by: Fuego Negro; Scorpio
- Debut: 1997

Fernando Montes (born February 14, 1974) is a Mexican professional wrestler, best known under the ring name Oficial Fierro. As Oficial Fierro he is part of a group called Los Oficiales that has worked for International Wrestling Revolution Group (IWRG) since 2007. The team held the record for the longest reigning Distrito Federal Trios Champions and are the most successful holders of the IWRG Intercontinental Trios Championship, holding it longer than any other trios team and having defended it more times than any previous champions have. Fierro is Spanish for Iron. He previously wrestled as Mercurio and El Millonario but achieved more success as Ultra Mega, part of Los Megas in IWRG where he held several championships. Oficial Fierro's real name was not a matter of public record, as is often the case with masked wrestlers in Mexico where their private lives are kept a secret from the wrestling fans, until he lost his mask in a match on November 1, 2012.

== Professional wrestling career ==
Fernando Montes made his professional wrestling debut in 1997, although it has never been publicly acknowledge which ring name he used at the time. In Mexico it is not unusual for wrestlers to gain in-ring experience under a generic enmascarado (masked) character early in their careers. In 1999 and 2000 he wrestled as "Mercurio", a low ranking enmascarado character in International Wrestling Revolution Group (IWRG). In 2000 he was repackaged as "El Millonario", a character patterned after both Ted DiBiase's "Million Dollar Man" character from the World Wrestling Federation and preexisting lucha libre character Vegas active in AAA and portrayed by several professional wrestlers. At the beginning of 2000 he lost his mask after a match with Fantasy in the finish of a relevos suicida bout.

=== Los Megas ===
In 2001 he underwent yet another character change as he was turned into "Ultra Mega" and made part of a new IWRG técnico (good guy) group called Los Megas. He teamed up with Mega and Super Mega, and later on Omega to form a kid-friendly, silver-and-black-clad team.

Mega, Super Mega, and Ultra Mega defeated Los Oficiales (Guardia, Oficial, and Vigilante) on August 2, 2001, to win the Distrito Federal Trios Championship, starting off a 161‑day‑long title reign. The trio were defeated for the title by Dr. Cerebro, Cirujano, and Paramedico on January 10, 2002. Only a month later Mega and Ultra Mega defeated Fantasy and Star Boy to win the IWRG Intercontinental Tag Team Championship. They team held the title for 73 days until losing to MAZADA and NOZAWA. Mega, Ultra Mega, and Omega teamed up to win the Distrito Federal Trios Championship at some point in 2002 and held the title until December 12, 2003, where they were defeated by Dr. Markus Jr., Dr. Muerte, Enfermero Jr. 2003 also saw Mega, Ultra Mega, and Omega win the IWRG Intercontinental Trios Championship from Nosawa, Takemura, and Masada on June 5, 2003. Mega and Ultra Mega also held the IWRG Tag team title for almost a year between 2003 and 2004, winning the championship from Fantasy and Star Boy and losing them to Dr. Cerebro and Bombero Infernal.

In 2003 IWRG also introduced a group designed to be the "archenemy" of Los Megas in the form of Comando Mega, Comando Gama and Comando Omega. The group feuded for the better part of a year. The storyline between the two factions saw Mega and Ultra Mega defeat Comando Mega and Comando Gama in a Lucha de Apuesta, mask vs. mask match on June 6, 2004. Following the end of the feud with the Comandos Los Megas began to fade away; some of the members lost their masks and made only sporadic appearances over the next year. Los Megas teamed together one last time in 2005 after not having worked as a team for over six months, they joined to lose the IWRG Intercontinental Trios Championship that they still held. On December 22, 2005, Ultra Mega was one of the participants in IWRG's annual Castillo del Terror ("Castle of Terror") event, a multi-man Steel Cage Match that came down to Ultra Mega and Nemesis. The last two competitors were forced to wrestle under Lucha de Apuesta rules in a match that Nemesis won, forcing Ultra Mega to unmask. Following his mask loss Ultra Mega turned rúdo (bad guy), but without the mask the Ultra Mega character did succeed.

=== Los Oficiales ===
In early 2007 IWRG officials decided to form a new version of the group Los Oficiales ("The Officials"), a masked trios group that all had a "police officer" ring character. The three masked men, Oficial 911, Oficial AK-47, and Oficial Fierro were unveiled at a Lucha Libre festival in May 2007. It was later revealed that Ultra Mega was the wrestler under the Oficial Fierro mask, just as other IWRG under-card wrestlers had been repackaged as Oficial 911 and Oficial AK-47. Oficial 911 was in fact Ultra Mega's old rival Comando Mega. On July 7, 2007, they defeated the Japanese trio of Kai, Sasaki, and Yamato to win the Distrito Federal Trios Championship, a title that had been relatively inactive up to a year before Los Oficiales won the belts.

Los Oficiales would go on to defend the Trios title on a regular basis, giving credibility to both the Trios championship and to Los Oficiales as a group. On September 28, 2008, Los Oficiales became double champions as they defeated Cyborg, Kraneo, Xibalva (who had all been members of previous incarnations of Los Oficiales) to win the IWRG Intercontinental Trios Championship. Their success in 2008 led to several Mexican publications naming Los Oficiales as the best Trio, or runner up for best Trios team for 2008. Los Oficiales' run as double Trios champions ended on December 7, 2008, when Los Terrible Cerebros (Black Terry, Dr. Cerebro and Cerebro Negro). Los Oficiales continued to defend the IWRG Trios title through 2009 and 2010 and as of April 21, 2010, they had made at least 9 successful defenses of the title, more than any previous title holder. Their success has also seen them named as the best version of Los Oficiales by far.

Oficial Fierro has also achieved individual success, including winning a number of Lucha de Apuesta or bet matches. On January 1, 2008, during IWRG's 12th anniversary show, Fierro defeated Tortuguillo Ninja I, a wrestler using a Teenage Mutant Ninja Turtle character, and forced him to unmask. On November 29, 2009, Oficial Fierro defeated Freelance in an Apuesta match, forcing Freelance to have his hair shaved off after the match per Lucha Libre traditions. On March 3, 2011, Los Oficiales lost the IWRG Intercontinental Trios Championship to Joe Líder, Silver King and Último Gladiador, ending their reign at 886 days. On November 1, 2012, at El Castillo del Terror, Fierro lost his mask to El Ángel in a twelve-man steel cage match. On February 7, 2013, Los Oficiales lost the Distrito Federal Trios Championship to El Hijo de Pirata Morgan, Pirata Morgan and Pirata Morgan, Jr.

== Championships and accomplishments ==
- International Wrestling Revolution Group
  - IWRG Intercontinental Tag Team Championship (3 times) – with Mega
  - IWRG Intercontinental Trios Championship (2 times) – with Mega and Omega (1), Oficial 911 and Oficial AK-47 (1)
- Mexico State Wrestling and Boxing Commission
  - Distrito Federal Trios Championship (4 times) – with Mega and Super Mega (2), Oficial 911 and Oficial AK-47 (2)

== Lucha de Apuesta record ==
Winner (wager)	Loser (wager)	Location	Event	Date	Notes
Los Megas (masks) (Mega and Ultra Mega)	Los Comandos (masks) (Comando Gama and Comando Mega)	Naucalpan, Mexico State	IWRG Show	June 6, 2004	
Nemesis (mask)	Ultra Mega (mask)	Naucalpan, Mexico State	El Castillo del Terror	December 22, 2005	(Note: Last two men in a multi-man Steel Cage match)
Oficial Fierro (mask)	Tortuguillo Ninja I (mask)	Naucalpan, Mexico State	Guerra del Golfo	January 10, 2008	
Oficial Fierro (mask)	Freelance (hair)	Naucalpan, Mexico State	35 años del Rayo de Jalisco Jr.	November 29, 2009	
El Ángel (mask)	Oficial Fierro (mask)	Naucalpan, Mexico State	El Castillo del Terror	November 1, 2012	(Note: Last two men in a multi-man Steel Cage match)
