= Oficial 911 =

Mexican professional wrestler

Personal information
- Born: José Ángel Bocanegra González; February 7, 1981 (age 45) Mexico City, Mexico

Professional wrestling career
- Ring name(s): 911/Oficial 911; Comando Mega
- Billed height: 1.73 m (5 ft 8 in)
- Billed weight: 84 kg (185 lb)
- Debut: 2001

José Ángel Bocanegra González (born February 7, 1981) is a Mexican professional wrestler, best known under the ring name Oficial 911. As Oficial 911 he is part of a group called Los Oficiales that has worked for International Wrestling Revolution Group (IWRG) since 2007. The team held the record for the longest-reigning Distrito Federal Trios Champions and are the most successful holders of the IWRG Intercontinental Trios Championship, holding it longer than any other trios team and having defended it more times than any previous champions have. Bocanegra previously wrestled as Comando Mega in IWRG as well.

== Professional wrestling career ==
Bocanegra began wrestling in 2001, although it has never been publicly acknowledged which ring name he used at the time. In Mexico, it is not unusual for wrestlers to gain in-ring experience under a generic masked character early in their careers. In 2003 he adopted the masked wrestler character "Comando Mega" in International Wrestling Revolution Group (IWRG), the name under which he first gained in-ring success. Comando Mega teamed up with Comando Gama and Comando Alfa as the "arch enemies" of an IWRG técnico (good guy) group called Los Megas (Mega, Super Mega and Ultra Mega). The storyline between the two factions saw Mega and Ultra Mega defeat Comando Mega and Comando Gama in a Lucha de Apuesta, mask vs. mask match on June 6, 2004. Following the loss both Comando Mega and Comando Gama were forced to unmask, effectively ending the storyline between the two factions. From 2005 until early 2007 Bocanegra worked as Comando Mega, often taking part in random mid-card trios matches.

=== Los Oficiales ===
In early 2007 IWRG officials decided to form a new version of the group Los Oficiales ("The Officials"), a masked trios group that all had a "Police officer" ring character. The three masked men, Oficial 911, Oficial AK-47 and Oficial Fierro were unveiled at a wrestling festival in May 2007. It was later revealed that Bocanegra was the wrestler under the Oficial 911 mask, just as other IWRG under-card wrestlers had been repackaged as Oficial AK-47 and Oficial Fierro. Oficial Fierro was in fact Bocanegra's old rival Ultra Mega. On July 7, 2007, the trio defeated Japanese trio of Kai, Sasaki and Yamato to win the Distrito Federal Trios Championship, a title that had been relatively inactive up for at least a year before Los Oficiales won the belts.

Los Oficiales defended the Trios title on a regular basis, giving credibility to both the Trios championship and to Los Oficiales as a group. On September 28, 2008, Los Oficiales became double champions as they defeated Cyborg, Kraneo, Xibalva (who had all been members of previous incarnations of Los Oficiales) to win the IWRG Intercontinental Trios Championship. Their success in 2008 led to several Mexican publications naming Los Oficiales as the best Trio, or runner up for best Trios team for 2008. Los Oficiales run as double Trio champions ended on December 7, 2008 when Los Terrible Cerebros (Black Terry, Dr. Cerebro and Cerebro Negro). Los Oficiales continued to defend the IWRG Trios title through 2009 and into 2010 where they had made at least 9 successful defenses of the title, more than any previous title holder, by April 21, 2010. Their success also saw them named the best version of Los Oficiales.

Oficial 911 has also achieved individual success, including winning a Lucha de Apuesta or bet match against then IWRG Intercontinental Lightweight Champion Tetsuya Bushi, forcing him to unmask after the match per Lucha Libre traditions. On March 3, 2011, Los Oficiales lost the IWRG Intercontinental Trios Championship to Joe Líder, Silver King, and Último Gladiador, ending their reign at 886 days. On July 17, Oficial 911 defeated Multifacético in a Lucha de Apuesta mask vs. mask match. In late November 2012 it was announced that 911, Oficial Factor, El Hijo de Pirata Morgan, and El Hijo de Máscara Año 2000 had all agreed to risk their masks in a Prison Fatal steel cage match on December 2, 2012. The last person in the steel cage would be forced to unmask. The Prison Fata match came down to Factor and Oficial 911 after the other two competitors escaped the cage. At one point all Oficiales and Oficiales Elite were actually in the cage, but in the end 911 managed to escape, forcing Factor to unmask. On February 7, 2013, Los Oficiales lost the Distrito Federal Trios Championship to El Hijo de Pirata Morgan, Pirata Morgan, and Pirata Morgan, Jr. Ten days later on February 17, Oficial 911 defeated El Ángel and Trauma II by countout, which meant that he would not be forced to put his mask on the line in a subsequent Luchas de Apuestas match, slated for March 3, 2013, while Trauma II and El Ángel would put their mask on the line. The decision was later reversed by the Mexico City wrestling commission, who stated that because 911 won by countout, he was put back in Luchas de Apuestas match. On the night 911 escaped with his mask safe, pining both Trauma II and El Ángel. In the end Trauma II pinned El Ángel even after Los Oficiales attacked both competitors. On December 19, Oficial 911 and Mosco X-Fly took part in a three-way tag team Lucha de Apuestas. The match ended with Golden Magic pinning 911 for the win, forcing X-Fly to have his head shaved and 911 to remove his mask and reveal his true identity. On June 15, 2014, 911 and AK-47 defeated Apolo Estrada, Jr. and El Hijo del Diablo to win the IWRG Intercontinental Tag Team Championship.

== Championships and accomplishments ==
- Alianza Universal de Lucha Libre
  - AULL Tag Team Championship (1 time) – with Oficial AK-47
- International Wrestling Revolution Group
  - IWRG Intercontinental Tag Team Championship (1 time) – with Oficial AK-47
  - IWRG Intercontinental Trios Championship (2 times) – with Oficial AK-47 and Oficial Fierro
  - Copa Higher Power (2010)
- Mexico State Wrestling and Boxing Commission
  - Distrito Federal Trios Championship (2 times) – with Oficial AK-47 and Oficial Fierro

== Lucha de Apuesta record ==
Winner (wager)	Loser (wager)	Location	Event	Date	Notes
Los Megas (masks) (Mega and Ultra Mega)	Los Comandos (masks) (Comando Gama and Comando Mega)	Naucalpan, Mexico State	IWRG show	June 6, 2004	
Cyborg and Oficial (hair)	Los Comandos (hair) (Comando Gama and Comando Mega)	Naucalpan, Mexico State	IWRG show	January 9, 2005	
Oficial 911 (mask)	Tetsuya Bushi (mask)	Naucalpan, Mexico State	IWRG show	December 3, 2009	
Oficial 911 (mask)	Multifacético IV (mask)	Naucalpan, Mexico State	IWRG show	July 17, 2011	
Oficial 911 (mask)	Oficial Factor (mask)	Naucalpan, Mexico State	Prison Fatal	December 2, 2012	(Note: Steel cage match, which originally also included El Hijo de Pirata Morgan and El Hijo de Máscara Año 2000. Oficial AK-47, Oficial Fierro, Oficial Rayan and Oficial Spartan all entered the cage to interfere in the match.)
Golden Magic (mask) and El Hijo de Pirata Morgan (hair)	Oficial 911 (mask) and Mosco X-Fly (hair)	Naucalpan, Mexico State	Arena Naucalpan 36th Anniversary Show	December 19, 2013	(Note: Elimination tag team match, also involving the team of Oficial Fierro and Trauma II.)
Danny Casas (hair)	Oficial 911 (hair)	Naucalpan, Mexico State	IWRG show	December 14, 2014	
