= Los Oficiales =

Professional wrestling stable

Stable
- Members: Oficial 911; Oficial AK-47; Oficial Fierro; Guardia; Maniac Cop; Oficial; Vigilante; Policeman I Policeman II; Version 2 Cyborg; Guardia; Oficial; Vigilante; Version 3 Cyborg; Polizon; Xibalba; Version 4 Ak-47 (I); Cyborg; Magnum Project; Version 5 Oficial Spartan
- Billed heights: Oficial 911 1.73 m (5 ft 8 in); Oficial AK-47 1.76 m (5 ft 9 1/2 in); Oficial Fierro 1.73 m (5 ft 8 in)
- Combined billed weight: 253 kg (558 lb)
- Debut: 1996

Los Oficiales (Spanish for "The Officials") was a Mexican professional wrestling group, called a stable. Los Oficiales was originally created in AAA.

== Los Oficiales Version 1 ==
The original Los Oficiales group was a concept created by AAA owner Antonio Peña that was unveiled in 1996. Los Oficiales initially consisted of Guardia, Oficial and Vigilante, three wrestlers dressed as motorcycle police, complete with nightsticks and motorcycle helmets that the trio used to cheat during matches. The characters were very clearly inspired by the World Wrestling Federation character "The Big Boss Man", played by Ray Traylor (at time, Traylor was competing in WCW with his own name and wouldn't have resumed the Bossman identity until 1998). On November 19, 1996 they defeated Los Villanos (Villano III, Villano IV and Villano V) to win the AAA Americas Trios Championship. Los Oficiales held the title until some point in early 1997 when Los Villanos regained the titles. Not long after the loss the trio was expanded with Maniac Cop, the first enmascarado Oficial, patterned after the Maniac Cop Movie. The trio of Maniac Cop, Oficial and Vigilante won the Distrito Federal Trios Championship, although no documentation of who they defeated to win the title has been found. At some point between 1997 and 1998 Los Oficiales left AAA and began working for the local promotion in Naucalpan, State of Mexico that would later evolve into International Wrestling Revolution Group (IWRG). In Naucalpan Maniac Cop turned on his partners, to form a group called La Escuadron De La Muerte ("The Death squad"), who also used "Police officer" ring personas. The feud between the two groups lasted until 1999 when La Escuadron slowly began to fade away from the IWRG.

== Los Oficiales Version 2 ==
After the feud with La Escuadron de la Muerte ended Los Oficiales regrouped and added the younger Cyborg to the group. Between 2000 and 2001 Guardia, Oficial and Vigilante held the Distrito Federal twice more. Later on Guardia, Oficial and Cyborg would go on to win the Distrito Federal Trios title as well. By 2005 the three veteran Oficiales, Guardia, Oficial and Vigilante reduced their roles in the group, allowing Cyborg to lead a new group of Oficiales.

== Los Oficiales Version 3 ==
Cyborg gathered a group consisting of himself, Polizon and Xibalba. Polizon was a gimmick taken for some time by the wrestler later known as Pierroth II while Xibalba had worked for IWRG under that name for many years before becoming part of the group. The third version of Los Oficiales was the least active as the three rarely teamed in the year or so it existed and never won any championships.

== Los Oficiales Version 4 ==
In 2006 Cyborg reformed Los Oficiales once again with himself, Magnum Project and AK-47. AK-47 had formerly worked as Bombero Infernal and only wrestled as AK-47 for a matter of months before moving on to a new character called "Kraneo" ("Skull"). Oficiales V4 never won a title, although Cyborg and AK-47 (billed as Kranero) teamed up with Xibalba to win the IWRG Intercontinental Trios Championship – while they were never billed as "Los Oficiales" the team was a mix of V3 and V4.

== Los Oficiales Version 5 ==
In the spring of 2007 IWRG officials decided to form a new version of Los Oficiales, selecting three IWRG regulars to be repackaged as the masked Oficial 911, Oficial AK-47 and Oficial Fierro. The team was unveiled at a Lucha Libre festival in May, 2007 and immediately began working in the Trios division. On July 7, 2007 the trio defeated the Japanese trio of Kai, Sasaki and Yamato to win the Distrito Federal Trios Championship, a title that had been relatively inactive up for at least a year before Los Oficiales won the belts.

Often IWRG introduces a new "concept" Trio that fades away after a few months, but this version Los Oficiales sustained their success by repeatedly defending the Trios title against such teams as the tecnico team of Freelance, Kid Tiger and Star Boy, former Oficiales Capitan Muerte, Cyborg and Xibalba and rudos Los Payasos (Coco Verde, Cocochips, Cocolores), successfully taking on all comers, regardless of them being tecnicos or rudos. Los Oficiales would go on to defend the Trios title nine times all together, giving credibility to both the Trios championship and to Los Oficiales as a group.

On September 28, 2008 Los Oficiales became double champions as they defeated Cyborg, Kraneo, Xibalva (who had all been members of previous incarnations of Los Oficiales under various names) to win the IWRG Intercontinental Trios Championship. Los Oficiales run as double Trio champions ended on December 7, 2008 when Los Terrible Cerebros (Black Terry, Dr. Cerebro and Cerebro Negro). After the loss of the Distrito Federal Trios title the team focused on the IWRG Trios title and establishing their dominance in the IWRG Trios division. Los Oficiales would go on to have a series of successful title defenses against Black Terry, Cerebro Negro and Dr. Cerebro as well as Zatura, Pendulo, Multifacético and the rudo team of Arlequin, Hijo de Pierroth and Pierroth II. Their success in 2008 led to several Mexican publications naming Los Oficiales as the best Trio, or runner up for best Trios team for 2008.

Throughout 2009 Los Oficiales has been involved in several feuds, especially a very bloody feud with Los Traumas (Trauma I and Trauma II) and Negro Navarro (their father). As well as the father son team of Pirata Morgan, El Hijo de Pirata Morgan and Barba Roja, who have all unsuccessfully challenged Los Oficiales for the Trios title. Los Oficiales continued to defend the IWRG Trios title through 2009 and into 2010 where they as of April 21, 2010 are still the champions, having made at least 9 successful defenses of the title, more than any previous title holder. Their success has also seen them named as the best version of Los Oficiales by far. On March 3, 2011, Los Oficiales lost the IWRG Intercontinental Trios Championship to Joe Líder, Silver King and Último Gladiador, ending their reign at 886 days. On July 17 the group was joined by Oficial Spartan. On October 9, after costing Los Oficiales a match via disqualification, 911 and Fierro turned on Spartans and kicked him out of the group. Los Oficiales then began feuding with Spartans and the debuting Oficial Rayan, who named their new group Los Oficiales Elite. On December 22, Oficial AK-47 teamed with Trauma I to face Oficial 911 and Trauma II in a Relevos Suicidas match and after losing the match, AK-47 and Trauma I were forced to face each other in a Mask vs. Mask match. Eventually, Trauma I won the match via disqualification, forcing AK-47 to unmask himself. On November 1 at Castillo del Terror, another Oficial, Fierro, lost his mask in a twelve-man steel cage match. On February 7, 2013, Los Oficiales lost the Distrito Federal Trios Championship to El Hijo de Pirata Morgan, Pirata Morgan and Pirata Morgan, Jr. On December 19, Oficial 911 was also forced to unmask, when he and Mosco X-Fly were defeated by Golden Magic and El Hijo de Pirata Morgan in a three-way tag team Lucha de Apuestas. On June 15, 2014, 911 and AK-47 defeated Apolo Estrada, Jr. and El Hijo del Diablo to win the IWRG Intercontinental Tag Team Championship.

== Championships and accomplishments ==
Version 1

- AAA
  - AAA Americas Trios Championship (1 time) – Guardia, Oficial, Vigilante
- Mexico State Wrestling and Boxing Commission
  - Distrito Federal Trios Championship (1 time) – Guardia, Oficial and Vigilante (2), Maniac Cop, Oficial and Vigilante (1)

Version 2

- Mexico State Wrestling and Boxing Commission
  - Distrito Federal Trios Championship (3 times) – Guardia, Oficial and Vigilante (2), Guardia, Oficial and Cyborg (1)

Version 4

- International Wrestling Revolution Group
  - IWRG Intercontinental Trios Championship (1 time) – Cyborg, AK-47 (I) / Kraneo and Xibalba

Version 5

- Alianza Universal de Lucha Libre
  - AULL Tag Team Championship (1 time, current) – Oficial 911 and Oficial AK-47
- International Wrestling Revolution Group
  - IWRG Intercontinental Middleweight Championship (1 time) – Oficial AK-47
  - IWRG Intercontinental Tag Team Championship (2 times) – Oficial 911 and Oficial AK-47
  - IWRG Intercontinental Trios Championship (1 time) – Oficial 911, Oficial AK-47 and Oficial Fierro
  - Copa Higher Power (2010) – Oficial 911
- Mexico State Wrestling and Boxing Commission
  - Distrito Federal Trios Championship (2 times) – Oficial 911, Oficial AK-47 and Oficial Fierro
