= List of IWRG shows =

Shows by International Wrestling Revolution Group

The Mexican professional wrestling promotion International Wrestling Revolution Group (IWRG) has produced and scripted a number of wrestling shows since their creation on January 1, 1996 by promoter Adolfo "Pirata" Moreno. Some of these shows have become annual events, some are special one-off events, normally indicated by a special main event match or being promoted under a special name, and some are IWRG's normally scheduled Wednesday or Sunday shows. Many of the annual and special events are headlined by a Lucha de Apuestas, or "bet match", where a wrestler will put his wrestling mask or hair on the line.

The longest-running recurring IWRG show is the Arena Naucalpan Anniversary Show, which started in 1978, making it the second longest-running professional wrestling recurring show series, only surpassed by the Consejo Mundial de Lucha Libre Anniversary Shows that began in 1934. It is the only regular IWRG show that predates the creation of IWRG itself. IWRG's second-longest-running show is their IWRG Anniversary Shows, starting on January 1, 1997, and held within the first couple of days of January. Throughout the year IWRG promotes several other recurring events such as the El Castillo del Terror ("The Tower of Terror"), Legado Final ("Final Legacy") or Guerra del Golfo ("The Gulf War"). They also hold several annual tournament such as El Protector, Rey del Ring ("King of the Ring") and Rebelión de los Juniors amongst others.

== History ==
Wrestler-turned-promoter Adolfo "Pirata" Moreno began promoting wrestling shows in his native Naucalpan de Juárez, State of Mexico, bringing in wrestlers from Empresa Mexicana de Lucha Libre (EMLL) to Naucalpan as well as featuring wrestlers from the Mexican independent circuit. Later on he would promote shows mainly in "Arena KO Al Gusto" and served as the Universal Wrestling Association (UWA) partner, using the name Promociones Moreno as the business name for his promotional efforts. In 1977 Moreno bought the run down Arena KO Al Gusto and had Arena Naucalpan built in its place, an arena designed specifically for wrestling shows, with a maximum capacity of 2,400 spectators for the shows. Arena Naucalpan became the permanent home for Promociones Moreno, with very few shows held elsewhere. The Arena Naucalpan 1st Anniversary Show was held in December 1978, becoming an annual show for Moreno. The Arena Naucalpan Anniversary Show is the second oldest annual professional wrestling show, only predated by the Consejo Mundial de Lucha Libre Anniversary Shows that started in 1934. In the 1990s the UWA folded and Promociones Moreno worked primarily with EMLL, now rebranded as Consejo Mundial de Lucha Libre (CMLL).

In late 1995 Adolfo Moreno decided to create his own promotion, creating a regular roster instead of relying totally on wrestlers from other promotions, creating the International Wrestling Revolution Group (IWRG; sometimes referred to as Grupo Internacional Revolución in Spanish) on January 1, 1996. From that point on Arena Naucalpan became the main venue for IWRG, hosting the majority of their weekly shows and all of their recurring and named shows as well. The first verified recurring show held by IWRG was the Arena Naucalpan 19th Anniversary show held in December 1996.

== Recurring shows ==
Over the years IWRG has created a number of recurring events, some on an annual basis that IWRG has held year after year since the show was created, other events that they will run on a regular basis although not always at the same time each year, sometimes holding multiple events in one year, other times not holding a specific event in a year. Each year on or close to January 1 IWRG holds their IWRG Anniversary Shows to celebrate their creation on January 1, 1996. Some years the show is promoted specifically under that label, other times they combine the anniversary celebration with another of their annual shows.

The oldest show after the anniversary shows is the IWRG Prisión Fatal ("Deadly Prison") show, with the first being held in 2000, then again in 2009 and then 2012, from then on a regular basis since then. The main event of the Prisión Fatal is a multi-man steel cage match contested under Lucha de Apuestas, or "bet match", rules where the loser would be forced to unmask. the Lucha de Apuestas steel cage match is one of IWRG's signature matches as they promote a number of those matches each year on a regular basis such as IWRG El Castillo del Terror ("Tower of Terror") and IWRG Guerra del Golfo ("Gulf War"). They have also held various one-off steel cage centered shows such as IWRG Guerra del Sexos ("Battle of the Sexes"), an inter-gender match that allows both male and female wrestler to fight each other. Other steel cage match shows have included IWRG La Jaula del Honor ("The Cage of Honor") and IWRG La Jaula de la Muerte ("The Cage of Death").>

IWRG also holds a number of annual tournaments, the oldest still ongoing tournament being the IWRG Rey del Ring ("King of the Ring"), an annual 30-man tournament held almost every year since 2002. In 2011 IWRG began holding an IWRG La Gran Cruzada ("The Great Crusade") tournament, with the winner challenging the Rey del Ring champion at a later date. Since 2010 IWRG has held the IWRG El Protector tournament once a year, a tag team tournament where a rookie and a veteran wrestler are teamed up for a one-night tournament. In the fall IWRG often holds IWRG La Guerra Revolucionaria ("The Revolutionary War"), a one night multi-man torneo cibernetico elimination tournament.

Mexican professional wrestling has a very strong family tradition and IWRG honors this with various shows and tournaments throughout the year, including the father/son tournament IWRG Legado Final ("Final Legacy"), as well as their annual IWRG Rebelión de los Juniors ("The Junior Rebellion"), and finally their recurring IWRG Guerra de Familias ("War of the Families") show.

=== Pre IWRG shows ===
Date	Event	Main Event	Ref.
December 1978	Arena Naucalpan 1st Anniversary Show	Unknown	
December 19, 1979	Arena Naucalpan 2nd Anniversary Show	Black Man, El Santo, and Mil Máscaras vs. Dr. Wagner, Negro Navarro, and Villano III	
December 1980	Arena Naucalpan 3rd Anniversary Show	Unknown	
December 1981	Arena Naucalpan 4th Anniversary Show	Unknown	
December 22, 1982	Arena Naucalpan 5th Anniversary Show	Los Misioneros de la Muerte (El Signo, El Texano and Negro Navarro) vs. Los Villanos (Villano I, Villano II and Villano III in a best two-out-of-three-falls six-man tag team match	
December 21, 1983	Arena Naucalpan 6th Anniversary Show	Trio Fantastico (Black Man, Kato Kung Lee, and Kung Fu) vs. Los Misioneros de la Muerte (El Signo, Negro Navarro, and El Texano)	
December 1984	Arena Naucalpan 7th Anniversary Show	Unknown	
December 1985	Arena Naucalpan 8th Anniversary Show	Unknown	
December 1986	Arena Naucalpan 9th Anniversary Show	Unknown	
December 1987	Arena Naucalpan 10th Anniversary Show	Unknown	
December 1988	Arena Naucalpan 11th Anniversary Show	Unknown	
December 1989	Arena Naucalpan 12th Anniversary Show	Unknown	
December 1990	Arena Naucalpan 13th Anniversary Show	Unknown	
December 1991	Arena Naucalpan 14th Anniversary Show	Unknown	
December 16, 1992	Arena Naucalpan 15th Anniversary Show	Bestia Salvaje vs. El Dandy for the CMLL World Middleweight Championship	
December 1993	Arena Naucalpan 16th Anniversary Show	Unknown	
December 1994	Arena Naucalpan 17th Anniversary Show	Unknown	
December 17, 1995	Arena Naucalpan 18th Anniversary Show	Kraneo vs. Sable in a Lucha de Apuestas match	

=== IWRG shows in the 1990s ===
Date	Event	Main Event	Ref.
January 7, 1996	First IWRG Show	Fantastik and Mr. Niebla (c) vs Antifaz and Scorpio Jr. for the Naucalpan Tag Team Championship	
June 9, 1996	Máscara vs. Máscara	Dr. Cerebro vs. Cerebro	
December 1996	Arena Naucalpan 19th Anniversary Show	Unknown	
January 1997	IWRG 1st Anniversary Show	Unknown	
January 27, 1997	Máscara vs. Máscara	Neblina vs. La Cobra	
February 9, 1997	IWRG show	Villano III vs. El Mastodonte Lucha de Apuestas steel cage match	
August 10, 1997	Máscara vs. Máscara	Bombero Infernal vs. Neblina	
November 16, 1997	Máscara vs. Máscara	Bombero Infernal vs. Enemigo Publico	
December 7, 1997	Máscara vs. Máscara	Pantera vs. Bombero Infernal	
December 1997	Arena Naucalpan 20th Anniversary Show	Unknown	
January 4, 1998	IWRG 2nd Anniversary Show	Judo Suwa, Shiima Nobunaga and Sumo Fuji (c) defeated Los Super Payasos (Bruly, Circus and Rody) for the Distrito Federal Trios Championship	
July 26, 1998	Máscara vs. Máscara	Dr. Cerebro vs. Oro Jr.	
August 23, 1998	Cabellera vs. Cabellera	Suicida vs. Bombero Infernal	
December 13, 1998	Cabellera vs. Cabellera	Suicida vs. Star Boy	
December 20, 1998	Arena Naucalpan 21st Anniversary Show	Eight-man Ruleta de la Muerte tournament	
January 1999	IWRG 3rd Anniversary Show	Unknown	
March 7, 1999	Máscara vs. Máscara	Kato Kung Lee Jr. vs. Punch Power	
March 21, 1999	La Guerra Sin Escape	El Brazo, Brazo Cibernético, Mr. Niebla, Moon Walker, Kato Kung Lee and El Salsero vs. Bombero Infernal, Fireman and Los Oficiales (Maniacop, El Vigilante, Oficial and Guardia) in a steel cage match	
April 22, 1999	Máscara vs. Cabellera	Bombero Infernal vs. Fireman	
November 4, 1999	Relevos Suicida	El Matador and El Torero vs. Fuerza Guerrera and Suicida	
December 5, 1999	Cabellera vs. Cabellera	Bombero Infernal vs. Kato Kung Lee	
December 19, 1999	Arena Naucalpan 22nd Anniversary Show	El Hijo del Santo vs. Scorpio Jr. for the El Copa del Mileno trophy	

=== IWRG shows in 2000 ===
Date	Event	Main Event	Ref.
January 2, 2000	IWRG 4th Anniversary Show	Susumu Mochizuki and Yasushi Kanda vs. Black Dragón and Fantasy, tournament final for the IWRG Intercontinental Tag Team Championship	
February 3, 2000	Prisión Fatal	12-man Lucha de Apuestas steel cage match	
February 13, 2000	Máscara vs. Máscara	Guardia, Oficial, and Vigilante vs Cyborg, Maniacop, and Vader Cop, "Captain's Mask" match	
February 20, 2000	Relevos Suicida	El Millonario and Fantasy vs Punch Power and Star Boy	
April 16, 2000	Cabellera vs. Cabellera	Cyborg vs. Rody	
June 15, 2000	Cabellera vs. Cabellera	Ciclón Ramírez vs. Bombero Infernal	
November 2, 2000	El Castillo del Terror	multi-man Lucha de Apuestas steel cage match	
December 17, 2000	Arena Naucalpan 23rd Anniversary Show	Último Vampiro vs. Oficial in a Lucha de Apuestas match	
December 24, 2000	Máscara vs. Máscara	Bestia Rubia vs Zonik	

=== IWRG shows in 2001 ===
Date	Event	Main Event	Ref.
January 1, 2001	IWRG 5th Anniversary Show	Bombero Infernal, El Enterrador and Los Megas (Mega and Super Mega) vs. Black Dragon, Kato Kung Lee, Mike Segura and Tony Rivera	
February 15, 2001	Copa Ovaciones	El Felino vs. Blue Panther	
March 1, 2001	Máscara vs. Máscara	El Hijo del Santo vs Dr. Cerebro	
March 4, 2001	Cabellera vs. Cabellera	Suicida vs. Súper Mega	
May 1, 2001	Cabellera vs. Cabellera	Rambo vs. Oficial	
May 31, 2001	Cabelleras vs. Cabelleras	Suicida and Último Vampiro vs. Masada and Nosawa	
June 21, 2001	Cabelleras vs. Cabelleras	Villano III vs. Rambo	
September 16, 2001	Cabellera vs. Cabellera	Fantasy vs. Bombero Infernal	
December 20, 2001	Arena Naucalpan 24th Anniversary Show	Último Vampiro vs. El Enterrador in a Luchas de Apuestas match	

=== IWRG shows in 2002 ===
Date	Event	Main Event	Ref.
January 2, 2002	IWRG 6th Anniversary Show	El Pantera and Pentagón Black vs. Bombero Infernal and Último Vampiro	
April 21, 2002	Rey del Ring	30 man Rey del Ring tournament	
October 13, 2002	El Castillo del Terror	10-man Lucha de Apuestas steel cage match	
December 19, 2002	Arena Naucalpan 25th Anniversary Show	El Hijo del Santo vs. Scorpio Jr. in a Lucha de Apuestas match	

=== IWRG shows in 2003 ===
Date	Event	Main Event	Ref.
January 1, 2003	IWRG 7th Anniversary Show	Último Vampiro vs Bombero Infernal in a Luchas de Apuestas match	
November 2, 2003	El Castillo del Terror	10-man Lucha de Apuestas steel cage match	
December 21, 2003	Arena Naucalpan 26th Anniversary Show	Avisman vs. Cerebro Negro in a Lucha de Apuestas match	

=== IWRG shows in 2004 ===
Date	Event	Main Event	Ref.
January 1, 2004	IWRG 8th Anniversary Show	Brazo de Plata, Fantasy and El Felino vs. Cerebro Negro, Mike Segura and Scorpio Jr.	
March 18, 2004	Rey del Ring	30 man Rey del Ring tournament	
October 31, 2004	El Castillo del Terror	Multi-Man Lucha de Apuestas steel cage match	
December 19, 2004	Arena Naucalpan 27th Anniversary Show	Dr. Cerebro vs. Masada in a Lucha de Apuestas match.	

=== IWRG shows in 2005 ===
Date	Event	Main Event	Ref.
January 2005	IWRG 9th Anniversary Show	Unknown	
July 30, 2005	La Copa Black Shadow	Villano III and Gallo Tapado Jr. vs. Rambo and Bobby Lee Jr.vs. Brazo de Plata Jr. and Brazo de Oro	
November 3, 2005	El Castillo del Terror	10-Man steel cage match	
November 17, 2005	Rey del Ring	30 man Rey del Ring tournament	
December 22, 2005	Arena Naucalpan 28th Anniversary Show / Guerra del Golfo	El Felino vs. Mephisto vs. Pierroth vs. Stuka Jr. vs. Ultra Mega vs. Matrix vs. Nitro vs. El Pantera vs.El Sagrado vs. Némesis	

=== IWRG shows in 2006 ===
Date	Event	Main Event	Ref.
January 1, 2006	IWRG 10th Anniversary Show	Cerebro Negro vs. El Enterrador 2000 vs. Scorpio Jr. vs. Veneno vs. Xibalba vs. Cyborg in a six-way Lucha de Apuestas match	
November 2, 2006	El Castillo del Terror	9-Man Lucha de Apuestas steel cage match	
December 21, 2006	Arena Naucalpan 29th Anniversary Show	Black Warrior vs. Cerebro Negro vs. Coco Verde vs Coco Rojo vs. Dr. Cerebro vs. El Felino vs. Mr. Niebla vs. El Sagrado vs. Negro Casas vs. Olímpico vs. El Veneno vs. Xibalba in a Ruleta de la Muerte tournament	

=== IWRG shows in 2007 ===
Date	Event	Main Event	Ref.
January 2007	IWRG 10th Anniversary Show	Unknown	
July 19, 2007	Noches de Campeones	Los Capos Junior (El Hijo del Cien Caras and Máscara Año 2000 Jr.) (c) vs. El Hijo del Solitario and Pierroth	
July 26, 2007	Rey del Ring	30 man Rey del Ring tournament	
November 1, 2007	El Castillo del Terror	9-Man Lucha de Apuestas steel cage match	
December 20, 2007	Arena Naucalpan 30th Anniversary Show	Bogeman, El Hijo del Santo and El Pantera vs. Cerebro Negro, El Hijo del Cien Caras and Villano III	

=== IWRG shows in 2008 ===
Date	Event	Main Event	Ref.
January 2008	IWRG 11th Anniversary Show	Unknown	
January 10, 2008	Guerra del Golfo	Oficial Fierro vs Tortuguillo Ninja I in a Lucha de Apuestas steel cage match	
May 28, 2008	Caravana de Campeones	El Hijo del Cien Caras and Máscara Año 2000 Jr. (c) vs, El Dandy and Silver King in a tag team match for the IWRG Intercontinental Tag Team Championship	
July 24, 2008	Rey del Ring	30 man Rey del Ring tournament	
August 21, 2008	Festival de las Máscaras	El Audaz, Dr. Wagner Jr. and Rayo de Jalisco Jr. vs. Cien Caras, Máscara Año 2000 and Universo 2000	
November 2, 2008	El Castillo del Terror	10-Man Lucha de Apuestas steel cage match	
December 19, 2008	Arena Naucalpan 31st Anniversary Show	El Hijo del Cien Caras and Máscara Año 2000 Jr. (c) vs. Los Guapos (Scorpio Jr. and Zumbido) for the IWRG Intercontinental Tag Team Championship	
December 21, 2008	El Castillo del Terror	10-Man Lucha de Apuestas steel cage match	

=== IWRG shows in 2009 ===
Date	Event	Main Event	Ref.
January 1, 2009	Guerra del Golfo / IWRG 12th Anniversary Show	Dr. Cerebro vs. Cerebro Negro in a Lucha de Apuestas steel cage match	
January 25, 2009	México vs. El Resto del Mundo	Freelance, Péndulo and Scorpio Jr. vs. Andy Barrow, Tetsuya Bushi and El Veneno	
February 7, 2009	México vs. El Resto del Mundo	El Hijo del Solitario, El Fantasma Jr. and Rayo de Jalisco Jr. Tetsuya Bushi The Headhunters	
March 15, 2009	Caravana de Campeones	El Hijo del Cien Caras and Máscara Año 2000 Jr. (c) vs. The Headhunters (Headhunter A and Headhunter B) in a tag team match for the IWRG Intercontinental Tag Team Championship	
March 29, 2009	Guerra Revolucionaria	20 man Lumberjack Torneo Cibernetico match	
July 2, 2009	El Gran Desafío	Juventud Guerrera vs. Dr. Cerebro in a Lucha de Apuestas match	
July 5, 2009	Prisión Fatal	Avisman vs. Freelance vs. Tetsuya Bushi vs. Mike Segura in a Lucha de Apuesta steel cage match	
July 16, 2009	Rey del Ring	30 man Rey del Ring tournament	
August 20, 2009	Festival de las Máscaras	Kahoz, Máscara Año 2000 and Sangre Chicana vs. El Fantasma, Mano Negro and Villano III	
August 27, 2009	25 Años de Scorpio Jr.	Scorpio Jr. and Villano III vs. Headhunter A and Sangre Chicana	
September 16, 2009	Guerra del Golfo	Arlequín Rojo vs. Rigo in a Lucha de Apuestas steel cage match	
October 22, 2009	El Gran Desafío Femenil – Sin Empate, Sin Indulto	Flor Metálica vs. Atsuko Emoto, Lucha de Apuestas, hair vs. hair match	
November 1, 2009	El Castillo del Terror	10-Man Lucha de Apuestas steel cage match	
November 5, 2009	Ruleta de la Muerte	Gringo Loco vs. Chico Che in a Lucha de Apuestas match	
November 26, 2009	25 Años de El Pantera	Angélico, Brazo de Plata and El Pantera vs. Máscara Año 2000 Jr., Oficial 911 and Pirata Morgan	
November 29, 2009	35 Años de Rayo de Jalisco Jr.	Angélico, Rayo de Jalisco Jr. and Scorpio Jr. vs. Oficial 911, Tóxico and El Veneno	
December 17, 2009	Arena Naucalpan 32nd Anniversary Show	Capitán Muerte vs. Exodia vs. Fantasma de la Ópera vs. El Hijo del Pirata Morgan vs. Péndulo vs. Tóxico vs Trauma I vs Ultramán Jr. vs. Xibalba vs. Zatura in a Lucha de Apuestas steel cage match	

=== IWRG shows in 2010 ===
Date	Event	Main Event	Ref.
January 1, 2010	Proyeccion a Nuevas Promesas / IWRG 13th Anniversary Show	Hijo del Signo and Dr. Cerebro vs. Comando Negro and Oficial 911	
January 3, 2010	IWRG 13th Anniversary Show	Dr. Cerebro vs. Cerebro Negro in a Lucha de Apuestas steel cage match	
February 28, 2010	Guerra del Golfo	El Hijo del Diablo vs. Chico Che in a Lucha de Apuestas steel cage match	
March 21, 2010	El Gran Desafío	Dr. Cerebro (c) vs. El Hijo del Diablo (c) IWRG Intercontinental Lightweight Championship and WWS World Welterweight Championship match	
May 13, 2010	Ojo por Ojo y Diente por Diente	Los Maniacos (Electroshock and Silver King) vs. Máscara Año 2000 and Máscara Año 2000 Jr.	
May 20, 2010	La Guerra Continua	El Hijo del Cien Caras, Máscara Año 2000 and Máscara Año 2000 Jr. vs. Alex Koslov, Chessman and Dark Cuervo	
June 24, 2010	La Guerra Continua	Dr. Wagner Jr., El Hijo del Cien Caras and Máscara Año 2000 vs. Los Maniacos (Eketroshock, Silver King and Último Gladiador)	
July 23, 2010	Festival de las Máscaras	El Canek, Scorpio Jr. and Tinieblas Jr. vs. El Hijo del Cien Caras, Máscara Año 2000 and Universo 2000	
October 3, 2010	Guerra de Empresas	Los Junior Dinamitas (El Hijo del Cien Caras and Máscara Año 2000, Jr.) vs. Dr. Wagner, Jr. and La Parka vs, Crazy Boy and Joe Líder vs. Los Compadres (Chucho el Roto and Iron Love) vs.Los Maniacos (Electroshock and Silver Cain) vs. Los Perros del Mal (Bestia 666 and Damian 666)	
October 21, 2010	Choque de Empresas	Los Maniacos (Electroshock and Silver King) vs the Mexican Power (Crazy Boy and Joe Líder) in an Extreme Rules Match	
October 28, 2010	Encandenados	Electroshock vs. Joe Líder and Silver King in a three-way bull terrier match	
October 31, 2010	Guerra Revolucionaria	20 man Lumberjack Torneo Cibernetico	
November 4, 2010	El Castillo del Terror	12-Man Lucha de Apuestas steel cage match	
December 12, 2010	Homenaje a el Hijo del Cien Caras	El Hijo de L.A. Park, L.A. Park and Máscara Año 2000 Jr. defeated El Hijo del Pirata Morgan, Silver King and Último Gladiador	
December 16, 2010	Arena Naucalpan 33rd Anniversary Show	La Sociedad (Chris Stone, Hernandez and Silver Cain) vs. Dr. Wagner Jr., Electroshock and Máscara Año 2000 Jr.	

=== IWRG shows in 2011 ===
Date	Event	Main Event	Ref.
January 2, 2011	Guerra de Empresas / IWRG 15th Anniversary Show	Los Psycho Circus (Murder Clown and Psycho Clown) vs. Los Perros del Mal (Super Crazy and X-Fly)	
January 2011	Proyeccion a Nuevas Promesas	Comando Negro and Scorpio Jr. vs Multifacético and Trauma I	
January 30, 2011	Caravana de Campeones	Los Oficiales (Oficial 911, Oficial AK-47 and Oficial Fierro) (C) vs. Los Perros del Mal (Bestia 666, Damian 666 and X-Fly) in a best two-out-of-three falls match for the IWRG Intercontinental Trios Championship	
February 6, 2011	Junior de Juniors	IWRG Junior de Juniors Championship tournament	
February 7, 2011	La Jaula del Honor	Los Perros del Mal (Bestia 666, Damian 666 and Halloween) vs. Los Psycho Circus (Monster Clown, Murder Clown and Psycho Clown) vs. Los Oficiales (Oficial 911, Oficial AK-47 and Oficial Fierro)	
March 6, 2011	La Epoca de Oro	El Pantera, Rayo de Jalisco Jr. and Tinieblas Jr. vs. Halloween, Lizmark Jr. and Pirata Morgan	
March 10, 2011	En Memoriam de Anibal	Los Perros del Mal (Bestia 666, Damián 666 and X-Fly) vs. Joe Líder and Los Maniacos (Silver King and Último Gladiador	
March 16, 2011	Ex-CMLL vs. El Torero de Cuatro Caminos	Rayo de Jalisco Jr., El Pantera and Scorpio Jr. vs. El Canek, Headhunter A and Enrique Vera	
March 27, 2011	Rebelión de los Juniors	El Hijo de Pirata Morgan vs. Trauma ILuchas de Apuestas, mask vs. IWRG Junior de Juniors Championship match.	
March 31, 2011	Unidos por un Amigo	Blue Demon Jr., Tinieblas Jr. and El Veneno vs. El Hijo del Solitario, Fuerza Guerrera and Lizmark Jr.	
April 3, 2011	Guerra del Golfo	Multifacético vs Destroyer in a Lucha de Apuestas steel cage match	
April 7, 2011	Triangula de Trios	Los Oficiales (Oficial 911, Oficial AK-47 and Oficial Fierro) defeated Los Perros del Mal (Bestia 666, Damián 666 and X-Fly) vs. Los Psycho Circus (Monster Clown, Murder Clown and Psycho Clown)	
April 17, 2011	Guerra Revolucionaria	20-Man Battle Royal	
April 24, 2011	Guerra de Empresas	Los Psycho Circus (Monster Clown, Murder Clown and Psycho Clown) vs. Joe Líder and Los Maniacos (Silver Cain and Último Gladiador) vs. Los Oficiales (Oficial 911, Oficial AK-47 and Oficial Fierro), vs. Los Perros del Mal (Bestia 666, Damian 666 and X-Fly)	
May 1, 2011	Choque de Empresas	Los Psycho Circus (Psycho Clown, Murder Clown and Monster Clown) vs. Pirata Morgan, El Hijo de L.A. Park and Bestia 666	
May 19, 2011	La Revancha	Los Perros del Mal (Bestia 666, Damián 666 and X-Fly) vs. Los Psycho Circus (Monster Clown, Murder Clown and Psycho Clown)	
June 2, 2011	Legado Final	Los Brazos (El Brazo and El Hijo del Brazo) vs. Los Piratas (Pirata Morgan and El Hijo de Pirata Morgan) vs. Los Panteras (Pantera and El Hijo del Pantera) vs. La Dinastia de la Muerte (Negro Navarro and Trauma I) vs. Máscara Año 2000 and Máscara Año 2000, Jr. vs. El Solar and Fresero, Jr.	
June 16, 2011	Rey del Ring	30 man Rey del Ring tournament	
June 26, 2011	La Vengenza	Argos, Máscara Año 2000 Jr. and El Pantera vs. Silver King and Los Oficiales (Oficial AK-47 and Oficial Fierro)	
July 3, 2011	Festival de las Máscaras	El Canek, Rayo de Jalisco, Jr. and Konnan vs. Los Hermanos Dinamita (Cien Caras, Máscara Año 2000 and Universo 2000)	
July 17, 2011	El Gran Desafío	Oficial 911 vs. Multifacético in a Lucha de Apuestas match	
August 28, 2011	La Jaula de la Muerte	Los Perros del Mal (Bestia 666, Damián 666 and X-Fly) vs. Los Psycho Circus (Monster Clown, Murder Clown and Psycho Clown) vs. (Kortiz, Ray Mendoza, Jr. and Villano IV) vs. Los Nuevo Temerarios (Black Terry, Durok, Machín)	
September 1, 2011	Choque de Juniors	Ray Mendoza Jr., Trauma I and El Hijo del Dr. Wagner Jr. vs. Máscara Año 2000 Jr., El Hijo del Médico Asesino and El Hijo de L.A. Park	
September 4, 2011	40 Años de Dos Caras	La Tercia Real (Dos Caras, Mil Máscaras and Sicodélico) vs. La Dinastía Imperial (Villano III, Villano IV and Ray Mendoza Jr.)	
September 16, 2011	Guerra de Sexos	10-person Lucha de Apuestas steel cage match	
October 16, 2011	Dr. Wagner 50th Anniversary Show	Taboo vs. Silver Cain vs. Dr. Wagner, Jr. vs. La Parka	
November 3, 2011	El Castillo del Terror	10-Man Lucha de Apuestas steel cage match	
November 13, 2011	La Gran Cruzada	30-Man Battle Royal	
November 20, 2011	Copa Revolucionaria	El Pantera vs. Trauma I for the IWRG Rey del Ring Championship	
November 27, 2011	36 Años de Rayo de Jalisco Jr.	Rayo de Jalisco Jr., El Solar and Villano IV vs. La Braza, Máscara Año 2000 and Negro Navarro	
November 29, 2011	Batalla Extrema	Último Gladiador and Aero Boy vs. Joe Líder and Drastik Boy vs. X-Fly and Pesadilla in a 3-Way Extreme Rules Match	
December 4, 2011	49th Anniversary of Lucha Libre in Estado de México	El Canek, La Braza, Headhunter A and Negro Navarro vs. El Texano Jr., Lizmark Jr., Rayman and Rayo de Jalisco Jr.	
December 22, 2011	Arena Naucalpan 34th Anniversary Show	Oficial 911 and Trauma II vs. Oficial AK-47 and Trauma I in a Relevos Suicidas match	
December 25, 2011	Guerra de Campeones	La Parka and Octagón vs. Chessman and Silver Cain, Steel Cage Match for the Mexican National Tag Team Championship	

=== IWRG shows in 2012 ===
Date	Event	Main Event	Ref.
January 1, 2012	IWRG 16th Anniversary Show	Multifacético vs. Apolo Estrada, Jr. in a Lucha de Apuestas match	
January 12, 2012	El Protector	Imposible and X-Fly vs. El Centvrión and Negro Navarro	
February 5, 2012	Guera de Sexos	12-person Lucha de Apuestas steel cage match	
March 4, 2012	IWRG Contra Restos de la Empresas	Máscara Año 2000 Jr. and Eterno defeated Drago and El Mesías	
March 15, 2012	Rebelión de los Juniors	Bestia 666 vs. Apolo Estrada, Jr. vs. Carta Brava, Jr. vs. El Canek, Jr. vs. El Hijo de L.A. Park vs.El Hijo de Dr. Wagner, Jr. vs. Halcón 78 Jr. vs. Hijo de Pirata Morgan vs. Máscara Sagrada, Jr. vs. Ultraman, Jr.	
April 8, 2012	Guerra de Familias	Dr. Wagner Jr. and El Hijo de Dr. Wagner Jr. vs. La Parka and Taboo vs. Silver King and Silver King Jr.	
April 15, 2012	Guerra del Golfo	Oficial AK-47 vs. Oficial 911 vs. Oficial Factor vs. Oficial Fierro vs. Oficial Rayan vs Oficial Spartan in a Lucha de Apuestas steel cage match	
May 6, 2012	Caravana de Campeones	La Dinastia de la Muerte (Negro Navarro and Trauma I) (C) vs. La Familia de Tijuana (Bestia 666 and Damian 666) in a tag team best two-out-of-three falls tag team match for the IWRG Intercontinental Tag Team Championship	
May 31, 2012	Rey del Ring	30 man Rey del Ring tournament	
June 3, 2012	15 Aniversario de CIMA	CIMA, Negro Navarro and Trauma II vs. La Familia de Tijuana (Damián 666, Super Nova and X-Fly)	
June 24, 2012	Legado Final	Los Piratas (Hijo de Pirata Morgan and Pirata Morgan) vs. Danny Casas and Ultraman vs. El Hijo del Pantera and El Pantera vs. La Familia de Tijuana (Bestia 666 and Damian 666) vs, Los Hermanos Dinamita, Jr. (Cien Caras, Jr. and Hijo de Máscara Año 2000) vs. Máscara Sagrada and Máscara Sagrada, Jr.	
July 8, 2012	Guerra de Empresas	Cibernético and La Parka vs. Los Hermanos Dinamita Jr. (Cien Caras Jr. and Hijo de Máscara Año 2000)	
August 2, 2012	Festival de las Máscaras	El Canek, Octagón and El Solar vs. Cien Caras, Jr., Fuerza Guerrera and Negro Navarro	
August 5, 2012	La Gran Cruzada	IWRG Rey del Ring #1 Contendership 30-Man Battle Royal	
August 12, 2012	Caravana de Campeones	Los Oficiales (Oficial 911, Oficial AK-47 and Oficial Fierro) (C) vs. La Familia de Tijuana (Bestia 666, Damian 666 and Super Nova) in a best two-out-of-three falls six-person tag team match for the Distrito Federal Trios Championship	
September 6, 2012	Ruleta de la Muerte	Oficial AK-47 vs. Súper Nova vs. Veneno vs. Eterno vs. Hijo de Máscara Año 2000 vs. Trauma I vs. Temerario Infernal vs. Hijo de Pirata Morgan	
November 1, 2012	El Castillo del Terror	12-Man Lucha de Apuestas steel cage match	
December 2, 2012	Prisión Fatal	Factor vs. El Hijo de Pirata Morgan vs. El Hijo de Máscara Año 2000 vs. Oficial 911 in a Lucha de Apuestas steel cage match	
December 20, 2012	Arena Naucalpan 35th Anniversary Show	Dr. Wagner, Jr. and El Hijo de Dr. Wagner, Jr. vs. El Canek and El Canek, Jr. vs. La Familia de Tijuana (Damian 666 and X-Fly) vs. Los Hermanos Dinamita, Jr. (Hijo de Máscara Año 2000 and Máscara Año 2000, Jr.) vs. Los Piratas (Hijo de Pirata Morgan and Pirata Morgan) in a five team steel cage match	

=== IWRG shows in 2013 ===
Date	Event	Main Event	Ref.
January 1, 2013	IWRG 17th Anniversary Show	Oficial 911 and El Ángel vs. Oficial Factor and Hijo de Pirata Morgan in a Relevos Suicidas tag team match	
January 17, 2013	El Protector	Carta Brava Jr. and X-Fly vs. Eita and Negro Navarro	
March 17, 2013	Prisión Fatal	Pirata Morgan vs. Máscara Año 2000 Jr. vs. Rayo de Jalisco Jr. vs. Cien Caras Jr. in a Lucha de Apuestas steel cage match	
March 31, 2013	La Guerra de Familias	Los Junior Dinamitas (Cien Caras, Jr. and Hijo de Máscara Año 2000) vs. Las Traumas (Trauma I and Trauma II)	
April 18, 2013	Guerra del Golfo	Apolo Estrada Jr. vs. Chico Che in a Lucha de Apuestas steel cage match	
May 9, 2013	Rebelión de los Juniors	Carta Brava Jr. vs. Hijo de Máscara Año 2000 vs. Apolo Estrada Jr. vs. Freyser vs. Cien Caras, Jr. vs. El Hijo de Dr. Wagner vs. Super Nova vs. El Hijo del Pirata Morgan vs. Trauma I vs. Trauma II	
May 19, 2013	Rey del Ring	30 man Rey del Ring tournament	
June 23, 2013	Prisión Fatal	Dr. Cerebro vs. X-Fly in a Prisión Fatal "Bull Terrier" Steel cage match	
August 11, 2013	Festival de las Máscaras	Rayo de Jalisco Jr., El Solar and El Veneno vs. Pirata Morgan, Universo 2000 and Villano IV	
August 15, 2013	Caravana de Campeones	Trauma II vs Súper Nova for the IWRG Junior de Juniors Championship	
October 3, 2013	Invasion RCH/IWRG	L.A. Park vs. Dr. Wagner Jr. vs. El Canek in a 50.000 Pesos Three Way Elimination Match	
October 27, 2013	Ruleta de la Muerte	La Sádica vs. Bugambilia in a Lucha de Apuestas match	
November 3, 2013	El Castillo del Terror	10-Man Lucha de Apuestas steel cage match	
November 10, 2013	Guerra Revolucionaria	20 man lumberjack Torneo Cibernetico	
November 24, 2013	Caravana de Campeones	Oficial 911 (c) defeated El Hijo del Máscara Año 2000 in a singles match for the IWRG Rey del Ring Championship	
December 19, 2013	Arena Naucalpan 36th Anniversary Show	Oficial Fierro and Trauma II vs Golden Magic and El Hijo del Pirata Morgan vs. Oficial 911 and X-Fly	

=== IWRG shows in 2014 ===
Date	Event	Main Event	Ref.
January 1, 2014	IWRG 18th Anniversary Show	Cien Caras, Jr., Super Nova and X-Fly vs. Lizmark, Jr., Vampiro Canadiense and Villano IV	
February 4, 2014	El Protector	Electro Boy and Super Nova defeated Atomic Star and Eterno	
February 17, 2014	Rebelión de los Juniors	Super Nova vs. El Hijo de Dos Caras vs. El Hijo de Fishman vs. Freesero Jr. vs. Hijo de Máscara Año 2000 vs. Hijo de Pirata Morgan vs. Lizmark Jr. vs. Trauma I	
March 16, 2014	Guerra del Golfo	Tony Rivera vs. Oficial AK-47 in a Lucha de Apuestas steel cage match	
May 4, 2014	Rey del Ring	30 man Rey del Ring tournament	
May 25, 2014	Prisión Fatal	El Hijo de Pirata Morgan vs. X-Fly vs. Eterno vs. El Hijo de Máscara Año 2000 in a Lucha de Apuestas steel cage match	
June 15, 2014	Festival de las Máscaras	Dr. Wagner, Jr., El Hijo de Dos Caras vs. L.A. Park and Pirata Morgan	
July 9, 2014	Sin Escape Con Correas	Diva Salvaje, Dr. Cerebro and Veneno vs. Canis Lupus, Eterno and Fuerza Guerrera in a lumberjack with leather straps match	
August 27, 2014	Prisión Fatal	Ciclon Black vs. Alan Extreme vs. Chucho el Roto vs. Golden Magic vs. Metaleón vs. Relámpago vs. Tony Rivera vs. Yakuza	
August 31, 2014	La Isla	Demon Clown vs. Dr. Wagner Jr. vs. Trauma I vs. El Hijo de Dos Caras vs. Veneno vs. L.A. Park vs. Oficial AK-47 vs. Hijo de Máscara Año 2000 in a ladder match	
November 2, 2014	El Castillo del Terror	11-Man Lucha de Apuestas steel cage match	
November 16, 2014	39 Anos de Rayo de Jalisco Jr.	El Hijo de Dos Caras, Rayo de Jalisco Jr. and El Veneno vs. El Hijo del Máscara Año 2000, Pirata Morgan and Eterno	
December 7, 2014	52nd Anniversary of Lucha Libre in Estado de México	Toscano vs. El Veneno in a Luchas de Apuestas match	
December 17, 2014	Caravana de Campeones	Los Gringos VIP (Apolo Estrada Jr., Avisman and El Hijo del Diablo) (c) vs. Chicano, Danny Casas and Hip Hop Man	
December 21, 2014	Arena Naucalpan 37th Anniversary Show	Oficial AK-47 vs. Canis Lupus vs. Hijo del Máscara Año 2000 vs. El Hijo del Pirata Morgan vs Máscara Año 2000 vs. Máscara Sagrada vs. Pirata Morgan vs. Rayo de Jalisco Jr. vs. Súper Nova vs. X-Fly in a Prisión Fatal steel cage match	
