= Guerra del Golfo (2016) =

2016 International Wrestling Revolution Group event

- Official poster featuring the originally announced 20 competitors
- Promotion: International Wrestling Revolution Group
- Date: April 17, 2016
- City: Naucalpan, State of Mexico
- Venue: Arena Naucalpan

Event chronology
← Previous; Rebelión de los Juniors	Next → Festival de las Máscaras

Guerra del Golfo chronology
← Previous; 2015	Next → 2017

Guerra del Golfo (2016) (Spanish for "Gulf War") was a major lucha libre, or professional wrestling, event produced by the Mexican professional wrestling promotion International Wrestling Revolution Group (IWRG) that took place on April 17, 2016. The show was the ninth year in a row that IWRG has held a Guerra del Golfo show, which usually takes places in the early spring.

The eponymous Guerra del Golfo tournament consists of three matches in total, with two "qualifying matches", multi-man steel cage matches where the last person left in the cage is "punished" by advancing to the main event of the night. The two losers were then forced to wrestle inside the steel cage under Lucha de Apuestas, or "bet match", rules. Astro Jr. lost the last Guerra del Golfo cage match to Dr. Cerebro and thus had to remove his mask and reveal his real name as a result of the loss.

== Production ==
=== Background ===
The Mexican wrestling promotion International Wrestling Revolution Group (IWRG; Sometimes referred to as Grupo Internacional Revolución in Spanish) has a long-standing history of holding major event focused on a multi-man steel cage match where the last wrestler left in the cage would be forced to either remove their wrestling mask or have their hair shaved off under Lucha de Apuestas, or "bet match", rules. In 2005 IWRG created a specific spring-time show promoting the steel cage match concept under the name Guerra del Golfo, or "Gulf War", referring to the Gulf of Mexico (not the Gulf War in the middle east). The Guerra del Golfo shows featured two "qualifying" multi-man steel cage matches where the loser would later be forced to face off against each other in the main event of the show. In the final cage match the two wrestlers would wrestle where the loser would be forced to either unmask or, if they are not wearing a mask, have his hair shaved off. The use of the steel cage in three matches distinguishes the Guerra del Golfo event from other Steel cage matches held throughout the year such as the IWRG El Castillo del Terror ("The Tower of Terror"), IWRG Guerra de Sexos ("War of the Sexes"), or IWRG Prison Fatal ("Deadly Prison") shows.

The first two Guerra del Golfo steel cage matches are contested under elimination match rules, which means wrestlers escape the cage by climbing over the top of the steel cage to the floor. The last wrestler in the cage will be put in the final match of the night. Unlike the first two steel cage matches the final match is normally contested under pinfall rules. At the 2012 Guerra del Golfo the final match ended up differently than announced. Oficial Factor and Oficial 911 were supposed to face off one on one, but Factor's teammates Oficial Rayan and Oficial Spartan as well as Oficial 911's teammates Oficial AK-47 and Oficial Fierro all climbed into the cage to turn it into an elimination match. In the end Oficial AK-47 lost the match, despite not originally being in the match.

The Guerra del Golfo shows, as well as the majority of the IWRG shows in general, are held in "Arena Naucalpan", owned by the promoters of IWRG and is their home arena, with the group rarely venturing outside of Naucalpan. The 2016 Guerra del Golfo show was the tenth IWRG promoted a show under that name, and the ninth year in a row since becoming an annual event from 2008 forwardand the eleventh Guerra del Golfo show owing to IWRG holding two events in 2009. Prior to the 2016 event three wrestlers had lost their masks; Ultra Mega, Tortuguillo Ninja I, and Destroyer, while seven wrestlers were shaved bald; Cerebro Negro, Arlequín Rojo, Chico Che (twice), Oficial AK-47 (twice), and Danny Casas.

=== Storylines ===
The event featured six professional wrestling matches with different wrestlers involved in pre-existing scripted feuds, plots and storylines. Wrestlers were portrayed as either heels (referred to as rudos in Mexico, those that portray the "bad guys") or faces (técnicos in Mexico, the "good guy" characters) as they followed a series of tension-building events, which culminated in a wrestling match or series of matches.

in 2016 IWRG booked 10 wrestlers for each of the two 2016 La Guerra del Golfo elimination steel cage matches where each wrestler would be forced to defend either their mask or their hair. The first Guerra del Golfo match included Mr. Águila (hair), Astro (mask), Bestia 666 (hair), Apolo Estrada Jr. (hair), Golden Magic (mask), El Hijo del Diablo (hair), Oficial AK-47 (hair), Rafy (mask), Halloween (mask) and Veneno (hair). The other Guerra del Golfo match included Black Terry (hair), Danny Casas (hair), Damián 666 (hair), Dr. Cerebro (hair), Eterno (hair), El Hijo de Dos Caras (mask), Leo (mask), Máscara Sagrada (mask), Mike (mask) and Oficial Fierro (hair). Super Nova and Canis Lupus were originally scheduled for the show but were replaced by Black Terry and Halloween.

Of the 20 competitors, two have previously lost a Guerro del Golfo; Oficial AK-47 twice (mask, then hair) and Danny Casas (hair) while Oficial Fierro, El Hijo del Diablo, Ofical Factor and Apolo Estrada Jr. have won a Guerrero del Golfo match. Golden Magic had the most success in IWRG steel cage matches, having won four versions of the El Castillo del Terror match, while Oficial Fierro has lost an El Castillo del Terror match. Oficial Factor lost his mask in the 2012 Prison Fatal cagematch, while Dr. Cerebro won the June 2013 Prison Fatal match. This was the first Lucha de Apuestas match for two of the members of the Tortugas Ninjas group (Mike and Leo) while Rafy successfully defended his mask in the 2015 El Castillo del Terror match. Astral Jr. and former IWRG Intercontinental Heavyweight Champion El Hijo de Dos Caras have never been in a Lucha de Apuestas cage match prior to the 2016 Guerra de Golfo.

== Event ==
In the first of the qualifying Guerra del Golfo steel cage matches, the young enmascarado (masked wrestler) Astro Jr. as the last man in the cage, forcing him to compete again later in the night. The second steel cage match saw the unmasked Dr. Cerebro was the last man in the cage, forcing him to wrestle against Astral only moments later. In the final match Dr. Cerebro pinned Astro forcing him to unmask and state his actual name, Emanuel Marin Jacome, as the lucha libre traditions dictate. Marin had originally worked as "Astro Rey Jr." and claimed he was the nephew of Alberto Leonel Hernández López, better known as Astro Rey in the 1970s and 1980s and the cousin of the original Astro Rey Jr. Later the name was shortened to simply "Astro Jr." and then "Astro", due to objections from Hernández although it is unclear if Astro never gained permission to use the name in the first place or if he had a falling out with Hernández after initially being allowed to use the name. It is not uncommon for wrestlers to use the name and mask of older wrestlers, paying for the name recognition as they pretend to be the son (or daughter) or a well known wrestler.

On the undercard the Exótico (male wrestlers in drag) team of Diva Salvaje, Miss Gaviota and Pasion Kristal defeated Los Comandos Elite (Factor, Rayan and Spector), a trio of wrestlers portraying a police riot squad.

== Results ==
No.	Results	Stipulations
1	Galaxy and El Picudo Jr. defeated Black Dragón and Dragón Fly	tag team match
2	El Divo and Freyser defeated the Tiger and Violencia Jr.	Tag team match
3	Diva Salvaje, Miss Gaviota and Pasion Kristal defeated Los Comandos Elite (Factor, Rayan and Spector)	Six-man "Lucha Libre rules" tag team match
4	Canis Lupus, Danny Casas, Damián 666, Eterno, El Hijo de Dos Caras, Leo, Máscara Sagrada, Mike and Oficial Fierro defeated Dr. Cerebro	2016 La Guerra del Golfo semi-finals – ten-man elimination steel cage match
5	Mr. Águila, Bestia 666, Apolo Estrada Jr., Golden Magic, El Hijo del Diablo, Oficial AK-47, Rafy, Súper Nova and Veneno defeated Astro	2016 La Guerra del Golfo semi-finals – ten-man steel elimination cage match
6	Dr. Cerebro defeated Astro	2016 La Guerra del Golfo finals – Steel Cage, Luchas de Apuestas, mask/hair vs. mask/hair match
