= Guerra del Golfo (2017) =

2017 International Wrestling Revolution Group event

- Official poster for the event
- Date: April 16, 2017
- City: Naucalpan, State of Mexico
- Venue: Arena Naucalpan

Event chronology
← Previous; Rebelión de los Juniors	Next → Rey del Ring

IWRG Guerra del Golfo chronology
← Previous; 2016	Next → 2018

The Guerra del Golfo (2017) (Spanish for "Gulf War") was a major annual lucha libre event produced and scripted by the Mexican professional wrestling promotion International Wrestling Revolution Group (IWRG) that took place on April 16, 2017. The show was the 10th year in a row that IWRG has held a Guerra del Golfo show, which usually takes places in the early spring, around March or April.

The eponymous Guerra del Golfo tournament consists of three matches in total, with two "qualifying matches", multi-man steel cage matches where the last person left in the cage is "punished" by advancing to the main event of the night. The two losers were then forced to wrestle inside the steel cage under Lucha de Apuestas, or "bet match", rules. For the 2017 "Guerra del Golfo" Freelance lost the main event match to Máscara Año 2000 Jr. and Veneno despite not originally being part of the match. On the undercard Herodes Jr. successfully defended the IWRG Junior de Juniors Championship against El Hijo de Pirata Morgan. The show featured three additional matches.

== Production ==
=== Background ===
The Mexican wrestling promotion International Wrestling Revolution Group (IWRG; Sometimes referred to as Grupo Internacional Revolución in Spanish) has a long-standing history of holding major event focused on a multi-man steel cage match where the last wrestler left in the cage would be forced to either remove their wrestling mask or have their hair shaved off under Lucha de Apuestas, or "bet match", rules. In 2005 IWRG created a specific spring-time show promoting the steel cage match concept under the name Guerra del Golfo, or "Gulf War", referring to the Gulf of Mexico (not the Gulf War in the middle east). The Guerra del Golfo shows featured two "qualifying" multi-man steel cage matches where the loser would later be forced to face off against each other in the main event of the show. In the final cage match the two wrestlers would wrestle where the loser would be forced to either unmask or, if they are not wearing a mask, have his hair shaved off. The use of the steel cage in three matches distinguishes the Guerra del Golfo event from other Steel cage matches held throughout the year such as the IWRG El Castillo del Terror ("The Tower of Terror"), IWRG Guerra de Sexos ("War of the Sexes"), or IWRG Prison Fatal ("Deadly Prison") shows.

The first two Guerra del Golfo steel cage matches are contested under elimination match rules, which means wrestlers escape the cage by climbing over the top of the steel cage to the floor. The last wrestler in the cage will be put in the final match of the night. Unlike the first two steel cage matches the final match is normally contested under pinfall rules. At the 2012'Guerra del Golfo the final match ended up differently than announced. Oficial Factor and Oficial 911 were supposed to face off one on one, but Factor's teammates Oficial Rayan and Oficial Spartan as well as Oficial 911's teammates Oficial AK-47 and Oficial Fierro all climbed into the cage to turn it into an elimination match. In the end Oficial AK-47 lost the match, despite not originally being in the match.

The Guerra del Golfo shows, as well as the majority of the IWRG shows in general, are held in "Arena Naucalpan", owned by the promoters of IWRG and is their home arena, with the group rarely venturing outside of Naucalpan. The 2017 Guerra del Golfo show was the eleventh IWRG promoted a show under that name, and the tenthyear in a row since becoming an annual event from 2008 forwardand the eleventh Guerra del Golfo show owing to IWRG holding two events in 2009. Prior to the 2017 event four wrestlers had lost their masks; Ultra Mega, Tortuguillo Ninja I, Destroyer, and Astro, while seven wrestlers were shaved bald; Cerebro Negro, Arlequín Rojo, Chico Che (twice), Oficial AK-47 (twice), and Danny Casas.

== Event ==
The Guerra del Golfo event featured five professional wrestling matches with different wrestlers involved in pre-existing scripted feuds, plots and storylines. Wrestlers were portrayed as either heels (referred to as rudos in Mexico, those that portray the "bad guys") or faces (técnicos in Mexico, the "good guy" characters) as they followed a series of tension-building events, which culminated in a wrestling match or series of matches.

Super Mega was originally booked for the first of the two Guerra del Golfo steel cage matches, but for unexplained reasons, Gringo Loco returned to IWRG after an over six-year absence to compete in the match. For the first match Apolo Estrada Jr., Freelance, El Hijo del Diablo, Gringo Loco, and Máscara Año 2000 Jr. risked their hair, while Pantera I, Tortuga Mike and Trauma I risked their mask. In the end, Máscara Año 2000 Jr. lost the match and was forced to compete in the main event.

In the second "Guerra del Golfo" qualifying steel cage match the referee ejected Hip Hop Man from the match, stating that he did not have enough hair to risk. In his place El Hijo del Alebrije was added to the match. Veneno, Black Terry and Cerebro Negro risked their hair, while El Diablo Jr., Emperador Azteca, Golden Magic, El Hijo del Alebrije, Imposible, Trauma II, and Villano IV defended their mask in the cage. In the end. Veneno ended up being left in the cage, which meant he had to risk his hair in the main event of the night.

The main event match started out with Veneno and Máscara Año 2000 Jr. fighting in the cage, with both wrestlers trying to escape the cage to win the match. At one point Veneno was almost at the top of the cage when Freelance unexpectedly entered the arena and prevented Veneno from leaving the cage. Moments later Freelance climbed in the ring to attack Veneno, only for both Veneno and Máscara Año 2000 Jr. leaving the cage. As a result, the referee decided that Freelance would be shaved bald despite not originally being in the match.

== Results ==
No.	Results	Stipulations
1	Skanda defeated Lunatic Xtreme	Singles match
2	Aramís defeated Shadow Boy	Singles match
3	Danny Casas and Heddi Karaoui defeated Black Dragón and Demonio Infernal	Six-man tag team match
4	Herodes Jr. (C) defeated El Hijo de Pirata Morgan	Singles match for the IWRG Junior de Juniors Championship
5	Máscara Año 2000 Jr. lost to Bobby Lee Jr., Dr. Cerebro, Apolo Estrada Jr., Freelance, Gringo Loco, El Hijo del Diablo, Pantera I, Tortuga Leo, and Trauma I	10-man steel cage match
6	Veneno lost to Black Terry, Cerebro Negro, Diablo Jr., Emperador Azteca, Golden Magic, El Hijo del Alebrije, Imposible, Trauma II, and Villano IV	10-man steel cage match
7	Freelance lost to Máscara Año 2000 Jr., Veneno	Lucha de Apuestas, hair vs. hair vs. hair steel cage match
