= Guerra del Golfo (2015) =

2015 International Wrestling Revolution Group event

- Official poster showing the 16 cage match competitors
- Promotion: International Wrestling Revolution Group
- Date: March 15, 2015
- City: Naucalpan, State of Mexico
- Venue: Arena Naucalpan

Event chronology
← Previous; Rebelión de los Juniors	Next → Rey del Ring

Guerra del Golfo chronology
← Previous; 2014	Next → 2016

Guerra del Golfo (2015) (Spanish for "Gulf War") was the eight installment of an annual professional wrestling major event produced by Mexican professional wrestling promotion International Wrestling Revolution Group (IWRG), which took place on March 15, 2015 in Arena Naucalpan, Naucalpan, State of Mexico, Mexico. The annual Guerra del Golfo main event consists of three matches in total, with two "qualifying matches", multi-man steel cage matches where the last person left in the cage advances to the main event of the night. The two losers would then be forced to wrestle inside the steel cage, with the loser of that match being forced to either take off their wrestling mask or have their hair shaved off under Lucha de Apuestas, or "Bet match" rules, if they are unmasked.

== Production ==
=== Background ===
Starting as far back as at least 2000, the Mexican wrestling promotion International Wrestling Revolution Group (IWRG; Sometimes referred to as Grupo Internacional Revolución in Spanish) has held several annual events where the main event was a multi-man steel cage match where the last wrestler left in the cage would be forced to either remove their wrestling mask or have their hair shaved off under Lucha de Apuestas, or "bet match", rules. From 2005 IWRG has promoted a spring time show promoting the steel cage match concept under the name Guerra del Golfo, or "Gulf War", referring to the Gulf of Mexico, not the Gulf War in the middle east. The Gurerra del Golfo shows featured two "qualifying" steel cage matches where the loser would later be forced to face off against each other in the main event of the show, a final cage match where the loser would be forced to either unmask or have his/her hair shaved off. The use of the steel cage in three matches distinguishes the Guerra del Golfo event from other Steel cage matches held throughout the year such as the IWRG El Castillo del Terror ("The Tower of Terror"), IWRG Guerra de Sexos ("War of the Sexes") or IWRG Prison Fatal ("Deadly Prison") shows. The Guerra del Golfo shows, as well as the majority of the IWRG shows in general, are held in "Arena Naucalpan", owned by the promoters of IWRG and their main arena. The 2015 Guerra del Golfo show was the ninth year IWRG promoted a show under that name and the eight year in a row since becoming an annual event from 2008 forward.

=== Storylines ===
The event featured six professional wrestling matches with different wrestlers involved in pre-existing scripted feuds, plots and storylines. Wrestlers were portrayed as either heels (referred to as rudos in Mexico, those that portray the "bad guys") or faces (técnicos in Mexico, the "good guy" characters) as they followed a series of tension-building events, which culminated in a wrestling match or series of matches.

== Results ==
No.	Results	Stipulations
1^{D}	Atomic Star defeated Omega	Singles match
2	Emperador Azteca and Metaleon defeated Hip Hop Man and Imposible	Best two-out-of-three falls tag team match
3	Negro Navarro and Comandos Elite (Rayan and Spector) defeated Black Terry, Chicano and El Hijo de Dos Caras	Best two-out-of-three falls six-man "Lucha Libre rules" tag team match
4	Oficial 911, Cien Caras Jr., Eterno, El Hijo del Diablo, El Hijo de Fishman, Hijo del Máscara Año 2000 and Veneno defeated Danny Casas	La Guerra del Golfo semi-finals - eight-man steel cage match
5	Oficial AK-47, Apolo Estrada Jr., El Hijo de L.A. Park, Máscara Sagrada, Oficial Rayan, Relámpago and Universo 2000 Jr. defeated X-Fly	La Guerra del Golfo semi-finals - eight-man steel cage match
6	X-Fly defeated Danny Casas	La Guerra del Golfo finals - Steel Cage, Luchas de Apuestas, hair vs. hair match
D / – this was a dark match
