= Guerra del Golfo (2018) =

2018 International Wrestling Revolution Group event

- Official poster showing all steel cage match participants
- Date: April 15, 2018
- City: Naucalpan, State of Mexico
- Venue: Arena Naucalpan

Event chronology
← Previous; Cabellera vs. Cabellera	Next → Rey del Ring

IWRG Guerra del Golfo chronology
← Previous; 2017	Next → 2019

The 2018 Guerra del Golfo (Spanish for "Gulf War") was a major lucha libre event produced and scripted by the Mexican professional wrestling promotion International Wrestling Revolution Group (IWRG) that took place on April 15, 2018. The show was the 11th year in a row that IWRG has held a Guerra del Golfo show, which usually takes place around March or April.

The eponymous Guerra del Golfo tournament consists of three matches in total, with two "qualifying matches", multi-man steel cage matches where the last person left in the cage is "punished" by advancing to the main event of the night. The two losers were then forced to wrestle inside the steel cage under Lucha de Apuestas, or "bet match", rules. For the 2018 Guerra del Golfo, Teelo and Mike, both representing the group Los Tortugas Ninjas ("The Ninja Turtles"), lost their respective cage matches and were forced to fight each other. In the end, Teelo lost and was forced to unmask and reveal his given name, Mario Rodolfo Martinez Sanchez, to the audience. The show featured three additional matches

== Production ==
=== Background ===
The Mexican wrestling promotion International Wrestling Revolution Group (IWRG; Sometimes referred to as Grupo Internacional Revolución in Spanish) has a long-standing history of holding major event focused on a multi-man steel cage match where the last wrestler left in the cage would be forced to either remove their wrestling mask or have their hair shaved off under Lucha de Apuestas, or "bet match", rules. In 2005 IWRG created a specific spring-time show promoting the steel cage match concept under the name Guerra del Golfo, or "Gulf War", referring to the Gulf of Mexico (not the Gulf War in the middle east). The Guerra del Golfo shows featured two "qualifying" multi-man steel cage matches where the loser would later be forced to face off against each other in the main event of the show. In the final cage match the two wrestlers would wrestle where the loser would be forced to either unmask or, if they are not wearing a mask, have his hair shaved off. The use of the steel cage in three matches distinguishes the Guerra del Golfo event from other Steel cage matches held throughout the year such as the IWRG El Castillo del Terror'("The Tower of Terror"), IWRG Guerra de Sexos ("War of the Sexes"), or IWRG Prison Fatal ("Deadly Prison") shows.

The first two Guerra del Golfo steel cage matches are contested under elimination match rules, which means wrestlers escape the cage by climbing over the top of the steel cage to the floor. The last wrestler in the cage will be put in the final match of the night. Unlike the first two steel cage matches the final match is normally contested under pinfall rules. At the 2012 Guerra del Golfo the final match ended up differently than announced. Oficial Factor and Oficial 911 were supposed to face off one on one, but Factor's teammates Oficial Rayan and Oficial Spartan as well as Oficial 911's teammates Oficial AK-47 and Oficial Fierro all climbed into the cage to turn it into an elimination match. In the end Oficial AK-47 lost the match, despite not originally being in the match.

The Guerra del Golfo shows, as well as the majority of the IWRG shows in general, are held in "Arena Naucalpan", owned by the promoters of IWRG and is their home arena, with the group rarely venturing outside of Naucalpan. The 2016 Guerra del Golfo show was the tenth IWRG promoted a show under that name, and the ninth year in a row since becoming an annual event from 2008 forwardand the eleventh Guerra del Golfo show owing to IWRG holding two events in 2009. Prior to the 2018 event four wrestlers had lost their masks; Ultra Mega, Tortuguillo Ninja I, Destroyer, and Astro, while seven wrestlers were shaved bald; Cerebro Negro, Arlequín Rojo, Chico Che (twice), Oficial AK-47 (twice), and Danny Casas.

=== Storylines ===
The event featured five professional wrestling matches with different wrestlers involved in pre-existing scripted feuds, plots and storylines. Wrestlers were portrayed as either heels (referred to as rudos in Mexico, those that portray the "bad guys") or faces (técnicos in Mexico, the "good guy" characters) as they followed a series of tension-building events, which culminated in a wrestling match or series of matches.

== Results ==
No.	Results	Stipulations
1	Toto defeated Power Bull	Best two-out-of-three-falls match
2	Black Dragon, Chico Che and Mexica defeated Apolo Estrada Jr., Dragon Bane and Gallo Frances by disqualification	Best two-out-of-three-falls six-man tag team match
3	Los Tortugas Ninjas (Leo and Rafy) and Veneno defeated Los Inferno Rockers (Demon Rocker and Devil Rocker) and Eterno by disqualification	Best two-out-of-three-falls six-man tag team match
4	Diablo Jr. and Capo del Norte and Dinamic Black and Emperador Azteca and Machine Rocker and Oficial Spector and Trauma II defeated Mike	Steel cage match
5	El Hijo de Canis Lupus and Aramís and El Hijo del Medico Asesino and El Pantera II and Imposible and Super Brazo Jr. defeated Teelo	Steel cage match
6	Mike defeated Teelo	Lucha de Apuestas, mask vs. mask steel cage match
