= Guerra del Golfo (2008) =

2008 International Wrestling Revolution Group event

- Promotion: International Wrestling Revolution Group
- Date: January 10, 2008
- City: Naucalpan, State of Mexico
- Venue: Arena Naucalpan

Event chronology
← Previous; IWRG 12th Anniversary Show	Next → Rey del Ring

Guerra del Golfo chronology
← Previous; 2005	Next → January 2009

The 2008 Guerra del Golfo (Spanish for "Gulf War") was a major professional wrestling event produced and scripted by the Mexican professional wrestling promotion International Wrestling Revolution Group ("IWRG"; sometimes referred to as Grupo Internacional Revolución in Mexico) on January 10, 2008. The 2008 version of the IWRG Guerra del Golfo was the second time overall IWRG used the name, and the beginning of it becoming an annual IWRG show.

The annual Guerra del Golfo main event consists of three matches in total, with two "qualifying matches", multi-man steel cage matches where the last person left in the cage advances to the main event of the night. The two losers would then be forced to wrestle inside the steel cage, with the loser of that match being forced to either take off their wrestling mask or have their hair shaved off under Lucha de Apuestas, or "bet match" rules, if they are unmasked. In the main event masked wrestler Oficial Fierro defeated Tortugillo Ninja I ("Ninja Turtle 1"), forcing him to unmask as a result. After the mask loss, he revealed that his birth name was Daniel Torres Ramírez. The show included three additional matches.

== Production ==
=== Background ===
Starting as far back as 1997, the Mexican wrestling promotion International Wrestling Revolution Group (IWRG; Sometimes referred to as Grupo Internacional Revolución in Spanish) has held several annual events where the main event was a multi-man steel cage match where the last wrestler left in the cage would be forced to either remove their wrestling mask or have their hair shaved off under Lucha de Apuestas, or "bet match", rules.

From 2005, IWRG has promoted a major show based on the steel cage match concept under the name Guerra del Golfo, or "Gulf War"—referring to the Gulf of Mexico, not the Gulf War in the Middle East. The Guerra del Golfo shows featured two "qualifying" steel cage matches, where the loser would later be forced to face off against each other in the main event of the show, a final cage match where the loser would be forced to either unmask or have his/her hair shaved off.

The use of the steel cage in three matches distinguishes the Guerra del Golfo event from other steel cage matches held throughout the year such as the IWRG El Castillo del Terror ("The Tower of Terror"), IWRG Guerra de Sexos ("War of the Sexes") or IWRG Prison Fatal ("Deadly Prison") shows. The Guerra del Golfo shows, as well as the majority of the IWRG shows in general, are held at Arena Naucalpan, owned by the promoters of IWRG and their main arena. The 2008 Guerra del Golfo was the second overall event to use the name and was the start of the show becoming an annual event for IWRG.

=== Storylines ===
The event featured seven professional wrestling matches with different wrestlers involved in pre-existing scripted feuds, plots and storylines. Wrestlers were portrayed as either heels (referred to as rudos in Mexico, those that portray the "bad guys") or faces (técnicos in Mexico, the "good guy" characters) as they followed a series of tension-building events, which culminated in a wrestling match or series of matches.

== Event ==
In the first steel cage match of the night Los Oficiales member Oficial Fierro was the last wrestler in the cage as Capitán Muerte, Multifacético, Bogeman, Puma King and Coco Verde all climbed over the top to the floor. In the second steel cage match of the night Tortugillo Ninja I lost to Oficial AK-47, Xibalva, Fantasma de la Ópera, Cocolores and Septiembre Negro II. The two wrestlers were then forced to wrestle inside the steel cage, both trying to defend their masks. In the end Oficial Fierro pinned Tortugillo Ninja I. After unmasking Tortugillo Ninja I revealed that his birth name was Daniel Torres Ramírez, brother of Consejo Mundial de Lucha Libre wrestlers Bengala, Artillero and Súper Comando.

== Aftermath ==
Los Tortugillos Ninja stopped working for IWRG on a regular basis shortly after Tortugillo Ninja I lost his mask in the Guerra del Golfo cage match, instead working on the Mexican independent circuit. Tortugillo Ninja I later changed his ring name to "Miguel Angel" while the other Tortugillos Ninja became known as Donatello and Leonardo. In 2015 the Tortugillo Ninjas returned to IWRG for a couple of matches, facing off against IWRG's latest "Ninja Turtle" creation, Los Tortugas Ninjas (Leo, Mike, Rafy and Teelo).

The Apuesta victory was one of the earliest successes of the Los Oficiales trio only months after the concept was introduced. Over the next couple of years Oficial Fierro, AK-47 and 911 would go on to win the Distrito Federal Trios Championship on two occasions, the IWRG Intercontinental Trios Championship on one occasion, and the IWRG Intercontinental Tag Team Championship. Over the years Oficial Fierro would win the hair of Freelance, before finally losing his mask to El Ángel at the 2012 El Castillo del Terror show ("The Tower of Terror") on November 1, 2012. The other Oficiales would eventually also be unmasked, Oficial AK-47 lost his mask to rival Oficial Factor on March 15, 2012 at the 2012 version of the Guerra del Golfo. Oficial 911 lost his mask to Golden Magic and El Hijo de Pirata Morgan in the main event of the Arena Naucalpan 36th Anniversary Show on December 19, 2013.

== Results ==
No.	Results	Stipulations
1	Comando Gama defeated Akuma	Best two-out-of-three-falls match
2	Halcón Salvaje and Tortuguillo Ninja II defeated Judas el Traidor and Rockero del Diablo	Best two-out-of-three-falls tag team match
3	Cyborg, El Hijo del Diablo and Némesis defeated Freelance and Los Gemelos Fantastico (Gemelo Fantastico I, Gemelo Fantastico II)	Best two-out-of-three falls six-man tag team match
4	El Hijo de Aníbal, Pantera and Veneno defeated Kai, Kaminari and Yamato	Best two-out-of-three falls six-man tag team match
5	Oficial Fierro lost to Capitán Muerte, Multifacético, Bogeman, Puma King and Coco Verde	La Guerra del Golfo semi-finals – five-man steel cage match
6	Tortugillo Ninja I lost to Oficial AK-47, Xibalva, Fantasma de la Ópera, Cocolores and Septiembre Negro II	La Guerra del Golfo semi-finals – six-man steel cage match
7	Oficial Fierro defeated Tortugillo Ninja I	La Guerra del Golfo finals – steel cage, Luchas de Apuestas, hair vs. hair match
