= Guerra del Golfo (2019) =

2019 International Wrestling Revolution Group event

- Official poster showing all steel cage match participants
- Date: April 7, 2019
- City: Naucalpan, State of Mexico
- Venue: Arena Naucalpan

Event chronology
← Previous; Máscara vs. Cabellera	Next → —

IWRG Guerra del Golfo chronology
← Previous; 2018	Next → —

The Guerra del Golfo (2019) (Spanish for "Gulf War") was a professional wrestling supercard show produced and scripted by the Mexican professional wrestling promotion International Wrestling Revolution Group (IWRG) that took place on April 7, 2019. The show was the 12th year in a row that IWRG has held a Guerra del Golfo show, which usually takes places in the early spring, around March or April.

The eponymous Guerra del Golfo tournament consists of three matches in total, with two "qualifying matches", multi-man steel cage matches where the last person left in the cage is "punished" by advancing to the main event of the night. The two losers were then forced to wrestle inside the steel cage under Lucha de Apuestas, or "bet match", rules. For the 2019 Guerra del Golfo Tortuga Mike and Metaleón lost their respective cage matches and were forced to fight each other. In the end, Mike lost and was forced to unmask and reveal his given name, Hector Eduardo Martinez Sanchez, to the audience. The show featured four additional matches, including Cerebro Negro successfully defending the IWRG Intercontinental Welterweight Championship against Demonio Infernal.

== Production ==
=== Background ===
The Mexican wrestling promotion International Wrestling Revolution Group (IWRG; Sometimes referred to as Grupo Internacional Revolución in Spanish) has a long-standing history of holding major event focused on a multi-man steel cage match where the last wrestler left in the cage would be forced to either remove their wrestling mask or have their hair shaved off under Lucha de Apuestas, or "bet match", rules. In 2005 IWRG created a specific spring-time show promoting the steel cage match concept under the name Guerra del Golfo, or "Gulf War", referring to the Gulf of Mexico (not the Gulf War in the middle east). The Guerra del Golfo shows featured two "qualifying" multi-man steel cage matches where the loser would later be forced to face off against each other in the main event of the show. In the final cage match the two wrestlers would wrestle where the loser would be forced to either unmask or, if they are not wearing a mask, have his hair shaved off. The use of the steel cage in three matches distinguishes the Guerra del Golfo event from other Steel cage matches held throughout the year such as the IWRG El Castillo del Terror'("The Tower of Terror"), IWRG Guerra de Sexos ("War of the Sexes"), or IWRG Prison Fatal ("Deadly Prison") shows.

The first two Guerra del Golfo steel cage matches are contested under elimination match rules, which means wrestlers escape the cage by climbing over the top of the steel cage to the floor. The last wrestler in the cage will be put in the final match of the night. Unlike the first two steel cage matches the final match is normally contested under pinfall rules.

The Guerra del Golfo shows, as well as the majority of the IWRG shows in general, are held in "Arena Naucalpan", owned by the promoters of IWRG and is their home arena, with the group rarely venturing outside of Naucalpan. The 2016 Guerra del Golfo show was the tenth IWRG promoted a show under that name, and the ninth year in a row since becoming an annual event from 2008 forwardand the eleventh Guerra del Golfo show owing to IWRG holding two events in 2009. Prior to the 2019 event five wrestlers had lost their masks; Ultra Mega, Tortuguillo Ninja I, Destroyer, Astro, and Tortuga Teelo, while seven wrestlers were shaved bald; Cerebro Negro, Arlequín Rojo, Chico Che (twice), Oficial AK-47 (twice), and Danny Casas.

=== Storylines ===
The event featured seven professional wrestling matches with different wrestlers involved in pre-existing scripted feuds, plots and storylines. Wrestlers were portrayed as either heels (referred to as rudos in Mexico, those that portray the "bad guys") or faces (técnicos in Mexico, the "good guy" characters) as they followed a series of tension-building events, which culminated in a wrestling match or series of matches.

== Event ==
In the opening match, Puma de Oro defeated Guerrero 2000 by pinfall in a match that was not taped for television. Maquina Infernal was originally advertised for the second match of the night, but was replaced and instead Mexica and Saurman defeated the Neza Kid and Toto two falls to one.

The third match of the night saw the rudo trio of Eterno, Lunatic Xtreme, and Último Maldito defeated the trio of Arkángel Divino, Dinamic Black, Eragón in a match that was so liked by the fans that they threw money in the ring, a lucha libre tradition for really good matches. The fourth match of the night saw Cerebro Negro successfully defend the IWRG Intercontinental Welterweight Championship, this time against Demonio Infernal. Cerebro Negro won two falls to one, in another match that saw fans throw money in the ring.

Both of the initial steel cage matches were contested under "escape rules", where the last person in the cage would be deemed the loser of the match. Oficial Rayan was originally announced for the match, but Capo del Norte replaced him without any official explanation. In the end Metaleón was left in the cage after Black Danger, Súper Nova, Multifacético, Manchas, Capo del Norte, Golden Magic, and Imposible all climbed up the side of the cage and over the top. In the second cage match Tortuga Mike lost the cage match to El Hijo de Huracán Ramírez, Séptimo Rayo, Mosca, El Hijo del Alebrije, El Hijo del Medico Asesino, Death Metal, and Diablo Jr. The third and final steel cage match saw Metaleón pin Tortuga Mike, making him the second Tortuga Ninja to lose his mask at a Guerra del Golfo, as Tortuga Teelo has lost his mask at the 2018 event. After the match Tortuga Mike unmasked and revealed that his real name was Hector Eduardo Martinez Sanchez, that he was 25 years old at the time of the show, and had been a wrestler for 6 years.

== Results ==
No.	Results	Stipulations
1	Puma de Oro defeated Guerrero 2000	Best two-out-of-three-falls match
2	Mexica and Saruman defeated Neza Kid and Toto	Best two-out-of-three falls tag team match
3	Eterno, Lunatic Xtreme, and Último Maldito defeated Arkángel Divino, Dinamic Black, and Eragón	Best two-out-of-three falls six-man "Lucha Libre rules" tag team match
4	Cerebro Negro (c) defeated Demonio Infernal	Best two-out-of-three falls match for the IWRG Intercontinental Welterweight Championship
5	Metaleón lost: Also in the match: Black Danger, Súper Nova, Multifacético 2.0, Manchas, Capo del Norte, Golden Magic, and Imposible	Guerra del Golfo steel cage match
6	Tortuga Mike lost: Also in the match: El Hijo de Huracán Ramírez, Séptimo Rayo, Mosca, El Hijo del Alebrije, El Hijo del Medico Asesino, Death Metal, and Diablo Jr.	Guerra del Golfo steel cage match
7	Metaleón defeated Tortuga Mike	Guerra del Golfo steel cage Lucha de Apuestas, mask vs. mask match
(c) / – the champion(s) heading into the match
