= Guerra del Golfo (2013) =

2013 International Wrestling Revolution Group event

- Official poster promoting the participants of the two steel cage matches.
- Promotion: International Wrestling Revolution Group
- Date: April 18, 2013
- City: Naucalpan, State of Mexico
- Venue: Arena Naucalpan
- Tagline(s): 3 Luchas en Jaula de mascaras y cabelleras "3 cage matches for masks and hair"

Event chronology
← Previous; Guerra de Familias	Next → Rebelión de los Juniors

Guerra del Golfo chronology
← Previous; 2012	Next → 2014

Guerra del Golfo (2013) (Spanish for "Gulf War") was a professional wrestling major event produced by Mexican professional wrestling promotion International Wrestling Revolution Group (IWRG), which took place on April 18, 2013, in Arena Naucalpan, Naucalpan, State of Mexico, Mexico. The annual Guerra del Golfo main event consists of three matches in total, with two "qualifying matches", multi-man steel cage matches where the last person left in the cage advances to the main event of the night. The two losers is forced to wrestle inside the steel cage, with the loser being forced to either take off their wrestling mask or have their hair shaved off under Lucha de Apuesta, or "Bet match" rules.

== Production ==
=== Background ===
Starting as far back as at least 2000, the Mexican wrestling promotion International Wrestling Revolution Group (IWRG; Sometimes referred to as Grupo Internacional Revolución in Spanish) has held several annual events where the main event was a multi-man steel cage match where the last wrestler left in the cage would be forced to either remove their wrestling mask or have their hair shaved off under Lucha de Apuestas, or "bet match", rules. From 2005 IWRG has promoted a spring time show promoting the steel cage match concept under the name Guerra del Golfo, or "Gulf War", referring to the Gulf of Mexico, not the Gulf War in the middle east. The Gurerra del Golfo shows featured two "qualifying" steel cage matches where the loser would later be forced to face off against each other in the main event of the show, a final cage match where the loser would be forced to either unmask or have his/her hair shaved off. The use of the steel cage in three matches distinguishes the Guerra del Golfo event from other Steel cage matches held throughout the year such as the IWRG El Castillo del Terror ("The Tower of Terror"), IWRG Guerra de Sexos ("War of the Sexes") or IWRG Prison Fatal ("Deadly Prison") shows. The Guerra del Golfo shows, as well as the majority of the IWRG shows in general, are held in "Arena Naucalpan", owned by the promoters of IWRG and their main arena. The 2013 Castillo del Terror show was the seventh year IWRG promoted a show under that name and the sixth year in a row since becoming an annual event from 2008 forward.

=== Storylines ===
The event featured five professional wrestling matches with different wrestlers involved in pre-existing scripted feuds, plots and storylines. Wrestlers were portrayed as either heels (referred to as rudos in Mexico, those that portray the "bad guys") or faces (técnicos in Mexico, the "good guy" characters) as they followed a series of tension-building events, which culminated in a wrestling match or series of matches. The Main Event was a 12-Man Steel Cage Match. The last two wrestlers who remained in the ring fought one on one in a Lucha de Apuestas Match ("Bet match"), wagering their mask on the outcome of the match. The event included wrestlers from International Wrestling Revolution Group (IWRG) as well as a number of Mexican freelance wrestlers.

IWRG announced 16 participants for the annual Guerra del Golfo ("Gulf War", referring to the Gulf of Mexico, not the middle eastern wars.) on April 14, 2018. IWRG regulars El Ángel, Carta Brava, Jr., Danny Casas, Chico Che, Dinamic Black, Apolo Estrada, Jr., Eterno, Factor, Mosco X-Fly, Oficial 911, Trauma I, Trauma II and Veneno were all included in the match. The Guerro del Golfo event would also include Dragon Gate trainees Eita and Tomahawk and lone AAA representative Toscano rounded out the match. In the annual Guerra del Golfo wrestlers face off in Steel cage matches with the loser of the first two steel cage matches being forced to fight each other in the final match of the night. The losing wrestler in the final would be forced to either unmask (if masked) or have their hair shaved off (if not masked) under the Lucha libre rules of a Lucha de Apuesta, or "Bet match". Carta Brava, Jr., Dinamic Black, Trauma I and Trauma II were all masked going into the match while the other 12 competitors were putting their hair on the line. The first "loser advances" steel cage match would include Toscano, Mosco X-Fly, Oficial 911, El Ángel, Veneno, Apolo Estrada, Jr., Tomahawk and Trauma II, while the second "loser advances" match included Factor, Carta Brava, Jr., Chico Che, Eterno, Dinamic Black, Eita, Trauma I and Danny Casas. The first two cage matches would be contested under "escape" rules, which meant that a wrestler would be eliminated when that person was able to climb up the cage and put at least one leg over the top. The last person in the ring would be deemed the loser and would have to compete in a match where pinfalls and submissions would also win the match. In past IWRG steel cage matches under similar stipulations wrestlers not officially announced in the match have interfered, climbed in the cage to help someone or attack someone. This interference made the unannounced wrestlers eligible for the "loser advances" stipulation as well. The most blatant case of this scenario came at the 2012 Guerra del Golfo event where the final match turned from a one on one match to a three on three match involving all three members of Los Oficiales and all three members of Los Oficiales Elite who were involved in a long running storyline at the time.

== Event ==
IWRG replaced Picudo, Jr. and Spartan with Eita and Tomahawk in the second match. Tomahawak was removed from the Steel Cage Match by Spartan while Eita worked two matches on the same show.

=== Results ===
No.	Results	Stipulations
1	Galaxy and Mr. Leo defeated Fulgor and Power Bull	Best two-out-of-three falls tag team match
2	Eita, Tomahawk and Rayan defeated Centvrión, Golden Magic and Saruman	Best two-out-of-three falls six-person tag team match
3	El Ángel, Mosco X-Fly, Oficial 911, Spartan, Toscano, Trauma II and Veneno defeated Apolo Estrada, Jr.	Eight-man "Loser advances" steel cage match
4	Carta Brava, Jr., Danny Casas, Dinamic Black, Eterno, Eita, Factor and Trauma I defeated Chico Che	Eight-man "Loser advances" steel cage match
5	Apolo Estrada, Jr. defeated Chico Che	Lucha de Apuesta, hair vs. hair steel cage match
