= Guerra del Golfo (September 2009) =

2009 International Wrestling Revolution Group event

- Official poster showing 10 of the main event competitors.
- Promotion: International Wrestling Revolution Group
- Date: September 16, 2009
- City: Naucalpan, State of Mexico
- Venue: Arena Naucalpan

Event chronology
← Previous; 35 Años de Scorpio Jr.	Next → El Gran Desafío Femenil – Sin Empate, Sin Indulto

Guerra del Golfo chronology
← Previous; January 2009	Next → 2010

Guerra del Golfo (September 2009) (Spanish for "Gulf War") was a major annual professional wrestling event produced by Mexican professional wrestling promotion International Wrestling Revolution Group (IWRG), which took place on September 16, 2009 in Arena Naucalpan, Naucalpan, State of Mexico, Mexico. The annual Guerra del Golfo main event consists of three matches in total, with two "qualifying matches", multi-man steel cage matches where the last person left in the cage advances to the main event of the night. The two losers would then be forced to wrestle inside the steel cage, with the loser of that match being forced to either take off their wrestling mask or have their hair shaved off under Lucha de Apuestas, or "Bet match" rules, if they are unmasked.

== Production ==
=== Background ===
Starting as far back as at least 2000, the Mexican wrestling promotion International Wrestling Revolution Group (IWRG; Sometimes referred to as Grupo Internacional Revolución in Spanish) has held several annual events where the main event was a multi-man steel cage match where the last wrestler left in the cage would be forced to either remove their wrestling mask or have their hair shaved off under Lucha de Apuestas, or "bet match", rules. From 2005 IWRG has promoted a spring time show promoting the steel cage match concept under the name Guerra del Golfo, or "Gulf War", referring to the Gulf of Mexico, not the Gulf War in the middle east. The Gurerra del Golfo shows featured two "qualifying" steel cage matches where the loser would later be forced to face off against each other in the main event of the show, a final cage match where the loser would be forced to either unmask or have his/her hair shaved off. The use of the steel cage in three matches distinguishes the Guerra del Golfo event from other Steel cage matches held throughout the year such as the IWRG El Castillo del Terror ("The Tower of Terror"), IWRG Guerra de Sexos ("War of the Sexes") or IWRG Prison Fatal ("Deadly Prison") shows. The Guerra del Golfo shows, as well as the majority of the IWRG shows in general, are held in "Arena Naucalpan", owned by the promoters of IWRG and their main arena. The September 2009 Guerra del Golfo show was the third year IWRG promoted a show under that name and the second year in a row since becoming an annual event from 2008 forward. 2009 was the only year to date where IWRG held two Guerra del Golfo shows in a year, having previously held a Guerro del Golfo show in January 2009.

=== Storylines ===
The event featured six professional wrestling matches with different wrestlers involved in pre-existing scripted feuds, plots and storylines. Wrestlers were portrayed as either heels (referred to as rudos in Mexico, those that portray the "bad guys") or faces (técnicos in Mexico, the "good guy" characters) as they followed a series of tension-building events, which culminated in a wrestling match or series of matches.

== Aftermath ==
As a result of the main event Arlequín Rojo was forced to unmask and reveal his real name, Victor Manuel Montés, per Lucha Libre traditions. Following Arlequín Rojo unmasking in the main event Arlequín Amarillo issued a challenge to Rigo and Chico Che to a tag team Luchas de Apuestas where both teams would risk their hair. The following week Rigo and Chico Che defeated Los Arlequíns, forcing both Rojo and Amarillo to have their hair shaved off as a result. The duo would only wrestle sporadically for IWRG after the hair loss. In the mid-2011 the group Los Oficiales introduced a new member called Oficial Spartans, later shortened to just Oficial Spartan, who was played by Montés and was brought in to replace the injured Oficial AK-47. In late 2014 the former Los Arlequíns partners were reunited as IWRG hired Arlequín Amarillo to play the part of "Oficial Spector", teaming with Oficial Spartan, Oficial Rayan and Oficial Liderk.

== Results ==
No.	Results	Stipulations
1	Eragon and Star Boy defeated El Hijo del Signo and Talisman Jr.	Best two-out-of-three falls tag team match
2	Exodia and Pendulo defeated Gringo Loco and Hombre Bala Jr.	Best two-out-of-three falls tag team match
3	Arlequín Rojo lost to Oficial AK-47, Capitan Muerte, Oficial Fierro, Tetsuya Bushi and Yack	La Guerra del Golfo semi-finals - eight-man steel cage match
4	Rigo lost to Oficial 911, Arlequín Amarillo, Bobby Lee Jr., Pirata Morgan and Toxico	La Guerra del Golfo semi-finals - eight-man steel cage match
5	Rigo defeated Arlequín Rojo	La Guerra del Golfo finals - steel cage, Luchas de Apuestas, hair vs. hair match

Guerra del Golfo Cage match A order of escape

1. Yack
2. Oficial AK-47
3. Capitan Muerte
4. Tetsuya Bushi
5. Oficial Fierro

Guerra del Golfo Cage match B order of escape

1. Arlequin Amarillo
2. Toxico
3. Bobby Lee Jr.
4. Pirata Morgan
5. Oficial 911
