= Guerra del Golfo (2014) =

2014 International Wrestling Revolution Group event

- Official poster showing 12 of the 14 wrestlers participating in the Guera del Golfo
- Promotion: International Wrestling Revolution Group
- Date: March 16, 2014
- City: Naucalpan, State of Mexico
- Venue: Arena Naucalpan
- Tagline(s): 3 Lucha en el Jaula (Three Steel Cage matches)

Event chronology
← Previous; Rebelión de los Juniors	Next → Rey del Ring

Guerra del Golfo chronology
← Previous; 2013	Next → 2015

Guerra del Golfo (2014) (Spanish for "Gulf War") was the 2014 installment of an annual professional wrestling major event produced by Mexican professional wrestling promotion International Wrestling Revolution Group (IWRG), which took place on March 16, 2014, in Arena Naucalpan, Naucalpan, State of Mexico, Mexico. The annual Guerra del Golfo main event consists of three matches in total, with two "qualifying matches", multi-man steel cage matches where the last person left in the cage advances to the main event of the night. The two losers is forced to wrestle inside the steel cage, with the loser being forced to either take off their wrestling mask or have their hair shaved off under Lucha de Apuesta, or "Bet match" rules.

== Production ==
=== Background ===
Starting as far back as at least 2000, the Mexican wrestling promotion International Wrestling Revolution Group (IWRG; Sometimes referred to as Grupo Internacional Revolución in Spanish) has held several annual events where the main event was a multi-man steel cage match where the last wrestler left in the cage would be forced to either remove their wrestling mask or have their hair shaved off under Lucha de Apuestas, or "bet match", rules. From 2005 IWRG has promoted a spring time show promoting the steel cage match concept under the name Guerra del Golfo, or "Gulf War", referring to the Gulf of Mexico, not the Gulf War in the middle east. The Gurerra del Golfo shows featured two "qualifying" steel cage matches where the loser would later be forced to face off against each other in the main event of the show, a final cage match where the loser would be forced to either unmask or have his/her hair shaved off. The use of the steel cage in three matches distinguishes the Guerra del Golfo event from other Steel cage matches held throughout the year such as the IWRG El Castillo del Terror ("The Tower of Terror"), IWRG Guerra de Sexos ("War of the Sexes") or IWRG Prison Fatal ("Deadly Prison") shows. The Guerra del Golfo shows, as well as the majority of the IWRG shows in general, are held in "Arena Naucalpan", owned by the promoters of IWRG and their main arena. The 2014 Castillo del Terror show was the eight year IWRG promoted a show under that name and the seventh year in a row since becoming an annual event from 2008 forward.

=== Storylines ===
The event featured six professional wrestling matches with different wrestlers involved in pre-existing scripted feuds, plots and storylines. Wrestlers were portrayed as either heels (referred to as rudos in Mexico, those that portray the "bad guys") or faces (técnicos in Mexico, the "good guy" characters) as they followed a series of tension-building events, which culminated in a wrestling match or series of matches. The Main Event was a 12-Man Steel Cage Match. The last two wrestlers who remained in the ring fought one on one in a Lucha de Apuestas Match ("Bet match"), wagering their mask on the outcome of the match. The event included wrestlers from International Wrestling Revolution Group (IWRG) as well as a number of Mexican freelance wrestlers.

== Results ==
No.	Results	Stipulations
1	Hip Hop Man and Latigo defeated Aztlan and Daisuke Hanaoka – two falls to one	Best two-out-of-three falls tag team match
2	Chico Che, Emperador Azteca and La Magnifica defeated Imposible and Los Japones del Mal (Daisuke Hanaoka and Douki) – two falls to one	Best two-out-of-three falls six-person tag team match
3	Super Nova (C) defeated Trauma II – two falls to one	Best two-out-of-three falls match for the IWRG Junior de Juniors Championship
4	Tony Rivera lost to El Hijo del Diablo, Golden Magic, Toscano, Trauma I and Veneno	Six-man "Loser advances" steel cage match
5	Oficial AK-47 lost to Apolo Estrada, Jr., Black Terry, El Hijo de Máscara Año 2000, Relámpago and Skayde	Six-man "Loser advances" steel cage match
6	Tony Rivera defeated Oficial AK-47	Lucha de Apuesta, hair vs. hair steel cage match

Steel Cage A order of escape

1. Trauma I
2. Toscano
3. Golden Magic
4. El Hijo del Diablo
5. Black Terry
6. Veneno

Steel Cage B order of escape

1. Skayde
2. Apolo Dantes, Jr.
3. El Hijo de Máscara Año 2000
4. Relámpago
5. Black Terry
