= Guerra del Golfo (2005) =

2005 International Wrestling Revolution Group event

- Promotion: International Wrestling Revolution Group
- Date: December 22, 2005
- City: Naucalpan, State of Mexico
- Venue: Arena Naucalpan

Event chronology
← Previous; Rey del Ring	Next → IWRG 10th Anniversary Show

Guerra del Golfo chronology
← Previous; First	Next → 2008

Arena Naucalpan Anniversary Shows chronology
← Previous; 27th Anniversary	Next → 29th Anniversary

The 2005 Guerra del Golfo (Spanish for "Gulf War") was the first instance of the recurring IWRG Guerra del Golfo major event produced and scripted by the Mexican professional wrestling promotion International Wrestling Revolution Group ("IWRG"; sometimes referred to as Grupo Internacional Revolución in Mexico). The show, held on December 22, 2005 also commemorated the 28th Anniversary of Arena Naucalpan, IWRG's main venue. In this instance the "Gulf" referred to in the title is the Gulf of Mexico, not the Gulf War in the Persian Gulf.

The annual Guerra del Golfo main event consists of three matches in total, with two "qualifying matches", multi-man steel cage matches where the last person left in the cage advances to the main event of the night. The two losers would then be forced to wrestle inside the steel cage, with the loser of that match being forced to either take off their wrestling mask or have their hair shaved off under Lucha de Apuestas, or "bet match" rules, if they are unmasked. In the main event masked wrestler Nemesis defeated Ultra Mega, forcing him to unmask as a result. The undercard also saw Scorpio Jr. defeat Heavy Metal to win the IWRG Intercontinental Heavyweight Championship for the third time.

== Production ==
=== Background ===
Starting as far back as 1997, the Mexican wrestling promotion International Wrestling Revolution Group (IWRG; sometimes referred to as Grupo Internacional Revolución in Spanish) has held several annual events where the main event was a multi-man steel cage match where the last wrestler left in the cage would be forced to either remove their wrestling mask or have their hair shaved off under Lucha de Apuestas, or "bet match", rules. From 2005 IWRG has promoted a major show based on the steel cage match concept under the name Guerra del Golfo, or "Gulf War", referring to the Gulf of Mexico, not the Gulf War in the Persian Gulf. The Gurerra del Golfo shows featured two "qualifying" steel cage matches where the loser would later be forced to face off against each other in the main event of the show, a final cage match where the loser would be forced to either unmask or have his/her hair shaved off. The use of the steel cage in three matches distinguishes the Guerra del Golfo event from other steel cage matches held throughout the year such as the IWRG El Castillo del Terror ("The Tower of Terror"), IWRG Guerra de Sexos ("War of the Sexes") or IWRG Prison Fatal ("Deadly Prison") shows. The Guerra del Golfo shows, as well as the majority of the IWRG shows in general, are held in Arena Naucalpan, owned by the promoters of IWRG and their main arena.

Arena Naucalpan opened its doors for the first lucha libre show on December 17, 1977. From that point on the arena hosted regular weekly shows for Promociones Moreno and hosted Universal Wrestling Association (UWA) on a regular basis and later on Consejo Mundial de Lucha Libre. Each year since its opening promoter and owner Adolfo Moreno has held an Arena Naucalpan anniversary show. In late 1995 Moreno decided to create his own promotion, creating a regular roster instead of relying totally on wrestlers from other promotions, creating the International Wrestling Revolution Group on January 1, 1996. From that point on Arena Naucalpan became the main venue for IWRG, hosting the majority of their weekly shows and all of their major shows as well.

=== Storylines ===
The event featured six professional wrestling matches with different wrestlers involved in pre-existing scripted feuds, plots, and storylines. Wrestlers were portrayed as either heels (referred to as rudos in Mexico, those that portray the "bad guys") or faces (técnicos in Mexico, the "good guy" characters) as they followed a series of tension-building events, which culminated in a wrestling match or series of matches.

== Event ==
The outcome of the first two matches, a singles match between Panterita and Zaiyer, and a best two-out-of-three falls six-man tag team match between the team of Cerebro Negro, Dr. Cerebro, and Veneno and the team of Kaleth, Pirata Morgan Jr., and Shigeo Okumura have not been documented.

Scorpio Jr. had worked for IWRG since its creation, initially due to their working agreement with Consejo Mundial de Lucha Libre (CMLL) and later on Scorpio Jr. signed directly with IWRG. Over the years he had won the IWRG Intercontinental Heavyweight Championship on three occasions, the first time being on December 16, 1999. His third reign began on September 9, 2004 as he defeated Villano IV to win the championship. His reign lasted a total of 245 days, until May 12, 2005 where he lost the belt to Heavy Metal.

== Aftermath ==
Fernando Montes wrestled as Ultra Mega for a while after being unmasked, but disappeared from IWRG in 2006. In 2007 he returned as the masked character "Oficial Fierro", teaming up with Oficial 911 and Oficial AK-47 to form the latest version of Los Oficiales in early 2007. Teaming with Oficial 911 and Oficial AK-47 Montes, as Oficial Fierro, won the Distrito Federal Trios Championship twice and the IWRG Intercontinental Trios Championship once.

Nemesis, along with his regular Jinetes de Apocalipsis ("Horsemen of the Apocalypse") tag team partners Kaleth and Pirata Morgan Jr., left IWRG in 2008 and changed his name to "El Hijo de Pirata Morgan" ("The Son of Pirata Morgan"). Being born in 1992 Nemesis was supposedly 13 years old at the time of the 2005 Guerra del Golfo, which makes it possible that someone else played the part of Nemesis early on and the future El Hijo de Pirata Morgan took over the role later on, but there are also examples of teenagers as young as 13 wrestling in Mexico.

Scorpio Jr.'s fourth reign ended when the IWRG Intercontinental Heavyweight Championship was vacated in February 2006 as Scorpio Jr. stopped working for IWRG on a regular basis. On May 5, 2006 El Canek won the championship, starting a reign that would last 1,444 days, almost four years.

== Results ==
No.	Results	Stipulations
1	Panterita vs. Zaiyer ended in an unknown manner	Best two-out-of-three-falls match
2	Cerebro Negro, Dr. Cerebro and Veneno vs. Kaleth, Pirata Morgan Jr. and Shigeo Okumura ended in an unknown manner	Best two-out-of-three falls six-man tag team match
3	Scorpio Jr. defeated Heavy Metal (c)	Best two-out-of-three-falls match for the IWRG Intercontinental Heavyweight Championship
4	Ultra Mega lost to El Felino, Mephisto, Pierroth II and Stuka Jr.	La Guerra del Golfo semi-finals - five-man steel cage match
5	Nemesis lost to El Pantera, El Sagrado, Matrix and Nitro	La Guerra del Golfo semi-finals - five-man steel cage match
6	Nemesis defeated Ultra Mega	La Guerra del Golfo finals - steel cage, Luchas de Apuestas, hair vs. hair match
(c) / – the champion(s) heading into the match
