= Pasión Kristal =

Mexican wrestler (1976–2021)

Personal information
- Born: José Gabriel Zentella Damián; 9 January 1976 Villahermosa, Tabasco, Mexico
- Died: 2 June 2021 (aged 45) Acapulco, Guerrero, Mexico
- Cause of death: Drowning

Professional wrestling career
- Ring name(s): Némesis 2000; Orquídea Salem; Pasión Kristal; Pasión Crystal
- Billed height: 175 cm (69 in)
- Billed weight: 78 kg (172 lb)
- Trained by: El Torbellino; Rayo Vengador
- Debut: 3 May 1994

José Gabriel Zentella Damián, best known by the pseudonyms Pasión Kristal or Pasión Crystal (9 January 1976 – 2 June 2021), was a Mexican professional wrestler.

== Biography ==
Kristal was born in Villahermosa, Tabasco. He appeared as an exótico, a form of drag queen, and made his professional wrestling debut in 1994. Kristal wrestled in Asistencia Asesoría y Administración (now Lucha Libre AAA Worldwide), Mexico's largest association, between 2008 and 2013, and for a short time in 2019. Throughout the 2010s and early 2020s, Kristal was a big name in the Mexican independent wrestling scene. Along with Diva Salvaje and Jessy Ventura, he formed the trio Las Shotas which achieved great success in Grupo Internacional Revolución (IWRG), the third-largest wrestling federation in Mexico.

On 2 June 2021, Kristal disappeared after visiting a beach in Acapulco, Guerrero, before attending a wrestling event in the city that night. Kristal was swept away by a wave while on the beach with Salvaje and Ventura, and it was suspected that he drowned in the area. A day later, at about 9:00 AM, he was found dead on the beach. He was aged 45.

== Personal life ==
Zentella's father abandoned his family when Kristal was 8 years old. Zentella knew that he was gay from the age of 12. He experienced prejudice from his family and the wrestling industry.
