= IWRG Guerra del Golfo =

International Wrestling Revolution Group event series

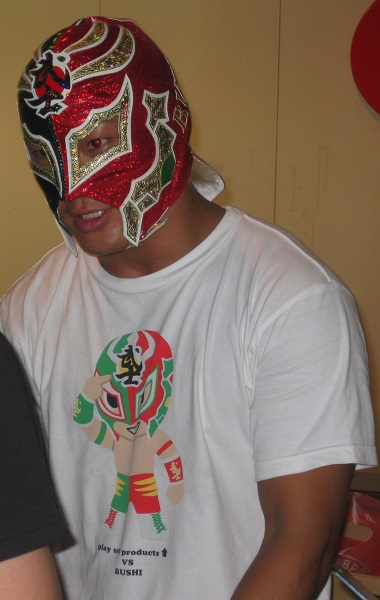
Tetsuya Bushi, risked his mask twice in La Guerra del Golfo tournaments.

Guerra del Golfo (Spanish for "Gulf War") is both the name of a major show series promoted by the Mexican Lucha Libre, or professional wrestling promotion International Wrestling Revolution Group (IWRG) as well as the name of the tournament match that is the focal point of the show. The tournament consists of two first-round steel cage matches where the last person in the cage advances to the final match of the night. In the finals the two losers face off in a cage match where the loser of that match is either unmasked or forced to have their hair shaved off under Luchas de Apuestas rules. There have been a total of 10 shows since the first show in 2005. So far three wrestlers have lost their masks and seven have been shaved bald.

== Event history ==
Starting as far back as at least 2000, the Mexican wrestling promotion International Wrestling Revolution Group (IWRG; Sometimes referred to as Grupo Internacional Revolución in Spanish) has held several annual events where the main event was a multi-man steel cage match where the last wrestler left in the cage would be forced to either remove their wrestling mask or have their hair shaved off under Luchas de Apuestas, or "bet match", rules. From 2005 IWRG has promoted a spring time show promoting the steel cage match concept under the name Guerra del Golfo, or "Gulf War", referring to the Gulf of Mexico, not the Gulf War in the middle east. The Gurerra del Golfo shows always featured two "qualifying" steel cage matches where the loser would later be forced to face off against each other in the main event of the show, a final cage match where the loser would be forced to either unmask or have his/her hair shaved off. The use of the steel cage in three matches distinguishes the Guerra del Golfo event from other Steel cage matches held throughout the year such as the IWRG El Castillo del Terror ("The Tower of Terror"), IWRG Guerra de Sexos ("War of the Sexes") or IWRG Prison Fatal ("Deadly Prison") shows. The Guerra del Golfo shows, as well as the majority of the IWRG shows in general, are held in "Arena Naucalpan", owned by the promoters of IWRG and their main arena. Starting in 2008 IWRG has held at least one Guerra del Golfo match each year, with the 2015 edition being the tenth over all show.

A total of 69 wrestlers have participated in one or more Guerra del Golfo cage matches including two women, Ludark Shartain and Sexy Lady. Oficial AK-47 and Veneno are tied for the most tournaments, six each. No one has won the Guerra del Golfo twice, but Chicho Che has been on the losing side twice, losing his hair in both 2010 and 2013. Ultra Mega was the first to lose his mask in the Guerra del Golfo match and later participated in several additional matches under the name Oficial Fierro, including winning the 2008 tournament. Guillermo Martinez Ci has worked the Guerra del Golfo tournament under three different ring names; Bombero Infernal, Capitán Muerte and Matrix. The winner of the first tournament, Némesis, later became better known as El Hijo del Pirata Morgan and Arlequín Rojo would later return as Oficial Spartan. The finals of 2008, set to be Oficial 911 against Oficial Factor, but during the match Oficial AK-47, Oficial Fierro, Oficial Spartan and Oficial Rayan climbed in the cage and became official participants. In the end Oficial AK-47 lost the match even though he was not originally a finalist.

== Guerra del Golfo winners ==
Year	Winner	Loser	Wager	Reference
2005	Némesis	Ultra Mega	Mask	
2008	Oficial Fierro	Tortuguillo Ninja I	Mask	
January 2009	Dr. Cerebro	Cerebro Negro	Hair	
September 2009	Rigo	Arlequín Rojo	Hair	
2010	El Hijo del Diablo	Chico Che	Hair	
2011	Multifacético	Destroyer	Mask	
2012	Oficial Factor	Oficial AK-47	Hair	
2013	Apolo Estrada Jr.	Chico Che	Hair	
2014	Tony Rivera	Oficial AK-47	Hair	
2015	X-Fly	Danny Casas	Hair	
2016	Dr. Cerebro	Astro	Mask	
2017	Máscara Año 2000 Jr.	Freelance	Hair	
2018	Tortuga Mike	Tortuga Teelo	Mask	

== Dates, venues, and main events ==
Event	Date	City	Venue	Main event	Ref(s)
2005	December 22, 2005	Naucalpan, Mexico State	Arena Naucalpan	Némesis vs. Ultra Mega	
2008	January 10, 2008	Naucalpan, Mexico State	Arena Naucalpan	Oficial Fierro vs Tortuguillo Ninja I	
January 2009	January 1, 2009	Naucalpan, Mexico State	Arena Naucalpan	Dr. Cerebro vs. Cerebro Negro	
September 2009	September 16, 2009	Naucalpan, Mexico State	Arena Naucalpan	Arlequín Rojo vs. Rigo	
2010	February 28, 2010	Naucalpan, Mexico State	Arena Naucalpan	El Hijo del Diablo vs. Chico Che	
2011	April 3, 2011	Naucalpan, Mexico State	Arena Naucalpan	Multifacético vs Destroyer	
2012	April 15, 2012	Naucalpan, Mexico State	Arena Naucalpan	Oficial AK-47 vs. Oficial 911 vs. Oficial Factor vs. Oficial Fierro vs. Oficial Rayan vs Oficial Spartan	
2013	April 18, 2013	Naucalpan, Mexico State	Arena Naucalpan	Apolo Estrada Jr. vs. Chico Che	
2014	March 16, 2014	Naucalpan, Mexico State	Arena Naucalpan	Tony Rivera vs. Oficial AK-47	
2015	March 15, 2015	Naucalpan, Mexico State	Arena Naucalpan	X-Fly vs. Danny Casas	
2016	April 17, 2016	Naucalpan, Mexico State	Arena Naucalpan	Dr. Cerebro vs. Astro	
2017	April 16, 2017	Naucalpan, Mexico State	Arena Naucalpan	Máscara Año 2000 Jr. vs. Veneno vs. Freelance	
2018	April 17, 2016	Naucalpan, Mexico State	Arena Naucalpan	Tortuga Mike vs. Tortuga Teelo	
