= Guerra del Golfo (2010) =

2010 International Wrestling Revolution Group event

- Official poster depicting all the cage match competitors
- Promotion: International Wrestling Revolution Group
- Date: February 28, 2010
- City: Naucalpan, State of Mexico
- Venue: Arena Naucalpan

Event chronology
← Previous; IWRG 13th Anniversary Show	Next → El Gran Desafío

Guerra del Golfo chronology
← Previous; September 2009	Next → 2011

Guerra del Golfo (2010) (Spanish for "Gulf War") was an annual professional wrestling major event produced by Mexican professional wrestling promotion International Wrestling Revolution Group (IWRG), which took place on February 28, 2010, in Arena Naucalpan, Naucalpan, State of Mexico, Mexico. It was the fourth time IWRG had held a Guerra del Golfo event since 2002, making it an annual event from 2005 and forward. The annual Guerra del Golfo main event consists of three matches in total, with two "qualifying matches", multi-man steel cage matches where the last person left in the cage advances to the main event of the night. The two losers would then be forced to wrestle inside the steel cage, with the loser of that match being forced to either take off their wrestling mask or have their hair shaved off under Lucha de Apuestas, or "Bet match" rules, if they are unmasked.

== Production ==
=== Background ===
Starting as far back as at least 2000, the Mexican wrestling promotion International Wrestling Revolution Group (IWRG; Sometimes referred to as Grupo Internacional Revolución in Spanish) has held several annual events where the main event was a multi-man steel cage match where the last wrestler left in the cage would be forced to either remove their wrestling mask or have their hair shaved off under Lucha de Apuestas, or "bet match", rules. From 2005 IWRG has promoted a spring time show promoting the steel cage match concept under the name Guerra del Golfo, or "Gulf War", referring to the Gulf of Mexico, not the Gulf War in the middle east. The Gurerra del Golfo shows featured two "qualifying" steel cage matches where the loser would later be forced to face off against each other in the main event of the show, a final cage match where the loser would be forced to either unmask or have his/her hair shaved off. The use of the steel cage in three matches distinguishes the Guerra del Golfo event from other Steel cage matches held throughout the year such as the IWRG El Castillo del Terror ("The Tower of Terror"), IWRG Guerra de Sexos ("War of the Sexes") or IWRG Prison Fatal ("Deadly Prison") shows. The Guerra del Golfo shows, as well as the majority of the IWRG shows in general, are held in "Arena Naucalpan", owned by the promoters of IWRG and their main arena. The 2010 Castillo del Terror show was the fourth year IWRG promoted a show under that name and the third year in a row since becoming an annual event from 2008 forward.

=== Storylines ===
The event featured five professional wrestling matches with different wrestlers involved in pre-existing scripted feuds, plots and storylines. Wrestlers were portrayed as either heels (referred to as rudos in Mexico, those that portray the "bad guys") or faces (técnicos in Mexico, the "good guy" characters) as they followed a series of tension-building events, which culminated in a wrestling match or series of matches. The Main Event was a 12-Man Steel Cage Match. The last two wrestlers who remained in the ring fought one on one in a Lucha de Apuestas Match ("Bet match"), wagering their mask on the outcome of the match. The event included wrestlers from International Wrestling Revolution Group (IWRG) as well as a number of Mexican freelance wrestlers.

== Results ==
No.	Results	Stipulations	Times
1	Eragon and Pegasso Kid defeated Alan Extreme and Avisman	Best two-out-of-three falls tag team match	14:15
2	Dr. Cerebro, El Hijo del Pantera and La Roca defeated La Ola Maldita (Bombero Infernal, Maldito, Jr. and Samoth)	Best two-out-of-three falls six-person tag team match	16:59
3	Oficial 911, Angelico, Arlequín Amarillo, El Ángel, Máscara Año 2000, Jr., Pirata Morgan and Yack defeated El Hijo del Diablo	Eight-man "Loser advances" steel cage match	19:00
4	Hijo del Signo, Gringo Loco, El Hijo de Pirata Morgan, Scorpio, Jr., Tinieblas, Jr., Veneno and Zatura defeated Chico Che	Eight-man "Loser advances" steel cage match	26:30
5	El Hijo del Diablo defeated Chico Che	Lucha de Apuesta, hair vs. hair steel cage match	06:13
