= El Castillo del Terror (2011) =

2011 International Wrestling Revolution Group event

- Official poster showing most of the main event competitors
- Promotion: International Wrestling Revolution Group
- Date: November 3, 2011
- City: Naucalpan, State of Mexico
- Venue: Arena Naucalpan

Event chronology
← Previous; Dr. Wagner 50th Anniversary Show	Next → La Gran Cruzada

El Castillo del Terror chronology
← Previous; 2010	Next → 2012

El Castillo del Terror (2011) was a major annually occurring professional wrestling event produced by the International Wrestling Revolution Group (IWRG) that took place on November 3, 2011. The event was the eleventh show held under the El Castillo del Terror banner, with the first taking place in 2000. The main event was the eponymous Castillo del Terror (Spanish for "Castle of Terror") Steel cage match where the last person eliminated would be forced to take off his mask per the match stipulation.

== Production ==
=== Background ===
Starting as far back as at least 2002, the Mexican wrestling promotion International Wrestling Revolution Group (IWRG; Sometimes referred to as Grupo Internacional Revolución in Spanish) has held several annual events where the main event was a multi-man steel cage match where the last wrestler left in the cage would be forced to either remove their wrestling mask or have their hair shaved off under Lucha de Apuestas, or "bet match", rules. From 2005 IWRG has promoted a fall show, around the Mexican Day of the Death, under the name El Castillo del Terror ("The Tower of Terror") to distinguish it from other Steel cage matches held throughout the year such as the IWRG Guerra del Golfo ("Gulf War"), IWRG Guerra de Sexos ("War of the Sexes") or IWRG Prison Fatal ("Deadly Prison") shows. The Castillo del Terror shows, as well as the majority of the IWRG shows in general, are held in "Arena Naucalpan", owned by the promoters of IWRG and their main arena. The 2011 Castillo del Terror show was the seventh year in a row that IWRG promoted a show under that name.

=== Storylines ===
The event featured six professional wrestling matches with different wrestlers involved in pre-existing scripted feuds, plots and storylines. Wrestlers were portrayed as either heels (referred to as rudos in Mexico, those that portray the "bad guys") or faces (técnicos in Mexico, the "good guy" characters) as they followed a series of tension-building events, which culminated in a wrestling match or series of matches. The Main Event of the show was a 10-Man Steel Cage Match where wrestlers could climb out of the cage to escape. The last two wrestlers who remained in the ring would be forced to fight one-on-one in a Lucha de Apuestas, or "Bet match", wagering their mask on the outcome of the match. The event included wrestlers from International Wrestling Revolution Group (IWRG) and a number of Mexican Freelance wrestlers. The undercard featured a Relevos Suicidas, losing team advances tag team match between the teams of Oficial AK-47 and Apolo Estrada, Jr. facing off against Eterno and Multifacético. The losing team would have to wrestle against each other immediately after the match, with each wrestler "betting" something on the outcome of the match. Oficial AK-47, Apolo Estrada, Jr. and Multifacético all put their hair on the line while Eterno put the WWS World Welterweight Championship on the line on the outcome of the match.

== Results ==
No.	Results	Stipulations
1	Astro de Plata and Centvrión defeated Alan Extreme and Rambo, Jr. – Two falls to one	Best two-out-of-three falls Tag Team match
2	Mini Psicosis, Picudo, Jr. and Sexy Star defeated Astro Rey, Jr., Lolita and Mascarita Sagrada	Best two out of three falls Six-person Relevos de Locura match
3	Dinamic Black defeated Comando Negro (C) – Two falls to one	Best two-out-of-three falls match for the IWRG Intercontinental Lightweight Championship
4	Oficial AK-47 and Apolo Estrada, Jr. defeated Eterno and Multifacético – Two falls to zero	Relevos Suicidas, losing team advances tag team match
5	Eterno defeated Multifacético (C) – Two falls to one	Luchas de Apuestas, WWS World Welterweight Championship Vs. Hair match
6	Golden Magic defeated King Drako; Also in the match: Oficial 911, Carta Brava, Jr., El Hijo de L.A. Park, El Hijo de Máscara Año 2000, Machin, Oficial Spartan, Super Nova and Zumbi	10-man El Castillo del Terror Match Luchas de Apuestas, Mask vs. Mask match.

=== El Castillo del Terror order of elimination ===
1. Zumbi
2. Oficial Spartan
3. Super Nova
4. Carta Brava, Jr.
5. Machin
6. El Hijo de L.A. Park
7. El Hijo de Hijo de Máscara Año
8. Oficial 911
