= Guerra del Golfo (2012) =

2012 International Wrestling Revolution Group event

- Official poster depicting several male and female wrestlers competing in the cage matches
- Promotion: International Wrestling Revolution Group
- Date: April 15, 2012
- City: Naucalpan, State of Mexico
- Venue: Arena Naucalpan

Event chronology
| ← Previous; Guerra de Familias | Next → Caravana de Campeones |

Guerra del Golfo chronology
| ← Previous; 2011 | Next → 2013 |

Guerra del Golfo (2012) (Spanish for "Gulf War") was an annual professional wrestling major event produced by Mexican professional wrestling promotion International Wrestling Revolution Group (IWRG), which took place on April 15, 2012 in Arena Naucalpan, Naucalpan, State of Mexico, Mexico. The annual Guerra del Golfo main event consists of three matches in total, with two "qualifying matches", multi-man steel cage matches where the last person left in the cage advances to the main event of the night. The two losers is forced to wrestle inside the steel cage, with the loser being forced to either take off their wrestling mask or have their hair shaved off under Lucha de Apuesta, or "Bet match" rules.

== Production ==
=== Background ===
Starting as far back as at least 2000, the Mexican wrestling promotion International Wrestling Revolution Group (IWRG; Sometimes referred to as Grupo Internacional Revolución in Spanish) has held several annual events where the main event was a multi-man steel cage match where the last wrestler left in the cage would be forced to either remove their wrestling mask or have their hair shaved off under Lucha de Apuestas, or "bet match", rules. From 2005 IWRG has promoted a spring time show promoting the steel cage match concept under the name Guerra del Golfo, or "Gulf War", referring to the Gulf of Mexico, not the Gulf War in the middle east. The Gurerra del Golfo shows featured two "qualifying" steel cage matches where the loser would later be forced to face off against each other in the main event of the show, a final cage match where the loser would be forced to either unmask or have his/her hair shaved off. The use of the steel cage in three matches distinguishes the Guerra del Golfo event from other Steel cage matches held throughout the year such as the IWRG El Castillo del Terror ("The Tower of Terror"), IWRG Guerra de Sexos ("War of the Sexes") or IWRG Prison Fatal ("Deadly Prison") shows. The Guerra del Golfo shows, as well as the majority of the IWRG shows in general, are held in "Arena Naucalpan", owned by the promoters of IWRG and their main arena. The 2012 Castillo del Terror show was the sixth year IWRG promoted a show under that name and the fifth year in a row since becoming an annual event from 2008 forward.

=== Storylines ===
The event featured five professional wrestling matches with different wrestlers involved in pre-existing scripted feuds, plots and storylines. Wrestlers were portrayed as either heels (referred to as rudos in Mexico, those that portray the "bad guys") or faces (técnicos in Mexico, the "good guy" characters) as they followed a series of tension-building events, which culminated in a wrestling match or series of matches. The Main Event was a 12-Man Steel Cage Match. The last two wrestlers who remained in the ring fought one on one in a Lucha de Apuestas Match ("Bet match"), wagering their mask on the outcome of the match. The event included wrestlers from International Wrestling Revolution Group (IWRG) as well as a number of Mexican freelance wrestlers.

In the summer of 2011 the group Los Oficiales introduced a new member called Oficial Spartan, replacing Oficial AK-47, who was unable to wrestle due to an arm injury, in his first match to team up with Oficial 911 and Oficial Fierro. In the fall of 2011 the original Oficiales kicked Spartan out of the group he cost their team a number of matches due to disqualifications. Spartan would return with back up in the form of Oficial Rayan, forming a group called Los Oficiales Elite to start a rival faction to Los Oficiales. In early 2012 Los Oficiales Elite became a trio with the introduction of Oficial Factor to the team.

== Event ==
The opening match, a tag team match between the team of Guerrero Mixtico, Jr. and Matrix, Jr. and the team of Galaxy and Star Boy, Jr., ended after Galaxy dislocated his shoulder and his opponents quickly pinned him to end the match. The second match was originally scheduled to have Tritón team up with Chicano, but due to injuries IWRG decided to replace him with Star Boy, Jr. and have the team of Star Boy, Jr. and Chicano defeat Pacto Negro and The Mummy. The third match of the night was a continuation of the Oficiales vs. Oficiales Elite storyline as two members from each team faced off, Los Oficiales (Oficial 911 and Oficial Fierro) teamed up with Toxico while Oficial Rayan and Oficial Spartan teamed up with veteran wrestler Negro Navarro. Los Oficials Elite won the third and deciding fall when 911 intentionally unmasked Spartan, which is against the rules of Lucha Libre.

The first of the "qualifying" steel cage matches featured nine wrestlers, eight male (Comando Negro, Damian 666, El Hijo del Diablo, Hijo de Pirata Morgan, Oficial Factor, Tony Rivera, Trauma I and X-Fly) and a single female competitor (Ludark Shaitan). The match saw Oficial Factor as the last remaining wrestler in the ring, which meant he was forced to put his mask on the line later on in the show's main event. The second match started out with nine competitors just like the other steel cage match, and again included eight male (Oficial AK-47, Alan Extreme, Bestia 666, Bombero Infernal, Carta Brava, Jr., Halloween, Sexy Lady, Trauma I and Zumbi) and one female (Sexy Lady) competitor. In the latter parts of the match AK-47's partners 911 and Fierro came to the ring and entered the cage, trying to help AK-47 defeat Trauma I. Moments later Trauma I's brother Trauma II came to the ring and also entered the cage. In the end Oficial 911 ended up losing the match instead of one of the scheduled competitors. Like Oficial Factor he was forced to put his mask on the line in the main event steel cage match.

The main event looked to conclude with either Oficial Factor or Oficial 911 unmasking, but as the match was about to begin Factor was joined by his Los Oficiales Elite partners Spartan and Rayan while 911 was joined by AK-47 and Fierro to make it a six-man match where everyone but AK-47 risked their mask and AK-47, since he was already unmasked, risked his hair on the outcome of the match. After a long and brutal match it came down to Factor and AK-47 with Oficial Factor escaping the cage. As a result, Oficial AK-47 was shaved bald afterwards even if he was not the announced participant at the beginning of the match.

=== Results ===
| No. | Results | Stipulations |
|---|---|---|
| 1 | Guerrero Mixtico, Jr. and Matrix, Jr. defeated Galaxy and Star Boy, Jr. – two falls to none | Best two-out-of-three falls tag team match |
| 2 | Chicano and Star Boy, Jr. defeated Pacto Negro and The Mummy – two falls to one | Tag team best two-out-of-three falls tag team match |
| 3 | Negro Navarro and Los Oficiales Elite (Oficial Rayan and Oficial Spartan) defeated Los Oficiales (Oficial 911 and Oficial Fierro) and Toxico by disqualification DQ – two falls to one | Best two-out-of-three falls six-person tag team match |
| 4 | Oficial Factor lost to Comando Negro, Damian 666, El Hijo del Diablo, Hijo de Pirata Morgan, Ludark Shaitan, Tony Rivera, Trauma I and X-Fly | Nine-person "Loser advances" steel cage match |
| 5 | Oficial 911 lost to Oficial AK-47, Alan Extreme, Bestia 666, Bombero Infernal, Carta Brava, Jr., Oficial Fierro, Halloween, Sexy Lady, Trauma I, Trauma II, Zumbi | Twelve-person "Loser advances" steel cage match |
| 6 | Oficial AK-47 lost to Oficial 911, Oficial Factor, Oficial Fierro, Oficial Rayan and Oficial Spartan | six-way Lucha de Apuesta, hair vs. mask steel cage match |

== Aftermath ==
The feud between the two Oficiales factions continued throughout 2012 with several highlights, including Oficial AK-47 winning the vacant IWRG Intercontinental Middleweight Championship in a tournament, which saw him defeat Oficial Spartan in the quarter final. Oficial Factor won the 2012 Rey del Ring tournament, defeating 29 other wrestlers including members of Los Oficiales. On July 26, 2012 Los Oficiales ended Oficiales Elite's reign as Distrito Federal Trios Champions after 129 days. In the fall of 2012 Oficiales Elite changed their name to Los Comandos Élite, but the feud with Los Oficiales remained as intense as ever and led to both Oficial 911 and Factor being part of the main event Prison Fatal match on the 2012 IWRG show called Prison Fatal, where Factor would lose to Hijo de Pirata Morgan.
