= Los Oficiales Elite =

Professional wrestling stable

Stable
- Members: Oficial Rayan; Oficial Spector; Oficial Liderk
- Name(s): Los Oficiales Elite; Los Comandos Elite
- Billed heights: Factor 1.80 m (5 ft 11 in); Rayan 1.81 m (5 ft 11 1/2 in); Spartan 1.80 m (5 ft 11 in)
- Combined billed weight: 286 kg (631 lb)
- Former member(s): Oficial Factor; Oficial Spartan; Oficial Marshall
- Debut: 2011
- Disbanded: 2012

Los Oficiales Elite (Spanish for "The Elite Officials") was a Mexican professional wrestling group, called a stable who works primarily for the Mexican professional wrestling promotion International Wrestling Revolution Group (IWRG). The group is the latest incarnation of the IWRG stable Los Oficiales, with the two groups being rivals since Los Oficiales Elite was created in 2011. All three members were masked and used Police officer / SWAT team ring characters.

== History ==
In the summer of 2011 the group Los Oficiales introduced a new member called Oficial Spartan, replacing Oficial AK-47, who was unable to wrestle due to an arm injury, in his first match to team up with Oficial 911 and Oficial Fierro. in the following weeks Oficial Spartan was shown to not just be a temporary replacement for Oficial AK-47, but an expansion of the team as he teamed with all three original members at various times even after AK-47 returned to the ring. After a while Spartan and the original Oficiales had a falling out after Spartan cost their team a number of matches due to disqualifications and they kicked him out of the group. Spartan would return with back up in the form of Oficial Rayan, forming a group called Los Oficiales Elite to start a rival faction to Los Oficiales. Spartan and rival Oficial 911 were both part of the 2011 Castillo del Terror ("Castle of Terror") match, a steel cage match where all the contestants put their mask on the line. The rivals both escaped the cage with their masks intact. In early 2012 Los Oficiales Elite became a trio with the introduction of Oficial Factor to the team. On March 18, 2012 Los Oficiales Elite defeated Los Gringos VIP (Apolo Estrada, Jr., Avisman and Hijo del Diablo) to win the Distrito Federal Trios Championship, a title that is only sanctioned in Mexico City. The Oficiales vs Oficiales Elite feud led to all six competitors putting their masks on the line in a Steel Cage match as the main event of the 2012 Guerra del Golfo show. During the show Oficial Factor and 911 both lost a steel cage match, which meant that the two were supposed to face off in the final match, but as a show of unity their respective partners all joined them in the steel cage, making it a six-way match instead. The match came down to Oficial Factor and Oficial AK-47 with Factor gaining the important victory, forcing AK-47 to have his hair shaved off as a result. The feud between the two factions continued throughout 2012 with several highlights, including Oficial AK-47 winning the vacant IWRG Intercontinental Middleweight Championship in a tournament, which saw him defeat Oficial Spartan in the quarter-final. Oficial Factor won the 2012 Rey del Ring tournament, defeating 29 other wrestlers including members of Los Oficiales. On July 26, 2012 Los Oficiales ended Oficiales Elite's reign as Distrito Federal Trios Championship after 129 days. In the fall and winter of 2012 the individual members of Los Oficiales Elite began focusing on individual storylines instead of the overall "Oficiales vs. Oficiales" storyline. Factor became involved in a storyline with El Hijo de Pirata Morgan, which saw Factor win the IWRG Junior de Juniors Championship from Hijo de Pirata as well as lose and regain the Rey del Ring Championship. In late November, 2012 it was announced that Oficial Factor, Hijo de Pirata Morgan, Oficial 911 and Hijo de Máscara Año 2000 had all agreed to risk their masks in a Prison Fatal steel cage match on December 2, 2012. The Prison Fatal match came down to Factor and Oficial 911 after the other two competitors escaped the cage. At one point all Oficiales and Oficiales Elite were actually in the cage, but in the end 911 managed to escape, forcing Factor to unmask. After unmasking he gave his name as Cesar Caballero, the same name he gave when he lost the "Mega" mask in 2004. On January 1, 2013, Factor defeated Hijo del Pirata Morgan to win the IWRG Junior de Juniors Championship in a match where his Rey del Ring Championship was also on the line.

== Championships and accomplishments ==
Only championships won while members of Los Oficiales Elite are listed.

- International Wrestling Revolution Group
  - Distrito Federal Trios Championship (2 times) – Oficial Factor, Oficial Spartan and Oficial Rayan (Note: The title is only sanctioned for Mexico City shows but is officially recognized by IWRG.)
  - IWRG Intercontinental Welterweight Championship (1 time) – Oficial Rayan
  - IWRG Junior de Juniors Championship (2 times) – Oficial Factor (Note: IWRG never revealed exactly how Oficial Factor was considered a second-generation wrestler.)
  - IWRG Rey del Ring Championship (2 times, current) – Oficial Factor

== Luchas de Apuestas record ==
Luchas de Apuestas participation while members of Los Oficiales Elite are listed.

Winner (wager)	Loser (wager)	Location	Event	Date	Notes
Oficial Factor (mask)	Oficial AK-47 (hair)	Naucalpan, Mexico State	Guerra del Golfo	April 15, 2012	(Note: Six man Steel cage match that also included the other members of Los Oficiales Elite and Los Oficiales.)
Oficial 911 (mask)	Oficial Factor (mask)	Naucalpan, Mexico State	Prisión Fatal	December 2, 2012	(Note: Steel cage match, which originally also included Hijo de Pirata Morgan and Hijo de Máscara Año 2000. Oficial AK-47, Oficial Fierro, Oficial Rayan and Oficial Spartans all entered the cage to interfere in the match.)
Black Dragón (mask)	Oficial Spartan (mask)	Naucalpan, State of Mexico	El Castillo del Terror	November 1, 2017	(Note: Last two competitors in a steel cage match that also included La Mosca, Capo del Norte, Tortuga Leo, Trauma I, Violencia Jr. and Warrior Jr.)
Oficial Spector (mask)	Black Dragón (mask)	Naucalpan, State of Mexico	Arena Naucalpan 40th Anniversary Show	December 17, 2017	(Note: Oficial Rayan was scheduled to defend his mask, but was injured and Spector replaced him.)
Black Dragón (hair)	Oficial Spartan (hair)	Naucalpan, State of Mexico	Cabellera vs. Cabellera	February 11, 2018	
Tortuga Mike (mask)	Oficial Spector (mask)	Naucalpan, State of Mexico	El Castillo del Terror	November 1, 2018	(Note: Last two competitors in a steel cage match that also included Aramís, Diosa Atenea, Dragón Bane, El Hijo del Alebrije, El Hijo de Canis Lupus, Relámpago, Ludark Shaitan, Shil-Kah, Tortuga Leo and Zumbi.)
