= El Hijo del Diablo =

Mexican professional wrestler

El Hijo del Diablo Nombre real eugenia gonzales
Personal information
- Born: Juan Carlos Gonzales; November 4, 1962 (age 63) Cuernavaca, Morelos, Mexico

Professional wrestling career
- Ring name(s): Águila Venezolana; El Hijo del Diablo; Super Amigo
- Billed height: 1.70 m (5 ft 7 in)
- Billed weight: 78 kg (172 lb)
- Trained by: Tartú El Brujo
- Debut: December 10, 1979

Juan Carlos Gonzales (born November 4, 1962), better known under the ring name El Hijo del Diablo (Spanish for "The Son of the Devil"), is a Mexican professional wrestler, currently working on the Mexican Independent circuit and has regularly worked for International Wrestling Revolution Group (IWRG) portraying a rudo ("bad guy") wrestling character. He is a founding member of the IWRG group Los Gringos VIP.

== Professional wrestling career ==
Juan Carlos Gonzales began his professional wrestling career on December 10, 1979, at the age of 17. Initially he worked primarily around his native Cuernavaca, Morelos as the masked wrestling character Águila Venezolana (Spanish for "Venezuelan Eagle"). As he gained more experience he ventured outside Morelos and began wrestling all over Mexico.

=== El Hijo del Diablo (unknown–1994) ===
It has not been documented exactly when Juan Gonzales changed from his Águila Venezolana to adopt the more sinister, rudo (wrestlers who portray the "bad guys") character El Hijo del Diablo (Spanish for "The Son of the Devil"). In Mexico, masked wrestlers keep their true identity secret from the general audience, which meant that for decades it was not revealed it was Gonzales under the Águila Venezolana mask, not was it common knowledge that it was the same wrestler portraying both characters. In the early 1990s Hijo del Diablo worked for the Universal Wrestling Association (UWA), although he worked for the UWA when its popularity was falling. In the UWA he was teamed up with Lobo Rubio and Shu El Guerrero as the UWA tried to replace the Los Temerarios after Black Terry and Jose Luis Feliciano both had left the promotion. The trio unsuccessfully challenged Los Villanos (Villano I, Villano IV and Villano V) for the UWA World Trios Championship in early 1992 but was disbanded soon after. When the promotion collapsed Gonzales joined the recently formed Asistencia Asesoría y Administración (AAA) wrestling promotion instead, continuing to work as El Hijo del Diablo.

=== Super Amigo (1994–1995) ===
In 1994 Juan Gonzales was given a new ring character by owner Antonio Peña, Peña had decided to replace the dark rudo character with "Super Amigo", a kid-friendly clown like masked character for Gonzales. Super Amigo teamed up with El Depredador and El Puma to defeat the Exotico team of May Flowers, Pimpinela Escarlata and Rudy Reyna as part of AAA's Triplemanía II-C show. His team won when Super Amigo pinned Escarlata in the third and deciding fall. Gonzales, as Super Amigo, would work off and on for AAA over the next year in low card matches.

=== El Hijo del Diablo (1996–present) ===
In 1996 Black Terry had started working as "El Hijo del Diablo", on the Mexican independent circuit, but stopped using the mask and name after Juan Gonzales resumed the role. Following his AAA departure El Hijo del Diablo worked for over a year for Promo Azteca, a promotion that had split off from AAA previously, but the promotion went out of business before 2000. In late 2000 El Hijo del Diablo began a storyline feud against a character that was portrayed as the complete opposite, El Hijo del Santo, in a feud that pitted "The Son of the Devil" against the "Son of the Saint". On November 23, 2000, Hijo del Diablo defeated Hijo del Santo to win the WWA World Welterweight Championship. Hijo del Diablo would hold the title for 707 days into total until El Hijo del Santo reclaimed the championship to end the storyline between the two. Around the time the storyline against El Hijo del Santo ended Gonzales began working on a regular basis for International Wrestling Revolution Group (IWRG), one of the largest local promotions in Mexico, centered in Naucalpan, State of Mexico. In IWRG he became involved in a storyline feud against Fantasy, a storyline that led to a Lucha de Apuestas, or bet match, between the two that had both men risk their mask on the outcome. El Hijo del Diablo was successful, forcing Fantasy to remove his mask and announce his birth name as per the stipulations of a Lucha de Apuestas match. A few months later Hijo del Diablo teamed up with Bombero Infernal and EL Engendro to defeat the trio of Dr. Cerebro, Cirujano and Paramedico, winning the Distrito Federal Trios Championship. The trio only held the championship briefly before losing it to Los Megas (Mega, Omega and Ultra Mega) in late 2002. IWRG held a tournament for the vacant IWRG Intercontinental Trios Championship in May and June, 2003 which saw Hijo del Diablo and his partners defeated by Los Megas in the tournament. In 2006 he became involved in a storyline feud against one of Consejo Mundial de Lucha Libre (CMLL) rising stars Místico, that led to the two facing off in a "mask vs. mask", Lucha de Apuestas match on December 1, 2006. Místico won the match and the mask of El Hijo del Diablo, who was forced to unmask for the first time in his career. Gonzales was at the center of some controversy after the match as he had stormed out of the ring after removing his mask, instead of letting the fans see his face. He later claimed he had not been paid by the promoter for the mask loss, although the issue was later resolved when Gonzales was paid the bonus he was promised for losing his mask. A few weeks later Hijo del Diablo teamed up with Veneno and Fantasma de la Opera to win the IWRG Intercontinental Trios Championship by defeating Dr. Cerebro, Suicida and Cerebro Negro in the finals of a tournament for the vacant title. The trio held the belts for 52 days before Dr. Cerebro, Suicida and Cerebro Negro defeated them to take the championship.

==== Los Gringos VIP (2009–2015) ====
In 2009 El Hijo del Diablo teamed up with Gringo Loco and Avisman to form a group known as Los Gringos VIP, with both Hijo del Diablo and Avisman "defecting" and declaring that they were indeed Gringos. The storyline included all three wrestlers wearing wrestling gear with the Stars and Stripes on them, similar to the Los Gringos Locos faction in the mid-1990s. During the storyline El Hijo del Diablo began defending a championship called the "World Wrestling Superstars" (WWS) World Welterweight Championship without revealing where or how he had won the championship, or if he even HAD won it, before showing up in IWRG with the belt. On March 21, 2010, Dr. Cerebro pinned El Hijo del Diablo to win the WWS World Welterweight Championship, marking IWRG's official recognition of the championship. Los Gringos VIP entered an eight team tournament for the vacant Distrito Federal Trios Championship, that had been vacated when Cerebro Negro, part of the previous championship team, had stopped working for IWRG. Los Gringos VIP defeated Cerebro Negro, Kaos and Veneo in the first round, Black Terry, Dr. Cerebro and El Hijo del Signo in the second round and finally the team of Máscara Año 2000, Hijo de Máscara Año 2000 and Máscara Año 2000, Jr. in the finals to win the championship. Over the next year Los Gringos VIP defended the championship on multiple occasions, but by the end of 2011 Gringo Loco had not worked for IWRG for several months. Los Gringos VIP petitioned to have their latest member Apolo Estrada, Jr. replace Gringo Loco, which was allowed in December, 2011. On January 13, 2011, El Hijo del Signo teamed up with rookie Muerte Infernal for the 2011 Torneo Relampago de Proyeccion a Nuevas Promesas de la Lucha Libre (Spanish for "Projecting a new promise lightning tournament") but lost in the first round to Black Terry and Keshin Black. On March 18, 2013 Los Gringos VIP's reign as Distrito Federal Trios Champions came to an end as they lost to Los Oficiales Elite (Oficial Factor, Oficial Rayan and Oficial Spartan) Following the title loss Gringos VIP began to work less and less as a team, at times teaming with various replacement "Gringos" such as Destroyer, Kid USA and Picudo, Jr. but did little of note. On May 6, 2012, at IWRG's Caravan de Campeones, Hijo del Diablo was one of eight wrestlers competing for the vacant IWRG Intercontinental Middleweight Championship, but was defeated in the opening round by Veneno. One of the last shows Hijo del Diablo worked for IWRG was their annual Festival de las Máscaras show where previously unmasked wrestlers were allowed to work under their mask for one night a year. On the show Hijo del Diablo teamed up with Oficial AK-47 and Eita, only to lose to longtime rivals Dr. Cerebro and Mike Segura (wrestling as Orrito), teaming up with Trauma II. On September 16, 2015 Los Gringos VIP won the IWRG Intercontinental Tag Team Championship for a second time as they won a Steel cage match against champions Pantera and El Hijo del Pantera and Los Traumas.

==== Los Mariachis Locos (2016–present) ====
On May 1, 2016 Los Mariachis Locos lost the Distrito Federal Trios Championship to Los Tortuga Ninjas ("The Ninja Turtles"; Leo, Mike and Rafy).

== Personal life ==
Juan Carlos Gonzales' son is also a professional wrestler, working as the enmascarado character "Diablo, Jr." on the Mexican independent circuit.

== Championships and accomplishments ==
- International Wrestling Revolution Group

- Distrito Federal Trios Championship (6 times) - with Bombero Infernal and El Engendro (1), Avisman, Gringo Loco (1)/Apolo Estrada, Jr. (3) and Diablo I Jr and Imposible (2). (Note: The title is sanctioned by the Mexico City wrestling commission but promoted by IWRG.)
- IWRG Intercontinental Tag Team Championship (2 times) - with Apolo Estrada, Jr.
- IWRG Intercontinental Trios Championship (1 time) – with Fantasma De La Opera and Veneno)
- WWS World Welterweight Championship (2 times, final)
- Distrito Federal Trios Title Tournament (2010) - with Avisman and Gringo Loco

- Mexican Independent circuit
  - Morelos Middleweight Championship (1 time)
  - World Martial Arts Championship (1 time)
- WWA World Welterweight Championship
  - WWA World Welterweight Championship (1 time)

== Lucha de Apuesta record ==
Winner (wager)	Loser (wager)	Location	Event	Date	Notes
El Hijo del Diablo (mask)	Potro Salvaje (mask)	Celaya, Guanajuato	Live event	October 1988	
El Hijo del Diablo (mask)	Romano García (hair)	Celaya, Guanajuato	Live event	November 1988	
El Hijo del Diablo (mask)	Resplandor (hair)	Celaya, Guanajuato	Live event	June 10, 1992	
El Hijo del Diablo (mask)	X-Man (mask)	Tulancingo, Hidalgo	Live event	July 30, 1998	
El Hijo del Diablo (mask)	Orion (mask)	Aguascalientes, Aguascalientes	Live event	November 2, 2000	
El Hijo del Diablo (mask)	Salsero (hair)	Tulancingo, Hidalgo	Live event	September 16, 2001	
El Hijo del Diablo (mask)	Full Contact (mask)	Aguascalientes, Aguascalientes	Live event	July 25, 2002	(Note: Finals of a Ruleta de la Muerte tournament)
El Hijo del Diablo (mask)	Fantasy (mask)	Naucalpan, State of Mexico	IWRG Show	November 3, 2002	
Místico (mask)	El Hijo del Diablo (mask)	Tijuana, Baja California	Live event	December 1, 2006	
El Hijo del Diablo (hair)	Black Terry (hair)	Naucalpan, State of Mexico	IWRG Show	February 7, 2009	(Note: Last two men in a steel cage match that also included Gringo Loco and Dr. Cerebro.)
El Hijo del Diablo (hair)	Chico Che (hair)	Naucalpan, State of Mexico	Guerra del Golfo	February 28, 2010	(Note: Main event steel cage match.)
El Hijo del Diablo (hair)	Cerebro Negro (hair)	Naucalpan, State of Mexico	IWRG event	March 28, 2016	
El Hijo del Diablo (hair)	Black Terry (hair)	Naucalpan, State of Mexico	IWRG event	October 23, 2016	

== See also ==
- List of people from Morelos
