= Oficial Rayan =

Mexican professional wrestler

Personal information
- Born: January 9, 1987 (age 39) Mexico City, Mexico

Professional wrestling career
- Ring name: Oficial Rayan
- Billed height: 1.81 m (5 ft 11 1/2 in)
- Billed weight: 86 kg (190 lb)
- Trained by: Black Terry; Judas el Traidor
- Debut: January 2009

Oficial Rayan (born January 9, 1987) is a Mexican professional wrestler, who is working for the Mexican promotion International Wrestling Revolution Group (IWRG). He was part of the Los Oficiales Elite group alongside Oficial Factor and Oficial Spartan. Rayan's real name is not a matter of public record, as is often the case with masked wrestlers in Mexico where their private lives are kept a secret from the wrestling fans.

== Professional wrestling career ==
In Mexico, it is traditional to keep the true identify of a masked professional wrestler a secret, not revealing their real names and oftentimes not revealing what previous ring names they have competed under. No previous ring identities have been confirmed for Oficial Rayan, but Rayan has stated that he made his debut in January 2009 in a loss to wrestler Imperio Azteca, but not confirmed what ring name he worked under between 2009 and 2011.

=== Oficial Rayan (2011–present) ===
IWRG introduced a new professional wrestling character in late October, 2011 called Oficial Rayan, brought in to team with Oficial Spartan as he feuded with his former team mates Los Oficiales (Oficial 911 Oficial AK-47 and Oficial Fierro). Together Spartan and Rayan formed a unit called Los Oficiales Elite. In early 2012 Los Oficiales Elite became a trio with the introduction of Oficial Factor to the team, matching the numbers of Los Oficiales. On March 18, 2012, Los Oficiales Elite defeated Los Gringos VIP (Apolo Estrada, Jr., Avisman, and Hijo del Diablo) to win the Distrito Federal Trios Championship, a title that is only sanctioned in Mexico City. The Oficiales vs Oficiales Elite feud led to all six competitors putting their masks or hair (AK-47 was the only one who was unmasked at the time) on the line in a steel cage match as the main event of the 2012 Guerra del Golfo show. During the show Oficial Factor and 911 both lost a steel cage match, which meant that the two were supposed to face off in the final match, but as a show of unity their respective partners all joined them in the steel cage, making it a six-way match instead. The match came down to Oficial Factor and Oficial AK-47 with Factor gaining the important victory, forcing AK-47 to have his hair shaved off as a result. Oficial Rayan participated in the 2012 Rey del Ring tournament, a 30-man Royal Rumble style event. Rayan did not win the tournament but his partner Oficial Factor did. On July 26, Los Oficiales Elite lost the Distrito Federal Trios Championship to Los Oficiales, ending their reign at 129 days. In late 2012 the individual members of Los Oficiales Elite began focusing on individual storylines instead of the overall "Oficiales vs. Oficiales" storyline. On October 7, Rayan won the IWRG Intercontinental Welterweight Championship by defeating Eterno. he held the title until February 24, 2013, when he lost it to Dinamic Black.

== Championships and accomplishments ==
- International Wrestling Revolution Group
  - Distrito Federal Trios Championship (1 time) – with Oficial Factor and Oficial Spartan (Note: The title is only sanctioned for Mexico City shows but is officially recognized by IWRG.)
  - IWRG Intercontinental Welterweight Championship (1 time)
