= Ruleta =

Ruleta (Spanish "roulette") may refer to:

== Music ==
- Ruleta, opera by Enric Palomar (1998)
- Ruleta Rusa (es), album by Joaquin Sabina (1984)
- Ruleta Rusa, album by Annette Moreno (2004)
- "Ruleta" (Danna Paola song)
- "Ruleta" (Inna song)
- "Ruleta", song by Los Piojos from Verde paisaje del Infierno
- "Ruleta", Slovenian song by Modus from The Best of 1979–1988: Vol 2

== See also ==
- La ruleta de la fortuna, Spanish version of TV's Wheel of Fortune
- IWRG Ruleta de la Muerte type of professional wrestling tournament
  - Ruleta de la Muerte (1998) professional wrestling Pay-Per-View event
  - Ruleta de la Muerte (1999) professional wrestling Pay-Per-View event
  - IWRG Ruleta de la Muerte (2009)
  - IWRG Ruleta de la Muerte (2012)
  - IWRG Ruleta de la Muerte (2013)
  - IWRG Ruleta de la Muerte (April 2015)
  - IWRG Ruleta de la Muerte (November 2015)
