= IWRG Ruleta de la Muerte (2013) =

2013 International Wrestling Revolution Group event

- Promotion: International Wrestling Revolution Group
- Date: October 27, 2013
- City: Naucalpan, State of Mexico
- Venue: Arena Naucalpan

Event chronology
← Previous; Invasion RCH/IWRG	Next → El Castillo del Terror

IWRG Ruleta de la Muerte chronology
← Previous; 2012	Next → April 2015

The Mexican professional wrestling promotion International Wrestling Revolution Group (IWRG; Sometimes referred to as Grupo Internacional Revolución in Mexico) produced and scripted a Ruleta de la Muerte (Spanish for "Roulette of Death") tournament on October 27, 2013. The show took place in Arena Naucalpan, in Naucalpan, State of Mexico, Mexico, IWRG's main venue and the site of the majority of all their major shows and tournaments.

The lucha libre concept of a Ruleta de la Muerte tournament sees tag teams battle it out, with the losing team in the match advancing in the tournament. The team to lose the last tag team match will then be forced to wrestle each other under Lucha de Apuestas, or "bet match" rules, in this case putting their hair on the line. For the 2013 Ruleta de la Muerte IWRG booked four intergender tag teams to compete against each other, the teams were Bugambilia and La Sádica, Apolo Estrada Jr. and Diva Salvaje, Imposible and La Heroína, Dr. Cerebro and Miss Gaviota. In the end La Sádica pinned Bugambila, forcing Bugambilia to have all his hair shaved off.

== Production ==
=== Background ===
Mexican lucha libre, or professional wrestling, has a long-standing tradition around the wrestling mask and its role in both lucha libre and the culture of Mexico itself. In 1940 the Lucha de Apuestas, or "Bet match", was invented where a wrestler would either bet their mask or their hair (or on rare occasions their career) on the outcome of the match. If a masked wrestler lost the match he would be forced to remove his mask, state his given name and then never be allowed to wrestle with that mask on again. If an unmasked wrestler lost a Lucha de Apuestas he or she would be forced to have all his/her hair shaved off while standing in the middle of the ring, suffering the humiliation in front of everyone in attendance. Over time the Lucha de Apuestas matches became more prestigious than championship matches in Mexico and would often headline major shows. It is unclear exactly when the Rouleta de la Muerte (Spanish for "Roulete of Death"), some times also referred to as Ruleta Rusa (Russian Roulette), tournament concept was created. The concept of the tournament is similar to another lucha libre staple the Professional wrestling tag team match types#Parejas SuicidasParejas Suicidas ("Suicide Teams") or Relevos suicida ("Suicide Relays") match. in a Parejas Suicida teams of two, often composed of rivals, have to wrestle against each other, the losing team is then forced to fight each other as "punishment" for losing the match. In a Ruleta de la Muerte the number of teams is expanded, often to four or eight teams. these teams face off and the losing team in each match moves on to the next round, until the team that loses the finals of the tag team portion are forced to face off for either their mask or their hair.

The earliest recorded Rouleta de la Muerte was held on October 11, 1975 by at the Plaza de Toros Mexico in Mexico City. In the tournament As Charro and Gallo Tapado defeated Chicano Power and Sangre Fria, forcing them to unmask, as well as winning 40.000 Pesos. The Mexican professional wrestling promotion International Wrestling Revolution Group (IWRG; Sometimes referred to as Grupo Internacional Revolución in Spanish) held their first Ruleta de la Muerte tournament in 1998 as well, part of their Arena Naucalpan 21st Anniversary Show held on December 20, 1998 and saw the masked Mega defeat Judo Suwa, forcing the Japanese wrestler to be shaved bald as a result. In 2006 they held another Ruleta de la Muerte tournament, this time as part of their 2006. For this event the tournament format was slightly modified, using two first round matches where six wrestlers fought to stay out of the final Lucha de Apuestas match. In the end, the masked Coco Verde pinned Dr. Cerebro, forcing Dr. Cerebro to have all his hair shaved off. In 2009 IWRG held the 2009 Ruleta de la Muerte show, with the eponymous tournament as the focal point. In the finale, Gringo Loco defeated Chico Che after the team had lost two matches to get in the finals. The 2013 Ruleta de la Muerte show held under the brand with the first one being held in 2009.

=== Storylines ===
The event featured six professional wrestling matches with different wrestlers involved in pre-existing scripted feuds, plots and storylines. Wrestlers were portrayed as either heels (referred to as rudos in Mexico, those that portray the "bad guys") or faces (técnicos in Mexico, the "good guy" characters) as they followed a series of tension-building events, which culminated in a wrestling match or series of matches.

== Event ==
Karate Kid was originally scheduled for the second match of the night, but when the match took place IWRG had replaced him with Epidermia without an official explanation. Bombero Infernal won the fourth match of the night, a best two-out-of-three-falls match against Tony Rivera in two straight falls. In the first fall Rivera was disqualified for accidentally hitting the referee while Bombero Infernal forced Rivera to submit in the second round to win the match.

The Ruleta de la Muerte main event began as a four-way tag team match where two of the teams were mixed gender with Imposible and female wrestler La Heroina teaming up as well as the Exótico Bugambilia teaming up with female wrestler La Sádica. The other two teams consisted of a male from the regular division and an Exótico as Dr. Cerebro teamed up with Miss Gaviota (Exótico) and Apolo Estrada Jr. teamed up with Diva Salvaje (Exótico). Under the rules a team would escape the match when they pinned one of their opponents, leaving the last team to fight each other after three other teams eliminated themselves. The first team to leave the match was Dr. Cerebro and Miss Gaviota, followed by Imposible and La Heroina and then finally Apolo Estrada Jr. and Diva Salvaje. For the final match La Sádica had Alan Extreme in her corner while Picudo Jr. served as Bugambilia's corner man. In the closing moments of the match Picudo Jr. turned on Bugambilia and landed a low blow on him as the referee had his attention on Alan Extreme. After the foul La Sádica pinned Bugambilia to win the match and forced the Exótico to have all his hair shaved off.

== Results ==
No.	Results	Stipulations
1	Los Oficialitos (Oficialito 911, Oficialito AK47, Oficialito Fierro) defeated Dragón de Oriente, Mini Dr. Xtreme, Mini Multifacetico	Best two-out-of-three-falls six-man tag team match
2	Alan Extreme, Dragón Celestial and Golden Magic defeated Ciclón Black, Epidemia and Guerrero Mixtico	Best two-out-of-three-falls six-man tag team match
3	Bombero Infernal defeated Tony Rivera	Best two-out-of-three-falls match
4	Extreme Tiger, Pirata Morgan Jr. and Relámpago defeated Kalim Black, Picudo Jr. and X-Fly	Best two-out-of-three-falls six-man tag team match
5	Bugambilia and La Sádica lost to Apolo Estrada Jr. / Diva Salvaje and Imposible / La Heroína and Dr. Cerebro / Miss Gaviota	Ruleta de la Muerte
6	La Sádica defeated Bugambilia	Best two-out-of-three-falls Lucha de Apuestas, hair vs. hair match.
