= IWRG La Ruleta de la Muerte Máscaras (2019) =

Mexican professional wrestling show

IWRG La Ruleta de la Muerte Máscaras (2019); (Arena Naucalpan 42nd Anniversary Show)
- Official poster for the event
- Promotion: International Wrestling Revolution Group
- Date: December 22, 2019
- City: Naucalpan, State of Mexico
- Venue: Arena Naucalpan

Event chronology
← Previous; El Castillo del Terror	Next → Cinco Luchas en Jaula

Ruleta de la Muerte chronology
← Previous; November 2015	Next → —

Arena Naucalpan anniversary show chronology
← Previous; Arena Naucalpan 41st Anniversary Show	Next → Arena Naucalpan 43rd Anniversary Show

The Mexican professional wrestling promotion International Wrestling Revolution Group (IWRG; Sometimes referred to as Grupo Internacional Revolución in Mexico) produced and scripted a La Ruleta de la Muerte Máscaras (Spanish for "Roulette of Death of masks") tournament on December 22, 2018. The show took place in Arena Naucalpan, in Naucalpan, State of Mexico, Mexico, IWRG's main venue and the site of the majority of all their major shows and tournaments, and also served as the celebration of the 42nd anniversary of Arena Naucalpan.

For the event IWRG booked representatives of several wrestling schools for a special tag team tournament where the main trainer from the school teamed up with one of their students. The losing team of the tournament would see the student be forced to unmask per the tournament stipulation. In the end Gym Zeus trainer Oficial 911 and trainee Ketzal defeated Gym Warrior trainer Warrior Jr. and Gato Negro. As a result, Gato Negro unmasked and revealed his real name. Other schools represented were: Gym FILL (trainer Negro Navarro and Puma de Oro), Gym Zaetas (trainer Freelance and Neza Kid Jr.), Gym Mexa (trainer Toro Negro and Torito Negro) and Gym Argentia (trainer Dragón Fly and Guerrero Olímpico). On the undercard Güero Tijuana was shaved bald as a result of losing a six-way Lucha de Apuestas, bet match, to Chicanito (winner), Baby Star, Canibal Jr., Poético, and Chef Benito. The show included five other matches.

== Production ==
=== Background ===
In Lucha libre, the Mexican version of professional wrestling, the Ruleta de la Muerte ("Roulette of Death") is a type of Professional wrestling tournament where the loser or losers of a match would advance in the tournament instead of the winners. The finals of a Ruleta de la Muerte tournament featured the losing team wrestle each other under Lucha de Apuestas, or "bet match" rules, where the loser would be forced to either unmask or have all their hair shaved off as a result. Various Mexican promotions have held Ruleta de la Muerte tournaments, some like International Wrestling Revolution Group (IWRG; Sometimes referred to as Grupo Internacional Revolución in Mexico) has held these tournaments on a regular basis. The earliest such tournament was in 1998 part of the Arena Naucalpan 21st Anniversary Show and saw Mega defeat Judo Suwa, forcing the Japanese wrestler to have his hair shaved off. Most of the Ruleta de la Muerte tournaments have followed the traditional lucha libre format, except for the April 2015 Ruleta de la Muerte show, where it instead was a four-man steel cage match instead. 2015 saw a second Ruleta de la Muerte tournament, where Diva Salvaje and Toscano defeated Danny Casas and X-Fly, after which Danny Casas pinned X-Fly to force X-Fly to be shaved bald as a result.

Promoter Adolfo Moreno had promoted Lucha Libre, or professional wrestling in Naucalpan, State of Mexico, Mexico prior to financing the building of Arena Naucalpan that opened in late 1976. Originally Moreno worked together with the Universal Wrestling Association (UWA) and then later Consejo Mundial de Lucha Libre (CMLL) as a local promoter. On January 1, 1996, Moreno created International Wrestling Revolution Group (IWRG) as an independent promotion. IWRG celebrates the anniversary of Arena Naucalpan each year in December with a major show, making it the second oldest, still promoted show series in the world. pre-dating WrestleMania by eight years. Only the CMLL Anniversary Show series has a longer history. The December 17, 2019 Arena Naucalpan show marked the 42nd Anniversary of Arena Naucalpan.

=== Storylines ===
The La Ruleta de la Muerte Máscaras show featured seven professional wrestling matches with different wrestlers involved in pre-existing scripted feuds, plots and storylines. Wrestlers were portrayed as either heels (referred to as rudos in Mexico, those that portray the "bad guys") or faces (técnicos in Mexico, the "good guy" characters) as they followed a series of tension-building events, which culminated in a wrestling match or series of matches.

== Matches ==
No.	Results	Stipulations
1	Galactus, Noicy Boy, and Voltar defeated Bisofera, Príncipe Jr., and Voltrex	Best two-out-of-three falls six-man tag team match
2	Astroboy, Dinámico, and Spider Fly defeated Canival King, Carnicero, and Epsecie Maligna	Best two-out-of-three falls six-man tag team match
3	Kid Jaguar, Piloto Infernal, and Tromba defeated Ángel Estrella Jr., Príncipe Aéreo, and Salchichita	Best two-out-of-three falls six-man tag team match
4	Death Metal, Metal, and Taurino defeated Comando Negro, Manchas, and Rey Quetzal	Best two-out-of-three falls six-man tag team match
5	Chicanito defeated Güero Tijuana; Also in the match: Baby Star, Canibal Jr., Poético, and Chef Benito	Lucha de Apuestas, hair vs. hair match
6	Ave Rex, Hip Hop Man, and La Mosca defeated Auzter, Black Dragón, and Halcón Negro Jr. by disqualification	Best two-out-of-three falls six-man tag team match
7	Ketzal and Oficial 911 defeated Gato Negro and Warrior Jr. Also in the match: Neza Kid Jr. and Freelance, Torito Negro and Toro Negro, Puma de Oro and Black Terry, Guerrero Olímpico and Dragón Fly	Maestro/Estudiante Ruleta de la Muerte tournament
