= IWRG Ruleta de la Muerte (April 2015) =

2015 International Wrestling Revolution Group event

Ruleta de la Muerte (April 2015)
- Official poster of the event, showing the four men in the ring (clock wise) Eterno, X-Fly, Veneno and Ricky Cruz
- Promotion: International Wrestling Revolution Group
- Date: April 19, 2015
- City: Naucalpan, State of Mexico
- Venue: Arena Naucalpan

Event chronology
← Previous; Rey del Ring	Next → Festival de las Máscaras

IWRG Ruleta de la Muerte chronology
← Previous; 2013	Next → November 2015

Ruleta de la Muerte (April 2015) (Spanish for "Roulette of Death") was an annual professional wrestling major event produced and scripted by the Mexican professional wrestling promotion International Wrestling Revolution Group (IWRG), which took place on May 5, 2015 in Arena Naucalpan, Naucalpan, State of Mexico, Mexico. The event was named after the Maine vent match, the Ruleta de la Muerte, a steel cage match where all four of the competitors were chained together. The last man in the cage would be forced to have his hair shaved off as a result. The four competitors risking their hair in the match were Ricky Cruz, Eterno, Veneno and X-Fly. The show featured four additional matches.

== Production ==
=== Background ===
Mexican lucha libre, or professional wrestling, has a long-standing tradition around the wrestling mask and its role in both lucha libre and the culture of Mexico itself. In 1940 the Lucha de Apuestas, or "Bet match", was invented where a wrestler would either bet their mask or their hair (or on rare occasions their career) on the outcome of the match. If a masked wrestler lost the match he would be forced to remove his mask, state his given name and then never be allowed to wrestle with that mask on again. If an unmasked wrestler lost a Lucha de Apuestas he or she would be forced to have all his/her hair shaved off while standing in the middle of the ring, suffering the humiliation in front of everyone in attendance. Over time the Lucha de Apuestas matches became more prestigious than championship matches in Mexico and would often headline major shows. It is unclear exactly when the Rouleta de la Muerte (Spanish for "Roulete of Death"), some times also referred to as Ruleta Rusa (Russian Roulette), tournament concept was created. The concept of the tournament is similar to another lucha libre staple the Parejas Suicidas ("Suicide Teams") or Relevos suicida ("Suicide Relays") match. in a Parejas Suicida teams of two, often composed of rivals, have to wrestle against each other, the losing team is then forced to fight each other as "punishment" for losing the match. In a Ruleta de la Muerte the number of teams is expanded, often to four or eight teams. these teams face off and the losing team in each match moves on to the next round, until the team that loses the finals of the tag team portion are forced to face off for either their mask or their hair.

The earliest recorded Rouleta de la Muerte was held on October 11, 1975 by at the Plaza de Toros Mexico in Mexico City. In the tournament As Charro and Gallo Tapado defeated Chicano Power and Sangre Fria, forcing them to unmask, as well as winning 40.000 Pesos. The Mexican professional wrestling promotion International Wrestling Revolution Group (IWRG; Sometimes referred to as Grupo Internacional Revolución in Spanish) held their first Ruleta de la Muerte tournament in 1998 as well, part of their Arena Naucalpan 21st Anniversary Show held on December 20, 1998 and saw the masked Mega defeat Judo Suwa, forcing the Japanese wrestler to be shaved bald as a result. In 2006 they held another Ruleta de la Muerte tournament, this time as part of their 2006. For this event the tournament format was slightly modified, using two first round matches where six wrestlers fought to stay out of the final Lucha de Apuestas match. In the end, the masked Coco Verde pinned Dr. Cerebro, forcing Dr. Cerebro to have all his hair shaved off. In 2009 IWRG held the 2009 Ruleta de la Muerte show, with the eponymous tournament as the focal point. In the finale, Gringo Loco defeated Chico Che after the team had lost two matches to get in the finals.

Starting as far back as 1998, IWRG has held several annual events where the main event was a multi-man steel cage match where the last wrestler left in the cage would be forced to either remove their wrestling mask or have their hair shaved off under Lucha de Apuestas, or "bet match", rules. This specific Ruleta de la Muerte cage match differed from other cage match shows by the fact that all four competitors were chained together at the beginning of the match, distinguishing this particular event from other Steel cage matches held throughout the year such as the IWRG Guerra del Golfo ("Gulf War"), IWRG El Castillo del Terror ("The Tower of Terror"), IWRG Guerra de Sexos ("War of the Sexes") or IWRG Prison Fatal ("Deadly Prison") shows. The Guerra del Golfo shows, as well as the majority of the IWRG shows in general, are held in "Arena Naucalpan", owned by the promoters of IWRG and their main arena.

For the April 2015 Ruleta de la Muerte show IWRG created their own variation on the Ruleta de la Muerte concept, closer to the types of matches often seen on their Prison Fatal shows. For this "Roulette of death" match IWRG put four wrestlers, Ricky Cruz, Eterno, Veneno and X-Fly, in a four-man steel cage match with the added challenge that all four were chained together. To escape the cage and keep their hair safe a wrestler would first have to get a key to unlock their chain, then climb out of the cage. The last man in the cage would have his hair shaved off.

=== Storylines ===
The event featured five professional wrestling matches with different wrestlers involved in pre-existing scripted feuds, plots and storylines. Wrestlers were portrayed as either heels (referred to as rudos in Mexico, those that portray the "bad guys") or faces (técnicos in Mexico, the "good guy" characters) as they followed a series of tension-building events, which culminated in a wrestling match or series of matches.

== Results ==
No.	Results	Stipulations
1	Aeroman and Alas de Acero defeated Insanity (Araña de Plata Jr. and Atomic Star)	Best two-out-of-three falls tag team match
2	Ashley and Lady Maravilla defeated Cristal and Vaneli	Best two-out-of-three falls tag team match
3	Los Tortugas Ninjas (Leo, Mike, Rafy and Teelo) defeated Ciclón Black, Tony Rivera and Los Oficiales (Oficial 911 and Oficial AK-47)	Best two-out-of-three falls eight-man "Lucha Libre rules" tag team match
4	Chicano, Danny Casas and Relámpago defeated Canis Lupus, El Hijo del Pirata Morgan and Negro Navarro	Best two-out-of-three falls six-man "Lucha Libre rules" tag team match
5	Ricky Cruz and Veneno and X-Fly defeated Eterno	Domo de la Muerte 4-man steel cage Luchas de Apuestas, hair vs. hair match
