= IWRG 8th Anniversary Show =

2004 International Wrestling Revolution Group event

- Promotion: International Wrestling Revolution Group
- Date: January 1, 2004
- City: Naucalpan, State of Mexico
- Venue: Arena Naucalpan

Event chronology
← Previous; Arena Naucalpan 26th Anniversary Show	Next → Rey del Ring

IWRG Anniversary Shows chronology
← Previous; 7th Anniversary	Next → 9th Anniversary

The IWRG 8th Anniversary Show was a major lucha libre event produced and scripted by the Mexican International Wrestling Revolution Group (IWRG) professional wrestling promotion on January 1, 2004. The show was held in Arena Naucalpan, Naucalpan, State of Mexico, which is IWRG's primary venue. As the name indicates the event commemorates the anniversary of IWRG, which was founded on January 1, 1996.

The main event match for the show was a best two-out-of-three-falls six-man tag team match with Consejo Mundial de Lucha Libre (CMLL) representatives Brazo de Plata and El Felino teaming up with IWRG mainstay Fantasy and El Felino as they defeated CMLL regular Scorpio Jr. and IWRG's Cerebro Negro and Mike Segura in a best two-out-of-three-falls six-man tag team match

== Production ==
=== Background ===
Wrestler-turned-promoter Adolfo "Pirata" Moreno began promoting wrestling shows in his native Naucalpan de Juárez, Mexico, bringing in wrestlers from Empresa Mexicana de Lucha Libre (EMLL) to Naucalpan as well as featuring wrestlers from the Mexican independent circuit. Later on he would promote shows mainly in "Arena KO Al Gusto" and served as the Universal Wrestling Association (UWA) partner, using the name Promociones Moreno as the business name for his promotional efforts. In 1977 Moreno bought the run down Arena KO Al Gusto and had Arena Naucalpan built in its place, an arena designed specifically for wrestling shows, with a maximum capacity of 2,400 spectators for the shows. Arena Naucalpan became the permanent home for Promociones Moreno, with very few shows held elsewhere.

In late 1995 Adolfo Moreno decided to create his own promotion, creating a regular roster instead of relying totally on wrestlers from other promotions, creating the International Wrestling Revolution Group (IWRG; sometimes referred to as Grupo Internacional Revolución in Spanish) on January 1, 1996. From that point on Arena Naucalpan became the main venue for IWRG, hosting the majority of their weekly shows and all of their major shows as well. The first IWRG Anniversary Show was held on January 1, 1997 with all subsequent shows being held on or right after January 1 each year, all at Arena Naucalpan.

=== Storylines ===
The event featured five professional wrestling matches with different wrestlers involved in pre-existing scripted feuds, plots and storylines. Wrestlers were portrayed as either heels (referred to as rudos in Mexico, those that portray the "bad guys") or faces (técnicos in Mexico, the "good guy" characters) as they followed a series of tension-building events, which culminated in a wrestling match or series of matches.

IWRG promoter Adolfo Moreno had been working closely with Consejo Mundial de Lucha Libre (CMLL) from the mid-1990s, booking CMLL wrestlers in Arena Naucalpan when they were not needed for CMLL shows. This practice continued after Moreno formed IWRG, bringing in CMLL wrestlers on a regular basis. For the eight anniversary show IWRG brought in CMLL wrestlers Brazo de Plata, El Felino and Scorpio Jr., with both Scorpio Jr. and El Felino being regulars in Naucalpan while Brazo de Plata was brought in specifically for the show.

== Event ==
In the first match of the night, rookie Chamaco Torres defeated Súper Cometa in a best two-out-of-three-falls match by winning the second and third fall of the match. For the second match of the night the tag team of masked wrestlers Paramédico and Zonik 2000 defeated Colt Master and Vampiro Metálico in a best two-out-of-three-falls tag team match For the third match of the night main eventer Brazo de Plata brought his sons and nephew to IWRG as Los Junior Brazos ("The Junior Arms"; Brazo de Oro Jr., Brazo de Plata Jr. and Brazo de Platino Jr.) took on and defeated the trio known as Los Comandos (Comando Alfa, Comando Delta and Comando Gama) in the first traditional lucha lubre best two-out-of-three-falls six-man tag team match. In the fourth match, El Fantasma Jr. and one of IWRG's most popular teams Los Megas (Mega and Ultra Mega) defeated El Hijo del Diablo, Rambo and El Veneno by disqualification when El Hijo del Diablo pulled the mask off one of Los Megas. For the main event Brazo de Plata, Fantasy and El Felino defeated Cerebro Negro, Mike Segura and Scorpio Jr., winning the second and third fall to take the match for the técnico team.

== Aftermath ==
The Los Brazos Junior trio that represented CMLL would later all abandoned their "Brazo" names and mask as their fathers (Brazo de Plata and Brazo de Oro) encouraged them to develop their own legacies instead of working in the shadows of their fathers. Brazo de Oro Jr. was the first to adopt a new identity, deciding to become La Máscara ("The Mask"), but still acknowledged that he was the son of Brazo de Oro. Brazo de Plata Jr. changed to be known as "Kronos" in 2005, but later adopted the ring character he would be best known under becoming known as "Psycho Clown", part of Los Psycho Circus. Brazo de Platino Jr., who is also a son of Brazo de Plata, not Brazo de Platino as the name would indicate, changed his name to Máximo not long after the IWRG 8th Anniversary Show, adopting an Exótico character.

Chamaco Torres, who worked in the opening match would later begin working for CMLL on a full-time basis, adopting the masked character "Artillero" (Spanish for "Gunner" or "Artilleryman"). In CMLL he was teamed up with his brother, known as Súper Comando to form a regular tag team known as Los Hombres del Camuflaje (Spanish for "Men In Camouflage").

== Results ==
No.	Results	Stipulations
1	Chamaco Torres defeated Súper Cometa	Best two-out-of-three-falls match
2	Paramédico and Zonik 2000 defeated Colt Master and Vampiro Metálico	Best two-out-of-three-falls tag team match
3	Los Junior Brazos (Brazo de Oro Jr., Brazo de Plata Jr. and Brazo de Platino Jr.) defeated Los Comandos (Comando Alfa, Comando Delta and Comando Gama)	Best two-out-of-three-falls six-man tag team match
4	El Fantasma Jr. and Los Megas (Mega and Ultra Mega) defeated El Hijo del Diablo, Rambo and El Veneno by disqualification	Best two-out-of-three-falls six-man tag team match
5	Brazo de Plata, Fantasy and El Felino defeated Cerebro Negro, Mike Segura and Scorpio Jr.	Best two-out-of-three-falls six-man tag team match
