= IWRG 7th Anniversary Show =

2003 International Wrestling Revolution Group event

- Promotion: International Wrestling Revolution Group
- Date: January 1, 2003
- City: Naucalpan, State of Mexico
- Venue: Arena Naucalpan

Event chronology
← Previous; Arena Naucalpan 25th Anniversary Show	Next → El Castillo del Terror

IWRG Anniversary Shows chronology
← Previous; 6th Anniversary	Next → 8th Anniversary

The IWRG 7th Anniversary Show was a major lucha libre event produced and scripted by the Mexican International Wrestling Revolution Group (IWRG) professional wrestling promotion on January 1, 2003. The show was held in Arena Naucalpan, Naucalpan, State of Mexico, which is IWRG's primary venue. As the name indicates the event commemorates the anniversary of IWRG, which was founded on January 1, 1996.

Due to incomplete records for many Mexican wrestling promotions in the 20th and early parts of the 21st century, only one match result has been verified. Magazines mentioned the main event match between Último Vampiro and Bombero Infernal, stating the date and the event it was held at. In the main event Último Vampiro defeated Bombero Infernal in a Lucha de Apuestas, or "bet match", forcing Bombero Infernal to have all his hair shaved off as a result. Due to incomplete record keeping, no other match results have been verified.

== Production ==
=== Background ===
Wrestler-turned-promoter Adolfo "Pirata" Moreno began promoting wrestling shows in his native Naucalpan de Juárez, Mexico, bringing in wrestlers from Empresa Mexicana de Lucha Libre (EMLL) to Naucalpan as well as featuring wrestlers from the Mexican independent circuit. Later on he would promote shows mainly in "Arena KO Al Gusto" and served as the Universal Wrestling Association (UWA) partner, using the name Promociones Moreno as the business name for his promotional efforts. In 1977 Moreno bought the run down Arena KO Al Gusto and had Arena Naucalpan built in its place, an arena designed specifically for wrestling shows, with a maximum capacity of 2,400 spectators for the shows. Arena Naucalpan became the permanent home for Promociones Moreno, with very few shows held elsewhere.

In late 1995 Adolfo Moreno decided to create his own promotion, creating a regular roster instead of relying totally on wrestlers from other promotions, creating the International Wrestling Revolution Group (IWRG; sometimes referred to as Grupo Internacional Revolución in Spanish) on January 1, 1996. From that point on Arena Naucalpan became the main venue for IWRG, hosting the majority of their weekly shows and all of their major shows as well. The first IWRG Anniversary Show was held on January 1, 1997 with all subsequent shows being held on or right after January 1 each year, all at Arena Naucalpan.

Records of the results of the first through the fourth IWRG Anniversary Show have not been found, partially because of minimal internet coverage of the Mexican independent circuit before the year 2000, partially because initially IWRG was one of many small promotions where the anniversary shows did not get a lot of press.

While online sources only identifies the January 1, 2001 show as an IWRG show, coverage of the Lucha de Apuestas records of Ultimo Vampiro defeated Bombero Infernal in 2008 identified that this match took place on the IWRG 7th Anniversary Show. The major Mexican lucha libre magazine Box y Lucha 2001 year in review coverage did not mention the show at all.

=== Storylines ===
The event featured an undetermined number professional wrestling matches with different wrestlers involved in pre-existing scripted feuds, plots and storylines. Wrestlers were portrayed as either heels (referred to as rudos in Mexico, those that portray the "bad guys") or faces (técnicos in Mexico, the "good guy" characters) as they followed a series of tension-building events, which culminated in a wrestling match or series of matches. While records are unclear on the average number of matches of the early IWRG anniversary shows later years' shows have consisted of an average of five matches, unless it was a special event such as the IWRG 15th Anniversary show that hosted the Guerra de Empresas ("War of the professional wrestling promotions") tournament.

IWRG had originally introduced Último Vampiro in the mid-to-late 1990s, but the wrestler under the mask gave up the role and moved on to using different names. In 1997 IWRG reintroduced the Último Vampiro with a third wrestler under the mask. In 2000 that wrestler was given a new character, "Super Mega" and IWRG introduced yet another Último Vampiro who only used the name for a short time before IWRG introduced the fifth version of Último Vampiro. That Último Vampiro would go on to win the IWRG Intercontinental Middleweight Championship a total of four times between March 25, 2001 and 2004. On January 24, 2002 Último Vampiro V lost the IWRG Intercontinental Middleweight Championship to Pantera in a match where Pantera and the third participant Pentagon both risked their masks on the outcome of the match while Último Vampiro V risked his championship. Último Vampiro won the first ever Rey del Ring ("King of the Ring") tournament on June 6, 2002 when he eliminated Bombero Infernal as the last participant in the 30-man elimination match. He would later defeat Tony Rivera to regain the middleweight championship but would lose it to Dr. Cerebro at some point in 2002.

In 1996 professional wrestler Guillermo Martinez began wrestling under the name "Bombero Infernal", complete with a mask and ring gear adorned in flames and diabolical images. He had only worked under that name for just over a year when he became involved in a storyline feud against El Pantera, the rivalry escalated to the point where both wrestlers agreed to put their masks on the line in a Lucha de Apuestas, or "bet match", the most prestigious match type in Lucha Libre. The match took place on December 7, 1997 in International Wrestling Revolution Group's (IWRG) Arena Naucalpan in Naucalpan, State of Mexico with Bombero Infernal losing the match, which forced him to unmask in the middle of the ring, state his birthname and how long he had been a wrestler. In 2001 Bombero Infernal started a storyline rivalry with Último Vampiro, as Bombero Infernal won the IWRG Intercontinental Middleweight Championship for a fourth time The match between the two ended in a controversial fashion, leading IWRG to take the championship away from Bombero Infernal only one week later as part of the escalating storyline between the two wrestlers.

== Event ==
In the main event, a Lucha de Apuestas, or "bet match", the masked Último Vampiro defeated the unmasked Bombero Infernal, forcing him to submit in the third and deciding fall. As a result, Bombero Infernal was forced to stand in the middle of the ring and have all his hair shaved off as per the lucha libre traditions of a Lucha de Apuestas match.

== Aftermath ==
The fifth Último Vampiro became the only version of the Último Vampiro character to lose a Luchas de Apuestas match and thus be forced to unmask, as he was defeated by Hijo de Anibal and had to unmask on March 13, 2003.

In 2003 IWRG decided to give Guillermo Martinez a new ring character, replacing the diabolical rudo character with "Matrix", a high flying, ultra colorful tecnico ("good guy") wrestling character designed to appeal to younger kids. During his time as Matrix he won the IWRG Intercontinental Middleweight Championship for a sixth time when he defeated Cerebro Negro. At the time it was not officially acknowledge that he was a six time champion since the previous five were won as "Bombero Infernal". On January 13, 2005 Matrix lost the championship to Veneno. Martinez kept working as Matrix on an irregular basis until he faced off against Fantastik in a Lucha de Apuestas match, the match was the first time ever the two had met and saw Matrix unmask and reveal his real identity. Following the reveal he abandoned the Matrix character. Martinez would later be instead repackaged as "Kraneo", teamed up with Cybog Cop and Xibalba to form La Escuadron de la Muerte ("The Squadron of Death") as they feuded with Los Oficiales (AK-47, Oficial 911 and Oficial Fierro). On July 19, 2007 La Escuadron defeated the trio of Mike Segura, Dr. Cerebro and Cerebro Negro to win the IWRG Intercontinental Trios Championship. The trio held the championship for 437 days until Los Oficiales won the belts on September 28, 2008. Not long after the title loss Martinez gave up the Kraneo character and instead became known as "Capitán Muerte" ("Captain Death"), another rudo character. He worked as Capitán Muerte until December 17, 2009 where he was unmasked when he lost the annual Prison Fatal steel cage match to Zathura and had to unmask. During his unmasking Martinez stated that he had been a professional wrestler for 8 years and not 21 years that was actually the case, possibly to try mask the fact that he was the former Bombero Infernal. In 2010 Guillermo Martinez returned to his "Bomero Infernal" ring name.

== Results ==
No.	Results	Stipulations
1	Último Vampiro defeated Bombero Infernal	Best two-out-of-three-falls Lucha de Apuestas, mask vs. hair match
