= IWRG Ruleta de la Muerte =

International Wrestling Revolution Group tournament

In Lucha libre, the Mexican version of professional wrestling, the Ruleta de la Muerte ("Roulette of Death") is a type of professional wrestling tournament where the loser or losers of a match would advance in the tournament instead of the winners. The finals of a Ruleta de la Muerte tournament featured the losing teams wrestle each other under Lucha de Apuestas, or "bet match" rules, where the loser would be forced to either unmask or have all their hair shaved off as a result. Various Mexican promotions have held Ruleta de la Muerte tournaments; some like International Wrestling Revolution Group (IWRG - sometimes referred to as Grupo Internacional Revolución in Mexico) have held these tournaments on a regular basis.

The first documented IWRG-promoted Ruleta de la Muerte tournament was held in 1998 with Mega defeating Judo Suwa, forcing Suwa to be shaved bald as a result. Since the first tournament, IWRG has held at least six additional Ruleta de la Muerte tournaments with a total of eight wrestlers being shaved bald as a result: Suwa, Dr. Cerebro, Chico Che, Temerario Infernal, Oficial AK-47, Bugambiglia, Eterno and X-Fly. While masked wrestlers have participated in the tournaments, none have lost their mask as a result. In 2009 IWRG began using the Ruleta de la Muerte as the name of the entire event as well and not just the tournament. Since 2009 IWRG has been held a total of six times, with the most recent being the 2019 Ruleta de la Muerte show.

== Event history ==
Mexican lucha libre, or professional wrestling, has a long-standing tradition around the wrestling mask and its role in both lucha libre and the culture of Mexico itself. In 1940 the Lucha de Apuestas, or "Bet match", was invented where a wrestler would either bet their mask or their hair (or on rare occasions their career) on the outcome of the match. If a masked wrestler lost the match he would be forced to remove his mask, state his given name and then never be allowed to wrestle with that mask on again. If an unmasked wrestler lost a Lucha de Apuestas he or she would be forced to have all his/her hair shaved off while standing in the middle of the ring, suffering the humiliation in front of everyone in attendance. Over time the Lucha de Apuestas matches became more prestigious than championship matches in Mexico and would often headline major shows. It's unclear exactly when the Rouleta de la Muerte (Spanish for "Roulette of Death"), some times also referred to as Ruleta Rusa (Russian Roulette), tournament concept was created. The concept of the tournament is similar to another lucha libre staple, the Parejas Suicidas ("Suicide Teams") or Relevos suicida ("Suicide Relays") match. In a Parejas Suicida, teams of two, often composed of rivals, have to wrestle against each other; the losing team is then forced to fight each other as "punishment" for losing the match. In a Ruleta de la Muerte the number of teams is expanded, often to four or eight teams. These teams face off and the losing team in each match moves on to the next round, until the team that loses the finals of the tag team portion are forced to face off for either their mask or their hair.

The earliest recorded Ruleta de la Muerte was held on October 11, 1975 at the Plaza de Toros Mexico in Mexico City. In the tournament As Charro and Gallo Tapado defeated Chicano Power and Sangre Fria, forcing them to unmask, as well as winning 40.000 Pesos. Consejo Mundial de Lucha Libre (CMLL), the world's oldest wrestling promotion, held a pair of high-profile Ruleta de la Muerte shows in 1998 and 1999. The 1998 show saw the team of Mr. Niebla and Black Warrior defeat the team of El Hijo del Santo and Guerrero del Futuro, forcing them to face off. In the end Guerrero del Futuro was forced to unmask. The 1999 tournament saw the team of Olímpico and Blue Panther defeat Shocker and Rey Bucanero, which led to Shocker defeating and unmasking Rey Bucanero.

IWRG held their first Ruleta de la Muerte tournament in 1998 as well, part of their Arena Naucalpan 21st Anniversary Show held on December 20, 1998, and saw the masked Mega defeat Judo Suwa, forcing the Japanese wrestler to be shaved bald as a result. In 2006 they held another Ruleta de la Muerte tournament, this time as part of their 2006. For this event the tournament format was slightly modified, using two first round matches where six wrestlers fought to stay out of the final Lucha de Apuestas match. In the end the masked Coco Verde pinned Dr. Cerebro, forcing Dr. Cerebro to have all his hair shaved off. In 2009 IWRG held the 2009 Ruleta de la Muerte show, with the eponymous tournament as the focal point. In the end Gringo Loco defeated Chico Che after the team had lost two matches to get in the finals. The 2012 Ruleta de la Muerte show ended with an unusual result as Temerario Infernal and Oficial AK-47 wrestled to a draw; as a result both men were shaved bald. After not holding a Ruleta de la Muerte show in 2014, IWRG held two shows under that name in 2015. The first Ruleta de la Muerte of 2015 saw a different type of Ruleta de la Muerte: instead of a tournament IWRG had a four-man steel cage match where all four of the competitors were chained together. To escape the cage a wrestler had to unlock the chain, then climb over the top of the cage to get out. The last man in the cage, in this case Eterno, had all his hair shaved off. The November version of La Ruleta de la Muerte was a traditional tournament, with Danny Casas defeating X-Fly in the finals.

== Ruleta de la Muerte tournament winners and losers ==
Year	Winner	Loser	Wager	Ref(s)
1998	Mega	Judo Suwa	Hair	
2006	Coco Verde	Dr. Cerebro	Hair	
2009	Gringo Loco	Chico Che	Hair	
2012	N/A	Temerario Infernal and Oficial AK-47 (draw)	Hair	
2013	La Sádica	Bugambilia	Hair	
2015 (April)	Mosco X-Fly	Eterno	Hair	
2015 (November)	Danny Casas	X-Fly	Hair	
2019	Ketzal	Gato Negro	Mask	
