= IWRG Ruleta de la Muerte (2012) =

2012 International Wrestling Revolution Group event

Ruleta de la Muerte (2012)
- Official poster for the event depicting all tournament participants
- Promotion: International Wrestling Revolution Group
- Date: September 6, 2012
- City: Naucalpan, State of Mexico
- Venue: Arena Naucalpan

Event chronology
← Previous; Caravana de Campeones	Next → El Castillo del Terror

IWRG Ruleta de la Muerte chronology
← Previous; 2009	Next → 2013

Ruleta de la Muerte (2012) (Spanish for "Roulette of death") was an annual professional wrestling major event produced and scripted by the Mexican professional wrestling promotion International Wrestling Revolution Group (IWRG), which took place on September 6, 2012 in Arena Naucalpan, Naucalpan, State of Mexico, Mexico. The focal point of the event was the eponymous Ruleta de la Muerte eight-man tournament where all participants put their wrestling mask or hair on the line. The Ruleta de la Muerte tournament is a Lucha libre stable, a tournament which unlike traditional tournaments it is the loser that advances in the tournament, advancing to the final that is contested under Luchas de Apuestas or bet rules.

The tournament participants were: Eterno (mask), Hijo de Máscara Año 2000 (mask), Hijo de Pirata Morgan (mask), Oficial AK-47 (hair), Súper Nova (mask), Temerario Infernal (hair), Trauma I (mask) and Veneno (hair). The show featured three other matches in addition to the eight tournament matches. The tournament finals between Temerario Infernal and Oficial AK-47 ended in a double pin, and as a result both wrestlers were shaved completely bald while still in the ring.

== Production ==
=== Background ===
Mexican lucha libre, or professional wrestling, has a long-standing tradition around the wrestling mask and its role in both lucha libre and the culture of Mexico itself. In 1940 the Lucha de Apuestas, or "Bet match", was invented where a wrestler would either bet their mask or their hair (or on rare occasions their career) on the outcome of the match. If a masked wrestler lost the match he would be forced to remove his mask, state his given name and then never be allowed to wrestle with that mask on again. If an unmasked wrestler lost a Lucha de Apuestas he or she would be forced to have all his/her hair shaved off while standing in the middle of the ring, suffering the humiliation in front of everyone in attendance. Over time the Lucha de Apuestas matches became more prestigious than championship matches in Mexico and would often headline major shows. It is unclear exactly when the Rouleta de la Muerte (Spanish for "Roulete of Death"), some times also referred to as Ruleta Rusa (Russian Roulette), tournament concept was created. The concept of the tournament is similar to another lucha libre staple the Parejas Suicidas ("Suicide Teams") or Relevos suicida ("Suicide Relays") match. in a Parejas Suicida teams of two, often composed of rivals, have to wrestle against each other, the losing team is then forced to fight each other as "punishment" for losing the match. In a Ruleta de la Muerte the number of teams is expanded, often to four or eight teams. these teams face off and the losing team in each match moves on to the next round, until the team that loses the finals of the tag team portion are forced to face off for either their mask or their hair.

The earliest recorded Rouleta de la Muerte was held on October 11, 1975 by at the Plaza de Toros Mexico in Mexico City. In the tournament As Charro and Gallo Tapado defeated Chicano Power and Sangre Fria, forcing them to unmask, as well as winning 40.000 Pesos. IWRG held their first Ruleta de la Muerte tournament in 1998 as well, part of their Arena Naucalpan 21st Anniversary Show held on December 20, 1998 and saw the masked Mega defeat Judo Suwa, forcing the Japanese wrestler to be shaved bald as a result. In 2006 they held another Ruleta de la Muerte tournament, this time as part of their 2006. For this event the tournament format was slightly modified, using two first round matches where six wrestlers fought to stay out of the final Lucha de Apuestas match. In the end, the masked Coco Verde pinned Dr. Cerebro, forcing Dr. Cerebro to have all his hair shaved off. In 2009 IWRG held the 2009 Ruleta de la Muerte show, with the eponymous tournament as the focal point. In the finale, Gringo Loco defeated Chico Che after the team had lost two matches to get in the finals.

=== Storylines ===
The event featured eleven professional wrestling matches with different wrestlers involved in pre-existing scripted feuds or storylines. Being a professional wrestling event matches are not won legitimately through athletic competition; they are instead won via predetermined outcomes to the matches that is kept secret from the general public.

== Event ==
During the second match of the night La Cobra began targeting Chicano, trying to get him to submit on more than one occasion. After Chicano, Carta Brava Jr. and Eita defeated La Cobra, Relámpago and Saruman, La Cobra challenged Chicano to defend the IWRG Intercontinental Lightweight Championship but Chicano did not accept the match at the time.

For the 2012 Ruleta de la Muerte tournament IWRG booked masked wrestlers Hijo de Pirata Morgan, Súper Nova and Trauma I alongside unmasked wrestlers Eterno, Hijo de Máscara Año 2000, Oficial AK-47, Temerario Infernal and Veneno for the eponymous Ruleta de la Muerte tournament. The eight-man tournament started out with a battle royal, used to determine the matches for the first round of the tournament. In the closing moments of the match Hijo de Pirata Morgan executed a Piledriver move on Oficial AK-47, with Oficial AK-47 looking like he got knocked unconscious as a result. Moments later El Hijo de Pirata Morgan was eliminated and thus the match was won by Súper Nova and Oficial AK-47, who as a result had to wrestle in the last first-round match, giving them the most time to rest.

In the first round Trauma I defeated Veneno, Eterno defeated Temerario Infernal and Hijo de Máscara Año 2000 defeated Hijo de Pirata Morgan by using a small steel chain on him, cheating his way to victory. In the final first round match Súper Nova dove out of the ring and hit Oficial AK-47 as he was making his way to the ring, a further flying move missed and instead Súper Nova struck the guardrail with his shoulder. Moments later Oficial AK-47 threw the referee into the crowd, drawing a disqualification. Súper Nova was taken to the back on a stretcher to have his shoulder examined. As a result, the four winners were out of the tournament, keeping their mask or hair safe. In the second round Veneno defeated Temerario Infernal to get out of the tournament. Oficial AK-47 has his tag team partner Oficial 911 at ringside for his match with El Hijo de Pirarata Morgan, with Oficial 911 trying to distract the referee throughout the match. In the closing moments of the match Oficial AK-47 used a piledriver move on El Hijo de Pirata Morgan, the same way Hijo de Pirata Morgan had done in the battle royal. In this case the referee saw the illegal move being used and disqualified Oficial AK-47, sending him to the finals of the tournament as a result.

Temerario Infernal and his corner-man Alan Extreme tried to rush Oficial AK-47 in the ring to get a quick win, but Oficial 911 made sure that did not happen. Throughout the match both corner-men interfered and at one point the referee was knocked out by accident. In the end both wrestler ended up in a pinning position, with both men's shoulders on the ground at the count of three. Both Oficial AK-47 and Temerario Infernal tried to get an additional fall to break the tie, but the referee ruled that his decision was final and that both wrestlers lost and had to have their hair shaved off as a result of the loss. This marked the first Ruleta de la Muerte tournament in IWRG that ended with both wrestlers having to be shaved bald.

== Results ==
No.	Results	Stipulations
1	Epidemia defeated Johnny Rivera	Singles match
2	Carta Brava, Jr., Chicano and Eita defeated La Cobra, Relámpago and Saruman	Best two-out-of-three falls six-man tag team match
3	Los Cerebros (Cerebro Negro and Dr. Cerebro) and Trauma II defeated Heddi Karaoui and Los Oficiales (Oficial 911 and Oficial Fierro)	Best two-out-of-three falls six-man tag team match
4	Oficial AK-47 and Súper Nova defeated Veneno, Eterno, Hijo de Máscara Año 2000, Trauma I, Temerario Infernal and Hijo de Pirata Morgan	Ruleta de la Muerte seeding Battle Royal
5	Trauma I defeated Veneno	2012 Ruleta de la Muerte quarter final match
6	Eterno defeated Temerario Infernal	2012 Ruleta de la Muerte quarter final match
7	Hijo de Máscara Año 2000 defeated Hijo de Pirata Morgan	2012 Ruleta de la Muerte quarter final match
8	Súper Nova defeated Oficial AK-47 by disqualification	2012 Ruleta de la Muerte quarter final match
9	Veneno defeated Temerario Infernal	2012 Ruleta de la Muerte semi-final match
10	Hijo de Pirata Morgan defeated Oficial AK-47 by disqualification	2012 Ruleta de la Muerte semi-final match
11	Temerario Infernal vs. Oficial AK-47 ended in a double-pin draw	2012 Ruleta de la Muerte final, Luchas de Apuestas, hair vs. hair match
