= Arena Naucalpan 25th Anniversary Show =

2002 International Wrestling Revolution Group event

- Promotion: International Wrestling Revolution Group
- Date: December 19, 2002
- City: Naucalpan, State of Mexico
- Venue: Arena Naucalpan

Event chronology
← Previous; El Castillo del Terror	Next → IWRG 7th Anniversary Show

Arena Naucalpan Anniversary Show chronology
← Previous; 24th Anniversary	Next → 26th Anniversary

The Arena Naucalpan 25th Anniversary Show was a major annual professional wrestling event produced and scripted by the Mexican professional wrestling promotion International Wrestling Revolution Group (IWRG), which took place on December 19, 1998 in Arena Naucalpan, Naucalpan, State of Mexico, Mexico. As the name implies the show celebrated the 25th anniversary of the construction of Arena Naucalpan, IWRG's main venue in 1977. The show is IWRG's longest-running show, predating IWRG being founded in 1996 and is the fourth oldest, still held, annual show in professional wrestling.

The only verified match of the show is the main event, a Lucha de Apuestas, or "bet match" between Hijo del Santo and Scorpio Jr. where Scorpio Jr. was forced to have all his hair shaved off as a result of his loss. The main event was a rematch from the Arena Naucalpan 22nd Anniversary Show where the two faced off for the "Millennium Cup" trophy. Due to incomplete record keeping, no other match results have been verified.

== Production ==
=== Background ===
The location at Calle Jardín 19, Naucalpan Centro, 53000 Naucalpan de Juárez, México, Mexico was originally an indoor roller rink for the locals in the late part of the 1950s known as "Cafe Algusto". By the early-1960s, the building was sold and turned into "Arena KO Al Gusto" and became a local lucha libre or professional wrestling arena, with a ring permanently set up in the center of the building. Promoter Adolfo Moreno began holding shows on a regular basis from the late 1960s, working with various Mexican promotions such as Empresa Mexicana de Lucha Libre (EMLL) to bring lucha libre to Naucalpan. By the mid-1970s the existing building was so run down that it was no longer suitable for hosting any events. Moreno bought the old build and had it demolished, building Arena Naucalpan on the same location, becoming the permanent home of Promociones Moreno. Arena Naucalpan opened its doors for the first lucha libre show on December 17, 1977. From that point on the arena hosted regular weekly shows for Promociones Moreno and also hosted EMLL and later Universal Wrestling Association (UWA) on a regular basis. In the 1990s the UWA folded and Promociones Moreno worked primarily with EMLL, now rebranded as Consejo Mundial de Lucha Libre (CMLL).

In late 1995 Adolfo Moreno decided to create his own promotion, creating a regular roster instead of relying totally on wrestlers from other promotions, creating the International Wrestling Revolution Group (IWRG; sometimes referred to as Grupo Internacional Revolución in Spanish) on January 1, 1996. From that point on Arena Naucalpan became the main venue for IWRG, hosting the majority of their weekly shows and all of their major shows as well. While IWRG was a fresh start for the Moreno promotion they kept the annual Arena Naucalpan Anniversary Show tradition alive, making it the only IWRG show series that actually preceded their foundation. The Arena Naucalpan Anniversary Show is the fourth oldest still ongoing annual show in professional wrestling, the only annual shows that older are the Consejo Mundial de Lucha Libre Anniversary Shows (started in 1934), the Arena Coliseo Anniversary Show (first held in 1943), and the Aniversario de Arena México (first held in 1957).=

Due to incomplete records for many Mexican wrestling promotions in the 20th and early parts of the 21st century only one match result has been verified. Magazines mentioned the match between El Hijo del Santo and Scorpio Jr., stating the date and the event it was held at, but does not mention any other results from the show. The Arena Naucalpan Anniversary Shows usually hosts on average five matches on each show.

=== Storylines ===
The event featured an undetermined number professional wrestling matches with different wrestlers involved in pre-existing scripted feuds, plots and storylines. Wrestlers were portrayed as either heels (referred to as rudos in Mexico, those that portray the "bad guys") or faces (técnicos in Mexico, the "good guy" characters) as they followed a series of tension-building events, which culminated in a wrestling match or series of matches.

Second generation wrestlers El Hijo del Santo (Son of El Santo) and Scorpio Jr. (Son of Scorpio) had been engaged in a long running rivalry, dating back to the mid-1990s when they both worked for Consejo Mundial de Lucha Libre (CMLL). The two started out as a regular trio, teaming up with Bestia Salvaje in 1996 and worked as a unit for several years. Together they participated in a tournament for the vacant CMLL World Trios Championship in 1997, but were eliminated by the team of Atlantis, Rayo de Jalisco Jr. and Lizmark. In 1998 El Hijo del Santo began teaming with former rival Negro Casas, turning to the tecnico side, forcing a split with Scorpio Jr. and Bestia Salvaje. El Hijo del Santo and Negro Casas defeated Bestia Salvaje and Scorpio Jr. by disqualification to win the CMLL World Tag Team Championship, but they refused to accept the championship as they did not win by pinfall. After their refusal of the title, the two teams faced a few weeks later, with Scorpio and Bestia Salvaje winning that match to reclaim the championship. The storyline between the two teams led to the main event of the 1999 Homenaje a Dos Leyendas: El Santo y Salvador Lutteroth ("Homage to two legends: El Santo and Salvador Lutteroth") show on March 19, 1999. In the main event El Santo and Scorpio Jr. both risked their masks while Negro Casas and Bestia Salvaje risked their hair in a tag team Lucha de Apuestas. In the end Casas and Hijo del Santo won, forcing Scorpio Jr. to remove his mask and state his birth name per lucha libre traditions. On April 2, 1999 El Hijo del Santo and Negro Casas won the championship by cleanly pinning Scorpio Jr. and Bestia Salvaje.

Due to CMLL's working arrangements with IWRG at the time both Scorpio Jr. and El Hijo del Santo would work IWRG events on occasion and found themselves on opposite sides of the main event of IWRG's Arena Naucalpan 22nd Anniversary Show, held on December 19, 1999 where El Hijo del Santo defeated Scorpio Jr. to win the Millennium Cup.

== Results ==
No.	Results	Stipulations
1	El Hijo del Santo defeated Scorpio Jr.	Best two-out-of-three-falls Lucha de Apuesta, mask vs, hair, matvh
