= Arena Naucalpan 30th Anniversary Show =

2007 International Wrestling Revolution Group event

- Promotion: International Wrestling Revolution Group
- Date: December 20, 2007
- City: Naucalpan, State of Mexico
- Venue: Arena Naucalpan

Event chronology
← Previous; El Castillo del Terror	Next → IWRG 11th Anniversary Show

Arena Naucalpan Anniversary Show chronology
← Previous; 29th Anniversary	Next → 31st Anniversary

The Arena Naucalpan 30th Anniversary Show was a major annual professional wrestling event produced and scripted by the Mexican professional wrestling promotion International Wrestling Revolution Group (IWRG), which took place on December 20, 2007 in Arena Naucalpan, Naucalpan, State of Mexico, Mexico. As the name implies the show celebrated the 30th Anniversary of the construction of Arena Naucalpan, IWRG's main venue in 1977. The show is IWRG's longest-running show, predating IWRG being founded in 1996 and is the fourth oldest, still held, annual show in professional wrestling.

The main event of the Arena Naucalpan 30th Anniversary Show was a best two-out-of-three-falls six-man tag team match where the team of Bogeman, El Hijo del Santo and El Pantera defeated Cerebro Negro, El Hijo del Cien Caras and Villano III. The show featured four additional matches, including a Mini-Estrellas match, a division that IWRG does not promote on a regular basis.

== Production ==
=== Background ===
The location at Calle Jardín 19, Naucalpan Centro, 53000 Naucalpan de Juárez, México, Mexico was originally an indoor roller rink for the locals in the late part of the 1950s known as "Cafe Algusto". By the early-1960s, the building was sold and turned into "Arena KO Al Gusto" and became a local lucha libre or professional wrestling arena, with a ring permanently set up in the center of the building. Promoter Adolfo Moreno began holding shows on a regular basis from the late 1960s, working with various Mexican promotions such as Empresa Mexicana de Lucha Libre (EMLL) to bring lucha libre to Naucalpan. By the mid-1970s the existing building was so run down that it was no longer suitable for hosting any events. Moreno bought the old build and had it demolished, building Arena Naucalpan on the same location, becoming the permanent home of Promociones Moreno. Arena Naucalpan opened its doors for the first lucha libre show on December 17, 1977. From that point on the arena hosted regular weekly shows for Promociones Moreno and also hosted EMLL and later Universal Wrestling Association (UWA) on a regular basis. In the 1990s the UWA folded and Promociones Moreno worked primarily with EMLL, now rebranded as Consejo Mundial de Lucha Libre (CMLL).

In late 1995 Adolfo Moreno decided to create his own promotion, creating a regular roster instead of relying totally on wrestlers from other promotions, creating the International Wrestling Revolution Group (IWRG; sometimes referred to as Grupo Internacional Revolución in Spanish) on January 1, 1996. From that point on Arena Naucalpan became the main venue for IWRG, hosting the majority of their weekly shows and all of their major shows as well. While IWRG was a fresh start for the Moreno promotion they kept the annual Arena Naucalpan Anniversary Show tradition alive, making it the only IWRG show series that actually preceded their foundation. The Arena Naucalpan Anniversary Show is the fourth oldest still ongoing annual show in professional wrestling, the only annual shows that older are the Consejo Mundial de Lucha Libre Anniversary Shows (started in 1934), the Arena Coliseo Anniversary Show (first held in 1943), and the Aniversario de Arena México (first held in 1957).=

=== Storylines ===
The event featured five professional wrestling matches with different wrestlers involved in pre-existing scripted feuds, plots and storylines. Wrestlers were portrayed as either heels (referred to as rudos in Mexico, those that portray the "bad guys") or faces (técnicos in Mexico, the "good guy" characters) as they followed a series of tension-building events, which culminated in a wrestling match or series of matches.

== Event ==
In the opening match, the Teenage Mutant Ninja Turtles inspired team Los Tortuguillos Ninja ("Literally the Ninja Turtles", two masked wrestlers dressed as their famous cartoon counterparts) defeated the team of Némesis and Rockero del Diablo. The recently introduced tag team Los Oficiales ("The Officials"; Oficial 911 and Oficial Fierro) was teamed up Puma King for a Best two-out-of-three-falls six-man tag team match against Puma King's brother Kid Tiger and Los Gemelos Fantastico ("The Fantastic Twins"; Gemelo Fantastico I and Gemelo Fantastico II), defeating Los Gemelos and Kid Tiger two falls to one.

The third match of the night featured six Mini-Estrellas ("Mini-Stars"), wrestlers of a shorter than average stature or in some cases Midget wrestlers working in a unique lucha libre division. IWRG usually did not promote the Mini-Estrellas on a regular basis, bringing them in only for special occasions. On the night the team of La Parkita ("Little La Parka"), Pequeño Kato ("Little Kato") and Voladorcito ("Little Volador) defeated Bracito de Plata ("Little Brazo de Plata"), Espectrito ("Little Espectro") and Pentagoncito ("Little Pentagón").

In the fourth match of the night IWRG regulars Freelance, Multifacético and El Veneno teamed up with Ultramán Jr. to wrestle against IWRG trainer Black Terry, who teamed up with Japanese wrestlers Kai, MAZADA and Yamato who had all come to Mexico for additional training. The match ended when the referee saw one of the Japanese wrestlers cheat, disqualifying them. The fitth and final match of the night featured the son of lucha libre legend El Santo, El Hijo del Santo teaming up with Bogeman and El Pantera to defeat Cerebro Negro and El Hijo del Cien Caras, who for the night was teaming up with Villano III in the loss.

== Results ==
No.	Results	Stipulations
1	Los Tortuguillos Ninja (Tortuguillo Ninja I and Tortuguillo Ninja II) defeated Némesis and Rockero del Diablo	Best two-out-of-three-falls tag team match
2	Puma King and Los Oficiales (Oficial 911 and Oficial Fierro) defeated Kid Tiger and Los Gemelos Fantastico (Gemelo Fantastico I and Gemelo Fantastico II)	Best two-out-of-three-falls six-man tag team match
3	La Parkita, Pequeño Kato and Voladorcito defeated Bracito de Plata, Espectrito and Pentagoncito	Best two-out-of-three-falls six-man tag team match
4	Freelance, Multifacético, Ultramán Jr. and El Veneno defeated Black Terry, Kai, MAZADA and Yamato by disqualification	Best two-out-of-three-falls six-man tag team match
5	Bogeman, El Hijo del Santo and El Pantera defeated Cerebro Negro, El Hijo del Cien Caras and Villano III	Best two-out-of-three -falls six-man tag team match
