= Arena Naucalpan 15th Anniversary Show =

1992 International Wrestling Revolution Group event

- Promotion(s): Promociones Moreno; Consejo Mundial de Lucha Libre
- Date: December 16, 1992
- City: Naucalpan, State of Mexico
- Venue: Arena Naucalpan

Arena Naucalpan Anniversary Show chronology
← Previous; 14th Anniversary	Next → 16th Anniversary

The Arena Naucalpan 15th Anniversary Show was a major annual professional wrestling event produced and scripted by Promociones Moreno in conjunction with the professional wrestling promotion Consejo Mundial de Lucha Libre (CMLL), which took place on December 16, 1992 in Arena Naucalpan, Naucalpan, State of Mexico, Mexico. As the name implies the show celebrated the 15th Anniversary of the construction of Arena Naucalpan, Promociones Morenos main venue, in 1977. In 1996 Promociones Moreno became International Wrestling Revolution Group (IWRG), maintaining the annual Arena Naucalpan Anniversary tradition. The show became IWRG's longest-running show and is the fourth oldest, still held annual show in professional wrestling.

The main event of the show featured Bestia Salvaje defending the CMLL World Middleweight Championship against former champion El Dandy in a Best two-out-of-three-falls match that saw El Dandy win the match and the championship. On the undercard El Hijo de Huracán Ramírez and Nuevo Huracán Ramírez Jr. won the Naucalpan Tag Team Championship as they defeated reigning champions Arkangel de la Muerte and Guerrero de la Muerte. The show featured three additional matches.

== Production ==
=== Background ===
The location at Calle Jardín 19, Naucalpan Centro, 53000 Naucalpan de Juárez, México, Mexico was originally an indoor roller rink for the locals in the late part of the 1950s known as "Cafe Algusto". By the early-1960s, the building was sold and turned into "Arena KO Al Gusto" and became a local lucha libre or professional wrestling arena, with a ring permanently set up in the center of the building. Promoter Adolfo Moreno began holding shows on a regular basis from the late 1960s, working with various Mexican promotions such as Empresa Mexicana de Lucha Libre (EMLL) to bring lucha libre to Naucalpan. By the mid-1970s the existing building was so run down that it was no longer suitable for hosting any events. Moreno bought the old build and had it demolished, building Arena Naucalpan on the same location, becoming the permanent home of Promociones Moreno. Arena Naucalpan opened its doors for the first lucha libre show on December 17, 1977. From that point on the arena hosted regular weekly shows for Promociones Moreno and also hosted EMLL and later Universal Wrestling Association (UWA) on a regular basis. In the 1990s the UWA folded and Promociones Moreno worked primarily with EMLL, now rebranded as Consejo Mundial de Lucha Libre (CMLL).

In late 1995 Adolfo Moreno decided to create his own promotion, creating a regular roster instead of relying totally on wrestlers from other promotions, creating the International Wrestling Revolution Group (IWRG; sometimes referred to as Grupo Internacional Revolución in Spanish) on January 1, 1996. From that point on Arena Naucalpan became the main venue for IWRG, hosting the majority of their weekly shows and all of their major shows as well. While IWRG was a fresh start for the Moreno promotion they kept the annual Arena Naucalpan Anniversary Show tradition alive, making it the only IWRG show series that actually preceded their foundation. The Arena Naucalpan Anniversary Show is the fourth oldest still ongoing annual show in professional wrestling, the only annual shows that older are the Consejo Mundial de Lucha Libre Anniversary Shows (started in 1934), the Arena Coliseo Anniversary Show (first held in 1943), and the Aniversario de Arena México (first held in 1957).

The Arena Naucalpan 15th Anniversary Show was organized by Alfonso Moreno and featured a large number of wrestlers from Consejo Mundial de Lucha Libre (CMLL), who allowed Moreno to book their wrestlers on a regular basis and in this case also sanctioned a match for the CMLL World Middleweight Championship.

=== Storylines ===
The event featured five professional wrestling matches with different wrestlers involved in pre-existing scripted feuds, plots and storylines. Wrestlers were portrayed as either heels (referred to as rudos in Mexico, those that portray the "bad guys") or faces (técnicos in Mexico, the "good guy" characters) as they followed a series of tension-building events, which culminated in a wrestling match or series of matches.

On September 4, 1992 Bestia Salvaje ended El Dandy's first reign as the CMLL World Middleweight Champion after 63 days. This was Bestia Salvaje's first reign as Middleweight Champion and the match against El Dandy would be the second time El Dandy had challenged Salvaje for the belt.

== Aftermath ==
After winning the CMLL World Middleweight Championship El Dandy would retain the championship for 147 days, defending it against Bestia Salvaje, Negro Casas and Mano Nega until he lost it to Emilio Charles Jr. on May 12, 1993. El Dandy regained the championship on October 15, 1993 to become a three-time champion.

The characters of El Hijo de Huracán Ramírez and Nuevo Huracán Ramírez Jr. only wrestled a handful of matches after making their debut at the anniversary show. It is unclear if the names were dropped due to not having the legal rights to use the name or if the two wrestlers under the masks decided they would rather work under names with less legacy than the "Huracán Ramírez" name. The Naucalpan Tag Team Championship was rarely mentioned since the title change in 1992, with the title being replaced by the IWRG Intercontinental Tag Team Championship by the year 2000.

== Results ==
No.	Results	Stipulations
1	Kundra defeated King Imperio	Best two-out-of-three-falls match
2	America, Cerebro and El Hijo del Solitario defeated Ciclón Ramírez, El Trueno and Tritón (Note: Not the same wrestler as the Tritón that made his CMLL debut in 2011.) by disqualification	Best two-out-of-three-falls six-man tag team match
3	El Hijo de Huracán Ramírez and Nuevo Huracán Ramírez Jr. defeated Arkangel de la Muerte and Guerrero de la Muerte (c)	Best two-out-of-three-falls tag team match for the Naucalpan Tag Team Championship
4	Atlantis, King Haku and Rayo de Jalisco Jr. defeated Emilio Charles Jr. and The Headhunters (Headhunter A and Headhunter B)	Best two-out-of-three-falls six-man tag team match
5	El Dandy defeated Bestia Salvaje (c)	Best two-out-of-three-falls match for the CMLL World Middleweight Championship
(c) / – the champion(s) heading into the match
