= Arena Naucalpan 27th Anniversary Show =

2004 International Wrestling Revolution Group event

- Promotion: International Wrestling Revolution Group
- Date: December 19, 2004
- City: Naucalpan, State of Mexico
- Venue: Arena Naucalpan

Event chronology
← Previous; El Castillo del Terror	Next → IWRG 9th Anniversary Show

Arena Naucalpan Anniversary Show chronology
← Previous; 26th Anniversary	Next → 28th Anniversary

The Arena Naucalpan 27th Anniversary Show was a major annual professional wrestling event produced and scripted by the Mexican professional wrestling promotion International Wrestling Revolution Group (IWRG), which took place on December 19, 2004 in Arena Naucalpan, Naucalpan, State of Mexico, Mexico. As the name implies the show celebrated the 27th Anniversary of the construction of Arena Naucalpan, IWRG's main venue in 1977. The show is IWRG's longest-running show, predating IWRG being founded in 1996 and is the fourth oldest, still held, annual show in professional wrestling.

In the main event Japanese wrestler MAZADA faced off against the Mexican Dr. Cerebro in a Lucha de Apuestas, or "bet match", where both wrestlers put their hair on the line in the match. The match saw MAZADA defeat Dr. Cerebro, two falls to one. The show included four additional matches and featured a mixture of IWRG and Consejo Mundial de Lucha Libre (CMLL) wrestlers.

== Production ==
=== Background ===
The location at Calle Jardín 19, Naucalpan Centro, 53000 Naucalpan de Juárez, México, Mexico was originally an indoor roller rink for the locals in the late part of the 1950s known as "Cafe Algusto". By the early-1960s, the building was sold and turned into "Arena KO Al Gusto" and became a local lucha libre or professional wrestling arena, with a ring permanently set up in the center of the building. Promoter Adolfo Moreno began holding shows on a regular basis from the late 1960s, working with various Mexican promotions such as Empresa Mexicana de Lucha Libre (EMLL) to bring lucha libre to Naucalpan. By the mid-1970s the existing building was so run down that it was no longer suitable for hosting any events. Moreno bought the old build and had it demolished, building Arena Naucalpan on the same location, becoming the permanent home of Promociones Moreno. Arena Naucalpan opened its doors for the first lucha libre show on December 17, 1977. From that point on the arena hosted regular weekly shows for Promociones Moreno and also hosted EMLL and later Universal Wrestling Association (UWA) on a regular basis. In the 1990s the UWA folded and Promociones Moreno worked primarily with EMLL, now rebranded as Consejo Mundial de Lucha Libre (CMLL).

In late 1995 Adolfo Moreno decided to create his own promotion, creating a regular roster instead of relying totally on wrestlers from other promotions, creating the International Wrestling Revolution Group (IWRG; sometimes referred to as Grupo Internacional Revolución in Spanish) on January 1, 1996. From that point on Arena Naucalpan became the main venue for IWRG, hosting the majority of their weekly shows and all of their major shows as well. While IWRG was a fresh start for the Moreno promotion they kept the annual Arena Naucalpan Anniversary Show tradition alive, making it the only IWRG show series that actually preceded their foundation. The Arena Naucalpan Anniversary Show is the fourth oldest still ongoing annual show in professional wrestling, the only annual shows that older are the Consejo Mundial de Lucha Libre Anniversary Shows (started in 1934), the Arena Coliseo Anniversary Show (first held in 1943), and the Aniversario de Arena México (first held in 1957).=

=== Storylines ===
The event featured five professional wrestling matches with different wrestlers involved in pre-existing scripted feuds, plots and storylines. Wrestlers were portrayed as either heels (referred to as rudos in Mexico, those that portray the "bad guys") or faces (técnicos in Mexico, the "good guy" characters) as they followed a series of tension-building events, which culminated in a wrestling match or series of matches.

Alejandro Jiménez Cruz began his wrestling career as the enmascarado or masked character Dr. Cerebro (Dr. Brains), wearing a mask that was decorated to look like his brain was exposed. On July 26, 1998 he won his first ever Lucha de Apuestas, or "bet match", as he defeated Oro Jr., forcing him to unmask as a result. On March 1, 2001 he himself lost his mask as he lost to El Hijo del Santo and was forced to unmask and state his real name. Subsequently, he won two Luchas de Apuestas matches against Black Terry and American Gigolo, in both cases forcing them to have their hair shaved off afterwards. Japanese wrestler MAZADA came to Japan in 2000 as part of a group of Toryumon working and training with IWRG. Since then Japanese wrestlers from Toryumon would make annual trips to Mexico. Between 2000 and 2003 MAZADA lost several Lucha de Apuestas matches, each time leaving the arena without any hair.

== Event ==
In the second match of the night the most recent IWRG "identical trio" Los Comandos (Comando Alfa, Comando Gama and Comando Mega) faced off against one of IWRG's longest established trios in Los Oficiales ("The Officials"; Cyborg, Guardia and Oficial). Los Comandos took the victory in the match, then made challenges to Los Megas once more, but they were not answered on the night.

In the main event of the Arena Naucalpan 27th Anniversary Show Dr. Cerebro and MAZADA split the first two falls between then rather quickly, going to the third, much longer fall as both wrestlers tried to defend their hair. In the end, Mazada pinned Dr. Cerebro, winning his first Lucha de Apuestas match, while forcing Dr. Cerebro to have his hair shaved off for the first time in the eight years since becoming a luchador.

== Results ==
No.	Results	Stipulations
1	Gato Felix and Mr. Black defeated Águila Oriental and Colt Master	Best two-out-of-three-falls tag team match
2	Los Comandos (Comando Alfa, Comando Gama and Comando Mega) defeated Los Oficiales (Cyborg, Guardia and Oficial)	Best two-out-of-three-falls six-man tag team match
3	Fabián el Gitano, Matrix and Tony Rivera defeated Cerebro Negro, Paramédico and El Veneno	Best two-out-of-three-falls six-man tag team match
4	El Felino, Máscara Sagrada and Villano III defeated Negro Casas, Negro Navarro and El Texano by disqualification	Best two-out-of-three-falls six-man tag team match
5	MAZADA defeated Dr. Cerebro	Best two-out-of-three-falls Lucha de Apuestas, hair vs. hair match
