= Arena Naucalpan 26th Anniversary Show =

2003 International Wrestling Revolution Group event

- Promotion: International Wrestling Revolution Group
- Date: December 21, 2003
- City: Naucalpan, State of Mexico
- Venue: Arena Naucalpan

Event chronology
← Previous; El Castillo del Terror	Next → IWRG 8th Anniversary Show

Arena Naucalpan Anniversary Show chronology
← Previous; 25th Anniversary	Next → 27th Anniversary

The Arena Naucalpan 26th Anniversary Show was a major annual professional wrestling event produced and scripted by the Mexican professional wrestling promotion International Wrestling Revolution Group (IWRG), which took place on December 21, 2003, in Arena Naucalpan, Naucalpan, State of Mexico, Mexico. As the name implies the show celebrated the 26th Anniversary of the construction of Arena Naucalpan, IWRG's main venue in 1977. The show is IWRG's longest-running show, predating IWRG being founded in 1996 and is the fourth oldest, still held annual show in professional wrestling.

In the main event of the anniversary show, long time rivals Cerebro Negro and Avisman I both put their hair on the line as they wrestled in a best two-out-of-three-falls Lucha de Apuestas, or "bet match". The match saw Cerebro Negro defeat his opponent, leaving Avisman I bald as a result. On the under-card several Consejo Mundial de Lucha Libre wrestlers appeared on the show, including El Dandy, Negro Casas, Perro Aguayo Jr. and Scorpio Jr. facing off in a Fatal four-way match.

== Production ==
=== Background ===
The location at Calle Jardín 19, Naucalpan Centro, 53000 Naucalpan de Juárez, México, Mexico was originally an indoor roller rink for the locals in the late part of the 1950s known as "Cafe Algusto". By the early-1960s, the building was sold and turned into "Arena KO Al Gusto" and became a local lucha libre or professional wrestling arena, with a ring permanently set up in the center of the building. Promoter Adolfo Moreno began holding shows on a regular basis from the late 1960s, working with various Mexican promotions such as Empresa Mexicana de Lucha Libre (EMLL) to bring lucha libre to Naucalpan. By the mid-1970s the existing building was so run down that it was no longer suitable for hosting any events. Moreno bought the old build and had it demolished, building Arena Naucalpan on the same location, becoming the permanent home of Promociones Moreno. Arena Naucalpan opened its doors for the first lucha libre show on December 17, 1977. From that point on the arena hosted regular weekly shows for Promociones Moreno and also hosted EMLL and later Universal Wrestling Association (UWA) on a regular basis. In the 1990s the UWA folded and Promociones Moreno worked primarily with EMLL, now rebranded as Consejo Mundial de Lucha Libre (CMLL).

In late 1995 Adolfo Moreno decided to create his own promotion, creating a regular roster instead of relying totally on wrestlers from other promotions, creating the International Wrestling Revolution Group (IWRG; sometimes referred to as Grupo Internacional Revolución in Spanish) on January 1, 1996. From that point on Arena Naucalpan became the main venue for IWRG, hosting the majority of their weekly shows and all of their major shows as well. While IWRG was a fresh start for the Moreno promotion they kept the annual Arena Naucalpan Anniversary Show tradition alive, making it the only IWRG show series that actually preceded their foundation. The Arena Naucalpan Anniversary Show is the fourth oldest still ongoing annual show in professional wrestling, the only annual shows that older are the Consejo Mundial de Lucha Libre Anniversary Shows (started in 1934), the Arena Coliseo Anniversary Show (first held in 1943), and the Aniversario de Arena México (first held in 1957).=

=== Storylines ===
The event featured five professional wrestling matches with different wrestlers involved in pre-existing scripted feuds, plots and storylines. Wrestlers were portrayed as either heels (referred to as rudos in Mexico, those that portray the "bad guys") or faces (técnicos in Mexico, the "good guy" characters) as they followed a series of tension-building events, which culminated in a wrestling match or series of matches.

== Event ==
In the second match of the night Consejo Mundial de Lucha Libre (CMLL) representatives Los Brazos Junior ("The Junior Arms"; Brazo de Oro Jr. ("Gold Arm Jr."), Brazo de Plata Jr. ("Silver Arm Jr.") and Brazo de Platino Jr. ("Platinum Arm Jr.")) defeated IWRG representatives Angel de Tijuana and Los Megas (Mega and Ultra Mega) in a Best two-out-of-three falls six-man tag team match. The third match of the night was a singles best two-out-of-three-falls match between IWRG regulars Mike Segura and Mike Segura defeated Fantasy, a rematch from their Lucha de Apuestas, or "bet match" from late 2003. On this occasion Segura gained a measure of revenge after being shaved bald the previous year as he pinned Fantasy to win the third and final fall. The main event Lucha de Apuetas match between Avisman I and Cerebro Negro ended with Avisman I shaved bald, his first Lucha de Apuestas loss in his career.

== Aftermath ==
The Los Brazos Junior trio that represented CMLL would later all abandoned their "Brazo" names and mask as their fathers (Brazo de Plata and Brazo de Oro) encouraged them to develop their own legacies instead of working in the shadows of their fathers. Brazo de Oro Jr. was the first to adopt a new identity, deciding to become La Máscara ("The Mask"), but still acknowledged that he was the son of Brazo de Oro. Brazo de Plata Jr. changed to be known as "Kronos" in 2005, but later adopted the ring character he would be best known under becoming known as "Psycho Clown", part of Los Psycho Circus. Brazo de Platino Jr., who is also a son of Brazo de Plata, not Brazo de Platino as the name would indicate, changed his name to Máximo not long after the Arena Naucalpan 26th Anniversary Show, adopting an Exótico character.

== Results ==
No.	Results	Stipulations
1	Paramedico and Zonik 2000 defeated Marco Rivera and Star	Best two-out-of-three-falls tag team match
2	Los Brazos Junior (Brazo de Oro Jr., Brazo de Plata Jr. and Brazo de Platino Jr. defeated Angel de Tijuana and Los Megas (Mega and Ultra Mega)	Best two-out-of-three falls six-man tag team match
3	Mike Segura defeated Fantasy	Best two-out-of-three-falls match
4	El Dandy defeated Negro Casas, Perro Aguayo Jr. and Scorpio Jr.	Fatal four-way match
5	Cerebro Negro defeated Avisman I	Best two-out-of-three-falls Lucha de Apuestas, hair vs. hair match
