= IWRG Ruleta de la Muerte (November 2015) =

2015 International Wrestling Revolution Group event

Ruleta de la Muerte (November 2015)
- Promotion: International Wrestling Revolution Group
- Date: November 29, 2015
- City: Naucalpan, State of Mexico
- Venue: Arena Naucalpan

Event chronology
← Previous; El Castillo del Terror	Next → 53rd Anniversary of Lucha Libre in Estado de Mexico

Ruleta de la Muerte chronology
← Previous; April 2015	Next → —

The Mexican professional wrestling promotion International Wrestling Revolution Group (IWRG; Sometimes referred to as Grupo Internacional Revolución in Mexico) produced and scripted a Ruleta de la Muerte (Spanish for "Roulette of Death") tournament on November 29, 2015. The show took place in Arena Naucalpan, in Naucalpan, State of Mexico, Mexico, IWRG's main venue and the site of the majority of all their major shows and tournaments.

The lucha libre concept of a Ruleta de la Muerte tournament sees tag teams battle it out, with the losing team in the match advancing in the tournament. The team to lose the last tag team match will then be forced to wrestle each other under Lucha de Apuestas, or "bet match" rules, in this case putting their hair on the list. The team of Danny Casas and X-Fly lost to Diva Salvaje and Toscano and had to wrestle each other. Casas won the match, leaving X-Fly bald as a result.

== Production ==
=== Background ===
In Lucha libre, the Mexican version of professional wrestling the Ruleta de la Muerte ("Roulette of Death") is a type of Professional wrestling tournament where the loser or losers of a match would advance in the tournament instead of the winners. The finals of a Ruleta de la Muerte tournament featured the losing team wrestle each other under Lucha de Apuestas, or "bet match" rules, where the loser would be forced to either unmask or have all their hair shaved off as a result. Various Mexican promotions have held Ruleta de la Muerte tournaments, some like International Wrestling Revolution Group (IWRG; Sometimes referred to as Grupo Internacional Revolución in Mexico) has held these tournaments on a regular basis. The earliest such tournament was in 1998 part of the Arena Naucalpan 21st Anniversary Show and saw Mega defeat Judo Suwa, forcing the Japanese wrestler to have his hair shaved off. Most of the Ruleta de la Muerte tournaments have followed the traditional lucha libre format, except for the April 2015 Ruleta de la Muerte show, where it instead was a four-man steel cage match instead.

=== Storylines ===
The event featured nine professional wrestling matches with different wrestlers involved in pre-existing scripted feuds, plots and storylines. Wrestlers were portrayed as either heels (referred to as rudos in Mexico, those that portray the "bad guys") or faces (técnicos in Mexico, the "good guy" characters) as they followed a series of tension-building events, which culminated in a wrestling match or series of matches.

== Event ==
During the undercard match between the técnico team of Pantera, Relámpago and Súper Nova had problems getting along as they fought Diablo Jr. I, El Hijo del Diablo and Violencia Jr. In the end, Relámpago turned on his partner Súper Nova, turning to the rudo side as he attacked Súper Nova.

The eight wrestlers in the Ruleta de la Muerte tournament started out by competing in a battle royal to determine the first round match up. The first two teams eliminated would face off first and the remaining two teams would then wrestle in the second match. The match ended as Diva Salvaje Máscara Año 2000 Jr., Toscano and Veneno were eliminated, leaving Trauma I, Trauma II, Danny Casas and X-Fly as the winners. In the first tag team match of the tournament Toscano and Diva Salvaje lost to the team of Veneno and Máscara Año 2000 Jr. In the second team Los Traumas (Trauma I and II) used their experience as a tag team to defeat Casas and Toscano, forcing both losing teams to advance to the second round. During the match against Los Traumas X-Fly began to bleed profusely from his forehead, with the storyline being that he was so injured that Danny Casas was basically forced to face Toscano and Diva Salvaje on his own. The two-on-one advantage meant that Toscano and Diva Salvaje won the match and escaped the tournament. While being unable to compete in the tag team match X-Fly attacked Casas from behind, trying to gain the advantage but in the end Danny Casas pinned X-Fly to win the match. As he was getting shaved bald X-Fly stated that he was considering retirement after having lost the Luchas de Apuestas match.

== Aftermath ==
While Danny Casas and Toscano were on opposite sides during the Ruleta de la Muerte the two teamed up on subsequent shows without issues. The two were teamed for a match on the Arena Naucalpan 38th Anniversary Show where they Tortuga Rafy and Veneno lost to the team of Máscara Año 2000 Jr., Negro Navarro, Pirata Morgan and Trauma II. After the loss Toscano blamed Danny Casas for the loss, pushing him out of the way as he left the ring. A week after the Anniversary show Toscano challenged Danny Casas to a singles match, which the veteran wrestler Toscano won by bending the rules. Following hs victory Toscano challenged Danny Casas to a Lucha de Apuestas, or "bet match", with both wrestlers putting their hair on the line. The Lucha de Apuestas match between the two was the main event of the IWRG 20th Anniversary Show. During the match, Toscano played the rudo part throughout the match, although all three falls ended cleanly. In the end, Danny Casas pinned Toscano to win the third and deciding fall. As a result, Toscano had all his hair shaved off while in the middle of the ring. Afterward, he shook Danny Casas' hand and walked off. The storyline between Casas and Toscano ended at the anniversary show, the two faced off during the preliminary round of the 2016 El Protector tournament but showed no signs of animosity.

Even though X-Fly talked about retirement after his hair loss, he remained an active competitor, working IWRG's 2016 El Protector tournament among many of his subsequent in-ring appearances.

== Results ==
No.	Results	Stipulations
1	Fireman and Rocket Rojo defeated Adrenalina and Atomic Star	Best two-out-of-three-falls tag team match
2	Avisman, Imposible and Vortize defeated Dinamic Black, Látigo and Pantera I	Best two-out-of-three-falls six-man tag team match
3	Los Insoportables (Apolo Estrada Jr., Canis Lupus and Eterno) defeated El Hijo del Pantera and Los Terribles Cerebros (Black Terry and Dr. Cerebro)	Best two-out-of-three-falls six-man tag team match
4	Diablo Jr. I, El Hijo del Diablo and Violencia Jr. defeated Pantera, Relámpago and Súper Nova	Best two-out-of-three-falls six-man tag team match
5	Danny Casas, Trauma I, Trauma II and X-Fly defeated Diva Salvaje, Máscara Año 2000 Jr., Toscano and Veneno	Ruleta de la Muerte seeding battle royal
6	Los Traumas (Trauma I and Trauma II) defeated Danny Casas and X-Fly	Ruleta de la Muerte quarter-final tag team match
7	Máscara Año 2000 Jr. and Veneno defeated Diva Salvaje and Toscano	Ruleta de la Muerte quarter-final tag team match
8	Diva Salvaje and Toscano defeated Danny Casas and X-Fly	Ruleta de la Muerte semi-final tag team match
9	Danny Casas defeated X-Fly	Ruleta de la Muerte finals, Lucha de Apuestas hair vs. hair match
