= Arena Naucalpan 31st Anniversary Show =

2008 International Wrestling Revolution Group event

- Promotion: International Wrestling Revolution Group
- Date: December 19, 2008
- City: Naucalpan, State of Mexico
- Venue: Arena Naucalpan

Event chronology
| ← Previous; El Castillo del Terror | Next → El Castillo del Terror |

Arena Naucalpan Anniversary Show chronology
| ← Previous; 30th Anniversary | Next → 32nd Anniversary |

The Arena Naucalpan 31st Anniversary Show was a major annual professional wrestling event produced and scripted by the Mexican professional wrestling promotion International Wrestling Revolution Group (IWRG), which took place on December 19, 2008 in Arena Naucalpan, Naucalpan, State of Mexico, Mexico. As the name implies the show celebrated the 31st Anniversary of the construction of Arena Naucalpan, IWRG's main venue in 1977. The show is IWRG's longest-running show, predating IWRG being founded in 1996 and is the fourth oldest, still held annual show in professional wrestling.

Only two of the matches on the show has been confirmed, with a main event best two-out-of-three-falls tag team match for the IWRG Intercontinental Tag Team Championship. The team known as Los Junior Dinamitas ("The Junior Dynamites"; El Hijo del Cien Caras and Máscara Año 2000 Jr.) successfully defended the championship against Los Guapos ("The Hansome Ones"; Scorpio Jr. and Zumbido). The other confirmed match saw Los Oficiales ("The Officials"'; Oficial 911, Oficial AK-47 and Oficial Fierro) defeat the trio of Freelance, Jack and Zatura.

== Production ==
=== Background ===
The location at Calle Jardín 19, Naucalpan Centro, 53000 Naucalpan de Juárez, México, Mexico was originally an indoor roller rink for the locals in the late part of the 1950s known as "Cafe Algusto". By the early-1960s, the building was sold and turned into "Arena KO Al Gusto" and became a local lucha libre or professional wrestling arena, with a ring permanently set up in the center of the building. Promoter Adolfo Moreno began holding shows on a regular basis from the late 1960s, working with various Mexican promotions such as Empresa Mexicana de Lucha Libre (EMLL) to bring lucha libre to Naucalpan. By the mid-1970s the existing building was so run down that it was no longer suitable for hosting any events. Moreno bought the old build and had it demolished, building Arena Naucalpan on the same location, becoming the permanent home of Promociones Moreno. Arena Naucalpan opened its doors for the first lucha libre show on December 17, 1977. From that point on the arena hosted regular weekly shows for Promociones Moreno and also hosted EMLL and later Universal Wrestling Association (UWA) on a regular basis. In the 1990s the UWA folded and Promociones Moreno worked primarily with EMLL, now rebranded as Consejo Mundial de Lucha Libre (CMLL).

In late 1995 Adolfo Moreno decided to create his own promotion, creating a regular roster instead of relying totally on wrestlers from other promotions, creating the International Wrestling Revolution Group (IWRG; sometimes referred to as Grupo Internacional Revolución in Spanish) on January 1, 1996. From that point on Arena Naucalpan became the main venue for IWRG, hosting the majority of their weekly shows and all of their major shows as well. While IWRG was a fresh start for the Moreno promotion they kept the annual Arena Naucalpan Anniversary Show tradition alive, making it the only IWRG show series that actually preceded their foundation. The Arena Naucalpan Anniversary Show is the fourth oldest still ongoing annual show in professional wrestling, the only annual shows that older are the Consejo Mundial de Lucha Libre Anniversary Shows (started in 1934), the Arena Coliseo Anniversary Show (first held in 1943), and the Aniversario de Arena México (first held in 1957).=

Due to incomplete records for many Mexican wrestling promotions in the 20th and early parts of the 21st century only two match result has been verified s being reported by print media. The Arena Naucalpan Anniversary Shows usually hosts on average five matches on each show.

=== Storylines ===
The event featured an undetermined number professional wrestling matches with different wrestlers involved in pre-existing scripted feuds, plots and storylines. Wrestlers were portrayed as either heels (referred to as rudos in Mexico, those that portray the "bad guys") or faces (técnicos in Mexico, the "good guy" characters) as they followed a series of tension-building events, which culminated in a wrestling match or series of matches.

In the spring of 2008 Scorpio Jr., Zumbido, collectively known as Los Guapos left AAA, citing their displeasure over the work they were given. Los Guapos ended up working for IWRG on a regular basis and even saw Scorpio Jr. winning the 2008 Rey del Ring ("King of the Ring") tournament on July 28, 2008.

The team known as Los Junior Dinamitas ("The Junior Dynamites"), consisting of El Hijo del Cien Caras and Máscara Año 2000 Jr. began working for IWRG in 2007. While their ring characters were portrayed as the sons of Cien Caras and Máscara Año 2000, neither were actually related. It is not uncommon in lucha libre for wrestlers to pay for the rights to the name of a well known wrestler, becoming a "hijo de" ("son of") or a junior in storyline terms. Los Junior Dinamitas defeated El Felino and Pantera to win the IWRG Intercontinental Tag Team Championship on May 31, 2007 and embarked on a long title reign. Over the subsequent 18 months Los Junior Dinamitas successfully defended the championship against teams such as Electroshock and El Hijo del Aníbal, Pierroth and El Hijo del Pierroth, El Hijo de Solitario and El Hijo de Aníbal, Heavy Metal and Negro Casas, Rayo de Jalisco Jr. and El Hijo de Aníbal, Dr. Wagner Jr. and Silver King, Silver King and El Dandy, Fantasma and Fantasma Jr. and finally Arlequín and El Hijo del Pierroth prior to the Arena Naucalpan 31st Anniversary Show.

== Aftermath ==
Los Junior Dinamitas continued their long-lasting run as the IWRG Intercontinental Tag Team Champions into 2009, defending against The Headhunters on March 15, 2009. Their reign was ended on August 9, 2009 as they lost to Scorpio Jr. and Ricky Cruzz.

== Results ==
| No. | Results | Stipulations | Times |
|---|---|---|---|
| 1 | Los Oficiales (Oficial 911, Oficial AK-47 and Oficial Fierro) defeated Freelance, Jack and Zatura | Best two-out-of-three falls six-man tag team match | 20:45 |
| 2 | Los Junior Dinamitas (El Hijo del Cien Caras and Máscara Año 2000 Jr.) (c) defeated Los Guapos (Scorpio Jr. and Zumbido) | Best two-out-of-three-falls tag team match for the IWRG Intercontinental Tag Team Championship | 17:41 |
(c) / – the champion(s) heading into the match
