= Arena Naucalpan 32nd Anniversary Show =

2009 International Wrestling Revolution Group event

- Promotion: International Wrestling Revolution Group
- Date: December 17, 2009
- City: Naucalpan, State of Mexico
- Venue: Arena Naucalpan

Event chronology
← Previous; 35 Años de Rayo de Jalisco Jr.	Next → Proyeccion a Nuevas Promesas

Arena Naucalpan Anniversary Show chronology
← Previous; 31st Anniversary	Next → 33rd Anniversary

The Arena Naucalpan 32nd Anniversary Show was a major annual professional wrestling event produced and scripted by the Mexican professional wrestling promotion International Wrestling Revolution Group (IWRG), which took place on December 17, 2009 in Arena Naucalpan, Naucalpan, State of Mexico, Mexico. As the name implies the show celebrated the 32nd Anniversary of the construction of Arena Naucalpan, IWRG's main venue in 1977. The show is IWRG's longest-running show, predating IWRG being founded in 1996 and is the fourth oldest, still held, annual show in professional wrestling. The show was also promoted under the name Prison Fatal ("Deadly Prison"), a name first used for the 2000 Prison Fatal show.

The main event of the show was a ten-man steel cage match fought under Lucha de Apuestas, or "bet match", rules where the last man in the cage would be forced to unmask or have their hair shaved off if they were unmasked. The steel cage match saw Exodia, Fantasma de la Ópera, El Hijo de Pirata Morgan, Péndulo, Tóxico, Trauma I, Ultramán Jr. and Xibalba all leave the cage. In the end, Zatura pinned Capitán Muerte, forcing Capitán Muerte to umask and reveal his real name, Guillermo Martinez Cid.

== Production ==
=== Background ===
The location at Calle Jardín 19, Naucalpan Centro, 53000 Naucalpan de Juárez, México, Mexico was originally an indoor roller rink for the locals in the late part of the 1950s known as "Cafe Algusto". By the early-1960s, the building was sold and turned into "Arena KO Al Gusto" and became a local lucha libre or professional wrestling arena, with a ring permanently set up in the center of the building. Promoter Adolfo Moreno began holding shows on a regular basis from the late 1960s, working with various Mexican promotions such as Empresa Mexicana de Lucha Libre (EMLL) to bring lucha libre to Naucalpan. By the mid-1970s the existing building was so run down that it was no longer suitable for hosting any events. Moreno bought the old build and had it demolished, building Arena Naucalpan on the same location, becoming the permanent home of Promociones Moreno. Arena Naucalpan opened its doors for the first lucha libre show on December 17, 1977. From that point on the arena hosted regular weekly shows for Promociones Moreno and also hosted EMLL and later Universal Wrestling Association (UWA) on a regular basis. In the 1990s the UWA folded and Promociones Moreno worked primarily with EMLL, now rebranded as Consejo Mundial de Lucha Libre (CMLL).

In late 1995 Adolfo Moreno decided to create his own promotion, creating a regular roster instead of relying totally on wrestlers from other promotions, creating the International Wrestling Revolution Group (IWRG; sometimes referred to as Grupo Internacional Revolución in Spanish) on January 1, 1996. From that point on Arena Naucalpan became the main venue for IWRG, hosting the majority of their weekly shows and all of their major shows as well. While IWRG was a fresh start for the Moreno promotion they kept the annual Arena Naucalpan Anniversary Show tradition alive, making it the only IWRG show series that actually preceded their foundation. The Arena Naucalpan Anniversary Show is the fourth oldest still ongoing annual show in professional wrestling, the only annual shows that older are the Consejo Mundial de Lucha Libre Anniversary Shows (started in 1934), the Arena Coliseo Anniversary Show (first held in 1943), and the Aniversario de Arena México (first held in 1957).=

IWRG has a long-standing history of holding major event focused on a multi-man steel cage match where the last wrestler left in the cage would be forced to either remove their wrestling mask or have their hair shaved off under Lucha de Apuestas, or "bet match", rules. The first confirmed Lucha de Apuestas steel cage match took place in 1997, during the first year of IWRG's existence. Starting in 200 IWRG has on occasion promoted a variation of the steel cage match under the moniker Prison Fatal ("Deadly Prison"). The Prison Fatal name predates other IWRG steel cage match shows held by IWRG throughout the year, such as the IWRG Guerra del Golfo ("Gulf War"), IWRG Guerra de Sexos ("War of the Sexes"), or IWRG El Castillo del Terror ("The Tower of Terror") shows. While the event itself was promoted as the "Arena Naucalpan 32nd Anniversary Show" the main event match itself was billed as La Prison Fatal.

=== Storylines ===
The event featured four professional wrestling matches with different wrestlers involved in pre-existing scripted feuds, plots and storylines. Wrestlers were portrayed as either heels (referred to as rudos in Mexico, those that portray the "bad guys") or faces (técnicos in Mexico, the "good guy" characters) as they followed a series of tension-building events, which culminated in a wrestling match or series of matches.

== Event ==
After unmasking Capitán Muerte revealed that his real name was Guillermo Martinez Cid, and claimed that he had been a wrestler for eight years. It was later confirmed that Martinez Cid had actually been a professional wrestler for 21 years and had formerly worked for IWRG as "Bombero Infernal". He later resumed working for IWRG as Bombero Infernal. Zatura remained with IWRG through 2010 before disappearing, possibly because he was given a new ring identity. In 2016 Zatura, or someone using the same name and mask returned to IWRG.

== Results ==
No.	Results	Stipulations	Times
1	Chico Che and Eragon defeated Los Arlequíns (Arlequín Amarillo and Arlequín Rojo)	Best two-out-of-three-falls tag team match	13:40
2	Los Gringos VIP (Avisman and El Gringo Loco) defeated Tetsuya Bushi and Freelance	Best two-out-of-three-falls tag team match	15:13
3	Los Cerebros Terribles (Black Terry, Cerebro Negro and Dr. Cerebro) defeated Los Oficiales (Oficial 911, Oficial AK-47 and Oficial Fierro)	La Copa "Adolfo Pirata Moreno"	16:05
4	Zatura defeated Capitán Muerte; Also in the match: Exodia, Fantasma de la Ópera, El Hijo de Pirata Morgan, Péndulo, Tóxico, Trauma I, Ultramán Jr. and Xibalba	Prison Fatal 10-man Lucha de Apuestas, mask or hair, steel cage match	25:44
