= Arena Naucalpan 33rd Anniversary Show =

2010 International Wrestling Revolution Group event

- Official poster depicting Chris Stone, Hernandez, Silver Cain, Dr. Wagner, Jr., Electroshock and Máscara Año 2000, Jr.
- Promotion: International Wrestling Revolution Group
- Date: December 16, 2010
- City: Naucalpan, State of Mexico
- Venue: Arena Naucalpan

Event chronology
← Previous; Tribute to El Hijo de Cien Caras	Next → Guerra de Empresas/IWRG 15th Anniversary Show

Arena Naucalpan Anniversary Shows chronology
← Previous; 32nd Anniversary	Next → 34th Anniversary

The Arena Naucalpan 33rd Anniversary Show was an annual professional wrestling major event produced by Mexican professional wrestling promotion International Wrestling Revolution Group (IWRG), which took place on December 16, 2010 in Arena Naucalpan, Naucalpan, State of Mexico, Mexico. The show celebrated the 34th Anniversary of the construction of Arena Naucalpann, IWRG's main venue, in December 1977. From 1977 until 1996 the arena was affiliated with various promotions such as Universal Wrestling Association (UWA) and Consejo Mundial de Lucha Libre (CMLL) but in 1996 arena owner and wrestling promoter Adolfo Moreno created his own promotion, IWRG.

== Production ==
=== Background ===
Promoter Adolfo Moreno had promoted Lucha Libre, or professional wrestling in Naucalpan, State of Mexico, Mexico prior to financing the building of Arena Naucalpan that opened in late 1976. Originally Moreno worked together with the Universal Wrestling Association (UWA) and then later Consejo Mundial de Lucha Libre (CMLL) as a local promoter. On January 1, 1996 Moreno created International Wrestling Revolution Group (IWRG) as an independent promotion. IWRG celebrates the anniversary of Arena Naucalpan each year in December with a major show, making it the second oldest, still promoted show series in the world. pre-dating WrestleMania by eight years. Only the CMLL Anniversary Show series has a longer history. The 2010 Arena Naucalpan anniversary show marked the 33rd Anniversary of Arena Naucalpab. The Anniversary show, as well as the majority of the IWRG shows in general are held in Arena Naucalpan.

=== Storylines ===
The event featured five professional wrestling matches with different wrestlers involved in pre-existing scripted feuds, plots and storylines. Wrestlers were portrayed as either heels (referred to as rudos in Mexico, those that portray the "bad guys") or faces (técnicos in Mexico, the "good guy" characters) as they followed a series of tension-building events, which culminated in a wrestling match or series of matches.

== Results ==
No.	Results	Stipulations
1	Alan Extreme and Carta Brava, Jr. defeated Centvrión and Yack	Best two-out-of-three falls tag team match
2	Eterno and Hammer defeated Dinamic Black and Eragon	Best two-out-of-three falls tag team match
3	El Ángel, El Pantera and Tony Rivera defeated Los Gringos VIP (Avisman, El Hijo del Diablo and Gringo Loco) by disqualification	Best two out of three falls six-man tag team match
4	Los Oficiales (Oficial 911, Oficial AK-47 and Oficial Fierro) defeated La Milicia (Billy Boy, Decnis and Tigre Cota)	Best two out of three falls six-man tag team match
5	La Sociedad (Chris Stone, Hernandez and Silver Cain) defeated Dr. Wagner Jr., Electroshock and Máscara Año 2000 Jr.	Best two out of three falls six-man tag team match
