= IWRG Ruleta de la Muerte (2009) =

2009 International Wrestling Revolution Group event

- Promotion: International Wrestling Revolution Group
- Date: November 5, 2009
- City: Naucalpan, State of Mexico
- Venue: Arena Naucalpan

Event chronology
← Previous; El Castillo del Terror	Next → 25 Años de El Pantera

Ruleta de la Muerte chronology
← Previous; 1998	Next → 2012

The Mexican professional wrestling promotion International Wrestling Revolution Group (IWRG; Sometimes referred to as Grupo Internacional Revolución in Mexico) produced and scripted a Ruleta de la Muerte (Spanish for "Roulette of Death") tournament on November 5, 2009. The show took place in Arena Naucalpan, in Naucalpan, State of Mexico, Mexico, IWRG's main venue and the site of the majority of all their major shows and tournaments.

The lucha libre concept of a Ruleta de la Muerte tournament sees tag teams battle it out, with the losing team in the match advancing in the tournament. The team to lose the last tag team match will then be forced to wrestle each other under Lucha de Apuestas, or "bet match" rules, in this case putting their hair on the line. The tournament started with eight team and then boiled down to Chico Che and Gringo Loco, with Gringo Loco winning the match, forcing Chico Che to be shaved bald as a result of his pinfall loss. The show featured two more matches outside of the eight Ruleta de la Muerte matches.

== Production ==
=== Background ===
Mexican lucha libre, or professional wrestling, has a long-standing tradition around the wrestling mask and its role in both lucha libre and the culture of Mexico itself. In 1940 the Lucha de Apuestas, or "Bet match", was invented where a wrestler would either bet their mask or their hair (or on rare occasions their career) on the outcome of the match. If a masked wrestler lost the match he would be forced to remove his mask, state his given name and then never be allowed to wrestle with that mask on again. If an unmasked wrestler lost a Lucha de Apuestas he or she would be forced to have all his/her hair shaved off while standing in the middle of the ring, suffering the humiliation in front of everyone in attendance. Over time the Lucha de Apuestas matches became more prestigious than championship matches in Mexico and would often headline major shows. It is unclear exactly when the Rouleta de la Muerte (Spanish for "Roulete of Death"), some times also referred to as Ruleta Rusa (Russian Roulette), tournament concept was created. The concept of the tournament is similar to another lucha libre staple the Professional wrestling tag team match types#Parejas SuicidasParejas Suicidas ("Suicide Teams") or Relevos suicida ("Suicide Relays") match. in a Parejas Suicida teams of two, often composed of rivals, have to wrestle against each other, the losing team is then forced to fight each other as "punishment" for losing the match. In a Ruleta de la Muerte the number of teams is expanded, often to four or eight teams. these teams face off and the losing team in each match moves on to the next round, until the team that loses the finals of the tag team portion are forced to face off for either their mask or their hair.

The earliest recorded Rouleta de la Muerte was held on October 11, 1975 by at the Plaza de Toros Mexico in Mexico City. In the tournament As Charro and Gallo Tapado defeated Chicano Power and Sangre Fria, forcing them to unmask, as well as winning 40.000 Pesos. The Mexican professional wrestling promotion International Wrestling Revolution Group (IWRG; Sometimes referred to as Grupo Internacional Revolución in Spanish) held their first Ruleta de la Muerte tournament in 1998 as well, part of their Arena Naucalpan 21st Anniversary Show held on December 20, 1998 and saw the masked Mega defeat Judo Suwa, forcing the Japanese wrestler to be shaved bald as a result. In 2006 they held another Ruleta de la Muerte tournament, this time as part of their 2006. For this event the tournament format was slightly modified, using two first round matches where six wrestlers fought to stay out of the final Lucha de Apuestas match. In the end, the masked Coco Verde pinned Dr. Cerebro, forcing Dr. Cerebro to have all his hair shaved off. In 2009 IWRG held the 2009 Ruleta de la Muerte show, with the eponymous tournament as the focal point. In the finale, Gringo Loco defeated Chico Che after the team had lost two matches to get in the finals.

=== Storylines ===
The event featured ten professional wrestling matches with different wrestlers involved in pre-existing scripted feuds, plots and storylines. Wrestlers were portrayed as either heels (referred to as rudos in Mexico, those that portray the "bad guys") or faces (técnicos in Mexico, the "good guy" characters) as they followed a series of tension-building events, which culminated in a wrestling match or series of matches.

== Event ==
For the Ruleta de la Muerte tournament IWRG teamed up eight teams of rudos and tecnicos, some masked and some unmasked. The teams were El Hijo del Diablo (unmasked, rudo) and Zatura (masked, tecnico), Oficial AK-47 (masked, rudo) and El Hijo de Pirata Morgan (masked, tecnico), Capitan Muerte (masked, rudo) and Miss Gaviota (unmasked tecnico). Arlequín Negro (masked, rudo) and Ultraman Jr. (masked, tecnico), Barba Roja (masked, tecnico) and Pendulo (masked, rudo), Chico Che (unmasked, tecnico) and Gringo Loco (unmasked, rudo), Eragon (masked, tecnico) and Menfis (masked, rudo) and finally Cerebro Negro (unmasked, rudo) and Exodia (masked, tecnico). The tag team portion of the match ended as Oficial AK-47 and El Hijo de Pirata Morgan defeated Chico Che and Gringo Loco to keep their masks safe. The final match saw Gringo Loco cheat to defeat Chico Che, forcing Che to have all his hair shaved off as a result.

== Results ==
No.	Results	Stipulations
1	Keshin Black defeated Mascara Magnifica	Singles match
2	Mike Segura, Star Boy and Tetsuya Bushi defeated Avisman and La Ola Maldita (Maldito Jr. and Samoth)	Best two-out-of-three falls six-man tag team match
3	El Hijo del Diablo and Zatura defeated Oficial AK-47 and El Hijo de Pirata Morgan	Ruleta de la Muerte tournament quarter final match
4	Capitan Muerte and Miss Gaviota defeated Arlequín Negro and Ultraman Jr.	Ruleta de la Muerte tournament quarter final match
5	Barba Roja and Pendulo defeated Chico Che and Gringo Loco	Ruleta de la Muerte tournament quarter final match
6	Eragon and Menfis defeated Cerebro Negro and Exodia	Ruleta de la Muerte tournament quarter final match
7	Arlequín Negro and Ultraman Jr. defeated Oficial AK-47 and El Hijo de Pirata Morgan	Ruleta de la Muerte tournament semi-final match
8	Cerebro Negro and Exodia defeated Chico Che and Gringo Loco	Ruleta de la Muerte tournament semi-final match
9	Oficial AK-47 and El Hijo de Pirata Morgan defeated Chico Che and Gringo Loco	Ruleta de la Muerte tournament final match
10	Gringo Loco defeated Chico Che	Best two-out-of-three-fall Lucha de Apuestas, hair vs. hair match.
