= Arena Naucalpan 29th Anniversary Show =

2006 International Wrestling Revolution Group event

- Promotion: International Wrestling Revolution Group
- Date: December 21, 2006
- City: Naucalpan, State of Mexico
- Venue: Arena Naucalpan

Event chronology
← Previous; El Castillo del Terror	Next → IWRG 10th Anniversary Show

Arena Naucalpan Anniversary Show chronology
← Previous; 28th Anniversary	Next → 30th Anniversary

The Arena Naucalpan 29th Anniversary Show was a major annual professional wrestling event produced and scripted by the Mexican professional wrestling promotion International Wrestling Revolution Group (IWRG), which took place on December 21, 2006, in Arena Naucalpan, Naucalpan, State of Mexico, Mexico. As the name implies the show celebrated the 29th Anniversary of the construction of Arena Naucalpan, IWRG's main venue in 1977. The show is IWRG's longest-running show, predating IWRG being founded in 1996 and is the fourth oldest, still held, annual show in professional wrestling.

The focal point of the show was a 12-man Ruleta de la Muerte ("Roulette of Death") tournament, consisting of two six-man matches where the loser would be forced to defend his hair or mask in the finals. In the end, Coco Verde defeated Dr. Cerebro, forcing Dr. Cerebro to have all his hair shaved off as a result of the Lucha de Apuestas, or "bet match" stipulations. The show featured three additional matches.

== Production ==
=== Background ===
The location at Calle Jardín 19, Naucalpan Centro, 53000 Naucalpan de Juárez, México, Mexico was originally an indoor roller rink for the locals in the late part of the 1950s known as "Cafe Algusto". By the early-1960s, the building was sold and turned into "Arena KO Al Gusto" and became a local lucha libre or professional wrestling arena, with a ring permanently set up in the center of the building. Promoter Adolfo Moreno began holding shows on a regular basis from the late 1960s, working with various Mexican promotions such as Empresa Mexicana de Lucha Libre (EMLL) to bring lucha libre to Naucalpan. By the mid-1970s the existing building was so run down that it was no longer suitable for hosting any events. Moreno bought the old build and had it demolished, building Arena Naucalpan on the same location, becoming the permanent home of Promociones Moreno. Arena Naucalpan opened its doors for the first lucha libre show on December 17, 1977. From that point on the arena hosted regular weekly shows for Promociones Moreno and also hosted EMLL and later Universal Wrestling Association (UWA) on a regular basis. In the 1990s the UWA folded and Promociones Moreno worked primarily with EMLL, now rebranded as Consejo Mundial de Lucha Libre (CMLL).

In late 1995 Adolfo Moreno decided to create his own promotion, creating a regular roster instead of relying totally on wrestlers from other promotions, creating the International Wrestling Revolution Group (IWRG; sometimes referred to as Grupo Internacional Revolución in Spanish) on January 1, 1996. From that point on Arena Naucalpan became the main venue for IWRG, hosting the majority of their weekly shows and all of their major shows as well. While IWRG was a fresh start for the Moreno promotion they kept the annual Arena Naucalpan Anniversary Show tradition alive, making it the only IWRG show series that actually preceded their foundation. The Arena Naucalpan Anniversary Show is the fourth oldest still ongoing annual show in professional wrestling, the only annual shows that older are the Consejo Mundial de Lucha Libre Anniversary Shows (started in 1934), the Arena Coliseo Anniversary Show (first held in 1943), and the Aniversario de Arena México (first held in 1957).=

In Lucha libre, the Mexican version of professional wrestling the Ruleta de la Muerte ("Roulette of Death") is a type of Professional wrestling tournament where the loser or losers of a match would advance in the tournament instead of the winners. The finals of a Ruleta de la Muerte tournament featured the losing team wrestle each other under Lucha de Apuestas, or "bet match" rules, where the loser would be forced to either unmask or have all their hair shaved off as a result. Various Mexican promotions have held Ruleta de la Muerte tournaments, some like International Wrestling Revolution Group (IWRG; Sometimes referred to as Grupo Internacional Revolución in Mexico) has held these tournaments on a regular basis. The first documented Ruleta de la Muerte tournament was held in 1998 with Mega defeating Judo Suwa, forcing Suwa to be shaved bald as a result. In subsequent years IWRG has held multiple Ruleta de la Muerte tournaments, at times using it as the name of the event for instance the 2009 Ruleta de la Muerte show.

=== Storylines ===
The event featured six professional wrestling matches with different wrestlers involved in pre-existing scripted feuds, plots and storylines. Wrestlers were portrayed as either heels (referred to as rudos in Mexico, those that portray the "bad guys") or faces (técnicos in Mexico, the "good guy" characters) as they followed a series of tension-building events, which culminated in a wrestling match or series of matches.

== Event ==
The Ruleta de la Muerte match format started with two matches with six wrestlers in each, with the loser of each match moving on to the finals where they would be forced to defend their mask or hair against the loser of the other six-man match. In the first match Coco Verde, part of Los Payasos (a trio of wrestlers dressed like clowns), lost to Black Warrior, Cerebro Negro, El Felino, Mr. Niebla and El Sagrado. In the second Ruleta de la Muerte match unmasked IWRG regular Dr. Cerebro lost to Coco Rojo (Coco Verde's tag team partner), Negro Casas, Olímpico, El Veneno and Xibalba. The final match saw Dr. Cerebro lose to Coco Verde after both Coco Rojo and Coco Blanco helped their tag team partner cheat to win.

== Results ==
No.	Results	Stipulations
1	Avisman defeated Golem	Best two-out-of-three-falls match
2	Camora and Comando Mega defeated Kid Tiger and Puma King	Best two-out-of-three-falls tag team match
3	Coco Blanco, Villano III and Villano IV defeated Alex Koslov, Negro Navarro and Pierroth Jr.	Best two-out-of-three falls six-man tag team match
4	Black Warrior, Cerebro Negro, El Felino, Mr. Niebla and El Sagrado defeated Coco Verde	Ruleta de la Muerte, semi-final match
5	Coco Rojo, Negro Casas, Olímpico, El Veneno and Xibalba defeated Dr. Cerebro	Ruleta de la Muerte, semi-final match
6	Coco Verde defeated Dr. Cerebro	Ruleta de la Muerte finale, Lucha de Apuestas mask vs. hair match
