= Arena Naucalpan =

Arena in Mexico

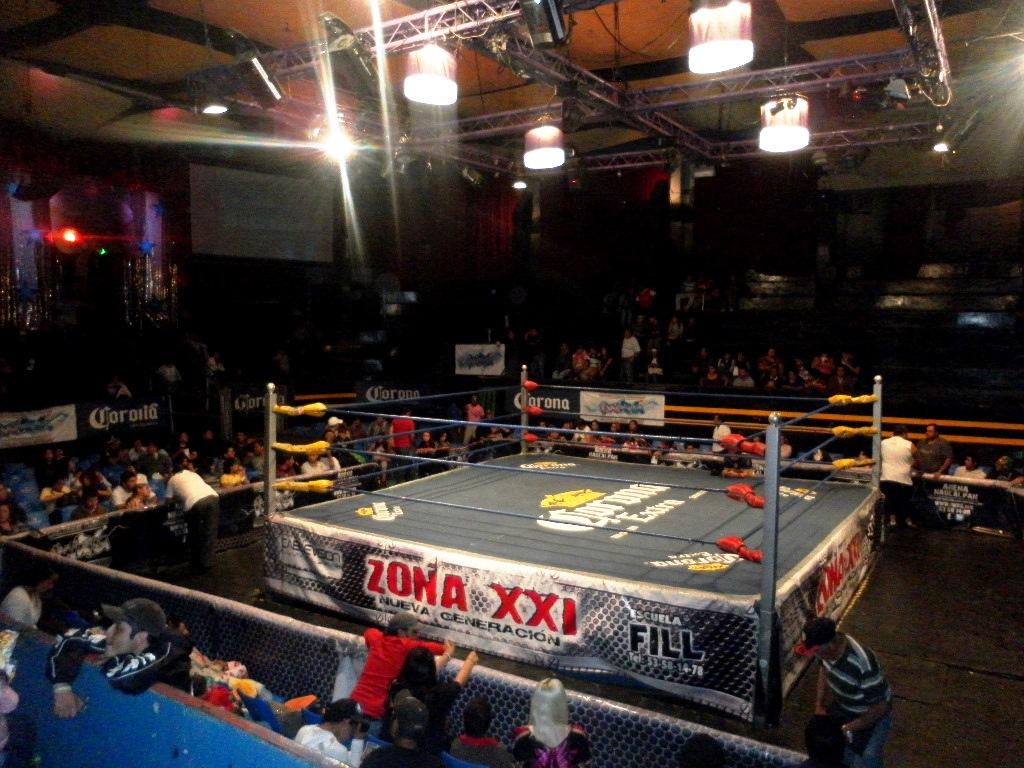
- Interactive map of Arena Naucalpan
- Former names: Arena KO Al Gusto
- Location: Calle Jardín 19, Centro, Naucalpan de Juárez, 53000.
- Coordinates: 19°28′24.6″N 99°13′53.8″W
- Owner: Adolfo Moreno (1977-2007); César and Marco Moreno (2007-present)
- Capacity: 2,400 (Professional wrestling)

Construction
- Opened: December 21, 1977

Tenants
- Promociones Moreno (1960s–1995); International Wrestling Revolution Group (1996–present)

Arena Naucalpan is an indoor sports arena located in Naucalpan de Juárez, Mexico located on Calle Jardín 19, Naucalpan Centro. The arena is primarily used for professional wrestling, or lucha libre, mainly shows promoted by International Wrestling Revolution Group (IWRG) but has also hosted a number of other promotions since its creation in 1977. Arena Naucalpan has a capacity of 2,400 spectators and is generally configured for professional wrestling with a ring permanently in the center of the arena.

in 1977 the arena replaced Arena KO Al Gusto that was in the same location, when professional wrestling promoter Adolfo Moreno bought the location and had the old roller rink building turned into Arena Naucalpan. From 1977 through 1995 the arena was the center of Promociones Moreno and from 1996 on the home of International Wrestling Revolution Group, the promotion founded by Moreno. When Adolfo Moreno died in 2007 Moreno's sons César and Marco Moreno took ownership of the arena as well as control of IWRG.

The arena hosts the majority of IWRG's shows and all of the promotion's major shows such as the IWRG Anniversary Shows as well as the Arena Naucalpan Anniversary Shows, held each December around December 21.

== History ==
The location at Calle Jardín 19, Naucalpan Centro, 53000 Naucalpan de Juárez, México, Mexico was originally an indoor roller rink for the locals in the late part of the 1950s known as Cafe Algusto. By the early-1960s the building was sold and turned into "Arena KO Al Gusto" and became a local lucha libre or professional wrestling arena, with a ring permanently set up in the center of the building. Promoter Adolfo Moreno began holding shows on a regular basis from the late 1960s, working with various Mexican promotions such as Empresa Mexicana de Lucha Libre (EMLL) to bring lucha libre to Naucalpan. The earliest match reports from Arena KO Al Gusto are dated December 12, 1962 with a main event battle royal that featured wrestler-turned-promoter Adolfo Moreno as one of the participants. By the mid-1970s the existing building was so run down that it was no longer suitable for hosting any events. Moreno bought the old build and had it demolished, building Arena Naucalpan on the same location, becoming the permanent home of Promociones Moreno.

Arena Naucalpan opened its doors for the first lucha libre show on December 17, 1977. From that point on the arena hosted regular weekly shows for Promociones Moreno and also hosted EMLL and later Universal Wrestling Association (UWA) on a regular basis. In the 1990s the UWA folded and Promociones Moreno worked primarily with EMLL, now rebranded as Consejo Mundial de Lucha Libre (CMLL). From the mid-1990s Moreno would promote several Naucalpan championships, including the Naucalpan Tag Team Championship, Naucalpan Middleweight Championship and the Naucalpan Welterweight Championship, all sanctioned by the local boxing and wrestling commission.

In late 1995 Adolfo Moreno decided to create his own promotion, creating a regular roster instead of relying totally on wrestlers from other promotions, creating the International Wrestling Revolution Group (IWRG; sometimes referred to as Grupo Internacional Revolución in Spanish) on January 1, 1996. From that point on Arena Naucalpan became the main venue for IWRG, hosting the majority of their weekly shows and all of their major shows as well. With the creation of the IWRG Moreno abandoned the Naucalpan championships, instead introducing a series of IWRG branded championships, starting with the IWRG Intercontinental Middleweight Championship created on July 27, 1997, followed by the IWRG Intercontinental Heavyweight Championship two months later. IWRG also kept promoting the Distrito Federal Trios Championship, the only championship predating the foundation of the IWRG.

In 2007 Adolfo Moreno died, leaving his sons César and Marco Moreno to take ownership of both International Wrestling Revolution Group as well as Arena Naucalpan.

== Present operations ==
Arena Naucalpan is permanently set up for lucha libre events, usually hosting IWRG shows on Wednesday and Sunday nights and on occasion hosting shows for other promotions including regular stops by IWRG-partner promotion Lucha Libre AAA World Wide (AAA) as well as shows for various Mexican independent circuit promotion. In its current configuration the arena has a maximum capacity of 2,400 spectators.

Each year IWRG celebrates the anniversary of Arena Naucalpan's opening with their Fiesta Aniversario, the only recurring show series that actually predates the foundation of the IWRG. The anniversary is held on the Sunday or Wednesday in December closest to the 17th. Throughout the year Arena Naucalpan hosts all of IWRG's major event, starting with the IWRG Anniversary Shows, normally celebrated on the first IWRG show of the year, commemorating the January 1, 1996 date IWRG was founded. Other regular shows held throughout the year includes the annual IWRG El Protector tournament, La Guerra de Familias ("War of the Families"), Rebelión de los Juniors ("The Junior Rebellion"), Guerra del Golfo ("Gulf War"), Rey del Ring ("King of the Ring"), Legado Final ("Final Legacy"), Festival de las Máscaras ("Festival of the mask), La Gran Cruzada ("The Great Crusade"), Caravana de Campeones ("Caravan of Champions"), Prison Fatal ("Deadly Prison"), and El Castillo del Terror ("The Tower of Terror").

== Arena Naucalpan Anniversary Shows ==
Event	Date	Main Event	Ref(s)
1st Anniversary Show	December 1978	Unknown	
2nd Anniversary Show	December 19, 1979	Black Man, El Santo, and Mil Máscaras vs. Dr. Wagner, Negro Navarro, and Villano III	
3rd Anniversary Show	December 1980	Unknown	
4th Anniversary Show	December 1981	Unknown	
5th Anniversary Show	December 22, 1982	Los Misioneros de la Muerte (El Signo, El Texano and Negro Navarro) vs. Los Villanos (Villano I, Villano II and Villano III in a best two-out-of-three-falls six-man tag team match	
6th Anniversary Show	December 21, 1983	Trio Fantastico (Black Man, Kato Kung Lee, and Kung Fu) vs. Los Misioneros de la Muerte (El Signo, Negro Navarro, and El Texano)	
7th Anniversary Show	December 1984	Unknown	
8th Anniversary Show	December 1985	Unknown	
9th Anniversary Show	December 1986	Unknown	
10th Anniversary Show	December 1987	Unknown	
11th Anniversary Show	December 1988	Unknown	
12th Anniversary Show	December 1989	Unknown	
13th Anniversary Show	December 1990	Unknown	
14th Anniversary Show	December 1991	Unknown	
15th Anniversary Show	December 16, 1992	Bestia Salvaje vs. El Dandy for the CMLL World Middleweight Championship	
16th Anniversary Show	December 1993	Unknown	
17th Anniversary Show	December 1994	Unknown	
18th Anniversary Show	December 17, 1995	Kraneo vs. Sable in a Lucha de Apuestas match	
19th Anniversary Show	December 1996	Unknown	
20th Anniversary Show	December 1997	Unknown	
21st Anniversary Show	December 20, 1998	Eight-man Ruleta de la Muerte tournament	
22nd Anniversary Show	December 19, 1999	El Hijo del Santo vs. Scorpio Jr. for the El Copa del Mileno trophy	
23rd Anniversary Show	December 17, 2000	Último Vampiro vs. Oficial in a Lucha de Apuestas match	
24th Anniversary Show	December 20, 2001	Último Vampiro vs. El Enterrador in a Luchas de Apuestas match	
25th Anniversary Show	December 19, 2002	El Hijo del Santo vs. Scorpio Jr. in a Lucha de Apuestas match	
26th Anniversary Show	December 21, 2003	Avisman vs. Cerebro Negro in a Lucha de Apuestas match	
27th Anniversary Show	December 19, 2004	Dr. Cerebro vs. Masada in a Lucha de Apuestas match.	
28th Anniversary Show	December 22, 2005	El Felino vs. Mephisto vs. Pierroth vs. Stuka Jr. vs. Ultra Mega vs. Matrix vs. Nitro vs. El Pantera vs.El Sagrado vs. Némesis in a Torneo de Mascaras steel cage match	
29th Anniversary Show	December 21, 2006	Black Warrior vs. Cerebro Negro vs. Coco Verde vs Coco Rojo vs. Dr. Cerebro vs. El Felino vs. Mr. Niebla vs. El Sagrado vs. Negro Casas vs. Olímpico vs. El Veneno vs. Xibalba in a Ruleta de la Muerte tournament	
30th Anniversary Show	December 20, 2007	Bogeman, El Hijo del Santo and El Pantera vs. Cerebro Negro, El Hijo del Cien Caras and Villano III	
31st Anniversary Show	December 19, 2008	El Hijo del Cien Caras and Máscara Año 2000 Jr. (c) vs. Los Guapos (Scorpio Jr. and Zumbido) for the IWRG Intercontinental Tag Team Championship	
32nd Anniversary Show	December 17, 2009	Capitán Muerte vs. Exodia vs. Fantasma de la Ópera vs. El Hijo del Pirata Morgan vs. Péndulo vs. Tóxico vs Trauma I vs Ultramán Jr. vs. Xibalba vs. Zatura in a Lucha de Apuestas steel cage match	
33rd Anniversary Show	December 16, 2010	La Sociedad (Chris Stone, Hernandez and Silver Cain) vs. Dr. Wagner Jr., Electroshock and Máscara Año 2000 Jr.	
34th Anniversary Show	December 22, 2011	Oficial 911 and Trauma II vs. Oficial AK-47 and Trauma I in a Relevos Suicidas match	
35th Anniversary Show	December 20, 2012	Dr. Wagner, Jr. and El Hijo de Dr. Wagner, Jr. vs. El Canek and El Canek, Jr. vs. La Familia de Tijuana (Damian 666 and X-Fly) vs. Los Hermanos Dinamita, Jr. (Hijo de Máscara Año 2000 and Máscara Año 2000, Jr.) vs. Los Piratas (Hijo de Pirata Morgan and Pirata Morgan) in a five team steel cage match	
36th Anniversary Show	December 19, 2013	Oficial Fierro and Trauma II vs Golden Magic and El Hijo del Pirata Morgan vs. Oficial 911 and X-Fly	
37th Anniversary Show	December 21, 2014	Oficial AK-47 vs. Canis Lupus vs. Hijo del Máscara Año 2000 vs. El Hijo del Pirata Morgan vs Máscara Año 2000 vs. Máscara Sagrada vs. Pirata Morgan vs. Rayo de Jalisco Jr. vs. Súper Nova vs. X-Fly in a Prison Fatal steel cage match	
38th Anniversary Show	December 20, 2015	Los Insoportables (Eterno and Apolo Estrada Jr.) vs. Los Terribles Cerebros (Black Terry and Dr. Cerebro) in a Luchas de Apuestas. hair vs. hair. match	
39th Anniversary Show	December 21, 2016	Golden Magic and Pirata Morgan Jr. vs. The Killer Jr. and Pantera I vs. Imposible and Relampago in a Relevos Suicida match	
40th Anniversary Show	December 17, 2017	Oficial Spector vs. Black Dragón in a Lucha de Apuestas, mask vs. mask match	
41st Anniversary Show	December 21, 2018	LA Park and El Hijo de LA Park vs. Rey Wagner and El Hijo del Dr. Wagner Jr.	
42nd Anniversary Show	December 22, 2019	Ketzal and Oficial 911 vs. Gato Negro and Warrior Jr. vs. Neza Kid Jr. and Freelance vs. Torito Negro and Toro Negro vs. Puma de Oro and Black Terry vs. Guerrero Olímpico and Dragón Fly, in a Maestro/Estudiante Ruleta de la Muerte tournament	
