= Arena Naucalpan 21st Anniversary Show =

1998 International Wrestling Revolution Group event

- Promotion: International Wrestling Revolution Group
- Date: December 20, 1998
- City: Naucalpan, State of Mexico
- Venue: Arena Naucalpan

Event chronology
← Previous; IWRG 2nd Anniversary Show	Next → IWRG 3rd Anniversary Show

Arena Naucalpan Anniversary Show chronology
← Previous; 20th Anniversary	Next → 22nd Anniversary

The Arena Naucalpan 21st Anniversary Show was a major annual professional wrestling event produced and scripted by the Mexican professional wrestling promotion International Wrestling Revolution Group (IWRG), which took place on December 20, 1998 in Arena Naucalpan, Naucalpan, State of Mexico, Mexico. As the name implies the show celebrated the 21st Anniversary of the construction of Arena Naucalpan, IWRG's main venue in 1977. The show is IWRG's longest-running show, predating IWRG being founded in 1996 and is the fourth oldest, still held annual show in professional wrestling.

The focal point of the 21st Anniversary show was a 16-man Ruleta de la Muerte (Spanish for "Roulette of death") tournament where the losing teams would advance in the tournament. In the end tag team partners Mega and Judo Suwa were forced to wrestle each other after having lost all three tournament matches. Mega won the Lucha de Apuestas ("Bet match") and as a result Judo Suwa was forced to have all his hair shaved off.

== Production ==
=== Background ===
The location at Calle Jardín 19, Naucalpan Centro, 53000 Naucalpan de Juárez, México, Mexico was originally an indoor roller rink for the locals in the late part of the 1950s known as "Cafe Algusto". By the early-1960s, the building was sold and turned into "Arena KO Al Gusto" and became a local lucha libre or professional wrestling arena, with a ring permanently set up in the center of the building. Promoter Adolfo Moreno began holding shows on a regular basis from the late 1960s, working with various Mexican promotions such as Empresa Mexicana de Lucha Libre (EMLL) to bring lucha libre to Naucalpan. By the mid-1970s the existing building was so run down that it was no longer suitable for hosting any events. Moreno bought the old build and had it demolished, building Arena Naucalpan on the same location, becoming the permanent home of Promociones Moreno. Arena Naucalpan opened its doors for the first lucha libre show on December 17, 1977. From that point on the arena hosted regular weekly shows for Promociones Moreno and also hosted EMLL and later Universal Wrestling Association (UWA) on a regular basis. In the 1990s the UWA folded and Promociones Moreno worked primarily with EMLL, now rebranded as Consejo Mundial de Lucha Libre (CMLL).

In late 1995 Adolfo Moreno decided to create his own promotion, creating a regular roster instead of relying totally on wrestlers from other promotions, creating the International Wrestling Revolution Group (IWRG; sometimes referred to as Grupo Internacional Revolución in Spanish) on January 1, 1996. From that point on Arena Naucalpan became the main venue for IWRG, hosting the majority of their weekly shows and all of their major shows as well. While IWRG was a fresh start for the Moreno promotion they kept the annual Arena Naucalpan Anniversary Show tradition alive, making it the only IWRG show series that actually preceded their foundation. The Arena Naucalpan Anniversary Show is the fourth oldest still ongoing annual show in professional wrestling, the only annual shows that older are the Consejo Mundial de Lucha Libre Anniversary Shows (started in 1934), the Arena Coliseo Anniversary Show (first held in 1943), and the Aniversario de Arena México (first held in 1957).=

In Lucha libre, the Mexican version of professional wrestling the Ruleta de la Muerte ("Roulette of Death") is a type of Professional wrestling tournament where the loser or losers of a match would advance in the tournament instead of the winners. The finals of a Ruleta de la Muerte tournament featured the losing team wrestle each other under Lucha de Apuestas, or "bet match" rules, where the loser would be forced to either unmask or have all their hair shaved off as a result. Various Mexican promotions have held Ruleta de la Muerte tournaments, some like IWRG has held these tournaments on a regular basis over the years. The first documented instance of IWRG hosting a Ruleta de la Muerte tournament was for their Arena Naucalpan 21st Anniversary Show, but would later hold shows specifically promoted as the Ruleta de la Muerte.

=== Storylines ===
The event featured nine professional wrestling matches with different wrestlers involved in pre-existing scripted feuds, plots and storylines. Wrestlers were portrayed as either heels (referred to as rudos in Mexico, those that portray the "bad guys") or faces (técnicos in Mexico, the "good guy" characters) as they followed a series of tension-building events, which culminated in a wrestling match or series of matches.

== Event ==
The opening match of the Arena Naucalpan 21st Anniversary show was the only match that was not part of the Ruleta de la Muerte tournament, a regular Best two-out-of-three falls six-man tag team match. The match was won by the tecnico team of Fantasy, Zonik and the Japanese Genki Horiguchi as they defeated Rey Pantera and Japanese wrestlers Kenichiro Arai and Susumu Mochizuki two falls to one.

In the first round of the Ruleta de la Muerte Guardia and Kato Kung Lee Jr. defeated Kato Kung Lee, the father of Kato Kung Lee Jr, and Mr. Niebla to escape the tournament with their mask and hair. In the second match Los Oficiales ("The Officials"; Maniacop and Vigilante) used their experience as a tag team to defeat the masked Mega and Judo Suwa. Masked wrestler Dr. Cerebro and the unmasked wrestler El Salsero defeated America and Shiima Nobunaga, while Bombero Infernal and Kro 2000 lost the last match of the first round. In the second round of the tournament lucha libre legend Kato Kung Lee and Mr. Niebla defeated Mega and Suwa, sending Mega and Suwa to the final tag team match of the tournament. Bombero Infernal and Kro 2000 ensured that America and Nobunaga became Mega and Suwa's opponents. After a quick fall Mega and Suwa lost, which meant Mega would risk his mask and Suwa would risk his hair as the two faced off moments after the loss. In the end Mega pinned the rookie Suwa, forcing the Japanese wrestler to have all his hair shaved off as a result.

== Aftermath ==
Judo Suwa, Horiguchi, Nobunaga, Arai and Mochizuki all returned to Japan in early 1999, returning to their native Toryumon and would return to Mexico on occasion in subsequent years to work select IWRG shows. The IWRG/Toryumon arrangement lasted until 2001.

== Results ==
No.	Results	Stipulations
1	Fantasy, Genki Horiguchi and Zonik defeated Kenichiro Arai, Rey Pantera and Susumu Mochizuki	Best two-out-of-three falls six-man tag team match
2	Guardia and Kato Kung Lee Jr. defeated Kato Kung Lee and Mr. Niebla (Note: Not the same Mr. Niebla who has worked primarily for Consejo Mundial de Lucha Libre. This Mr. Niebla would later be known as Mr. Mexico.)	Ruleta de la Muerte first round match
3	Los Oficiales (Maniacop and Vigilante) defeated Judo Suwa and Mega	Ruleta de la Muerte first round match
4	Dr. Cerebro and El Salsero defeated America and Shiima Nobunaga	Ruleta de la Muerte first round match
5	Magico and Máscara Sagrada defeated Bombero Infernal and Kro 2000	Ruleta de la Muerte first round match
6	Kato Kung Lee and Mr. Niebla defeated Judo Suwa and Mega	Ruleta de la Muerte quarter-final match
7	Bombero Infernal and Kro 2000 defeated America and Shiima Nobunaga	Ruleta de la Muerte quarter-final match
8	America and Shiima Nobunaga defeated Judo Suwa and Mega	Ruleta de la Muerte semi-final match
9	Mega defeated Judo Suwa	Ruleta de la Muerte final, Lucha de Apuestas, mask vs. hair match
