= IWRG Legado Final =

International Wrestling Revolution Group event series

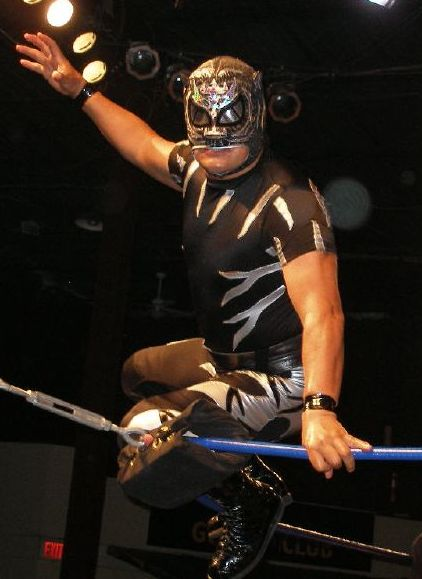
Pantera, who teamed up with his son El Hijo del Pantera for all three Legado Final shows

The Legado Final (Spanish for "Final Legacy") is a series of major wrestling shows produced and scripted by the Mexican lucha libre professional wrestling promotion International Wrestling Revolution Group (IWRG; sometimes referred to as Grupo Internacional Revolución in Mexico). The first Legado Final show was held on June 2, 2011 at IWRG's main venue Arena Naucalpan, with a second held in 2012 and a third show held in 2015. The event celebrates, or pays tribute to, the fact that lucha libre is a family tradition with a main event tournament where fathers and sons team up for a tag team elimination match.

Previous winners include El Brazo and El Hijo del Brazo in 2011, Pirata Morgan and El Hijo de Pirata Morgan in 2012 and finally El Hijo del Diablo and Dragón Celestial in 2015. After the 2015 match Dragón Celestial took the name "El Diablo Jr. I" and began teaming with his father on a regular basis.

== Event history ==
professional wrestling has been a generational tradition in Lucha libre since its inception early in the 20th century, with a great deal of second or third-generation wrestlers following in the footsteps of their fathers or mothers. Several lucha libre promotions honor those traditions, often with annual tournaments such as Consejo Mundial de Lucha Libre's La Copa Junior. In addition to actual second or third-generation wrestlers lucha libre also has a number of wrestlers who are presented as second or third-generation wrestlers by the promoters without actually being a second or third-generation wrestler. These are normally masked wrestlers promoted as "Juniors", on a few occasions billed as "El Hijo de" (Literally "The Son of") These wrestlers normally pay a royalty or fee for the use of the name, using the name of an established star to get attention from fans and promoters. Examples of such instances of fictional family relationships include Arturo Beristain, also known as El Hijo del Gladiador ("The Son of El Gladiador) who was not related to the original El Gladiador, or El Hijo de Cien Caras who paid Cien Caras for the rights to use the name.

Over the years the Mexican International Wrestling Revolution Group (IWRG) has held various tournaments and shows to celebrate the role of family in lucha libre and even created a championship, the IWRG Junior de Juniors Championship, specifically for second or third-generation wrestlers. IWRG also holds an annual Rebelión de los Juniors ("The Junior Rebellion") show each year to tie in with the Junior de Juniors Championship. IWRG's Guerra de Familias ("War of the Families") was first held in 2012 and has been held on several occasions since then including the 2012 Guerra de Familias show and the 2015 Guerra de Familias show.

In 2011 IWRG held the first Legado Final show with the eponymous Legado Final tournament as the main event. In the Legado Final tournament tag teams made up of fathers and sons. The tournament would start out with the fathers in the ring or on the apron while the sons remained on the floor. When a father is eliminated the son is allowed to enter the match, working through all eliminations until one wrestler or one team remains to win the tournament. Wrestlers could be eliminated from the match by pinfall, submission, disqualification or count out. While the tournament is designed specifically for father/son teams IWRG has been forced to make exceptions to that rule for some of the teams in the event. In 2011 El Solar was scheduled to team up with his son El Hijo del Solar, but for unexplained reasons Solar had to team up with Fresero Jr. instead. In 2012 Danny Casas, himself a third-generation wrestler, replaced Ultraman Jr. as he teamed up with Ultraman and the storyline cousins Hijo de Máscara Año 2000 and Cien Caras Jr. competed in the tournament when Máscara Año 2000 was not able to make it to the show. the team of Hijo de Máscara Año 2000 and Cien Caras Jr. also competed as a team for the 2015 Legado Final as Máscara Año 2000 was advertised for the show but did not appear.

The first Legado Final tournament was won by the team of El Brazo and El Hijo del Brazo as they outlasted the teams of Los Piratas (Pirata Morgan and El Hijo de Pirata Morgan), Los Panteras (Pantera and El Hijo del Pantera), La Dinastia de la Muerte (Negro Navarro and Trauma I), Máscara Año 2000 and Máscara Año 2000, Jr. and El Solar and Fresero, Jr. The second Legado Final was won by Los Piratas (Pirata Morgan and El Hijo de Pirata Morgan) as they defeated Danny Casas and Ultraman, Los Panteras (El Hijo del Pantera and El Pantera), La Familia de Tijuana (Bestia 666 and Damián 666), Los Hermanos Dinamita Jr. (Cien Caras, Jr. and Hijo de Máscara Año 2000) and Máscara Sagrada and Máscara Sagrada, Jr. The 2015 Legado Final tournament was won by the father/son team of El Hijo del Diablo and Dragón Celestial by defeating El Hijo del Solar and El Solar, Los Panteras (El Hijo del Pantera and El Pantera), Las Piratas (Pirata Morgan Jr. and Pirata Morgan), Universo 2000 Jr. and Universo 2000, Hijo de Máscara Año 2000 and Cien Caras Jr. After the match the winning team announced that from that point on Dragón Celestial would be known as "El Diablo Jr." changing his ring character to acknowledge his heritage.

As of the 2015 Legado Final show 60 wrestlers have competed on at least one of the shows, working one of the 12 matches held as part of the event series. All wrestlers have been male and competed in the regular division, no female wrestlers and no Mini-Estrellas. Only three wrestlers, El Pantera, his son El Hijo del Pantera and Pirata Morgan have competed in all three Legado Final events held so far and have all participated in the actual Legado Final match itself. Pirata Morgan teamed up with his son El Hijo de Pirata Morgan on two occasions, and with Pirata Morgan Jr. for the third event. So far only one championship has been defended, the WWS World Welterweight Championship as Multifacético defeated Dr. Cerebro at the 2011 Legado Final show to win the championship.

== Legado Final tournament winners ==
Year	Winner	Ref(s)
2011	Los Brazos (El Hijo del Brazo and El Brazo)	
2012	Los Piratas (Hijo de Pirata Morgan and Pirata Morgan)	
2015	Dragón Celestial and El Hijo del Diablo	
2017	Los Villanos (Villano IV and Villano V Jr.)	

== Dates, venues, and main events ==
Event	Date	City	Venue	Main event	Ref(s)
2011	June 2, 2011	Naucalpan, Mexico State	Arena Naucalpan	El Brazo/El Hijo del Brazo vs. Pirata Morgan/El Hijo de Pirata Morgan vs. Pantera/El Hijo del Pantera vs. Negro Navarro/Trauma I vs. Máscara Año 2000/Máscara Año 2000 Jr. vs. El Solar/Fresero Jr. – 2011 Torneo El Gran Legado 12-man Torneo cibernetico elimination Match	
2012	June 24, 2012	Naucalpan, Mexico State	Arena Naucalpan	Hijo de Pirata Morgan/Pirata Morgan vs. Danny Casas/Ultraman vs. El Hijo del Pantera/El Pantera vs. Bestia 666/Damian 666 vs. Cien Caras Jr./Hijo de Máscara Año 2000 vs. Máscara Sagrada/Máscara Sagrada Jr. 2012 Torneo El Gran Legado 12-man Torneo cibernetico elimination Match	
2015	January 1, 2015	Naucalpan, Mexico State	Arena Naucalpan	Dragón Celestial/El Hijo del Diablo vs. El Hijo del Solar/El Solar vs. El Hijo del Pantera/Pantera vs. Pirata Morgan Jr./Pirata Morgan vs. Universo 2000 Jr./Universo 2000 vs. Hijo de Máscara Año 2000/Cien Caras Jr. – 2015 Torneo El Gran Legado 12-man Torneo cibernetico elimination Match	
2017	July 30, 2017	Naucalpan, Mexico State	Arena Naucalpan	Villano V Jr. and Villano IV vs. Bombero Infernal Jr. and Bombero Infernal vs Diablo Jr. and El Hijo del Diablo vs. Golden Magic and Mr. Magic vs. El Hijo de Pirata Morgan and Pirata Morgan vs. El Hijo del Pantera and Pantera vs. Trauma I and Negro Navarro vs. Warrior Jr. and Black Warrior	
