= Legado Final (2015) =

2015 International Wrestling Revolution Group event

- Official poster for the event picturing fathers El Solar, Pantera and Pirata Morgan (left) and sons Universo 2000 Jr., Dragón Celestial and Hijo de Máscara Año 2000 (right)
- Promotion: International Wrestling Revolution Group
- Date: August 2, 2015
- City: Naucalpan, State of Mexico
- Venue: Arena Naucalpan

Event chronology
← Previous; Guerra de Familias	Next → Triangular de la Muerte

IWRG Legado Final chronology
← Previous; 2012	Next → —

El Legado Final (2015) (Spanish for "The Final Legacy") was a major annual professional wrestling event produced by Mexican professional wrestling promotion International Wrestling Revolution Group (IWRG), which took place on August 2, 2014 in Arena Naucalpan, Naucalpan, State of Mexico, Mexico. The main event of the show was the Torneo de Legado Final ("The Final Legacy Tournament"), a 12-man Torneo cibernetico. The match will have six teams compete where all teams were made up of fathers and sons teaming together. While there are examples of some wrestlers paying to be a "junior" of an established wrestler it is believed that all wrestlers billed as sons actually were sons, but with five of the six being masked it has not been definitely verified. For the show Cien Caras Jr. was brought in to replace his uncle Máscara Año 2000 who was advertised for the show but could not make it.

== Production ==
=== Background ===
professional wrestling has been a generational tradition in Lucha libre since its inception early in the 20th century, with a great deal of second or third-generation wrestlers following in the footsteps of their fathers or mothers. Several lucha libre promotions honor those traditions, often with annual tournaments such as Consejo Mundial de Lucha Libre's La Copa Junior. The Naucalpan, State of Mexico based International Wrestling Revolution Group (IWRG) has held a Legado Final (Spanish for "Final Legacy") on an annual basis since 2011, with the 2015 show marking the fifth time they used the name. The Legado Final show, as well as the majority of the IWRG shows in general will be held in "Arena Naucalpan", owned by the promoters of IWRG. In addition to legitimate second-generation wrestlers there are a number of wrestlers who are presented as second or third-generation wrestlers, normally masked wrestlers promoted as "Juniors". These wrestlers normally pay a royalty or fee for the use of the name, using the name of an established star to get attention from fans and promoters. Examples of such instances of fictional family relationships include Arturo Beristain, also known as El Hijo del Gladiador ("The Son of El Gladiador") who was not related to the original El Gladiador, or El Hijo de Cien Caras who paid Cien Caras for the rights to use the name.

=== Storylines ===
The event will feature four professional wrestling matches with different wrestlers involved in pre-existing scripted feuds, plots and storylines. Wrestlers were portrayed as either heels (referred to as rudos in Mexico, those that portray the "bad guys") or faces (técnicos in Mexico, the "good guy" characters) as they followed a series of tension-building events, which culminated in a wrestling match or series of matches.

On July 28, 2015 IWRG announced that they would be holding that year's Legado Final show on Sunday August 2, 2015 in Area Naucalpan. The six announced father and son teams were; El Hijo del Solar and El Solar, El Hijo del Pantera and El Pantera, Pirata Morgan Jr. and Pirata Morgan, Universo 2000 Jr. and Universo 2000, Dragón Celestial and El Hijo del Diablo, Hijo de Máscara Año 2000 and Máscara Año 2000. The Legado Final match rules dictated that the father of each team would compete in a match where there were two wrestlers in the ring and the remaining four were on the outside to be tagged in during the match. When someone was eliminated, by pinfall, submission, disqualification or count out the son would enter the match. The last person remaining in the match after all 11 wrestlers were eliminated would be declared the victor along with his teammate.

At the prior week's IWRG show Golden Magic, Super Nova and Emperador Azteca teamed up to take on Los Gringos VIP (Apolo Estrada Jr., Avisman and El Hijo del Diablo) on the undercard of the show. After Golden Magic's team lost the match Golden Magic and Super Nova argued and almost came the blows after the loss.

== Event ==
In the opening match Alas de Acero, who was advertised for the match, was replaced by Adrenalina without an explanation from IWRG on why the replacement had to be made. In the second match of the night Vortize had to replace Mr. Leo on the tecnico side while Acero replaced Electro Boy on the rudo side. After pinning Imposible Metaleón challenged him to defend the IWRG Intercontinental Lightweight Championship at a future date. During the third match of the night Golden Magic ended up accidentally hitting his partner Super Nova during the match due to the rudo team of Canis Lupus, Negro Navarro and Príncipe Orión tricking Golden Magic. As a result of the accident the two started fighting, allowing the opponents to win the match. After the match Golden Magic challenged Super Nova to defend the IWRG Junior de Juniors Championship.

IWRG had originally announced that Máscara Año 2000 would team up with his son Hijo de Máscara Año 2000, but due to circumstances outside of IWRG's control they had to replace Máscara Año 2000 with Cien Caras Jr. on the night of the show. The match ended up with El Hijo del Pantera and Dragón Celestial as the last two wrestlers in the ring. During the match Dragón Celestial's father, the rudo El Hijo del Diablo pulled the referee's leg during a pinfall, breaking it up. The action drew Pantera into the ring, pointing out the infraction. At this point Dragón Celestial, who had been a tecnico his entire career up until this point, landed a low blow on El Hijo del Pantera and then pinned him. After the match Dragón Celestial announced that he would be known as "Diablo Jr. I" from that point on, adopting his father's ring name. They team also challenged Pantera and Hijo del Pantera to defend the IWRG Intercontinental Tag Team Championship against them.

== Aftermath ==
IWRG booked the teams of Hijo del Diablo and El Diablo Jr, I against Pantera and Hijo del Pantera for the following week's IWRG show on August 8, but not for the IWRG Intercontinental Tag Team Championship. They also paired up Golden Magic and Super Nova in a match against each other, but again not a championship match.

== Results ==
No.	Results	Stipulations
1	Aeroman, Adrenalina and Dragon Fly defeated Araña de Plata, Hip Hop Man and Royer Boy	Best two-out-of-three falls six-man tag team match
2	Metaleón, Miss Gaviota and Vortize defeated Atomic Star, Alas de Acero and Imposible	Best two-out-of-three falls six-man tag team match
3	Canis Lupus, Negro Navarro and Príncipe Orión defeated Golden Magic, Súper Nova and Veneno	Best two-out-of-three falls six-man tag team match
4	Dragón Celestial and El Hijo del Diablo won the El Legado Final tournament Also in the match: El Hijo del Solar and El Solar, El Hijo del Pantera and El Pantera, Pirata Morgan Jr. and Pirata Morgan, Universo 2000 Jr. and Universo 2000, Hijo de Máscara Año 2000 and Cien Caras Jr.	2015 Torneo El Gran Legado 12-man Torneo cibernetico elimination Match
