= Los Capos Junior =

Professional wrestling group

Stable
- Members: Cien Caras Jr. Hijo de Máscara Año 2000; Máscara Año 2000 Jr.
- Name(s): Los Capos Junior; Los Junior Capos; Los Junior Dinamitas; Los Hermanos Dinamita Junior
- Former members: El Hijo de Cien Caras
- Debut: 2006

Los Capos Junior (Spanish for "The Junior Bosses") is a Mexican professional wrestling group, called a stable, which is working on the Mexican Independent circuit, including regular appearances for International Wrestling Revolution Group (IWRG). The group works as a rudo (term used for wrestlers who portray the "bad guys") faction and often teams together for tag team or Trios (three man team) matches. The storyline behind team is that they are all sons of one of the original Los Capos, Cien Caras and Máscara Año 2000, although only one of the four members have been confirmed as being a blood relative while two others were definitely not. The stable includes Cien Caras Jr. (not a son), Hijo de Máscara Año 2000 (possibly a son) and Máscara Año 2000 Jr. (a son). El Hijo de Cien Caras was a part of the group until his death in 2010. Los Capos have at times also been billed as Los Hermanos Dinamita ("The Dynamite Brothers") leading this team being called Los Hermanos Dinamita Junior or Los Junior Dinamitas.

== History ==
Los Junior Capos started out with two wrestlers who paid Carmelo Reyes González, better known under the ring name Cien Caras for the use of his ring name and mask design to become Cien Caras Jr. and El Hijo de Cien Caras (Literally "The Son of Cien Caras"). The two first began working together in Guadalajara, Jalisco where they had both previous worked under other identities. Early on in the life of Los Junior Capos the duo defeated Flash I and Flash II (Note: Neither of them are to be confused with Fuego, who worked as Flash before changing his name.) to win the Occidente ("Western") Tag Team Championship on December 11, 2005. In the subsequent years Los Capos Junior would only defend the tag team titles on a few occasions, against the team of El Sagrado and El Texano Jr. in 2006 and Leon Blanco and Rayman in 2007. The fact that the team held the championship for a total of 545 days is more a reflection of how infrequent the titles were defended and Los Capos Junior working together than anything else. Their reign was ended on March 25, 2007 when El Sagrado and Rayman defeated them to win the belts. Around 2007/2008 Los Capos Junior began working for International Wrestling Revolution Group (IWRG) where they began teaming with Máscara Año 2000 Jr., son of Máscara Año 2000, and thus "storyline" cousin of Los Junior Capos. In IWRG Hijo de Cien Caras and Máscara Año 2000 Jr. teamed together on a regular basis, and on May 31, 2007 they defeated the team of El Felino and La Pantera to win the IWRG Intercontinental Tag Team Championship. This marked the beginning of what would be the longest reign of any IWRG Intercontinental Tag Team Champions, 801 days in total. For over two years Los Capos Junior defended such teams as Electroshock and El Hijo de Aníbal, Pierroth and Hijo del Pierroth, El Hijo del Solitario and Hijo de Aníbal, Heavy Metal and Negro Casas, Rayo de Jalisco Jr. and Hijo de Aníbal, Dr. Wagner Jr. and Silver King, Los Cowboys (Silver King and El Dandy), El Fantasma and Fantasma Jr., Scorpio Jr. and Zumbido (twice), Alrquin and Hijo del Pierroth and Los Headhunters between 2007 and 2009. On August 9, 2009 they lost the championship to Scorpio Jr. and Ricky Cruzz. In April, 2010 the Mexico State wrestling commission stripped the team of Black Terry, Dr. Cerebro and Cerebro Negro of the Distrito Federal Trios Championship as Cerebro Negro had not wrestled in the State of Mexico for 90 days. Hijo de Máscara Año 2000 and Máscara Año 2000 Jr. teamed up with their father for the tournament, qualifying for the finals by defeating first the team of Chico Che, Ultraman Jr. and Zatura and then Brazo de Plata, Brazo Metálico and Hijo del Brazo de Plata to qualify for the finals of the tournament. The following week Los Máscaras Año 2000 lost to the team of Los Gringos VIP (Avisman, El Hijo del Diablo and Gringo Loco) in the finals of the tournament.

AAA wrestler Silver King showed up for the show, allegedly to promote the movie "Nacho Libre II" but ended up starting an interpromotional feud between AAA and IWRG. Los Junior Dinamitas quickly came to the defense of IWRG, wrestling against Silver King and other AAA representatives such as Alex Koslov, Chessman and Cibernético. During AAA's Triplemanía XVIII Los Junior Dinamitas made a surprise appearance moments after Silver King and Último Gladiador won the AAA World Tag Team Championship to challenge the new champions. This marked the first time IWRG wrestlers appeared on AAA television. On June 26, 2010 the team of Hijo de Cien Caras and Máscara Año 2000 Jr. regained the IWRG Intercontinental Tag Team Championship when they defeated the team of Pirata Morgan and Hijo de Pirata Morgan. Los Junior Capos did challenge for the AAA World Tag Team Championship on August 19, 2010 but were defeated by champions Silver King and Ultimo Maniaco. The tag team championship reign lasted until November of that year when Los Piratos regained the titles. On November 29, 2010 Hijo de Cien Caras, was assassinated in Coyoacán, Mexico City. Until the death of Hijo de Cien Caras Hijo de Máscara Año 2000 had only worked with the rest of Los Capos Juniors on occasion, but became a regular member of the trio afterwards. In September, 2011 IWRG held a trios tournament to determine the next challengers for the IWRG Intercontinental Trios Championship. In the preliminary round Los Capos Junior outlasted the teams of Los Perros del Mal (Bestia 666, Damian 666 and X-Fly) and Los Psycho Circus (Monster Clown, Murder Clown and Psycho Clown) to earn a match for the championship at a later date. On December 1, 2011 Los Capos Junior defeated Los Perros del Mal to win the IWRG Intercontinental Championship. On December 16, 2011, at AAA's Guerra de Titanes pay-per-view, Máscara Año 2000 Jr. formed the stable El Consejo ("The Council", referring to CMLL without using the acronym) with former CMLL workers El Texano Jr. and Toscano. Following the event Máscara Año 2000 Jr. teamed less with the other Capos Junior and more with El Consejo, but did team up with them on May 27, 2012 where the trio lost the Trios championship to La Familia de Tijuana (Damian 666, Headhunter A and X-Fly).

In March 2011 Cien Caras Jr. and Hijo de Máscara Año 2000 participated in Universal Wrestling Entertainment's (UWE) Tag Team Championship tournament. In the first round they defeated the team of Scorpio Jr. and Zumbido, in the quarter-finals they defeated the team of Los Psycho Circus (Murder Clown and Psycho Clown), but lost their semi-final match to Los Guerreros del Infierno (Atlantis and Último Guerrero). Los Capos Junior, in this case Hijo de Máscara Año 2000 and Cien Caras Jr., participated in the 2012 Gran Legado ("Great Legacy") tournament, but lost to the father/son team of Pirata Morgan and Hijo de Pirata Morgan. Los Capos Junior, in this case Hijo de Máscara Año 2000 and Cien Caras Jr., participated in the 2012 Guerra de Empresas ("Battle of the promotions") tournament, representing IWRG. The team qualified for the finals by defeating La Familia de Tijuana (Damian 666 and X-Fly) and El Consejo (Argos and El Texano Jr.) but lost to Cibernético and La Parka (representing AAA) in the finals.|

== Championships and accomplishments ==
Championships won as a team are listed.

- CMLL Guadalajara (Note: CMLL runs a wrestling school in Guadalajara, attending the school does not automatically put them under contract with CMLL)
  - Occidente Tag Team Championship (1 time) – El Hijo de Cien Caras and Cien Caras Jr.
- International Wrestling Revolution Group
  - IWRG Intercontinental Tag Team Championship (2 times) – El Hijo de Cien Caras and Máscara Año 2000 Jr.
  - IWRG Intercontinental Trios Championship (1 time) – Cien Caras Jr., Hijo de Máscara Año 2000 and Máscara Año 2000 Jr.
