= Legado Final (2011) =

2011 International Wrestling Revolution Group event

Legado Final (2012)
- Official IWRG poster for the event
- Promotion: International Wrestling Revolution Group
- Date: June 2, 2011
- City: Naucalpan, State of Mexico
- Venue: Arena Naucalpan

Event chronology
← Previous; La Revancha	Next → Rey del Ring

IWRG Legado Final chronology
← Previous; First	Next → 2012

Legado Final (2011) (Spanish for "Final Legacy") was an annual professional wrestling major event produced by the Mexican professional wrestling promotion International Wrestling Revolution Group (IWRG), which took place on June 2, 2011 in Arena Naucalpan, Naucalpan, State of Mexico, Mexico. The main event of the show was the Torneo de Legado Final ("The Final Legacy Tournament"), a 12-man., six-team Torneo cibernetico. Of the six teams in the tournament five were father/son teams and the sixth was scheduled to be but El Hijo del Solar had to be replaced for unknown reasons by Fresero, Jr. who teamed up with El Solar. The remaining teams were El Brazo and El Hijo del Brazo, Pirata Morgan and El Hijo de Pirata Morgan, Pantera and El Hijo del Pantera, Negro Navarro and Trauma I and finally Máscara Año 2000 and Máscara Año 2000, Jr.

== Production ==
=== Background ===
Professional wrestling has been a generational tradition in Lucha libre since its inception early in the 20th century, with a great deal of second or third-generation wrestlers following in the footsteps of their fathers or mothers. Several lucha libre promotions honor those traditions, often with annual tournaments such as Consejo Mundial de Lucha Libre's La Copa Junior. The Naucalpan, State of Mexico based International Wrestling Revolution Group (IWRG) has held a Legado Final (Spanish for "Final Legacy") on an annual basis since 2011, with the 2015 show marking the fifth time they used the name. The Legado Final show, as well as the majority of the IWRG shows in general will be held in "Arena Naucalpan", owned by the promoters of IWRG. In addition to legitimate second-generation wrestlers there are a number of wrestlers who are presented as second or third-generation wrestlers, normally masked wrestlers promoted as "Juniors". These wrestlers normally pay a royalty or fee for the use of the name, using the name of an established star to get attention from fans and promoters. Examples of such instances of fictional family relationships include Arturo Beristain, also known as El Hijo del Gladiador ("The Son of El Gladiador") who was not related to the original El Gladiador, or El Hijo de Cien Caras who paid Cien Caras for the rights to use the name.

=== Storylines ===
The event featured four professional wrestling matches with different wrestlers, where some were involved in pre-existing scripted feuds or storylines and others simply put together by the matchmakers without a backstory. Being a professional wrestling event matches are not won legitimately through athletic competition; they are instead won via predetermined outcomes to the matches that is kept secret from the general public. Wrestlers portray either heels (the bad guys, referred to as Rudos in Mexico) or faces (fan favorites or Técnicos in Mexico).

The main event match, the Legado Final tournament celebrated the fact that lucha libre is a family tradition in Mexico, with many second or third-generation wrestlers competing. The Legado Final match rules dictated that the father of each team would compete in a match where there were two wrestlers in the ring and the remaining four were on the outside to be tagged in during the match. When someone was eliminated, by pinfall, submission, disqualification or count out the son would enter the match. The last person remaining in the match after all 10 or 11 wrestlers were eliminated would be declared the victor along with his team mate. Lucha Libre has a long of storyline, or fictional family relationships, often when a young wrestler either pays for, or is given, the ring name of a well established wrestlers, such as Cien Caras, Jr. actually paying Cien Caras for the use of the name. Officially wrestling promotions do not hint at the fact that not all "family relations" are not real, keeping the illusion of the characters. For the 2011 Legado Final tournament IWRG booked six father/son teams that actually, legitimately were blood relations to each other. The six teams were El Brazo and El Hijo del Brazo, Pirata Morgan and El Hijo de Pirata Morgan, Pantera and El Hijo del Pantera, Negro Navarro and Trauma I, Máscara Año 2000 and Máscara Año 2000, Jr. and El Solar and El Hijo del Solar. On the night of the show El Hijo del Solar was either not in the arena, or was unable to compete and was replaced by another second-generation wrestler Fresero, Jr. who would team up with El Solar for the match.

== Results ==
No.	Results	Stipulations
1	Dinamic Black and Tritón defeated Dark Devil and Imposible – two falls to zero	Tag team best two-out-of-three falls tag team match
2	Freelance, Golden Magic and Mike Segura defeated Alan Extreme, Carta Brava, Jr. and Comando Negro – two falls to one	Best two-out-of-three falls six-man tag team match
3	Multifacético defeated Dr. Cerebro (C) – two falls to one	Best two-out-of-three falls match for the WWS World Welterweight Championship
4	Los Brazos (El Brazo and El Hijo del Brazo) defeated Los Piratas (Pirata Morgan and El Hijo de Pirata Morgan), Los Panteras (Pantera and El Hijo del Pantera), La Dinastia de la Muerte (Negro Navarro and Trauma I), Máscara Año 2000 and Máscara Año 2000, Jr. and El Solar and Fresero, Jr.	2011 Torneo El Gran Legado 12-man Torneo cibernetico elimination Match

=== Torneo El Gran Legado order of elimination ===
#	Eliminated	Eliminated by	Time
1	Negro Navarro	El Solar	
2	El Solar	Pirata Morgan	
3	Pirata Morgan		
4	El Brazo		
5	Máscara Año 2000	Trauma I	
6	El Pantera	Máscara Año 2000, Jr.	
7	Fresero, Jr.	Máscara Año 2000, Jr.	
8	Máscara Año 2000, Jr.		
9	El Hijo del Pantera		
10	Trauma I	El Hijo del Pirata Morgan	
11	Hijo de Pirata Morgan	El Hijo del Brazo	
12	Winner	El Hijo de Brazo	
