= Legado Final (2017) =

2017 International Wrestling Revolution Group event

- Official poster for the event
- Promotion: International Wrestling Revolution Group
- Date: July 30, 2017
- City: Naucalpan, State of Mexico
- Venue: Arena Naucalpan

Event chronology
← Previous; Prisión Fatal	Next → Máscara vs. Máscara

IWRG Legado Final chronology
← Previous; Legado Final (2015)	Next → TBA

El Legado Final (2017) (Spanish for "The Final Legacy") was a major annual professional wrestling event produced by Mexican professional wrestling promotion International Wrestling Revolution Group (IWRG), which took place on July 30, 2017, in Arena Naucalpan, Naucalpan, State of Mexico, Mexico. The main event of the show was the Torneo de Legado Final ("The Final Legacy Tournament"), a 16-man Torneo cibernetico. The Legado Final match saw eight teams compete where all teams were made up of fathers and sons teaming together in a multi-man elimination match.

For the 2017 tournament Villano V Jr. teamed up with his uncle Villano IV, as his father (Villano V) was retired for health reasons. While there are examples of some wrestlers paying to be a "junior" of an established wrestler it is believed that all wrestlers billed as sons for the 2017 tournament actually were sons, although it has not been definitely verified for the masked competitors. Villano V Jr. and his uncle won the tournament by outlasting the teams of Bombero Infernal Jr./Bombero Infernal, Diablo Jr./El Hijo del Diablo, Golden Magic/Mr. Magic, El Hijo de Pirata Morgan/Pirata Morgan, El Hijo del Pantera/Pantera, Trauma I and Negro Navarro and Warrior Jr. /Black Warrior.

== Production ==
=== Background ===
Professional wrestling has been a generational tradition in Lucha libre since its inception early in the 20th century, with a great deal of second or third-generation wrestlers following in the footsteps of their fathers or mothers. Several lucha libre promotions honor those traditions, often with annual tournaments such as Consejo Mundial de Lucha Libre's La Copa Junior. The Naucalpan, State of Mexico based International Wrestling Revolution Group (IWRG) has held a Legado Final (Spanish for "Final Legacy") on an almost annual basis since 2011, with the 2017 show marking the sixth time they used the name. The Legado Final show, as well as the majority of the IWRG shows in general will be held in "Arena Naucalpan", owned by the promoters of IWRG. In addition to legitimate second-generation wrestlers there are a number of wrestlers who are presented as second or third-generation wrestlers, normally masked wrestlers promoted as "Juniors". These wrestlers normally pay a royalty or fee for the use of the name, using the name of an established star to get attention from fans and promoters. Examples of such instances of fictional family relationships include Arturo Beristain, also known as El Hijo del Gladiador ("The Son of El Gladiador) who was not related to the original El Gladiador, or El Hijo de Cien Caras who paid Cien Caras for the rights to use the name.

=== Storylines ===
The Legado Final event featured six professional wrestling matches with different wrestlers involved in pre-existing scripted feuds, plots and storylines. Wrestlers were portrayed as either heels (referred to as rudos in Mexico, those that portray the "bad guys") or faces (técnicos in Mexico, the "good guy" characters) as they followed a series of tension-building events, which culminated in a wrestling match or series of matches.

== Event ==
For the Legado Final match the eight fathers started in the ring while the second-generation wrestlers would wait on the floor, only entering the match when their father was eliminated. Black Warrior, Bombero Infernal, El Hijo del Diablo, Mr. Magic, Negro Navarro, Pantera, Pirata Morgan, and Villano IV all entered the ring, while Bombero Infernal Jr., Diablo Jr., Golden Magic, El Hijo del Pantera, El Hijo de Pirata Morgan, Trauma I, Villano V Jr. and Warrior Jr. remained outside. After 14 eliminations the Legado Final tournament came down to Trauma II and Villano V Jr., leading to Villano V Jr. winning the match moments later. After his victory, Villano V Jr. made a challenged Mr. Electro to defend the IWRG Intercontinental Heavyweight Championship at a future date.

== Results ==
No.	Results	Stipulations
1	Lunatik Xtreme and Bull Power defeated Fly Tiger and Voltar	Best two-out-of-three-falls tag team match
2	Tortuga Mike defeated Pantera del Japon	Singles match
3	Demonio Infernal, Kempo Jr. and Monaguillo defeated Dinamic Black, El Hijo del Alebrije and Shaolin	Best two-out-of-three falls six-man tag team match
4	Danny Casas defeated Veneno by disqualificat6ion	Singles match
5	Black Dragon, El Hijo de Dos Caras and Imposible defeated Gallo Frances, Herodes Jr. and Trauma II	Relevos Increíbles match
6	Villano V Jr. and Villano IV defeated Bombero Infernal Jr./Bombero Infernal, Diablo Jr./El Hijo del Diablo, Golden Magic/Mr. Magic, El Hijo de Pirata Morgan/Pirata Morgan, El Hijo del Pantera/Pantera, Trauma I and Negro Navarro and Warrior Jr. /Black Warrior	2017 Torneo El Gran Legado 16-man Torneo cibernetico elimination Match
