= Legado Final (2012) =

2012 International Wrestling Revolution Group event

- Official poster showing both generations in the main event.
- Promotion: International Wrestling Revolution Group
- Date: June 24, 2012
- City: Naucalpan, State of Mexico
- Venue: Arena Naucalpan
- Tagline(s): Padres y Hijos ("Fathers and Sons")

Event chronology
← Previous; 15 Aniversario de CIMA	Next → Guerra de Empresas

IWRG Legado Final chronology
← Previous; 2011	Next → 2015

El Legado Final (2012) (Spanish for "The Final Legacy") was an annual professional wrestling major event produced by Mexican professional wrestling promotion International Wrestling Revolution Group (IWRG), which took place on June 24, 2012 in Arena Naucalpan, Naucalpan, State of Mexico, Mexico. The main event of the show was the Torneo de Legado Final ("The Final Legacy Tournament"), a 12-man Torneo cibernetico. The match saw six teams compete, five of which we scheduled to be father/son teams and one a set of second-generation wrestlers. Ultraman was originally supposed to team with his son, Ultraman, Jr. but his son was unable to compete and had to be replaced with Danny Casas, a third-generation wrestler from the Casas wrestling family. The other teams were Bestia 666 and Damian 666, El Hijo del Pantera and El Pantera, Hijo de Pirata Morgan and Pirata Morgan, Máscara Sagrada and Máscara Sagrada, Jr. The team of Los Hermanos Dinamita, Jr. (Cien Caras, Jr. and Hijo de Máscara Año 2000) is promoted as the sons of Cien Caras and Máscara Año 2000, but it has been verified that Cien Caras, Jr. is not related, but instead someone using the ring character with permission. The Legado Final match rules dictated that the father of each team would compete in a match where there were two wrestlers in the ring and the remaining four were on the outside to be tagged in during the match. When someone was eliminated, by pinfall, submission, disqualification or count out the son would enter the match. The last person remaining in the match after all 10 or 11 wrestlers were eliminated would be declared the victor along with his team mate.

== Production ==
=== Background ===
professional wrestling has been a generational tradition in Lucha libre since its inception early in the 20th century, with a great deal of second or third-generation wrestlers following in the footsteps of their fathers or mothers. Several lucha libre promotions honor those traditions, often with annual tournaments such as Consejo Mundial de Lucha Libre's La Copa Junior. The Naucalpan, State of Mexico based International Wrestling Revolution Group (IWRG) has held a Legado Final (Spanish for "Final Legacy") on an annual basis since 2011, with the 2015 show marking the fifth time they used the name. The Legado Final show, as well as the majority of the IWRG shows in general will be held in "Arena Naucalpan", owned by the promoters of IWRG. In addition to legitimate second-generation wrestlers there are a number of wrestlers who are presented as second or third-generation wrestlers, normally masked wrestlers promoted as "Juniors". These wrestlers normally pay a royalty or fee for the use of the name, using the name of an established star to get attention from fans and promoters. Examples of such instances of fictional family relationships include Arturo Beristain, also known as El Hijo del Gladiador ("The Son of El Gladiador") who was not related to the original El Gladiador, or El Hijo de Cien Caras who paid Cien Caras for the rights to use the name.

=== Storylines ===
The event featured four professional wrestling matches with different wrestlers involved in pre-existing scripted feuds, plots and storylines. Wrestlers were portrayed as either heels (referred to as rudos in Mexico, those that portray the "bad guys") or faces (técnicos in Mexico, the "good guy" characters) as they followed a series of tension-building events, which culminated in a wrestling match or series of matches.

== Results ==
No.	Results	Stipulations
1	Eita and Imposible defeated Centvrión and Charly Madrid	Tag team best two-out-of-three falls tag team match
2	Chicano and Dr. Cerebro defeated Carta Brava, Jr. and Heddi Karaoui	Tag team best two-out-of-three falls tag team match
3	La Familia de Tijuana (Headhunter A, Super Nova and X-Fly) defeated Danny Casas, Niko and Veneno	Best two-out-of-three falls six-man tag team match
4	Los Piratas (Hijo de Pirata Morgan and Pirata Morgan) defeated Danny Casas and Ultraman, El Hijo del Pantera and El Pantera, La Familia de Tijuana (Bestia 666 and Damian 666), Los Hermanos Dinamita, Jr. (Cien Caras, Jr. and Hijo de Máscara Año 2000), Máscara Sagrada and Máscara Sagrada, Jr.	2012 Torneo El Gran Legado 12-man Torneo cibernetico elimination Match

=== Torneo El Gran Legado order of elimination ===
#	Eliminated	Eliminated by	Time
1	El Pantera		
2	Ultraman		
3	Cien Caras, Jr.		
4	Máscara Sagrada		
5	Damian 666		
6	Pirata Morgan		
7	Danny Casas		
8	El Hijo del Pantera		
9	Máscara Sagrada, Jr.		
10	Bestia 666		
11	Hijo de Máscara Año 2000	Hijo de Pirata Morgan	
12	Winner	Hijo de Pirata Morgan	
