= Universo 2000 Jr. =

Mexican professional wrestler

Personal information
- Born: Unrevealed (Note: Traditionally Mexican sources will not report on the birth name of a masked wrestler who has never been unmasked in the ring.) Lagos de Moreno, Jalisco, Mexico
- Family: Universo 2000 (father); Cien Caras (uncle); Máscara Año 2000 (uncle); Sansón (cousin); El Cuatrero (cousin); Forastero (cousin); Hijo de Máscara Año 2000 (cousin)

Professional wrestling career
- Ring names: Universo 2000 Jr.; Universo Dos Mil Jr.
- Debut: October 19, 2009
- Retired: 2022

Universo 2000 Jr./Universo Dos Mil Jr. is the ring name of a Mexican professional wrestler, best known for working for Consejo Mundial de Lucha Libre (CMLL) based in Mexico City where he portrayed a heel ("bad guy") character. He is a second-generation professional wrestler, part of the Reyes family that includes his father Universo 2000, uncles Cien Caras and Máscara Año 2000, as well as cousins El Cuatrero, Sansón, Forastero, and Máscara Año 2000 Jr. His birth name is not a matter of public record, which is a strong tradition for masked wrestlers in Mexico, where their private lives are kept a secret from the professional wrestling fans. In CMLL he won the 2019 edition of La Copa Junior.

== Personal life ==
Universo 2000 Jr. is the son of Andrés Reyes González, a professional wrestler known under the ring name Universo 2000. As Universo 2000 Jr. is an enmascarado or "masked wrestler" his birth name is not a matter of public record, a tradition in lucha libre where the personal lives of masked wrestlers are kept out of the spot light. His father, Andrés, and his uncles Carmelo (known as Cien Caras) and Jesús (Máscara Año 2000) were established professional wrestling headliners in Mexico. Several Reyes family members became professional wrestlers including cousins Forastero, El Cuatrero and Sansón, and El Hijo de Máscara Año 2000. Despite using the names El Hijo de Cien Caras ("The Son of Cien Caras") and Cien Caras, Jr. neither wrestler were actually related to the Reyes family but instead paid for the rights to use the ring characters and masks. The Mini-Estrella Pequeño Universo 2000 is also not a Reyes family member but a Mini who was allowed to use the name and mask some years ago when Universo 2000 still wrestled in CMLL and continues to use the character to this date.

== Professional wrestling career ==
The earliest recorded results for Universo 2000 Jr. is from late 2009 as he teamed up with his uncle Máscara Año 2000 and El Hijo del Cien Caras on a show in Nuevo Laredo, Tamaulipas, Mexico. While working sporadically early in his career, he would usually team with his family. On June 26, 2011 he teamed up with his father to defeat Máscara Sagrada and El Hijo del Máscara Sagrada on a show in his home town of Lagos de Moreno, Jalisco. In September 2012 he participated in a La Copa Junior battle royal as part of International Wrestling League's second anniversary show, won Kung Fu Jr.

=== International Wrestling Revolution Group (2014–2015) ===
In 2014, Universo 2000 Jr. and his cousin El Hijo de Máscara Año 2000 began working for International Wrestling Revolution Group (IWRG) under the name Los Primos Dinamitas, or "The Dynamite Cousins" inspired by the name Los Hermanos Dinamita ("The Dynamite Brothers") that his father and uncles used when working as a team. On November 2, 2014, Universo Jr. was one of ten wrestlers who risked his mask on the outcome of that year's El Castillo del Terror steel cage match. He escaped the cage early on, watching from the outside as Golden Magic defeated Kenshi Kabuki to unmask him. He later competed for the number one contendership for the IWRG Junior de Juniors Championship, but was eliminated by eventual winner El Hijo de Dos Caras. Los Primos Dinamita competed in the 2015 Guerra de Familias tournament, but were eliminated by El Hijo de Dos Casas and Súper Nova in the first round. On July 19, 2015 Los Primos Dinamitas competed in a tournament for the vacant IWRG Intercontinental Tag Team Championship. The two defeated Eterno and Hip Hop Man in the first round, Los Crazy Americans (Coloso Chris and Principe Orion) in the semi-finals but lost to El Hijo del Pantera and El Pantera in the finals. In one of his final appearances in IWRG, Universo 2000 Jr. teamed up with his father for IWRG's Legado Final tournament, a tournament for father/son tournament. The Universos were eliminated halfway through the tournament.

=== Consejo Mundial de Lucha Libre (2017–2021) ===
After his stint in IWRG, Universo 2000 Jr. began working regularly for Consejo Mundial de Lucha Libre (CMLL), the same promotion his cousins worked for. In his debut math Universo 2000 Jr., Disturbio and Virus lost to Esfinge, Fuego, and Pegasso. While he was not positioned as a full-time member of Nuevo Generacion Dinamaitas he did team up with his cousins on occasion early in his CMLL stint. The 2018 Gran Alternativa ("Great Alternative") tournament was Universo 2000 Jr.'s first major exposure in CMLL as he teamed up with his uncle Máscara Año 2000 for the tournament. The Reyes lost to eventual tournament winners Templario and Último Guerrero on the first night of the tournament. He followed that up by participating in the 2019 Reyes del Aire ("King of the Air") tournament, where he was eliminated by Black Panther.

He was also given a chance to qualify for a Rey del Inframundo ("King of the Underworld") championship match, but was eliminated early on in the ten-man torneo cibernetico elimination match. In December 2019 Universo 2000 Jr. outlasted Esfinge, Black Panther, Espanto Jr., Magnus, Príncipe Odín Jr., Stigma, Robin, Halcón Suriano Jr. and Bengala to qualify for the finals of the 2019 La Copa Junior tournament, followed by defeating Guerrero Maya Jr. to win the tournament. He disappeared from CMLL line-ups after September 2021, possibly due to injury, and was only recorded in one independent event thereafter, but expressed interest in a return as recently as 2025.

== Championships and accomplishments ==
- Consejo Mundial de Lucha Libre
  - La Copa Junior (2019)
