= Cien Caras (disambiguation) =

Cien Caras (born 1949) is a former Mexican professional wrestler. Cien Caras may refer to:

- Cien Caras Jr. (born 1976), Mexican professional wrestler
- El Hijo de Cien Caras (1976–2010), Mexican professional wrestler
