= IWRG Intercontinental Tag Team Championship =

Professional wrestling championship by International Wrestling Revolution Group

- One of the belts representing the championship

Details
- Promotion: International Wrestling Revolution Group
- Date established: January 2, 2000
- Current champions: Jack Morris and Tirano
- Date won: October 8, 2026
Statistics
- First champions: Yasushi Kanda and Susumu Mochizuki
- Most reigns: Los Megas (3 reigns) (Mega and Ultra Mega)
- Longest reign: Bryce Benjamin and Marshe Rockett (875 days)
- Shortest reign: American Gigolo and MAZADA (9 days)

The IWRG Intercontinental Tag Team Championship (Campeonato Intercontinental de Parejas IWRG in Spanish) is a professional wrestling tag team championship promoted by the Mexican professional wrestling promotion International Wrestling Revolution Group (IWRG) since 2000. As it is a professional wrestling championship, the championship was not won not by actual competition, but by a scripted ending to a match determined by the bookers and match makers. (Note: Hornbaker (2016) p. 550: "Professional wrestling is a sport in which match finishes are predetermined. Thus, win–loss records are not indicative of a wrestler's genuine success based on their legitimate abilities – but on now much, or how little they were pushed by promoters") On occasion the promotion declares a championship vacant, which means there is no champion at that point in time. This can either be due to a storyline, (Note: Duncan & Will (2000) p. 271, Chapter: Texas: NWA American Tag Team Title [World Class, Adkisson] "Championship held up and rematch ordered because of the interference of manager Gary Hart") or real life issues such as a champion suffering an injury being unable to defend the championship, (Note: Duncan & Will (2000) p. 20, Chapter: (United States: 19th Century & widely defended titles – NWA, WWF, AWA, IW, ECW, NWA) NWA/WCW TV Title "Rhodes stripped on 85/10/19 for not defending the belt after having his leg broken by Ric Flair and Ole & Arn Anderson") or leaving the company. (Note: Duncan & Will (2000) p. 201, Chapter: (Memphis, Nashville) Memphis: USWA Tag Team Title "Vacant on 93/01/18 when Spike leaves the USWA.")

Jack Morris and Tirano are the current champions, having defeated Mexa Boy's (Aguila Oriental and Noisy Boy) in a tournament final on October 8, 2026 to win the vacant titles. A total of 61 individuals have held the championship, 35 different teams for a combined 44 reigns. The tag team championship was created in 2000 when Yasushi Kanda and Susumu Mochizuki defeated Fantasy and Black Dragon to win the tournament. Bryce Benjamin and Marshe Rockett hold the record for the longest reign, 875 days, while the team of American Gigolo and MAZADA is the team to have held the title the shortest time, nine days. Los Megas (Mega and Ultra Mega) is the only team to have held the title three times while Dr. Cerebro has held it three times as well but with two different partners.

== Title history ==
Key
No.	Overall reign number
Reign	Reign number for the specific team—reign numbers for the individuals are in parentheses, if different
Days	Number of days held
N/A	Unknown information
(NLT)	Championship change took place "no later than" the date listed
†	Championship change is unrecognized by the promotion
+	Current reign is changing daily

No.	Champion	Championship change			Reign statistics		Notes	Ref.
No.	Champion	Date	Event	Location	Reign	Days	Notes	Ref.
1	Yasushi Kanda and Susumu Mochizuki	January 2, 2000	IWRG show	Naucalpan, State of Mexico	1	63	Defeated Fantasy and Black Dragon in a tournament final to become the first champions.	
2	Fantasy and Star Boy	March 5, 2000	IWRG show	Naucalpan, State of Mexico	1	238		
3	Los Megas (Mega and Ultra Mega)	October 29, 2000	IWRG show	Naucalpan, State of Mexico	1	224		
4	Tokyo Gurentai (MAZADA and NOZAWA)	June 10, 2001	IWRG show	Naucalpan, State of Mexico	1	137		
5	Fantasy and Star Boy	October 25, 2001	IWRG show	Naucalpan, State of Mexico	2	126	Titles awarded by forfeit when Nozawa failed to appear for a scheduled title defence. Fantasy and Star Boy then defeated Mazada and Paramedico in an exhibition match.	
6	Los Megas (Mega and Ultra Mega)	February 28, 2002	IWRG show	Naucalpan, State of Mexico	2	73		
7	Dr. Cerebro and Bombero Infernal	May 12, 2002	IWRG show	Naucalpan, State of Mexico	1	(Note: The exact date on which the title change took place is not known, which means the title reign lasted between 234 and 598 days.)	Titles awarded by forfeit when Mega failed to appear for a scheduled title defense.	
8	Los Megas (Mega and Ultra Mega)	2003	IWRG show	Naucalpan, State of Mexico	3	(Note: The exact date on which the title change took place is not known, which means the title reign lasted between 186 and 550 days.)	The exact date of the title change has not been documented.	
9	Dr. Cerebro and Cerebro Negro	July 4, 2004	IWRG show	Naucalpan, State of Mexico	1 (2, 1)	151		
10	American Gigolo and MAZADA	December 2, 2004	IWRG show	Naucalpan, State of Mexico	1 (1, 2)	24		
11	Los Cerebros (Dr. Cerebro and Cerebro Negro)	December 26, 2004	IWRG show	Naucalpan, State of Mexico	2 (3, 2)	550		
12	El Felino and Pantera	June 29, 2006	IWRG show	Naucalpan, State of Mexico	1	336		
13	Los Junior Dinamitas (El Hijo de Cien Caras and Máscara Año 2000, Jr.)	May 31, 2007	IWRG show	Naucalpan, State of Mexico	1	801		
14	Ricky Cruzz and Scorpio, Jr.	August 9, 2009	IWRG show	Naucalpan, State of Mexico	1	158		
—	Vacated	January 14, 2010	—	—	—	—	Titles vacated as neither champion had worked for IWRG in months.	
15	Los Piratas (Pirata Morgan and Hijo de Pirata Morgan)	January 31, 2010	IWRG show	Naucalpan, State of Mexico	1	140	Defeated Negro Navarro and Trauma I in the finals of a tournament to crown new champions.	
16	Los Junior Dinamitas (El Hijo de Cien Caras and Máscara Año 2000, Jr.)	June 20, 2010	IWRG show	Naucalpan, State of Mexico	2	147		
17	Los Piratas (Pirata Morgan and Hijo de Pirata Morgan)	November 14, 2010	IWRG show	Naucalpan, State of Mexico	2	490		
18	Negro Navarro and Trauma I	March 18, 2012	IWRG show	Naucalpan, State of Mexico	1	511		
19	La Familia de Tijuana (Eterno and X-Fly)	August 11, 2013	Festival de las Máscaras	Naucalpan, State of Mexico	1	21		
20	Los Traumas (Trauma I and Trauma II)	September 1, 2013	Zona XXI	Naucalpan, State of Mexico	1 (2, 1)	88		
21	Alan Extreme and Veneno	November 28, 2013	IWRG show	Naucalpan, State of Mexico	1	174		
22	Los Gringos VIP (Apolo Estrada, Jr. and El Hijo del Diablo)	May 21, 2014	IWRG show	Naucalpan, State of Mexico	1	25		
23	Los Oficiales (Oficial AK-47 and Oficial 911)	June 15, 2014	IWRG show	Naucalpan, State of Mexico	1	168		
—	Vacated	November 30, 2014	—	—	—	—	Titles vacated when Oficial AK-47 failed to show up for a title defense.	
24	Canis Lupus and Eterno	December 25, 2014	IWRG show	Naucalpan, State of Mexico	1	31	Defeated Chicano and Imposible in the finals of a tournament to win the vacant title.	
25	Chicano and Danny Casas	January 25, 2015	IWRG show	Naucalpan, State of Mexico	1	171		
—	Vacated	July 15, 2015	—	—	—	—	Title declared vacant by IWRG.	
26	Los Panteras (El Hijo del Pantera and El Pantera)	July 19, 2015	IWRG show	Naucalpan, State of Mexico	1 (1, 2)	59	Defeated Hijo de Máscara Año 2000 and Universo 2000 Jr. in the finals of an eight-team tournament to win the vacant title.	
27	Los Gringos VIP (Apolo Estrada, Jr. and El Hijo del Diablo)	September 16, 2015	IWRG show	Naucalpan, State of Mexico	2	67		
28	Los Panteras (El Hijo del Pantera and El Pantera)	November 22, 2015	IWRG show	Naucalpan, State of Mexico	2 (2, 3)	294		
29	Chicano and Veneno	September 11, 2016	IWRG show	Naucalpan, State of Mexico	1 (2, 2)	168		
30	El Diablo Jr. I and Black Terry	September 11, 2016	IWRG show	Naucalpan, State of Mexico	1	190		
31	Black Warrior and Warrior Jr.	September 3, 2017	IWRG show	Naucalpan, State of Mexico	1	175		
32	Rokambole Jr. and Villano V Jr.	March 11, 2018	IWRG show	Naucalpan, State of Mexico	1	259		
33	Capo del Norte and Capo del Sur	November 25, 2018	IWRG show	Naucalpan, State of Mexico	1	37		
34	Los Oficiales (Oficial AK-47 and Oficial 911)	January 1, 2019	IWRG 23rd Anniversary Show	Naucalpan, State of Mexico	2	54		
—	Vacated	February 24, 2019	—	—	—	—	Championship vacated when Oficial 911 is unable to defend the championship.	
35	Aramís and Imposible	March 24, 2019	IWRG show	Naucalpan, State of Mexico	1	246	Defeated Heddi Karaoui and Death Metal to win the vacant championship.	
—	Vacated	November 25, 2019	—	—	—	—	Titles vacated for undisclosed reasons.	
36	Bryce Benjamin and Marshe Rockett	December 1, 2019	PALL 1st Anniversary Show	Naucalpan, State of Mexico	1	875	Won a six-team tag team tournament for the vacant championship	
37	The Golden Gods (Atomico Jr. and Golden Dragon)	April 24, 2022	GALLI Alianza 2	Melrose Park, Illinois	1	154	This was a three-way tag team match, also involving Bandido and Joey Marx.	
—	Vacated	September 25, 2022	—	—	—	—		
38	Los OGs (Joey Marx and Mason Conrad)	September 25, 2022	GALLI live event	Villa Park, Illinois	1	70	This was a four-way tag team match, also involving Los Jefes De Jefes (Golden Star and Sobrino Azteca), Bandolero and La Diva Salvaje, and Mr. Iguana and Mr. Leo.	
39	El Hijo de Canis Lupus and Rey Leon	December 4, 2022	GALLI Galliz Navidad 2022	Villa Park, Illinois	1	182		
40	Los Terribles Cerebros (Cerebro Negro and Cerebro Negro Jr.)	June 4, 2023	IWRG show	Naucalpan, State of Mexico	1 (3, 1)	406		
41	Mala Fama (Látigo and Toxin)	July 14, 2024	IWRG show	Naucalpan, State of Mexico	1	14		
42	El Hijo de Canis Lupus and Hell Boy	July 28, 2024	IWRG show	Naucalpan, State of Mexico	1 (2, 1)	157		
43	Mexa Boy's (Noisy Boy and Spider Fly)	January 1, 2025	IWRG Guerreros De Acero 2025	Naucalpan, State of Mexico	1	642	This was a three-way steel cage match that also involved Mala Fama (Látigo and Toxin).	
—	Vacated	October 5, 2026	—	—	—	—		
44	Jack Morris and Tirano	October 8, 2026	IWRG Thursday Night Wrestling	Naucalpan, State of Mexico	1	37+	Defeated Mexy Boy's (Aguila Oriental and Noisy Boy) in a tournament final for the vacant championship.	

== Combined reigns ==
As of 28 May 2026

†	Indicates the current champion
¤	The exact length of at least one title reign is too uncertain to calculate.

Rank	Team	No. of reigns	Combined days
1	Los Junior Dinamitas (El Hijo de Cien Caras and Máscara Año 2000, Jr.)	2	948
2	Bryce Benjamin and Marshe Rockett	1	875
3	Los Cerebros (Dr. Cerebro and Cerebro Negro)	2	701
4	Mexa Boy's (Noisy Boy and Spider Fly)	1	642
5	Pirata Morgan and Hijo de Pirata Morgan	2	630
6	Negro Navarro and Trauma I	1	511
7	Los Terribles Cerebros (Cerebro Negro and Cerebro Negro Jr.)	1	406
8	Fantasy and Star Boy	2	364
9	El Hijo del Pantera and El Pantera	2	354
10	El Felino and Pantera	1	336
11	Los Megas (Mega and Ultra Mega)	3	297 ¤
12	Rokambole Jr. and Villano V Jr.	1	259
13	Los Oficiales (Oficial AK-47 and Oficial 911)	2	222
14	Aramís and Imposible	1	246
15	El Diablo Jr. I and Black Terry	1	204
16	El Hijo de Canis Lupus and Rey Leon	1	182
17	Black Warrior and Warrior Jr.	1	175
18	Alan Extreme and Veneno	1	174
19	Chicano and Danny Casas	1	171
20	Chicano and Veneno	1	169
21	El Hijo de Canis Lupus and Hell Boy	1	157
22	The Golden Gods (Atomico Jr. and Golden Dragon)	1	154
23	MAZADA and NOZAWA	1	137
24	Apolo Estrada, Jr. and El Hijo del Diablo	2	92
25	Trauma I and Trauma II	1	88
26	Los OGs (Joey Marx and Mason Conrad)	1	70
27	Yasushi Kanda and Susumu Mochizuki	1	63
28	Ricky Cruzz and Scorpio, Jr.	1	58
29	Jack Morris and Tirano †	1	37+
30	Capo del Norte and Capo del Sur	1	37
31	Canis Lupus and Eterno	1	31
32	American Gigolo and MAZADA	1	24
33	Eterno and X-Fly	1	21
34	Mala Fama (Látigo and Toxin)	1	14
35	Dr. Cerebro and Bombero Infernal	1	N/A ¤

=== By wrestler ===
Rank	Wrestler	No. of reigns	Combined days
1	Cerebro Negro	3	1,107
2	El Hijo de Cien Caras	2	948
2	Máscara Año 2000, Jr.	2	948
4	Bryce Benjamin	1	875
4	Marshe Rockett	1	875
6	Pantera / Pantera II	3	747
7	Dr. Cerebro	3	701 ¤
8	Noisy Boy	1	642
8	Spider Fly	1	642
10	Pirata Morgan	2	630
10	Hijo de Pirata Morgan	2	630
12	Trauma I	2	599
13	Negro Navarro	1	511
14	Cerebro Negro Jr.	1	406
15	Fantasy	2	364
15	Star Boy	2	364
17	El Hijo del Pantera	2	354
18	Veneno	1	342
19	El Hijo de Canis Lupus	2	339
19	Chicano	1	339
21	El Felino	1	336
22	Mega	3	297 ¤
22	Ultra Mega	3	297 ¤
24	Rokambole Jr.	1	259
24	Villano V Jr.	1	259
26	Aramís	1	246
26	Imposible	1	246
28	Black Terry	1	240
28	El Diablo Jr. I	1	240
30	Oficial AK-47	2	222
30	Oficial 911	2	222
32	Rey Leon	1	182
33	Black Warrior	1	175
33	Warrior Jr.	1	175
35	Alan Extreme	1	174
36	Danny Casas	1	171
37	MAZADA	2	161
38	Hell Boy	1	157
39	Atomico Jr.	1	154
39	Golden Dragon	1	154
41	NOZAWA	1	137
42	Apolo Estrada, Jr.	2	92
42	El Hijo del Diablo	2	92
44	Trauma II	1	88
45	Joey Marx	1	70
45	Mason Conrad	1	70
47	Susumu Mochizuki	1	63
47	Yasushi Kanda	1	63
49	Ricky Cruzz	1	58
49	Scorpio, Jr.	1	58
51	Eterno	2	52
52	Jack Morris	1	37+
52	Tirano	1	37+
54	Capo del Norte	1	37
54	Capo del Sur	1	37
56	Canis Lupus	1	31
57	American Gigolo	1	24
58	X-Fly	1	21
59	Látigo	1	14
59	Toxin	1	14
61	Bombero Infernal	1	N/A ¤

== Championship tournaments ==
=== 2010 Tag Team Tournament ===
On January 14, 2010, IWRG announced that they had stripped then reigning IWRG Tag Team Champions, Ricky Cruzz and Scorpio, Jr., of the championship due to inactivity. At the same time, they announced an eight-team tag team tournament to crown new tag team champions. The tournament was announced as a "Father / Son" Tag team tournament with all teams being composed of fathers and sons. The first block took place on January 17, 2010 and featured four teams: El Canek and Hijo del Canek, Pantera and Hijo del Pantera, Olímpico and Exodia, and Negro Navarro and Trauma I. Block B took place on January 24, 2010, and featured the following teams: Brazo de Plata and Brazo de Plata, Jr., Fuerza Guerrera and Juventud Guerrera, Pirata Morgan and Hijo de Pirata Morgan, Máscara Año 2000 and Máscara Año 2000, Jr. Negro Navarro and Trauma I won "Block A" while Pirata Morgan and Hijo de Pirata Morgan won "Block B", which meant that the two teams met to determine the next Tag Team champions. On January 31, 2010 Pirata Morgan and Hijo de Pirata Morgan won the championship.

=== 2015 Tag Team Tournament ===
In July 2015 IWRG announced that they were holding a tournament for the now vacant IWRG Intercontinental Tag Team Championship after IWRG stripped previous champions Chicano and Danny Casas of the championship.

Quarterfinals
1	Coloso Chris and Príncipe Orión	W
8	Los Oficiales (Oficial 911 and Oficial AK-47)
4	Los Junior Capos (El Hijo de Máscara Año 2000 and Universo 2000 Jr.)	W
5	Eterno and Hip Hop Man
2	Los Panteras (El Hijo del Pantera and Pantera II)	W
7	Golden Magic and Súper Nova
3	Danny Casas and Veneno	W
6	Canis Lupus and Negro Navarro

Semifinals
Coloso Chris and Príncipe Orión
Los Junior Capos	W
Los Panteras	W
Canis Lupus and Negro Navarro

Finals
Los Junior Capos
Los Panteras	W

=== 2020 #1 contender tournament ===
Quarterfinals		Semifinals	Finals
Los Golpeladors (Dragon Bane and El Hijo de Canis Lupus)	W
Los Japones (Shun Skywalker and Yoshioka)		Los Golpeladors
Los Negociantes (Demonio Infernal and Fresero Jr.)	W	Los Negociantes
Los Strippers Big (Big Chico Che and Big Ovett)			TBD
Los Traumas (Trauma I and Trauma II)	W		TBD
Los Capos (Capo del Norte and Capo del Sur)		Los Traumas
Los Exóticos (Jessy Ventura and Pasion Crystal)	W	Los Exóticos
Los Juniors (El Hijo del Espectro and Hijo de Kahoz)
