= UWF Super Welterweight Championship =

The UWF Super Welterweight Championship was a title in the Japanese professional wrestling, created by Universal Pro/FULL, then later on defended in Michinoku Pro and Osaka Pro before becoming inactive.

== Inaugural tournament ==
The inaugural tournament to crown the first champion was held on June 14 and June 15, 1992. It was a four-man tournament.

Semifinals
El Pantera
Rocky Santana
Super Delfin
Ciclón Ramirez

Final
El Pantera
Super Delfin

== Title history ==
Wrestlers:	Times:	Date:	Location:	Notes:
El Pantera	1	June 15, 1992	Sōka, Japan	Defeats Super Delfin in 4-man tournament finals.
Vacant when Pantera leaves tour.
Super Delfin	1	November 20, 1992	Osaka, Japan	Defeats Coloso for vacated title.
SATO	1	March 3, 1995	Osaka, Japan	
Vacates the title on May 12 because of an injury.
Super Delfin	2	May 14, 1995	Kooriyama, Japan	Defeats Triton for vacated title.
El Pantera	2	October 21, 1995	Iwate, Japan	
Karloff Lagarde, Jr.	1	February 7, 1996	Mexico	
El Pantera	3	March 5, 1996	Mexico	
Super Delfin	3	August 5, 1996	Aomori, Japan	
Men's Teioh	1	May 5, 1997	Nakayama, Japan	
Super Delfin	4	January 16, 1998	Sapporo, Japan	
Black Buffalo	1	November 21, 1999	Osaka, Japan	
Super Delfin	5	November 28, 1999	Osaka, Japan	
Abandons title after match in order to create Osaka Pro Wrestling Championship

== See also ==
- Osaka Pro Wrestling Championship
