= 2point5 Joshi Pro-Wrestling =

Japanese women's professional wrestling promotion

- Official logo of the promotion
- Founded: 2021
- Style: Joshi Puroresu
- Headquarters: Osaka, Japan
- Founder(s): Super Delfin
- Sister: Kaisen Puroresu
- Predecessor: Okinawa Pro Wrestling
- Website: https://2point5.jp/

2point5 Joshi Pro-Wrestling (2point5女子プロレス, 2point5 Joshi Puroresu) is a joshi puroresu (women's professional wrestling) promotion established in 2021.

== History ==
The promotion is run by Super Delfin and was established in August 2021. The promotion is based in Osaka, Japan. The "2point5" name refers to the being in the middle of 2D and 3D as the promotion plans to make use of special effects and "virtual wrestling". The promotion held wrestler auditions on September 26, 2021, with 9 applicants passing the audition. The promotions' slogans are, "Masked wrestlers, comedians and idol wrestlers will bring a new wind to the professional wrestling world" and "I want to deliver dreams to children!". The promotions features wrestlers from various occupations who see wrestling as a second career and aims to produce idols and entertainers who want to make their professional wrestling dreams come true.

The promotion had its pre-debut on February 11, 2022 and had its debut show on November 6, 2022. Various wrestlers from the promotion have also appeared for Pro Wrestling Zero1.

== Roster ==
Roster members include:

- Super Delfin
- Momoka Hanazono
- Flying Penguin
- Kagerou
- Nanami Nico
- Poppo the Hermit
- Chad
- Maho Kondo
- NOA
- Riemaru
- Super W

== See also ==
- Puroresu
