= Super Delfin =

Japanese professional wrestler (born 1967)

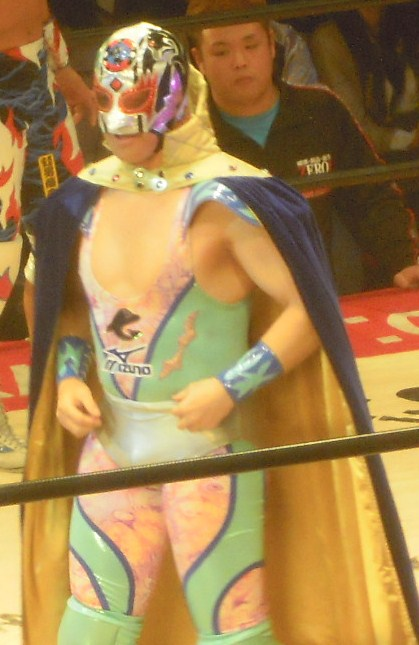
- Super Delfin in January 2012

Personal information
- Born: Hiroto Wakita; September 22, 1967 (age 58) Izumi, Osaka, Japan

Professional wrestling career
- Ring names: Super Delfin; Monkey Magic Wakita; Momotaro
- Billed height: 1.70 m (5 ft 7 in)
- Billed weight: 86 kg (190 lb)
- Trained by: Gran Hamada; Atsushi Onita; Apollo Sugawara
- Debut: March 19, 1989

Hiroto Wakita (脇田 洋人, Wakita Hiroto; born September 22, 1967) is a Japanese professional wrestler and politician who currently runs and wrestles for Kaisen Puroresu. He is better known by his stage name Super Delfin (スペル・デルフィン, Superu Derufin).

He has been a member of the Izumi City Council since 2012.

== Professional wrestling career ==
=== New Japan Pro-Wrestling (1989, 1994) ===
Hiroto Wakita joined New Japan Pro-Wrestling's dojo. He was affiliated with the Takeshi Puroresu Gundan, a Japanese take on the "Rock 'n Wrestling" concept espoused by the WWF at the time in the United States, using comedian and director Takeshi Kitano as the manager of Riki Choshu and others who had returned from All Japan Pro Wrestling. As fans were not receptive to the angle, Kitano and New Japan parted ways, which left Wakita and his fellow dojo students, the future Jado and Gedo, without a home. The three men began training almost on their own, with Wally Yamaguchi as their trainer. In 1994 he competed in the Best of the Super Juniors Tournament organised by New Japan Pro-Wrestling. He finished second by losing to Jyushin Thunder Liger in the finals. He attempted to play mind games on Liger by dressing in a similar outfit for the match.

=== Independent circuit and Mexico (1989–1994) ===
Eventually, Wakita and the others debuted as professional wrestlers in Amsterdam in March 1989. At first he wrestled without a mask under the name Monkey Magic Wakita. He began his career in Japan in Frontier Martial Arts Wrestling, and then continued on to Universal Lucha Libre, where he adopted the Super Delfin character after a tour to Mexico. On June 15, 1992 in Sōka, Japan Delfin lost to El Pantera in the 4-man tournament finals to determine the first ever UWF Super Welterweight Champion. Later Pantera vacated the championship by leaving the tour. Super Delfin defeated Coloso for vacated title on November 20, 1992 in Osaka, Japan. He held the title nearly two and a half years before losing it to SATO on March 3, 1995 in Osaka, Japan while wrestling for Michinoku Pro Wrestling.

=== Michinoku Pro Wrestling (1993–1996) ===
In 1993, he left Universal for Michinoku Pro Wrestling during his reign as UWF Super Welterweight Champion. After SATO vacated the title due to injury on May 12, 1995, Super Delfin defeated Triton for the vacated championship on May 14, 1995 in Kooriyama, Japan. He lost the title to El Pantera on October 21 the same year in Iwate, Japan. Super claimed his third UWF Super Welterweight Championship by victory over El Pantera in Aomori, Japan on August 5, 1996. He lost the title the following year to Men's Teioh on May 5 in Nakayama, Japan.

=== Consejo Mundial de Lucha Libre (1996–1999) ===
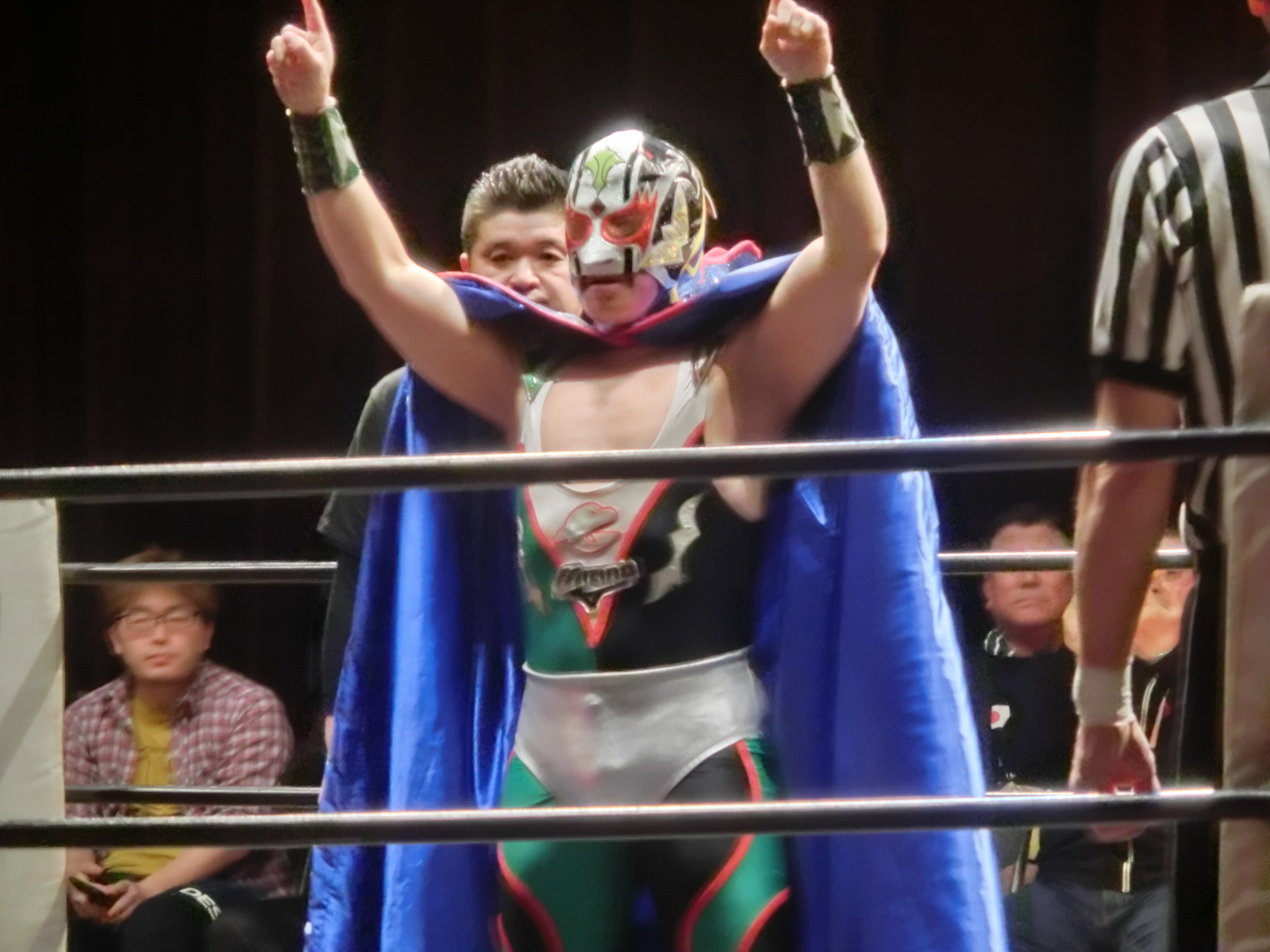
Super Delfin in 2019.

On March 15, 1996 he defeated El Pantera in a match supposedly for the CMLL World Welterweight Championship in Osaka, Japan. However Consejo Mundial de Lucha Libre did not acknowledge the change and declared the championship vacant because El Pantera had jumped to CMLL's competitor AAA before leaving for Japan.

On February 27, 1999 he defeated Olímpico in Nagoya, Japan for the CMLL World Welterweight Championship, this time for legitimate recognition. He lost the championship to Arkangel de la Muerte in Kawasaki, Japan on August 10, 1999.

=== Osaka Pro Wrestling (1998–2008) ===
He formed Osaka Pro Wrestling, a regional independent promotion in 1998, and the company had its first event April 29, 1999. He won the UWF Super Welterweight Championship altogether five times, in Universal, Michinoku Pro and Osaka Pro. In 1999 he abandoned that championship and replaced it with the Osaka Pro Wrestling Championship as the most prestigious Osaka Pro championship.

=== Toryumon (2007) ===
He also held the NWA World Welterweight Championship governed by Toryumon Mexico at the time for 11 days from January 20, 2007 to February 10, 2007. He won and lost the championship title from Hajime Ohara in Osaka, Japan.

=== Return to the independent circuit (2007–present) ===
Hirooki Goto vacated the NWA International Junior Heavyweight Championship on September 7, 2007, when he graduated to the heavyweight division. On November 9, 2008 in Osaka, Japan Super Delfin defeated Último Dragón in a decision match to revive title. In July 2015, Delfin announced he was forming a new promotion named Kaisen Puroresu. He formed 2point5 Joshi Pro Wrestling in 2021.

== Championships and accomplishments ==
- Consejo Mundial de Lucha Libre
  - CMLL World Welterweight Championship (1 time)
  - NWA World Welterweight Championship (1 time)
- Federación Universal de Lucha Libre
  - UWF Super Welterweight Championship (2 times)
- Michinoku Pro Wrestling
  - Tohoku Junior Heavyweight Championship (1 time)
  - UWF Super Welterweight Championship (2 times)
- Osaka Pro Wrestling
  - Osaka Pro Wrestling Championship (4 times)
  - Osaka Pro Wrestling Tag Team Championship (1 time) – with Gamma
  - UWF Super Welterweight Championship (1 time)
  - Tennōzan (2001)
- Pro Wrestling Illustrated
  - PWI ranked him #68 of the 500 top singles wrestlers in the PWI 500 in 1998
- Toryumon
  - NWA International Junior Heavyweight Championship (1 time)
- Universal Wrestling Association
  - UWA World Welterweight Championship (2 times)
