= Los Capos =

Mexican professional wrestling team

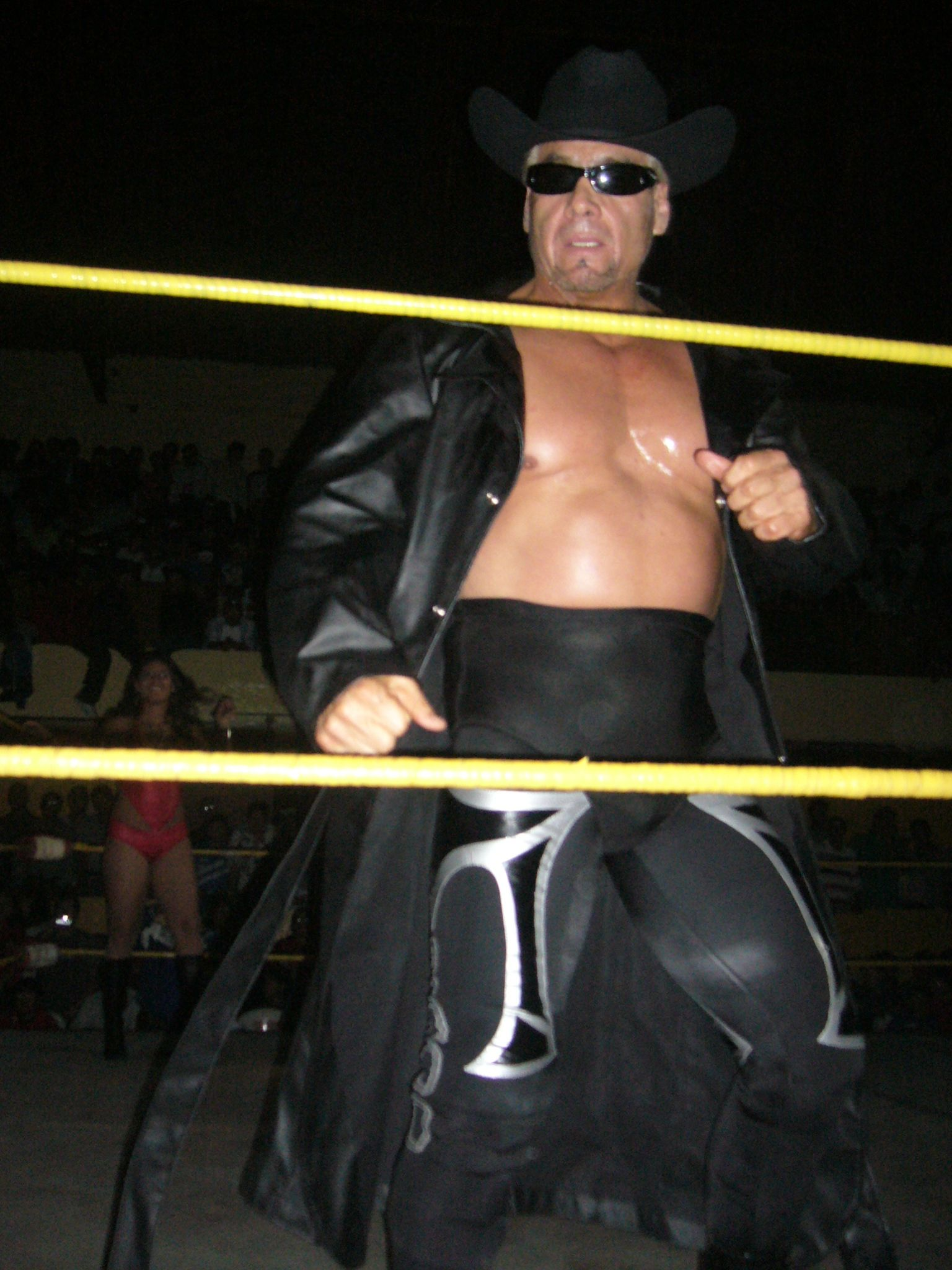
- Universo 2000, member of Los Capos

Stable
- Members: Cien Caras; Máscara Año 2000; Universo 2000
- Name(s): Los Capos; Los Hermanos Dinamita
- Billed heights: Cien Caras 1.91 m (6 ft 3 in); Máscara Año 2000 1.79 m (5 ft 10 in); Universo 2000 1.82 m (6 ft 0 in)
- Combined billed weight: Cien Caras 102 kg (225 lb); Máscara Año 2000 97 kg (214 lb); Universo 2000 102 kg (225 lb)
- Former members: Apolo Dantés
- Debut: 1980s

Los Capos (Spanish for "The Bosses") was a professional wrestling stable consisting of Cien Caras, Máscara Año 2000 (often written as "Dos Mil") and Universo 2000, and at one point also included Apolo Dantés. Los Capos is also often referred to as Los Hermanos Dinamita (Spanish for "The Dynamite Brothers") when working without Apolo Dantés as Cien Caras, Máscara Año 2000 and Universo 2000 are brothers. They have worked primarily in Consejo Mundial de Lucha Libre (CMLL) but also worked in AAA and currently do guest spots for the International Wrestling Revolution Group (IWRG).

== History ==
Los Hermanos Dinamita was formed in the late 1980s after Universo 2000 made his professional wrestling debut and began working with his older brothers Cien Caras and Máscara Año 2000. It was not until the early 1990s that the group began to work together on a regular basis when all three brothers worked for Consejo Mundial de Lucha Libre (CMLL) that the trio began to get noticed. While they worked as a team their biggest success came in individual competition, especially the oldest brother Cien Caras who won the CMLL World Heavyweight Championship. When former CMLL booker Antonio Peña left the promotion to form Asistencia Asesoría y Administración, later known simply as "AAA", jumped ship with him to continue with Konnan and became an integral part of the AAA's heavyweight division in its formative years. Cien Caras was a key factor in the events that led to the largest crown in Mexican wrestling history, 48,000 people, at Triplemanía I. While still working for CMLL Los Hermanas Dinamitas had won the Mexican National Trios Championship from Octagón, Atlantis and Máscara Sagrada and when they left CMLL they took the championship with them to AAA. The team held on to the Trios Title until they were defeated on April 26, 1994 almost three years after winning it. By the mid-1990s the group broke up as the brothers left AAA one by one to work on the Mexican Independent wrestling circuit or returned to CMLL.

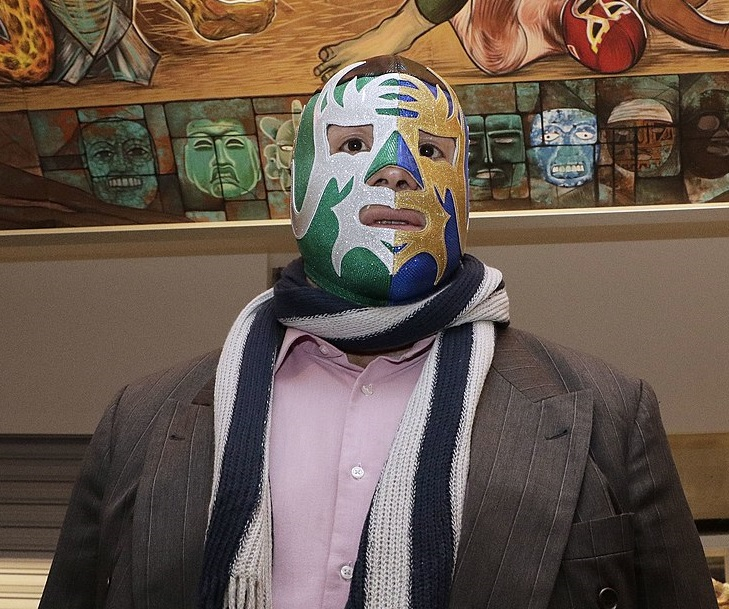
Máscara Año 2000 wearing his mask in November 2018

Universo 2000 was the first to return to CMLL and saw a lot of success as an individual wrestler, capturing the CMLL World Heavyweight Championship on three occasions. after the turn of the millennia Universo 2000 was joined by his older brothers as well as CMLL veteran Apolo Dantés, collectively known as "Los Capos", although the brothers were still referred to as "Los Hermanos Dinamita" when they appeared without Dantés. The group was a fixture in the heavyweight division, often helping Universo 2000 retain his title through unfair means. Los Capos worked mainly trios matches, most often as Rudos (the Spanish term for a "wrestling villain"), although at time they were cheered when working against other Rudos such as Pierroth Jr. or "Los Talibanes" (Emilio Charles Jr., Scorpio Jr. and Bestia Salvaje). By 2004 Los Capos were winding down their in-ring activities with the retirement of Cien Caras in the works. The retirement storyline involved Los Capos feuding with Perro Aguayo Jr. and his father, wrestler legend Perro Aguayo. This started out with Aguayo Jr. and El Terrible defeating Cien Caras and Máscara Año 2000 in a Luchas de Apuestas, hair vs. hair match where Caras and Máscara Año 2000 had put their hair on the line. After being shaved bald Los Capos attacked Perro Aguayo Jr. only to see Perro, Sr. run in to make the save. By the end of 2004 it was announced that Cien Caras would wrestle his last match on December 27, 2004 in a Luchas de Apuesta match teaming with Máscara Año 2000 against Pierroth Jr. and Vampiro Canadiense. Los Capos won the match and Cien Caras had a retirement ceremony after the match. The retirement was short lived as Caras ran in during a show and attacked Perro Aguayo Jr. stating that he had unfinished business with the young Aguayo and his father. The storyline culminated in a match at the annual Homenaje a Dos Leyendas show where Perro Sr. came out of retirement to team with his son, defeating Cien Caras and Máscara Año 2000 in a hair vs. hair match that saw Los Capos shaved bald once again. After the storyline with the Aguayos ended Los Capos slowly faded from CMLL. Apolo Dantés began working as a booker and trainer while Los Hermanos Dinamita worked a reduced scheduled before leaving CMLL completely.

== Los Capos Junior ==
In 2006 a group called Los Capos Junior or Los Dinamitas Junior began working for International Wrestling Revolution Group (IWRG), supposedly the sons of Los Hermanos Dinamita. While Cien Caras, Máscara Año 2000 and Universo 2000 all made IWRG appearances, endorsing Los Junior Capos it was later confirmed that most of the Juniors are not actually related to Los Hermanos Dinamita. El Hijo de Cien Caras (Spanish for "the son of Cien Caras") previously worked as "Suplex" and was actually the brother of L.A. Park. Cien Caras, Jr. previously worked as "Sheriff", he is also not a blood relation of Cien Caras. Máscara Año 2000, Jr. has been confirmed as being the son of Máscara Año 2000 and it is believed Hijo de Máscara Año 2000 is as well, although that remains unconfirmed.

== Nueva Generación Dinamita ==
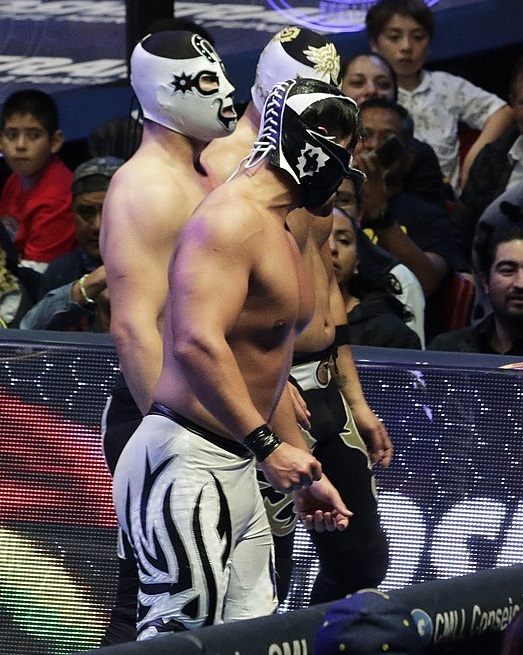
Sansón, El Cuatrero and Forastero outside the ring in November 2018

In late 2015, Sansón and El Cuatrero (sons of Cien Caras) teamed with Forastero (a nephew of the entire Los Capos group) to create "Nueva Generación Dinamita", the team later won the Occidente Trios Championship. all three participated in the La Copa Junior 2017. Cuatrero was placed in Block A and Sansón and Forastero were placed in Block B. Cuatrero defeated The Panther and Drone before losing to eventual winner Soberano Jr. Forastero defeated Stigma before being eliminated by Blue Panther Jr. and Sansón defeated Star Jr., Blue Panther Jr. and Esfinge qualifying for the finals where he was defeated by Soberano Jr.. all three participated in the Torneo Gran Alternativa where a young (novato) wrestler teams with an older, more experienced wrestler. for the tournament Sansón teamed up with Último Guerrero, Forastero with Mascara Año 2000 and Cuatrero and Shocker. Sansón and Último Guerrero defeated Pegasso and Blue Panther and Atlantis and Esfinge before losing to Soberano Jr. and Carístico in the finals. Shocker and Cuatrero defeated Stigma and Titán before losing to Esfinge and Atlantis. Forastero and Mascara Año 2000 lost to Atlantis and Esfinge, not making it through the first round. On July 22, 2017, Sansón and Cuatrero defeated Black Terry and Negro Navarro to win the CMLL Arena Coliseo Tag Team Championship. on July 25, the team defeated Mephisto, Luciferno and Ephesto to win the Mexican National Trios Championship. At the CMLL 84th Anniversary Show, they lost to Diamante Azul, Marco Corleone and Valiente. November 3, the team participated in a torneo cibernetico to crown the first CMLL Rey del Inframundo Champion also featuring Hechicero, Místico, Diamante Azul, Soberano Jr. and Valiente that saw Sansón pin Soberano to win the match and the championship.

== Championships and accomplishments ==
- Consejo Mundial de Lucha Libre
  - Mexican National Tag Team Championship (1 time) - Cien Caras and Máscara Año 2000
  - Mexican National Trios Championship (1 time) - Cien Caras, Máscara Año 2000 and Universo 2000
  - CMLL World Heavyweight Championship (4 times) - Cien Caras (1), Universo 2000 (3)
- Lucha Libre AAA Worldwide
  - AAA World Trios Championship (1 time) - El Cuatrero, Sansón and Forastero
  - AAA World Tag Team Championship (2 times, current) - Sansón and Forastero
- Wrestling Observer Newsletter
  - Wrestling Observer Newsletter Hall of Fame (2024) - Cien Caras, Máscara Año 2000 and Universo 2000

== Luchas de Apuestas record ==
Winner (wager)	Loser (wager)	Location	Event	Date	Notes
Perro Aguayo, Jr. and El Terrible (hair)	Cien Caras and Máscara Año 2000 (hair)	Mexico City	CMLL show	March 19, 2004	
Cien Caras and Máscara Año 2000 (hair)	Pierroth, Jr. and Vampiro Canadiense (hair)	Mexico City	Sin Piedad	December 17, 2004	
Perro Aguayo and Perro Aguayo Jr. (hair)	Cien Caras and Máscara Año 2000 (hair)	Mexico City	CMLL show	May 18, 2004	
