= Máscara Año 2000 Jr. =

Mexican wrestler (born 1977)

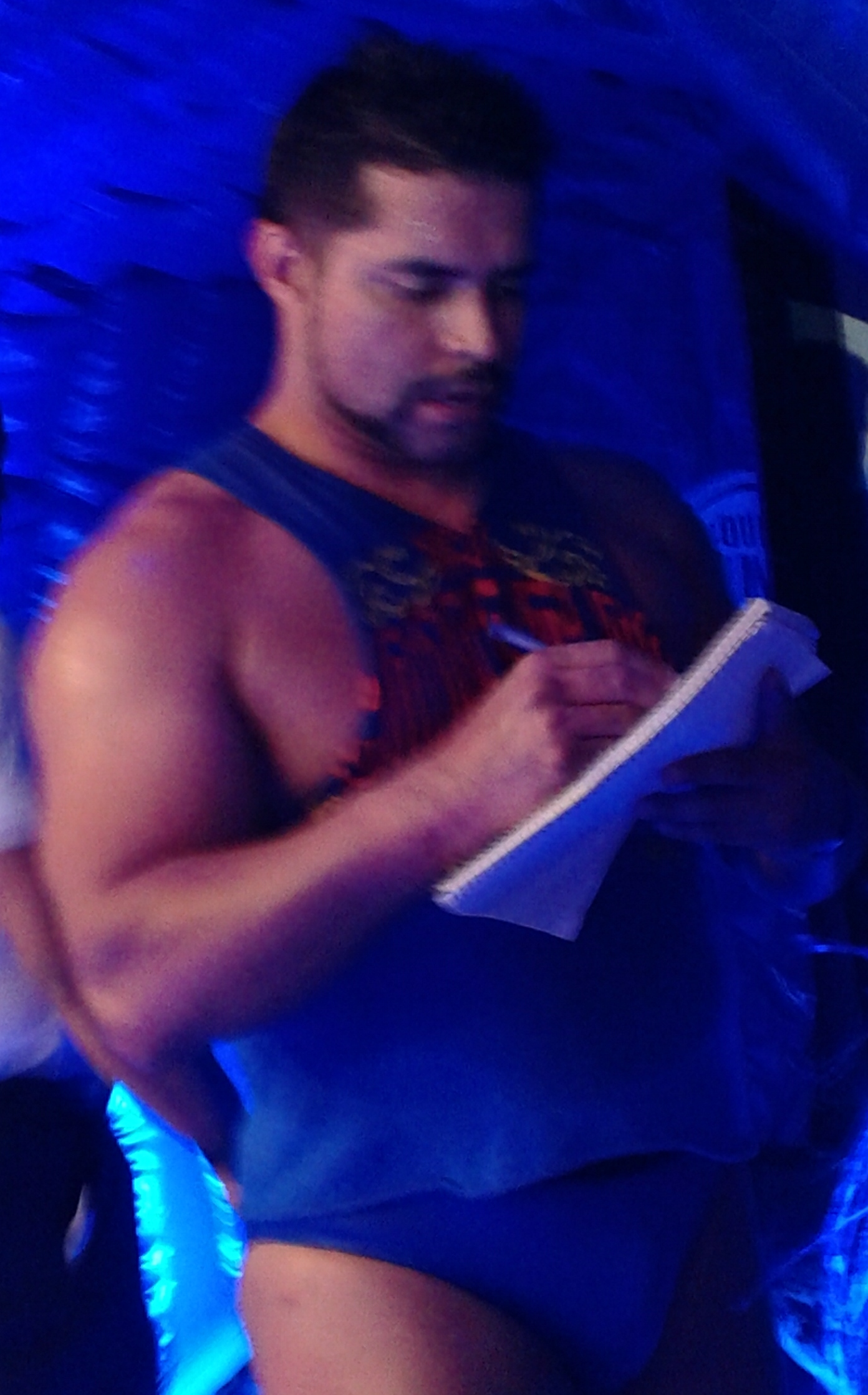
- Máscara Año 2000 Jr. in 2012

Personal information
- Born: Ángel Omar Reyes Franco; 16 January 1977 (age 49) Lagos de Moreno, Jalisco, Mexico

Professional wrestling career
- Ring name: Máscara Año 2000 Jr.
- Billed height: 1.82 m (5 ft 11 1/2 in)
- Billed weight: 102 kg (225 lb)
- Trained by: Máscara Año 2000
- Debut: 1999

Ángel Omar Reyes Franco (born 16 January 1977) is a Mexican professional wrestler, better known as Máscara Año 2000 Jr. He is working for Lucha Libre AAA World Wide (AAA), and International Wrestling Revolution Group (IWRG). Máscara Año 2000 Jr. originally worked under a mask and his real name was not a matter of public record, until he lost his mask in a match in August 2012. His father Jesús Reyes González wrestled under the ring name Máscara Año 2000.

Máscara Año 2000 Jr. is a former holder of the IWRG Intercontinental Heavyweight Championship and a co-holder of the IWRG Intercontinental Tag Team Championship along with El Hijo de Cien Caras. In the United States, he is best known through his appearance on the travel show Dhani Tackles the Globe, where he wrestled host Dhani Jones in an episode of the show's second season.

== Professional wrestling career ==
Reyes made his professional wrestling debut at some point in 1999, under an undisclosed ring name. From 1999 until 2006, he wrestled without revealing his family relations to his father Jesús Reyes González, better known as Máscara Año 2000. This is a practice not uncommon in Lucha libre where sons often "learn the trade" before being given the "family name".

In September 2006 he was finally introduced to the professional wrestling world as Máscara Año 2000 Jr. with his father publicly supporting him as he began to make a name for himself in the wrestling ring. A year later his brother was introduced to the wrestling world as El Hijo de Máscara Año 2000. Máscara Año 2000 Jr. has primarily worked for International Wrestling Revolution Group (IWRG), a Mexican promotion based out of Naucalpan, State of Mexico, for most of his career as Máscara Año 2000 Jr. although he did wrestle a few matches for Consejo Mundial de Lucha Libre (CMLL) in 2007. It was not long before Máscara Año 2000 Jr. began teaming with both Cien Caras Jr. and El Hijo de Cien Caras, two wrestlers who in storyline are the sons of Máscara Año 2000 Jr.'s uncle Cien Caras, but are actually unrelated and paid for the rights to use the names. The three formed a group called Los Hermanos Dinamita Jr. ("The Dynamite Brothers Junior"), the next generation of Los Hermanos Dinamita (Cien Caras, Máscara Año 2000 Sr. and Universo 2000). Máscara Año 2000 Jr. and El Hijo de Cien Caras teamed up to defeat El Felino and Pantera to win the IWRG Intercontinental Tag Team Championship on 31 May 2007, Máscara Año 2000 Jr.'s first wrestling championship. The team quickly established themselves as the most dominant IWRG Tag Team Champions as they held the title for 801 days and made 11 successful title defenses, although they did have a long period of inactivity as a team in early to mid-2009 due to Hijo de Cien Caras not working many dates for IWRG.

On 2 November 2008, Máscara Año 2000 Jr. was one of 10 wrestlers who put their mask on the line under Lucha de Apuesta, or bet match, rules in IWRG's annual Castillo del Terror ("Castle of Terror") match, a Steel Cage match where the last man in the cage is forced to unmask. The match came down to Máscara Año 2000 Jr. and Arlequin as the final two wrestlers, with Máscara Año 2000 Jr. pinning his opponent to keep his mask safe. He also participated in the 2009 Castillo del Terror but escaped the cage midway through the match. On 14 March 2009, Máscara Año 2000 Jr. defeated Scorpio Jr. to win the IWRG Rey del Ring ("King of the Ring") title. He never lost the title in the ring as the IWRG awards the Rey del Ring championship to the winner of the annual tournament, which he can then defend as a proper championship for the following year. Los Hermanos Dinamita Jr. lost the tag team title to Ricky Cruz and Scorpio Jr. on 9 August 2009. After not defending the Mexican National Heavyweight Championship since September 2007 Charly Manson's first title defense came against Máscara Año 2000 Jr. on 5 December 2009, making the Mexican National Heavyweight title active again after three years.

In March 2010, Máscara Año 2000 Jr. became involved in a storyline with Dhani Jones, a Cincinnati Bengals Linebacker who hosts a show called Dhani Tackles the Globe on the Travel Channel. During an IWRG show in Arena Naucalpan in March 2010, Jones and his camera crew taped a segment where he challenged Máscara Año 2000 Jr. to a match, a challenge that was quickly accepted. The two wrestled in the main event of an IWRG show on 14 March 2010. Jones entered the ring wearing a traditional lucha mask but the Mexico State wrestling and boxing commission would not allow him to actually wrestle in it as it had not been approved by the commission. The match between the two went over 20 minutes and was described as "good for a rookie" by SuperLuchas magazine crediting both Jones' athleticism and Máscara Año 2000 Jr.'s skills. Initially it looked like Jones won the match as he pinned Máscara Año 2000 Jr. after a low blow while the referee was not looking. Following the pinfall the decision was reversed and Máscara Año 2000 Jr. won by disqualification, although it's not clear if the disqualification part of the match will be shown on the Travel Channel show. The episode of Dhani Jones Tackles the Globe featuring Máscara Año 2000 Jr. premiered on 14 June 2010.

In April 2010, the Mexico State wrestling commission stripped the team of Black Terry, Dr. Cerebro and Cerebro Negro of the Estado de Mexico (State of Mexico) Trios Championship as Cerebro Negro had not wrestled in the State of Mexico for 90 days. Máscara Año 2000 Jr. teamed up with Máscara Año 2000 and El Hijo de Máscara Año 2000 for the tournament, qualifying for the finals by defeating first Chico Che Jr., Ultraman Jr., and Zatura, and then Brazo de Plata, Brazo Metálico, and El Hijo del Brazo de Plata to qualify for the finals of the tournament. Three days later, on 18 April 2010, Máscara Año 2000 Jr. teamed up with El Canek to face Scorpio Jr. and Pirata Morgan in a Relevos Suicidas where the losing team would wrestle each other, risking either their hair, mask or the IWRG Intercontinental Heavyweight Championship which El Canek held. Máscara Año 2000 Jr. and El Canek lost and faced off in a match for Máscara's mask and El Canek's title. Máscara Año 2000 Jr. managed to defend his mask, pinning El Canek to become the new heavyweight champion, making the title active for the first time since 2006.

=== AAA vs. IWRG feud ===
During an IWRG show on 29 April 2010, Lucha Libre AAA World Wide (AAA) wrestler Silver King showed up for the show, allegedly to promote the movie Nacho Libre II but ended up starting an interpromotional feud between AAA and IWRG. Los Junior Dinamitas quickly came to the defense of IWRG, wrestling against Silver King and other AAA representatives such as Alex Koslov, Chessman and Cibernético. During AAA's Triplemanía XVIII, Los Junior Dinamitas made a surprise appearance moments after Silver King and Último Gladiador won the AAA World Tag Team Championship to challenge the new champions. This marked the first time IWRG wrestlers appeared on AAA television. On 20 June 2010, Máscara Año 2000 Jr. and El Hijo de Cien Caras defeated Los Piratos (Pirata Morgan and El Hijo de Pirata Morgan to win the IWRG Tag Team Championship for a second time. On 26 June 2010, Silver King defeated Máscara Año 2000 Jr. to win the IWRG Intercontinental Heavyweight Championship in an AAA/IWRG interpromotional match. On 14 November 2010, Los Junior Dinamitas lost the IWRG Intercontinental Tag Team Championship back to Los Piratos. On 29 November 2010, Máscara Año 2000 Jr.'s tag team partner of many years, El Hijo de Cien Caras, was assassinated in Coyoacán, Mexico City. On 19 December 2010, Máscara Año 2000 Jr. defeated El Hijo de Pirata Morgan to win the UWF United States Heavyweight Championship. On 1 December, Máscara Año 2000 Jr., El Hijo de Máscara Año 2000, and Cien Caras Jr. defeated Los Perros del Mal (Bestia 666, Damián 666 and X-Fly) to win the IWRG Intercontinental Trios Championship.

=== El Consejo ===
On 16 December 2011, at AAA's Guerra de Titanes pay-per-view, Máscara Año 2000 Jr. formed the stable El Consejo ("The Council") with former CMLL workers El Texano Jr. and Toscano. On 21 January 2012, Mortiz and Semental joined El Consejo, which quickly established itself as a force opposing both tecnicos and rudos of AAA. On 10 February, El Consejo was joined by Argos. El Consejo's first big match in AAA took place on 18 March at Rey de Reyes, where Máscara Año 2000 Jr., El Texano Jr. and Toscano defeated AAA representatives Dr. Wagner Jr., Electroshock and Heavy Metal, following interference from the stable's newest member, El Hombre de Negro. On 19 May, Máscara Año 2000 Jr., El Texano Jr. and Toscano defeated Los Psycho Circus (Monster Clown, Murder Clown and Psycho Clown), following another interference from El Hombre de Negro, to win the AAA World Trios Championship. On 16 June, El Hombre de Negro unmasked and revealed himself as Máscara Año 2000. On 5 August, in the main event of Triplemanía XX, Máscara Año 2000 Jr. was defeated by Dr. Wagner Jr. in a Mask vs. Mask match. Following the loss, Reyes was forced to unmask and reveal his real name. Máscara Año 2000 Jr., along with Cien Caras Jr., Pirata Morgan, and Rayo de Jalisco Jr., competed in a four-way steel cage match billed by IWRG as Prison Fatal ("Deadly Prison"). During the match, Hijo de Máscara Año 2000 interfered, which caused Pirata Morgan Jr. to enter the match as well to escalate the rivalry between Los Piratas and Los Capos Junior. The match ended with Pirata Morgan being the last man in the cage and thus having his hair shaved off. On 24 April 2016, Máscara Año 2000 Jr. defeated Trauma II to win the IWRG Intercontnental Heavyweight Championship for the third time. On 12 June 2016, Máscara Año 2000 Jr. lost the heavyweight championship to Mr. Electro when he was disqualified, in IWRG championships can change hands on a disqualification.

== Personal life ==
Reyes is the son of luchador Jesús Reyes González, whom his ring name is taken from. He's also got a brother who wrestles as "El Hijo de Máscara Año 2000" and he's the nephew of Carmelo Reyes González (Cien Caras) and Andrés Reyes González (Universo 2000). During the buildup to the match with Dhani Jones, Máscara Año 2000 Jr. revealed that he used to play Fullback for the White Eagles football team, although no school name or city was mentioned, before he became a Luchador.

== Championships and accomplishments ==
- Lucha Libre AAA World Wide
  - AAA World Trios Championship (1 time) – with El Texano Jr. and Toscano
- International Wrestling Revolution Group
  - IWRG Intercontinental Heavyweight Championship (4 times)
  - IWRG Intercontinental Tag Team Championship (2 times) – with El Hijo de Cien Caras
  - IWRG Intercontinental Trios Championship (1 time) – with Cien Caras Jr. and El Hijo de Máscara Año 2000
  - IWRG Rey del Ring (1 time)
  - UWF United States Heavyweight Championship (1 time)

== Luchas de Apuestas record ==
Winner (wager)	Loser (wager)	Location	Event	Date	Notes
Máscara Año 2000 Jr. (mask)	Arlequin	Naucalpan, Mexico State	El Castillo del Terror	2 November 2008	(Note: Steel Cage match that also included El Hijo de Cien Caras, Fantasma de la Ópera, Multifacético, El Hijo de Aníbal, Ultraman Jr., Yack, Pendulo, El Hijo del Pierroth.)
Máscara Año 2000 Jr. (mask)	El Canek (Championship)	Naucalpan, Mexico State	IWRG Live event	18 April 2010	(Note: Máscara Año 2000 Jr.'s mask and El Canek's IWRG Intercontinental Heavyweight Championship was on the line after the team lost a Relevos Suicidas match to Pirata Morgan and Scorpio Jr.)
Dr. Wagner Jr. (mask)	Máscara Año 2000 Jr. (mask)	Mexico City	Triplemanía XX	5 August 2012	
Máscara Año 2000 Jr. (hair)	Pirata Morgan (hair)	Naucalpan, Mexico State	Prison Fatal	17 March 2013	(Note: Multi-man Steel Cage match that also included Cien Caras Jr. and Rayo de Jalisco Jr.)
Máscara Año 2000 Jr. (hair)	Mr. Elektro (hair)	Naucalpan, Mexico State	Cabellera vs. Cabellera	17 July 2016	
Pirata Morgan (hair)	Máscara Año 2000 Jr. (hair)	Naucalpan, Mexico State	Arena Naucalpan 39th Anniversary Show	21 December 2016	
Máscara Año 2000 Jr. (hair)	Toscano (hair)	Naucalpan, State of Mexico	IWRG 23rd Anniversary Show	1 January 2019	(Note: This was a steel cage match)
