= Hijo de Máscara Año 2000 =

Mexican wrestler (born 1986)

Personal information
- Born: Unrevealed; 1986 (age 39–40) Lagos de Moreno, Jalisco, Mexico
- Parent: Máscara Año 2000 (father)
- Relatives: Cien Caras (uncle); Universo 2000 (uncle); El Cuatrero (cousin); Sansón (cousin); Forastero (cousin); Universo 2000 Jr. (cousin)

Professional wrestling career
- Ring name: Hijo de Máscara Año 2000
- Billed height: 1.80 m (5 ft 11 in)
- Trained by: Máscara Año 2000
- Debut: May 5, 2007

Hijo de Máscara Año 2000 (born 1986) is a Mexican professional wrestler, currently working for the Mexican promotion Consejo Mundial de Lucha Libre (CMLL) portraying a rudo ("Bad guy") wrestling character. Hijo de Máscara Año 2000's real name is not a matter of public record, as is often the case with masked wrestlers in Mexico where their private lives are kept a secret from the wrestling fans.

He is a second-generation wrestler, son of Máscara Año 2000, nephew of Cien Caras and Universo 2000. In 2019 he joined forces with his cousins El Cuatrero, Sansón, Forastero and Universo 2000 Jr. as part of Sangre Dinamita. From 2007 through 2017 Hijo de Máscara Año 2000 was a mainstay in International Wrestling Revolution Group (IWRG) where he won the IWRG Intercontinental Trios Championship with Cien Caras Jr. and Máscara Año 2000 Jr., the IWRG Junior de Juniors Championship and the IWRG Rey del Ring Championship. He is not related to either Cien Caras Jr., Máscara Año 2000 Jr. nor El Hijo de Cien Caras.

== Professional wrestling career ==
In Mexico, it is traditional to keep the true identity of a masked wrestler a secret, not revealing their real names and oftentimes not revealing what previous ring names they have competed under. While Hijo de Máscara Año 2000 is listed as having made his professional wrestling debut in 2007 it has not been confirmed if he previously worked under a masked or unmasked ring identity and then took on the name "Hijo de Máscara Año 2000". It is not verified if he really is the son of Máscara Año 2000, even though his name literally means "Son of Máscara Año 2000". Out of all the wrestlers billed as being sons of Máscara Año 2000 or his brother Cien Caras, only one, Máscara Año 2000 Jr., has been confirmed as being a biological relative, while two others Hijo de Cien Caras and Cien Caras, Jr. were confirmed as not being related to the family. One of his early appearances as "Hijo de Máscara Año 2000" was on July 26, 2007 when he participated in the inaugural Rey del Ring ("King of the Ring") tournament, eliminated as the 26th overall competitor as Yamato won the 30-man tournament. In the subsequent months he began teaming with Máscara Año 2000, Jr. (his brother) and Hijo de Cien Caras (Not related) to form Los Capos Junior, also referred to as Los Dinamitas Junior after the team Los Capos / Los Hermanos Dinamita ("The Bosses / The Dynamite Brothers") formed by their "fathers". In April 2010, the Mexico State wrestling commission stripped the team of Black Terry, Dr. Cerebro and Cerebro Negro of the Distrito Federal Trios Championship as Cerebro Negro had not wrestled in the State of Mexico for 90 days. Hijo de Máscara Año 2000 and Máscara Año 2000, Jr. teamed up with their father for the tournament, qualifying for the finals by defeating first the team of Chico Che, Ultraman, Jr. and Zatura and then Brazo de Plata, Brazo Metálico and Hijo del Brazo de Plata to qualify for the finals of the tournament. The following week Los Máscaras Año 2000 lost to the team of Los Gringos VIP (Avisman, El Hijo del Diablo and Gringo Loco) in the finals of the tournament.

IWRG created a new championship in early 2011 called the IWRG Junior de Juniors Championship, designed specifically for second-generation wrestlers, either actual or fictional second-generation wrestlers. Hijo de Máscara Año 2000 was one of ten wrestlers who participated in the tournament to determine the first champion. In the first round Hijo de Máscara Año 2000 defeated Bobby Lee, Jr. and in the second round he defeated Ultraman, Jr. only to be defeated by Hijo de L.A. Park in the semi-final match and thus eliminated from the tournament. In September, 2011 IWRG held a trios tournament to determine the next challengers for the IWRG Intercontinental Trios Championship. In the preliminary round Los Capos Junior outlasted the teams of Los Perros del Mal (Bestia 666, Damian 666 and X-Fly) and Los Psycho Circus (Monster Clown, Murder Clown and Psycho Clown) to earn a match for the championship at a later date.

He was one of 10 wrestlers to put his mask on the line in the 2011 Castillo del Terror ("Tower of Terror") match, but escaped the steel cage halfway through the match, keeping his mask safe. On December 1, 2011 Los Capos Junior defeated Los Perros del Mal to win the IWRG Intercontinental Championship. The team would hold the titles for 177 days, until May 27, 2012 where they lost to La Familia de Tijuana (Damian 666, Headhunter A and X-Fly).| Los Capos Junior, in this case Hijo de Máscara Año 2000 and Cien Caras, Jr., participated in the 2012 Gran Legado ("Great Legacy") tournament, but lost to the father/son team of Pirata Morgan and Hijo de Pirata Morgan.| A few days later Hijo de Máscara Año 2000 put his mask on the line against Bestia 666, who put the IWRG Junior de Juniors Championship on the line, Hijo de Máscara Año 2000 won the match, kept his mask and became the IWRG Junior de Juniors Champion. Los Capos Junior, primarily Hijo de Máscara Año 2000 and Cien Caras, Jr. since Máscara Año 2000, Jr. had joined the La Consejo group in AAA, participated in the 2012 Guerra de Empresas ("Battle of the promotions") tournament, representing IWRG. The team qualified for the finals by defeating La Familia de Tijuana (Damian 666 and X-Fly) and El Consejo (Argos and El Texano, Jr.) but lost to Cibernético and La Parka (representing AAA) in the finals.

On September 16, 2012 Hijo de Pirata Morgan won the IWRG Junior de Juniors Championship from Hijo de Máscara Año 2000 in a match where Hijo de Pirata Morgan's Rey del Ring Championship was also on the line. On March 31, 2013 Hijo de Máscara Año 2000 and Cien Caras, Jr. competed in IWRG's La Guerra de Familias ("War of the Families") tournament. The team defeated Heavy Metal and Danny Casas in the first round and then Trauma II in the finals when Trauma I was unable to compete to win the tournament. A week later Los Junior Dinamitas wrestled Trauma I and Negro Navarro for the IWRG Intercontinental Tag Team Championship, but lost. On May 4, 2014, Hijo de Máscara Año 2000 won the 2014 Rey del Ring tournament and the Rey del Ring Championship. On October 5, 2014, The IWRG Intercontinental Heavyweight Champion El Hijo de Dos Caras defeated Hijo de Mascara Año 2000 on a Title Vs. Title match after both previously shared a tag team match against Relevos Increibles Suicidas lost Cien Caras Jr. and Demon Clown.. Año 2000 regained the title on January 11, 2015.

=== Consejo Mundial de Lucha Libre (2019–present) ===
Hijo de Máscara Año 2000 made his surprise debut at Consejo Mundial de Lucha Libre (CMLL)'s Juicio Final where he, along with his cousins El Cuatrero, Sansón, Forastero and Universo 2000 Jr. tried to help Máscara Año 2000 defeat Último Guerrero, but was unable to do so.

== Championships and accomplishments ==
- International Wrestling Revolution Group
  - IWRG Intercontinental Trios Championship (1 time) – with Cien Caras, Jr. and Máscara Año 2000, Jr.
  - IWRG Junior de Juniors Championship (1 time)
  - IWRG Rey del Ring Championship (2 times)
  - Rey del Ring (2014)
  - Guerra de Familias (2013) – with Cien Caras, Jr.
  - Guerra Revolucionaria
