= Cien Caras Jr. =

Mexican wrestler (born 1976)

Personal information
- Born: Unrevealed; October 18, 1976 (age 49) Guadalajara, Jalisco, Mexico

Professional wrestling career
- Ring name(s): Cien Caras Jr. Sheriff
- Billed height: 1.90 m (6 ft 3 in)
- Billed weight: 110 kg (243 lb)
- Trained by: Flash; AbueloCarrillo; Chucho Garcia; Loco Zandokan II; Centella
- Debut: 1997

Cien Caras Jr. (born October 18, 1976) is a Mexican professional wrestler, currently working for the Mexican promotion International Wrestling Revolution Group (IWRG) portraying a rudo ("Bad guy") wrestling character. Cien Caras Jr.'s real name is not a matter of public record, as is often the case with masked wrestlers in Mexico where their private lives are kept a secret from the wrestling fans. He is not a blood relative of wrestler Cien Caras, but instead is using the ring name with permission from Cien Caras.

== Professional wrestling career ==
In Mexico, where the style of professional wrestling called lucha libre became popular, it is traditional to keep the true identify of a masked wrestler a secret, not revealing their real names and oftentimes not revealing what previous ring names they have competed under. While Cien Caras Jr. is listed as having made his professional wrestling debut in 1997 under the name "Sheriff", it has not been confirmed if he previously worked under a masked or unmasked ring identity and then adopted the masked character "Sheriff" afterwards. While he later competed as "Cien Caras Jr." he started his wrestling career using the name Sheriff, working mainly in and around his native city of Guadalajara, Jalisco, Mexico. Arena Coliseo in Guadalajara is associated with Consejo Mundial de Lucha Libre's (CMLL) wrestling school, but also promotes weekly wrestling shows featuring trainees, CMLL contracted wrestlers and local workers who are not officially affiliated with CMLL. From 1997 until 2005 Sheriff worked primarily in Guadalajara, primarily in lower to mid position of the card.

=== Cien Caras Jr. (2005–present) ===
He became Cien Caras Jr. in 2005, adopting the masked character of a son of wrestler Carmelo Reyes González, better known as Cien Caras. He also began teaming with Hijo de Cien Caras, like Cien Caras Jr. he was not an actual son of Reyes, but paid to use the character. Together the team held the Occidente (Western States) Tag Team Championship from December 11, 2005 when they defeated the team of Flash I and Flash II until June 10, 2007 where they lost the titles to the team of El Sagrado and Rayman. After the loss of the Occidente Tag Team Championship the fictional sons of Cien Caras began working for International Wrestling Revolution Group (IWRG) where they began teaming with Máscara Año 2000 Jr., son of Máscara Año 2000 and nephew of Cien Caras. The three formed a group called Los Junior Dinamitas ("The Junior Dynamites"), or Los Junior Capos, the next generation of Los Hermanos Dinamita (Cien Caras, Máscara Año 2000 Sr. and Universo 2000). During an IWRG show on April 29, 2010 AAA wrestler Silver King showed up for the show, allegedly to promote the movie "Nacho Libre II" but ended up starting an interpromotional feud between AAA and IWRG. Los Junior Dinamitas quickly came to the defense of IWRG, wrestling against Silver King and other AAA representatives such as Alex Koslov, Chessman and Cibernético. During AAA's Triplemanía XVIII Los Junior Dinamitas made a surprise appearance moments after Silver King and Último Gladiador won the AAA World Tag Team Championship to challenge the new champions. This marked the first time IWRG wrestlers appeared on AAA television. On November 29, 2010, Cien Caras Jr.'s tag team partner of many years, El Hijo de Cien Caras, was assassinated in Coyoacán, Mexico City. Following Hijo de Cien Caras, Cien Caras Jr. began working regularly with Máscara Año 2000 Jr. and Hijo de Máscara Año 2000. In September, 2011 IWRG held a trios tournament to determine the next challengers for the IWRG Intercontinental Trios Championship. In the preliminary round Los Capos Junior outlasted the teams of Los Perros del Mal (Bestia 666, Damian 666 and X-Fly) and Los Psycho Circus (Monster Clown, Murder Clown and Psycho Clown) to earn a match for the championship at a later date. He was one of 10 wrestlers to put his mask on the line in the 2011 Castillo del Terror ("Tower of Terror") match, but escaped the steel cage halfway through the match, keeping his mask safe. On December 1, 2011 Los Capos Junior defeated Los Perros del Mal to win the IWRG Intercontinental Championship. The team would hold the titles for 177 days, until May 27, 2012 where they lost to La Familia de Tijuana (Damian 666, Headhunter A and X-Fly).| Los Capos Junior, in this case Hijo de Máscara Año 2000 and Cien Caras Jr., participated in the 2012 Gran Legado ("Great Legacy") tournament, but lost to the father/son team of Pirata Morgan and Hijo de Pirata Morgan.| He also worked a number of shows for Hijo del Santo's Todo X el Todo promotion, often teaming up with his storyline father Cien Caras, at times working against Cien Caras' rival Rayo de Jalisco Jr. and his son Rayman including a match for the vacant WWA Tag Team Championship.

On December 16, 2011, at AAA's Guerra de Titanes pay-per-view, Máscara Año 2000 Jr. formed the stable El Consejo ("The Council") with former CMLL workers El Texano Jr. and Toscano, while he did not officially split from the other Junior Capos he worked less and less with the other two members. The team would hold the titles for 177 days, until May 27, 2012 where they lost to La Familia de Tijuana (Damian 666, Headhunter A and X-Fly). On June 21, 2012 Cien Caras Jr. defeated Headhunter A to win the IWRG Intercontinental Heavyweight Championship. Los Capos Junior, participated in the 2012 Gran Legado ("Great Legacy") tournament, but lost to the father/son team of Pirata Morgan and Hijo de Pirata Morgan.| The duo also participated in the 2012 Guerra de Empresas ("Battle of the promotions") tournament, representing IWRG. The team qualified for the finals by defeating La Familia de Tijuana (Damian 666 and X-Fly) and El Consejo (Argos and El Texano Jr.) but lost to Cibernético and La Parka (representing Lucha Libre AAA World Wide (AAA)) in the finals.| Cien Caras Jr. participated in the main event of IWRG's 2012 Festival de las Máscaras, where he teamed up with Lucha Libre legends Negro Navarro and Fuerza Guerrera, only to lose to El Canek, Octagón and El Solar, replacing Cien Caras at the last minute. IWRG held a tournament to determine the number 1 contender for the IWRG Rey del Ring Championship, a tournament Cien Caras Jr. won by defeating Oficial AK-47 in the first round, Hijo de Pirata Morgan in the second round and Veneno in the finals. A week later he unsuccessfully challenged Oficial Factor for the title. Cien Caras Jr. along with Máscara Año 2000 Jr., Pirata Morgan and Rayo de Jalisco Jr. competed in a four-way, steel cage match billed by IWRG as Prison Fatal ("Deadly Prison"). During the match Hijo de Máscara Año 2000 interfered, which caused Pirata Morgan Jr. to enter the match as well to escalate the rivalry between Los Piratas and Los Capos Junior. The match ended with Pirata Morgan being the last man in the cage and thus had his hair shaved off. On March 31, 2013 Cien Caras Jr. and Hijo de Máscara Año 2000 competed in IWRG's La Guerra de Familias ("War of the Families") tournament. The team defeated Heavy Metal and Danny Casas in the first round and then Trauma II in the finals when Trauma I was unable to compete to win the tournament. A week later Los Junior Dinamitas wrestled Trauma I and Negro Navarro for the IWRG Intercontinental Tag Team Championship, but lost. On January 26, 2014, Caras Jr. lost the IWRG Intercontinental Heavyweight Championship to Vampiro Canadiense, ending his nineteen-month reign.

== Championships and accomplishments ==
- CMLL Guadalajara (Note: CMLL runs a wrestling school in Guadalajara, attending the school does not automatically put them under contract with CMLL)
  - Occidente Heavyweight Championship (1 time)
  - Occidente Tag Team Championship (1 time) – with El Hijo de Cien Caras
  - Occidente Trios Championship (1 time) – with Asesino Negro and Asesino Negro Jr.
- International Wrestling Revolution Group
  - IWRG Intercontinental Heavyweight Championship (1 time)
  - IWRG Intercontinental Trios Championship (1 time) – with Hijo de Máscara Año 2000 and Máscara Año 2000 Jr.
  - La Guerra de Familias tournament (2013) – with Hijo de Máscara Año 2000
- World Wrestling Association
  - WWA World Junior Heavyweight Championship (1 time, current)

== Luchas de Apuestas record ==
Winner (wager)	Loser (wager)	Location	Event	Date	Notes
Sheriff (mask)	Pirata (hair)	Guadalajara, Jalisco	Live event	2002	
Sheriff (mask)	Asesino Negro (hair)	Guadalajara, Jalisco	Live event	September 14, 2004	
Cien Caras Jr. (mask)	Mario Mora (hair)	Mazatlan, Sinaloa	Live event	July 29, 2006	
