= Pantera (wrestler) =

Mexican professional wrestler

El Pantera
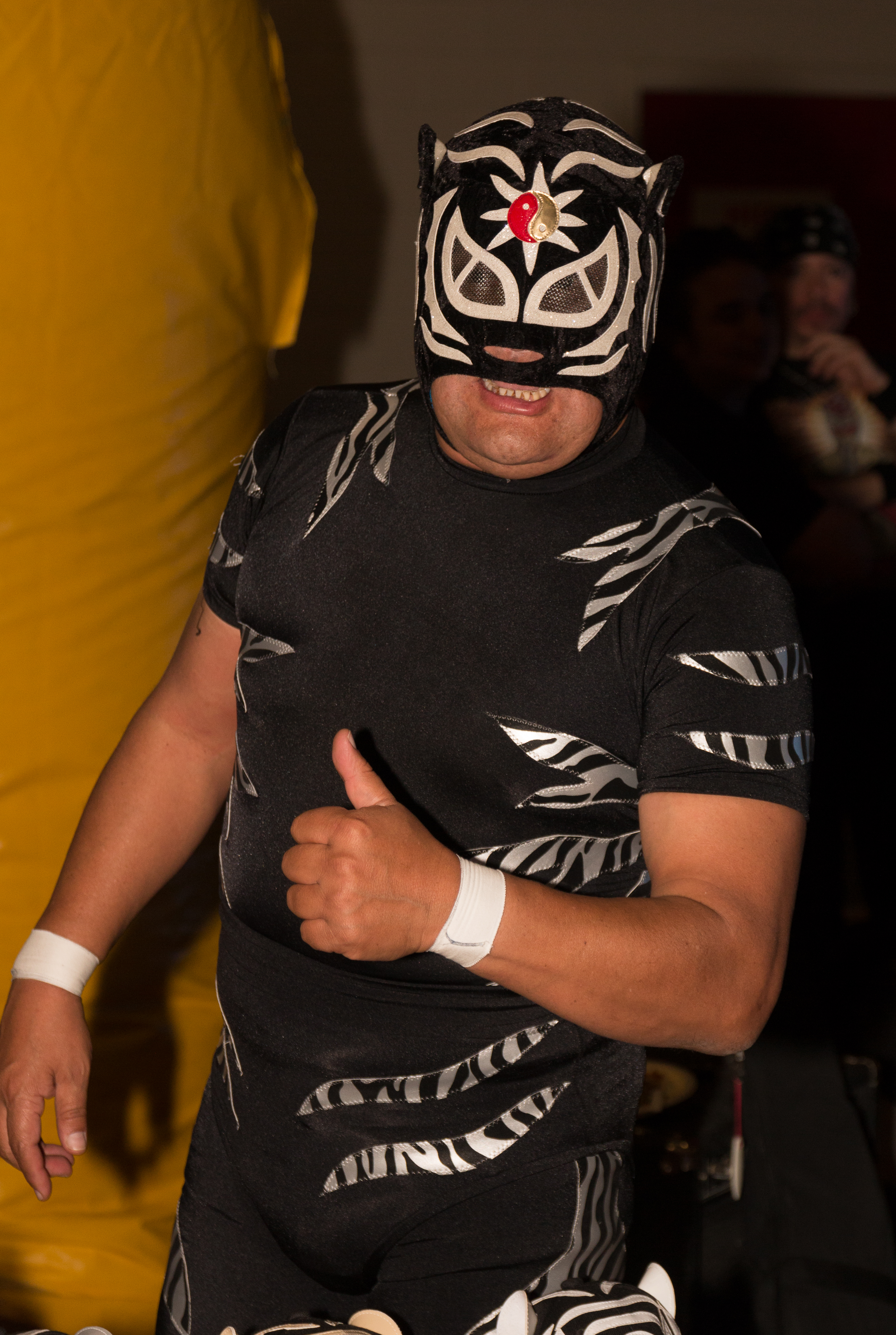
- El Pantera in January 2016

Personal information
- Born: Francisco Javier Pozas; February 3, 1964 (age 62) Querétaro, Querétaro, Mexico

Professional wrestling career
- Ring names: América; El Manaya; El Pantera; El Pantera II; Internacional Pantera; Pantera; Tanaka; Tritón
- Billed height: 1.71 m (5 ft 7 1/2 in)
- Billed weight: 85 kg (187 lb)
- Billed from: Querétaro, Querétaro, Mexico
- Trained by: Carnicerito; Pirata Moreno; Rafael Salamanca; Raul Reyes
- Debut: 11 November 1985

Francisco Javier Pozas (born February 3, 1964) is a Mexican professional wrestler, who is best known under the ring name El Pantera, but has also worked as Pantera II, El Manaya, América, Tritón and Tanaka over the years. Pozas made his wrestling debut in 1985, working as an masked with a panther-inspired mask to go with his ring character of "El Pantera". Over the years Pozas has worked in Mexico, Japan and the United States; In Mexico he has worked for Consejo Mundial de Lucha Libre (CMLL), Asistencia Asesoría y Administración (AAA), International Wrestling Revolution Group (IWRG), in Japan he's worked for Universal Lucha Libre (ULL) and All-Japan Pro Wrestling (AJPW) and in the United States he's most known for his work in the World Wrestling Federation (WWF) from 1997 to 1999 and Chikara where he has worked shows since 2007. In 2006 Pantera lost his mask as a result of a match. He, however, continued wearing the mask when working for Chikara and in 2011 also began wearing it again in Mexico.

== Professional wrestling career ==
Pozas made his professional wrestling debut in 1985, adopting the ring name El Pantera (Spanish for "the Panther"), an enmascarado who wore a panther-inspired mask and outfit. On August 9, 1987 El Pantera defeated Guerrero Samurai to win the Mexican National Lightweight Championship, a title he would hold and defend for the next 298 days before losing it back to Guerrero Samurai on June 2, 1988. After the title loss Pantera began teaming with Águila Solitaria and Ciclón Ramírez to form a group known as Las Saetas del Ring (Spanish for "The Arrows of the Ring"). Together Las Saetas won the Nuevo León State Trios Championship and the Veracruz State Trios Championship, before winning the 'Distrito Federal Trios Championship from Los Tarascos in April, 1991. La Saetas later lost the Distrito Federal Trios title to Los Metalicos (Oro, Plata and Bronce). In 1992 Pozas changed his ring character, adopting a colorful yellow, red and blue outfit and mask and the name América as he began working full-time for Consejo Mundial de Lucha Libre (CMLL). On March 8, 1992 América defeated Fuerza Guerrera to win the CMLL World Welterweight Championship, officially moving from the lightweight division (with a weight limit of 70 kg (150 lb)) to the Middleweight division (with a weight limit of 87 kg (192 lb)). América held the title for 131 days before losing the title to El Felino.

In 1993 Pozas abandoned the "América" ring persona and became El Pantera once more. CMLL even acknowledge the change in characters as he was billed as a two time CMLL World Welterweight Champion when he defeated El Felino on June 21, 1994. Pantera held the title for over 600 days, with several successful defenses in the period. By March 1996 Pantera had decided to leave CMLL and lost the Welterweight title to Super Delfin while on tour in Japan. The title change was not sanctioned by CMLL, who stripped Pantera of the title and vacated it. Pantera ended up working for International Wrestling Revolution Group (IWRG) where he became the first ever IWRG Intercontinental Middleweight Champion when he defeated Tony Rivera in the finals of a tournament. Pantera held the title for 157 days in total before being defeated by El Hijo del Gladiador

In early 1998. in 1997 Pantera began working for the World Wrestling Federation (WWF), working a limited number of matches between 1997 and 1999, his highest profile match while in the WWF was a title match with then WWF World Light Heavyweight Champion Taka Michinoku at No Way Out of Texas: In Your House. He worked for WWF's Super Astros programming until the program ended in August 1999. By 2001 Pantera had mended fences with CMLL and began working for the promotion due to a working agreement between CMLL and IWRG. On March 2, 2001 Pantera defeated Nosawa to win his third CMLL World Welterweight Championship, holding it for just 31 days before Nosawa won the title back. After his brief run with the CMLL title Pantera focused more on IWRG winning their Middleweight title once more, defeating Ultimo Vampiro on January 24, 2002. 90 days later he lost the championship to Bombero Infernal. In 2005 Pantera joined a group called La Corporacion, a group that also included Black Tiger and Pentagon Black among others, together the three defeated Los Villaños in a tournament to become the new IWRG Intercontinental Trios Champions on June 2, 2005. The trio held the title for 88 days until they lost to the Casas brothers (Negro Casas, El Felino and Heavy Metal). At some point during the early part of 2006 Pantera left La corporacion and began teaming with El Felino, who defeated Dr. Cerebro and Cerebro Negro to win the IWRG Intercontinental Tag Team Championship on June 29, 2006. On July 14, 2006 Pantera lost a Lucha libre#Luchas de Apuestas (bet match) to Misterioso, Jr., and as a result he was forced to unmask and reveal his real name per. Lucha Libre traditions. Only 16 days later Pantera became a double champion as he pinned El Venero to win the IWRG Middleweight title for the third time. His reign was ended by Nitro on October 9, 2006. The team of Pantera and Felino defended the title on several occasions until the CMLL/IWRG working agreement ended in 2007 and the team lost the titles to Los Junior Capos (Hijo de Cien Caras and Hijo de Mascara Año 2000) on May 31, 2007. Pantera began making appearances for the U.S. based Chikara, wearing his mask when working in the U.S. In 2008 Pantera teamed up with Lince Dorado and Incognito to win the 2008 King of Trios tournament. On September 16, 2015 Los Panteras lost the IWRG tag team titles to Los Gringos VIP (Apolo Estrada Jr. and El Hijo del Diablo) in a Steel cage match that also included Los Traumas.

== Private life ==
Pozas is the uncle of luchador Último Gladiador, and the father of El Hijo del Pantera and Pantera Jr. He had a third son, who died in a car accident in 2005 at age 9.

== Championships and accomplishments ==
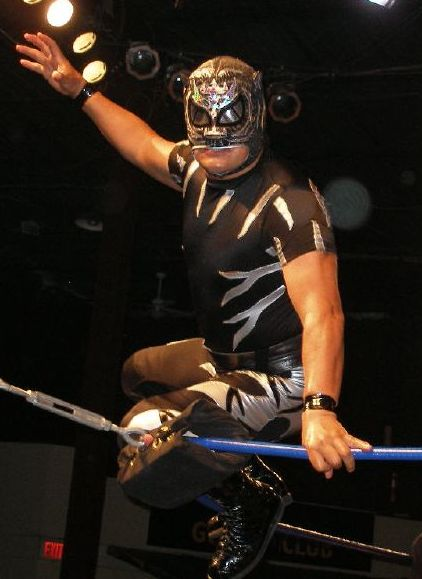
El Pantera at Chikara's 2008 King of Trios tournament.

- Chikara
  - King of Trios (2008) – with Incognito and Lince Dorado
- Consejo Mundial de Lucha Libre
  - CMLL World Welterweight Championship (3 times)
  - Mexican National Lightweight Championship (1 time)
- Comision de Box y Lucha Distrito Federal
  - Distrito Federal Lightweight Championship (1 time)
  - Distrito Federal Trios Championship (1 time) – with Águila Solitaria and Ciclón Ramírez
- International Wrestling Revolution Group
  - IWRG Intercontinental Middleweight Championship (3 times)
  - IWRG Intercontinental Tag Team Championship (3 times) – with El Felino (1), and El Hijo del Pantera (2)
  - IWRG Intercontinental Trios Championship (1 time) – with Black Tiger III and Pentagon Black
  - Copa Higher Power (1998) – with Mr. Niebla, Shocker, El Solar, Star Boy and Mike Segura
  - IWRG Rey del Ring (2011)
- Mexican Regional championships
  - Nuevo León Trios Championship (1 time) – with Águila Solitaria and Ciclón Ramírez
  - Veracruz Trios Championship (1 time) – with Águila Solitaria and Ciclón Ramírez
- Universal Lucha Libre / Universal Wrestling Federation
  - UWF Super Welterweight Championship (3 times)
- World Wrestling Association
  - WWA Middleweight Championship (1 time)

== Luchas de Apuestas record ==
Winner (wager)	Loser (wager)	Location	Event	Date	Notes
El Pantera (mask)	Mohicano I (hair)	N/A	Live event	N/A	
El Pantera II (mask)	Bravo Kid (hair)	Acatitlán, State of Mexico	Live event	N/A	
El Pantera II (mask)	Mr. Cid (mask)	Naucalpan, State of Mexico	Live event	September 4, 1988	
El Pantera II (mask) and Canelo Casas (hair)	Mr. Cid (haur) and Bestia Verde (hair)	Naucalpan, State of Mexico	Live event	September 11, 1998	
El Pantera (mask)	Mr. Fama (mask)	Naucalpan, State of Mexico	Live event	February 11, 1989	
El Pantera (mask)	Tarasco IV (mask)	Naucalpan, State of Mexico	Live event	January 14, 1990	
El Pantera (mask)	Tarasco III (mask)	Mexico City	Live event	June 24, 1990	
El Pantera (mask) and Joe Mercado (hair)	Tarasco I (hair) and Tarasco II (mask)	Naucalpan, State of Mexico	Live event	July 22, 1990	
El Pantera (mask)	Romano García (hair)	León, Guanajuato	Live event	December 3, 1990	
El Pantera (mask)	Bombero Infernal (mask)	Naucalpan, State of Mexico	Live event	December 7, 1997	
Misterioso Jr. (mask)	El Pantera (mask)	Mexico City	Live event	July 14, 2006	(Note: The match also included: El Sagrado, Volador Jr., Nitro, Neutron, Mascara Purpura, Averno, Mephisto, El Felino, Sangre Azteca, La Máscara)
El Dandy (hair)	El Pantera (hair)	Naucalpan, State of Mexico	Live event	June 19, 2008	
Trauma I (mask)	El Pantera (hair)	Naucalpan, State of Mexico	Live event	February 25, 2010	(Note: Pantera was the captain of a trio that lost to Trauma I's team)
