= Cien Caras =

Mexican professional wrestler

Personal information
- Born: J. Carmen Reyes González; May 11, 1949 (age 77) Lagos de Moreno, Jalisco, Mexico
- Children: El Cuatrero (son); Sansón (son)
- Relatives: Máscara Año 2000 (brother); Universo 2000 (brother); Forastero (nephew); Universo 2000 Jr. (nephew); Máscara Año 2000 Jr. (nephew); Cien Caras Místico (adopted son)

Professional wrestling career
- Ring name(s): Cien Caras; Mil Caras; Sanson
- Billed height: 1.91 m (6 ft 3 in)
- Billed weight: 110 kg (243 lb)
- Billed from: Lagos de Moreno, Jalisco
- Trained by: Diablo Velasco; Pantera Negra
- Debut: 1974
- Retired: 2018

J. Carmelo Reyes González (born May 11, 1949) is a Mexican retired professional wrestler, better known by his ring name, Cien Caras ("Hundred Faces"). He is best known for his appearances with the Consejo Mundial de Lucha Libre (CMLL).

== Personal life ==
J. Carmelo Reyes González was born on May 11, 1949, in Lagos de Moreno, Jalisco, Mexico. His younger brothers, Andrés Reyes González (better known as Universo 2000) and Jesús Reyes González (known as Máscara Año 2000) also followed Carmelo into professional wrestling. Three of J. Carmen Reyes' sons also followed in his footsteps, known as the masked wrestlers, known as El Cuatrero and Sansón and Cien Caras Místico. His nephews are also professional wrestlers, known as Forastero, Universo 2000 Jr. and Máscara Año 2000 Jr.

In Mexican wrestling there is a long tradition of wrestlers paying for the rights to use a ring name and be portrayed as a second or third-generation wrestler without actually being related. It has been confirmed that wrestlers Cien Caras Jr. and El Hijo de Cien Caras are not sons of Carlemo Reyes, while it is unclear if Hijo de Máscara Año 2000 is a blood relative or only fictional relatives. Reyes later stated that he allowed the "Cien Caras" name to be rented by other wrestlers as his sons were very young and the time and might not want to become professional wrestlers.

== Professional wrestling career ==
After training under Diablo Velasco and Pantera Negra, Reyes debuted in 1974 under the ring name "Mil Caras", but due to the obvious confusion with Mil Máscaras, he dropped 900 units to become "Cien Caras". Caras was initially a técnico, but quickly developed a more violent wrestling style, and became a rudo. On June 24, 1987, in Nezahualcóyotl, State of Mexico, Caras defeated MS-1 for the NWA World Light Heavyweight Championship. He held the title until March 20, 1988, when he lost to Lizmark in Mexico City, Mexican Federal District. On September 21, 1990, he lost his mask in the culmination of a feud with Rayo de Jalisco, Jr. In late 1990, Caras was wrestling against Jalisco Jr. in a steel cage match when a fan threw a peso coin that hit Caras in the eye. He missed over a month due to the eye injury, and there was concern at the time that his career might be over.

On August 18, 1991, in Monterrey, Caras defeated Konnan el Barbaro to become the second ever CMLL World Heavyweight Champion. He held the title until leaving the CMLL in May 1992, vacating the title in the process. Caras followed Konnan to the newly formed Asistencia Asesoría y Administración, where he continued his feud with Konnan. At the inaugural TripleMania event on April 30, 1993, Caras defeated Konnan in a two out of three falls retirement match by count-out after Jake "The Snake" Roberts interfered on his behalf. Caras remained in the AAA for several years before returning to the CMLL. In one of his last matches in the promotion, he teamed with Heavy Metal and Latin Lover in a championship tournament to crown the first AAA Americas Trios Championship and lost to Los Villanos (Villano III, IV and V) at the tournament finals in Ciudad Nezahualcoyotl on March 8, 1996.

In CMLL, Caras is a member of the stable Los Capos ("The Bosses") with his two younger brothers, Máscara Año 2000 and Universo 2000 (Los Hermanos Dinamita—"The Dynamite Brothers"), and Apolo Dantes. In 2004, Caras and Mascara Año 2000 were defeated by Perro Aguayo, Jr. and El Terrible in a hair versus hair tag team match at the annual Homenaje a Dos Leyendas: El Santo y Salvador Lutteroth show with Caras and Mascara having their heads shaved as a result. Caras and Mascara fought Aguayo, Jr. and his father, Perro Aguayo, in a second hair versus hair match in February 2005, with Caras and Mascara losing once again. The match was billed as Caras's retirement match, but he continued to wrestle in secondary CMLL venues, making him semi-retired.

== Championships and accomplishments ==
- Asistencia Asesoría y Administración
  - IWC World Heavyweight Championship (1 time)
  - Mexican National Trios Championship (1 time) - with Máscara Año 2000 and Universo 2000
- Empresa Mexicana de Lucha Libre / Consejo Mundial de Lucha Libre
  - CMLL World Heavyweight Championship (1 time)
  - Mexican National Heavyweight Championship (2 times)
  - Mexican National Tag Team Championship (2 times) - with Sangre Chicana (1) and Máscara Año 2000 (1)
  - Mexican National Trios Championship (1 time) - with Máscara Año 2000 and Universo 2000
  - NWA World Light Heavyweight Championship (1 time)
  - Homenaje a Dos Leyendas honoree (2014)
- NWA Hollywood Wrestling
  - NWA Americas Tag Team Championship (1 time) - with Victor Rivera
- Pro Wrestling Illustrated
  - PWI ranked him #158 of the 500 best singles wrestlers of the PWI 500 in 1994
  - PWI ranked him #120 of the top 500 singles wrestlers of the "PWI Years" in 2003
- NWA Big Time Wrestling
  - NWA Texas Tag Team Championship (1 time) - with Jose Lothario
- World Wrestling Association
  - WWA World Heavyweight Championship (1 time)
- Wrestling Observer Newsletter
  - Wrestling Observer Newsletter Hall of Fame (2024) - with Máscara Año 2000 and Universo 2000

== Luchas de Apuestas record ==
Winner (wager)	Loser (wager)	Location	Event	Date	Notes
Cien Caras (mask)	Terremoto (mask)	Guadalajara, Jalisco	Live event	June 14, 1982	
Cien Caras (mask)	Alfonso Dantés (hair)	Guadalajara, Jalisco	Live event	N/A	
Cien Caras (mask)	Goro Tanaka (hair)	N/A	Live event	N/A	
Cien Caras (mask)	Terremoto (hair)	Guadalajara, Jalisco	Live event	N/A	
Cien Caras (mask)	Halcón Ortíz (hair)	Mexico City	Live event	May 15, 1984	
Cien Caras (mask)	Siglo XX (mask)	Mexico City	31. Aniversario de Arena México	April 12, 1987	
Cien Caras (mask)	Siglo XX (hair)	Mexico City	Juicio Final	December 4, 1987	
Rayo de Jalisco, Jr. (mask)	Cien Caras (mask)	Mexico City	EMLL 57th Anniversary Show	September 21, 1990	
Cien Caras (hair)	MS-1 (hair)	Tonalá, Jalisco	Live event	August 13, 1993	
Konnan (hair)	Cien Caras (hair)	Los Angeles, California	Live event	July 15, 1995	(Note: This was a triangle Steel cage match that also included Perro Aguayo.)
Cien Caras (hair)	Konnan (career)	Mexico City	Triplemanía I	April 30, 1993	
Rayo de Jalisco Jr. (mask)	Cien Caras (hair)	Lagos de Moreno, Jalisco	Live event	November 29, 1999	
Perro Aguayo (hair)	Cien Caras (hair)	Mexico City	Sin Piedad	December 15, 2000	
Pierroth, Jr. (hair)	Cien Caras (hair)	Mexico City	Live event	June 20, 2003	
Perro Aguayo Jr. and El Terrible (hair)	Cien Caras and Máscara Año 2000 (hair)	Mexico City	Homenaje a Dos Leyendas	March 19, 2004	
Cien Caras and Máscara Año 2000 (hair)	Pierroth and Vampiro (hair)	Mexico City	Sin Piedad	December 17, 2004	
Perro Aguayo and Perro Aguayo, Jr. (hair)	Cien Caras and Máscara Año 2000 (hair)	Mexico City	Live event	March 18, 2005	
Rey Misterio (hair)	Cien Caras (hair)	Tijuana, Baja California	Live event	August 25, 2006	
