= El Hijo de Cien Caras =

Mexican professional wrestler (1976–2010)

Personal information
- Born: Eustacio Jiménez Ibarra; March 21, 1976 Nuevo Padilla, Tamaulipas, Mexico
- Died: November 29, 2010 (aged 34) Coyoacán, Mexico City, Mexico
- Spouse: Maria Felix Rocha
- Children: 4
- Family: L. A. Park (brother); Super Parka (uncle); Volador Jr. (cousin); El Hijo de L.A. Park (nephew); Flyer (great-nephew); L.A. Park Jr. (nephew)

Professional wrestling career
- Ring name(s): Frankenstein; El Hijo de Cien Caras; Suplex
- Billed height: 1.90 m (6 ft 3 in)
- Billed weight: 110 kg (243 lb)
- Trained by: Adolfo Tapia; El Salsero
- Debut: 2001

Eustacio Jiménez Ibarra (March 21, 1976 – November 29, 2010), best known by his ring name El Hijo de Cien Caras ("The Son of Cien Caras"), was a Mexican professional wrestler. Despite his ring name, he was not related to Cien Caras, but instead paid Caras for the rights to use the name, a practice not uncommon in his country. He was in fact a member of the Ibarra wrestling family; relatives include his brother L. A. Park, his cousin Volador Jr. and his uncle Super Parka.

== Professional wrestling career ==
Jiménez was born in a small village named Nuevo Padilla, located in the town of Tula, Tamaulipas, but while he was still a child, his family moved to Tampico, where he grew up. After Jiménez's brother Adolfo had become famous as La Parka, he decided to follow in his footsteps and become a professional wrestler. After being trained by his brother and El Salsero, Jiménez made his debut under a mask as "Frankenstein", named after the monster, working for El Salsero's promotion in Guadalupe, Nuevo León. In 2001, he began wrestling under the ring name "Suplex" (a reference to the wrestling move), and acknowledged publicly that he was the brother of Adolfo Tapia. He worked as Suplex on the Mexican Independent circuit for four years without much success, after which his brother decided that he needed a makeover in order to gain success.

In 2005, he bought the rights to use the ring name "El Hijo de Cien Caras" ("The Son of Cien Caras") and took the ring character of the son of Cien Caras, teaming up with Cien Caras Jr. (who was also not related to Cien Caras). Together the team became known as Los Junior Dinamitas (After their "father's" group Los Hermanos Dinamita). On December 11, 2005, Los Junior Dinamitas defeated Flash I and Flash II to win the Occidente (western states) Tag Team Championship on a show in Guadalajara, Jalisco. Los Junior Dinamitas held the Occidente Tag Team Championship for 546 days in total, making sporadic title defenses in that time.

In 2007, Los Junior Dinamitas began working for International Wrestling Revolution Group (IWRG), with the group being expanded with Máscara Año 2000 Jr. and El Hijo de Máscara Año 2000, who were the actual sons of Máscara Año 2000 (Cien Caras' brother). On May 31, 2007, Hijo de Cien Caras and Máscara Año 2000 Jr. defeated the team of El Pantera and El Felino to win the IWRG Intercontinental Tag Team Championship. El Hijo de Cien Caras' run as double champion lasted under two weeks before losing the belts to the team of El Sagrado and Rayman on June 10, 2007. Following the loss of the Occidente Tag Team Championship Los Junior Dinamitas featured the team of Hijo de Cien Caras and Máscara Año 2000 Jr. more than the other two members as the team quickly established themselves as the most dominant IWRG Tag Team Champions as they held the title for 801 days and made 11 successful title defenses, although they did have a long period of inactivity as a team in early to mid 2009 due to Hijo de Cien Caras not working regularly for IWRG.

During this time period, the two had successful defenses against such teams as Electroshock and El Hijo de Anibal, Pierroth and El Hijo de Pierroth, El Hijo de Solitario and El Hijo de Anibal, Rayo de Jalisco Jr. and El Hijo de Anibal, Dr. Wagner Jr. and Silver King, Silver King and El Dandy, El Fantasma and Fantasma Jr., Scorpio Jr. and Zumbido, Arlequin and Hijo de Pierroth and The Headhunters. Hijo de Cien Caras participated in the 2008 IWRG Rey del Ring tournament on July 24, 2008 and was the 29th, and last wrestler eliminated, only outlasted by the winner Scorpio Jr. On August 9, 2009, Los Junior Dinamitas marathon reign ended when the team of Ricky Cruzz and Scorpio Jr.

=== AAA vs. IWRG feud ===
During an IWRG show on April 29, 2010, AAA wrestler Silver King showed up for the show, allegedly to promote the movie Nacho Libre II, but ended up starting an interpromotional feud between AAA and IWRG. Los Junior Dinamitas quickly came to the defense of IWRG, wrestling against Silver King and other AAA representatives such as Alex Koslov, Chessman and Cibernético. During AAA's Triplemanía XVIII, Los Junior Dinamitas made a surprise appearance moments after Silver King and Último Gladiador won the AAA World Tag Team Championship to challenge the new champions. This marked the first time IWRG wrestlers appeared on AAA television. On June 20, Máscara Año 2000 Jr. and El Hijo de Cien Caras defeated Los Piratos (Pirata Morgan and El Hijo de Pirata Morgan to win the IWRG Tag Team Championship for a second time. On November 14, Los Junior Dinamitas lost the title back to Los Piratos.

== Personal life ==
Jiménez was the brother of professional wrestler Adolfo Tapia Ibarra (L. A. Park) and nephew of Ramón Ibarra Banda (Super Parka), Johnny Ibarra, King Balam and Desalmado as well as the cousin of Volador Jr., the son of Ramón Ibarra. He was also the uncle of El Hijo de L.A. Park and the great-uncle of Flyer. His family outside of wrestling included his brothers Ulises, Alejandro, Gabriel and a sister named Georgina. Despite using the name "Son of Cien Caras", he was not in any way related to Cien Caras (real name Carmelo Reyes González), or the Reyes wrestling family. Jiménez, like many other luchadores, kept his private life a secret and his real name was not a matter of public record until his death.

=== Death ===
In the early morning hours of November 29, 2010, Jiménez was murdered in Coyoacán, Mexico City. According to local officials, Jiménez and a female companion named Adela de Luna González were sitting in a car when they were approached by two unknown individuals who, without saying a word, opened fire and hit Jiménez once in the neck and Luna five times in the chest and neck, before fleeing the scene in a black Dodge Neon. Paramedics pronounced both Jiménez and Luna dead at the scene. Jiménez was survived by his wife Maria Felix Rocha and his children Alan Eustace, Edgar Adolfo, Abraham and a newborn daughter. It was later reported that Luna, a 50-year-old nightclub owner in Mexico City, and her former husband had been investigated by the Mexico City Justice Department for "shady dealings" involving smuggling goods from China and Japan.

== Championships and accomplishments ==
- International Wrestling Revolution Group
  - IWRG Intercontinental Tag Team Championship (2 times) – with Máscara Año 2000 Jr.
- Jalisco State
  - Occidente Tag Team Championship (1 time) – with Cien Caras Jr.

== Luchas de Apuestas record ==
Winner (wager)	Loser (wager)	Location	Event	Date	Notes
Hijo de Cien Caras (mask)	Vampiro Casanova (hair)	Rio Bravo, Tamaulipas	Live event	June 10, 2006	
