= Caravana de Campeones (2017) =

2017 International Wrestling Revolution Group event

- Official poster for the event
- Date: September 17, 2017
- City: Naucalpan, State of Mexico
- Venue: Arena Naucalpan

Event chronology
← Previous; Cabellera vs. Cabellera	Next → El Castillo del Terror

IWRG Caravana de Campeones chronology
← Previous; 2015	Next → 2018

Caravana de Campeones (2017) (Spanish for "Caravan of Champions") was a major annual lucha libre event produced and scripted by Mexican Lucha Libre, or professional wrestling promotion, International Wrestling Revolution Group (IWRG). The show was held on September 17, 2017in Arena Naucalpan, Naucalpan, State of Mexico, Mexico, IWRG's main arena. The 2017 version of the event was the tenth overall show IWRG has held under the Caravana de Campeones banner. As the name indicates the focal point of the show was the various championships promoted by IWRG as five of the six matches were for a championship.

In the main event Los Warriors (Black Warrior and Warrior Jr.) successfully defended the IWRG Intercontinental Tag Team Championship against Herodes Jr. and Máscara Año 2000 Jr. Emperador Azteca successfully defended the IWRG Intercontinental Welterweight Championship, Pantera I kept the IWRG Intercontinental Lightweight Championship and Imposible retained the IWRG Rey del Ring Championship. Relámpago was the only unsuccessful champion as he lost the IWRG Intercontinental Middleweight Championship to Eterno.

== Production ==
=== Background ===
Professional wrestling has a long running tradition of holding shows that feature several championship matches, and at times actually promotes shows as an "all championship matches" show. The earliest documented "All-Championship" show is the EMLL Carnaval de Campeones ("Carnival of Champions") held on January 13, 1965. In 2007 WWE held a pay-per-view called Vengeance: Night of Champions, making WWE Night of Champions a recurring theme. Starting in 2008 the Mexican lucha libre promotion International Wrestling Revolution Group (IWRG) has held a regular major show labeled Caravana de Campeones, Spanish for "Caravan of Champions" using the same concept for a major annual show. All Caravana de Campeones shows have been held in Arena Naucalpan, IWRG's home arena, the location of all of their major shows through the years. The 2015 show was the ninth time IWRG has held a Caravana de Campeones show, having not held one in 2010 but held twice in both 2012 and 2013. IWRG held a Caranana show in October 2015, skipped the show in 2016, The 2017 version of the Caravana de Campeones was the 10th overall show under the name.

=== Storylines ===
The Caravana de Campeones event featured five professional wrestling matches with different wrestlers involved in pre-existing scripted feuds, plots and storylines. Wrestlers were portrayed as either heels (referred to as rudos in Mexico, those that portray the "bad guys") or faces (técnicos in Mexico, the "good guy" characters) as they followed a series of tension-building events, which culminated in a wrestling match or series of matches.

For the 2017 Caravana de Campeones show, five out of the nine championships active in IWRG at the time were defended. Pantera I won the IWRG Intercontinental Lightweight Championship on November 13, 2016 when he defeated Diablo Jr. in the finals of a tournament for the vacant championship. His scheduled match against Aramís would be only the second defense in his championship reign. Relámpago had held the IWRG Intercontinental Middleweight Championship since January 22, 2017, after defeating Imposible to win the championship. While he had held the title for 238 days he had only defended the championship once, on March 5 where he defeated Apolo Estrada Jr. The IWRG Intercontinental Welterweight Championship was held by Emperador Azteca at the time, defeating the Argentinean La Mosca on June 18, 2017.

Imposible had held the IWRG Rey del Ring Championship after winning it at the 2017 Rey del Ring tournament. He had defended the championship twice before, both against Super Mega, whom he would also face at Caravana de Campeones. The father/son duo of Black Warrior and Warrior Jr. won the IWRG Intercontinental Tag Team Championship from the team of El Diablo Jr. I and Black Terry on September 3, 2017, just two weeks before the Caravana de Campeones show, marking their first championship defense.

Mr. Electro had held the IWRG Intercontinental Heavyweight Championship since December 18, 2016 but was not slated to put his title on the line for the show. While La Dinastía de la Muerte ("The Dynasty of Death"; Negro Navarro, Trauma I and Trauma II) had held the IWRG Intercontinental Trios Championship since August 9, 2015 they had not defended it for several months prior to the event and were not booked to defend the championship on September 17, 2017 either. Likewise the current Distrito Federal Trios Champions Los Mariachis Locos (El Hijo del Diablo (5), El Diablo Jr. and Imposible) did not defend on the show either. The reigning IWRG Junior de Juniors Champion, Máscara Año 2000 Jr., did not defend the championship, instead he was challenging for the tag team championship at the Caravana de Campeones show.

== Results ==
No.	Results	Stipulations
1	Lunatic Xtreme and Skanda defeated Ángel Celestial and El Hijo del Bombero	Tag team match
2	Pantera I (c) defeated Aramís	Best two-out-of-three-falls match for the IWRG Intercontinental Lightweight Championship
3	Eterno defeated Relámpago (C)	Best two-out-of-three-falls match for the IWRG Intercontinental Middleweight Championship
4	Imposible (C) defeated Súper Mega	Best two-out-of-three-falls match for the IWRG Rey del Ring Championship
5	Emperador Azteca (c) defeated El Hijo del Pantera	Best two-out-of-three-falls match for the IWRG Intercontinental Welterweight Championship
6	Los Warriors (Black Warrior and Warrior Jr.) (c) defeated Herodes Jr. and Máscara Año 2000 Jr.	Best two-out-of-three-falls match for the IWRG Intercontinental Tag Team Championship
(c) / – the champion(s) heading into the match
