= Rey del Ring (2016) =

2016 International Wrestling Revolution Group event

- Official poster for the Rey del Ring show
- Promotion: International Wrestling Revolution Group
- Date: December 11, 2016 (aired December 12, 2016 (AYM Sports))
- City: Naucalpan, State of Mexico
- Venue: Arena Naucalpan

Event chronology
← Previous; El Castillo del Terror	Next → Arena Naucalpan 39th Anniversary Show

IWRG Rey del Ring chronology
← Previous; 2015	Next → 2017

Anniversary of Lucha Libre in Estado de México Shows chronology
← Previous; 53rd	Next → 55th

The Rey del Ring (2016) show (Spanish for "King of the Ring") was an annual professional wrestling major event produced by Mexican professional wrestling promotion International Wrestling Revolution Group (IWRG), and took place on December 11, 2016 in Arena Naucalpan, Naucalpan, State of Mexico, Mexico. The main event was the Eponymous Rey del Ring tournament, the fourteenth annual version of the tournament, which is IWRG's version of WWE's Royal Rumble 30-man elimination match. The event was also the 54th Anniversary of Lucha Libre in Estado de México

In the main event Máscara Año 2000 Jr. outlasted 29 wrestlers, lastly eliminating Pirata Morgan to win the IWRG Rey del Ring Championship. After the match, Máscara Año 2000 Jr. and Pirata Morgan continued to fight until a challenge was made for a Lucha de Apuestas, or "bet match" between the two. In the semi-final match, champion Dragón Fly successfully defended the AIWA Cruiserweight Championship against long time rival Demonio Infernal. The event also gained notoriety for a backstage incident where Alberto el Patrón beat up Tortuga Rafy after a perceived insult.

== Production ==
=== Background ===
In 2002 the Mexican professional wrestling company International Wrestling Revolution Group (IWRG; at times referred to as Grupo Internacional Revolución in Mexico) held their first ever Rey del Ring ("King of the Ring") event, presenting the eponymous Rey del Ring tournament for the first time. IWRG's Rey del Ring match is a 30-man elimination match similar in concept to the WWE's Royal Rumble match, except that in the Rey del Ring match eliminations can also happen via pinfall or submission. From 2002 until the 2011 event the "prize" for winning the match itself was simply the prestige of outlasting 29 other competitors but did not give the winner any tangible prize. At the 2011 Rey del Ring IWRG introduced the IWR Rey del Ring Championship complete with a belt to symbolize the championship, this belt would be awarded to the winner each year. At that point in time the Rey del Ring title became a championship that could be defended and lost or won in matches in between the annual tournaments. When it is time for the tournament the reigning Rey del Ring champion would vacate the championship. All Rey del Ring shows, as well as the majority of the IWRG shows in general are held in Arena Naucalpan, owned by the promoters of IWRG and their main arena. The 2016 Rey del Ring was the 15th overall Rey del Ring tournament and show to be held by IWRG, as well as the first to be held in the month of December.

=== Storylines ===
The event featured five professional wrestling matches with different wrestlers involved in pre-existing scripted feuds, plots and storylines. Wrestlers were portrayed as either heels (referred to as rudos in Mexico, those that portray the "bad guys") or faces (técnicos in Mexico, the "good guy" characters) as they followed a series of tension-building events, which culminated in a wrestling match or series of matches.

== Event ==
In the opening match, rookies and FILL trainees Black Dragón and Fireman defeated fellow trainees Adrenalina and Araña de Plata two falls to one. In the second match of the night Dragón Fly defended the AIWA Argentina Cruiserweight Championship against long-time rival Demonio Infernal as the storyline feud between the two continued to build and evolve. In the end, Dragón Fly was successful, pinning Demonio Infernal to retain his championship.

Prior to the main event previous IWRG Rey del Ring Champion El Hijo de Máscara Año 2000 came to the ring to surrender the Rey del Ring championship belt that would be awarded to this year's winner of the 30-man Rey del Ring match. The match started with 4 men in the ring, with another wrestler joining the match every two minutes. Wrestlers could be eliminated by being thrown over the top rope, or by pinfall or submission. The 30 man field was narrowed down to Máscara Año 2000 Jr. and Pirata Morgan as the final two. During the closing moments of the match Pirata Morgan Jr. assisted his father, while Golden Magic tried to prevent the interference. During the fight, both Pirata Morgan Jr. and Golden Magic had had their masks pulled off, and ended up wearing their opponents' masks instead. Máscara Año 2000 Jr. pinned Pirata Morgan to claim the championship.

=== Backstage Incident ===
During the show Alberto el Patrón was backstage, visiting his brother El Hijo de Dos Casas along with his then-fiancée Paige. During the visit Rafy, of Las Tortugas Ninja, encountered Paige and made, what el Patrón claimed, an inappropriate interaction with Paige. This led to el Patrón attacking Rafy, beating him up backstage during the show. Rafy later explained that he did not intentionally meant to be disrespectful towards Paige, but admitted his words could have been better chosen.

== Aftermath ==
The main event rivalry between Máscara Año 2000 Jr.and Pirata Morgan led to a Lucha de Apuestas ("Bet match") where both men risked their hair as part of the Arena Naucalpan 39th Anniversary Show that Máscara Año 2000 Jr. won, leaving Pirata Morgan bald. He successfully defended the IWRG Rey del Ring Championship twice, first against Pirata Morgan and later against Trauma I. Máscara Año 2000 Jr was forced to vacate the championship prior to the 2017 Rey del Ring show.

The rivalry between Golden Magic and Pirata Morgan Jr. that began in the closing moments of the Rey del Ring show continued over subsequent IWRG shows. The two were paired up for a Relevos suicida match in the main event of the Arena Naucalpan 39h Anniversary Show as they faced off against the teams of Pantera I and Killer Jr. / Imposible and Relámpago. Both wrestlers survived the match without losing their mask. At the Prisión Fatal show Pirata Mogan Jr. lost a steel cage match to Imposible, a match that also included Golden Magic, and had to unmask. The feud between the two concluded at the February Máscara vs. Cabellera show, where Golden Magic finally pinned his opponent, to earn the right to shave all Pirata Morgan Jr.'s hair off.

== Results ==
No.	Results	Stipulations
1^{D}	Black Dragón and Fireman defeated Adrenalina and Araña de Plata	Best two-out-of-three falls six-man "Lucha Libre rules" tag team match
2^{D}	Dragón Fly (c) defeated Demonio Infernal	Singles match for the AIWA Cruiserweight Championship
3	Máscara Año 2000 Jr. defeated Rafy, Teelo, Mike, Leo, Freelance, Mike Segura, Danny Casas, Veneno, Imposible, El Hijo del Diablo, El Diablo Jr., Black Terry, Heddi Karaoui, Relámpago, Pantera I, Killer Jr., Pirata Morgan, Pirata Morgan Jr., Dr. Cerebro, El Hijo de Dos Caras, Golden Magic, Emperador Azteca, Picudo Jr., Eterno, Oficial AK-47, Astro, Tony Rivera, Mr. Águila and El Hijo del Alebrije	2016 IWRG Rey del Ring, 30-man elimination match
(c) / – the champion(s) heading into the match; D / – this was a dark match
