= Rey del Ring (2020) =

Mexican professional wrestling tournament

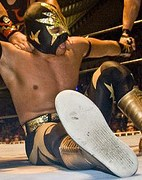
- Rey del Ring competitor Súper Nova
- Date: June 14, 2020; August 23, 2020; August 30, 2020; September 6, 2020
- City: Naucalpan, State of Mexico
- Venue: Arena Naucalpan
- Attendance: 0

Event chronology
| ← Previous; Cinco Luchas en Jaula | Next → — |

IWRG Rey del Ring chronology
| ← Previous; 2019 | Next → — |

The Rey del Ring (2020) (Spanish for "King of the Ring") was a professional wrestling, or lucha libre, tournament held between June 14 and September 6, 2020. The tournament was produced and scripted by Mexican professional wrestling promotion International Wrestling Revolution Group (IWRG), and took place over several weeks from Arena Naucalpan located in Naucalpan, State of Mexico, Mexico. This was the seventeenth time IWRG has held their annual IWRG Rey del Ring tournament, but due to the COVID-19 pandemic and social distancing restrictions imposed by the Mexican government was not a 30-man elimination match like other years, but instead, a 30-man single-elimination tournament, filmed in the empty Arena Naucalpan for broadcast. Shun Skywalker, the winner of the 2020 Rey del Ring faced the reigning IWRG Rey del Ring Championship holder, Demonio Infernal, a week after the tournament finals in the final stage of the tournament.

== Production ==
=== Background ===
The Mexican professional wrestling company International Wrestling Revolution Group (IWRG; at times referred to as Grupo Internacional Revolución in Mexico) started their annual Rey del Ring ("King of the Ring") event in 2002, creating an annual event around the eponymous Rey del Ring match, a 30-man elimination match similar in concept to the WWE's Royal Rumble match although in IWRG pinfalls and submission could also lead to elimination unlike the Royal Rumble. From 2002 until the 2011 event the "prize" for winning the match itself was simply the prestige of outlasting 29 other competitors, but at the 2011 Rey del Ring IWRG introduced the IWR Rey del Ring Championship complete with a belt to symbolize the championship that would be awarded to the winner each year. At that point in time the Rey del Ring title became a championship that could be defended and lost or won in matches in between the annual tournaments. For the tournament the champion would vacate the Rey del Ring Championship prior to the actual Rey del Ring match itself. All Rey del Ring shows, as well as the majority of the IWRG shows in general are held in Arena Naucalpan, owned by the promoters of IWRG and their main arena. The 2020 Rey del Ring will be the 18th over all Rey del Ring tournament held by IWRG.

=== Storylines ===
The event featured four professional wrestling matches with different wrestlers involved in pre-existing scripted feuds, plots and storylines. Wrestlers were portrayed as either heels (referred to as rudos in Mexico, those that portray the "bad guys") or faces (técnicos in Mexico, the "good guy" characters) as they followed a series of tension-building events, which culminated in a wrestling match or series of matches. IWRG promoted the show without announcing a single participant ahead of time.

Demonio Infernal won the 2019 Rey del Ring tournament and championship on May 19. His first title defense took place on June 19, at the Metaleon benefit show where he defeated Aramís. Next up Demonio Infernal defeated Fresero Jr. on two occasions, followed by another successful defense on January 19, 2020 where he defeated Fuerza Guerrera Next Generation. The most recent championship defense took place on February 8 during an "Invasion Americana" show on the independent circuit. Demonio Infernal and Aaron Sykes wrestled to a draw, which meant that Demonio Infernal retained the championship.

MasLuchas revealed that the 2020 Rey del Ring tournament would have a different format in 2020. Normally the Rey del Ring tournament includes up to 30 wrestlers in the ring. Due to various social distancing measurements imposed by the Mexican government due to COVID-19, IWRG decided to instead use a single-elimination tournament, with only two wrestlers and a referee in the ring at a time. They also announced that the shows would be without fans in attendance, but instead taped for television. The tournament starts with two blocks of 15 wrestlers until only one remains. For the third show, the two block winners face off, followed by the winner wrestling Demonio Infernal for the IWRG Rey del Ring Championship in the fourth week of the tournament.

== Results ==
June 14, 2020

| No. | Results | Stipulations | Times |
|---|---|---|---|
| 1 | Atomic Star defeated Tromba | Singles match | 09:45 |
| 2 | Avisman defeated Eragón | Singles match | 10:31 |
| 3 | Diosa Quetzal defeated Fulgor I | Singles match | 08:33 |
| 4 | Puma de Oro vs. Yoshioka ended in a double countout | Singles match | 13:40 |
| 5 | Shun Skywalker defeated Shil-Ka, Alas de Plata, Fresero Jr., Lunatik Extreme, Chico Che, Jessy Ventura, Ovett, El Hijo de Dos Caras, Fly Star, Relámpago, Toxin, El Hijo del Alebrije, Súper Nova, and Dragón Bane | 2020 IWRG Rey del Ring semi-final Battle royal | — |

August 23, 2020

| No. | Results | Stipulations |
|---|---|---|
| 1 | Freelance defeated Chicanito | Singles match |
| 2 | Puma de Oro defeated Fly Star | Singles match |
| 3 | Dragón Bane defeated Lunatic Xtreme | Singles match |
| 4 | El Hijo de Canis Lupus defeated Death Metal, Chavin, Capo del Norte, Oficial AK-47, Herodes Jr., El Hijo del Pirata Morgan, Heddi Karaoui, Alas de Oro, Trauma I, Tortuga Mike, Lolita, Séptimo Dragón, Ludark Shaitan, and Diosa Quetzal | 2020 IWRG Rey del Ring semi-final Battle royal |

August 30, 2020

| No. | Results | Stipulations |
|---|---|---|
| 1 | Rey Halcón Jr. defeated Atomic Star | Singles match |
| 2 | Toxin defeated Puma de Oro | Singles match |
| 3 | Dragón Bane defeated Yoshioka | Singles match |
| 4 | Demonio Infernal and Fresero Jr. defeated Los Traumas (Trauma I and Trauma II) | Tag team match |
| 5 | Shun Skywalker defeated El Hijo de Canis Lupus | 2020 IWRG Rey del Ring finals |

September 6, 2020

| No. | Results | Stipulations |
|---|---|---|
| 1 | Legendario defeated Dick Angelo 3G | Singles match |
| 2 | Diosa Quetzal defeated Lilith Dark | Singles match |
| 3 | Toxin defeated Puma de Oro | Singles match |
| 4 | Los Strippers Big (Big Chicoche and Big Ovett), and Veneno defeated Capo del Norte, Capo del Sur, and Fresero Jr. | Six-man tag team match |
| 5 | Dragón Bane and Trauma I defeated El Hijo de Canis Lupus and Trauma II | Relevos Increíbles match |
| 6 | Demonio Infernal (c) defeated Shun Skywalker | Best two-out-of-three falls match for the IWRG Rey del Ring Championship |
(c) / – the champion(s) heading into the match
