= Arena Naucalpan 39th Anniversary Show =

2016 International Wrestling Revolution Group event

- IWRG's official poster for the show
- Promotion: International Wrestling Revolution Group
- Date: December 21, 2016
- City: Naucalpan, State of Mexico
- Venue: Arena Naucalpan

Event chronology
← Previous; Rey del Ring	Next → Prisión Fatal/IWRG 21st Anniversary Show

Arena Naucalpan Anniversary Shows chronology
← Previous; Arena Naucalpan 38th Anniversary Show	Next → Arena Naucalpan 40th Anniversary Show

The Arena Naucalpan 39th Anniversary Show was a major annual professional wrestling supercard show produced by Mexican professional wrestling promotion International Wrestling Revolution Group (IWRG), which took place on December 21, 2016, in Arena Naucalpan, Naucalpan, State of Mexico, Mexico. The show celebrated the 39th Anniversary of the construction of Arena Naucalpan, IWRG's main venue.

The main event was a three-team Relevos Suicida, losers advance, match with the first team to lose being forced to immediately wrestle each other for their masks, under Luchas de Apuestas ("bet match") rules. The team of Pantera I and Killer Jr. lost to the teams of Golden Magic/Pirata Morgan Jr. and Imposible/Relámpago. In the end Pantera I pinned Killer Jr. forcing him to unmask afterward. Another featured match saw Pirata Morgan defeat Máscara Año 2000 Jr. in a "hair vs. hair" match and was shaved bald. In the second match of the night Las Tortugas Ninja (Leo, Mike, and Rafy) successfully defended the Distrito Federal Trios Championship against Cerebro Negro and Los Oficiales (Oficial AK-47, and Oficial Fierro).

== Production ==
=== Background ===
Promoter Adolfo Moreno had promoted Lucha Libre, or professional wrestling in Naucalpan, State of Mexico, Mexico prior to financing the building of Arena Naucalpan that opened in late 1976. Originally Moreno worked together with the Universal Wrestling Association (UWA) and then later Consejo Mundial de Lucha Libre (CMLL) as a local promoter. On January 1, 1996, Moreno created International Wrestling Revolution Group (IWRG) as an independent promotion. IWRG celebrates the anniversary of Arena Naucalpan each year in December with a major show, making it the second oldest, still promoted show series in the world. pre-dating WrestleMania by eight years. Only the CMLL Anniversary Show series has a longer history. The 2015 Arena Naucalpan anniversary show will mark the 38th Anniversary of Arena Naucalpan. The Anniversary shows, as well as the majority of the IWRG shows in general are held in Arena Naucalpan.

=== Storylines ===
The event featured six professional wrestling matches with different wrestlers involved in pre-existing scripted feuds, plots and storylines. Wrestlers were portrayed as either heels (referred to as rudos in Mexico, those that portray the "bad guys") or faces (técnicos in Mexico, the "good guy" characters) as they followed a series of tension-building events, which culminated in a wrestling match or series of matches.

The main event of the 39th anniversary show was originally announced as a two-team Relevos Suicida, losers advance, match between the teams of Pantera I/Killer Jr. and Golden Magic/Pirata Morgan Jr. while Imposible and Relámpago were scheduled to face off in a singles match as part of their ongoing storyline. (Note: Poster has the originally announced matches.) Killer Jr. did not show up for the IWRG show on the Sunday prior to the show, so officials announced that the match was changed to have Impossible and Relámpago replace Pantera I and Killer Jr. By show time the match was changed back to the original match, but Impossible demanded to be in the match, changing it to a three-team match instead.

== Event ==
In the opening match the trio of Aramís, Black Dragón, and Dragón Fly defeated Araña de Plata, Demonio Infernal, and Skanda, two falls to one. The second match was originally scheduled to have Oficial 911 join his tag team partners Oficial AK-47 and Oficial Fierro as Los Oficiales challenged Las Tortugas Ninja (Leo, Mike and Rafy) for the Distrito Federal Trios Championship, but on the night of the show Cerebro Negro took his place in the match. Las Tortugas retained the championship, making their fourth successful defense.

Prior to the third match Trauma I was recognized as the "IWRG Wrestler of the year" based on a fan vote on Facebook. The match was won by Danny Casas, Mr. Electro, and Veneno defeated Eterno, Heddi Karaoui, and Trauma I in a match where Mr. Electro and Trauma I fought most of the time outside the ring. Afterward, Mr. Electro challenged Trauma I and his brother Trauma II to a Lucha de Apuestas match against himself and his brother Sharlie Rockstar.

For the fourth match of the night Pirata Morgan was accompanied to the ring by his son Pirata Morgan Jr. for the hair vs. hair match. After Morgan and Máscara Año 2000 Jr. split the first two falls between them, Pirata Morgan Jr. helped his father out, allowing Pirata Morgan to pin Máscara Año 2000 Jr. while holding on to the ropes for leverage. Afterwards, Máscara Año 2000 Jr. was forced to let a barber shave all his hair off as a result of his loss.

The first team to be pinned in the three-team Relevos suicida would immediately have to fight each other for their masks. For the main event long-time rivals Golden Magic and Pirata Morgan Jr. and Imposible and Relámpago both put their differences aside for this match, allowing them to defeat Killer Jr. and Pantera I. The two faced off in a one fall match that saw both wrestlers bleed significantly as each fought for their mask. In the end Pantera I won the match, forcing Killer Jr. to unmask. After his loss Killer Jr. announced that his name was Julian Hernandez Quiroz, that he had been a wrestler for 25 years at that point.

== Aftermath ==
Killer Jr. made sporadic appearances for IWRG after unmasking, participating in the 2017 Rebelión de los Juniors tournament, and the 2017 Rey del Ring.

The two teams that survived the main event (Golden Magic, Pirata Morgan Jr., Impossible and Relámpago) all faced off in the main event of IWRG's next major show, the January Prisión Fatal show. In he match Impossible defeated Pirata Morgan Jr., forcing him to unmask as a result and state his real name. The feud between the two concluded at the February Máscara vs. Cabellera show, where Golden Magic finally pinned his opponent, to earn the right to shave all Pirata Morgan Jr.'s hair off.

== Results ==
No.	Results	Stipulations
1	Aramís, Black Dragón, and Dragón Fly defeated Araña de Plata, Demonio Infernal, and Skanda	Best two-out-of-three falls six-man tag team match
2	Las Tortugas Ninja (Leo, Mike, and Rafy) (c) defeated Cerebro Negro and Los Oficiales (Oficial AK-47, and Oficial Fierro)	Best two-out-of-three falls six-man tag team match for the Distrito Federal Trios Championship
3	Danny Casas, Mr. Electro, and Veneno defeated Eterno, Heddi Karaoui, and Trauma I	Best two-out-of-three falls six-man tag team match
4	Pirata Morgan defeated Máscara Año 2000 Jr.	Best two-out-of-three falls Luchas de Apuestas. hairs vs. hairs. match
5	Killer Jr. and Pantera I lost to Golden Magic and Pirata Morgan Jr.; Imposible and Relámpago	Relevos Suicida, losers advance, match
6	Pantera I defeated Killer Jr.	Best two-out-of-three falls tag team Luchas de Apuestas. hairs vs. hairs. match
(c) / – the champion(s) heading into the match
