= Rey del Ring (2009) =

2009 International Wrestling Revolution Group event

- Official poster for the event
- Promotion: International Wrestling Revolution Group
- Date: July 16, 2009
- City: Naucalpan, State of Mexico
- Venue: Arena Naucalpan

Event chronology
← Previous; Prisión Fatal	Next → Festival de las Máscaras

Rey del Ring chronology
← Previous; 2008	Next → 2011

The 2009 Rey del Ring (Spanish for "King of the Ring") was a major lucha libre event produced and scripted by the Mexican International Wrestling Revolution Group (IWRG) professional wrestling promotion on July 16, 2009. The show was held in Arena Naucalpan, Naucalpan, State of Mexico, which is IWRG's primary venue. The show was the eight overall IWRG Rey del Ring show held, with the first being held in 2002.

The focal point of the show was the eponymous Rey del Ring tournament. a 30-man elimination match similar in concept to the WWE's Royal Rumble match. The match was won by Ricky Cruzz as he lastly eliminated El Veneno to win the tournament. Olimpico is credited with three eliminations, the most of any wrestler in the 2009 Rey del Ring tournament as he eliminated Arlequín Amarillo, Fantasma de la Opera and Rigo.

== Production ==
=== Background ===
The Mexican professional wrestling company International Wrestling Revolution Group (IWRG; at times referred to as Grupo Internacional Revolución in Mexico) started to hold their annual Rey del Ring ("King of the Ring") tournament on J 2002, creating an annual event around the eponymous Rey del Ring match, a 30-man elimination match similar in concept to the WWE's Royal Rumble match. From 2002 through 2007 the Rey del Ring match started with four wrestlers in the ring, only adding another wrestler when someone was pinned, forced to submit, was disqualified or counted out, which meant that no more than four wrestlers would be in the ring at the same time. Unlike the Royal Rumble the Rey del Ring rules allowed wrestlers to be eliminated by pinfall etc., not by being thrown over the top rope to the floor as regular battle royal rules describe. From 2002 through 2010 the Rey del Ring winner did not get any specific prize for winning the match, except for the 2004 Rey del Ring tournament where the winner also won the vacant IWRG Intercontinental Middleweight Championship. Fantasy won the Rey del Ring as well as the IWRG Intercontinental Middleweight Championship. For the 2008 Rey del Ring tournament IWRG adjusted the rules a little, instead of four wrestlers starting in the ring and someone being added only upon elimination, two wrestlers would start out and at timed intervals, two minutes in this case, another wrestler would enter the ring to join the match.

The 2009 Rey del Ring tournament was held under the same "timed entrants" rules that were introduced for the 2008 tournament. The show, as all of IWRG's major shows was held in Arena Naucalpan in Naucalpan, State of Mexico, IWRG's primary venue. The 2009 show was the eighth year in a row IWRG held a Rey del Ring, a streak they would break in 2010 by not holding a Rey del Ring tournament that year.

=== Storylines ===
The event featured at least two professional wrestling matches with different wrestlers involved in pre-existing scripted feuds, plots and storylines. Wrestlers were portrayed as either heels (referred to as rudos in Mexico, those that portray the "bad guys") or faces (técnicos in Mexico, the "good guy" characters) as they followed a series of tension-building events, which culminated in a wrestling match or series of matches.

== Event ==
The show started out with a tag team match, contested under "best two-out-of-three-falls" rules, with the team of Blasfemia and Carta Brava Jr. defeating Eragon and Guizmo two falls to one.

The thirty competitors in the Rey del Ring tournament were Angélico, Arlequín Amarillo, Arlequín Verde. Avisman. Black Terry, Capitan Muerte, Cerebro Negro, Chico Che, Ricky Cruz, Dr. Cerebro, Exodia, Fantasma de la Opera, Goleador, Máscara Año 2000 Jr., Máscara Magnifica, Megatronik, Negro Navarro, Oficial 911, Oficial AK-47, Olímpico, Pendulo, Rigo, Sauron, Tetsuya Bushi, Toxico, Trauma I, Trauma II, El Veneno, Xibalba and Yack. The Rey del Ring match lasted one hour and forty-eight minutes and came to an end when Ricky Cruzz eliminated Veneno as the last man to win the entire tournament.

During the match Olímpico eliminated a total of three wrestlers, Arlequín Amarillo, Fantasma de la Opera and Rigo, the most of any of the competitors. Rigo was the thirtieth entrant in the match and ended up suffering three losses before he finally left the ring. First he was pinned by Máscara Año 2000 Jr. but remained in the ring afterwards, later Ricky Cruzz forced Rigo to submit to a Figure four leglock but again Rigo remained in the ring afterwards. Finally, Olímpico pinned Rigo after a double suplex from Olímpico and Máscara Año 2000 Jr., at which point Rigo finally left the ring.

== Aftermath ==
After holding a Rey del Ring for eight years in a row IWRG did not hold a tournament in 2010 for undisclosed reasons. In 2011 IWRG introduced an actual "IWRG Rey del Ring Championship" that would be awarded to the winner of the tournament. The championship could then be defended in regular matches between the annual tournaments. That tournament and the belt was won by Pantera.

The 2008 Rey del Ring tournament was won by Scorpio Jr., who would later team up with Ricky Cruzz, the 2009 Rey del Ring winner, to form a regular tag team. On August 9, 2011, Scorpio And Cruzz defeated Los Junior Dinamitas ("The Junior Dynamites"; El Hijo de Cien Caras and Máscara Año 2000 Jr.) to win the IWRG Intercontinental Tag Team Championship. Cruzz only worked a few more matches for IWRG after winning the IWRG Intercontinental Tag Team Championship, returning to his native Puerto Rico in August 2009. As a result of Cruzz leaving IWRG the promotion vacated the championship in early 2010. Cruzz would return to Mexico in 2015, winning the 2015 Rey del Ring tournament and the championship. He later returned to his native Puerto Rico with the Rey del Ring Championship and even defended it on a World Wrestling League (WWL) show in August, 2015.

== Results ==
No.	Results	Stipulations	Times
1	Blasfemia and Carta Brava Jr. defeated Eragon and Guizmo	Best two-out-of-three-falls tag team match	—
2	Ricky Cruz won the Rey del Ring	2009 IWRG Rey del Ring, 30-man tournament	1:48:00

=== Rey del Ring entrances and eliminations ===
A new entrant came out approximately every two minutes.

Draw	Entrant	Order	Eliminated by
1	Pendulo	9	Megatronik
2	Arlequín Verde	4	Negro Navarro
3	Trauma I	6	Xibalba
4	Xibalba	8	Capitan Muerte
5	Goleador	3	Unknown
6	Sauron	1	Unknown
7	Yack	2	Unknown
8	Negro Navarro	7	Dr. Cerebro
9	Megatronik	10	Máscara Año 2000 Jr.
10	Dr. Cerebro	11	Máscara Año 2000 Jr.
11	Máscara Magnifica	5	Capitan Muerte
12	Avisman	12	Unknown
13	Capitan Muerte	13	Angélico
14	Tetsuya Bushi	14	Oficial 911
15	Exodia	15	Angélico
16	Máscara Año 2000 Jr.	27	Unknown
17	Oficial 911	18	Toxico
18	Angélico	17	Oficial AK-47
19	Black Terry	16	Ofical 911
20	Ricky Cruz	30	2009 Rey del Ring Winner
21	Oficial AK-47	19	Cerebro Negro
22	Arlequín Amarillo	20	Olímpico
23	Olímpico	28	Ricky Cruzz
24	Cerebro Negro	22	Veneno
25	Toxico	21	Trauma II
26	Veneno	29	Ricky Cruzz
27	Chico Che	23	Trauma II
28	Trauma II	24	Fantasma de la Opera
29	Fantasma de la Opera	25	Olímpico
30	Rigo	26	Olímpico
