= Rey del Ring (2018) =

2018 International Wrestling Revolution Group event

- Official poster for the Rey del Ring show
- Date: May 20, 2018
- City: Naucalpan, State of Mexico
- Venue: Arena Naucalpan

Event chronology
| ← Previous; Guerra del Golfo | Next → Cabellera vs. Cabellera |

IWRG Rey del Ring chronology
| ← Previous; 2017 | Next → 2019 |

The Rey del Ring (2018) show (Spanish for "King of the Ring") was a major annual lucha libre event produced and scripted by Mexican professional wrestling promotion International Wrestling Revolution Group (IWRG), and took place on May 20, 2018 in Arena Naucalpan, Naucalpan, State of Mexico, Mexico. The main event was the Eponymous IWRG Rey del Ring tournament, the sixteenth annual version of the tournament, IWRG's version of WWE's Royal Rumble, multi-man elimination event.

In IWRG the winner of the Rey del Ring tournament also wins the IWRG Rey del Ring Championship, after the previous champion Imposible vacated the championship prior to the match. Emperador Azteca won the match and the championship by outlasting 29 other wrestlers. The show featured three additional matches, including a Lucha de Apuestas, hair vs. hair match where Lunatic Xtreme defeated Gallo Frances, forcing Gallo Frances to be shaved bald as a result.

== Production ==
=== Background ===
The Mexican professional wrestling company International Wrestling Revolution Group (IWRG; at times referred to as Grupo Internacional Revolución in Mexico) started their annual Rey del Ring ("King of the Ring") event in 2002, creating an annual event around the eponymous Rey del Ring match, a 30-man elimination match similar in concept to the WWE's Royal Rumble match. From 2002 until the 2011 event the "prize" for winning the match itself was simply the prestige of outlasting 29 other competitors, but at the 2011 Rey del Ring IWRG introduced the IWR Rey del Ring Championship complete with a belt to symbolize the championship that would be awarded to the winner each year. At that point in time the Rey del Ring title became a championship that could be defended and lost or won in matches in between the annual tournaments. For the tournament the champion would vacate the Rey del Ring Championship prior to the actual Rey del Ring match itself. All Rey del Ring shows, as well as the majority of the IWRG shows in general are held in Arena Naucalpan, owned by the promoters of IWRG and their main arena. The 2018 Rey del Ring was the sixteenth over all Rey del Ring tournament held by IWRG.

=== Storylines ===
The event featured five professional wrestling matches with different wrestlers involved in pre-existing scripted feuds, plots and storylines. Wrestlers were portrayed as either heels (referred to as rudos in Mexico, those that portray the "bad guys") or faces (técnicos in Mexico, the "good guy" characters) as they followed a series of tension-building events, which culminated in a wrestling match or series of matches.

== Results ==
| No. | Results | Stipulations |
|---|---|---|
| 1 | Toto defeated Death Metal | Best two-out-of-three-falls match |
| 2 | Atomic Star and Dragon Bane defeated Hijo Del Olimpico and Mexica | Best two-out-of-three-falls tag team match |
| 3 | Lunatic Xtreme defeated Gallo Frances | Lucha de Apuestas, hair vs. hair match |
| 4 | Emperador Azteca defeated Oficial 911 and Apolo Estrada Jr. and Black Dragon and Capo del Norte and Capo del Sur and Cerebro Negro and Demonio Infernal and Diablo Jr. and El Hijo de Canis Lupus and El Hijo de Dos Caras and El Hijo del Alebrije and El Hijo del Medico Asesino and El Pantera II and Eterno and Freelance and Leo and Machine Rocker and Máscara Año 2000 Jr. and Mike and Obett and Relampago and Rokambole Jr. and Silver King and Super Brazo Jr. and Super Mega and Trauma I and Trauma II and Uro Rocker and Veneno | 2018 Rey del Ring match for the IWRG Rey del Ring Championship |
