= Rey del Ring (2019) =

Mexican professional wrestling show

- Official poster for the event including an homage to Silver King
- Date: May 19, 2019
- City: Naucalpan, State of Mexico
- Venue: Arena Naucalpan

Event chronology
← Previous; Guerra del Golfo	Next → Festival de las Máscaras

IWRG Rey del Ring chronology
← Previous; 2018	Next → 2020

The Rey del Ring (2019) show (Spanish for "King of the Ring") was an annual lucha libre supercard event produced and scripted by Mexican professional wrestling promotion International Wrestling Revolution Group (IWRG), and took place on May 19, 2019 in Arena Naucalpan located in Naucalpan, State of Mexico, Mexico. The main event was the Eponymous IWRG Rey del Ring tournament, the sixteenth annual version of the tournament, The Rey del Ring tournament is IWRG's version of WWE's Royal Rumble, multi-man elimination event.

The winner of the Rey del Ring tournament also won the IWRG Rey del Ring Championship, after the previous champion Emperador Azteca vacated the championship prior to the match. Demonio Infernal won the match and the championship by outlasting 30 other wrestlers. The show featured hree additional matches.

== Production ==
=== Background ===
The Mexican professional wrestling company International Wrestling Revolution Group (IWRG; at times referred to as Grupo Internacional Revolución in Mexico) started their annual Rey del Ring ("King of the Ring") event in 2002, creating an annual event around the eponymous Rey del Ring match, a 30-man elimination match similar in concept to the WWE's Royal Rumble match although in IWRG pinfalls and submission could also lead to elimination unlike the Royal Rumble. From 2002 until the 2011 event the "prize" for winning the match itself was simply the prestige of outlasting 29 other competitors, but at the 2011 Rey del Ring IWRG introduced the IWR Rey del Ring Championship complete with a belt to symbolize the championship that would be awarded to the winner each year. At that point in time the Rey del Ring title became a championship that could be defended and lost or won in matches in between the annual tournaments. For the tournament the champion would vacate the Rey del Ring Championship prior to the actual Rey del Ring match itself. All Rey del Ring shows, as well as the majority of the IWRG shows in general are held in Arena Naucalpan, owned by the promoters of IWRG and their main arena. The 2019 Rey del Ring was the 17th over all Rey del Ring tournament held by IWRG.

IWRG had originally announced that Silver King would be participating in the Rey del Ring match, but Silver King died from a heart attack on May 10, 2019 during a wrestling event. After Emperador Azteca had won the Rey del Ring Championship the previous year, he defended the championship only once in the interceding year, successfully defending it against Imposible on a FILLM show in September before being forced to vacated it for the 2019 tournament.

=== Storylines ===
The event featured four professional wrestling matches with different wrestlers involved in pre-existing scripted feuds, plots and storylines. Wrestlers were portrayed as either heels (referred to as rudos in Mexico, those that portray the "bad guys") or faces (técnicos in Mexico, the "good guy" characters) as they followed a series of tension-building events, which culminated in a wrestling match or series of matches. IWRG promoted the show without announcing a single participant ahead of time.

== Results ==
No.	Results	Stipulations
1	Ángel Estrella and Atomic Star defeated Baby Star and Shere Khan	Best two-out-of-three falls tag team match
2	Alas de Acero, Iron Kid, and Príncipe Aéreo defeated Guerrero Olímpico, Marado, and Mosca by disqualification	Best two-out-of-three falls six-man tag team match
3	Death Metal defeated Oficial Liderk	Best two-out-of-three falls match
4	Demonio Infernal won the Rey del Ring; Also in the match: Aramis, Canibal Jr., Capo del Norte, Capo del Sur, Chico Che, Congo, Dinamic Black, Eragón, Apolo Estrada Jr., Fantasma de la Ópera, Fly Warrior, El Hijo del Alebrije, El Hijo de Canis Lupus, El Hijo del Medico Asesino, Huracán Ramírez Jr.Imposible, Tortuga Leo, Lunatik Xtreme, Manchas, Máscara Año 2000 Jr., Metaleón, Multifacético, Ovett, Pasion Kristal, Relámpago, Séptimo Rayo, Shil-Kah, Trauma I, Jessy Ventura, and Zumbi	2019 31-man Rey del Ring match for the IWRG Rey del Ring Championship
