= IWRG Ejecucion Total =

2018 International Wrestling Revolution Group event

IWRG Ejecution Total
- Official poster for the show
- Date: August 8, 2018
- City: Naucalpan, State of Mexico
- Venue: Arena Naucalpan

Event chronology
← Previous; Zona de Ejecucion	Next → Caravana de Campeones

The Ejecution Total (Spanish for "Total Execution") was a major lucha libre event produced and scripted by Mexican Lucha Libre, or professional wrestling promotion, International Wrestling Revolution Group (IWRG). The show was held on August 8, 2018, in Arena Naucalpan, Naucalpan, State of Mexico, Mexico, IWRG's main arena.

The show centered around the Eponymous Ejecution Total main event match, a multi-man elimination match between four teams of Trios. The Ejecution Total match starts with one representative of each trio in the ring or on the edge of the ring, when a wrestler is eliminated the next person on the team replace them in the ring until three of the four teams have all been eliminated. For the first ever Ejecution Total match the team of Imposible, Relampargo and X-Fly eliminated the teams of Los Tortugas Ninjas (Leo, Mike, Rafy) and Capo del Norte, Capo del Sur, Pit Bull and Aramís, El Hijo de Canis Lupus and Pasion Crystal.The show featured six additional matches, including El Hijo del Alebrije successfully defending the IWRG Junior de Juniors Championship against El Hijo de Pirata Morga.

== Storylines ==
The event featured five professional wrestling matches with different wrestlers involved in pre-existing scripted feuds, plots and storylines. Wrestlers were portrayed as either heels (referred to as rudos in Mexico, those that portray the "bad guys") or faces (técnicos in Mexico, the "good guy" characters) as they followed a series of tension-building events, which culminated in a wrestling match or series of matches.

== Results ==
No.	Results	Stipulations
1	Shadow Boy defeated Chicanito	Best two-out-of-three-falls match
2	Diablo Jr. and Lunatic Extreme defeated Black Shadow II and Mexica	Best two-out-of-three-falls tag team match
3	Freelance defeated Dragon Bane	Best two-out-of-three-falls match
4	Trauma II defeated Eterno	Best two-out-of-three-falls match
5	El Hijo del Alebrije (c) defeated Hijo de Pirata Morgan	Best two-out-of-three-falls match for the IWRG Junior de Juniors Championship
6	Trauma I defeated El Hijo del Medico Asesino	Best two-out-of-three-falls match
7	Imposible, Relampago and X-Fly defeated Los Tortugas Ninjas (Leo, Mike and Rafy) and Capo del Norte, Capo del Sur and Pit Bull and Aramís, El Hijo de Canis Lupus and Pasion Crystal	Ejecution Total elimination match
(c) / – the champion(s) heading into the match
