= Rey del Ring (2012) =

2012 International Wrestling Revolution Group event

- Official poster depicting several of the Rey del Ring competitors
- Promotion: International Wrestling Revolution Group
- Date: May 31, 2012 (aired June 2, 2012)
- City: Naucalpan, State of Mexico
- Venue: Arena Naucalpan

Event chronology
← Previous; Caravana de Campeones	Next → Legado Final

IWRG Rey del Ring chronology
← Previous; 2011	Next → 2013

Rey del Ring (2012) (Spanish for "King of the Ring") was an annual professional wrestling major event produced by Mexican professional wrestling promotion International Wrestling Revolution Group (IWRG), which took place on May 31, 2012 in Arena Naucalpan, Naucalpan, State of Mexico, Mexico. The Rey del Ring tournament was taped for television and shown on TVC Deportes on June 6, 2012. The main event was the Eponymous IWRG Rey del Ring tournament, the tenth annual version of the tournament, IWRG's version of World Wrestling Entertainment's Royal Rumble event. 30 men competed in the Rey del Ring, which was won by Oficial Factor when he eliminated Hijo del Pirata Morgan to claim the victory as well as the Rey del Ring Championship belt.

== Production ==
=== Background ===
The Mexican professional wrestling company International Wrestling Revolution Group (IWRG; at times referred to as Grupo Internacional Revolución in Mexico) started their annual Rey del Ring ("King of the Ring") event in 2002, creating an annual event around the eponymous Rey del Ring match, a 30-man elimination match similar in concept to the WWE's Royal Rumble match. From 2002 until the 2011 event the "prize" for winning the match itself was simply the prestige of outlasting 29 other competitors, but at the 2011 Rey del Ring IWRG introduced the IWR Rey del Ring Championship complete with a belt to symbolize the championship that would be awarded to the winner each year. At that point in time the Rey del Ring title became a championship that could be defended and lost or won in matches in between the annual tournaments. For the tournament the champion would vacate the Rey del Ring Championship prior to the actual Rey del Ring match itself. All Rey del Ring shows, as well as the majority of the IWRG shows in general are held in "Arena Naucalpan", owned by the promoters of IWRG and their main arena. The 2012 Rey del Ring was the tenth over all Rey del Ring tournament held by IWRG.

=== Storylines ===
The event featured three professional wrestling matches with different wrestlers involved in pre-existing scripted feuds, plots and storylines. Wrestlers were portrayed as either heels (referred to as rudos in Mexico, those that portray the "bad guys") or faces (técnicos in Mexico, the "good guy" characters) as they followed a series of tension-building events, which culminated in a wrestling match or series of matches.

== Results ==
No.	Results	Stipulations
1^{D}	Charly Madrid and Serpiente de Oro defeated Matrix, Jr. and The Mummy – two falls to one	Tag team best two-out-of-three falls tag team match
2^{D}	Centvrión, Chicano and Pantera defeated Avisman, Damian 666 and El Hijo del Diablo – two falls to one	Best two-out-of-three falls six-man tag team match
3	Factor won the 2012 Rey del Ring tournament Also in the match: Oficial 911, Oficial AK-47, Alan Extreme, Bestia 666, Carta Brava, Jr., CIMA, Dinamic Black, Douki, Dr. Cerebro, Eita, Eterno, Oficial Fierro, Freelance, Freeyser, Golden Magic, Headhunter I, Hijo de Pirata Morgan, Imposible, Mike Segura, Multifacético, Pete Powers, Pirata Morgan, Rayan, Shadow Phoenix, Spartan, Tony Rivera, Trauma II, Veneno and X-Fly	2012 IWRG Rey del Ring, 30-man elimination match
D / – this was a dark match

== 2012 Rey del Ring entrants and eliminations ==
Key

Symbol	Meaning
$	Tournament wunner

Draw	Entrant	Order	Eliminated by	Time	Eliminations
1	Spartan				
2	Imposible				
3	Dinamic Black				
4	Carta Brava, Jr.				
5	Douki				
6	Freeyser				
7	Alan Extreme				
8	Oficial Fierro				
9	Pete Powers				
10	Mike Segura				
11	Tony Rivera				
12	Freelance				
13	Shadow Phoenix				
14	Multifacético				
15	Dr. Cerebro				
16	Rayan				
17	Golden Magic				
18	Veneno				
19	Eterno				
20	Trauma II				
21	Eita				
22	Pirata Morgan				
23	Bestia 666				
24	Headhunter A				
25	Oficial AK-47				
26	CIMA				
27	Factor$	N/A	Winner		Hijo de Pirata Morgan,
28	Hijo de Pirata Morgan	29	Factor		
29	X-Fly				
30	Oficial 911				
