= Shun Skywalker =

Japanese professional wrestler (born 1996)

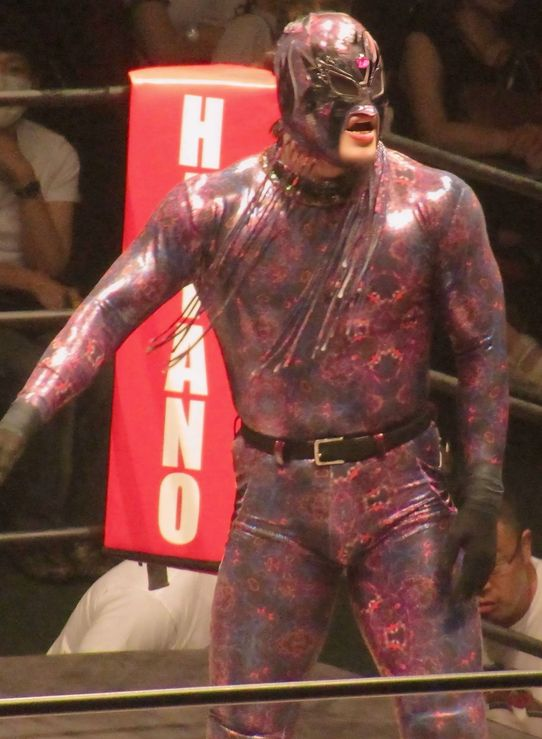
- Skywalker in July 2024

Personal information
- Born: Shun Watanabe; May 30, 1996 (age 30) Toki, Gifu, Japan

Professional wrestling career
- Ring names: Shun Watanabe; Shun Skywalker
- Billed height: 1.83 m (6 ft 0 in)
- Billed weight: 90 kg (200 lb)
- Trained by: Dragon Gate Dojo; Masaaki Mochizuki
- Debut: April 22, 2016

Shun Watanabe (渡辺俊, Watanabe Shun) (born May 30, 1996), known by the ring name Shun Skywalker (シュン・スカイウォーカー, Shun Sukaiwōkā), is a Japanese luchador enmascarado (or masked professional wrestler). He is signed to New Japan Pro-Wrestling (NJPW), where he is a member of House of Torture and a former NJPW World Television Champion. He is best known for his ten-year tenure with Dragongate.

Watanabe is also best known for his work in international promotions such as International Wrestling Revolution Group (IRWG), Lucha Libre AAA Worldwide (AAA), Toryumon Mexico and Major League Wrestling (MLW). He has also made appearances for All Japan Pro Wrestling (AJPW), Pro-Wrestling Noah (NOAH).

== Professional wrestling career ==
=== Dragon Gate (2016–2026) ===
==== Early career (2016–2019) ====
On September 24, 2018, at Dangerous Gate 2018, Skywalker received his first title shot when he teamed up with Masaaki Mochizuki and faced Tribe Vanguard (Yamato and BxB Hulk) for the Open the Twin Gate Championship, where they lost the match.

==== Masquerade (2020–2022) ====
On November 3, at Gate of Destiny, Skywalker returned to Dragon Gate from his excursion, and challenged Eita for the Open The Dream Gate Championship. On November 15, at Kobe Puroresu Festival 2020, he defeated Eita to win the title. On December 2, alongside Ben-K's former stablemates from Dragon Gate Generation, Dragon Dia, Jason Lee and Kota Minoura, Skywalker announced the creation of their own stable, which would be joined by a mysterious member on December 15. On that date, the stable was named Masquerade and that their new member was announced as La Estrella. Five days later, at Final Gate 2020, Skywalker successfully retained his Open the Dream Gate title against Ben-K.

On March 7, 2021, at Champion Gate 2021 In Osaka - Tag 2, Skywalker retained his title against Kaito Ishida. Twenty days later, at Memorial Gate in Wakayama, he retained his title against Kazma Sakamoto. On August 1, at Speed Star Final 2021, Skywalker lost the Open the Dream Gate title to Yamato. On December 15, Skywalker, Jason Lee and Kota Minoura defeated R.E.D. (Eita, H.Y.O and Kaito Ishida) to win the Open the Triangle Gate Championship and after the match Minoura challenged Skywalker to a match where if he lost, he would have to leave the stable. On December 26, at Final Gate 2021, H.Y.O and SB Kento of R.E.D tried to help Skywalker during his match against Kota Minoura by throwing a chair at him, while the referee was down, but he refused their help. Shortly after, he removed his mask and sent it into Minoura's hands while the referee was not looking. After the referee turned around and saw Minoura holding Skywalker's mask, he awarded Skywalker the victory by disqualification.

==== R.E.D. and Z-Brats (2022–2026) ====
On January 12, 2022, Skywalker, Lee, Minoura lost the Open the Triangle Gate Championship against R.E.D. (Eita, H.Y.O and Kaito Ishida). During the match, Minoura accidentally hit him, after trying to protect himself from H.Y.O. After the match H.Y.O invited Skywalker to join R.E.D, which he accepted. However, Eita and Ishida were against his addition and Eita tried to expel H.Y.O, leading the rest of the group to turn against them and Skywalker to become the newest member of R.E.D. On February 4, the group was rebranded as Z-Brats in order to distance themselves from the concept of R.E.D. created by Eita.

On February 20, Skywalker, BxB Hulk and H.Y.O participated in a tournament to crown the new Open the Triangle Gate Champions. At the tournament, they defeated Riki Iihashi, Ishin Iihashi and Takuma Fujiwara in the semi-finals, before losing to Natural Vibes (Kzy, Jacky "Funky" Kamei and Yuta Tanaka) in the final. On March 23, Skywalker, H.Y.O and SB KENTo made their Pro Wrestling Noah debut by attacking Alejandro, Daisuke Harada and Junta Miyawaki, before challenging them to a match at the Majestic event which took place on April 29. On May 5, at Dead or Alive 2022, Skywalker won the with Open the Twin Gate Championship with new stablemate and Diamante, defeating Dragon Dia and Yuki Yoshioka. On July 30, they lost their titles to Kung Fu Masters (Jason Lee and Jacky "Funky" Kamei).

On November 6, at Gate of Destiny, Skywalker teamed up with, Kai and ISHIN and defeated M3K (Masaaki Mochizuki, Susumu Mochizuki and Mochizuki Junior) to win the Open the Triangle Gate Championship. On January 11, 2023, he became a double champion when he defeated Yuki Yoshioka to win his second Open the Dream Gate Championship. On March 3, 2024, Ishin, Kai and Skywalker, defeated D'courage (Dragon Dia, Madoka Kikuta and Ryoya Tanaka) to win the vacant Open the Triangle Gate titles.

On June 4, 2026 at Rainbow Gate: Night 1, Shun confirmed that he would be leaving Dragongate to "ascend to the heavens". His Dragongate departure match was confirmed for the August 4 Korakuen event, where he'd take on Homare, who is the protege of Shun. On August 4, Shun defeated Homare in Shun's final match, and left Dragongate effective immediately.

=== Excursion in Mexico (2019–2020) ===
From June 14 to August 30, 2020, Skywalker competed in IWRG's Rey del Ring, defeating El Hijo de Canis Lupus in the final to win the tournament. This earned him the right to face Demonio Infernal for the IWRG Rey del Ring Championship on September 6, losing to the latter.

=== Major League Wrestling (2022) ===
On September 18, 2022 at Super Series, Skywalker defeated Myron Reed to win the MLW World Middleweight Championship. On October 30, at Fightland, he lost the title to Lince Dorado.

=== New Japan Pro-Wrestling (2026–present) ===
On the final night of the G1 Climax on August 15, 2026, Skywalker made his New Japan Pro-Wrestling (NJPW) debut as the newest member of House of Torture and attacked the NJPW World Television Champion Konosuke Takeshita. On September 27 at Destruction in Kobe, Skywalker defeated Takeshita to win the NJPW World Television Championship, marking his first title in NJPW.

== Championships and accomplishments ==
- Dragongate
  - Open the Dream Gate Championship (3 time)
  - Open the Twin Gate Championship (1 time) – with Diamante
  - Open the Triangle Gate Championship (4 times) – with Kota Minoura and Jason Lee (1) and Kai and Ishin (2), Gianni Valletta and Homare (1)
  - Rey de Parejas (2025) – with Homare
  - Rookie Ranking Tournament (2019)
  - Rookie of the Year (2018)
- International Wrestling Revolution Group
  - Rey del Ring (2020)
- Major League Wrestling
  - MLW World Middleweight Championship (1 time)
- New Japan Pro-Wrestling
  - NJPW World Television Championship (1 time)
- Pro Wrestling Illustrated
  - Ranked No. 33 of the top 500 singles wrestlers in the PWI 500 in 2023
