= Guerra de Familias (2012) =

2012 International Wrestling Revolution Group event

- Official poster for the show
- Promotion(s): International Wrestling Revolution Group; Promociones Wagner
- Date: April 8, 2012
- City: Naucalpan, State of Mexico
- Venue: Arena Naucalpan

Event chronology
← Previous; Rebelión de los Juniors	Next → Guerra del Golfo

IWRG Guerra de Familias chronology
← Previous; First	Next → 2013

The 2012 Guerra de Familias (Spanish for "War of the Families") was a major lucha libre event produced and scripted by the Mexican International Wrestling Revolution Group (IWRG) professional wrestling promotion in conjunction with Promocione Wagner on April 8, 2012. The show was held in Arena Naucalpan, Naucalpan, State of Mexico, which is IWRG's primary venue. The show was the first show promoted under the Guerra de Familias, with IWRG holding subsequent shows in later years.

IWRG joined up with the Dr. Wagner Jr.-owned Promociones Wagner for the show with all the main event competitors either being from the Wagner family or booked through Promociones Wagner. Dr. Wagner Jr. teamed up with his son El Hijo de Dr. Wagner Jr., his brother Silver King teaming up with Silver King Jr., and AAA wrestler La Parka teaming up with his brother for the third team in the steel cage match. The Wagners won the match when El Hijo de Dr. Wagner Jr. escaped the cage, leaving Silver King Jr. alone in the ring. The show featured four additional matches and included wrestlers from IWRG, AAA as well as wrestlers who work primarily on the Mexican independent circuit.

== Production ==
=== Background ===
professional wrestling has been a generational tradition in Lucha libre since its inception early in the 20th century, with many second- and third-generation wrestlers following in their parents' footsteps. Several lucha libre promotions honor those traditions, often with annual tournaments such as Consejo Mundial de Lucha Libre's La Copa Junior. In addition to actual second- and third-generation wrestlers, lucha libre also has a number of wrestlers who are presented as second- and third-generation wrestlers by the promoters without actually being a second- or third-generation wrestler. These are normally masked wrestlers promoted as "Juniors", on a few occasions billed as "El Hijo de" (literally "The Son of") These wrestlers normally pay a royalty or fee for the use of the name, using the name of an established star to get attention from fans and promoters. Examples of such instances of fictional family relationships include Arturo Beristain, also known as El Hijo del Gladiador ("The Son of El Gladiador), who was not related to the original El Gladiador, or El Hijo de Cien Caras who paid Cien Caras for the rights to use the name.

Over the years, the Mexican International Wrestling Revolution Group (IWRG) has held various tournaments and shows to celebrate the role of family in lucha libre and even created a championship, the IWRG Junior de Juniors Championship, specifically for second- and third-generation wrestlers. IWRG also holds an annual Rebelión de los Juniors ("The Junior Rebellion") show each year to tie in with the Junior de Juniors Championship. In 2011 IWRG also introduced the IWRG Legado Final ("Final Legacy") show with a father/son tag team tournament main event.

In 2012 IWRG held their first ever Guerra de Familias ("War of the Families"), working with Dr. Wagner Jr.'s Promocione Wagner to bring together wrestlers from IWRG, AAA and wrestlers who worked on the Mexican independent circuit, but not for IWRG on a regular basis.

=== Storylines ===
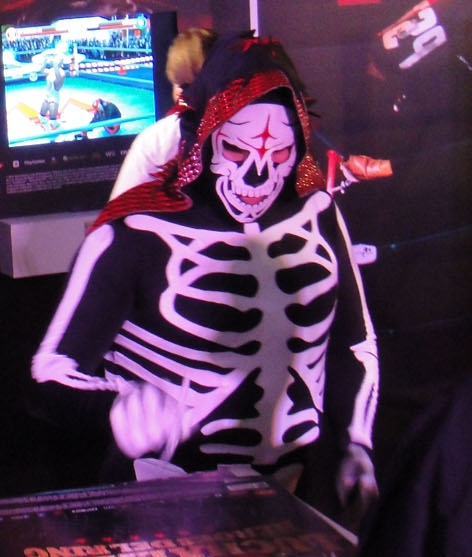
La Parka, who teamed up with his brother Taboo for the main event.

The event featured five professional wrestling matches, with different wrestlers involved in pre-existing scripted feuds, plots and storylines. Wrestlers were portrayed as either heels (referred to as rudos in Mexico, those that portray the "bad guys") or faces (técnicos in Mexico, the "good guy" characters) as they followed a series of tension-building events, which culminated in a wrestling match or series of matches.

Brothers Dr. Wagner Jr. and Silver King, sons of Dr. Wagner, have often worked together as a tag team, or at times even feuding with each other as various promotions pitted the two brothers against each other. In 2009 Dr. Wagner Jr. introduced the wrestling world to El Hijo de Dr. Wagner Jr. (Literally "The Son of Dr. Wagner Jr."), as a third-generation of Wagners began wrestling. In early 2012 Silver King introduced "Silver King Jr.", supposedly his son.

== Event ==
The main event of the show, a three-team steel cage match was contested under "Escape" rules, which meant that wrestlers would win the match by exiting the cage, with the last wrestler, or team left in the cage being declared the losers of the match. For the first ten minutes of the match the wrestlers were not allowed to leave the cage, instead they fought to wear down their opponents to allow an easier exit later on. During the early portions of the match Silver King Jr. dove off the top of the 20 foot cage onto the five wrestlers in the ring. He would later be the first wrestler to climb over the top and escape the match. During the match Taboo attacked his own brother, La Parka and then climbed out of the cage, leaving La Parka to fend for himself. After that both Dr. Wagner Jr. and La Parka climbed out, leaving Silver King and El Hijo de Dr. Wagner Jr. as the last two competitors in the cage. Near the closing moments of the match Silver King's associates Pete Powers, Taya Valkyrie and the Mummy came to the ring to help him. This brought both Dr. Wagner Jr. and La Parka back to the ring to chase them off. In the end El Hijo de Dr. Wagner Jr. managed to climb out of the cage, leaving Silver King as the loser of the match.

== Aftermath ==
In late 2014 Silver King announced that the wrestler known as "Silver King Jr." was in fact not his son, and distanced himself from the character. In lucha libre there are numerous instances of a wrestler buying or leasing the name of a famous wrestler to work as a "Junior" without actually being the son of said wrestler, for instance neither El Hijo de Cien Caras nor Cien Caras Jr. are related to the original Cien Caras. Silver King later introduced "El Hijo de Silver King", who is believed to legitimately be the son of Silver King and not a storyline.

IWRG held another Guerra de Familias show in 2013, with a tag team tournament as the focal point, won by Los Junior Dinamitas (Cien Caras Jr. and Hijo de Máscara Año 2000).

== Results ==
No.	Results	Stipulations	Times
1	Chicano and Miss Gaviota defeated Charly Madrid and The Mummy	Best two-out-of-three-falls tag team match	15:02
2	La Chiva, Ludark Shaitan and Máscarita Divina defeated Mini Charly Manson, Sexy Lady and Tiger Lee	Lumberjack match	12:55
3	Los Oficiales (Oficial 911, Oficial AK-47 and Oficial Fierro) defeated Aero Star, Argenis and Drago	Best two-out-of-three falls six-man tag team match	22:18
4	Faby Apache and La Dinastia de la Muerte (Negro Navarro and Trauma II defeated Gran Apache, Mary Apache and Trauma I	Relevos Increibles six-man tag team match	16:06
5	Silver King and Silver King Jr. lost to Dr. Wagner Jr. and El Hijo de Dr. Wagner Jr. Also in the match:La Parka and Taboo	Three tag team steel cage match	29:54

Steel cage order of elimination

1. Silver King Jr.
2. Taboo
3. Dr. Wagner Jr.
4. La Parka
5. El Hijo de Dr. Wagner Jr.
