= IWRG Guerra de Familias =

International Wrestling Revolution Group event series

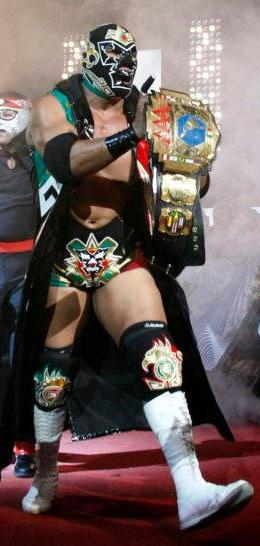
Dr. Wagner Jr., who helped co-promote the first Guerra de Familias show in 2012.

The Guerra de Familias (Spanish for "War of the Families") is a major professional wrestling show held by the Mexican Lucha Libre promotion International Wrestling Revolution Group (IWRG) intermittently starting in 2012. The show honors the fact that Lucha Libre is a family tradition by holding a tournament where all teams are supposedly made up of family members. All shows have been held in Arena Naucalpan in Naucalpan, Mexico State, IWRG's main venue. IWRG has held a Guerra de Familias show in 2012, 2013 and 2015, with no show announced for 2016 yet.

== Event history ==
Mexican Lucha libre, or professional wrestling, has a long history of being a family tradition with brothers, sons, daughters, grandchildren etc. following in the footsteps of their relatives and also become luchadors (wrestlers). The professional wrestling promotion International Wrestling Revolution Group (IWRG; Sometimes referred to as Grupo Internacional Revolución in Spanish) honors the traditions of family in lucha libre as part of their annual shows, including Rebelión de los Juniors, a show which focuses on second or third-generation wrestlers. The also promote a IWRG Legado Final ("Final Legacy") show that also focuses on generations teaming up for a tournament as well as the IWRG Junior de Juniors Championship where the challengers and champions must be a second-generation wrestler in one form or another. Starting in 2012 IWRG has also held shows billed as Guerra de Familias ("War of the Families"), a show featuring a tag team tournament featuring family members teaming up for a one night tournament. IWRG offers no tangible prize to the winner other than the honor of winning the tournament. The first Guerra de Familias show was a combined effort of IWRG and Promocciones Wagner and featured a steel cage match format instead of an elimination tournament. In 2013 and 2015 the format was a one night, 8 team tag team tournament.

Over the years the definition of "Family" has been at times stretched thin, beyond blood relatives IWRG has also included storyline, or Kayfabe, family relationships such as Cien Caras, Jr., who portray a character that is supposed to be the son of Cien Caras, but in real life Cien Caras Jr. paid for the use of the name. On occasion IWRG included a team that never purported to be blood relations but long time tag team partners instead; Oficial 911 and Oficial AK-47 as well as Eterno and Mosco X-Fly. For the 2015 show IWRG was forced to substitute Pirata Morgan Jr. with Canis Lupus at the last minute, they also never officially explained the family relationship between the team of El Hijo de Dos Caras with Súper Nova but it is possible they are related in some way. 29 wrestlers have participated in the three Guerra de Familias tournaments held so far, with Danny Casas, Hijo de Máscara Año 2000 and Trauma I being the only wrestlers to have competed in more than one tournament. The most recent show, the 2015 Guerra de Familias show was held on July 5, 2015, with no show announced for 2016 yet.

== Guerra de Familas tournament winners ==
Year	Winner(s)	Loser(s)	Reference
2012	Dr. Wagner Jr. and El Hijo de Dr. Wagner Jr.	La Parka/Taboo and Silver King/Silver King Jr.	
2013	Los Junior Dinamitas (Cien Caras, Jr. and Hijo de Máscara Año 2000)	Las Traumas (Trauma I and Trauma II)	
2015	Los Crazy Americans (Coloso Chris and Príncipe Orión)	Danny Casas and Veneno	

== Dates, venues, and main events ==
Event	Date	City	Venue	Main event
2012	April 8, 2012	Naucalpan, Mexico State	Arena Naucalpan	Dr. Wagner Jr. and El Hijo de Dr. Wagner Jr. vs. La Parka and Taboo vs. Silver King and Silver King Jr.
2013	March 31, 2013	Naucalpan, Mexico State	Arena Naucalpan	Los Junior Dinamitas (Cien Caras, Jr. and Hijo de Máscara Año 2000) vs. Las Traumas (Trauma I and Trauma II)
2015	July 5, 2015	Naucalpan, Mexico State	Arena Naucalpan	Los Crazy Americans (Coloso Chris and Príncipe Orión) vs. Danny Casas and Veneno
