= Prisión Fatal (January 2017) =

2017 International Wrestling Revolution Group event

Prisión Fatal (2017) IWRG 21st Anniversary Show
- Official poster for the event showing the four men in the cage match
- Promotion: International Wrestling Revolution Group
- Date: January 1, 2017
- City: Naucalpan, State of Mexico
- Venue: Arena Naucalpan

Event chronology
← Previous; Arena Naucalpan 39th Anniversary Show	Next → Máscara vs. Cabellera

IWRG Prisión Fatal IWRG Anniversary Shows chronology
← Previous; Prisión Fatal; IWRG 20th Anniversary Show	Next → IWRG 22nd Anniversary Show

Prisión Fatal (2017) was a professional wrestling major event, scripted and produced by the Mexico based International Wrestling Revolution Group (IWRG) professional wrestling promotion. The event took on January 1, 2017, at "Arena Naucalpan" in Naucalpan, State of Mexico, IWRG's main venue. The show was also the IWRG 21st Anniversary Show, marking the creation of IWRG on January 1, 1996. It was the seventh time IWRG held a Prisión Fatal event, all of which featured the eponymous Prisión Fatal (Spanish for "Deadly Prison") Steel cage match as the main event. In the Prisión Fatal match the last person remaining in the cage is forced to unmasked as per the match stipulation.

For this version of the Prisión Fatal steel cage match IWRG booked Golden Magic, Imposible, Pirata Morgan Jr. and Relámpago, who all risked their wrestling mask. During the match both Golden Magic and Relámpago escaped the cage, leading to Imposible pinning Pirata Morgan Jr. to win the match. Afterward, Pirata Morgan Jr. unmasked and revealed that his real name was Pedro Ortiz Soto, 35 years old at the time and that he had been a professional wrestler for 15 years. The show featured four additional matches

== Production ==
=== Background ===
In the 1960s, wrestler Adolfo "Pirata" Moreno began promoting wrestling shows in his native Naucalpan, State of Mexico, Mexico, bringing in wrestlers from Empresa Mexicana de Lucha Libre (EMLL) to Naucalpan to work shows with local wrestlers from the Mexican independent circuit. Initially he ran sporadic shows, but later on began promoting regular shows at "Arena KO Al Gusto". In the 1970s he served as the local Universal Wrestling Association (UWA) promoter under the name Promociones Moreno efforts. In 1977 Moreno bought Arena KO Al Gusto instead of renting it. After buying the old arena it was demolished to make way for a new arena, Arena Naucalpan, an arena designed specifically for wrestling shows, with a maximum capacity of 2,400 spectators. Arena Naucalpan became the permanent home for Promociones Moreno.

In late 1995 Adolfo Moreno decided to create his own promotion, using a regular core roster supplemented with wrestlers from Consejo Mundial de Lucha Libre (CMLL, formerly EMLL), creating the International Wrestling Revolution Group (IWRG; sometimes referred to as Grupo Internacional Revolución in Spanish) on January 1, 1996. From that point on Arena Naucalpan became the main venue for IWRG, hosting the majority of their weekly shows and all of their major shows as well. The first IWRG Anniversary Show was held on January 1, 1997 with all subsequent shows being held on or right after January 1 each year, all at Arena Naucalpan. Posters for the January 1 show mistakenly lists it as the 20th anniversary show, but also bills it as a Prisión Fatal ("Deadly Prison") show.

Starting as far back as at least 2000, the Mexican wrestling promotion International Wrestling Revolution Group (IWRG; Sometimes referred to as Grupo Internacional Revolución in Spanish) has held several annual events where the main event was a multi-man steel cage match where the last wrestler left in the cage would be forced to either remove their wrestling mask or have their hair shaved off under Lucha de Apuestas, or "bet match", rules. From 2012 IWRG has promoted a variation of the steel cage match under the moniker Prisión Fatal at least once a year since its inception. The Prisión Fatal has the added twist that each competitor is chained by the wrist to the cage with a long steel chain and to escape they fight have to get a key to unlock their chain before they are able to escape. The added chain helps to distinguish it from other Steel cage matches held throughout the year such as the IWRG Guerra del Golfo ("Gulf War"), IWRG Guerra de Sexos ("War of the Sexes") or IWRG El Castillo del Terror ("The Tower of Terror") shows. The Prisión Fatal shows, as well as the majority of the IWRG shows in general, are held in "Arena Naucalpan", owned by the promoters of IWRG and their main arena. The 2017 Prisión Fatal show was the seventh time that IWRG promoted a show under that name and the third time the loser would unmask as a result.

=== Storylines ===
The Prisión Fatal event featured five professional wrestling matches with different wrestlers involved in pre-existing scripted feuds, plots and storylines. Wrestlers were portrayed as either heels (referred to as rudos in Mexico, those that portray the "bad guys") or faces (técnicos in Mexico, the "good guy" characters) as they followed a series of tension-building events, which culminated in a wrestling match or series of matches.

== Event ==
For the main event of the show, Golden Magic, Imposible, Pirata Morgan Jr. and Relámpago all had individual chains tied to their wrist, secured with a padlock. The chains were long enough to allow the wrestlers to move around the cage, but not long enough to allow them to escape. The first three wrestlers who managed to climb up a ladder and get a key could unlock their change and climb out. During the first portions of the match Relámpago and Impossible focused on each other, while Pirata Morgan Jr. and Golden Magic fought each other, pairing up based on the storyline feuds that had led up to the cage match. Golden Magic was the first wrestler to escape the cage, followed by Relámpago. In the closing moments of the match, it looked like Pirata Morgan Jr. would escape the match, but as he climbed the cage Golden Magic returned to the arena and his rival over the head with a steel chair. Moments later Relámpago tried to prevent Imposible to escape, but Golden Magic prevented it, allowing Imposible to climb out of the cage.

After the match was finished Pirata Morgan Jr. stood in the middle of the ring, removing his torn, blood-soaked mask and announced that his real name was Pedro Ortiz Soto, legitimately the son of Pirata Morgan (Pedro Ortiz Villanueva). Then stated that he was 35 years old and had been a luchador for 15 years.

== Results ==
No.	Results	Stipulations
1	Black Dragón and Cadillac defeated Adrenalina and Keshin Black	Best two-out-of-three-falls tag team match
2	Araña de Plata and Demonio Infernal defeated Alfa and Omega	Best two-out-of-three-falls tag team match
3	Dr. Cerebro and Los Oficiales (Oficial AK47 and Oficial Fierro) defeated Danny Casas, Dragón Fly and Veneno	Best two-out-of-three falls six-man tag team match
4	Máscara Año 2000 Jr., Mr. Electro and Tinieblas Jr. defeated The Killer Jr., Negro Navarro and Pirata Morgan	Best two-out-of-three falls six-man tag team match
5	Imposible defeated Pirata Morgan Jr. (Also in the cage: Golden Magic and Relámpago)	Prisión Fatal Steel cage match
