= Rey del Ring (2015) =

2015 International Wrestling Revolution Group event

- Official poster for the show.
- Promotion: International Wrestling Revolution Group
- Date: April 5, 2015
- City: Naucalpan, State of Mexico
- Venue: Arena Naucalpan

Event chronology
← Previous; Guerra del Golfo	Next → Ruleta de la Muerte

IWRG Rey del Ring chronology
← Previous; 2014	Next → 2016

The Rey del Ring (2015) show (Spanish for "King of the Ring") was an annual professional wrestling major event produced by Mexican professional wrestling promotion International Wrestling Revolution Group (IWRG), and took place on April 5, 2015, in Arena Naucalpan, Naucalpan, State of Mexico, Mexico. The main event was the Eponymous IWRG Rey del Ring tournament, the thirteenth annual version of the tournament, which is IWRG's version of WWE's Royal Rumble event.

== Production ==
=== Background ===
The Mexican professional wrestling company International Wrestling Revolution Group (IWRG; at times referred to as Grupo Internacional Revolución in Mexico) started their annual Rey del Ring ("King of the Ring") event in 2002, creating an annual event around the eponymous Rey del Ring match, a 30-man elimination match similar in concept to the WWE's Royal Rumble match. From 2002 until the 2011 event the "prize" for winning the match itself was simply the prestige of outlasting 29 other competitors, but at the 2011 Rey del Ring IWRG introduced the IWR Rey del Ring Championship complete with a belt to symbolize the championship that would be awarded to the winner each year. At that point in time the Rey del Ring title became a championship that could be defended and lost or won in matches in between the annual tournaments. For the tournament the champion would vacate the Rey del Ring Championship prior to the actual Rey del Ring match itself. All Rey del Ring shows, as well as the majority of the IWRG shows in general are held in Arena Naucalpan, owned by the promoters of IWRG and their main arena. The 2015 Rey del Ring was the thirteenth over all Rey del Ring tournament held by IWRG.

=== Storylines ===
The event featured three professional wrestling matches with different wrestlers involved in pre-existing scripted feuds, plots and storylines. Wrestlers were portrayed as either heels (referred to as rudos in Mexico, those that portray the "bad guys") or faces (técnicos in Mexico, the "good guy" characters) as they followed a series of tension-building events, which culminated in a wrestling match or series of matches.

== Results ==
No.	Results	Stipulations
1	Hip Hop Man defeated Dragón Celestial (c)	Singles match for the AIWA Cruiserweight Championship
2	Los Tortugas Ninjas (Leo, Mike, Rafy and Teelo) defeated Electro Boy and Los Gringos VIP (Apolo Estrada Jr., Avisman and El Hijo del Diablo)	Best two-out-of-three falls six-man "Lucha Libre rules" tag team match
3	Ricky Cruz won the 2015 Rey del Ring; Also in the match: 911, AK-47, Apolo Estrada Jr., Astro Rey Jr., Black Terry, Cerebro Negro, Chicano, Danny Casas, Emperador Azteca, Eterno, Golden Magic, El Hijo del Alebrije, El Hijo de Dos Caras, El Hijo de Fishman, Hijo del Máscara Año 2000, El Hijo del Máscara Sagrada, Liderk, Máscara Sagrada, Metaleon, Pantera, Rafy, Rayan, Relámpago, Spartan, Tony Rivera, Universo 2000 Jr., Veneno, X-Fly and Yakuza	2014 IWRG Rey del Ring, 30-man elimination match
(c) / – the champion(s) heading into the match
