= Rey del Ring (2008) =

2008 International Wrestling Revolution Group event

- Promotion: International Wrestling Revolution Group
- Date: July 24, 2008
- City: Naucalpan, State of Mexico
- Venue: Arena Naucalpan

Event chronology
← Previous; Guerra del Golfo	Next → Festival de las Máscaras

Rey del Ring chronology
← Previous; 2007	Next → 2009

The 2008 Rey del Ring (Spanish for "King of the Ring") was a major lucha libre event produced and scripted by the Mexican International Wrestling Revolution Group (IWRG) professional wrestling promotion on July 24, 2008. The show was held in Arena Naucalpan, Naucalpan, State of Mexico, which is IWRG's primary venue. The show was the seventh overall IWRG Rey del Ring show held, with the first being held in 2002.

The focal point of the show was the eponymous Rey del Ring tournament, a 30-man elimination match similar in concept to the WWE's Royal Rumble match. The match was won by Scorpio Jr. when he eliminated El Hijo de Cien Caras to win the tournament. Scorpio Jr. was also the person to eliminate the most wrestlers, a total of six, including El Hijo de Cien Caras, Ciclon Negro, Fuerza Guerrera, Oficial AK-47, Capitain Muerte and Tinieblas Jr. The Rey del Ring match was the only verified match on the show, although it is possible there were preliminary matches.

== Production ==
=== Background ===
The Mexican professional wrestling company International Wrestling Revolution Group (IWRG; at times referred to as Grupo Internacional Revolución in Mexico) started to hold their annual Rey del Ring ("King of the Ring") tournament on J 2002, creating an annual event around the eponymous Rey del Ring match, a 30-man elimination match similar in concept to the WWE's Royal Rumble match. From 2002 through 2007 the Rey del Ring match started with four wrestlers in the ring, only adding another wrestler when someone was pinned, forced to submit, was disqualified or counted out, which meant that no more than four wrestlers would be in the ring at the same time. Unlike the Royal Rumble the Rey del Ring rules allowed wrestlers to be eliminated by pinfall etc., not by being thrown over the top rope to the floor as regular battle royal rules describe. From 2002 through 2010 the Rey del Ring winner did not get any specific prize for winning the match, except for the 2004 Rey del Ring tournament where the winner also won the vacant IWRG Intercontinental Middleweight Championship. Fantasy won the Rey del Ring as well as the IWRG Intercontinental Middleweight Championship. For the 2008 Rey del Ring tournament IWRG adjusted the rules a little, instead of four wrestlers starting in the ring and someone being added only upon elimination, two wrestlers would start out and at timed intervals, two minutes in this case, another wrestler would enter the ring to join the match.

=== Storylines ===
The event featured only one professional wrestling matches with different wrestlers involved in pre-existing scripted feuds, plots and storylines. Wrestlers were portrayed as either heels (referred to as rudos in Mexico, those that portray the "bad guys") or faces (técnicos in Mexico, the "good guy" characters) as they followed a series of tension-building events, which culminated in a wrestling match or series of matches.

With 30 competitors in the Rey del Ring match, the event saw the convergence of multiple individual storylines and feuds, including a long-running three-way storyline feud between Black Terry, Fuerza Guerrera and Multifacético. The feud had begun in early 2008 when Multifacético challenged the veteran Black Terry for the IWRG Intercontinental Welterweight Championship, the storyline was that Black Terry was offended by the challenge because Multifacético had not "earned" his spot yet, being a young wrestler with limited experience. On March 23, 2008, Multifacético defeated Black Terry to win the Welterweight Championship. At that point the veteran rudo Fuerza Guerrera joined the storyline, attacking Multifacético after his championship victory. The following month Multifacético defeated Black Terry in a Lucha de Apuestas, or "Bet match", forcing Black Terry to have all his hair shaved off as a result. At the 2008 Caravana de Campeones show, on May 29, Fuerza Guerrera won the IWRG Intercontinental Welterweight Championship as Black Terry helped him defeat Multifacético. 11 days before the Rey del Ring Fuerza Guerrera successfully defended the championship against Black Terry, which meant he entered the Rey del Ring as the champion.

== Event ==
The 30-man main event competitors were: Aeroman, Arlequin, Capitan Muerte, Cerebro Negro, Chico Che, Ciclon Negro, Cocolores, Dr. Cerebro, El Hijo del Cien Caras, El Hijo del Pierroth, El Hijo del Solitario, Fantasma de la Opera, Fenix, Freelance, Fuerza Guerrera, Gemelo Fantastico I, Gemelo Fantastico II, Goleador, Karloff Lagarde Jr., Multifacetico, Oficial 911, Oficial AK-47, Oficial Fierro, Scorpio Jr., Star Boy, Tinieblas Jr., Trauma II, Ultraman Jr., Xibalba and Zumbido. Scorpio Jr. won the match when he pinned El Hijo del Cien Caras after all the other competitors had already been eliminated. While winning the match Scorpio Jr. also eliminated the most wrestlers during the match, six in total, as he defeated not only El Hijo de Cien Caras but also Ciclon Negro, Oficial AK-47, Capitan Muerte, Fuerza Guerrera and Tinieblas Jr.

== Aftermath ==
The 2009 Rey del Ring tournament was held under the same rules and with no specific prize, but in 2011 IWRG introduced an actual "IWRG Rey del Ring Championship" that would be awarded to the winner of the tournament. The championship could then be defended in regular matches between the annual tournaments but would always be on the line in the Rey del Ring tournament. The 2011 tournament and the championship was won by Pantera.

The 2009 Rey del Ring was won by Puerto Rican wrestler Ricky Cruzz, who would later team up with Scorpio Jr., the 2008 Rey del Ring winner, to form a regular tag team. On August 9, 2011, Scorpio And Cruzz defeated Los Junior Dinamitas ("The Junior Dynamites"; El Hijo de Cien Caras and Máscara Año 2000 Jr.) to win the IWRG Intercontinental Tag Team Championship.

The ongoing three-way storyline between Black Terry, Fuerza Guerrera and Multifacético continued after the Rey del Ring show and saw Black Terry defeat Fuerza Guerrera in a match that also included Multifacético. Fuerza Guerrera would regain the championship and then turn his attention to other storylines in IWRG while Black Terry and Multifacético continued their feud. In early 2009 Multifacético left IWRG and began working for Consejo Mundial de Lucha Libre (CMLL) under the name "Guerrero Maya Jr." ("Mayan Warrior Jr."). At that point it was confirmed that Multifacético was, in fact, the son of Black Terry, as Black Terry had worked as "Guerrero Maya" at one point in his career.

== Results ==
No.	Results	Stipulations
1	Scorpio Jr. won the Rey del Ring	2008 IWRG Rey del Ring 30-man tournament

=== Rey del Ring entrances and eliminations ===
A new entrant came out approximately every two minutes.

Draw	Entrant	Order	Eliminated by
1	Cocolores	3	Ciclon Negro
2	Chico Che	10	Karloff Lagarde Jr.
3	Oficial Fierro	6	Arlequín
4	Xibalba	2	Oficial 911 and Oficial Fierro
5	Fantasma de la Opera	12	El Hijo de Solitario
6	Star Boy	4	Arlequín
7	Oficial 911	5	Freelance
8	Cerebro Negro	8	Fantasma de la Opera
9	Gemelo Fantastico I	1	Cerebro Negro
10	Arlequín	9	Karloff Lagarde Jr.
11	Freelance	7	Cerebro Negro
12	Ciclon Negro	14	Scorpio Jr.
13	Fenix (Note: Not the same Fénix who worked for AAA and Lucha Underground)	11	Fantasma de la Opera
14	Karloff Lagarde Jr.	13	Ciclon Negro
15	Scorpio Jr.	30	Winner
16	El Hijo del Solitario	18	Dr. Cerebro
17	Dr. Cerebro	22	Captain Muerte
18	El Hijo del Pierroth	20	Tinieblas Jr.
19	Aeroman	15	Dr. Cerebro
20	Goleador	16	El Hijo del Pierroth
21	Oficial AK-47	17	Scorpio Jr.
22	Trauma II	19	Tinieblas Jr.
23	Gemelo Fantastico II	21	Tinieblas Jr.
24	Tinieblas Jr.	27	Scorpio Jr.
25	Zumbido	28	El Hijp de Cien Caras
26	Ultraman Jr.	25	Fuerza Guerrera
27	El Hijo del Cien Caras	29	Scorpio Jr.
28	Captain Muerte	23	Scorpio Jr.
29	Multifacético	24	Ultraman Jr.
30	Fuerza Guerrera	26	Scorpio Jr. and Zumbido
