= Guerra de Familias (2015) =

2015 International Wrestling Revolution Group event

- Official poster showing all eight "families" in the tournament
- Promotion: International Wrestling Revolution Group
- Date: July 5, 2015
- City: Naucalpan, State of Mexico
- Venue: Arena Naucalpan

Event chronology
← Previous; Guerra de Escuelas	Next → Legado Final

Guerra de Familias chronology
← Previous; 2013	Next → —

La Guerra de Familias (2015) (Spanish for "War of the Families") was a professional wrestling major event, produced by the Mexico based International Wrestling Revolution Group (IWRG) to promote professional wrestling promotion. The event took on March 31, 2013, at "Arena Naucalpan" in Naucalpan, State of Mexico, IWRG's main venue. The focal point of the event was a four team tag team tournament between four "families".

== Production ==
=== Background ===
The Mexican professional wrestling promotion International Wrestling Revolution Group (IWRG; Sometimes referred to as Grupo Internacional Revolución in Spanish) holds several shows over the year to showcase the fact that wrestling is a family tradition in Lucha libre, with a large number of second and third-generation wrestlers following the footsteps of their relatives and becoming wrestlers themselves. Starting in 2012 IWRG has on several occasions held a Guerra de Familias ("War of the Families") tournament, which is a single-elimination tag team tournament where all teams must be related to each other in some way. IWRG's definition of "Family" included by actual blood relationship and storyline family relationships. For the 2015 Guerra de Titanes IWRG booked Los Oficiales in the tournament despite neither member being related to each other in or out of storylines. They also paired up El Hijo de Dos Caras with Súper Nova and never explained what, if any family relationship existed between the two. The Guerra de Familias shows, as well as the majority of the IWRG shows in general are held in "Arena Naucalpan", owned by the promoters of IWRG and their main arena. The 2015 Guerra de Familias show was the third time that IWRG had held an event under that name.

=== Storylines ===
The event featured ten professional wrestling matches with different wrestlers involved in pre-existing scripted feuds, plots and storylines. Wrestlers were portrayed as either heels (referred to as rudos in Mexico, those that portray the "bad guys") or faces (técnicos in Mexico, the "good guy" characters) as they followed a series of tension-building events, which culminated in a wrestling match or series of matches. IWRG did not put a specific prize up for the winner of the tournament nor promoting it as the winners would receive a match for the IWRG Intercontinental Tag Team Championship.

Guerra de Familias family relationship

Members	Family relationship
Negro Navarro and Trauma I	Father/Son
Canis Lupus and Pirata Morgan	None, Canis Lupus replaced El Hijo de Pirata Morgan
Danny Casas and Veneno	Related through marriage
El Hijo del Pantera and El Pantera	Son/Father
Coloso Chris and Príncipe Orión	Unknown
Oficial 911 and Oficial AK-47)	Not related, regular tag team
El Hijo de Dos Caras and Súper Nova	Unknown
Hijo del Máscara Año 2000 and Universo 2000 Jr.	Cousins

== Results ==
No.	Results	Stipulations
1	Electro Boy and Hip Hop Man defeated Alfa and Omega	Best two-out-of-three falls tag team match
2	Los Tortugas Ninjas (Leo, Mike, Rafy and Teelo) defeated Muerte Infernal, Imposible and Los Terrible Cerebros (Black Terry and Cerebro Negro)	Best two-out-of-three falls Atomicos Lucha Libre rules tag team match
3	Eterno, Halloween Jr. and Apolo Estrada Jr. defeated Emperador Azteca, Golden Magic and La Diva Salvaje	Best two-out-of-three falls six-man "Lucha Libre rules" tag team match
4	La Dinastía de la Muerte (Negro Navarro and Trauma I) defeated Canis Lupus and Pirata Morgan	First round 2015 Guerra de Familias tag team match
5	Danny Casas and Veneno defeated El Hijo del Pantera and El Pantera	First round 2015 Guerra de Familias tag team match
6	Los Crazy Americans (Coloso Chris and Príncipe Orión) defeated Los Oficiales (Oficial 911 and Oficial AK-47)	First round 2015 Guerra de Familias tag team match
7	El Hijo de Dos Caras and Súper Nova defeated Los Primos Dinamitico (Hijo del Máscara Año 2000 and Universo 2000 Jr.)	First round 2015 Guerra de Familias tag team match
8	Danny Casas and El Veneno defeated La Dinastía de la Muerte (Negro Navarro and Trauma #1)	Semi final 2015 Guerra de Familias tag team match
9	Los Crazy Americans (Coloso Chris and Príncipe Orión) defeated El Hijo del Dos Caras and Súper Nova	Semi final 2015 Guerra de Familias tag team match
10	Los Crazy Americans (Coloso Chris and Príncipe Orión) defeated Danny Casas and El Veneno	Final 2015 Guerra de Familias tag team match
