= Rey del Ring (2013) =

2013 International Wrestling Revolution Group event

- Official poster for the show
- Promotion: International Wrestling Revolution Group
- Date: May 19, 2013
- City: Naucalpan, State of Mexico
- Venue: Arena Naucalpan

Event chronology
← Previous; Rebelión de los Juniors	Next → Prisión Fatal

IWRG Rey del Ring chronology
← Previous; 2012	Next → 2014

Rey del Ring (2013) (Spanish for "King of the Ring") was an annual professional wrestling major event produced by Mexican professional wrestling promotion International Wrestling Revolution Group (IWRG), which took place on May 19, 2013 in Arena Naucalpan, Naucalpan, State of Mexico, Mexico. The main event was the Eponymous IWRG Rey del Ring tournament, the eleventh annual version of the tournament, IWRG's version of World Wrestling Entertainment's Royal Rumble event. 30 men competed in the Rey del Ring, which was won by Oficial 911 when he eliminated Eterno to claim the victory as well as the Rey del Ring Championship belt from previous champion Oficial Factor.

== Production ==
=== Background ===
The Mexican professional wrestling company International Wrestling Revolution Group (IWRG; at times referred to as Grupo Internacional Revolución in Mexico) started their annual Rey del Ring ("King of the Ring") event in 2002, creating an annual event around the eponymous Rey del Ring match, a 30-man elimination match similar in concept to the WWE's Royal Rumble match. From 2002 until the 2011 event the "prize" for winning the match itself was simply the prestige of outlasting 29 other competitors, but at the 2011 Rey del Ring IWRG introduced the IWR Rey del Ring Championship complete with a belt to symbolize the championship that would be awarded to the winner each year. At that point in time the Rey del Ring title became a championship that could be defended and lost or won in matches in between the annual tournaments. For the tournament the champion would vacate the Rey del Ring Championship prior to the actual Rey del Ring match itself. All Rey del Ring shows, as well as the majority of the IWRG shows in general are held in "Arena Naucalpan", owned by the promoters of IWRG and their main arena. The 2013 Rey del Ring was the eleventh over all Rey del Ring tournament held by IWRG.

=== Storylines ===
The event featured three professional wrestling matches with different wrestlers involved in pre-existing scripted feuds, plots and storylines. Wrestlers were portrayed as either heels (referred to as rudos in Mexico, those that portray the "bad guys") or faces (técnicos in Mexico, the "good guy" characters) as they followed a series of tension-building events, which culminated in a wrestling match or series of matches.

== Results ==
No.	Results	Stipulations
1	Seiya defeated Dragón Celestial	Tag team best two-out-of-three falls tag team match
2	Araña de Plata and Fulgore defeated Astro Rey, Jr. and Rayo Tapatío I	Best two-out-of-three falls six-man tag team match
3	Oficial 911 won the 2013 Rey del Ring tournament Also in the match: Alan Extreme, El Ángel, Avisman, Canis Lupus, Carta Brava, Jr., Danny Casas, Chico Che, Cien Caras, Jr., Dinamic Black, Eita, Apolo Estrada, Jr., Eterno, Golden Magic, Hijo de Dr. Wagner, Hijo de Máscara Año 2000, Hijo de Pirata Morgan, Imposible, Mosco X-Fly, Niko, Oficial AK-47, Oficial Fierro, Pantera, Picudo, Jr., Rayan, Tony Rivera, El Sable, Saruman, Spartan and Tomahawk	2013 IWRG Rey del Ring, 30-man elimination match

=== 2013 Rey del Ring order of eliminations ===
#	Eliminated	Eliminated by
1	Tony Rivera	
2	Saruman	
3	Alan Extreme	
4	Rayan	
5	Oficial AK-47	
6	Carta Brava, Jr.	
7	Imposible	
8	Dinamic Black	
9	Avisman	
10	El Sable	
11	Picudo, Jr.	
12	Spartan	
13	Apolo Estrada, Jr.	
14	Niko	
15	Eita	
16	Danny Casas	
17	Tomahawk	
18	El Ángel	
19	Canis Lupus	
20	Oficial Fierro	
21	Pantera	
22	Golden Magic	
23	Hijo de Dr. Wagner	
24	Cien Caras, Jr.	
25	Chico Che	
26	Hijo de Máscara Año 2000	
27	Mosco X-Fly	
28	Hijo de Pirata Morgan	
29	Eterno	
Winner	Oficial 911	
