= Guerra de Familias (2013) =

2013 International Wrestling Revolution Group event

- Poster promoting the La Guerra de Familias tournament
- Promotion: International Wrestling Revolution Group
- Date: March 31, 2013
- City: Naucalpan, State of Mexico
- Venue: Arena Naucalpan

Event chronology
← Previous; Prisión Fatal	Next → Guerra del Golfo

Guerra de Familias chronology
← Previous; 2012	Next → 2015

La Guerra de Familias (2013) (Spanish for "War of the Families") was a professional wrestling major event, produced by the Mexico based International Wrestling Revolution Group (IWRG) professional wrestling promotion. The event took on March 31, 2013, at "Arena Naucalpan" in Naucalpan, State of Mexico, IWRG's main venue. The focal point of the event was a four team tag team tournament between four "families".

== Background ==
The event featured seven professional wrestling matches with different wrestlers, where some were involved in pre-existing scripted feuds or storylines and others simply put together by the matchmakers without a backstory. Being a professional wrestling event matches are not won legitimately through athletic competition; they are instead won via predetermined outcomes to the matches that is kept secret from the general public. Wrestlers portray either heels (the bad guys, referred to as Rudos in Mexico) or faces (fan favorites or Técnicos in Mexico).

The Guerra de Familias tournament paid respect to the fact that wrestling is a family tradition in Lucha libre, with a large number of second and third-generation wrestlers following the footsteps of their relatives and becoming wrestlers themselves. For the tournament IWRG's definition of "Family" included by actual blood relationship, storyline family relationship and one team where the team name included the word "Family". Los Traumas (Trauma I and Trauma II) were legitimately related to each other, both sons of wrestler Negro Navarro and had been a regular tag team since 2002. wrestlers Heavy Metal and Danny Casas represented the "Casas Family", although it has never been officially confirmed if Danny Casas is an actual member of the family or if it is a fictional ring name he is using. The Los Junior Dinamitas team of Cien Caras, Jr. and Hijo de Máscara Año 2000 were not actually related although in the fictional storylines of Lucha Libre they were supposed to be cousins, as Hijo de Máscara Año 2000 is the son of Máscara Año 2000 while Cien Caras, Jr. paid Cien Caras for the use of the character but is not related to him. The fourth team represented a group called La Familia de Tijuana ("The Family from Tijuana"), but Eterno and Mosco X-Fly are not related, nor did they promote them as actually being related. IWRG did not put a specific prize up for the winner of the tournament nor promoting it as the winners would receive a match for the IWRG Intercontinental Tag Team Championship, especially since Trauma I held the championship with his father at that point in time.

On the undercard IWRG booked a "Five Match Fighters" match, their term for a multi-man elimination match that included five wrestlers in the ring at the same time. The winner of the match, the man to outlast the other four competitors would be awarded with a match for the IWRG Intercontinental Middleweight Championship, held by El Ángel at a later date. The five competitors included IWRG mid-card workers Carta Brava, Jr. and Centvrión as well as the lower ranked, less experienced Mr. Leo, Fulgore and Power Bull.

== Event ==
The La Guerra de Familias show started out with a Best two-out-of-three falls tag team match between Mexicans Ángel del Amor and Seiya and a team of Japanese wrestlers both originally from Dragon Gate in Japan, Eita and Tomahawk. The two Dragon Gate wrestlers had both come to Mexico as part of their training, learning international styles and worked regularly for IWRG and a number of other independent promotions. Eita had been in Mexico since May, 2012 and Tomahawk since early March, 2013. The Dragon Gate team won the match in two straight falls to take the victory 2 falls to none. In the second match of the night four wrestlers would have to be eliminated for the final wrestler to earn a match against IWRG Intercontinental Middleweight Champion El Ángel at an unspecified date in the future. After the eliminations of Power bull, Mr. Leo and WWS World Welterweight Champion Carta Brava, Jr. the match came down to Centvrión and Fulgore. The match was described as both "exiting" and "fantastic" and saw Centvrión pin his opponent to win the match and be named the number one contender. The third match of the night was a traditional Best two-out-of-three falls six-man tag team match, the most common match form in Lucha Libre. The match saw the rudo team of Black Terry, El Ángel and Scorpio, Jr. face off against the tecnico side consisting of Dinamic Black, Dr. Cerebro and Veneno. Neither side teamed up on a regular basis and was paired up by IWRG for no obvious reason. The two teams split the first two falls between them, forcing the match to go to a third and deciding fall. During the latter part of the match Dinamic Black and El Ángel were both out of action after a dive outside the ring, allowing Dr. Cerebro to pin Black terry and Veneno eliminated Scorpio, Jr. after landing a Senton leap off the top rope on his opponent.

The La Guerra de Familias tournament started out with all eight wrestlers in the ring for a Battle Royal where the order of elimination determined which teams would face off in the first round of the tournament. When one wrestler from a team was eliminated the entire team would be eliminated, ending the Battle Royal when there were only four wrestlers left in the ring. The match saw Cien Caras, Jr., Hijo de Máscara Año 2000, Danny Casas and Heavy Metal remain in the ring while Los Traumas and La Familia de Tijuana being eliminated. With the "Seeding" battle royal over the tournament moved into the tag team portion as Los Traumas faced off against La Familia de Tijuana in a one-fall match. During the match Trauma I aggravated an old knee injury, making him unable to perform a lot of moves during the match. Trauma II was still able to win the match on the team's behalf as he took advantage of Eterno and Mosco X-Fly hitting each other by mistake. The other second round match saw the experienced team known as Los Junior Dinamitas defeat Heavy Metal and Danny Casas, two wrestlers who did not work together as a regular team before the tournament. Following the match Heavy Metal made several challenges to Los Junior Dinmaitas. The doctor would not allow Trauma I to compete in the tournament final due to his knee injury, leaving Trauma II to face both Cien Caras, Jr. and Hijo de Máscara Año 2000 in the match. With the two-on-one advantage Los Junior Dinamitas were quickly able to defeat Trauma II to win the tournament. Following their victory Los Junior Dinamitas made a challenge to Trauma I and Negro Navarro to defend the IWRG Intercontinental Tag Team Championship against them in the near future.

== Aftermath ==
Los Junior Dinamitas faced Trauma I and Negro Navarro a week later, challenging for the Tag Team Championship. Despite still being hampered by the injury Negro Navarro and Trauma I were able to defeat Cien Caras, Jr. and Hijo de Máscara Año 2000 to retain their championship.

=== Results ===
No.	Results	Stipulations
1	Eita and Tomahawk defeated Ángel del Amor and Seiya	Two out of three falls tag team match
2	Centvrión defeated Fulgore, Carta Brava, Jr., Mr. Leo, and Power Bull	"5 Match Fighters"; #1 Contender for the IWRG Intercontinental Middleweight Championship
3	Dinamic Black, Dr. Cerebro, and Veneno defeated Black Terry, El Ángel, and Scorpio, Jr.	Two out of three falls six-man tag team match
4	Cien Caras, Jr., Hijo de Máscara Año 2000, Danny Casas, and Heavy Metal defeated Eterno, Trauma I, Trauma II, and Mosco X-Fly	La Guerra de Familias seeding battle royal
5	Los Traumas (Trauma I and Trauma II) defeated La Familia de Tijuana (Eterno and Mosco X-Fly)	La Guerra de Familias semi-final match
6	Los Junior Dinamitas (Cien Caras, Jr. and Hijo de Máscara Año 2000) defeated The Casas Family (Danny Casas and Heavy Metal)	La Guerra de Familias semi-final match
7	Los Junior Dinamitas (Cien Caras, Jr. and Hijo de Máscara Año 2000) defeated La Traumas (Trauma I and Trauma II)	La Guerra de Familias final match
