= Caravana de Campeones (2018) =

2018 International Wrestling Revolution Group event

- Official poster for the show
- Date: September 9, 2018
- City: Naucalpan, State of Mexico
- Venue: Arena Naucalpan

Event chronology
← Previous; IWRG Ejecucion Total	Next → Relevos Increibles de Máscaras y Cabelleras

IWRG Caravana de Campeones chronology
← Previous; 2017	Next → —

Caravana de Campeones (2018) (Spanish for "Caravan of Champions") was a major annual lucha libre event produced and scripted by the Mexican Lucha Libre, or professional wrestling promotion, International Wrestling Revolution Group (IWRG). The show was held on September 9, 2018 in Arena Naucalpan, Naucalpan, State of Mexico, Mexico, IWRG's main arena. The 2018 version of the event was the eleventh overall show IWRG has held under the Caravana de Campeones banner. As the name indicates, the focal point of the show was the various championships promoted by IWRG, as five of the matches were for a championship.

In the main event Mr. Electro successfully defended the IWRG Intercontinental Heavyweight Championship against El Hijo de Médico Asesino. Also on the show Imposible defeated Dr. Cerebro for the IWRG Intercontinental Middleweight Championship and El Hijo de Canis Lupus defeated El Hijo del Alebrije. Cerebro Negro successfully defended the IWRG Intercontinental Welterweight Championship against Relampargo and Dragon Bane defended the IWRG Rey del Aire Championship. Also on the show long-time fan favorite Chico-Che defeated the leader of Los Tortugas Negra Teelo in a Lucha de Apuestas, hair vs. hair match leaving the "Ninja Turtle" with no hair. The show featured three additional, non-title matches.

== Production ==
=== Background ===
Professional wrestling has a long running tradition of holding shows that feature several championship matches, and at times actually promoting shows as an "all championship matches" shows. The earliest documented "All-Championship" show is the EMLL Carnaval de Campeones ("Carnival of Champions") held on January 13, 1965. In 2007, WWE held a pay-per-view called Vengeance: Night of Champions, making WWE Night of Champions a recurring theme. Starting in 2008, the Mexican lucha libre promotion International Wrestling Revolution Group (IWRG) has held a regular major show labeled Caravana de Campeones, Spanish for "Caravan of Champions" using the same concept for a major annual show. All Caravana de Campeones shows have been held in Arena Naucalpan, IWRG's home arena, the location of all of their major shows through the years. The 2015 show was the ninth time IWRG has held a Caravana de Campeones show, having not held one in 2010 but held twice in both 2012 and 2013. IWRG held a Caranana show in October 2015, skipped the show in 2016, and then held another in October 2017. The 2018 version of the Caravana de Campeones was the 11th overall show under the name.

=== Storylines ===
The event featured five professional wrestling matches with different wrestlers involved in pre-existing scripted feuds, plots and storylines. Wrestlers were portrayed as either heels (referred to as rudos in Mexico, those that portray the "bad guys") or faces (técnicos in Mexico, the "good guy" characters) as they followed a series of tension-building events, which culminated in a wrestling match or series of matches.

== Results ==
No.	Results	Stipulations
1	Angel Estrella Jr. defeated Chef Benito	Singles match
2	Death Metal and Demonio Infernal defeated Alas de Acero and Mexica	Tag team match
3	Pasion Crystal defeated Fantasma de la Opera by disqualification	Singles match
4	Cerebro Negro (c) defeated Relampago	Best two-out-of-three-falls match for the IWRG Intercontinental Welterweight Championship
5	Imposible defeated Dr. Cerebro (c)	Best two-out-of-three-falls match for the IWRG Intercontinental Middleweight Championship
6	Chico Che defeated Teelo	Lucha de Apuestas, hair vs. hair match
7	El Hijo de Canis Lupus defeated El Hijo del Alebrije (c)	Best two-out-of-three-falls match for the IWRG Junior de Juniors Championship
8	Dragon Bane (c) defeated Freelance	Best two-out-of-three-falls match for the IWRG Rey del Aire Championship
9	Mr. Electro (c) defeated El Hijo del Médico Asesino	Best two-out-of-three-falls match for the IWRG Intercontinental Heavyweight Championship
(c) / – the champion(s) heading into the match
