= Rey del Ring (2014) =

2014 International Wrestling Revolution Group event

- Official poster for the event, note that it does not list a single competitor for the Rey del Ring tournament.
- Promotion: International Wrestling Revolution Group
- Date: May 4, 2014
- City: Naucalpan, State of Mexico
- Venue: Arena Naucalpan

Event chronology
← Previous; Guerra del Golfo	Next → Prisión Fatal

IWRG Rey del Ring chronology
← Previous; 2013	Next → 2015

The Rey del Ring (2014) show (Spanish for "King of the Ring") was an annual professional wrestling major event produced by Mexican professional wrestling promotion International Wrestling Revolution Group (IWRG), and took place on May 4, 2014 in Arena Naucalpan, Naucalpan, State of Mexico, Mexico. The main event was the Eponymous IWRG Rey del Ring tournament, the twelfth annual version of the tournament, which is IWRG's version of WWE's Royal Rumble event.

== Production ==
=== Background ===
The Mexican professional wrestling company International Wrestling Revolution Group (IWRG; at times referred to as Grupo Internacional Revolución in Mexico) started their annual Rey del Ring ("King of the Ring") event in 2002, creating an annual event around the eponymous Rey del Ring match, a 30-man elimination match similar in concept to the WWE's Royal Rumble match. From 2002 until the 2011 event the "prize" for winning the match itself was simply the prestige of outlasting 29 other competitors, but at the 2011 Rey del Ring IWRG introduced the IWR Rey del Ring Championship complete with a belt to symbolize the championship that would be awarded to the winner each year. At that point in time the Rey del Ring title became a championship that could be defended and lost or won in matches in between the annual tournaments. For the tournament the champion would vacate the Rey del Ring Championship prior to the actual Rey del Ring match itself. All Rey del Ring shows, as well as the majority of the IWRG shows in general are held in "Arena Naucalpan", owned by the promoters of IWRG and their main arena. The 2014 Rey del Ring was the twelfth over all Rey del Ring tournament held by IWRG.

=== Storylines ===
The event featured three professional wrestling matches with different wrestlers involved in pre-existing scripted feuds, plots and storylines. Wrestlers were portrayed as either heels (referred to as rudos in Mexico, those that portray the "bad guys") or faces (técnicos in Mexico, the "good guy" characters) as they followed a series of tension-building events, which culminated in a wrestling match or series of matches.

== Results ==
No.	Results	Stipulations
1	Sky Angel defeated Skull Metal	Best two-out-of-three falls match
2	Los Fulgores (Fulgor I and Fulgor II) defeated Alfa and Omega	Tag team best two-out-of-three falls tag team match
3	El Hijo de Máscara Año 2000 won the 2014 Rey del Ring tournament Also in the match: AK-47, Alan Extreme, Ángel del Amor, Anubis Black, Apolo Estrada Jr., Astro Rey Jr., Avisman, Black Terry, Canis Lupus, Ciclon Black. Cien Caras Jr. Dr. Cerebro, Electro Boy. El Hijo del Diablo, Fierro, Golden Magic. Guerrero Mixtico Jr., Hip Hop Man. Imposible, Latigo, Metaleon, Picudo Jr., Pirata Morgan, Rayan. Relampago. Spartan, Tony Rivera, X-Fly and Zurdog	2014 IWRG Rey del Ring, 30-man elimination match
