= Rey del Ring (2011) =

2011 International Wrestling Revolution Group event

- Official Rey del Ring poster
- Promotion: International Wrestling Revolution Group
- Date: June 16, 2011
- City: Naucalpan, State of Mexico
- Venue: Arena Naucalpan
- Tagline(s): Quien serra el Nuevo Rey del Ring? (Who will be the new King of the Ring)

Event chronology
← Previous; Legado Final	Next → La Vengenza

IWRG Rey del Ring chronology
← Previous; 2010	Next → 2012

Rey del Ring (2011) (Spanish for "King of the Ring") was an annual professional wrestling major event produced by Mexican professional wrestling promotion International Wrestling Revolution Group (IWRG), which took place on June 16, 2011, in Arena Naucalpan, Naucalpan, State of Mexico, Mexico. The main event of the show was the Eponymous IWRG Rey del Ring tournament, the ninth version of the annual tournament, which is IWRG's version of WWE's Royal Rumble event. The Rey del Ring returned to IWRG's regular schedule in 2011 after no event was held in 2010, making the event the 10th overall tournament since 2002.

== Production ==
=== Background ===
The Mexican professional wrestling company International Wrestling Revolution Group (IWRG; at times referred to as Grupo Internacional Revolución in Mexico) started their annual Rey del Ring ("King of the Ring") event in 2002, creating an annual event around the eponymous Rey del Ring match, a 30-man elimination match similar in concept to the WWE's Royal Rumble match. From 2002 until the 2011 event the "prize" for winning the match itself was simply the prestige of outlasting 29 other competitors, but at the 2011 Rey del Ring IWRG introduced the IWR Rey del Ring Championship complete with a belt to symbolize the championship that would be awarded to the winner each year. At that point in time the Rey del Ring title became a championship that could be defended and lost or won in matches in between the annual tournaments. For the tournament the champion would vacate the Rey del Ring Championship prior to the actual Rey del Ring match itself. All Rey del Ring shows, as well as the majority of the IWRG shows in general are held in "Arena Naucalpan", owned by the promoters of IWRG and their main arena. The 2011 Rey del Ring was the ninth over all Rey del Ring tournament held by IWRG.

=== Storylines ===
The event featured three professional wrestling matches with different wrestlers involved in pre-existing scripted feuds, plots and storylines. Wrestlers were portrayed as either heels (referred to as rudos in Mexico, those that portray the "bad guys") or faces (técnicos in Mexico, the "good guy" characters) as they followed a series of tension-building events, which culminated in a wrestling match or series of matches.

== Aftermath ==
Pantera made the first ever Rey del Ring Championship defense on July 10, 2011, when he defeated Último Gladiador to retain the championship. The championship was vacated on the day of the 2012 Rey del Ring tournament so that the winner of the tournament could become the new Rey del Ring Champion at the same time.

== Results ==
No.	Results	Stipulations
1	Alan Extreme and Keshin Black defeated Tritón and Volaris	Two out of three falls tag team match
2	Carta Brava, Jr., El Pollo Asesino and Imposible defeated Comando Negro, Dinamic Black and El Hijo del Pantera	Two out of three falls six-man tag team match
3	El Pantera won the 2011 Rey del Ring tournament Also in the match: Oficial 911, Oficial AK-47, Avisman, Bestia 666, Black Terry, Bobby Lee, Jr., Bombero Infernal, Centvrión, Cerebro Negro, Chico Che, Dinamic Black, Dr. Cerebro, Drago, El Hijo del Brazo, El Hijo del Diablo, Eterno, Oficial Fierro, Fresero, Jr., Golden Magic, Máscara Año 2000, Jr., Multifacético, Pimpinela Escarlata, Saruman, Scorpio, Jr., Trauma I, Trauma II, Último Gladiador, Veneno, and Villano IV	2011 IWRG Rey del Ring, 30-man elimination match

=== 2011 Rey del Ring entrants and eliminations ===
Key

Symbol	Meaning
$	Tournament winner

Draw	Entrant	Order	Eliminated by	Eliminations
1	Bombero Infernal	4	Avisman	El Hijo del Brazo
2	El Hijo del Brazo	2	Bombero Infernal	None
3	Saruman	1	Trauma II	None
4	Trauma II	3	Eterno	Saruman
5	Chico Che	8	Dr. Cerebro	None
6	El Hijo del Diablo	7	Dr. Cerebro	None
7	Avisman	9	Dr. Cerebro	Bombero Infernal
8	Eterno	5	Golden Magic	Trauma II
9	Golden Magic	6	Fresero, Jr.	Eterno
10	Fresero, Jr.	11	Villano IV	Golden Magic
11	Drago	13	Oficial 911, Oficial AK-47, Oficial Fierro	None
12	Dr. Cerebro	10	Villano IV	El Hijo del Diablo, Chico Che, Avisman
13	Villano IV	15	Oficial AK-47	Dr. Cerebro, Fresero, Jr., Pimpinela Escarlata
14	Pimpinela Escarlata	14	Villano IV	None
15	Oficial AK-47	19	Scorpio, Jr.	Drago, Pimpinela Escarlata, Centvrión, Bobby Lee, Jr.
16	Centvrión	16	Oficial AK-47	None
17	Dinamic Black	12	Oficial 911	None
18	Cerebro Negro	17	Trauma I	None
19	Bobby Lee, Jr.	18	Oficial AK-47	None
20	Oficial Fierro	20	Veneno	Drago
21	Trauma I	21	Scorpio, Jr.	Cerebro Negro
22	Oficial 911	23	Multifacético	Dinamic Black, Drago, Scorpio, Jr.
23	El Pantera $	30	Winner'	Multifacético, Máscara Año 2000, Jr., Último Gladiador
24	Scorpio, Jr.	22	Oficial 911	Trauma I
25	Último Gladiador	29	El Pantera	Oficial AK-47, Black Terry, Bestia 666
26	Veneno	25	Black Terry	None
27	Máscara Año 2000, Jr.	27	El Pantera	Oficial Fierro
28	Bestia 666	28	Último Gladiador	None
29	Multifacético	24	El Pantera	Oficial 911
30	Black Terry	26	Último Gladiador	Veneno
