= IWRG Rey del Ring =

Professional tournament by International Wrestling Revolution Group

IWRG Rey del Ring Championship
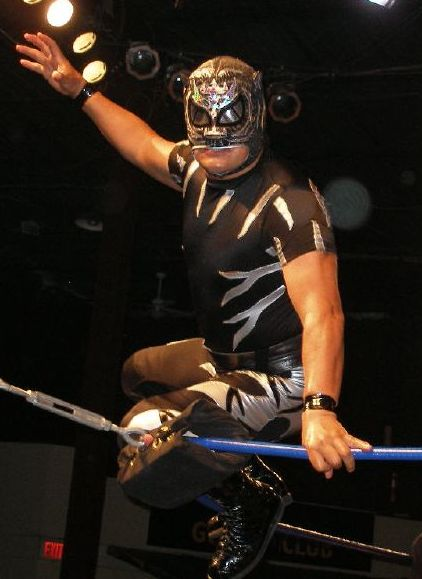
- El Pantera, winner of the 2011 Rey del Ring tournament and first holder of the Rey del Ring Championship

Details
- Promotion: International Wrestling Revolution Group (IWRG)
- Date established: June 16, 2011
- Current champion: Vangellys
- Date won: May 12, 2024
Statistics
- First champion: El Pantera
- Most reigns: Hijo de Máscara Año 2000, Oficial Factor and Hijo de Pirata Morgan (2 reigns)
- Longest reign: Demonio Infernal (672 days)
- Shortest reign: Eterno (49 days)
- Oldest champion: Pantera (47 years)
- Youngest champion: Hijo de Pirata Morgan (20 years)
- Heaviest champion: Ricky Cruz (123 kg (271 lb))
- Lightest champion: Hijo de Pirata Morgan (80 kg (180 lb))

The IWRG Rey del Ring (Spanish for "King of the Ring") refers both to an annual tournament and a professional wrestling championship promoted by the Mexican Lucha libre professional wrestling promotion International Wrestling Revolution Group (IWRG). From 2002 until 2011 the IWRG Rey del Ring only referred to an annual 30-man tournament, but as of the 2011 tournament there is also a physical championship belt that is and can be defended throughout the year.

As it is a professional wrestling championship, the championship was not won not by actual competition, but by a scripted ending to a match determined by the bookers and match makers. (Note: Hornbaker (2016) p. 550: "Professional wrestling is a sport in which match finishes are predetermined. Thus, win–loss records are not indicative of a wrestler's genuine success based on their legitimate abilities – but on now much, or how little they were pushed by promoters") On occasion the promotion declares a championship vacant, which means there is no champion at that point in time. This can either be due to a storyline, (Note: Duncan & Will (2000) p. 271, Chapter: Texas: NWA American Tag Team Title [World Class, Adkisson] "Championship held up and rematch ordered because of the interference of manager Gary Hart") or real life issues such as a champion suffering an injury being unable to defend the championship, (Note: Duncan & Will (2000) p. 20, Chapter: (United States: 19th Century & widely defended titles – NWA, WWF, AWA, IW, ECW, NWA) NWA/WCW TV Title "Rhodes stripped on 85/10/19 for not defending the belt after having his leg broken by Ric Flair and Ole & Arn Anderson") or leaving the company. (Note: Duncan & Will (2000) p. 201, Chapter: (Memphis, Nashville) Memphis: USWA Tag Team Title "Vacant on 93/01/18 when Spike leaves the USWA.")

== Rey del Ring tournament ==
Originally the Rey del Ring tournament was a 30-man elimination match, starting with four wrestlers in the ring, then when a wrestler was eliminated through pinfall, submission, count out or disqualification another participant was added until 29 men had been eliminated. In 2008 IWRG changed the format to be more like World Wrestling Entertainment's Royal Rumble match; two men start in the ring and a new wrestler joins the match at a specific time interval. Unlike the Royal Rumble throwing a wrestler out of the ring did not result in elimination. The first tournament, the 2002 Rey del Ring was held on June 6, 2002, in IWRG's primary arena, Arena Naucalpan in Naucalpan, State of Mexico, Mexico. The tournament was won by Último Vampiro when he eliminated Bombero Infernal as the last participant. In 2004 the winner of that year's Rey del Ring tournament was also awarded the vacant IWRG Intercontinental Middleweight Championship; the match saw Fantasy eliminate Avisman as the last participant to win the tournament and the championship. Cerebro Negro won both the 2005 and 2006 tournaments, making him the only person to win the tournament twice. In 2007 the Rey del Ring was won by Yamato, the first non-Mexican to win the tournament. Yamato worked for IWRG through a deal struck with Japanese wrestling promotion All Japan Pro Wrestling (AJPW) that allowed AJPW to send young wrestlers to Mexico to gain in-ring experience. The 2008 Rey del Ring was won by Scorpio, Jr. while the 2009 Rey del Ring tournament was won by Puerto Rican Ricky Cruzz. The two Rey del Ring winners would later team up to win the IWRG Intercontinental Tag Team Championship from Los Junior Dinamitas (El Hijo de Cien Caras and Máscara Año 2000, Jr.). IWRG did not hold a Rey del Ring tournament in 2010 and never gave an official explanation as to why not. In 2011 IWRG introduced the Rey del Ring Championship to be awarded to the winner of the 2011 Rey del Ring tournament winner El Pantera. Pantera would vacate the Championship on the date of the 2012 Rey del Ring tournament, allowing tournament winner Oficial Factor to become the new champion as well. After Oficial 911 won the 2013 Rey del Ring tournament Oficial Factor handed over the championship belt to 911.

== Rey del Ring Championship ==
El Pantera became the first ever Rey del Ring Champion as a result of winning the 2011 Rey del Ring tournament on June 16, 2011 when he eliminated Último Gladiador as the last tournament participant. He was awarded with an actual championship belt, to be work for IWRG matches and defended when appropriate between tournaments. Pantera made the first ever championship defense on July 10, 2011 when he successfully defeated Último Gladiador to retain the championship. The championship was vacated for the 2012 Rey del Ring tournament so that the winner of the tournament could become the new Rey del Ring Champion at the same time. Oficial Factor won the tournament, lastly eliminating Hijo del Pirata Morgan to win the Championship. on August 12, 2012 Hijo del Pirata Morgan became the first person to win the Rey del Ring Championship outside of the tournament when he defeated Oficial Factor. He held the championship for a total of 42 days, until September 23, 2012 when Oficial Factor regained the championship. Factor won the title in a Relevos Suicidas match that also included Trauma I and Mascara Ano 2000 Jr., and as a result of his victory Factor also won the IWRG Junior de Juniors Championship from Hijo del Pirata Morgan.

== Rey del Ring Tournament winners ==
Year	Winner	Date	Location	Notes
2002	Último Vampiro	June 9, 2002	Naucalpan, State of Mexico, Mexico	
2003	Unknown	2003	Naucalpan, State of Mexico, Mexico	(Note: Reference to the 2003 tournament has been found but no winner was identified.)
2004	Fantasy	March 18, 2004	Naucalpan, State of Mexico, Mexico	Won the vacant IWRG Intercontinental Middleweight Championship as a result.
2005	Cerebro Negro	November 17, 2005	Naucalpan, State of Mexico, Mexico	
2006	Cerebro Negro	2006	Naucalpan, State of Mexico, Mexico	Only two-time winner.
2007	Yamato	July 26, 2007	Naucalpan, State of Mexico, Mexico	
2008	Scorpio, Jr.	July 24, 2008	Naucalpan, State of Mexico, Mexico	
2009	Ricky Cruzz	July 16, 2009	Naucalpan, State of Mexico, Mexico	
2010	N/A	N/A	N/A	No Rey del Ring tournament was held in 2010
2011	El Pantera	June 16, 2011	Naucalpan, State of Mexico, Mexico	
2012	Oficial Factor	May 31, 2012	Naucalpan, State of Mexico, Mexico	
2013	Oficial 911	May 19, 2013	Naucalpan, State of Mexico, Mexico	
2014	Hijo de Máscara Año 2000	May 4, 2014	Naucalpan, State of Mexico, Mexico	
2015	Ricky Cruz	April 5, 2015	Naucalpan, State of Mexico, Mexico	
2016	Máscara Año 2000 Jr.	December 11, 2016	Naucalpan, State of Mexico, Mexico	
2017	Imposible	May 14, 2017	Naucalpan, State of Mexico, Mexico	
2018	Emperador Azteca	May 20, 2018	Naucalpan, State of Mexico, Mexico	
2019	Demonio Infernal	May 19, 2019	Naucalpan, State of Mexico, Mexico	
2020	Demonio Infernal	June 14, 2020; August 23, 2020; August 30, 2020; September 6, 2020	Naucalpan, State of Mexico, Mexico	
2021	Hijo de Canis Lupus	May 9, 2021	Naucalpan, State of Mexico, Mexico	
2022	El Hijo de Pirata Morgan	May 15, 2022	Naucalpan, State of Mexico, Mexico	
2023	El Hijo de Pirata Morgan	May 7, 2023	Naucalpan, State of Mexico, Mexico	
2024	Vangellys	May 5, 2024; May 12, 2024	Naucalpan, State of Mexico, Mexico	

== Rey del Ring Championship history ==
Key
No.	Overall reign number
Reign	Reign number for the specific champion
Days	Number of days held
N/A	Unknown information
(NLT)	Championship change took place "no later than" the date listed
†	Championship change is unrecognized by the promotion
+	Current reign is changing daily

No.	Champion	Championship change			Reign statistics		Notes	Ref.
No.	Champion	Date	Event	Location	Reign	Days	Notes	Ref.
1	El Pantera	June 16, 2011	Rey del Ring (2011)	Naucalpan, State of Mexico, Mexico	1	350	Awarded a championship belt after winning the 2011 Rey del Ring tournament.	
—	Vacated	May 31, 2012	—	—	—	—	Vacated for the 2012 tournament.	
2	Oficial Factor	May 31, 2012	Rey del Ring (2012)	Naucalpan, State of Mexico, Mexico	1	91	Won the 2012 Rey del Ring tournament.	
3	Hijo de Pirata Morgan	August 12, 2012	Caravan de Campeones (2012)	Naucalpan, State of Mexico, Mexico	1	42		
4	Oficial Factor	September 23, 2012	IWRG show	Naucalpan, State of Mexico, Mexico	2	238		
5	Oficial 911	May 19, 2013	Rey del Ring (2013)	Naucalpan, State of Mexico, Mexico	1	350		
6	Hijo de Máscara Año 2000	May 4, 2014	Rey del Ring (2014)	Naucalpan, State of Mexico, Mexico	1	154		
7	El Hijo de Dos Caras	October 5, 2014	IWRG show	Naucalpan, State of Mexico, Mexico	1	98		
8	Hijo de Máscara Año 2000	January 11, 2015	IWRG show	Naucalpan, State of Mexico, Mexico	2	84		
—	Vacated	April 5, 2015	—	—	—	—	Vacated for the 2015 tournament.	
9	Ricky Cruz	April 5, 2015	Rey del Ring (2015)	Naucalpan, State of Mexico, Mexico	2	616		
—	Vacated	December 11, 2016	—	—	—	—	Vacated for the 2016 tournament.	
10	Máscara Año 2000 Jr.	December 11, 2016	Rey del Ring (2016)	Naucalpan, State of Mexico, Mexico	1	154		
—	Vacated	May 14, 2017	—	—	—	—	Vacated for the 2017 tournament.	
11	Imposible	May 14, 2017	Rey del Ring (2017)	Naucalpan, State of Mexico, Mexico	1	371	Won the 2017 Rey del Ring tournament	
—	Vacated	May 30, 2018	—	—	—	—	Vacated for the 2018 tournament.	
12	Emperador Azteca	May 20, 2018	Rey del Ring (2018)	Naucalpan, State of Mexico, Mexico	1	364	Won the 2018 Rey del Ring tournament	
—	Vacated	May 19, 2019	—	—	—	—	Vacated for the 2019 tournament.	
13	Demonio Infernal	May 19, 2019	Rey del Ring (2019)	Naucalpan, State of Mexico, Mexico	1	672	This was a 30-man battle royal where Demonio Infernal won by lastly eliminating Huracan Ramirez Jr.	
14	Eterno	March 21, 2021	Guerreros de Acero	Naucalpan, State of Mexico, Mexico	1	49	This was a Lucha de Apuestas Hair and Mask vs Titles tag team match between Eterno (hair) and El Hijo del Espectro Jr. (mask) against Fresero Jr. (Intercontinental Heavyweight) and Demonio Infernal (Rey del Ring). Eterno pinned Demonio Infernal to win the title.	
—	Vacated	May 9, 2021	—	—	—	—	Vacated for the 2021 tournament.	
15	Hijo de Canis Lupus	May 9, 2021	Rey del Ring	Naucalpan, State of Mexico, Mexico	1	371	Defeated DMT Azul by DQ to win the vacant title. DMT Azul performed a piledriver (which is a banned move in Mexico), being DQ'd, so Hijo de Canis Lupus won the title.	
—	Vacated	May 15, 2022	—	—	—	—	Vacated for the 2022 tournament.	
16	Hijo del Pirata Morgan	May 15, 2022	Rey del Ring	Naucalpan, State of Mexico, Mexico	2	364	This was a 30-man battle royal where Hijo del Pirata Morgan won by lastly eliminating Flamita.	
17	Hijo de Canis Lupus (II)	May 14, 2023	IWRG show	Naucalpan, State of Mexico, Mexico	1	126	Not to be confused with the original Hijo de Canis Lupus, which currently goes by the name, Alpha Wolf.	
18	Vito Fratelli	September 17, 2023	Lucha Libre Luchadores Al Grito De Guerra	Naucalpan, State of Mexico, Mexico	1	238		
19	Vangellys	May 12, 2024	IWRG show	Naucalpan, State of Mexico, Mexico	1	777+		

== Combined reigns ==
As of June 28, 2026.

†	Indicates the current champion

Rank	Wrestler	No. of reigns	Combined days
1	Demonio Infernal	1	672
2	Ricky Cruz	1	616
3	El Hijo de Canis Lupus	1	371
3	Imposible	1	371
5	Emperador Azteca	1	364
5	El Hijo de Pirata Morgan	2	364
7	El Pantera	1	350
7	Oficial 911	1	350
9	Oficial Factor	2	329
10	Hijo de Máscara Año 2000	2	258
11	Vito Fratelli	1	238
12	Máscara Año 2000 Jr.	1	154
13	Hijo de Canis Lupus (II)	1	126
14	El Hijo de Dos Caras	1	98
15	Eterno	1	49
16	Vangellys †	1	777+

== Rey del Ring (2002) ==
Rey del Ring (2002)
- Promotion: International Wrestling Revolution Group
- Date: April 21, 2002
- City: Naucalpan, State of Mexico
- Venue: Arena Naucalpan

Event chronology
← Previous; IWRG 6th Anniversary Show	Next → El Castillo del Terror (2002)

Rey del Ring chronology
← Previous; First	Next → Rey del Ring (2004)

The very first 'Rey del Ring tournament was held on April 21, 2002, produced and scripted by IWRG and held in Arena Naucalpan. While most of the match results are known, sources are unclear on who competed in the Rey del Ring Torneo Cibernetico match, only recording that Bombero Infernal won the match.

No.	Results	Stipulations
1	Avisman defeated Maligno	Best Two Out Of Three Falls Match
2	Black Jaguar defeated Zonik 2000	Best Two Out Of Three Falls Match
3	Cirujano and Paramedico defeated Los Megas (Mega and Ultra Mega)	Best Two Out Of Three Falls Tag Team Match
4	Los Payasos Tricolor (Coco Blanco, Coco Rojo and Coco Verde) defeated Comando Delta, Engendro and Toro Irisson	Best Two Out Of Three Falls Six Man Tag Team Match
5	Bombero Infernal won	Rey del Ring Torneo Cibernetico elimination match

== Rey del Ring (2004) ==
Rey del Ring (2004)
- Promotion: International Wrestling Revolution Group
- Date: March 18, 2004
- City: Naucalpan, State of Mexico
- Venue: Arena Naucalpan

Event chronology
← Previous; IWRG 8th Anniversary Show	Next → El Castillo del Terror (2004)

Rey del Ring chronology
← Previous; Rey del Ring (2002)	Next → Rey del Ring (2005)

The 2004 Rey del Ring show was a Mexican lucha libre, or professional wrestling supercard show held March 18, 2004. The show was produced and scripted by International Wrestling Revolution Group (IWRG) and was held in Arena Naucalpan, IWRG's main venue, located Naucalpan, State of Mexico, Mexico. The show marked the second time IWRG hed a ""Rey del Ring" ("King of the Ring") and it would later grow into an annual tradition. Due to minimal record keeping for professional wrestling the full show results are not known. It is only known that Fantasy won the "Rey del Ring" tournament, and as a result won the vacant IWRG Intercontinental Middleweight Championship as a result.

Results

No.	Results	Stipulations
1	Fantasy won the tournament, opponents undocumented	Rey del Ring elimination match for the IWRG Intercontinental Middleweight Championship
