= Rey del Ring (2017) =

2017 International Wrestling Revolution Group event

- Official poster of the event
- Date: May 14, 2017
- City: Naucalpan, State of Mexico
- Venue: Arena Naucalpan

Event chronology
← Previous; Guerra del Golfo	Next → 3 Cabelleras vs. 3 Cabelleras

IWRG Rey del Ring chronology
← Previous; 2016	Next → 2018

The Rey del Ring (2017) show (Spanish for "King of the Ring") was a major annual lucha libre event produced and scripted by Mexican professional wrestling promotion International Wrestling Revolution Group (IWRG), and took place on May 14, 2017 in Arena Naucalpan, Naucalpan, State of Mexico, Mexico. The main event was the Eponymous IWRG Rey del Ring tournament, the fifteenth annual version of the tournament, IWRG's version of WWE's Royal Rumble, multi-man elimination event.

In IWRG the winner of the Rey del Ring tournament also wins the IWRG Rey del Ring Championship, after the previous champion Imposible vacated the championship prior to the match. Imposible outlasted 29 other wrestlers to win the 2017 version of the tournament and the championship. The show included four additional matches.

== Background ==
The Mexican professional wrestling company International Wrestling Revolution Group (IWRG; at times referred to as Grupo Internacional Revolución in Mexico) started their annual Rey del Ring ("King of the Ring") event in 2002, creating an annual event around the eponymous Rey del Ring match, a 30-man elimination match similar in concept to the WWE's Royal Rumble match. From 2002 until the 2011 event, the "prize" for winning the match itself was simply the prestige of outlasting 29 other competitors, but at the 2011 Rey del Ring, IWRG introduced the IWR Rey del Ring Championship complete with a belt to symbolize the championship that would be awarded to the winner each year. At that point in time, the Rey del Ring title became a championship that could be defended and lost or won in matches in between the annual tournaments. For the tournament the champion would vacate the Rey del Ring Championship prior to the actual Rey del Ring match itself. All Rey del Ring shows, as well as the majority of the IWRG shows in general are held in Arena Naucalpan, owned by the promoters of IWRG and their main arena. The 2017 Rey del Ring was the fifteenth over all Rey del Ring tournament held by IWRG.

== Event ==
The Rey del Ring event featured four professional wrestling matches with different wrestlers involved in pre-existing scripted feuds, plots and storylines. Wrestlers were portrayed as either heels (referred to as rudos in Mexico, those that portray the "bad guys") or faces (técnicos in Mexico, the "good guy" characters) as they followed a series of tension-building events, which culminated in a wrestling match or series of matches.

Prior to the main event, Máscara Año 2000 Jr. came to the ring carrying the IWRG Rey del Ring Championship belt with him. He looked visibly upset over having to give up the championship and immediately challenged the next champion to a match since he was not losing the championship in a match. The Rey del Ring tournament is a 30-man battle royal with staggered, timed entrants like the WWE' annual Royal Rumble match. For the 2017 tournament wrestlers entered every two minutes and could be eliminated by being pinned, forced to submit or thrown over the top rope to the floor. The match came down to Imposible and Super Mega as the last two wrestlers in the match. Imposible ended up pinning Super Mega after a move off the top rope, winning the match and claiming the IWRG Rey del Ring Championship.

== Results ==
No.	Results	Stipulations
1	Atomic Star and Lunatik Xtreme defeated Shadow Boy and Shaolin	Tag team match
2	Demonio Infernal, Taylor Wolf, and Villano III Jr. defeated Aramís, Black Dragón, and El Hijo del Alebrije	Six-man tag team match
3	Máquina Infernal, Máscara Año 2000 Jr., and Tackle defeated Danny Casas and Los Tortugas Ninja (Mike and Teelo)	Six-man tag team match
4	Imposible won the Rey del Ring, lastly eliminating Super Mega; Also in the match: El Hijo del Diablo, Vardeus, Oficial 911, Veneno, Kanon, Saruman, Killer Jr., Oficial AK-47, Tortuga Mike, Picudo Jr., Villano IV, Máquina Infernal, Argos, Mr. Electro, Tortuga Rafy, Heddi Karaoui, Black Terry, Diablo Jr., Apolo Estrada Jr., Danny Casas, Eterno, Cerebro Negro, Máscara Sagrada, Pantera, Tortuga Leo, Dragón Fly, Dinamic Black, and Black Warrior	2017 Rey del Ring elimination match for the IWRG Rey del Ring Championship
