= Relámpago (wrestler) =

Mexican professional wrestler

Personal information
- Born: February 14, 1981 (age 45) Saltillo, Coahuila, Mexico

Professional wrestling career
- Ring names: México; Relámpago
- Billed height: 1.67 m (5 ft 5 1/2 in)
- Billed weight: 74 kg (163 lb)
- Trained by: Ráfaga de Oro; Latino; El Mexicano; Gran Apache
- Debut: May 23, 2003

Relámpago (Spanish for lightning; born February 14, 1981) is a Mexican professional wrestler. He currently competes in the promotion International Wrestling Revolution Group (IWRG) and the Mexican independent circuit as a freelancer. Through AAA's business partnership with IWRG, he has also competed for Lucha Libre AAA Worldwide (AAA), from 2009 through 2012 and sporadically from 2018 to 2022. His real name is not a matter of public record, as is often the case with masked wrestlers in Mexico where their private lives are kept a secret from the wrestling fans.

== Professional wrestling career ==
=== Early career (2003–2009) ===
Relámpago made his in ring debut on May 23, 2003, at the Arena Obreros del Progreso in his hometown of Saltillo, Coahuila. Some time later, he began to wrestle in different arenas in the northern Mexico, mainly in the Arena Coliseo de Monterrey in Nuevo León and in the Arena Cuatro Caminos in Tamaulipas. On July 26, 2009, he wrestled at the Centro Banamex in Mexico City with the Desastre Total Ultraviolento (DTU) promotion during La Experiencia 2009. At the said show, Relámpago alongside Dance Boy defeated Paranoiko and Tóxico. Days later, on August 8, he participated in the event that marked the return of the Xtreme Latin American Wrestling promotion, which took place at the Arena López Mateos.

=== Asistencia, Asesoría y Administración (2009–2012) ===
On August 17, 2009, Relámpago made his debut in AAA. On May 15, 2010 at Lucha Futbolística, he won the eponymous Lucha Futbolística tournament, defeating three other competitors in a four way match. On June 6, at Triplemanía XVIII, Relámpago intervened in the AAA World Cruiserweight Championship match, distracting Extreme Tiger and allowing Christopher Daniels to eliminate him. On September 14, he teamed with Extreme Tiger to face Decnnis and Tigre Cota. Days later, Joaquín Roldán announced that AAA needed a tag team, as a plan to face La Milicia, which was why Relámpago and Extreme Tiger teamed up together. However, after not participating in any important event and the lack of activity in AAA, Relámpago left the company at the end of April 2012.

=== International Wrestling Revolution Group (2010–present) ===
In 2010, Relámpago began competing in the International Wrestling Revolution Group (IWRG). On January 22, 2017, Relámpago won the Middleweight Championship, defeating Imposible, after which an angry Imposible made a Lucha de Apuestas challenge. He would lose the title to Eterno on September 17, at Caravana de Campeones.

== Championships and accomplishments ==
- International Wrestling Revolution Group
  - IWRG Intercontinental Middleweight Championship (1 time)
- Lucha Libre AAA Worldwide
  - Lucha Futbolística (2010)
