= Trauma II =

Mexican professional wrestler

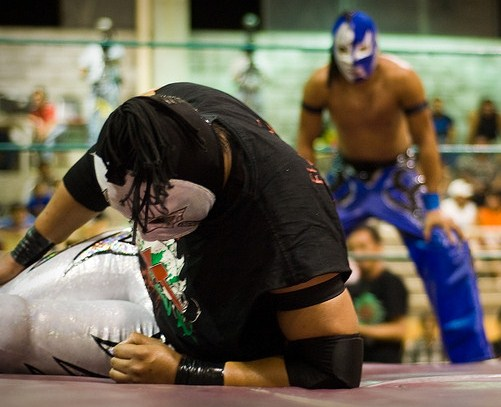
- Trauma II, facing off against his brother Trauma I

Personal information
- Born: Unrevealed; December 12, 1982 (age 43) Mexico City, Mexico

Professional wrestling career
- Ring name: Trauma II
- Billed height: 1.75 m (5 ft 9 in)
- Billed weight: 70 kg (154 lb)
- Trained by: Negro Navarro
- Debut: June 13, 2002

Trauma II (born December 12, 1982) is a Mexican professional wrestler, working on the Mexican independent circuit and as a freelance wrestler for promotions such as International Wrestling Revolution Group (IWRG), portraying a técnico ("good guy") wrestling character. Trauma II's real name is not a matter of public record, as is often the case with masked wrestlers in Mexico where their private lives are kept a secret from the wrestling fans. Trauma II is a second-generation wrestler, the son of Miguel Calderón Navarro, better known under his ring name Negro Navarro. He is the older brother of Trauma I, who he regularly teams up with under the name Los Traumas.

== Personal life ==
Trauma II is a second-generation wrestler, the son of Miguel Calderón Navarro, better known under his ring name Negro Navarro. He is the older brother of Trauma I, who he teams with under the name Los Traumas. He is the nephew of wrestlers Apolo Navarro and Drako. Both Traumas were trained for their professional career by their father, supporting them in wanting to become professional wrestlers and also helping them gain connections to promoters and make a name for themselves instead of wrestling as "Negro Navarro, Jr." or variations there off. While Navarro began his career without wearing a mask his sons both opted to start out as enmascarados (masked wrestlers), keeping their birth names a secret from the general public. On March 9, 2016, he was accused of kidnapping and rape by his ex-girlfriend

== Professional wrestling career ==
In Mexico, it is traditional to keep the true identify of a masked professional wrestler a secret, not revealing their real names and oftentimes not revealing what previous ring names they have competed under. While Trauma II is listed as having made his professional wrestling debut in 2002 it has not been confirmed if Trauma II worked under a previous masked identity to gain experience before making it public that he was the son of Negro Navarro. His younger brother made his professional wrestling debut only a few months earlier, using the ring name "Trauma I" as the brothers formed a regular tag team known as Los Traumas or Los Hermano Trauma ("The Trauma Brothers") who competed in and around Mexico City on the Mexican independent circuit, including working regularly for the Desastre Total Ultraviolento (DTU) and NWA Mexico professional wrestling promotions. The team often appeared on the same shows as their father, who also worked as a Freelance wrestler on the independent circuit. Around 2007 Trauma II began making appearances for International Wrestling Revolution Group (IWRG) and would become a regular in the years that followed, both as Los Traumas with his brother, as a singles competitor and also as part of La Dinastia de la Muerte ("The Dynasty of Death") when teaming with their father. The Dinastia de la Muerte name refers both to the fact that they are a family (a "dynasty") and also referring to Los Misioneros de la Muerte, a trio Negro Navarro formed with El Signo and El Texano in the 1980s. One of Trauma II's early appearances at a major IWRG show was on July 28, 2008, when he participated in the annual Rey del Ring ("King of the Ring") tournament. He was the 19th person eliminated in the match out of 30 participants by Tinieblas, Jr. On June 16, 2009, Trauma II defeated Zatura to become the new IWRG Intercontinental Lightweight Champion, starting a 59 days reign with the championship. His run as an IWRG singles champion ended on August 16, 2009, at IWRG's annual Guerra Revolucionaria ("Revolutionary War") event when he lost to Avisman. Trauma II continued to work for other promotions than IWRG, maintaining his status as a true freelance wrestler as he worked for companies such as NWA Mexico. On November 1, 2008, he participanted in a tournament the determine the first ever NWA Mexican Lightweight Champion, defeating ARkanos and Fantastico in the quarter and semi-finals but lost to Skayde in the finals of the tournament. In IWRG he was one of thirty participants in the 2009 Rey del Ring match, but was eliminated as the 24th person by Fantasma de la Opera while he himself eliminated Toxico and Chico Che. Trauma II also worked a number of Toryumon Mexico shows, giving him the opportunity to work with and against a number of wrestlers from Consejo Mundial de Lucha Libre (CMLL), Mexico's largest and the world's oldest wrestling promotion. In 2009 he won the 2009 Young Dragons Cup by defeating Astro Boy, El Hijo del Médico Asesino, El Hijo del Signo, El Hijo del Solar, Hiratsuka, Rolling, Jr. and Ulises Jr. in a torneo cibernetico Working for Toryumon Mexico also allowed Los Traumas to work against one of CMLL's top teams, Los Guerreros del Infierno (Rey Bucanero and Último Guerrero) as part of the 2010 Yamaha Cup tournament. On March 5, 2011, Los Traumas officially worked a match for CMLL, participating in CMLL's card for the Festival Mundial de Lucha Libre (the "World Wrestling Festival") where they teamed up with Dr. Cerebro only to lose to CMLL contracted wrestlers Puma King, Tiger Kid and Virus.

On May 15, 2011, Los Traumas put their masks on the line against the Alianza Universal de Lucha Libre (AULL) Tag Team Championship held by Los Compadres (Chucho el Roto and Iron Love). Los Traumas kept their masks safe as they defeated Los Compadres two falls to one on the UWE 44th Anniversary Show. Trauma II was the third man eliminated in the 2011 Rey del Ring tournament, the earliest elimination for either of the Trauma brothers. Trauma II was one of 16 competitors vying for the vacant IWRG Intercontinental Welterweight Championship, only to be eliminated in the quarter-finals by eventual tournament winner Golden Magic. On December 22, 2011, as a part of IWRG's celebration of the Arena Naucalpan 34th Anniversary, Los Traumas found themselves on opposite sides of a Relevos Suicidas match, where the two members of the losing team would be forced to wrestle under Luchas de Apuestas rules. Trauma I teamed up with Oficial AK-47 as they lost to Trauma II and Oficial 911. In the subsequent Luchas de Apuestas match Trauma I defeated AK-47, forcing him to unmask as per lucha libre traditions. Los Traumas once again found themselves on opposite teams during an AULL event when they competed in a four team Relevos Suicidas, for the match Trauma I teamed up with Daga, Trauma II teamed with rival Iron Love with the teams of Chucho el Roto and Judas el Traidor and Flamita and Sadico rounding out the teams. Trauma II and Iron Love lost and were forced to wrestle under Lucha de Apuestas, or bet match, rules which meant that Trauma II had to unmask if he lost. Trauma II defeated Iron Love, who was then forced to have his hair shaved off as a result of the Luchas de Apuestas stipulation. He was one of nine wrestlers competing for the vacant Distrito Federal Welterweight Championship on March 4, 2012, but was eliminated from the Battle Royal as Astro Rey, Jr. won the title. On April 14, 2012, Los Traumas lost the AULL Tag Team Championship to Los Bastardos (Epitafio and Leviathan) on an AULL show in Tlalnepantla de Baz, State of Mexico. On June 17, 2012, Trauma II once again put his mask on the line in a three-way Luchas de Apuestas match against Oficial 911 and Shadow Phoenix. Oficial 911 escaped the match by pinning one of the other two, keeping his mask safe. In the end Trauma II pinned Shadow Phoenix, who was then forced to unmask and reveal his real name as per lucha libre traditions. Both Traumas were part of the 2012 El Castillo del Terror steel cage match, primarily through their developing rivalry with El Ángel. Both brothers escaped the cage without losing their mask. On November 3, 2012, Los Traumas defeated Astro de Plata and Freelance on a Lucha Libre AAA Worldwide (AAA) promoted show, marking the first time Los Traumas worked for Mexico's other major wrestling promotion. On February 17, 2013, Oficial 911 defeated El Ángel and Trauma II by count out, which meant that he would not be forced to put his mask on the line in a subsequent Luchas de Apuestas match, slated for March 3, 2013, while Trauma II and El Ángel would put their mask on the line. The decision was later reversed by the Mexico City wrestling commission due to the fact that 911 won by count out, he was put back in Luchas de Apuestas match. On the night 911 escaped with his mask safe, pining both Trauma II and El Ángel. In the end Trauma II pinned El Ángel even after Los Oficiales attacked both competitors. Following the match El Ángel removed his mask and gave it to Trauma II as a trophy of his victory. On March 31, 2013 Los Traumas competed in IWRG's La Guerra de Familias ("War of the Families") tournament. The team defeated La Familia de Tijuana (Mosco X-Fly and Eterno) in the first round. During the match Trauma I reaggravated an old knee injury and was not allowed to compete in the finals where Trauma II lost to Hijo de Máscara Año 2000 and Cien Caras, Jr. Following the loss Los Junior Dinamitas challenged Trauma I and Negro Navarro to defend their titles a week later. A week later Los Junior Dinamitas wrestled Trauma I and Negro Navarro for the IWRG Intercontinental Tag Team Championship, but lost. On August 9, 2015 Las Traumas and Negro Navarro won the IWRG Intercontinental Trios Championship from Los Piratas (Pirata Mogan, Pirata Morgan Jr. and El Hijo de Pirata Mogan). On April 24, 2016, Trauma II lost the IWRG Heavyweight Championship to Máscara Año 2000 Jr.

== In other media ==
The Trauma brothers have designed and sell their own line of T-shirts and sweatshirts manufactured by SidZero. The line of clothes was inspired by their ring looks and have been described as having the aesthetics of Slipknot combined with zombie movie posters. In 2012 the World Press Photo organization, based in Amsterdam, the Netherlands selected photographs of Los Traumas taken by polish photographer Tomasz Gudzowaty as the third-place winner in their sports category. The images were taken on June 15, 2011, before and during a wrestling event in Mexico City and featured black and white photos of Los Traumas wearing their trademark "horror-inspired" masks.

== Championships and accomplishments ==
- Alianza Universal de Lucha Libre

- AULL Tag Team Championship (1 time) – with Trauma I

- International Wrestling Revolution Group

- IWRG Intercontinental Heavyweight Championship (1 time)
- IWRG Intercontinental Lightweight Championship (1 time)
- IWRG Junior de Juniors Championship (1 time)
- IWRG Intercontinental Tag Team Championship (1 time) - with Trauma I
- IWRG Intercontinental Trios Championship (1 time) – with Negro Navarro and Trauma II
- Copa Higher Power (2010) – with Dr. Cerebro and El Hijo del Pantera
- Copa Higher Power (2012)

- The Crash Lucha Libre

- The Crash Tag Team Championship (1 time) – with Trauma I

- Toryumon Mexico

- Young Dragons Cup: 2009

== Lucha de Apuesta record ==
Winner (wager)	Loser (wager)	Location	Event	Date	Notes
Trauma II (mask)	Kidman (Note: Not to be mistaken for Billy Kidman.) (hair)	Unknown	Live event	Unknown	
Trauma II (mask)	Iron Love (hair)	Lopez Mateos, Baja California	Live event	January 29, 2012	(Note: Final team in a Ruleta de la Muerte and were forced to wrestle against each other.)
Trauma II (mask)	Shadow Phoenix (mask)	Naucalpan, Mexico State	IWRG show	June 17, 2012	(Note: Three way match for the mask that originally also included Oficial 911.)
Trauma II (mask)	El Ángel (mask)	Naucalpan, Mexico State	IWRG show	March 3, 2013	(Note: Three way match that also included Oficial 911.)
