= IWRG Rebelión de los Juniors =

International Wrestling Revolution Group event series

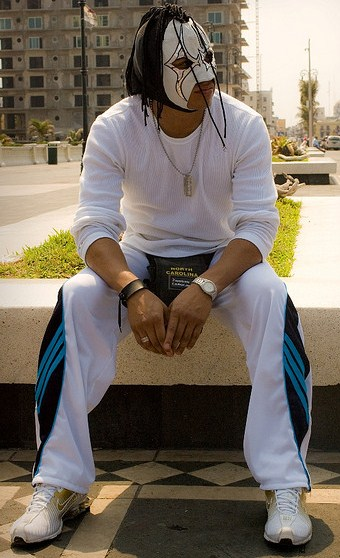
Trauma I, who won the IWRG Junior de Juniors Championship at the first Rebelión de los Juniors show.

Rebelión de los Juniors (Spanish for "The Junior Rebellion") is a major professional wrestling show held by the Mexican Lucha Libre promotion International Wrestling Revolution Group (IWRG) annually since its creation in 2011. The focal point of the show is always a multi-man elimination match either for the IWRG Junior de Juniors Championship or for the rights to challenge the championship at a later date. All participants in the main event match are supposed to be at least a second-generation wrestler. The Junior de Juniors Championship was won by Trauma I on the 2011 Rebelión de los Juniors show, all other shows have been for the #1 Contendership. IWRG has not announced a date for the 2016 Rebelión de los Juniors show yet.

== Event history ==
It has been a long-standing tradition in Lucha libre that family follows in the footstep of wrestlers, with a multitude of second-generation and in some instances third-generation (Note: On example is La Sombra who is the grandson of wrestler El Moro and son of Jose Andrade, better known as Brillante.) wrestlers active in the ring today. It is not uncommon for sons to take the ring name of their father, or a variation there of, such as the son of Santo wrestling as El Hijo del Santo, literally "The Son of Santo", or Perro Aguayo Jr., taking the ring name of his father Perro Aguayo. With a large number of Mexican wrestlers starting out as masked wrestlers where their real name and true background is not revealed it has allowed for a number of wrestlers to claim to be sons of famous wrestlers when they in actuality paid for the rights to use the name, such as Cien Caras Jr. and El Hijo de Cien Caras not being related to Cien Caras but instead paid for the privileges. Normally the "kayfabe" or storyline relationship is promoted as real until a wrestler is unmasked. With family playing such an important part of lucha libre the Mexican professional wrestling promotion International Wrestling Revolution Group (IWRG) that they hold several major events each year that plays off that family connection. IWRG regularly holds "family tournaments" such as Legado Final ("Final Legacy") or Guerra de Familias ("War of the Families").

Starting in 2011 IWRG has also regularly promoted a show called Rebelión de los Juniors ("The Junior Rebellion"), focusing specifically on second and third-generation wrestlers and normally tied to the IWRG Junior de Juniors Championship, with the main event either being for the championship or for the rights to challenge for the championship. IWRG has held a Rebelión de los Juniors five years in a row, with no specific date announced for a 2016 Rebelión de los Juniors show. A total of 87 wrestlers have participated in the five shows from 2011 through 2015 with Eterno and Golden Magic being the only wrestlers to have worked all shows so far. Golden Magic, Trauma I and Apolo Estrada Jr. have all wrestled in three Rebelión de los Juniors main events.

== Dates, venues, and main events ==
Event	Date	City	Venue	Main event	Ref.
2011	March 27, 2011	Naucalpan, Mexico State	Arena Naucalpan	El Hijo de L.A. Park (mask) vs. El Hijo de Pirata Morgan (C) vs. Trauma I (mask) Luchas de Apuestas match.	
2012	March 15, 2012	Naucalpan, Mexico State	Arena Naucalpan	Bestia 666 vs. Apolo Estrada Jr. vs. Carta Brava Jr. vs. El Canek Jr. vs. El Hijo de L.A. Park vs. El Hijo de Dr. Wagner Jr. vs. Halcón 78 Jr. vs. Hijo de Pirata Morgan vs. Máscara Sagrada Jr. vs. Ultraman, Jr.	
2013	May 9, 2013	Naucalpan, Mexico State	Arena Naucalpan	Carta Brava, Jr. vs. Hijo de Máscara Año 2000 vs. Apolo Estrada, Jr. vs. Freyser vs. Cien Caras, Jr. vs. El Hijo de Dr. Wagner vs. Super Nova vs. El Hijo del Pirata Morgan vs. Trauma I vs. Trauma II, 10-man elimination match to determine the number one contender for the IWRG Junior de Juniors Championship	
2014	February 16, 2014	Naucalpan, Mexico State	Arena Naucalpan	Super Nova vs. El Hijo de Dos Casas vs. El Hijo de Fishman vs. Freesero Jr. vs. Hijo de Máscara Año 2000 vs. Hijo de Pirata Morgan vs. Lizmark Jr. vs. Trauma I, #1 contender for the IWRG Junior de Juniors Championship, eight-man Battle Royal	
2015	March 1, 2015	Naucalpan, Mexico State	Arena Naucalpan	El Hijo de Dos Caras vs. Apolo Estrada Jr. vs. Danny Casas vs. Golden Magic vs. El Hijo del Diablo vs. Hijo del Máscara Año 2000 vs. Pirata Morgan Jr. vs. Universo 2000 Jr.	
2016	March 13, 2016	Naucalpan, Mexico State	Arena Naucalpan	Golden Magic, Máscara Sagrada and El Solar vs. Canis Lupus, Eterno and Trauma I	
2017	March 19, 2017	Naucalpan, Mexico State	Arena Naucalpan	10-man Rebelión de los Juniors tournament	
2018	March 18, 2018	Naucalpan, Mexico State	Arena Naucalpan	El Hijo del Alebrije vs. Apolo Estrada Jr. vs. Capo del Norte vs. El Diablo Jr. vs. Dr. Karonte vs. El Hijo del Medico Asesino vs. El Hijo del Pantera vs. El Hijo de Pirata Morgan vs. Lunatic Extreme vs. Mascara Magica Jr. vs. Hip Hop Man	
