= Rebelión de los Juniors (2016) =

2016 International Wrestling Revolution Group event

- Official poster showing the originally scheduled participants
- Promotion: International Wrestling Revolution Group
- Date: March 13, 2016
- City: Naucalpan, State of Mexico
- Venue: Arena Naucalpan

Event chronology
← Previous; El Protector	Next → Guerra del Golfo

Rebelión de los Juniors chronology
← Previous; 2015	Next → 2017

Rebelión de los Juniors (2016) (Spanish for "The Junior Rebellion") was an annual professional wrestling major event produced by Mexican professional wrestling promotion International Wrestling Revolution Group (IWRG), that took place on March 13, 2016 in Arena Naucalpan, Naucalpan, State of Mexico, Mexico. The focal point of the show was the Eponymous Rebelión de los Juniors tournament, an eight-man elimination match where all wrestlers were either second or third-generatoon wrestlers. The last surviving participant was rewarded by becoming the number one contender for the IWRG Junior de Juniors Championship held by Golden Magic at the time of the show.

The show featured a total of five matches and was covered by the "+LuchaTV" internet show as well as being taped for future IWRG television shows. The 2016 IWRG Rebelión de los Juniors was the sixth time IWRG has held a show under that name, starting in 2011.

== Production ==
=== Background ===
Professional wrestling has been a generational tradition in lucha libre since its inception early in the 20th century, with many second- or third-generation wrestlers following in the footsteps of their fathers or mothers. Several lucha libre promotions honor those traditions, often with annual tournaments such as Consejo Mundial de Lucha Libre's La Copa Junior. The Naucalpan, State of Mexico-based International Wrestling Revolution Group (IWRG) in 2011 created the IWRG Junior de Juniors Championship, a championship where only second- or third-generation wrestlers are allowed to wrestle for it. In addition to real-life second- or third-generation wrestlers there are a number of wrestlers who are presented as second- or third-generation wrestlers, normally masked wrestlers promoted as "Juniors". These wrestlers normally pay a royalty or fee for the use of the name, using the name of an established star to get attention from fans and promoters. Examples of such instances of fictional family relationships include Cien Caras Jr. who paid Cien Caras for the rights to use the name. In March 2011, only weeks after the creation of the Junior de Juniors Championship IWRG held their first IWRG Rebelión de los Juniors show, with the focal point being the Junior de Juniors Championship and "Junior" competitors. The Rebelión de los Juniors shows, as well as the majority of the IWRG shows in general, are held in "Arena Naucalpan", owned by the promoters of IWRG and their main arena. The 2016 show was the sixth year in a row that IWRG used the Rebelión de los Juniors name for a show.

=== Storylines ===
The event featured five professional wrestling matches with different wrestlers involved in pre-existing scripted feuds, plots and storylines. Wrestlers were portrayed as either heels (referred to as rudos in Mexico, those that portray the "bad guys") or faces (técnicos in Mexico, the "good guy" characters) as they followed a series of tension-building events, which culminated in a wrestling match or series of matches.

The third match of the show was part of a long running storyline between two different IWRG factions as rivals Cerebro Negro and El Hijo del Diablo. On January 31, 2016 Hijo del Diablo, Diablo Jr. I and Imposible (collectively known as Los Mariachis Locos) defeated Cerebro Negro, Dr. Cerebro and Black Terry (collectively known as Los Terrible Cerebros, "The Terrible Brains") to win the Distrito Federal Trios Championship. In the weeks since the title change both sides had made challenges, especially Lucha de Apuestas, or "bet match" challenges, towards each other.

== Family relationship ==
Wrestler	Family	Relationship
Danny Casas	3rd Generation Casas	Unclear
Apolo Estrada Jr.	Apolo Estrada	Father
El Hijo de Dos Caras	Dos Caras	Father
Diablo Jr. I	El Hijo del Diablo	Father
El Hijo del Alebrije	Alebrije / Kraneo	Father
El Hijo del Solar	El Solar	Father
Máscara Año 2000 Jr.	Máscara Año 2000	Storyline Father
Máscara Sagrada	Máscara Sagrada Jr.	Father
Matrix Jr.	Bombero Infernal	Father
Picudo Jr.	Picudo	Father

== Event ==
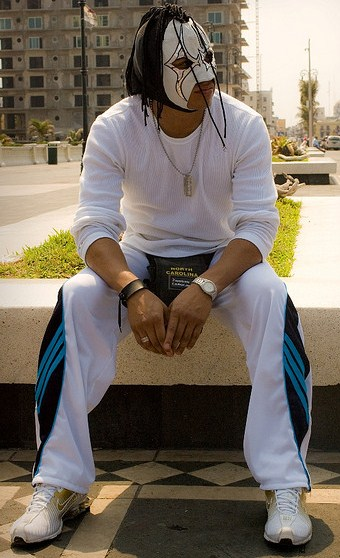
Trauma I, who was on the losing team in the main event.

Trauma II and Super Nova were both scheduled to compete in the 2016 Rebelión de los Juniors tournament, but neither man were on the show. Super Nova had suffered an injury in February and was unable to compete in the tournament. A week prior to the show, after the matches had been announced, a former girlfriend publicly accused Trauma II of kidnapping and raping her. On the night Trauma II did not wrestle, although it was unclear if it was Trauma II's choice or IWRG's choice to not be on the show. To fill the two empty spots in the tournament Matrix Jr. and Picudo Jr., who worked the first match of the night had were added to the tournament.

Following his victory over El Hijo del Diablo, Cerbro Negro challenged El Hijo del Diablo to put his hair on the line in a Lucha de Apuestas between the two. The Rebelión de los Juniors match saw all ten wrestlers in the ring at the same time in a match fought under elimination rules. At times wrestlers fought outside the ring and used objects such as steel chairs without being disqualified. The first man eliminated was El Hijo del Alebrije as he was pinned by Hijo de Dos Caras and Apolo Estrada Jr. The remaining order of elimination was: Matrix Jr., Máscara Sagrada Jr., Hijo del Solar, Picudo Jr., Diablo Jr. I and Apolo Estrada Jr. leaving Danny Casas, El Hijo del Máscara Año 2000 and El Hijo de Dos Caras in the ring. At that point in time, El Hijo de Máscara Año 2000 pulled his mask off to reveal that he was actually Máscara Año 2000 Jr., a long-time rival of Hijo de Dos Caras. Moments later he was able to use the element of surprise to eliminate El Hijo de Dos Caras. In the end, Danny Casas pinned Máscara Año 2000 Jr., earning a match for the IWRG Junior de Juniors Championship. Following the main event, where Golden Magic, Máscara Sagrada and El Solar defeated Canis Lupus, Eterno and Trauma I, Danny Casas came to the ring to challenge Golden Magic to put the Junior de Juniors championship against him.

=== Results ===
No.	Results	Stipulations
1	Dragón Fly and Kanon defeated Matrix Jr. and Picudo Jr.	tag team match
2	Diva Salvaje, Miss Gaviota and Pasion Kristal defeated Artillero, Dr. Cerebro and Metralla	Best two-out-of-three falls six-man "Lucha Libre rules" tag team match
3	Cerebro Negro defeated El Hijo del Diablo	Best two-out-of-three falls match
4	Danny Casas defeated Máscara Año 2000 Jr., El Hijo de Dos Caras, Apolo Estrada Jr., Diablo Jr. I, Picudo Jr., El Hijo del Solar, Máscara Sagrada Jr., Matrix Jr. and El Hijo del Alebrije	#1 contender for the IWRG Junior de Juniors Championship, eight-man elimination match
5	Golden Magic, Máscara Sagrada and El Solar defeated Canis Lupus, Eterno and Trauma I	Best two-out-of-three falls six-man "Lucha Libre rules" tag team match
