= Rebelión de los Juniors (2012) =

2012 International Wrestling Revolution Group event

- Official poster of the event
- Promotion: International Wrestling Revolution Group
- Date: March 15, 2012
- City: Naucalpan, State of Mexico
- Venue: Arena Naucalpan

Event chronology
← Previous; IWRG Contra Restos de la Empresas	Next → Guerra de Familias

Rebelión de los Juniors chronology
← Previous; 2011	Next → 2013

Rebelión de los Juniors (2012) (Spanish for "The Junior Rebellion") was an annual professional wrestling major event produced by Mexican professional wrestling promotion International Wrestling Revolution Group (IWRG), which took place on March 15, 2012 in Arena Naucalpan, Naucalpan, State of Mexico, Mexico. The main event of the match was a 10-man elimination match featuring 10 "Juniors" with the last surviving participant becoming the #1 contender for the IWRG Junior de Juniors Championship held by Trauma I at the time. The ten competitors were Bestia 666 (son of Damian 666), Carta Brava, Jr. (son of Carta Brava, may be a fictional relationship), El Canek, Jr. (son of El Canek), Apolo Estrada, Jr. (son of Apolo Estrada), Halcón 78, Jr. (Son of Halcón 78), El Hijo de L.A. Park (son of L.A. Park), Hijo de Pirata Morgan (son of Pirata Morgan), El Hijo de Dr. Wagner, Jr. (son of Dr. Wagner, Jr.), Máscara Sagrada, Jr. (son of Máscara Sagrada) and Ultraman, Jr. (son of Ultraman). The main event came down to just Bestia 666 and Hijo de Pirata Morgan left in the ring. During the match the referee was knocked down, which allowed La Familia de Tijuana remembers Damian 666, Halloween, Super Nova and Zumbi to come to the ring to attack Hijo de Pirata Morgan, allowing Bestia 666 to pin his opponents only moments later.

== Production ==
=== Background ===
professional wrestling has been a generational tradition in Lucha libre since its inception early in the 20th century, with a great deal of second or third-generation wrestlers following in the footsteps of their fathers or mothers. Several lucha libre promotions honor those traditions, often with annual tournaments such as Consejo Mundial de Lucha Libre's La Copa Junior. The Naucalpan, State of Mexico based International Wrestling Revolution Group (IWRG) created the IWRG Junior de Juniors Championship in 2011, a championship where only second or third-generation wrestlers are allowed to challenge for it. In addition to legitimate second-generation wrestlers there are a number of wrestlers who are presented as second or third-generation wrestlers, normally masked wrestlers promoted as "Juniors". These wrestlers normally pay a royalty or fee for the use of the name, using the name of an established star to get attention from fans and promoters. Examples of such instances of fictional family relationships include Arturo Beristain, also known as El Hijo del Gladiador ("The Son of El Gladiador") who was not related to the original El Gladiador, or El Hijo de Cien Caras who paid Cien Caras for the rights to use the name. Weeks after the creation of the Junior de Juniors Championship IWRG held their first IWRG Rebelión de los Juniors show with the centerpiece of the show being the Junior de Juniors Championship. The Rebelión de los Juniors shows, as well as the majority of the IWRG shows in general, are held in "Arena Naucalpan", owned by the promoters of IWRG and their main arena. The 2012 show was the second year in a row that IWRG used the Rebelión de los Juniors name for a show

=== Storylines ===
The event featured five professional wrestling matches with different wrestlers involved in pre-existing scripted feuds, plots and storylines. Wrestlers were portrayed as either heels (referred to as rudos in Mexico, those that portray the "bad guys") or faces (técnicos in Mexico, the "good guy" characters) as they followed a series of tension-building events, which culminated in a wrestling match or series of matches.

== Family relationships ==
Wrestler	Family	Relationship
Bestia 666	Damián 666	Father
El Canek, Jr.	El Canek	Father
Carta Brava, Jr.	Carta Brava	Father
Apolo Estrada, Jr.	Apolo Estrada	Father
Halcón 78, Jr.	Halcón 78	Father
El Hijo de L.A. Park	L.A. Park	Father
El Hijo de Dr. Wagner Jr.	Dr. Wagner Jr.	Father
Hijo de Pirata Morgan	Pirata Morgan	Father
Máscara Sagrada, Jr.	Máscara Sagrada	Father
Ultraman, Jr.	Ultraman	Father

== Results ==
No.	Results	Stipulations
1	Los Astros (Astro de Plata and Astro Rey, Jr.) defeated Pacto Negro and Polifacetico	Tag team best two-out-of-three falls tag team match
2	Charly Madrid and Chicano defeated Comando Negro and The Mummy – two falls to one	Tag team best two-out-of-three falls tag team match
3	Dinamic Black, Golden Magic and Mike Segura defeated Acero, El Aleman and Imposible – two falls to one	Best two-out-of-three falls six-man tag team match
4	Freeyser and Los Traumas (Trauma I and Trauma II) defeated Alan Extreme, Eterno and Violento Jack – two falls to one	Best two-out-of-three falls six-man tag team match
5	Bestia 666 defeated Apolo Estrada, Jr., Carta Brava, Jr., El Canek, Jr., El Hijo de L.A. Park, El Hijo de Dr. Wagner, Jr., Halcón 78, Jr., Hijo de Pirata Morgan, Máscara Sagrada, Jr. and Ultraman, Jr.	#1 contender for the IWRG Junior de Juniors Championship, 10-man elimination match

Order of elimination

#	Eliminated	Eliminated by	Time
1	Ultraman, Jr.		
2	Apolo Estrada, Jr.		
3	Halcon 78, Jr.		
4	Carta Brava, Jr.		
5	El Canek, Jr.		
6	Máscara Sagrada, Jr.		
7	El Hijo de Dr. Wagner, Jr.	El Hijo de L.A. Park	
8	El Hijo de L.A. Park	Bestia 666 and Hijo de Pirata Morgan	
9	Hijo de Pirata Morgan	Bestia 666	
10	Winner	Bestia 666	

== Aftermath ==
Bestia 666 defeated Trauma I to win the IWRG Junior de Juniors Championship only one week later on March 22, 2012. He held the Junior de Juniors championship until July 1, 2012 where he lost it to Hijo de Máscara Año 2000.
