= IWRG Junior de Juniors =

2011 International Wrestling Revolution Group event

- Official poster for the event
- Promotion: International Wrestling Revolution Group
- Date: February 6, 2011
- City: Naucalpan, State of Mexico
- Venue: Arena Naucalpan

Event chronology
| ← Previous; Caravana de Campeones (January 2011) | Next → La Jaula del Honor |

IWRG Junior de Juniors (Spanish for "IWRG Junior Juniors") was a major professional wrestling show produced and scripted by the Mexican Lucha libre promotion International Wrestling Revolution Group (IWRG) on February 6, 2011. The event was held in Arena Naucalpan, IWRG's home arena and the venue for the majority of their shows.

The focal point of the event was a tournament to determine the first ever holder of the IWRG Junior de Juniors Championship, a championship specifically for second or third-generation luchadors. Bestia 666, Bobby Lee Jr., Carta Brava Jr., El Hijo de L.A. Park, El Hijo del Canek, El Hijo del Máscara Año 2000, El Hijo del Pirata Morgan, Kung Fu Jr., Trauma I and Ultramán Jr. – all second-generation wrestlers – competed in the tournament which saw El Hijo del Pirata Morgan defeated El Hijo de L.A. Park in the finals to become the first IWRG Junior de Juniors champion. Beyond the 10 tournament matches the show included four additional matches.

== Production ==
=== Background ===
Professional wrestling has been a generational tradition in lucha libre since its inception early in the 20th century, with many second- or third-generation wrestlers following in the footsteps of their fathers or mothers. Several lucha libre promotions honor those traditions, often with annual tournaments such as Consejo Mundial de Lucha Libre's La Copa Junior. The Naucalpan, State of Mexico-based International Wrestling Revolution Group (IWRG) in 2011 created the IWRG Junior de Juniors Championship, a championship where only second- or third-generation wrestlers are allowed to wrestle for it. In addition to real-life second- or third-generation wrestlers there are a number of wrestlers who are presented as second- or third-generation wrestlers, normally masked wrestlers promoted as "Juniors". These wrestlers normally pay a royalty or fee for the use of the name, using the name of an established star to get attention from fans and promoters. Examples of such instances of fictional family relationships include Cien Caras Jr. who paid Cien Caras for the rights to use the name. The Junior de Juniors shows, as well as the majority of the IWRG shows in general was held in "Arena Naucalpan", owned by the promoters of IWRG and their main arena.

=== Storylines ===
The event featured fourteen professional wrestling matches with different wrestlers involved in pre-existing scripted feuds, plots and storylines. Wrestlers were portrayed as either heels (referred to as rudos in Mexico, those that portray the "bad guys") or faces (técnicos in Mexico, the "good guy" characters) as they followed a series of tension-building events, which culminated in a wrestling match or series of matches.

== Event ==
The opening match of the show was a best two-out-of-three-falls match between tecnico Guizmo and rudo Guerrero 2000, which Guizmo won in two straight falls. In the second match of the night, a Best two-out-of-three-falls tag team match, the team of Alan Extreme and Dinamic Black defeated El Imposible and Keshin Black by count out as the rudo team was not able to return to the ring in time. The third match of the night, a traditional lucha libre best two-out-of-three falls six-man tag team match, the rudo wrestlers Cerebro Negro and Dr. Cerebro were teamed up with the técnico Multifacético for the event and worked together as a team without much friction. The team defeated Bombero Infernal, Comando Negro and Hammer by disqualification when Comando Negro pulled Multifacético mask off in view of the referee. In the last non-tournament match Headhunter A made a surprise appearance, teaming with Ángel Mortal and Gran Apache to take on the veteran team of Black Terry, El Brazo and Negro Navarro. The match itself was less of a wrestling match and more of a fight as Headhunter A brought a fork with him to the ring and used it to draw blood from his opponents. By the end of the match Black Terry, El Brazo and Negro Navarro won by disqualification when the referee finally saw Headhunter A use the fork on his opponents.

With ten second-generation wrestlers in the tournament IWRG could not hold a standard elimination tournament, instead they started the tournament with a battle royal elimination match where the last two wrestlers would earn a first and second round bye and move straight to the semi-finals instead. El Hijo del Pirata Morgan and Trauma I won the match and thus were allowed to skip the first two rounds. In first round matches El Hijo de Mascara Ano 2000 defeated Bobby Lee Jr., Ultraman Jr. defeated El Hijo del Canek, Bestia 666 defeated Kung Fu Jr. and El Hijo de LA Park defeats Carta Brava Jr. to qualify for the quarter-finals of the tournament. In the quarter-finals, Hijo de Mascara Ano 2000 and El Hijo de L.A. Park won their matches and moved on in the tournament. After sitting out for two rounds El Hijo del Pirata Morgan defeated Trauma I to qualify for the finals while El Hijo de L.A. Park won his match as well. In the finals El Hijo de L.A. Park landed a foul kick on El Hijo del Pirata Morgan behind the referee's back but El Hijo del Pirata Morgan overcame the disadvantage to pin El Hijo de L.A. Park and win the IWRG Junior de Juniors Championship.

== Aftermath ==
In March 2011, only weeks after the creation of the Junior de Juniors Championship IWRG held their first IWRG Rebelión de los Juniors ("Junior Rebellion") show, with the focal point being the Junior de Juniors Championship and "Junior" competitors. From 2011 forward the Rebelión de los Juniors show became an annual show, normally held early in the year, with a tournament to determine the number one contender for the IWRG Junior de Juniors Championship.

El Hijo del Pirata Morgan's reign as the first IWRG Junior de Juniors Champion only lasted 49 days, ending on March 27, 2011 as he lost the title to Trauma I in the main event of the 2011 Rebelión de los Juniors in a match that also included Junior de Junior finalist El Hijo de L.A. Park in a mask where both Trauma I and El Hijo de L.A. Park put their masks on the line against the championship.

== Results ==
| No. | Results | Stipulations |
|---|---|---|
| 1 | Guizmo defeated Guerrero 2000 | Best two-out-of-three-falls match |
| 2 | Alan Extreme and Dinamic Black defeated El Imposible and Keshin Black by count out | Best two-out-of-three-falls tag team match |
| 3 | Cerebro Negro, Dr. Cerebro and Multifacético defeated Bombero Infernal, Comando Negro and Hammer by disqualification | Best two-out-of-three falls six-man tag team match |
| 4 | Black Terry, El Brazo and Negro Navarro defeated Headhunter A, Ángel Mortal and Gran Apache by disqualification | Best two-out-of-three falls six-man tag team match |
| 5 | El Hijo del Pirata Morgan and Trauma I defeated Bestia 666, Bobby Lee Jr., Carta Brava Jr., El Hijo de L.A. Park, El Hijo del Canek, El Hijo del Máscara Año 2000, Kung Fu Jr. and Ultramán Jr. | IWRG Junior de Juniors Championship tournament, Seeding battle royal |
| 6 | El Hijo del Máscara Año 2000 defeated Bobby Lee Jr. | IWRG Junior de Juniors Championship tournament round 1 match |
| 7 | Ultramán Jr. defeated El Hijo del Canek | IWRG Junior de Juniors Championship tournament round 1 match |
| 8 | Bestia 666 defeated Kung Fu Jr. | IWRG Junior de Juniors Championship tournament round 1 match |
| 9 | El Hijo de L.A. Park defeated Carta Brava Jr. | IWRG Junior de Juniors Championship tournament round 1 match |
| 10 | El Hijo del Máscara Año 2000 defeated Ultramán Jr. | IWRG Junior de Juniors Championship tournament quarter final match |
| 11 | El Hijo de L.A. Park defeated Bestia 666 | IWRG Junior de Juniors Championship tournament quarter final match |
| 12 | El Hijo del Pirata Morgan defeated Trauma I | IWRG Junior de Juniors Championship tournament semi-final match |
| 13 | El Hijo de L.A. Park defeated El Hijo del Máscara Año 2000 | IWRG Junior de Juniors Championship tournament semi-final match |
| 14 | El Hijo del Pirata Morgan defeated El Hijo de L.A. Park | IWRG Junior de Juniors Championship tournament final match |
