= Rebelión de los Juniors (2013) =

2013 International Wrestling Revolution Group event

- Official poster of the event.
- Promotion: International Wrestling Revolution Group
- Date: May 9, 2013
- City: Naucalpan, State of Mexico
- Venue: Arena Naucalpan

Event chronology
← Previous; Guerra del Golfo	Next → Rey del Ring

Rebelión de los Juniors chronology
← Previous; 2012	Next → 2014

Rebelión de los Juniors (2013) (Spanish for "The Junior Rebellion") was an annual professional wrestling major event produced by Mexican professional wrestling promotion International Wrestling Revolution Group (IWRG), that took place on May 9, 2013 in Arena Naucalpan, Naucalpan, State of Mexico, Mexico. The main event of the show was a 10-man elimination match featuring 10 "Juniors" with the last surviving participant becoming the number one contender for the IWRG Junior de Juniors Championship held by Oficial Factor at the time. The ten competitors were Trauma I, Hijo de Máscara Año 2000, Apolo Estrada, Jr., Freyser, Cien Caras, Jr., El Hijo de Dr. Wagner, Super Nova, Carta Brava, Jr., El Hijo del Pirata Morgan, and Trauma II. The show featured four additional matches.

== Production ==
=== Background ===
Professional wrestling has been a generational tradition in Lucha libre since its inception early in the 20th century, with a great deal of second or third-generation wrestlers following in the footsteps of their fathers or mothers. Several lucha libre promotions honor those traditions, often with annual tournaments such as Consejo Mundial de Lucha Libre's La Copa Junior. The Naucalpan, State of Mexico based International Wrestling Revolution Group (IWRG) created the IWRG Junior de Juniors Championship in 2011, a championship where only second or third-generation wrestlers are allowed to challenge for it. In addition to legitimate second-generation wrestlers there are a number of wrestlers who are presented as second or third-generation wrestlers, normally masked wrestlers promoted as "Juniors". These wrestlers normally pay a royalty or fee for the use of the name, using the name of an established star to get attention from fans and promoters. Examples of such instances of fictional family relationships include Arturo Beristain, also known as El Hijo del Gladiador ("The Son of El Gladiador) who was not related to the original El Gladiador, or El Hijo de Cien Caras who paid Cien Caras for the rights to use the name. Weeks after the creation of the Junior de Juniors Championship IWRG held their first IWRG Rebelión de los Juniors show with the centerpiece of the show being the Junior de Juniors Championship. The Rebelión de los Juniors shows, as well as the majority of the IWRG shows in general, are held in "Arena Naucalpan", owned by the promoters of IWRG and their main arena. The 2013 show was the third year in a row that IWRG used the Rebelión de los Juniors name for a show

=== Storylines ===
The event featured five professional wrestling matches with different wrestlers involved in pre-existing scripted feuds, plots and storylines. Wrestlers were portrayed as either heels (referred to as rudos in Mexico, those that portray the "bad guys") or faces (técnicos in Mexico, the "good guy" characters) as they followed a series of tension-building events, which culminated in a wrestling match or series of matches.

== Family relationship ==
Wrestler	Family	Relationship
Carta Brava, Jr.	Carta Brava	Father
Cien Caras, Jr.	Cien Caras	Storyline father
Apolo Estrada, Jr.	Apolo Estrada	Father
Freyser	Fresero	Father
El Hijo de Dr. Wagner	Dr. Wagner, Jr.	Father
Hijo de Máscara Año 2000	Máscara Año 2000	Father
El Hijo del Pirata Morgan	Pirata Morgan	Father
Super Nova	El Texano	Father
Trauma I	Negro Navarro	Father
Trauma II	Negro Navarro	Father

== Results ==
No.	Results	Stipulations
1	Fulgor defeated Chris Star	Singles match
2	Imposible and Alan Extreme defeated Seiya and Saurman	Two out of three falls tag team match
3	Los Comandos Elite (Factor, Rayan and Spartan) defeated Los Revolucionarios (Dinamic Black, Golden Magic and Centvrión)	Two out of three falls six-man tag team match
4	Danny Casas, Eterno and Mosco X-Fly defeated Chico Che, Dr. Cerebro and Toscano	Two out of three falls six-man tag team match
5	Carta Brava, Jr. defeated Hijo de Máscara Año 2000, Apolo Estrada, Jr., Freyser, Cien Caras, Jr., El Hijo de Dr. Wagner, Super Nova, vs. El Hijo del Pirata Morgan, Trauma I and Trauma II	10-man elimination match to determine the number one contender for the IWRG Junior de Juniors Championship
