= El Hijo de Dos Caras =

Mexican professional wrestler

Personal information
- Born: Guillermo Rodríguez Chucuan; April 26, 1988 (age 38) San Luis Potosi, San Luis Potosi, Mexico
- Family: Dos Caras (father); Alberto El Patrón (brother); Mil Máscaras (uncle); Sicodelico (uncle); Sicodelico, Jr. (cousin); El Hijo del Sicodelico (cousin)

Professional wrestling career
- Ring name(s): Dark Phoenix; Memo Montenegro; El Hijo de Dos Caras
- Billed height: 185 cm (6 ft 1 in)
- Billed weight: 106 kg (234 lb)
- Trained by: Pablo Marquez
- Debut: 2012

Guillermo Rodríguez Chucuan (born April 26, 1988) is a Mexican professional wrestler, currently working for the Mexican promotion International Wrestling Revolution Group (IWRG) portraying a tecnico ("Good guy") wrestling character. He is best known under his current ring name El Hijo de Dos Caras, Spanish for "The son of Two Face", a reference to the fact that Rodríguez is the son of professional wrestler José Luis Rodríguez, better known as Dos Caras. He has previously worked for WWE, on their NXT brand as Memo Montenegro. He is a two-time, former IWRG Intercontinental Heavyweight Champion, former IWRG Rey del Ring Champion and current IWRG Junior de Juniors Champion.

== Early life ==
Guillermo Rodríguez was born on June 26, 1988, in San Luis Potosi, San Luis Potosi, Mexico, son of José Luis Rodríguez Arellano, a Mexican professional wrestler best known under the ring name Dos Caras. He is the younger brother of former WWE Champion and former Impact Wrestling Champion José Alberto Rodríguez, better known under the ring names Dos Caras Jr., Alberto Del Rio, and most recently Alberto El Patrón. He is the nephew of professional wrestler Mil Máscaras and Sicodelico and the cousin of Sicodelico Jr. and Hijo de Sicodelico. While there are instances of wrestlers paying to be a "junior", Rodríguez is the son of Dos Caras, a fact that has been confirmed early on in his career.

== Professional wrestling career ==
Rodríguez initially worked as an masked wrestler, known as "Dark Phoenix", wearing a modified version of his father's two-headed eagle mask. It is traditional to keep the true identify of a masked wrestler a secret, not revealing their real names and oftentimes not revealing what previous ring names they have competed under, which make it possible that Rodríguez made his debut prior to 2012 under a different ring name.

=== Memo Montenegro (2012–2013) ===
In 2012 it was announced that Rodríguez had signed with WWE, joining his other brother Alberto as he began training in NXT. He was given the ring name "Memo Montenegro" and worked unmasked. He made his in-ring debut on episode 21 of NXT from Full Sail University, losing in just 21 seconds to Big E Langston. Three episodes later Montenegro lost to Xavier Woods in short order once again. He remained with NXT until early 2013 when he was released from his contract at his own request.

=== Hijo de Dos Caras (2013–present) ===
Upon his return to Mexico he began working as "El Hijo de Dos Caras" ("The Son of Dos Caras"), wearing a mask that closely resembled the mask his father has work through his entire career. His first appearances in Mexico saw him working for the World Wrestling League (WWL), teaming with his uncle Mil Máscaras and his cousin Sicodelico Jr. to defeat the trio of Cien Caras Jr., Máscara Año 2000 and Universo 2000 on two WWL shows

In early 2014 he began working for International Wrestling Revolution Group (IWRG) as a tecnico, or a "good guy" character. On February 2, 2014, he teamed up with Centvrión for IWRG's annual El Protector, but lost in the first round to the team of Anubis Black and Pirata Morgan. His next major appearance was at the 2014 Rebelión de los Juniors, where he was eliminated in the main event by eventual tournament winner Super Nova. During the summer of 2014 Hijo de Dos Caras began a feud with Hijo de Máscara Año 2000, initially over the IWRG Rey del Ring Championship, which Hijo de Máscara Año 2000 successfully defended on July 6. A few weeks later, Hijo de Dos Caras faced off against Demon Clown, Dr. Wagner Jr., L.A. Park, Máscara Sagrada and Pirata Morgan in a Ladder match for the vacant IWRG Intercontinental Heavyweight Championship. During the match the actual ladder broke, forcing Máscara Sagrada to improvise by holding a different ladder stable so El Hijo de Dos Caras could climb the ladder to win the match and the championship.

The following month, he challenged Hijo de Máscara Año 2000 for the Rey del Ring Championship, but Hijo de Máscara Año 2000 was able to win the match once again. On August 31, 2014, IWRG held a major show called La Isla ("The Island") with Hijo de Dos Caras, Demon Clown, Oficial AK-47, Dr. Wagner Jr., Hijo de Máscara Año 2000, L.A Park, Trauma I and Veneno, competing in a ladder match where the prize, according to the storyline, was 50,000 Mexican pesos in a bag. During the match, Demon Clown attacked Hijo de Dos Caras with the ladder on several occasions until Demon Clown was able to climb the ladder and grab the bag of money. Following the ladder match, Hijo de Dos Caras successfully defended the IWRG Intercontinental Heavyweight Championship against Demon Clown only a week after La Isla.

On October 5, 2015, Hijo de Dos Casas finally won the IWRG Rey del Ring Championship, defeating Hijo de Máscara Año 2000 in a championship vs. championship match. At the 2014 El Castillo del Terror ("The Castle of Fear") show Hijo de Dos Caras successfully defended the Heavyweight Championship against Cien Caras Jr., the regular tag team partner of Hijo de Máscara Año 2000. His run as a double IWRG champion ended on January 11, 2015, when Hijo de Máscara Año 2000 regained the title in a match where only the IWRG Rey del Ring Championship was on the line.

While he worked for IWRG on a regular basis, he was not exclusively signed to the company, working several shows on the independent circuit in Mexico, including an appearance for Universal Wrestling Entertainment (UWE). At a UWE show on January 31, 2015, Hijo de Dos Caras and El Hijo de Dr. Wagner Jr. defeated Hijo de L.A. Park and El Hijo de Pirata Morgan and Los Traumas (Trauma I and Trauma II) to win the vacant UWE Tag Team Championship. On February 15, 2015, he competed in that year's version of the El Protector tournament, teaming up with rookie Emperador Azteca, only to lose in the first round to Pirata Morgan and rookie Anubis Black. Two weeks later, he became the #1 contender for the IWRG Junior de Juniors Championship, as he outlasted Apolo Estrada Jr., Danny Casas, El Hijo del Diablo, Golden Magic, Hijo de Mascara Ano 2000, Pirata Morgan Jr., and Universo 2000 Jr. in the main event of the 2015 Rebelión de los Juniors show. On March 22 he successfully defended the heavyweight championship against Pirata Morgan.

On April 12 he was once again successful in defending the IWRG Intercontinental Heavyweight Championship, this time defeating veteran wrestler Negro Navarro. The two would cross paths again during the main event of IWRG's Guerra Revolucionaria show, which was won by Hijo de Máscara Año 2000. After that match, Hijo de Máscara Año 2000 laid out another challenge to Hijo de Dos Caras to put the IWRG Intercontinental Heavyweight Championship on the line against him, a challenge Hijo de Dos Caras did not respond to at the time. The two rivals faced off once again in the 2015 Guerra de Familias tournament on July 5, 2015, when the team of Hijo de Dos Caras and Super Nova defeated Hijo de Máscara Año 2000 and Universo 2000 Jr. The duo would lose in the second round to eventual tournament winners Los Crazy Americans (Coloso Chris and Principe Orion). On October 11, 2015, he lost the IWRG Intercontinental Heavyweight Championship against Máscara Año 2000 Jr. However, he regained the title on November 1, 2015. On February 14, 2016, Hijo de Dos Caras lost the Heavyweight championship to Trauma I in a match that also included Herodes Jr. In the summer of 2016, July 17, El Hijo de Dos Caras defeated Danny Casas to win the IWRG Junior de Juniors championship.

==== Global Force Wrestling (2017) ====
El Hijo del Dos Caras, along with his father, appeared at Impact Wrestling's Slammiversary XV event in the corner of Alberto El Patron, as Alberto defeated Bobby Lashley to unify the Impact Wrestling World Heavyweight Championship and GFW Global Championship.

== Championships and accomplishments ==
- Allied Independent Wrestling Federation
  - AIWF Latin American Championship (1 time, current)
- International Wrestling Revolution Group
  - IWRG Intercontinental Heavyweight Championship (2 times)
  - IWRG Junior de Juniors Championship (1 time)
  - IWRG Rey del Ring Championship (1 time)
  - Rebelion De Los Juniors Tournament: 2015
- Univerasal Wrestling Entertainment
  - UWE World Tag Team Championship (1 time) – with El Hijo de Dr. Wagner Jr.
- Wrestling Martin Calderon
  - WMC Tag Team Championship (1 time) – with El Hijo de Fishman

== Lucha de Apuesta record ==
Winner (wager)	Loser (wager)	Location	Event	Date	Notes
Trauma I (mask)	Hijo de Dos Caras (Championship)	Naucalpan, Mexico State	IWRG show	February 14, 2016	(Note: This was a three-way match that also included Herodes Jr., Hijo de Dos Caras risked his championship, Trauma I his mask and Herodes Jr. his hair.)
