= Rebelión de los Juniors (2015) =

2018 International Wrestling Revolution Group event

- Official poster showing all eight main event competitors
- Promotion: International Wrestling Revolution Group
- Date: March 1, 2015
- City: Naucalpan, State of Mexico
- Venue: Arena Naucalpan

Event chronology
← Previous; El Protector	Next → Guerra del Golfo

Rebelión de los Juniors chronology
← Previous; 2014	Next → 2016

Rebelión de los Juniors (2015) (Spanish for "The Junior Rebellion") was an annual professional wrestling major event produced by Mexican professional wrestling promotion International Wrestling Revolution Group (IWRG), that took place on March 1, 2015 in Arena Naucalpan, Naucalpan, State of Mexico, Mexico. The main event of the show was an eight-man elimination match featuring eight "Juniors" with the last surviving participant becoming the number one contender for the IWRG Junior de Juniors Championship held by Super Nova at the time.

== Production ==
=== Background ===
Professional wrestling has been a generational tradition in Lucha libre since its inception early in the 20th century, with a great deal of second or third-generation wrestlers following in the footsteps of their fathers or mothers. Several lucha libre promotions honor those traditions, often with annual tournaments such as Consejo Mundial de Lucha Libre's La Copa Junior. The Naucalpan, State of Mexico based International Wrestling Revolution Group (IWRG) created the IWRG Junior de Juniors Championship in 2011, a championship where only second or third-generation wrestlers are allowed to challenge for it. In addition to legitimate second-generation wrestlers there are a number of wrestlers who are presented as second or third-generation wrestlers, normally masked wrestlers promoted as "Juniors". These wrestlers normally pay a royalty or fee for the use of the name, using the name of an established star to get attention from fans and promoters. Examples of such instances of fictional family relationships include Arturo Beristain, also known as El Hijo del Gladiador ("The Son of El Gladiador) who was not related to the original El Gladiador, or El Hijo de Cien Caras who paid Cien Caras for the rights to use the name. Weeks after the creation of the Junior de Juniors Championship IWRG held their first IWRG Rebelión de los Juniors show with the centerpiece of the show being the Junior de Juniors Championship. The Rebelión de los Juniors shows, as well as the majority of the IWRG shows in general, are held in "Arena Naucalpan", owned by the promoters of IWRG and their main arena. The 2015 show was the fifth year in a row that IWRG used the Rebelión de los Juniors name for a show

=== Storylines ===
The event featured five professional wrestling matches with different wrestlers involved in pre-existing scripted feuds, plots and storylines. Wrestlers were portrayed as either heels (referred to as rudos in Mexico, those that portray the "bad guys") or faces (técnicos in Mexico, the "good guy" characters) as they followed a series of tension-building events, which culminated in a wrestling match or series of matches.

== Family relationship ==
Wrestler	Family	Relationship
Danny Casas	3rd Generation Casas	Unclear
Apolo Estrada Jr.	Apolo Estrada	Father
Golden Magic	Mr. Magia	Father
El Hijo del Diablo	None	his name means "Son of the Devil", but is not related to anyone who worked as "El Diablo"
El Hijo de Dos Caras	Dos Caras	Father
Hijo del Máscara Año 2000	Máscara Año 2000	Father
Pirata Morgan Jr.	Pirata Morgan	Father
Universo 2000 Jr.	Universo 2000	Father

== Results ==
No.	Results	Stipulations
1	Mini Cobra and Mini Multifacético defeated Demon Rock and Espectrito	Best two-out-of-three falls tag team match
2	Electro Boy, El Hijo del Alebrije and Kamilion defeated Black Fury, Dragón Celestial and Miss Gaviota	Best two-out-of-three falls six-man "Lucha Libre rules" tag team match
3	Comando Elite (Liderk, Rayan and Spector) defeated La Corporación (Cerebro Negro, Dr. Cerebro and Veneno)	Best two-out-of-three falls six-man "Lucha Libre rules" tag team match
4	Chicano, Relámpago and Súper Nova defeated Canis Lupus, Eterno and Tony Rivera	Best two-out-of-three falls six-man "Lucha Libre rules" tag team match
5	El Hijo de Dos Caras defeated Apolo Estrada Jr., Danny Casas, Golden Magic, El Hijo del Diablo, Hijo del Máscara Año 2000, Pirata Morgan Jr. and Universo 2000 Jr.	#1 contender for the IWRG Junior de Juniors Championship, eight-man elimination match
