= Rebelión de los Juniors (2018) =

2018 International Wrestling Revolution Group event

- Official poster for the event
- Date: March 18, 2018
- City: Naucalpan, State of Mexico
- Venue: Arena Naucalpan

Event chronology
← Previous; El Protector	Next → Cabellera vs. Cabellera

IWRG Rebelión de los Juniors chronology
← Previous; 2017	Next → —

The Rebelión de los Juniors (2018) (Spanish for "The Junior Rebellion") was a major annual lucha libre event produced and scripted by Mexican professional wrestling promotion International Wrestling Revolution Group (IWRG), that took place on March 18, 2018 in Arena Naucalpan, Naucalpan, State of Mexico, Mexico. The focal point of the show was the Eponymous Rebelión de los Juniors tournament, an eleven-man elimination match where all wrestlers were either second or third-generation wrestlers. The last surviving participant was rewarded by becoming the number one contender for the IWRG Junior de Juniors Championship held by Máscara Año 2000 Jr. at the time of the show.

In the main event match El Hijo del Alebrije, which name literally means "The Son of El Alebrije, outlasted 10 other second or third-generation wrestlers in Apolo Estrada Jr., Capo del Norte, El Diablo Jr., Dr. Karonte, El Hijo del Medico Asesino.El Hijo del Pantera, El Hijo de Pirata Morgan, Lunatic Xtreme, Máscara Mágica Jr. and Hip Hop Man. He would later defeat Máscara Año 2000 Jr. to become the 17th IWRG Junior de Juniors Champion.

== Production ==
=== Background ===
Professional wrestling has been a generational tradition in lucha libre since its inception early in the 20th century, with many second- or third-generation wrestlers following in the footsteps of their fathers or mothers. Several lucha libre promotions honor those traditions, often with annual tournaments such as Consejo Mundial de Lucha Libre's La Copa Junior. The Naucalpan, State of Mexico-based International Wrestling Revolution Group (IWRG) in 2011 created the IWRG Junior de Juniors Championship, a championship where only second- or third-generation wrestlers are allowed to wrestle for it. In addition to real-life second- or third-generation wrestlers there are a number of wrestlers who are presented as second- or third-generation wrestlers, normally masked wrestlers promoted as "Juniors". These wrestlers normally pay a royalty or fee for the use of the name, using the name of an established star to get attention from fans and promoters. Examples of such instances of fictional family relationships include Cien Caras Jr. who paid Cien Caras for the rights to use the name. In March 2011, only weeks after the creation of the Junior de Juniors Championship IWRG held their first IWRG Rebelión de los Juniors show, with the focal point being the Junior de Juniors Championship and "Junior" competitors. The Rebelión de los Juniors shows, as well as the majority of the IWRG shows in general, are held in "Arena Naucalpan", owned by the promoters of IWRG and their main arena. The 2018 show was the eight year that IWRG used the Rebelión de los Juniors name and concept for a show.

=== Storylines ===
The event featured five professional wrestling matches with different wrestlers involved in pre-existing scripted feuds, plots and storylines. Wrestlers were portrayed as either heels (referred to as rudos in Mexico, those that portray the "bad guys") or faces (técnicos in Mexico, the "good guy" characters) as they followed a series of tension-building events, which culminated in a wrestling match or series of matches.

== Results ==
No.	Results	Stipulations
1	Atomic Star and Dragon Bane defeated Soma and Toto	Best two-out-of-three-falls tag team match
2	Lilith Dark and Star Fire defeated Dulce Luna and Lady Cat	Best two-out-of-three-falls tag team match
3	Los Comandos Elite (Oficial Liderk, Oficial Spartan and Oficial Spector) defeated Los Tortugas Ninjas (Leo, Mike and Teelo)	Best two-out-of-three-falls six-man tag team match
4	El Pantera II, Emperador Azteca and Veneno defeated Black Warrior, Máscara Año 2000 Jr. and X-Fly	Best two-out-of-three-falls six-man tag team match
5	Dr. Cerebro (c) defeated Ricky Marvin	Best two-out-of-three-falls match for the IWRG Intercontinental Middleweight Championship
6	El Hijo del Alebrije defeated Apolo Estrada Jr. and Capo del Norte and Diablo Jr. and Dr. Karonte and El Hijo del Medico Asesino and El Hijo del Pantera and Hijo de Pirata Morgan and Lunatic Extreme and Mascara Magica Jr. and Hip Hop Man	Rebelión de los Juniors elimination match
(c) / – the champion(s) heading into the match
