= Rebelión de los Juniors (2017) =

2017 International Wrestling Revolution Group event

- Official poster for the show
- Promotion: International Wrestling Revolution Group
- Date: March 19, 2017
- City: Naucalpan, State of Mexico
- Venue: Arena Naucalpan

Event chronology
| ← Previous; El Protector | Next → Guerra del Golfo |

Rebelión de los Juniors chronology
| ← Previous; 2016 | Next → 2018 |

Rebelión de los Juniors (2017) (Spanish for "The Junior Rebellion") was an annual professional wrestling major event produced by Mexican professional wrestling promotion International Wrestling Revolution Group (IWRG), that took place on March 19, 2017, in Arena Naucalpan, Naucalpan, State of Mexico, Mexico. The focal point of the show was the Eponymous Rebelión de los Juniors tournament, a ten-man elimination match where all wrestlers were either second or third-generation wrestlers. The last surviving participant was rewarded by becoming the number one contender for the IWRG Junior de Juniors Championship held by Herodes Jr. at the time of the show.

Previously the IWRG Rebelión de los Juniors tournaments had been eight-man elimination matches, but for the 2017 tournament IWRG had 10 participants; Argos, Bobby Lee Jr., Danny Casas, Diablo Jr., El Hijo del Alebrije, El Hijo de Pirata Morgan, The Killer Jr., Máscara Año 2000 Jr. Pirata Morgan Jr. and Silver King Jr. In the end Danny Casas defeated Máscara Año 2000 Jr. in the finals of the tournament. In addition to the ten tournament matches, the show featured five additional matches not related to the Rebelión de los Juniors tournament.

== Production ==
=== Background ===
Professional wrestling has been a generational tradition in lucha libre since its inception early in the 20th century, with many second- or third-generation wrestlers following in the footsteps of their fathers or mothers. Several lucha libre promotions honor those traditions, often with annual tournaments such as Consejo Mundial de Lucha Libre's La Copa Junior. The Naucalpan, State of Mexico-based International Wrestling Revolution Group (IWRG) in 2011 created the IWRG Junior de Juniors Championship, a championship where only second- or third-generation wrestlers are allowed to wrestle for it. In addition to real-life second- or third-generation wrestlers there are a number of wrestlers who are presented as second- or third-generation wrestlers, normally masked wrestlers promoted as "Juniors". These wrestlers normally pay a royalty or fee for the use of the name, using the name of an established star to get attention from fans and promoters. Examples of such instances of fictional family relationships include Cien Caras Jr. who paid Cien Caras for the rights to use the name. In March 2011, only weeks after the creation of the Junior de Juniors Championship IWRG held their first IWRG Rebelión de los Juniors show, with the focal point being the Junior de Juniors Championship and "Junior" competitors. The Rebelión de los Juniors shows, as well as the majority of the IWRG shows in general, are held in "Arena Naucalpan", owned by the promoters of IWRG and their main arena. The 2017 show was the seventh year in a row that IWRG used the Rebelión de los Juniors name for a show.

=== Storylines ===
The Rebelión de los Juniors event featured fifteen professional wrestling matches with different wrestlers involved in pre-existing scripted feuds, plots and storylines. Wrestlers were portrayed as either heels (referred to as rudos in Mexico, those that portray the "bad guys") or faces (técnicos in Mexico, the "good guy" characters) as they followed a series of tension-building events, which culminated in a wrestling match or series of matches.

== Family relationship ==
| Wrestler | Family | Relationship |
|---|---|---|
| Argos | Dr. Karonte | Father/Son |
| Bobby Lee Jr. | Bobby Lee | Father/Son |
| Danny Casas | Casas wrestling family | Grandson of Pepe Casas |
| Diablo Jr. | El Hijo del Diablo | Father/Son |
| El Hijo del Alebrije | Alebrije / Kraneo | Father/Son |
| El Hijo de Pirata Morgan | Pirata Morgan | Father/Son |
| The Killer Jr. | The Killer | Storyline father/Son |
| Máscara Año 2000 Jr. | Máscara Año 2000 | Storyline father/Son |
| Pirata Morgan Jr. | Pirata Morgan | Father/Son |
| Silver King Jr. | Silver King | Father/Son (Note: It has not been confirmed if Silver King Jr. is actually the son of Silver King.) |

== Results ==
| No. | Results | Stipulations |
|---|---|---|
| 1 | Shadow Boy defeated Araña de Plata | Singles match |
| 2 | Kanon defeated Skanda | Singles match |
| 3 | Los Exoticos (Demasiado, Diva Salvaje, Nigma) defeated Heddi Karaoui, Relámpago and X-Fly | Six-man "Lucha Libre rules" tag team match |
| 4 | Demonio Infernal defeated Black Dragón | Singles match |
| 5 | Acero, Eterno, Hip Hop Man, Keshin Black defeated Los Tortugas Ninja (Leo, Mike, Rafy and Teelo) | Six-man tag team Lumberjack match |
| 6 | Máscara Año 2000 Jr. and Silver King Jr. defeated Pirata Morgan Jr., The Killer Jr., Danny Casas, El Hijo del Alebrije, Bobby Lee Jr., Argos, Diablo Jr. and El Hijo de Pirata Morgan | 10-man Rebelión de los Juniors seeding battle royal |
| 7 | Máscara Año 2000 Jr. defeated Silver King Jr. | 2017 Rebelión de los Juniors tournament semi-final match |
| 8 | Hijo de Pirata Morgan defeated Argos | 2017 Rebelión de los Juniors tournament first round match |
| 9 | Hijo del Alebrije defeated The Killer Jr. | 2017 Rebelión de los Juniors tournament first round match |
| 10 | Pirata Morgan Jr. defeated Diablo Jr. | 2017 Rebelión de los Juniors tournament first round match |
| 11 | Danny Casas defeated Bobby Lee Jr. | 2017 Rebelión de los Juniors tournament first round match |
| 12 | Hijo de Pirata Morgan defeated El Hijo del Alebrije | 2017 Rebelión de los Juniors tournament quarter final match |
| 13 | Danny Casas defeated Pirata Morgan Jr. | 2017 Rebelión de los Juniors tournament quarter final match |
| 14 | Danny Casas defeated Hijo de Pirata Morgan | 2017 Rebelión de los Juniors tournament semi-final match |
| 15 | Danny Casas defeated Máscara Año 2000 Jr. | 2017 Rebelión de los Juniors tournament final match |
