= Carta Brava Jr. =

Mexican professional wrestler

Personal information
- Born: Sergio Marca; January 18, 1987 (age 39) Mexico City, Mexico
- Spouse: Goya Kong (m. 2015)

Professional wrestling career
- Ring name(s): Carta Brava Jr. Antaris
- Billed height: 1.68 m (5 ft 6 in)
- Billed weight: 82 kg (181 lb)
- Trained by: Carta Brava; Vaquero Fantasma II
- Debut: 2005

Sergio Marca (born January 18, 1987) is a Mexican professional wrestler, known as Carta Brava Jr., currently working for the Mexican promotion Lucha Libre AAA Worldwide (AAA) portraying a rudo ("bad guy") wrestling character. He is the son of the original Carta Brava and actually has a brother who uses the same name and mask, working as "Carta Brava Jr." as well. His name is Spanish for Fight Card.

Carta Brava Jr. is currently part of a trio known as El Nuevo Poder del Norte ("The New Power of the North") along with Tito Santana and Mocho Cota Jr. who works for Lucha Libre AAA Worldwide. The trio are former AAA World Trios Champions. From 2009 to 2013 he worked regularly for International Wrestling Revolution Group (IWRG) where he held the WWS World Welterweight Championship, IWRG Junior de Juniors Championship and the IWRG Intercontinental Lightweight Championship.

== Character confusion ==
There is some confusion about the character Carta Brava Jr. in professional wrestling as there are two different wrestlers using the same name and same mask design at the same time. Both claim to be sons of the original Carta Brava and have a long running storyline feud based around the claim, it is believed they are actually brothers, with this version of Carta Brava Jr. being the younger brother who took the name in 2008 when the previous Carta Brava Jr. was not an active wrestler.

== Professional wrestling career ==
The future Carta Brava Jr. made his professional wrestling debut in 2005 using the mask character Antaris, not revealing that he was related to Carta Brava. As Antaris he worked for a number of Mexican wrestling promotions, including International Wrestling Revolution Group (IWRG), where he wrestled against his brother Carta Brava Jr. on the undercard of the 2005 Rey del Ring show, losing the match. In 2008 his older brother had not been working as Carta Brava Jr. for a couple of years, either because he was not wrestling at all or because he was using a different ring name, which led Antaris to adopt the Carta Brava Jr. name and the mask of his father, only updating it with bright colors compared to the black and white design of the original mask. In 2009 the other Carta Brava Jr. resumed wrestling, working primarily in International Wrestling League (IWL) and not making it obvious that there were two different wrestlers using the name.

=== International Wrestling Revolution Group (2009–2013) ===
In International Wrestling Revolution Group Carta Brava Jr. was one of 10 wrestlers to complete in the 2010 El Castillo del Terror ("The Tower of Terror") steel cage match where the loser of the match would be forced to unmask. Carta Brava Jr. joined Oficial 911, Oficial AK-47, Alan Extreme, Centauro, Comando Negro, El Hijo de Aníbal, El Hijo del Cien Caras, Hijo de Pirata Morgan, Máscara Año 2000 Jr. and Trauma I as they all outlasted Arlequin Negro, forcing him to unmask. IWRG held a one night, ten man tournament on February 6, 2011 to determine the first ever IWRG Junior de Juniors Champion. Carta Brava Jr. participated in the tournament along with second-generation wrestlers Bestia 666, Hijo del Canek, El Hijo de L.A. Park, El Hijo de Máscara Año 2000, El Hijo de Pirata Morgan, Kung Fu Jr., Bobby Lee Jr., Trauma I and Ultraman Jr. Carta Brava Jr. lost in the first round to El Hijo de L.A. Park. On November 3, 2011 he participated in yet another El Castillo del Terror steel cage match, where he, Oficial 911, Hijo de L.A. Park, Golden Magic, El Hijo de Máscara Año 2000, Machin, Oficial Spartan, Super Nova and Zumbi who all outlasted King Drako. On December 22, 2011 at the Arena Naucalpan 34th Anniversary Show Carta Brava Jr. defeated Dinamic Black to win the IWRG Intercontinental Lightweight Championship. A few weeks later Carta Brava Jr. was teamed up with Máscara Año 2000 Jr. to compete in IWRG's El Protector tag team tournament. The team defeated Tritón and Tony Rivera but lost to Centvrión and Negro Navarro in the second round.

With the IWRG version of Carta Brava Jr. rising up the ranks the IWL version of Carta Brava Jr. made an appearance during an IWRG show, making it clear that there were indeed two versions of the character active, claiming that he was the true Carta Brava Jr. since he used the name first. The tension, storyline or real, between the brothers led to a prolonged storyline between the two. The two faced off on several occasions in IWL, including a "Bull Terrier" match, where both wrestlers are chained together with dog collars strapped around their necks. The IWL version of Carta Brava Jr. won the match in question. The storyline between the two did not lead to a Lucha de Apuestas, or mask vs. mask match between the two Carta Brava Jrs. On March 15, 2013 at IWRG's 2012 Rebelión de los Juniors event, Carta Brava Jr. was one of 10 wrestlers fighting for a match against the IWRG Junior de Juniors Championship but was eliminated by tournament winner Bestia 666. IWRG's annual Guerra del Golfo Carta Brava Jr. survived a steel cage match without having to put his mask in the line as he climbed out of the cage. He successfully defended the Lightweight Championship against Chicano as part of IWRG's Caravan de Campeones event. His next defense against Chicano was less successful as Carta Brava Jr. lost the championship. He was one of 10 wrestlers, including the other Carta Brava Jr. to put their mask or championship on the line in a steel cage match. The match ended with El Ángel winning the IWRG Intercontinental Middleweight Championship from Oficial Fierro while both Carta Brava Jrs. escaped the cage with their masks. Weeks later he was involved in another multi-man steel cage match at the 2012 El Castillo del Terror event, but managed to leave the cage before the final two wrestlers were forced to fight each other.

Carta Brava Jr. competed in the 2013 El Protector where he was teamed up with X-Fly for the tournament. The duo defeated Kiwby and Fuerza Guerrera in the first round, Hijo del Pantera and El Pantera in the second round and finally defeating Eita and Negro Navarro in the finals to win the entire tournament. A few weeks later he defeated Cerebro Negro to win the IWRG promoted WWS World Welterweight Championship. A few weeks later Carta Brava Jr. was the official challenger to Dinamic Black's IWRG Intercontinental Welterweight Championship at the 2013 Prison Fatal. The match was won by Dinamic Black, but drew such a favorable reaction from the crowd that they threw money into the ring as a sign of appreciation for a good match. On May 5, 2013 Dinamic Black defeated Carta Brava Jr. to win the WWS World Welterweight Championship, in a match where Dinamic Black's IWRG Intercontinental Welterweight Championship was also on the line. A few days later it was announced that he would begin working for Lucha Libre AAA World Wide (AAA), one of Mexico's two largest wrestling promotions, on its Evolución brand. On May 9, 2013 Carta Brava. Jr. defeated Hijo de Máscara Año 2000, Apolo Estrada Jr., Freyser, Cien Caras Jr., El Hijo de Dr. Wagner, Super Nova, El Hijo del Pirata Morgan, Trauma I and Trauma II in the main event of the 2013 Rebelión de los Juniors event to earn the rights to fight Oficial Factor for the IWRG Junior de Juniors Championship on May 16. Carta Barva Jr. defeated Factor to win the IWRG Junior de Juniors Championship May 17, 2013. His reign lasted only 24 days, until September 9, when he lost the belt to Trauma II.

=== Lucha Libre AAA Worldwide (2013–present) ===
In 2013 Carta Brava Jr. began working part-time for Lucha Libre AAA Worldwide (AAA) as a low level rudo, initially working in the first or second match of the night. It was not until 2015 that Carta Brava Jr. appeared at a major AAA show as he teamed up with Gran Apache to lose to Los Cadetes del Espacio (Ludxor and Venum) in the opening match of the Rey de Reyes show. At the 2017 Guerra de Titanes show he was one of seven wrestlers to compete in a steel cage match where the last two wrestlers would be forced to wrestle for their mask or hair at the subsequent major show. Carta Brava Jr. was the first man out of the cage, keeping his mask safe.

==== El Nuevo Poder del Norte (2017–present) ====
At the 2017 Rey de Reyes show, Carta Brava Jr., Soul Rocker and Mocho Cota Jr. attacked Dr. Wagner Jr. and Psycho Clown only moments after the team had won their match. After the attack the trio stole the mask of Dr. Wagner Jr. At a subsequent AAA show the trio, now dubbed El Nuevo Poder del Norte were wrestling against the trio of Australian Suicide, Lanzeloth and Máscara de Bronce when Dr. Wagner Jr and Psycho Clown entered the ring to attack them. Moments later Murder Clown and Monster Clown came to the ring to even the sides, leading to the match becoming a 5-on-5 tag team match instead. Dr. Wagner Jr. pinned Mocho Cota Jr. but was left without his mask once more after the match was over. During the AAA show on April 14 Dr. Wagner Jr. was slated to face Psycho Clown in the main event, but the two were attacked by El Nuevo Poder del Norte, leading to a tag team match where Soul Rocker and Carta Brava Jr. defeated Dr. Wagner Jr. and Psycho Clown. Following their victory Soul Rocker and Carta Brava Jr. challenged their opponents to put their masks on the line in a Lucha de Apuestas, or "bet match". Both Dr. Wagner Jr. and Psycho Clown verbally accepted the match but no official date for the match was announced. A week later El Nuevo Poder del Norte demanded a match for the AAA World Trios Championship as part of the show. Faby Apache came out, but without her championship partners Mari Apache and El Apache. Moments later Faby Apache brought out Dr. Wagner Jr. and Psycho Clown as her replacement partners for a match against El Nuevo Poder del Norte. El Nuevo Poder del Norte won the match by pinning Faby Apache, making them the new champions. On June 4, 2017 at the Verano de Escandalo show Carta Brava Jr. and his El Nuevo Poder del Norte Partner, Soul Rocker were unmasked by Dr. Wagner Jr. & Psycho Clown in a match that also involved Monster Clown & Murder Clown.

== Championships and accomplishments ==
- Alianza Universal De Lucha Libre
  - AULL Trios Championship (1 time, current) - with Cerebro Negro and Fantasma de la Opera
- International Wrestling Revolution Group
  - IWRG Intercontinental Lightweight Championship (1 times)
  - IWRG Junior de Juniors Championship (1 time)
  - WWS World Welterweight Championship (1 time)
  - El Protector (2013) –with X-Fly
- Lucha Libre AAA Worldwide

- AAA World Trios Championship (3 times) – with Mocho Cota Jr. and Soul Rocker/Tito Santana

== Luchas de Apuestas record ==
Winner (wager)	Loser (wager)	Location	Event	Date	Notes
Dr. Wagner Jr. and Psycho Clown (masks)	Nuevo Poder del Norte (masks) (Carta Brava Jr. and Soul Rocker)	Ciudad Juárez, Chihuahua	Verano de Escándalo	June 4, 2016	(Note: Match also included Monster Clown and Murder Clown)
Los OGTs (hairs) (Averno, Chessman and Super Fly)	El Nuevo Poder del Norte (hairs) (Carta Brava Jr., Mocho Cota Jr. and Tito Santana)	Monterrey, Nuevo León	Verano de Escándalo	June 3, 2018	
