= IWRG Cabellera vs. Cabellera (March 2018) =

2018 International Wrestling Revolution Group event

- Official poster showing Ricky Marvin and Dr. Cerebro
- Date: March 25, 2018
- City: Naucalpan, State of Mexico
- Venue: Arena Naucalpan

Event chronology
← Previous; Rebelión de los Juniors	Next → Guerra del Golfo

IWRG Lucha de Apuestas chronology
← Previous; February 2018	Next → June 2018

The IWRG Cabellera vs. Cabellera (Spanish for "Hair vs. Hair") show was a major lucha libre event produced and scripted by Mexican professional wrestling promotion International Wrestling Revolution Group (IWRG), that took place on March 25, 2018 in Arena Naucalpan, Naucalpan, State of Mexico, Mexico. The focal point of the Cabellera vs. Cabellera series of shows is one or more traditional Lucha de Apuestas, or "Bet matches", where all competitors in the match risk their hair on the outcome of the match. The Lucha de Apuestas is considered the most prestigious match type in lucha libre, especially when a wrestlers mask is on the line, but the "hair vs. hair" stipulation is held in almost as high regard.

For the March 2018 Cabellera vs. Cabellera event IWRG main-stay Dr. Cerebro faced off against Ricky Marvin, a luchador who has worked all over the world, including regular tours in Japan. The match was the world traveler Marvin pin Dr. Cerebro, forcing the IWRG regular to have all his hair shaved off as a result. The show also featured El Hijo del Alebrije defeating Máscara Año 2000 Jr. to win the IWRG Junior de Juniors Championship as well as four further bouts.

== Production ==
=== Background ===
In Lucha libre the wrestling mask holds a sacred place, with the most anticipated and prestigious matches being those where a wrestler's mask is on the line, a so-called Lucha de Apuestas, or "bet match" where the loser would be forced to unmask in the middle of the ring and state their birth name. Winning a mask is considered a bigger accomplishment in lucha libre than winning a professional wrestling championship and usually draws more people and press coverage. Losing a mask is often a watershed moment in a wrestler's career, they give up the mystique and prestige of being an enmascarado (masked wrestler) but usually come with a higher than usual payment from the promoter. By the same token a wrestler betting his hair in a Lucha de Apuestas is seen as highly prestigious, usually a step below the mask match.

=== Storylines ===
The event featured five professional wrestling matches with different wrestlers involved in pre-existing scripted feuds, plots and storylines. Wrestlers were portrayed as either heels (referred to as rudos in Mexico, those that portray the "bad guys") or faces (técnicos in Mexico, the "good guy" characters) as they followed a series of tension-building events, which culminated in a wrestling match or series of matches.

== Results ==
No.	Results	Stipulations
1	Dragon Bane defeated Toto	Best two-out-of-three-falls match
2	Lilith Dark and Star Fire defeated Dulce Luna and Lady Pink	Best two-out-of-three-falls tag team match
3	Emperador Azteca and Imposible defeated Gallo Frances and Septimo Dragon	Best two-out-of-three-falls tag team match
4	Las Traumas (Trauma I and Trauma II) and Obett defeated Los Tortugas Ninjas (Mike, Rafy and Teelo) and Los Comandos Elite (Oficial Factor, Oficial Spartan and Oficial Spector) and Capo del Norte, Capo del Sur and El Hijo del Medico Asesino	Four Way six-man tag team match
5	El Hijo del Alebrije defeated Máscara Año 2000 Jr. (c)	Best two-out-of-three-falls match for the IWRG Junior de Juniors Championship
6	Ricky Marvin defeated Dr. Cerebro	Lucha de Apuestas, hair vs. hair match
(c) / – the champion(s) heading into the match
