= Rebelión de los Juniors (2014) =

2014 International Wrestling Revolution Group event

- Official poster of the event depicting all eight "Juniors" in the main event.
- Promotion: International Wrestling Revolution Group
- Date: February 16, 2014 (aired February 23, 2014)
- City: Naucalpan, State of Mexico
- Venue: Arena Naucalpan

Event chronology
← Previous; El Protector	Next → Guerra del Golfo

Rebelión de los Juniors chronology
← Previous; 2013	Next → 2015

Rebelión de los Juniors (2013) (Spanish for "The Junior Rebellion") was an annual professional wrestling major event produced by Mexican professional wrestling promotion International Wrestling Revolution Group (IWRG), that took place on February 26, 2014 in Arena Naucalpan, Naucalpan, State of Mexico, Mexico. Select matches from the show aired on February 23, 2014 on the Mexican channel AYM Sports. The main event of the show was an eight-man elimination match featuring eight "Juniors" with the last surviving participant becoming the number one contender for the IWRG Junior de Juniors Championship held by Trauma II at the time.

== Production ==
=== Background ===
Professional wrestling has been a generational tradition in Lucha libre since its inception early in the 20th century, with a great deal of second or third-generation wrestlers following in the footsteps of their fathers or mothers. Several lucha libre promotions honor those traditions, often with annual tournaments such as Consejo Mundial de Lucha Libre's La Copa Junior. The Naucalpan, State of Mexico based International Wrestling Revolution Group (IWRG) created the IWRG Junior de Juniors Championship in 2011, a championship where only second or third-generation wrestlers are allowed to challenge for it. In addition to legitimate second-generation wrestlers there are a number of wrestlers who are presented as second or third-generation wrestlers, normally masked wrestlers promoted as "Juniors". These wrestlers normally pay a royalty or fee for the use of the name, using the name of an established star to get attention from fans and promoters. Examples of such instances of fictional family relationships include Arturo Beristain, also known as El Hijo del Gladiador ("The Son of El Gladiador") who was not related to the original El Gladiador, or El Hijo de Cien Caras who paid Cien Caras for the rights to use the name. Weeks after the creation of the Junior de Juniors Championship IWRG held their first IWRG Rebelión de los Juniors show with the centerpiece of the show being the Junior de Juniors Championship. The Rebelión de los Juniors shows, as well as the majority of the IWRG shows in general, are held in "Arena Naucalpan", owned by the promoters of IWRG and their main arena. The 2014 show was the fourth year in a row that IWRG used the Rebelión de los Juniors name for a show

=== Storylines ===
The event featured five professional wrestling matches with different wrestlers involved in pre-existing scripted feuds, plots and storylines. Wrestlers were portrayed as either heels (referred to as rudos in Mexico, those that portray the "bad guys") or faces (técnicos in Mexico, the "good guy" characters) as they followed a series of tension-building events, which culminated in a wrestling match or series of matches.

== Family relationship ==
Wrestler	Family	Relationship
Freesero, Jr.	Freesero	Father
El Hijo de Dos Casas	Dos Caras	Father
Hijo de Máscara Año 2000	Máscara Año 2000	Father
Hijo de Pirata Morgan	Pirata Morgan	Father
El Hijo de Fishman	Fishman	Father
Lizmark, Jr.	Lizmark	Father
Super Nova	El Texano	Father
Trauma I	Negro Navarro	Father

== Results ==
No.	Results	Stipulations
1	Fulgor I and Power Bull defeated Ángel del Amor and Dragón Celestial	Tag team match
2	Electro Boy, Comando Rayan and Tupac Amaru Jr. defeated Chico Che, La Diva Salvaje and Miss Gaviota	Best two-out-of-three falls six-man tag team match
3^{D}	Los Oficiales (Oficial 911 and Oficial AK-47) defeated Alan Extreme and Veneno	Tag team Super Libre tag team match
4	Golden Magic, Máscara Purpura and Relámpago defeated Eterno, Tony Rivera and Trauma II by disqualification	Best two-out-of-three falls six-man tag team match
5	Super Nova defeated El Hijo de Dos Casas, El Hijo de Fishman, Freesero, Jr., Hijo de Máscara Año 2000, Hijo de Pirata Morgan, Lizmark, Jr. and Trauma I	#1 contender for the IWRG Junior de Juniors Championship, eight-man Battle Royal
D / – this was a dark match
