= Rebelión de los Juniors (2011) =

2011 International Wrestling Revolution Group event

- Official poster with focus on the three men in the main event.
- Promotion: International Wrestling Revolution Group
- Date: Marcy 27, 2011
- City: Naucalpan, State of Mexico
- Venue: Arena Naucalpan

Event chronology
← Previous; Ex-CMLL vs. El Torero de Cuatro Caminos	Next → Unidos por un Amigo

Rebelión de los Juniors chronology
← Previous; First	Next → 2012

Rebelión de los Juniors (2012) (Spanish for "The Junior Rebellion") was the first annual professional wrestling major event under that name produced by Mexican professional wrestling promotion International Wrestling Revolution Group (IWRG). The show took place on March 27, 2011 in Arena Naucalpan, Naucalpan, State of Mexico, Mexico, IWRG's main venue. The main event focused on the newly created IWRG Junior de Juniors Championship with the inaugural champion El Hijo de Pirata Morgan put his championship on the line against El Hijo de L.A. Park and Trauma I. The two challengers both risked their mask on the outcome of the match and would have been forced to unmask if they were defeated as per Lucha de Apuestas or "Bet match" rules. The undercard featured an additional Luchas de Apuetas match, where the losing team of a Relevos Suicidas, losing team advances tag team match between the teams of Comando Negro/Multifacético and El Pollo Asesino/Eterno would be forced to wrestle each other.

== Production ==
=== Background ===
Professional wrestling has been a generational tradition in Lucha libre since its inception early in the 20th century, with a great deal of second or third-generation wrestlers following in the footsteps of their fathers or mothers. Several lucha libre promotions honor those traditions, often with annual tournaments such as Consejo Mundial de Lucha Libre's La Copa Junior. The Naucalpan, State of Mexico based International Wrestling Revolution Group (IWRG) created the IWRG Junior de Juniors Championship in 2011, a championship where only second or third-generation wrestlers are allowed to challenge for it. In addition to legitimate second-generation wrestlers there are a number of wrestlers who are presented as second or third-generation wrestlers, normally masked wrestlers promoted as "Juniors". These wrestlers normally pay a royalty or fee for the use of the name, using the name of an established star to get attention from fans and promoters. Examples of such instances of fictional family relationships include Arturo Beristain, also known as El Hijo del Gladiador ("The Son of El Gladiador") who was not related to the original El Gladiador, or El Hijo de Cien Caras who paid Cien Caras for the rights to use the name. Weeks after the creation of the Junior de Juniors Championship IWRG held their first IWRG Rebelión de los Juniors show with the centerpiece of the show being the Junior de Juniors Championship. The Rebelión de los Juniors shows, as well as the majority of the IWRG shows in general, are held in "Arena Naucalpan", owned by the promoters of IWRG and their main arena.

=== Storylines ===
The event featured seven professional wrestling matches with different wrestlers involved in pre-existing scripted feuds, plots and storylines. Wrestlers were portrayed as either heels (referred to as rudos in Mexico, those that portray the "bad guys") or faces (técnicos in Mexico, the "good guy" characters) as they followed a series of tension-building events, which culminated in a wrestling match or series of matches.

== Family relationships ==
Wrestler	Family	Relationship
El Hijo de L.A. Park	L.A. Park	Father
El Hijo de Pirata Morgan	Pirata Morgan	Father
Trauma I	Negro Navarro	Father

== Results ==
No.	Results	Stipulations
1	Dragon Fly and Tonatiu defeated Epidemia and Imposible – two falls to one	Tag Team two-out-of-three falls match
2	Dinamic Black and Yack defeated Alan Extreme and Gemelo Fantastico II – two falls to one	Tag Team two-out-of-three falls match
3	Los Oficiales (Oficial 911, Oficial AK-47 and Oficial Fierro) defeated El Ángel, Golden Magic and Veneno – two falls to one	Best two-out-of-three falls six-man tag team match
4	Comando Negro and Multifacético defeated El Pollo Asesino and Eterno	Relevos Suicidas, losing team advances tag team match
5	Eterno defeated El Pollo Asesino – two falls to one	Lucha de Apuestas, hair vs. hair match
6	El Hijo de L.A. Park (mask) defeated El Hijo de Pirata Morgan (C) and Trauma I (mask)	Luchas de Apuestas, "Loser Advances" mask vs. mask vs. IWRG Junior de Juniors Championship match.
7	Trauma I (mask) defeated El Hijo de Pirata Morgan (C)	Luchas de Apuestas, mask vs. IWRG Junior de Juniors Championship match.
