= Máscara Sagrada Jr. =

Mexican professional wrestler

Personal information
- Born: September 12, 1973 (age 52) Mexico City, Mexico

Professional wrestling career
- Ring names: Aguila de Acero; Directo; Emo Extreme; Máscara Jr.; Máscara Sagrada Jr.; Muerte Roja; Principe Zafiro; Super AAA
- Trained by: Tigre Tatuado; Jerrito Estrada; Taro Yenekura
- Debut: 1992

Hugo Torres Sapp (born September 12, 1973), best known by his ring name Máscara Sagrada Jr., is a Mexican professional wrestling. He is best known for appearing in the Asistencia Asesoría y Administración (AAA) promotion. While he portrays a storyline relative of Máscara Sagrada, they are not related.

Máscara Sagrada Jr. has worked under various ring names such as Aguila de Acero, Directo, Emo Extreme, Máscara Jr., Super AAA, and Muerte Roja. He is a former holder of the Mexican National Middleweight Championship and co-holder the Mexican National Atómicos Championship along with Blue Demon Jr., La Parka Jr. and Perro Aguayo Jr.

== Championships and accomplishments ==
- Lucha Libre AAA Worldwide
  - Mexican National Middleweight Championship (1 time)
  - Mexican National Atómicos Championship (1 time) with Blue Demon Jr., La Parka Jr. and Perro Aguayo Jr. (1)
