= Máscara Sagrada =

Mexican Luchador enmascarado (born 1959)

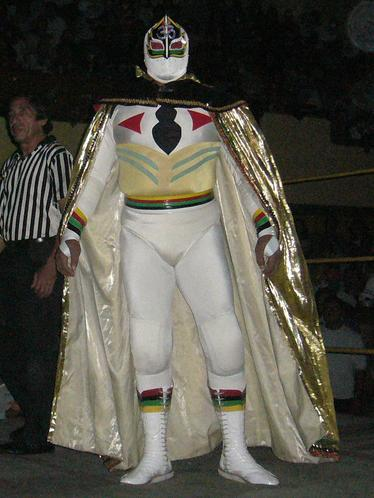

Personal information
- Born: November 6, 1959 (age 66) Xalapa, Veracruz, Mexico

Professional wrestling career
- Ring name(s): Alimaña II; Ecatón; Hecatombe; El Hombre sin Nombre; Mágico; Máscara Sagrada; Máscara Sagrada Original; Máscara Sacra; Poder Mágico
- Billed height: 1.80 m (5 ft 11 in)
- Billed weight: 115 kg (254 lb)
- Trained by: Espectro I Shadito Cruz; Villano I Antonio Hernández
- Debut: September 2, 1978
- Retired: 2021

Máscara Sagrada (born November 6, 1959) is a Mexican professional wrestler. He has worked for every major Mexican wrestling promotion over the last 20 years. His ring name is Spanish for "Sacred Mask" and is inspired by the "sanctity" of wrestling masks in his country.

Sagrada has been involved in a long running copyright dispute over the use of the Máscara Sagrada name, outfit and mask with AAA, who claimed that they owned the copyright to the character and has even promoted other wrestlers as "Máscara Sagrada". Máscara Sagrada's real name is not a matter of public record, as is often the case with masked wrestlers in Mexico where their private lives are kept a secret from the wrestling fans.

== Professional wrestling career ==
The wrestler who would later be known as Máscara Sagrada was trained for his professional wrestling career by Espectro I, Villano I, Shadito Cruz, and Antonio Hernández before making his debut on September 2, 1978. He initially worked as the masked wrestler Hecatombe, which is Spanish for "Disaster" or "Massacre". In the early-to-mid 1980s Hecatombe won both the Texcoco Welterweight Championship and the Naucalpan Middleweight Championship while working for various local promotions. In 1987 he briefly worked as Ecatón before adopting the name "Magico" in October 1987, as he began working for Empresa Mexicana de Lucha Libre (EMLL). In 1988 he briefly worked as El Alimaña II ("The Pest II") but soon returned to wrestling as Magico. In 1989, EMLL booker Antonio Peña brought in another wrestler who had worked as Magico in a local promotion, leading to the local Magico winning the rights to the name. Subsequently, the future Máscara Sagrada worked as "Hombre Sin Nombre" ("Man with no name") for a short while in 1989.

=== Becoming Máscara Sagrada ===
EMLL booker Peña used the "Hombre Sin Nombre" storyline to create a new character, a character inspired by the sanctity of the mask in Lucha Libre, called Máscara Sagrada ("Sacred Mask"). Máscara Sagrada made his debut in June 1989. The vibrant colors of Máscara Sagrada's full bodysuit and mask, coupled with a very innovative mask design for the times made Máscara Sagrada a character the fans took notice of, and coupled with Máscara Sagrada's wrestling skills and charisma, he soon began moving up the ranks of EMLL. On March 21, 1991, Máscara Sagrada's climb up the ranks was rewarded with the Mexican National Light Heavyweight Championship, which he won from Pierroth, Jr. Two months later he participated in a tournament to crown the first ever CMLL World Heavyweight Champion (EMLL had been renamed to Consejo Mundial de Lucha Libre in the winter of 1990). He lost in the first round to Cien Caras. His popularity led to CMLL creating a Mini-Estrella version of Máscara Sagrada called Mascarita Sagrada.

During this time Máscara Sagrada starred in a movie called Octagón y Máscara Sagrada, lucha a muerte ("Octagon and Máscara Sagrada in Fight to the Death" in the US) alongside fellow luchador Octagón. The movie led to Máscara Sagrada and Octagón teaming up on a regular basis, with Atlantis being added to form a trio. Since all three wrestlers had starred in movies they were dubbed Los Moviestars. Los Moviestars won the Mexican National Trios Championship from a team called "Los Thundercats" (which was patterned after the ThunderCats animated series) on April 29, 1991. The team's reign as Trios champions came to an end on August 11, 1991, when Los Capos (Cien Caras, Máscara Año 2000 and Universo 2000) beat them for the championship.

=== Asistencia Asesoria y Administracion / AAA (1992–1997) ===
In 1992 CMLL booker Antonio Peña decided to leave CMLL and create his own promotion, Asistencia Asesoria y Administracion, later known simply as AAA in order to carry out the vision he had for how wrestling should be promoted. When Peña left CMLL a lot of young wrestlers left with Peña, staying loyal to the man that had advocated that they should be featured more. One of these wrestlers was Máscara Sagrada, who in addition to leaving CMLL also took the Mexican National Light Heavyweight Championship with him when he jumped. On May 29, 1992, Máscara Sagrada lost the title to Universo 2000; with the title change the Mexico City Boxing and Wrestling Commission officially recognized AAA's control of the title.

Máscara Sagrada wrestled on AAA's inaugural Triplemanía show, teaming with Love Machine and Mascarita Sagrada to defeat the team of Jerry Estrada, Blue Panther, and Jerrito Estrada. Following Triplemanía I Máscara Sagrada became involved in a storyline feud with AAA's main rudo (bad guy) group Los Gringos Locos of Eddy Guerrero, Love Machine, Konnan and Black Cat. Máscara Sagrada's main opponent was Black Cat, building to a Lucha de Apuesta, mask vs. mask match between the two at Triplemanía II-B. The match was the semi-main event of the show and saw Máscara Sagrada defeated Black Cat two falls to one, forcing Black Cat to unmask and reveal his real name. A few weeks later Máscara Sagrada also appeared at Triplemanía II-C, teaming with Hijo del Santo, Lizmark and Perro Aguayo to defeat the team of Black Cat, El Satánico, La Parka and Psicosis two falls to one. At Triplemanía III-C, he teamed with Konnan, Aguayo, and Latin Lover, losing to the team of Cien Caras, Máscara Año 2000, Fishman, and Jerry Estrada as one of the featured matches. On September 20, 1996 Máscara Sagrada defeated Pierroth, Jr. to win the Mexican National Heavyweight Championship, a title he held for 275 days in total before losing it to Cibernético. At Triplemanía IV-B Máscara Sagrada appeared in the main event, teaming with La Parka and Octagón to defeat Killer, Cien Caras, and Heavy Metal in a Lumberjack match.

=== Copyright problems ===
In 1995, Máscara Sagrada was made controller of AAA along with Super Muñeco; as controller he discovered that Televisa, the TV channel that technically owned AAA and showed its programming, was receiving royalty payments on merchandise for various wrestlers including Máscara Sagrada himself. When he asked about why he did not receive any royalty payments, Televisa executives told him that Peña had given the rights to the name "Máscara Sagrada" to Televisa and thus owned all royalties made from the name. This coupled with the frustration of AAA creating a Máscara Sagrada, Jr. character to capitalize on the fame of the original Máscara Sagrada caused Máscara Sagrada to leave AAA in 1997. Peña and AAA acted quickly and replaced Máscara Sagrada with a new wrestler under the name, claiming that the original Máscara Sagrada had no rights to use the name. This led to Máscara Sagrada not being allowed to wrestle under the "Máscara Sagrada" name, especially while the issue was in court. During this time he wrestled sporadically, booked under names such as Máscara Sagrada Original and Máscara Sacra, but being unable to wrestle as Máscara Sagrada meant that between 1997 and 2004 he only worked sporadic matches. In 2004 he began working for CMLL again, although because of the legal problems he did not appear on any of CMLL's shows on Televisa. In 2005 he won the rights to the name, documented by Mexico's National Institute of Copyright.

=== After AAA (2000–2021) ===
On August 28, 2000, Máscara Sagrada faced off in a four-way match against Fishman, La Parka, and Shu El Guerrero where the first two wrestlers pinned would have to face off against each other with their mask on the line in a Lucha de Apuesta match. Máscara Sagrada was the first man pinned and Fishman the second, forcing them to fight for their masks. Máscara Sagrada won the match, forcing Fishman to unmask and reveal his real name per Lucha Libre traditions. The following year Máscara Sagrada faced Fishman's son Fishman, Jr. in a Lucha en el reves where two masked wrestlers face off in a match where their hair is on the line. This time Fishman, Jr. gained a measure of revenge by pinning Máscara Sagrada, forcing him to have his hair shaved off after the match. This match was the first time Máscara Sagrada lost a Lucha de Apuesta match in his career.

In CMLL Máscara Sagrada received several title matches against CMLL World Heavyweight Champion Universo 2000 but was unsuccessful in his challenges. Through CMLL's working arrangement with International Wrestling Revolution Group (IWRG) Máscara Sagrada also made several appearances for the Naucalpan, Mexico State based IWRG. In 2004 he teamed up with El Sagrado for that year's Torneo Gran Alternativa, a tournament that features tag teams consisting of a veteran (Máscara Sagrada) and a novato or rookie (Sagrado). The team lost in the first round to the team of Shocker (veteran) and Alan Stone (novato). He also participated in the 2004 Leyenda de Azul as well as the 2005 Leyenda de Azul tournaments, being eliminated early on in each tournament. Máscara Sagrada wrestled his last match for CMLL in 2007, working occasional matches on the Mexican Independent circuit. In 2008 he worked a series of matches for Alianza Universal de Lucha Libre (AULL). He also worked the first two shows of Blue Demon, Jr.'s NWA Mexico promotion. In 2009 and 2010 he wrestled several matches for the California based Pro Wrestling Revolution (PWR) promotion, including teaming with Blue Demon, Jr. and Jon Andersen wrestling against the Border Partrol, PWR's top heel group. He also teamed with Rey Tigre to defeat Psicosis II and Vaquero Fantasma on a PWR show on May 5, 2010.

== Private life ==
Máscara Sagrada has two sons who have joined their father as professional wrestlers, using the ring names "Máscara Sagrada, Jr." and "Hijo de Máscara Sagrada".

== Not to be mistaken for ==
Since leaving AAA in 1997 AAA had several other wrestlers wrestling under the name and wearing the outfit. It is likely that AAA has used other wrestlers for short periods of time but the following are the wrestlers who have wrestled as Máscara Sagrada:

- Cachorro Mendoza was the first man AAA used as Máscara Sagrada after the original left the promotion. His time under the mask was very short-lived.
- The wrestler now working as El Alebrije wrestled as Máscara Sagrada in 1997 and 1998.
- Luis Alberto Medina appeared once or twice as Máscara Sagrada, which was notable only for the fact that he later began wrestling as Máscara Maligna, the "evil arch enemy" of the Máscara Sagrada character.
- The last wrestler AAA used to play the part changed his character in 2006 after a court ruling and is now known as Máscara Divina, a variation of the Máscara Sagrada character.

There are also a number of other wrestlers who have at one point or another used a ring character, mask and outfit very similar to Máscara Sagrada:

- Máscara Sagrada, Jr., a storyline relative of Máscara Sagrada. Originally given the name by AAA, he occasionally used the name on the independent circuit in Mexico until early 2010 when he changed his name to just "Máscara, Jr.".
- Mascarita Sagrada, a Mascota version of the original, one of the "founding fathers" of today's Mini-Estrellas. Like the regular sized Máscara Sagrada, AAA gave the mask and name to several other wrestlers after the original left the promotion.
- Tzuki wrestled as Máscarita Sagrada, Jr. in 1996 and 1997
- Máscarita Dorada took the part of Máscarita Sagrada when the original left and is often denoted as "Máscarita Sagrada 2000" for the year he made his debut
- AAA currently has a third Mini-Estrella working as Máscarita Sagrada, denoted as Mascarita Sagrada (2007) for the year he began using the name.

== Championships and accomplishments ==
- Asistencia Asesoria y Administracion / AAA
  - Mexican National Tag Team Championship (1 time) – with La Parka Jr.
  - IWC World Heavyweight Championship (1 time)
  - Mexican National Heavyweight Championship (1 time)
- Colossal
  - Copa Frontera (2014) - with LA Par-K and Octagón
- Consejo Mundial de Lucha Libre
  - Mexican National Light Heavyweight Championship (1 time)
  - Mexican National Trios Championship (1 time) – with Atlantis and Octagón
- Pro Wrestling Illustrated
  - PWI ranked him # 294 of the 500 best singles wrestlers in the PWI 500 in 1997
- WAR
  - WAR Heavyweight Championship (1 time)
- World Wrestling Organisation
  - WWO Heavyweight Championship (2 times)
- Mexican State championships
  - Texcoco Welterweight Championship (1 time)
  - Naucalpan Middleweight Championship (1 time)

== Luchas de Apuestas record ==
Winner (wager)	Loser (wager)	Location	Event	Date	Notes
Hecatombe (mask)	Impala (hair)	Texcoco, México	Live event	1979	
Hecatombe (mask)	Príncipe Zafiro (mask)	Texcoco, State of Mexico	Live event	1980	
Hecatombe (mask)	Johnny Ramírez (hair)	Texcoco, State of Mexico	Live event	1983	
Hecatombe (mask)	Bestia Negra I (mask)	Naucalpan, State of Mexico	Live event	1983	
Hecatombe (mask)	Gigante Blanco (mask)	Naucalpan, State of Mexico	Live event	1983	
Hecatombe (mask)	Ruddy Ramos (hair)	Texcoco, State of Mexico	Live event	June 25, 1983	
Mágico (mask)	Konnan the Barbarian (mask)	Guadalajara, Jalisco	Live event	November 1988	
Máscara Sagrada (mask)	Black Cat (mask)	Zapopan, Jalisco	Triplemanía II-B	May 15, 1994	
Máscara Sagrada (mask)	Fantomas (mask)	Pachuca, Hidalgo	Live event	February 5, 1998	(Note: This match came about as a result of the team losing the finals of a "losers advance" tag team tournament to Blue Panther and Mosco de la Merced)
Máscara Sagrada (mask)	Pirata Morgan (hair)	Aguascalientes, Aguascalientes	Live event	April 21, 1998	
Máscara Sagrada (mask)	Popitekus (hair)	Tlalnepantla, State of Mexico	Live event	August 23, 1998	
Máscara Sagrada (mask)	América (mask) (Note: Not the character played by El Pantera in CMLL)	San Luis Potosí, San Luis Potosí	Live event	October 4, 1998	
Máscara Sagrada (mask)	Pirata Morgan (hair)	N/A	Live event	December 1998	
Máscara Sagrada (mask)	Corsario (mask)	Cuernavaca, Morelos	Live event	December 16, 1999	(Note: Steel Cage match that also included Black Warrior, Violencia, Máscara Mágica, Super Muñeco and Super Ratón)
Máscara Sagrada (mask)	Fishman (mask)	Mexico City	GWAS show	August 28, 2000	(Note: Four way match that also included La Parka and Shu El Guerrero)
Fishman Jr. (hair)	Máscara Sagrada (hair)	Ciudad Juárez, Chihuahua	Live event	February 2001	(Note: Hair vs. Hair match between masked wrestlers)
Máscara Sagrada (mask)	El Boricua (mask)	Cuernavaca, Morelos	Live event	August 16, 2001	(Note: victory sometimes attributed to Atlantis)
