= Apolo Estrada Jr. =

Mexican professional wrestler

Personal information
- Born: Roberto Guadalupe Estrada Zúñiga; January 10, 1987 (age 39) Nuevo Laredo, Tamaulipas, Mexico
- Family: Apolo Estrada (Father)
- Website: Facebook page

Professional wrestling career
- Ring name(s): Apolo Estrada Jr. El Chupacabras
- Billed height: 175 cm (5 ft 9 in)
- Trained by: El Vasco
- Debut: 2000

Apolo Estrada Jr. is the ring name of Roberto Guadalupe Estrada Zúñiga (born January 10, 1987), a Mexican professional wrestler. He is the son of professional wrestler Apolo Estrada and has worked for Consejo Mundial de Lucha Libre (CMLL), International Wrestling Revolution Group (IWRG) as well as working for many professional wrestling promotions on the Mexican independent circuit. From 2009 to 2015 he was a member of a wrestling group known as Los Gringos VIP and currently forms a team known as Los Insportables with Eterno.

== Professional wrestling career ==
Roberto Estrada began his professional wrestling career in 2000, working as the masked character El Chupacabras. Estrada was around 13 years old when he wrestled his first match, something that is not unheard of in Mexican professional wrestling (Note: The most well documented instance is Rey Mysterio who was 14 years old at the time of his first match.)

=== Monterrey (2003–2008) ===
By 2003 he began working regularly in Monterrey, now unmasked and billed as Apolo Estrada Jr. for Federacion Internacional de Lucha Libre. Over the next five years Estrada Jr. was a regular worker for the promotion, holding a number of different championships, often teaming with Estrella Dorada Jr. During his time in Monterrey he competed in a number of Luchas de Apuestas, or bet matches, the most prestigious match type in Mexico. He won the hair of Crazzy Demon, Androide, Potro Jr. and Gato Volador as well as the mask of Black Gordman Jr. By the same token he also lost several match and as a result was shaved bald after losing to long time partner/rival Estrella Dorada Jr. as well as Corazo de Barrior and Hombre Sin Miedo.

=== Consejo Mundial de Lucha Libre (2009–2010) ===
In 2009 Estrada Jr. began working for Consejo Mundial de Lucha Libre (CMLL) as a low ranked rudo (those that portray the "bad guys"). The highlight of his time in CMLL was a ten-man steel cage match where Apolo Estrada Jr. defeated Brazo de Platino in the end, forcing Brazo de Platino to be shaved bald as a result.

=== IWRG and independent circuit (2010–present) ===
Estrada left CMLL in late 2010 and began working for a variety of promotions on Mexico's independent circuit, including making regular appearances for International Wrestling Revolution Group IWRG.

==== Los Gringos VIP (2011–2015) ====
In late 2011 the group known as Los Gringos Locos (El Hijo del Diablo, Avisman and Gringo Loco) held the Distrito Federal Trios Championship when Gringo Loco left Mexico and stopped working for IWRG. The Mexico City wrestling commission allowed IWRG to substitute Gringo Loco with Apolo Estrada Jr. to carry on the Distrito Federal Trios Championship. The group would later be renamed Los Gringos VIP as they held the Trios title for over a year, until March 19, 2012. The trio regained the championship in September, 2013. With Gringos VIP partner El Hijo del Diablo Estrada Jr. won the IWRG Intercontinental Tag Team Championship on May 21, 2015 as they defeated Alan Extreme and Veneno to win the titles. Their run with the tag team championship lasted only 25 days until IWRG decided to move the titles over to Los Oficiales (Oficial 911 and Oficial AK-47) instead. Estrada Jr. also held the WWS World Welterweight Championship, a title promoted by IWRG, as he defeated Dr. Cerebro to win the vacant title on December 8, 2013. Dr. Cerebro would later win the title from Estrada Jr. On August 14, 2015 Los Terribles Cerebros (Black Terry, Dr. Cerebro and Cerebro Negro) won the Distrito Federal Trios titles from Los Gringos VIP, ending their reign after 643 days. Los Gringos VIP, in this instance Apolo Estrada Jr. and El Hijo del Diablo, defeated Los Panteras (Pantera and El Hijo del Pantera) to win the IWRG Intercontinental Tag Team Championship for the second time. Their title reign lasted 67 days until Los Panteras regained the championship. After the title loss Estrada Jr. and Hijo del Diablo attacked each other, blaming the other for the loss and ending the Los Gringos VIP faction.

==== Los Insoportables (2015–present) ====
In the week following the break up of Los Gringos VIP Apolo Estrada Jr. began teaming regularly with Eterno, forming a tag team known as Los Insoportables ("The Unsupportable Ones"). As part of the team Apolo Estrada Jr. often supported Eterno as Eterno feuded with Black Terry. Los Insoportables are scheduled to put their hair on the line in the main event of the Arena Naucalpan 38th Anniversary Show, facing off against the Terribles Cerebroros team of Black Terry and Dr. Cerebro.

== Championships and accomplishments ==
- Federacion Internacional de Lucha Libre
  - FILL Atomicos Championship (1 time) – with Chuco Mar Jr., Estrella Dorada Jr. and Gato Volador
  - FILL Middleweight Championship (1 time)
  - FILL Tag Team Championship (2 times) – With Halloween (1) and Estrella Dorada Jr. (1)
  - FILL Trios Championship (2 times) – with Chuco Mar Jr. and Estrella Dorada Jr. (1), Monje Negro Jr. and Estrella Dorada Jr. (1)
  - FILL Welterweight Championship (2 times)
  - FILL World Cruiserweight Championship (1 time)
- International Wrestling Revolution Group
  - IWRG Intercontinental Tag Team Championship (2 times) – with El Hijo del Diablo
  - Distrito Federal Trios Championship (2 times) – with El Hijo del Diablo and Avisman
  - WWS World Welterweight Championship (1 time)
  - Copa Revolucionaria
- Independent circuit
  - North East Tag Team Championship (1 time) – with Estrella Dorada Jr.
  - TIJ Latin American Trios Championship (1 time) – with Trauma I and Trauma II

== Luchas de Apuestas record ==
Winner (wager)	Loser (wager)	Location	Event	Date	Notes
Apolo Estrada Jr. (hair)	Crazzy Demon (hair)	Monterrey, Nuevo León	House Show	May 18, 2003	
Apolo Estrada Jr. (hair)	Androide (hair)	Monterrey, Nuevo León	House Show	October 5, 2003	
Estrella Dorada Jr. (hair)	Apolo Estrada Jr. (hair)	Monterrey, Nuevo León	House Show	October 12, 2003	
Apolo Estrada Jr. (hair)	Potro Jr. (hair)	Monterrey, Nuevo León	House Show	January 18, 2004	
Apolo Estrada Jr. (hair)	Black Gordman Jr. (mask)	Monterrey, Nuevo León	House Show	June 6, 2004	
Corazón de Barrio (hair)	Apolo Estrada Jr. (hair)	Reynosa, Tamaulipas	House Show	March 6, 2005	
Hombre Sin Miedo (mask)	Apolo Estrada Jr.(hair)	Nuevo Laredo, Tamaulipas	House Show	July 4, 2005	(Note: Estrada Jr and Hombre SIn Miedo lost a Relevos Suicida match to Sangre Chicana and Super Brazo and were forced to wrestle each other.)
Apolo Estrada Jr. (hair)	Gato Volador (hair)	Monterrey, Nuevo León	House Show	August 5, 2007	(Note: Captains in a six-man tag team match that also included Androide, Aventurero, Estrella Dorada Jr. and Caifán Rockero I.)
Doberman (hair)	Apolo Estrada Jr. (hair)	Monterrey, Nuevo León	House Show	August 1, 2008	
Apolo Estrada Jr. (hair)	Brazo de Platino (hair)	Chilpancingo, Guerrero	House Show	November 19, 2010	(Note: Last two competitors in a steel cage match that also included Volador Jr. La Máscara, Psicosis, El Hijo de Aníbal, Héctor Garza, Histeria, Dragón Rojo Jr. and Atlantis)
Apolo Estrada Jr. (hair)	Bugambilia del Norte (hair)	Naucalpan, State of Mexico	IWRG House Show	December 8, 2011	
Multifacético (hair)	Apolo Estrada Jr. (hair)	Naucalpan, State of Mexico	IWRG House Show	January 1, 2012	
Black Silver Jr. (hair)	Apolo Estrada Jr. (hair)	Acapulco, Guerrero	House Show	May 20, 2012	
Apolo Estrada Jr. (hair)	Chico Che (hair)	Naucalpan, State of Mexico	Guerra del Golfo	April 18, 2013	(Note: Both men lost a steel cage match earlier in the night and were forced to face each other.)
Apolo Estrada Jr. (hair)	Arez (hair)	Ecatepec, State of Mexico	House Show	September 29, 2013	
Apolo Estrada Jr. (hair)	Oficial AK-47 (hair)	Naucalpan, State of Mexico	IWRG House Show	December 1, 2013	(Note: This was a four-way elimination match that also involved El Hijo de Pirata Morgan and X-Fly.)
Dr. Cerebro (hair)	Apolo Estrada Jr. (hair)	Naucalpan, State of Mexico	IWRG House Show	December 15, 2013	
Apolo Estrada Jr. (hair)	El Marquez Jr. (mask)	Chilpancingo, Guerrero	House Show	October 4, 2015	(Note: This was a four-way elimination match that also included Canis Lupus and Súper Nova)
Los Insoportables (Hair) (Eterno and Apolo Estrada Jr.)	Los Terribles Cerebros (Hair) (Black Terry and Dr. Cerebro)	Naucalpan, State of Mexico	Arena Naucalpan 38th Anniversary Show	December 20, 2015	
Imposible (Championship)	Apolo Estrada Jr. (Hair)	Naucalpan, State of Mexico	IWRG Show	January 15, 2017	(Note: This was a three-way match that also included Relampago)
