= El Hijo de L.A. Park =

Mexican professional wrestler

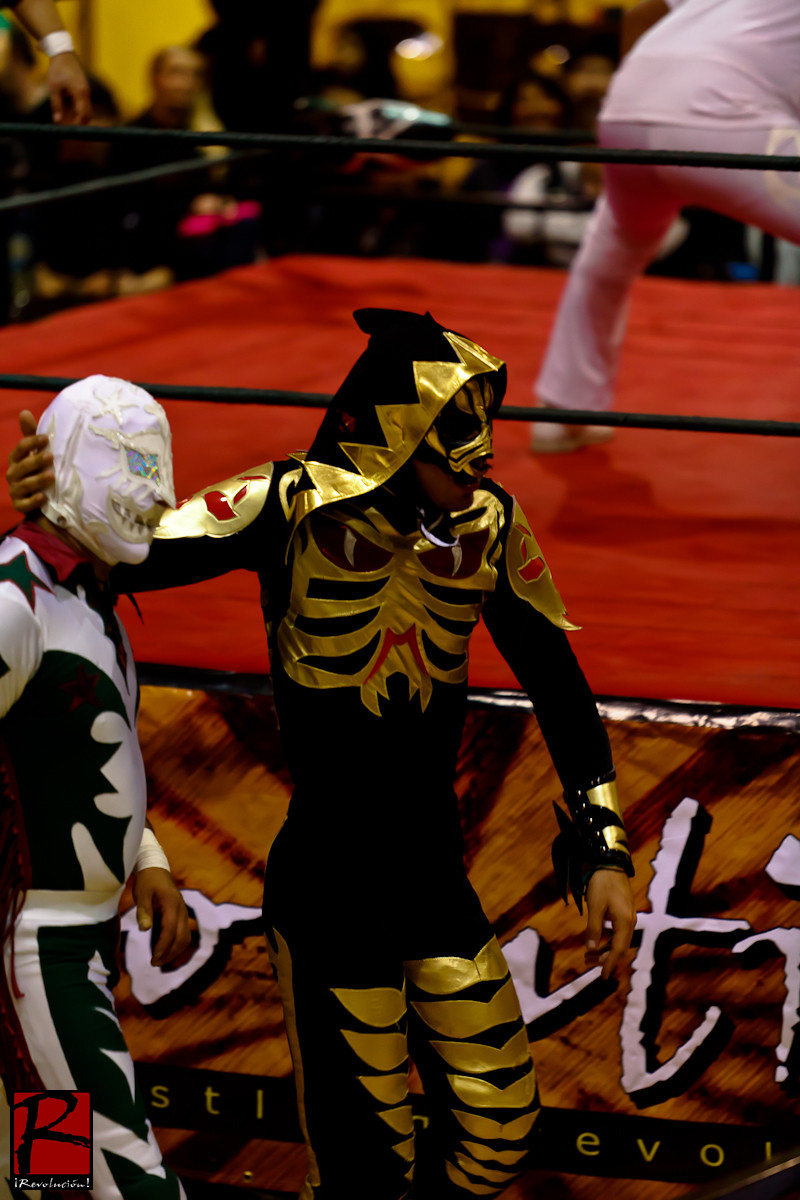
- Hijo de L.A. Park during a Pro Wrestling Revolution event

Personal information
- Born: November 20, 1988 (age 37) Monclova, Coahuila, Mexico
- Parent: L.A. Park (father)
- Relatives: L.A. Park Jr. (brother); El Hijo de Cien Caras (uncle); Super Parka (great-uncle); Volador Jr. (first cousin once removed); Flyer (great-nephew)

Professional wrestling career
- Ring name(s): El Hijo de L.A. Park; Black Spirit
- Billed height: 1.85 m (6 ft 1 in)
- Billed weight: 90.7 kg (200 lb)
- Billed from: Monclova, Coahuila, Mexico
- Trained by: Pierko El Boricua; Skayde; Tony Salazar; L.A. Park
- Debut: July 9, 2008

El Hijo de L.A. Park (born November 20, 1988) is a Mexican professional wrestler. better known for his time in Major League Wrestling (MLW) where he is a former one-time MLW World Tag Team Champion with his father L.A Park. He currently wrestles in Mexico in the independent Circuit and appearances for Lucha Libre AAA Worldwide he is one half of the AULL Tag Team Champions with his brother L.A Park Jr in their first reign. Originally he wrestled under the name "Black Spirit", keeping the family relation to L.A. Park secret. He has been using the El Hijo de L.A. Park name since 2011. His real name is not a matter of public record, as is often the case with masked wrestlers in Mexico, where their private lives are kept a secret from the wrestling fans.

== Professional wrestling career ==
=== Independent circuit (2008–present) ===
El Hijo de L.A Park started his professional wrestling career under the ring name Black Spirit on 12 August 2008 in a tag team match with Super Nova and Turbo on the Los Perros De Mal debut show going up against X-Fly, Cerebo Negro and Black thunder in a winning effort. On 27 February 2009, Black Spirit would team up with Turbo once again to beat Black Thunder and Vampiro Metalico which they won that match. On 13 December 2009 Black Spirit teamed up L.A Park and Super Parka to defeated Damian 666, Perro Aguayo Jr, and X-Fly.

=== CMLL appearances (2018–2019) ===
In 2018, El Hijo de L.A Park made his professional wrestling debut in CMLL, the oldest professional wrestling promotion in Mexico. On 14 September 2018, El Hijo de L.A Park teamed up with his father, L.A Park, and Caristico to take on Diamante Azul, King Phoenix, and Penta El Zero M at CMLL 85 Anniversario. On 19 July 2019, El Hijo de L.A Park teamed with his father again as well as with his brother, L.A. Park Jr, to take on La Bestia del Ring, Mistico & Rush.

== Championships and accomplishments ==
- Alianza Universal de Lucha Libre
  - AULL Tag Team Championship (1 time)- with L.A.Park Jr.
- Generacion XXI
  - G21 Tag Team Championship (1 time) – with L.A. Park
- Kaoz Lucha Libre
  - Kaoz Trios Championship (1 time) – with La Bestia del Ring and L.A. Park Jr.
- Lucha Libre V.I.P
  - Lucha Libre V.I.P Junior Championship (1 time)
- Major League Wrestling
  - MLW World Tag Team Championship (1 time) – with L.A. Park
- Organización Independiente de Lucha Libre
  - OILL Juniors Tag Team Tournament (2010) – with El Hijo de Dr. Wagner Jr.
- Pro Wrestling Illustrated
  - Ranked No. 149 of the top 500 singles wrestlers in the PWI 500 in 2020
- Universal Wrestling Entertainment
  - UWE Tag Team Championship (1 time) – with El Hijo del Pirata Morgan

== Luchas de Apuesta record ==
Winner (wager)	Loser (wager)	Location	Event	Date	Notes
El Hijo de L.A. Park (mask)	El Imagen (mask)	Guadalupe, Nuevo León	Live event	December 26, 2010	(Note: Three–way match, which also included El Enfermero. The three lost a Relevos Suicidas match against Fuego Latino, Silver Star and Volador Jr. and were forced to wrestle each other.)
