= Danny Casas =

Mexican professional wrestler

Personal information
- Born: Carlos Daniel Rodríguez Casas; July 13, 1986 (age 40) Mexico City, Mexico
- Family: Casas wrestling family
- Website: Facebook page

Professional wrestling career
- Ring name(s): Danny Casas; The Hammer; Rush
- Billed height: 180 cm (5 ft 11 in)
- Billed weight: 100 kg (220 lb)
- Trained by: Gran Apache; Heavy Metal; Pepe Casas
- Debut: 2004

Danny Casas (born July 13, 1986) is a third-generation professional wrestler from Mexico. His real name is Carlos Daniel Rodríguez Casas and his nickname is "El Hampon." His grandfather, Pepe Casas, started the Casas professional wrestling tradition and has been followed by his uncles José Casas Ruiz (Negro Casas), Jorge Luis Casas Ruiz (El Felino) and Erick Francisco Casas Ruiz (Heavy Metal). His championships include the IWRG Intercontinental Tag Team Championship (with Chicano) and the IWRG Junior de Juniors Championship.

== Championships and accomplishments ==
- International Wrestling Revolution Group

- IWRG Junior de Juniors Championship (1 time)
- IWRG Intercontinental Tag Team Championship (1 time) – with Chicano
- Rebelión de los Juniors: 2017

== Luchas de Apuestas record ==
Winner (wager)	Loser (wager)	Location	Event	Date	Notes
Danny Casas (hair)	Oficial 911 (hair)	Naucalpan, Mexico	IWRG Live event	December 14, 2014	
X-Fly (hair)	Danny Casas (hair)	Naucalpan, Mexico	Guerra del Golfo	March 15, 2015	
Danny Casas (hair)	X-Fly (hair)	Naucalpan, Mexico	Ruleta de la Muerte	November 29, 2015	(Note: The two lost a Relevos Suicidas tournament and were forced to fight each other. The tournament also included Diva Salvaje and Toscano, Máscara Año 2000 Jr. and Veneno and Los Traumas (Trauma I and Trauma II))
Danny Casas (hair)	Toscano (hair)	Naucalpan, Mexico	IWRG 20th Anniversary Show	January 3, 2016	
Toscano (hair)	Danny Casas (hair)	Naucalpan, Mexico	Festival de las Máscaras	June 5, 2016	(Note: This was a steel cage match)
Veneno (hair)	Danny Casas (hair)	Naucalpan, Mexico	Triangular de la Muerte	March 5, 2017	(Note: Match also included Chicano)
