= IWRG Junior de Juniors Championship =

Professional wrestling championship by International Wrestling Revolution Group

- The Championship belt

Details
- Promotion: International Wrestling Revolution Group
- Date established: February 6, 2011
- Current champion: Villano V Jr.
- Date won: October 12, 2025
Statistics
- First champion: Hijo de Pirata Morgan
- Most reigns: Hijo de Pirata Morgan (3 reigns)
- Longest reign: El Hijo de Fishman (641 days)
- Shortest reign: Hijo de Pirata Morgan (7 days)
- Oldest champion: Oficial Factor (35 years)

The IWRG Junior de Juniors Championship is a professional wrestling championship promoted by the Mexican professional wrestling promotion International Wrestling Revolution Group (IWRG) since February 2011. The championship is only for second or third generation wrestlers; this includes wrestlers with storyline relationships such as El Hijo del Espectro Jr., who is not related to Espectro Jr. in real life but is paying for the use of the name. IWRG never revealed how Oficial Factor qualified as a second generation wrestler.

The current champion is Villano V Jr. who defeated El Hijo de Canis Lupus to win the championship on October 12, 2025. As it is a professional wrestling championship, the title was not won not by actual competition, but by a scripted ending to a match determined by the bookers and match makers. (Note: Hornbaker (2016) p. 550: "Professional wrestling is a sport in which match finishes are predetermined. Thus, win–loss records are not indicative of a wrestler's genuine success based on their legitimate abilities – but on now much, or how little they were pushed by promoters") On occasion the promotion declares a championship vacant, which means there is no champion at that point in time. This can either be due to a storyline, (Note: Duncan & Will (2000) p. 271, Chapter: Texas: NWA American Tag Team Title [World Class, Adkisson] "Championship held up and rematch ordered because of the interference of manager Gary Hart") or real life issues such as a champion suffering an injury being unable to defend the championship, (Note: Duncan & Will (2000) p. 20, Chapter: (United States: 19th Century & widely defended titles – NWA, WWF, AWA, IW, ECW, NWA) NWA/WCW TV Title "Rhodes stripped on 85/10/19 for not defending the belt after having his leg broken by Ric Flair and Ole & Arn Anderson") or leaving the company. (Note: Duncan & Will (2000) p. 201, Chapter: (Memphis, Nashville) Memphis: USWA Tag Team Title "Vacant on 93/01/18 when Spike leaves the USWA.")

== Championship tournaments ==
IWRG held a one night, ten-man tournament on February 6, 2011, to determine the first ever IWRG Junior de Junior Champion. The tournament started with a Battle royal where the last two in the ring would advance straight to the semi-finals. El Hijo de Pirata Morgan and Trauma I advanced to the semi-final match and El Hijo de Pirata Morgan defeated El Hijo de L.A. Park in the final.

| Wrestler | Father |
|---|---|
| Bestia 666 | Damián 666 |
| Carta Brava Jr. | Carta Brava |
| Hijo del Canek | El Canek |
| El Hijo de L.A. Park | L. A. Park |
| Hijo de Máscara Año 2000 | Máscara Año 2000 |
| El Hijo de Pirata Morgan | Pirata Morgan |
| Kung Fu Jr. | Kung Fu |
| Bobby Lee Jr. | Bobby Lee |
| Trauma I | Negro Navarro |
| Ultraman Jr. | Ultraman |

First round
1 | El Hijo de L.A. Park | W
16 | Carta Brava Jr.
8 | Bestia 666 | W
9 | Kung Fu Jr.
5 | Hijo de Máscara Año 2000 | W
12 | Bobby Lee Jr.
4 | Ultraman Jr. | W
13 | Hijo del Canek
6
11
3
14
7
10
2
15

Quarter-finals
El Hijo de L.A. Park | W
Bestia 666
Hijo de Máscara Año 2000 | W
Ultraman Jr.
El Hijo de Pirata Morgan
Battle Royal Bye
Trauma I
Battle Royal Bye

Semi-finals
El Hijo de L.A. Park | W
Hijo de Máscara Año 2000
El Hijo de Pirata Morgan | W
Trauma I

Final
El Hijo de L.A. Park
El Hijo de Pirata Morgan | W

== Title history ==
Key
| No. | Overall reign number |
| Reign | Reign number for the specific champion |
| Days | Number of days held |
| N/A | Unknown information |
| (NLT) | Championship change took place "no later than" the date listed |
| † | Championship change is unrecognized by the promotion |
| + | Current reign is changing daily |

| No. | Champion | Championship change | | | Reign statistics | | Notes | Ref. |
| No. | Champion | Date | Event | Location | Reign | Days | Notes | Ref. |
|---|---|---|---|---|---|---|---|---|
| 1 | El Hijo de Pirata Morgan | February 6, 2011 | IWRG Junior de Juniors | Naucalpan, State of Mexico | 1 | 49 | Son of Pirata Morgan; Won a 10-man tournament. | |
| 2 | Trauma I | March 27, 2011 | Rebelión de los Juniors (2011) | Naucalpan, State of Mexico | 1 | 361 | Son of Negro Navarro; Title match also included El Hijo de L.A. Park | |
| 3 | Bestia 666 | March 22, 2012 | IWRG show | Naucalpan, State of Mexico | 1 | 101 | Son of Damián 666 | |
| 4 | Hijo de Máscara Año 2000 | July 1, 2012 | IWRG show | Naucalpan, State of Mexico | 1 | 77 | Son of Máscara Año 2000 | |
| 5 | El Hijo de Pirata Morgan | September 16, 2012 | IWRG show | Naucalpan, State of Mexico | 2 | 7 | Match also included Trauma I, IWRG Rey del Ring Championship also on the line. | |
| 5 | Oficial Factor | September 23, 2012 | IWRG show | Naucalpan, State of Mexico | 1 | 28 | Family relationship unrevealed | |
| 6 | El Hijo de Pirata Morgan | October 21, 2012 | IWRG show | Naucalpan, State of Mexico | 3 | 72 | | |
| 7 | Oficial Factor | January 1, 2013 | IWRG 17th Anniversary Show | Naucalpan, State of Mexico | 2 | 135 | | |
| 8 | Carta Brava Jr. | May 16, 2013 | IWRG show | Naucalpan, State of Mexico | 1 | 24 | Son of Carta Brava | |
| 9 | Trauma II | June 9, 2013 | IWRG show | Naucalpan, State of Mexico | 1 | 280 | Son of Negro Navarro | |
| 10 | Súper Nova | March 16, 2014 | IWRG show | Naucalpan, State of Mexico | 1 | 525 | Son of El Texano | |
| 11 | Golden Magic | August 23, 2015 | IWRG show | Naucalpan, State of Mexico | 1 | 217 | Son of Mr. Magia | |
| 12 | Danny Casas | March 23, 2016 | IWRG show | Naucalpan, State of Mexico | 1 | 112 | Part of the Casas wrestling family | |
| 13 | El Hijo de Dos Caras | July 17, 2016 | Cabellera vs. Cabellera | Naucalpan, State of Mexico | 1 | 224 | Son of Dos Caras | |
| 13 | Herodes Jr. | February 26, 2017 | IWRG show | Naucalpan, State of Mexico | 1 | 210 | Son of Herodes | |
| 14 | Máscara Año 2000 Jr. | September 24, 2017 | IWRG show | Naucalpan, State of Mexico | 1 | 392 | Son of Máscara Año 2000 | |
| 15 | El Hijo del Alebrije | March 25, 2018 | IWRG show | Naucalpan, State of Mexico | 1 | 168 | Nephew of Alebrije / Kraneo | |
| 16 | El Hijo de Canis Lupus | September 9, 2018 | Caravana de Campeones | Naucalpan, State of Mexico | 1 | 203 | Son of Golpeador; storyline son of Canis Lupus | |
| 16 | El Hijo del Médico Asesino | March 31, 2019 | IWRG show | Naucalpan, State of Mexico | 1 | 336 | Related to Médico Asesino | |
| 17 | Fresero Jr. | March 1, 2020 | IWRG show | Naucalpan, State of Mexico | 1 | 431 | Son of AAA referee, El Fresero | |
| 18 | El Hijo del Espectro Jr. | May 6, 2021 | IWRG show | Naucalpan, State of Mexico | 1 | 70 | Storyline son of Espectro Jr. | |
| 19 | El Hijo del Alebrije | July 15, 2021 | IWRG Thursday Night Wrestling | Naucalpan, State of Mexico | 2 | 255 | | |
| 20 | Dick Angelo 3G | March 27, 2022 | IWRG show | Naucalpan, State of Mexico | 1 | 280 | Grandson of Dick Angelo | |
| 21 | El Hijo de Fishman | January 1, 2023 | IWRG Guerreros De Acero 2023 | Naucalpan, State of Mexico | 1 | 641 | Son of Fishman. This was a steel cage match. | |
| 22 | El Hijo de Canis Lupus | October 3, 2024 | IWRG Thursday Night Wrestling | Naucalpan, State of Mexico | 2 | 374 | Son of Golpeador; storyline son of Canis Lupus | |
| 23 | Villano V Jr. | October 12, 2025 | IWRG show | Naucalpan, State of Mexico | 1 | 404+ | Son of Villano V | |

== Combined reigns ==
As of November 20, 2026.

| † | Indicates the current champion |

| Rank | Wrestler | No. of reigns | Combined days |
|---|---|---|---|
| 1 | El Hijo de Fishman | 1 | 641 |
| 2 | El Hijo de Dos Caras | 2 | 577 |
| 3 | Super Nova | 1 | 526 |
| 4 | Fresero Jr. | 1 | 431 |
| 5 | El Hijo del Alebrije | 2 | 423 |
| 6 | Máscara Año 2000 Jr. | 1 | 392 |
| 7 | Villano V Jr. † | 1 | 404+ |
| 8 | Trauma I | 1 | 361 |
| 9 | El Hijo de Médico Asesino | 1 | 336 |
| 10 | Trauma II | 1 | 280 |
| 11 | Dick Angelo 3G | 1 | 280 |
| 12 | Golden Magic | 1 | 217 |
| 13 | Herodes Jr. | 1 | 210 |
| 14 | El Hijo de Canis Lupus | 1 | 203 |
| 15 | Oficial Factor | 2 | 163 |
| 16 | Hijo de Pirata Morgan | 3 | 128 |
| 17 | Danny Casas | 1 | 112 |
| 18 | Bestia 666 | 1 | 101 |
| 19 | Hijo de Máscara Año 2000 | 1 | 77 |
| 20 | El Hijo del Espectro Jr. | 1 | 70 |
| 21 | Carta Brava Jr. | 1 | 24 |
