= El Hijo de Pirata Morgan =

Mexican wrestler (born 1992)

Hijo de Pirata Morgan
Personal information
- Born: Antheus Ortiz Chávez; February 28, 1992 (age 34) Mexico City, Mexico

Professional wrestling career
- Ring name(s): Drake Morgan; Hijo de Pirata Morgan; Némesis
- Billed height: 1.70 m (5 ft 7 in)
- Billed weight: 80 kg (176 lb)
- Trained by: Pirata Morgan; Rey Pantera; Super Crazy; Gran Apache
- Debut: March 25, 2005

Antheus Ortiz Chávez (born February 28, 1992), better known under the ring name Hijo de Pirata Morgan, is a Mexican professional wrestler, currently working for the Mexican promotion International Wrestling Revolution Group (IWRG) portraying a técnico ("Good guy") wrestling character. Hijo de Pirata Morgan's real name was not a matter of public record until March 16, 2013, where he lost his wrestling mask and had to reveal his real name. This is often the case with masked wrestlers in Mexico where their private lives are kept a secret from the professional wrestling fans while they are masked. He is legitimately the son of professional wrestler Pedro Ortiz Villanueva, better known as Pirata Morgan, and not a storyline family relationship as it sometimes the case in Lucha Libre.

== Personal life ==
Antheus Ortiz Chávez is the son of Pedro Ortiz Villanueva, who is better known as Pirata Morgan. He is the brother of professional wrestler Pirata Morgan, Jr. and female wrestler Perla Negra ("Black Pearl"). He is the nephew of professional wrestlers Hombre Bala, Verdunga and La Marquesa and the cousin of wrestlers Rey Bucanero, Hombre Bala Jr., Corsario, Barba Roja and India Sioux. In an interview Ortiz revealed that his father had three wrestling masks made in 1992, one for his cousin Rey Bucanero, who actually wrestled as "Hijo de Pirata Morgan" at one point, one for his older brother and one for himself, even though he had not yet been born. The mask was a reminder and a goal for him growing up, aspiring to one day become a pro wrestler like his father. His father insisted on his son getting an education before becoming a pro wrestler, but he decided to secretly train to show his determination and dedication. Once his father saw his son's desire he furthered his training, allowing him to train in the AAA wrestling school that he ran at the time.

== Professional wrestling career ==
=== International Wrestling Revolution Group (2005–2015) ===
He made his debut in 2005, at the age of only 13, working under a mask as the ring character Némesis for International Wrestling Revolution Group (IWRG). There is some confusion about the name as there was also a wrestler in AAA who used the name "Némesis" around the same time as well as after Hijo de Pirata Morgan began working under a different name, it is possible that he initially played the role in AAA as well, especially since his father was running the AAA wrestling school at the time. Hijo de Pirata Morgan has stated that he was at Triplemanía XIV, but it is unclear if he meant as Nemesis or if he accompanied his father for a match. As Nemesis he teamed up with Kaleth and Pirata Morgan, Jr. to form a trio called Los Jinetes de Apocalipsis ("The Horsemen of the Apocalypse"). He was one of 30 participants in the 2005 Rey del Ring tournament, but was eliminated after only being in the ring for a short period of time. On December 5, 2005, Némesis participated in IWRG's annual El Castillo del Terror ("Castle of Terror") event, a multi-man steel cage match where the last person in the cage was forced to unmask or have their hair shaved off. Némesis was one of the last two men in the ring along with Ultra Mega, with Némesis being able to escape the ring and was thus credited with unmasking Ultra Mega as per the match stipulation. In 2007 Pirata Morgan introduced a group called Los Piratas in AAA, it consisted of the former Los Jinetes de Apocalipsis as Kaleth became "Barbe Roja" ("Red Beard") and Nemesis became "Drake Morgan", all three billed as sons of Pirata Morgan, even though Kaleth/Barbe Roja was not related. A few months later Drake Morgan" was renamed "Hijo de Pirata Morgan. It is believed that someone else took over the Némesis character in IWRG (and perhaps even AAA) at this event. Hijo de Pirata Morgan, Pirata Morgan, Jr. and Barbe Roja continued to work as Los Piratas in the first or second match of the night, working against young tecnico (wrestlers who portray the "good guys") such as Real Fuerza Aérea. Los Piratas teamed up with Pirata Morgan for the 2008 Reina de Reinas ("Queen of Queens") show, losing to Real Area Fuerza. Los Piratas teamed up with Pirata Morgan for the 2008 Reina de Reinas ("Queen of Queens") show, losing to the Real Fuerza Aérea team of Gato Eveready, Aero Star, El Ángel and Pegasso. In late 2008 Barba Roja and El Hijo de Pirata Morgan were both released from AAA andin early 2009 Pirata Morgan, along with Pirata Morgan, Jr. also left AAA, citing his dissatisfaction with the direction of the company in recent years.

Following his AAA departure he became a regular worker for IWRG again as well as working for a number of promotions on the Mexican Independent circuit. On November 5, 2009, Hijo de Pirata Morgan participanted in his first IWRG tournament under that ring name as he teamed up with Oficial AK-47 for a Ruleta de la Muerte (Spanish for "Roulette of Death") tournament, in which tag teams face off in a single elimination tournament, but unlike traditional tournaments it is the losing team that advances in the tournament and the losing team in the finals would be forced to face off against each other in a Luchas de Apuestas match. In the first round the team lost to El Hijo del Diablo and Zatura, in the second round they lost to Arlequin Negro and Ultraman, Jr. to go to the finals. In the final match Hijo de Pirata and AK-47 defeated Chico Che and Gringo Loco to keep their masks safe. IWRG held a special tournament to identify the next IWRG Intercontinental Tag Team Champions with a tournament where all the teams were fathers and sons. Hijo de Pirata Morgan teamed up with Pirata Morgan to defeat Brazo de Plata and Brazo de Plata, Jr., Los Bravos (Fuerza Guerrera and Juventud Guerrera) and the team of Máscara Año 2000 and Máscara Año 2000, Jr., to qualify for the finals of the tournament. In the finals Los Piratas defeated the team of Negro Navarro and Trauma I, marking the first championship victory for Hijo de Pirata Morgan. The team would hold the title for 139 days, until June 20, 2010, when Los Junior Dinamitas (Máscara Año 2000, Jr. and Hijo de Cien Caras) won the title from them. The storyline feud with Los Junior Dinamitas led to Hijo de Pirata and both Dinamitas being part of IWRG's 2010 Castillo del Terror ("Castle of Terror") event where all 10 competitors risked their match. None of the three were involved in the finish as they escaped the steel cage early in the match. On November 14, 2010 Los Piratas regained the IWRG Tag Team Championship from Los Junior Dinamitas. At some point in 2010 Hijo de Pirata won the UWF United States Championship during a tour of Texas, the title was defended in IWRG as well, both as the United States championship and as the IWRG Texas Heavyweight Championship. On December 19, 2010, in yet another chapter of the long running feud with Los Dinamitas Máscara Año 2000, Jr. won the title from Hijo de Pirata. In early 2011 Hijo de Pirata teamed up with Hammer for IWRG's first ever Torneo Proyeccion a Nuevas Promesas de la Lucha Libre ("Designing a new promise of Wrestling" Tournament), designed to identify a future headliner. The team lost in the opening round to Dinamic Black and Negro Navarro. In February 2011 IWRG created a new championship, the IWRG Junior de Juniors Championship, exclusively for second and third-generation wrestlers. The tournament saw Hijo de Pirata defeat Trauma I in the semi-final and then El Hijo de L.A. Park in the finals to become the first ever Junior de Juniors champion. A few months later Hijo de Pirata lost the title to Trauma I in a match that also included Hijo de L.A. Park where both his opponents risked their masks against Hijo de Pirata's title at the 2011 Rebelión de los Juniors show.

In September 2011 Hijo de Pirata Morgan competed in a multi-man steel cage match where the last man in the cage would be forced to either unmask or have his hair shaved off. The match also included his father as well as Pirata Morgan, Jr., Barba Roja, Bestia 666, Damián 666, Dr. Wagner, Jr., Halloween, El Hijo del Perro Aguayo, Monster Clown, Murder Clown and Psycho Clown. The match came down to Hijo de Pirata and his father as the last two men in the ring. Which led to Pirata Morgan allowing his son to keep his mask, electing to have his hair shaved off instead. Los Piratas tag team championship reign came to an end after 490 days, when Negro Navaro and Trauma I (collectively known as La Dinastia Muerte; "The Dynasty of Death") defeated them on March 19, 2012. A few months later Hijo de Pirata competed in the 2012 Rey del Ring ("King of the Ring") tournament, but lost to Trauma I, the eventual tournament winner. Not long after the tournament Hijo del Pirata Morgan won IWRG's 2012 La Gran Cruzada ("The Great Crusade") tournament, which also made him the number one contender for the IWRG Rey del Ring Championship. The tournament victory led to a match against champion Oficial Factor, which Hijo de Pirata won, becoming the next Rey del Ring. On September 16, 2012, he became a double champion when he defeated El Hijo de Máscara Año 2000 to win the Junior the Juniors title in a match where the Rey del Ring title was also on the line. His reign as Junior de Junior champion only lasted 7 days as he lost to Oficial Factor in a match where both championships were on the line against Oficial Factor's mask. The storyline feud with Oficial Factor kept escalating over the fall and winter of 2012, including both of them being involved in a multi-man Steel Cage Match where the last man in the ring would lose either their championship or their mask. Both Hijo de Pirata escaped the cage, ending with El Ángel winning the IWRG Intercontinental Middleweight Championship from Oficial AK-47. On October 21, 2012, Hijo de Pirata defeated Oficial Factor to regain the IWRG Junior de Juniors Championship. The feud between Hijo de Pirata Morgan and Oficial Factor kept escalating until the two of them as well as Oficial 911 and Hijo de Máscara Año 2000 all agreed to risk their masks in a Prison Fatal steel cage match on December 2, 2012. The Prison Fata match came down to Factor and Oficial 911 after both Hijo de Pirata and Hijo de Máscara escaped the cage to protect their masks. In the end 911 managed to escape, forcing Factor to unmask. On January 1, 2013, Hijo de Pirata lost the IWRG Junior de Juniors Championship back to Oficial Factor. On February 7, 2013, El Hijo de Pirata Morgan, Pirata Morgan and Pirata Morgan, Jr. defeated Los Oficiales (Oficial 911, Oficial AK-47 and Oficial Fierro) to win the Distrito Federal Trios Championship. On March 16, 2013, Hijo de Pirata Morgan teamed up with Cassandro to compete in a Ruleta de la Muerte, losers advance tag team tournament to commemorate the retirement of Ray Mendoza, Jr. The duo lost to Rayo de Jalisco, Jr. and Máscara Año 2000 in the first round and lost to El Solar and Toscano in the second round qualifying them for the finals where the losing team would be forced to either unmask (Hijo de Pirata Morgan) or have their hair shaved off (Casando). The team faced, and lost to the team of Villano IV and Ray Mendoza, Jr. which meant Hijo de Pirata Morgan had to unmask and reveal his birthname, Antheus Ortiz Chávez, as is traditional with Luchas de Apuestas losses. On March 24, 2013 Los Piratas won the vacant IWRG Intercontinental Trios Championship, winning a four-way match against Los Oficiales (911, AK-47 and Fierro), La Familia de Tijuana (Mosco X-Fly, Super Nova and Eterno) and Comandos Elite (Rayan and Factor) and Máscara Año 2000, Jr. On May 30, 2013, Hijo de Pirata Morgan defeated Eterno to win the IWRG Intercontinental Middleweight Championship. On November 4, Los Piratas lost the IWRG Intercontinental Trios Championship to Los Poderosos (Hombre Sin Miedo, Kendor Jr. and Sobredosis), only to regain it a week later. On March 29, 2015, Morgan lost the title to Veneno. On August 9, 2015, Los Piratas lost the IWRG Intercontinental Trios Championship to La Dinastía de la Muerte (Negro Navarro, Trauma I and Trauma II). During the show Pirata Morgan introduced the newest member of Los Piratas, Barbe Roja Jr. ("Red Beard Jr.").

=== Lucha Libre AAA Worldwide (2015–present) ===
In January 2015, Morgan began working regularly for AAA, forming a rudo partnership with Electroshock.

== Championships and accomplishments ==
- International Wrestling Revolution Group
  - IWRG Intercontinental Middleweight Championship (1 time)
  - IWRG Intercontinental Tag Team Championship (1 time) – with Pirata Morgan
  - IWRG Intercontinental Trios Championship (2 times) – With Pirata Morgan and Pirata Morgan, Jr.
  - IWRG Junior de Juniors Championship (3 times)
  - IWRG Rey del Ring (2 times)
  - UWF United States Heavyweight Championship (1 time) (Note: Championship recognized by IWRG and promoted under both names on IWRG shows.)
  - La Gran Cruzada Tournament: 2012
- Mexico State Wrestling and Boxing Commission
  - Distrito Federal Trios Championship (1 time) – with Pirata Morgan and Pirata Morgan, Jr.
- Promociones HUMO
  - Copa Dinastías HUMO (2014) - with Pirata Morgan
- Universal Wrestling Entertainment
  - UWE Tag Team Championship (1 time) - with El Hijo de L.A. Park

== Luchas de Apuestas record ==
Winner (wager)	Loser (wager)	Location	Event	Date	Notes
Némesis (mask)	Ultra Mega (mask)	Naucalpan, Mexico State	Arena Naucalpan 28th Anniversary Show	December 22, 2005	(Note: Participants in a steel cage match)
Hijo de Pirata Morgan (mask)	Pirata Morgan (hair)	Ciudad Nezahualcóyotl, Mexico State	IWRG Live event	September 30, 2011	(Note: Twelve man steel cage match, which also included Barba Roja, Bestia 666, Damián 666, Dr. Wagner, Jr., Halloween, El Hijo del Perro Aguayo, Monster Clown, Murder Clown, Pirata Morgan, Jr. and Psycho Clown.)
Villano IV (mask) and Ray Mendoza, Jr. (hair)	Hijo de Pirata Morgan (mask) and Cassandro (hair)	Naucalpan, Mexico State	Rey Mendoza Jr. Retirement Show	March 16, 2013	(Note: Finals of a Ruleta de la Muerte tournament at the Rey Mendoza, Jr. retirement show.)
El Hijo de Pirata Morgan (hair)	Eterno (mask)	Naucalpan, Mexico State	IWRG Live event	August 1, 2013	(Note: Last two wrestlers in a 10-man steel cage match that also included Chessman, Cien Caras, Jr., Daga, Súper Nova, El Texano, Jr., Trauma I, Trauma II and Villano IV.)
El Hijo de Pirata Morgan (hair) and Golden Magic (mask)	Mosco X-Fly (hair) and Oficial 911 (mask)	Naucalpan, Mexico State	Arena Naucalpan 36th Anniversary Show	December 19, 2013	(Note: Elimination tag team match, also involving the team of Oficial Fierro and Trauma II.)
El Hijo de Pirata Morgan (hair)	Mosco X-Fly (hair)	Naucalpan, Mexico State	Prisión Fatal	May 25, 2014	(Note: Steel cage match, also involving Eterno and Hijo de Máscara Año 2000.)
Jean Montañez (mask)	El Hijo de Pirata Morgan (hair)	Atizapán de Zaragoza, State of Mexico	Pro Wrestling Resurrection show	September 26, 2020	
