= Súper Nova =

Mexican professional wrestler

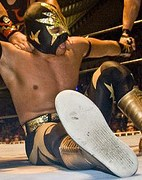
- Súper Nova in 2010

Personal information
- Born: June 29, 1986 (age 40) Guadalajara, Jalisco, Mexico

Professional wrestling career
- Ring name(s): Bengala; Dark Spider; Julio Cruz; Spider Boy; Spider Kid; Súper Nova
- Billed height: 1.66 m (5 ft 5 1/2 in)
- Billed weight: 77 kg (170 lb)
- Billed from: Guadalajara, Jalisco, Mexico
- Trained by: El Texano; Vaquero; El Satánico
- Debut: October 2002

Súper Nova (born June 29, 1986) is the ring name of a Mexican professional wrestler. He is also known for his time working for Lucha Libre AAA Worldwide (AAA) as Bengala. Super Nova is the son of Luchador El Texano and the brother of El Texano, Jr. in addition to being the cousin of another professional wrestler called Mictlán. Súper Nova's real name is not a matter of public record, as is often the case with masked wrestlers in Mexico where their private lives are kept a secret from the wrestling fans. Only his paternal and maternal surnames are a matter of public record, Aguilar Leos, as his brother's real name, Juan Aguilar Leos, is publicly known.

== Professional wrestling career ==
Super Nova grew up watching his father, El Texano, wrestle in Mexico, the United States, and Japan and later also saw his brother El Texano, Jr. turn professional in 1999. After training under his father as well as Vaquero and El Satánico for more than a year he made his debut in October 2002 as the enmascarado character "Spider Boy" (with an outfit that looked a lot like the Spider-Man character). He worked as "Spider Kid" from 2002 until 2006, then briefly as "Spider Boy" before changing his name and outfit to "Super Nova", the ring persona he's best known as today, as he began working for Consejo Mundial de Lucha Libre (CMLL) full-time. In 2007 Super Nova was one of the 16 men involved in the 2007 Reyes del Aire ("Kings of the air") Torneo cibernetico but did not win the match. Later in 2007 Super Nova participated in that year's Gran Alternativa tag team tournament. Super Nova teamed with the veteran Heavy Metal, losing to eventual winners Místico and La Sombra in the first round of the tournament.

In 2008 Super Nova began touring Europe, especially Italy, with Nu-Wrestling Evolution (NWE) while also wrestling for CMLL in Mexico. On April 19, 2008, he participated in a match to crown the inaugural NWE Cruiserweight Champion, losing to Juventud Guerrera in a match that also included Matt Cross and Pac. The following day Super Nova defeated Pac. By mid-2008, Super Nova left CMLL to work with NWE and to work on the Mexican independent circuit. He toured with NWE throughout 2008, at one point teaming with Último Dragón to defeat Dark Dragon and Spade-O. In late 2008 Super Nova began working for the newly formed Perros del Mal Producciones wrestling promotion, teaming with Black Spirit and Turbo on Los Perros' debut show to defeat Black Thunder, Cerebro Negro and X-Fly. Throughout 2009 Super Nova made regular appearances for both NWE and Perros del Mal Producciones. On November 13, 2011, Super Nova won a six-way elimination match to become the new Perros del Mal Light Heavyweight Champion. When Super Nova's brother, El Texano, Jr., jumped from CMLL to Perros del Mal Producciones in November 2011, both of the brothers joined Los Perros del Mal at an International Wrestling Revolution Group (IWRG) event on December 8. However, this partnership was soon forgotten as El Texano, Jr. went on to form a new stable named El Consejo. On March 10, El Texano, Jr. helped Super Nova retain the Perros del Mal Light Heavyweight Championship against Daga and afterward invited him to join El Consejo. Super Nova, however, refused the offer, saying he did not need anyone's help. On March 13, Super Nova, Bestia 666, Damián 666, Halloween and X-Fly announced they had quit Perros del Mal Producciones and were forming their own group of independent wrestlers, named La Familia de Tijuana. In quitting the Perros del Mal Producciones, Super Nova also vacated the Perros del Mal Light Heavyweight Championship.

On December 14, 2009, Super Nova worked a "try out" match for World Wrestling Entertainment (WWE) alongside Incognito. Both of them worked without their masks on, with Super Nova being billed as Julio Cruz. Super Nova wrestled the entire match on his own, never tagging in his partner. Shortly after the match it was announced that Incognito had signed a developmental deal with WWE following his try out match. In January 2010, it was reported that Super Nova had been signed to a WWE developmental contract as well and would start in WWE's Farm League Florida Championship Wrestling as soon as he fulfilled his previous contractual obligations but he never actually worked for the WWE and no explanation was given.

In 2011, Super Nova began working for the Lucha Libre USA promotion as a member of The Latin Liberators with Magno and Rocky Romero. On August 23, 2015 Golden Magic lost the IWRG Junior de Junior Championship to Golden Magic, followed by a challenge for Super Nova and Golden Magic to put their masks on the line at a future date.

In 2016, Super Nova began working for Lucha Libre AAA Worldwide (AAA) under a mask as "Bengala", a character previously portrayed by Ricky Marvin.

On July 8, 2019, Nova announced his departure from the company after three years with AAA to continue with the character of "Super Nova" on the independent circuit.

== Personal life ==
Super Nova is the youngest son of Juan Conrado Aguilar Jáuregui better known by his ring name El Texano, who wrestled from 1972 until his death in 2006. His brother, Juan Aguilar Leos, is also a professional wrestler, using the ring name El Texano, Jr. after his father. Super Nova's cousin, Jonathan de Jesus Navarro Gimenez, is also a wrestler, working under the ring name Mictlán.

== Not to be mistaken for ==
Several wrestlers have at one point in their wrestling career worked under the ring name "Super Nova"

- Mike Bucci – used the name "Super Nova" for several years in Extreme Championship Wrestling
- Mike Segura – The original Super Nova in AAA, the first Mexican to use the name
- Super Nova II – An unidentified wrestler briefly replaced Mike Segura as Super Nova
- Kevin – Briefly took over the role of Super Nova in AAA.
- A luchador of Guadalajara, remained unknown, used the identity of Super Nova.
- Super Nova – the current Luchador Super Nova, sometimes notes as "Super Nova III" but billed as "Super Nova" in all official promotional material

== Championships and accomplishments ==
- Consejo Mundial de Lucha Libre
  - CMLL Bodybuilding Contest (2006 - Beginner)
- International Wrestling Revolution Group
  - IWRG Junior de Juniors Championship (1 time)
  - El Protector (2014) – with Electro Boy
  - Rebelión de los Juniors (2014)
- Invasión Indy
  - NWA Mexico Tag Team Championship (1 time, current) - with Texano, Jr.
- Perros del Mal Producciones
  - Perros del Mal Light Heavyweight Championship (1 time)
- Xtreme Warriors Wrestling
  - XWW Cruiserweight Championship (1 time)
- Other titles
  - NWA World Light Heavyweight Championship (1 time)
  - UWA World Junior Light Heavyweight Championship (1 time)

== Luchas de Apuestas record ==
Winner (wager)	Loser (wager)	Location	Event	Date	Notes
Super Nova (mask)	Halloween (hair)	Tijuana, Baja California	Live event	May 5, 2010	(Note: Steel cage match that also included Damián 666, Lizmark Jr., El Hijo de LA Park, Groon XXX and El Oriental)
Super Nova and Neza Kid (masks)	Dr. Cerebro and Vampiro Metálico (hair)	Ciudad Nezahualcóyotl, Mexico State	Live event	January 1, 2012	
Súper Nova (mask)	Neza Kid (mask)	Nezahualcoyotl, Mexico	AAA show	January 1, 2020	
