= La Gran Cruzada (2017) =

- Official poster for the event
- Promotion: International Wrestling Revolution Group
- Date: August 20, 2017
- City: Naucalpan, State of Mexico
- Venue: Arena Naucalpan

Event chronology
← Previous; Máscara vs. Máscara	Next → Cabellera vs. Cabellera

La Gran Cruzada chronology
← Previous; La Gran Cruzada (2015)	Next → TBA

La Gran Cruzada (2017) (Spanish for "The Great Crusade") was an ajor professional wrestling supercard event produced by Mexican professional wrestling promotion International Wrestling Revolution Group (IWRG), which took place on August 20, 2017, in Arena Naucalpan, Naucalpan, State of Mexico, Mexico.

The main event of the show was the eponymous Gran Cruzada tournament, a 30-man Battle Royal with the winner earning a championship match for his weight division. Eterno outlasted everyone else and afterward announced that he was going to challenge Relámpago for the IWRG Intercontinental Middleweight Championship.

== Background ==
In 2011 the Mexican wrestling promotion International Wrestling Revolution Group (IWRG; Sometimes referred to as Grupo Internacional Revolución in Spanish) started to award a championship belt to the winner of their annual Rey del Ring ("King of the Ring") tournament that could be defended between the annual tournaments. As a result, IWRG also added an annual La Gran Cruzada ("The Great Crusade") tournament about halfway between the Rey del Ring tournaments. Like the Rey del Ring the eponymous Gran Cruzada match is a 30-man elimination match similar in concept to the WWE's annual Royal Rumble match. The winner of the Gran Cruzada tournament would become the number one contender for the Rey del Ring Championship with a title match at a later date. The La Gran Cruzada shows, as well as the majority of the IWRG shows in general, are held in "Arena Naucalpan", owned by the promoters of IWRG and their main arena. The 2017 La Gran Cruzada show was the sixth time that IWRG has promoted a show under that name. For the 2017 version of the tournament IWRG the winner would get a championship match for his weight class, instead of the traditional IWRG Rey del Ring Championship match.

== Event ==
The La Gran Cruzada event featured three professional wrestling matches with different wrestlers involved in pre-existing scripted feuds, plots and storylines. Wrestlers were portrayed as either heels (referred to as rudos in Mexico, those that portray the "bad guys") or faces (técnicos in Mexico, the "good guy" characters) as they followed a series of tension-building events, which culminated in a wrestling match or series of matches.

For the 2017 La Gran Cruzada, 30 wrestlers competed in a battle royal where a wrestler would be eliminated once he goes over the top rope and his feet touch the floor. This elimination rule meant that Aramís, Alas de Acero and Freelance all eliminated themselves when they dove out of the ring onto an opponent on the floor. The final four were Emperador Azteca, Eterno, Golden Magic and Imposible, with Eterno ending up as the winner. Following the match he announced that he was going to challenge for the IWRG Intercontinental Middleweight Championship, held by his long time rival Relámpago at the time.

== Results ==
No.	Results	Stipulations	Times
1	Lunatic Xtreme defeated Climax Jr.	Singles match	—
2	Harry The Sick and Taylor Wolf defeated Látigo and Shaolin	Best two-out-of-three falls tag team match	—
3	Eterno won La Gran Cruzada; Also in the match: El Hijo del Alebrije, Villano III Jr., Imposible, Danny Casas, Villano V Jr., Diablo Jr., El Hijo del Pantera, El Hijo de Dos Caras, Relámpago, Dinamic Black, Dragón Fly, Cerebro Negro, Aramís, Trauma I, Golden Magic, Pantera I, Acero, Trauma II, Internacional Pantera, Gallo Frances, Alas de Acero, Warrior Jr., Bombero Infernal, Emperador Azteca, Veneno, Máscara Año 2000 Jr., Freelance, El Hijo del Diablo, and Herodes Jr.	La Gran Cruzada 2017, 30-Man Battle Royal	38:57
