= IWRG La Gran Cruzada =

International Wrestling Revolution Group event series

The La Gran Cruzada (Spanish for "The Great Crusade") is a semi-regular major professional wrestling show produced and scripted by the Mexican lucha libre promotion International Wrestling Revolution Group (IWRG; sometimes referred to as Grupo Internacional Revolución in Mexico) starting in 2011. La Gran Cruzada refers both to the overall event and to the main event tournament, a 30-man tournament to determine the number one contender for the IWRG Rey del Ring Championship.

The event was first held in the fall of 2011, months after IWRG introduced the actual IWRG Rey del Ring Championship as the award for the annual Rey del Ring ("King of the Ring") tournament winner. Each winner was supposed to later receive a championship match against whomever was the reigning champion at the time. Trauma I won the 2011 La Gran Cruzada, although there are no records of him having a Rey del Ring Championship match. El Hijo de Pirata Morgan won the 2012 La Gran Cruzada and would later defeat Oficial Factor to win the Rey del Ring Championship. Mosco X-Fly won the 2015 La Gran Cruzada but never received his "reward" of an IWRG Intercontinental Heavyweight Championship match. No La Gran Cruzada was held in 2013 or 2014 and it has not been announced for 2016. A total of 94 wrestlers have worked at least one La Gran Cruzada Show.

== Event history ==
The Mexican professional wrestling promotion International Wrestling Revolution Group (IWRG) first held a La Gran Cruzada ("The Great Crusade") event in 2011, marking the beginning of La Gran Cruzada as a major IWRG show series. They used the concept again for the 2012 La Gran Cruzada show, held on August 5, 2012. With no Gran Cruzada shows in 2013 and 2014 it appeared that IWRG had abandoned the concept, but brought it back for the 2015 La Gran Cruzada show. All La Gran Cruzada shows have taken place in Arena Naucalpan, IWRG's main venue in Naucalpan, State of Mexico, Mexico. No show has been announced for 2016.

The La Gran Cruzada concept is a 30-man battle royal where wrestlers can be eliminated by pinfall, submission, count out or disqualification, similar to the annual IWRG Rey del Ring ("King of the Ring") tournament. In 2015 the field was reduced from 30 to 20 wrestlers without an explanation. The format of the match matched that of the Rey del Ring and was also used to determine who the next number one contender to the IWRG Rey del Ring Championship would be. The concept was introduced the same year that IWRG decided to turn the Rey del Ring into an actual championship, complete with a belt that could be defended in between their annual Rey del Ring tournaments, using La Gran Cruzada to push the importance of the Rey del Ring Championship. The 2015 La Gran Cruzada deviated from the previous format, not just in numbers but also in the fact that the winner would not be given a match for the Rey del Ring Championship, but for the IWRG Intercontinental Championship appropriate to the winner's weight class. For wrestlers officially weigh less than 70 kg (150 lb) would challenge for the IWRG Intercontinental Lightweight Championship, wrestlers between 70 kg (150 lb) and 78 kg (172 lb) could challenge for the IWRG Intercontinental Welterweight Championship, wrestlers between 78 kg (172 lb) and 87 kg (192 lb) could challenge for the IWRG Intercontinental Middleweight Championship and wrestler weighing over 105 kg (231 lb) would challenge for the IWRG Intercontinental Heavyweight Championship. (Note: IWRG never specified what championship a wrestler weighting between 87 kg (192 lb) and 105 kg (231 lb) was eligible for.)

Trauma I was the first La Gran Cruzada winner, but there are no records of him ever wrestling Pantera, the then-reigning IWRG Rey de Reyes Championship for the actual championship. The 2012 La Gran Cruzada winner, El Hijo de Pirata Morgan (Literally "The Son of Pirata Morgan) would defeat the reigning champion, Oficial Factor to win the championship on August 12, 2012 – a week after the La Gran Cruzada tournament. His reign with the championship only lasted 42 days before Oficial Factor regained the championship, making El Hijo de Pirata Morgan the shortest reigning IWRG Rey del Ring Champion in the history of the championship. In 2015 Mosco X-Fly won the tournament and with that the rights to challenge for the IWRG Intercontinental Heavyweight Championship, then held by El Hijo de Dos Caras. While a championship match was scheduled for September 13, 2015. The match was canceled on the night of the show when El Hijo de Dos Caras did not show up, citing an injury. X-Fly did not work the show either. Mosco X-Fly never received a match for the IWRG Intercontinental Heavyweight Championship.

A total of 94 wrestlers have competed in 13 different matches split between the three shows (4 matches in 2011 and 2012, 5 matches in 2015). No female wrestlers or Mini-Estrellas have competed on any of the La Gran Cruzada shows. Five wrestlers in total have appeared on all three shows Black Terry, El Diablo Jr. I, Eterno, Golden Magic and Oficial 911. El Diablo Jr. I worked both the 2011 and 2012 La Gran Cruzada under the ring name "Dragón Celestial" and the 2015 show under his new name. Chicano is the only other wrestler to work two shows under different names, as Bugambilia del Norte, an Exotico character, and later on as Chicano.

== La Gran Cruzada tournament winners ==
Year	Winner	Ref(s)
2011	Trauma I	
2012	El Hijo de Pirata Morgan	
2015	Mosco X-Fly	
2017	Eterno	

== Dates, venues, and main events ==
Event	Date	City	Venue	Main event	Ref(s)
2011	November 13, 2011	Naucalpan, Mexico State	Arena Naucalpan	30-man La Gran Cruzada	
2012	August 5, 2012	Naucalpan, Mexico State	Arena Naucalpan	30-man La Gran Cruzada	
2015	September 6, 2015	Naucalpan, Mexico State	Arena Naucalpan	20-man La Gran Cruzada	
2017	August 20, 2017	Naucalpan, Mexico State	Arena Naucalpan	30-man La Gran Cruzada	
