= IWRG Triangular de la Muerte (March 2017) =

2017 International Wrestling Revolution Group event

- Official poster for the event
- Promotion: International Wrestling Revolution Group
- Date: March 5, 2017
- City: Naucalpan, State of Mexico, Mexico
- Venue: Arena Naucalpan

Event chronology
← Previous; El Protector	Next → Rebelión de los Juniors

Triangular de la Muerte chronology
← Previous; 2016	Next → —

IWRG Triangular de la Muerte (March 2017) (Spanish for "Triangle of Death") was a major professional wrestling event that was scripted and produced by the lucha libre wrestling company International Wrestling Revolution Group (IWRG; sometimes also referred to as Grupo Internacional Revolución in Spanish) that took place on March 5, 2017, in IWRG's home arena Arena Naucalpan in Naucalpan, State of Mexico, Mexico.

The title of the show referred to the three-way Lucha de Apuestas, hair vs. hair vs. hair match, main event of the show between Danny Casas, Veneno and Chicano. Chicano escaped the match by pinning Veneno, then Veneno ended up winning the match by defeating Danny Casas. After the match Casas was shaved bald as a result. The show featured six additional matches.

== Background ==
In Lucha libre the wrestling mask holds a sacred place, with the most anticipated and prestigious matches being those where a wrestler's mask is on the line, a so-called Lucha de Apuestas, or "bet match" where the loser would be forced to unmask in the middle of the ring and state their birth name. Winning a mask is considered a bigger accomplishment in lucha libre than winning a professional wrestling championship and usually draws more people and press coverage. Losing a mask is often a watershed moment in a wrestler's career, they give up the mystique and prestige of being an enmascarado (masked wrestler) but usually come with a higher than usual payment from the promoter.

== Event ==
IWRG's March 2017 Triangular de la Muerte show featured seven professional wrestling matches with different wrestlers involved in pre-existing scripted feuds, plots and storylines. Wrestlers portrayed either heels (referred to as rudos in Mexico, those that portray the "bad guys") or faces (técnicos in Mexico, the "good guy" characters) as they followed a series of tension-building events, which culminated in a wrestling match or series of matches.

In the third match of the night, the team of Black Dragón and Pantera defeated the then-reigning IWRG Intercontinental Tag Team Champions Black Terry and Diablo Jr. in a non-title match. After their victory, Pantera challenged the team for a championship match, which Diablo Jr. agreed to for the following week. In the fourth match of the night IWRG Intercontinental Middleweight Champion Relámpago successful defended his championship against Apolo Estrada Jr.

For the main event, Triangular de la Muerte ("Triangle of Death") match the first wrestler to pin an opponent would escape the match without having his hair shaved off, whoever gets the second pinfall would win the match, and force his opponent to have all his hair shaved off per the Lucha de Apuestas, or "bet match", stipulation of the main event. Chicano pinned Veneno early on in the match, leaving Veneno and Chicano's former IWRG Intercontinental Tag Team Championship Danny Casas to finish the match. In the end, Veneno overcame the odds after having lost the first fall and pinned Casas. Afterward, Danny Casas knelt in the middle of the ring as his hair was shaved off.

== Results ==
No.	Results	Stipulations
1	Átomo defeated Shadow Boy	Singles match
2	Kanon defeated Picudo Jr.	Singles match
3	Black Dragón and Pantera defeated Black Terry and Diablo Jr.	Tag team match
4	Relámpago (c) defeated Apolo Estrada Jr.	Singles match for the IWRG Intercontinental Middleweight Championship
5	La Dinastia de la Muerte (Negro Navarro, Trauma I, and Trauma II) defeated Herodes Jr., Máscara Año 2000 Jr., and Tigre del Ring	Six-man tag team match
6	Mr. Electro defeated Hip Hop Man	Singles match
7	Veneno defeated Danny Casas, also in the match: Chicano	Lucha de Apuestas, hair vs. hair vs. hair match
(c) / – the champion(s) heading into the match
