= La Gran Cruzada (2015) =

2015 International Wrestling Revolution Group event

- Official poster for the show depicting many competitors in the main event and more.
- Promotion: International Wrestling Revolution Group
- Date: September 6, 2015
- City: Naucalpan, State of Mexico
- Venue: Arena Naucalpan

Event chronology
← Previous; Triangular de la Muerte	Next → Caravana de Campeones

IWRG La Gran Cruzada chronology
← Previous; 2012	Next → —

La Gran Cruzada (2015) (Spanish for "The Great Crusade") was an annual major professional wrestling event produced by Mexican professional wrestling promotion International Wrestling Revolution Group (IWRG), that took place on September 6, 2015 in Arena Naucalpan, Naucalpan, State of Mexico, Mexico. The main event of the show was the eponymous Gran Cruzada tournament, a 20-man Battle Royal with the winner earning a championship match for the division he competes in.

== Production ==
=== Background ===
In 2011 the Mexican wrestling promotion International Wrestling Revolution Group (IWRG; Sometimes referred to as Grupo Internacional Revolución in Spanish) started to award a championship belt to the winner of their annual Rey del Ring ("King of the Ring") tournament that could be defended between the annual tournaments. As a result, IWRG also added an annual La Gran Cruzada ("The Great Crusade") tournament about halfway between the Rey del Ring tournaments. Like the Rey del Ring the eponymous Gran Cruzada match is a 30-man elimination match similar in concept to the WWE's annual Royal Rumble match. The winner of the Gran Cruzada tournament would become the number one contender for the Rey del Ring Championship with a title match at a later date. The La Gran Cruzada shows, as well as the majority of the IWRG shows in general, are held in "Arena Naucalpan", owned by the promoters of IWRG and their main arena. The 2015 La Gran Cruzada show will be the fifth time that IWRG has promoted a show under that name. For the 2015 version IWRG changed the reward for winning the match, indicating that Ricky Cruzz would not be available for a title match in the foreseeable future.

=== Storylines ===
The Gran Cruzada event featured a number of professional wrestling matches with different wrestlers involved in pre-existing scripted feuds, plots and storylines. Wrestlers portrayed themselves as either heels (referred to as rudos in Mexico, those that portray the "bad guys") or faces (técnicos in Mexico, the "good guy" characters) as they followed a series of tension-building events, which culminated in a wrestling match or series of matches.

== Results ==
No.	Results	Stipulations
1	Acero and Picudo Jr. defeated Kanon and Black Niko	Best two-out-of-three falls tag team match
2	Atomic Star, Ram El Carnero and Vortize defeated Dragón Bane, Eternus and Omega	Best two-out-of-three falls six-man "Lucha Libre rules" tag team match
3	Emperador Azteca and Los Lion Brothers (Metaleón and Mr. Leo) defeated El Diablo Jr. I, Hip Hop Man and Imposible	Best two-out-of-three falls six-man "Lucha Libre rules" tag team match
4	Hijo del Pantera, Pantera and Pantera I defeated Black Terry, Freelance and Mike Segura	Best two-out-of-three falls six-man "Lucha Libre rules" tag team match
5	Mosco X-Fly won La Gran Cruzada; Also in the match: Shu el Guerrero, Oficial 911, Máscara Sagrada, El Hijo del Diablo, Canis Lupus, Golden Magic, Veneno Danny Casas, El Golpeador, Leo, El Hijo del Dr. Wagner Jr., Eterno, Súper Nova, Negro Navarro, Relámpago, El Hijo de Dos Caras, Oficial Rayan, Oficial Spector, and Rafy	La Gran Cruzada 2015, 20-Man Battle Royal
