= IWRG Cabellera vs. Cabellera (September 2017) =

2017 International Wrestling Revolution Group event

- Official poster for the event.
- Date: September 3, 2017
- City: Naucalpan, State of Mexico
- Venue: Arena Naucalpan

Event chronology
← Previous; La Gran Cruzada	Next → Caravana de Campeones

IWRG Lucha de Apuestas chronology
← Previous; August 2017	Next → February 2018

The IWRG Cabellera vs. Cabellera (September 2017) (Spanish for "Hair vs. Hair") show was a major lucha libre event produced and scripted by Mexican professional wrestling promotion International Wrestling Revolution Group (IWRG), that took place on September 3, 2017 in Arena Naucalpan, Naucalpan, State of Mexico, Mexico. The focal point of the Cabellera vs. Cabellera series of shows is one or more traditional Lucha de Apuestas, or "Bet matches", where all competitors in the match risk their hair on the outcome of the match. The Lucha de Apuestas is considered the most prestigious match type in lucha libre, especially when a wrestlers mask is on the line, but the "hair vs. hair" stipulation is held in almost as high regard.

For the September 2017 Cabellera vs. Cabellera event IWRG veteran Bombero Infernal faced off against Eterno. Eterno defeated the veteran Bombero Infernal, forcing him to have all his hair shaved off as a result. In the semi-main event match the father/son team Los Warriors (Black Warrior and Warrior Jr. defeated Black Terry and Diablo Jr. to win the IWRG Intercontinental Tag Team Championship for the first time. The show included five additional matches

== Background ==
In Lucha libre the wrestling mask holds a sacred place, with the most anticipated and prestigious matches being those where a wrestler's mask is on the line, a so-called Lucha de Apuestas, or "bet match" where the loser would be forced to unmask in the middle of the ring and state their birth name. Winning a mask is considered a bigger accomplishment in lucha libre than winning a professional wrestling championship and usually draws more people and press coverage. Losing a mask is often a watershed moment in a wrestler's career, they give up the mystique and prestige of being an enmascarado (masked wrestler) but usually come with a higher than usual payment from the promoter. By the same token a wrestler betting his hair in a Lucha de Apuestas is seen as highly prestigious, usually a step below the mask match.

== Event ==
The September 2017 Cabellera vs. Cabellera event featured seven professional wrestling matches with different wrestlers involved in pre-existing scripted feuds, plots and storylines. Wrestlers were portrayed as either heels (referred to as rudos in Mexico, those that portray the "bad guys") or faces (técnicos in Mexico, the "good guy" characters) as they followed a series of tension-building events, which culminated in a wrestling match or series of matches.

The third match of the night was announced as a "Super Libre" match, a hardcore wrestling match supposedly with no rules. For unexplained reasons Demonio Infernal was disqualified, giving the match to Lunatic Xtreme. The fifth match of the night was a non-title match between IWRG Rey del Ring Champion Imposible and third-generation wrestler Villano III Jr. Even though Villano III Jr. lost the match he still made a challenge for the Rey del Ring championship, a challenge that Imposible did not agree to that night.

In the sixth match, the semi-main event the team of Black Terry and Diablo Jr. defended the IWRG Intercontinental Tag Team Championship against the father/son team of Black Warrior and Warrior Jr., collectively known as "Los Warriors". Terry and Diablo Jr's reign lasted 190 days in total as Los Warriors pinned them to become the 31st team to hold the championship. The ongoing storyline between veteran Bombero Infernal and the much younger Eterno was on full display as Eterno kept mocking Bombero throughout the match. By the end of the match both competitors were covered in blood as a result of several brutal moves. In the end Eterno pinned Bomber Infernal and celebrated while Bombero Infernal had all his hair shaved off as a result of the stipulations.

== Results ==
No.	Results	Stipulations
1	Fly Tiger defeated Guerrero 2000	Singlesmatch
2	Power Bull and Skanda defeated Ángel Oriental and Celestial Boy	tag team match
3	Lunatic Xtreme defeated Demonio Infernal by disqualification	Super Libre match
4	Gallo Frances, El Hijo del Pantera, and Internacional Pantera defeated Aramis, Dragón Fly, and Freelance	Six-man tag team match
5	Imposible defeated Villano III Jr.	Singles match
6	Los Warriors (Black Warrior and Warrior Jr.) defeated Black Terry and Diablo Jr. (c)	Tag team match for the IWRG Intercontinental Tag Team Championship
7	Ricky Marvin defeated Dr. Cerebro	Lucha de Apuestas, hair vs. hair match
(c) / – the champion(s) heading into the match
