= La Gran Cruzada (2011) =

2011 International Wrestling Revolution Group event

- Official poster depicting some of the Gran Cruzada competitors
- Promotion: International Wrestling Revolution Group
- Date: November 13, 2011
- City: Naucalpan, State of Mexico
- Venue: Arena Naucalpan

Event chronology
← Previous; El Castillo del Terror	Next → Copa Revolucionaria

IWRG La Gran Cruzada chronology
← Previous; First	Next → 2012

La Gran Cruzada (2011) (Spanish for "The Great Crusade") was the first annual professional wrestling event billed as La Gran Cruzada produced by Mexican professional wrestling promotion International Wrestling Revolution Group (IWRG). The event took place on November 13, 2011 in Arena Naucalpan, Naucalpan, State of Mexico, Mexico, IWRG's main venue. The main event of the show was the eponymous La Gran Cruzada tournament, which was 30-man Battle Royal with the winner being named the number one contender for the Rey del Ring Championship and would receive a match against Rey del Ring Champion Pantera at a later date.

== Production ==
=== Background ===
In 2011 the Mexican wrestling promotion International Wrestling Revolution Group (IWRG; Sometimes referred to as Grupo Internacional Revolución in Spanish) started to award a championship belt to the winner of their annual Rey del Ring ("King of the Ring") tournament that could be defended between the annual tournaments. As a result IWRG also added an annual La Gran Cruzada ("The Great Crusade") tournament about halfway between the Rey del Ring tournaments. Like the Rey del Ring the eponymous Gran Cruzada match is a 30-man elimination match similar in concept to the WWE's annual Royal Rumble match. The winner of the Gran Cruzada tournament would become the number one contender for the Rey del Ring Championship with a title match at a later date. The La Gran Cruzada shows, as well as the majority of the IWRG shows in general, are held in "Arena Naucalpan", owned by the promoters of IWRG and their main arena. The 2011 La Gran Cruzada show was the first time that IWRG promoted a show under that name.

=== Storylines ===
The event featured four professional wrestling matches with different wrestlers involved in pre-existing scripted feuds, plots and storylines. Wrestlers were portrayed as either heels (referred to as rudos in Mexico, those that portray the "bad guys") or faces (técnicos in Mexico, the "good guy" characters) as they followed a series of tension-building events, which culminated in a wrestling match or series of matches.

== Results ==
No.	Results	Stipulations
1	Kaving and Matrix, Jr. defeated Demente and Dragón Celestial – Two falls to zero	Best two-out-of-three falls tag team match
2	Los Gemelos Fantasticos (I and II) defeated Los Astros (Astro de Plata and Astro Rey, Jr.) – Two falls to one	Best two-out-of-three falls six-man tag team match
3	Rolling Boy and Saruman defeated King Drako and Kortiz – Two falls to one	Best two-out-of-three falls tag team match
4	Trauma I won the Gran Cruzada; Also in the match: Oficial 911, Oficial AK-47, Alan Extreme, Apolo Estrada, Jr., Avisman, Black Terry, Bugambilia del Norte, Carta Brava, Jr., Centvrión, Chico Che, Dinamic Black, El Hijo del Diablo, Eragon, Eterno, Oficial Fierro, Freeyser, Golden Magic, Halcón 2000, El Hijo de Máscara Año 2000, El Hijo de Pirata Morgan, Imposible, Machin, Máscara Año 2000, Jr., Multifacético, Oficial Rayan, Oficial Spartan, Trauma II, Tritón and Zumbi	La Gran Cruzada 2011, Rey del Ring #1 Contendership 30-Man Battle Royal
