= IWRG Máscara vs. Máscara (August 2017) =

2017 International Wrestling Revolution Group event

- Official poster for the event
- Promotion: International Wrestling Revolution Group
- Date: August 13, 2017
- City: Naucalpan, State of Mexico, Mexico
- Venue: Arena Naucalpan

Event chronology
← Previous; Legado Final	Next → La Gran Cruzada

IWRG Lucha de Apuestas chronology
← Previous; 3 vs. 3	Next → September 2017

IWRG Máscara vs. Máscara (August 2017) was a major professional wrestling event that was scripted and produced by the lucha libre wrestling company International Wrestling Revolution Group (IWRG; sometimes also referred to as Grupo Internacional Revolución in Spanish) that took place on August 13, 2017, in IWRG's home arena Arena Naucalpan in Naucalpan, State of Mexico, Mexico.

In the main event of the show, a Lucha de Apuestas or "bet match", Black Dragón defeated Gallo Frances, forcing him to unmask afterward. Gallo Frances revealed that his real name was Jérôme Motta, that he was 35 years old, and had been a wrestler for 15 years at that point in time. The show featured six additional matches.

== Background ==
In lucha libre the wrestling mask holds a sacred place, with the most anticipated and prestigious matches being those where a wrestler's mask is on the line, a so-called Lucha de Apuestas, or "bet match" where the loser would be forced to unmask in the middle of the ring and state their birth name. Winning a mask is considered a bigger accomplishment in lucha libre than winning a professional wrestling championship and usually draws more people and press coverage. Losing a mask is often a watershed moment in a wrestler's career, they give up the mystique and prestige of being an enmascarado (masked wrestler) but usually come with a higher than usual payment from the promoter.

== Event ==
IWRG's August 2017 Máscara vs. Máscara event featured seven professional wrestling matches with different wrestlers involved in pre-existing scripted feuds, plots and storylines. Wrestlers portrayed either heels (referred to as rudos in Mexico, those that portray the "bad guys") or faces (técnicos in Mexico, the "good guy" characters) as they followed a series of tension-building events, which culminated in a wrestling match or series of matches.

In the fifth match of the night El Hijo del Pantera won the match, when he tricked Emperador Aztaca into hitting the referee, causing Emperador Azteca to be disqualified. For the main event either Black Dragón or Gallo Frances would be forced to unmask due to the Lucha de Apuestas, or "bet match", stipulation. The Frenchman took the advantage early on, knocking Black Dragón around the ring, tearing at the mask and causing Black Dragón to bleed. Mid-way through the match, Black Dragón made his comeback, outwitting Gallo France to tie the match, one-fall each. In the end Black Dragón scored the third and decisive fall to win the match. After the match, Gallo Frances took off his mask and revealed that his real name was Jérôme Motta from Lyon, France. He revealed that he was 35 years old, had been a professional wrestler for 15 years at that point and spent the last year working in Mexico.

== Results ==
No.	Results	Stipulations
1	Atomic Star defeated Fly Tiger	Singles match
2	Climax and Shaolin defeated Demonio Infernal and Skanda	Tag team match
3	Bombero Infernal and Bombero Infernal Jr. defeated Eterno and Lunatic Xtreme	Tag team match
4	Los Cerebros (Cerebro Negro and Dr. Cerebro) defeated Argos and Dr. Karonte	Tag team match
5	El Hijo del Pantera defeated Emperador Azteca by disqualification	Singles match
6	Herodes Jr., Internacional Pantera, and Máscara Año 2000 Jr. defeated Dinamic Black, Golden Magic, and El Hijo de Dos Caras	Six-man tag team match
7	Black Dragón defeated Gallo Frances	Lucha de Apuestas, mask vs. mask match
