= IWRG Triangular de la Muerte (2016) =

2016 International Wrestling Revolution Group event

IWRG Triangular de la Muerte 2016
- Official poster with the main event competitors and Los Mariachis Locos
- Promotion: International Wrestling Revolution Group
- Date: February 14, 2016
- City: Naucalpan, State of Mexico
- Venue: Arena Naucalpan

Event chronology
← Previous; El Protector	Next → Rebelión de los Juniors

Triangular de la Muerte chronology
← Previous; 2015	Next → March 2017

The IWRG Triangular de la Muerte (2016) show (Spanish for "Triangle of Death") was a professional wrestling supercard event produced by Mexican professional wrestling promotion International Wrestling Revolution Group (IWRG), and took place on February 14, 2016 in Arena Naucalpan, Naucalpan, State of Mexico, Mexico.

The main event of the show featured three wrestlers, Herodes Jr., Trauma I and El Hijo de Dos Caras, competing in the Triangular de la Muerte; a three-way Luchas de Apuestas bet match. The Triangular match featured three individual matches, with the first wrestler to win two matches escaping the "Triangle". For the match Herodes Jr. put his hair on the line, Trauma I risked his match and El Hijo de Dos Casas put the IWRG Intercontinental Heavyweight Championship on the line. In the end Trauma I pinned El Hijo de Dos Caras to win the championship. The show featured four matches in addition to the Triangular de la Muerte matches.

== Production ==
=== Background ===
The Mexican wrestling promotion International Wrestling Revolution Group (IWRG; Sometimes referred to as Grupo Internacional Revolución in Spanish) has Triangular de la Muerte (Spanish for "Triangle of Death") matches on several occasions since its creation in 1997. Traditionally Luchas de Apuestas ("bet matches") are contested as either singles or tag team matches, but IWRG has used a hybrid version featuring three wrestlers or three teams all "betting" something on the match. In another deviation from tradition IWRG often chooses to have one participant risk their championship instead of their mask or their hair. Their only Triangular de la Muerte show in 2016 was held on February 14, 2016 in Arena Naucalpan, Naucalpan, State of Mexico where IWRG holds almost all of their major lucha libre shows.

=== Storylines ===
The event featured seven professional wrestling matches with different wrestlers involved in pre-existing scripted feuds, plots and storylines. Wrestlers were portrayed as either heels (referred to as rudos in Mexico, those that portray the "bad guys") or faces (técnicos in Mexico, the "good guy" characters) as they followed a series of tension-building events, which culminated in a wrestling match or series of matches.

== Event ==
In the opening match, Adrenalina and Matrix Jr. defeated Alas de Acero and Shadow Boy in two straight falls. The tecnico team of Astro, Dragón Fly, and Súper Astro Jr. defeated Argentinean Hip Hop Man and Mexicans Atomic Star and Power Bull in a Best two-out-of-three falls six-man "Lucha Libre rules" tag team match.

In the third match of the night, Los Mariachis Locos ("The Crazy Mariachi band"; El Diablo Jr., El Hijo del Diablo, and Imposible defeated Los Terribles Cerebros ("The Terrible Brains"; Black Terry, Cerebro Negro, and Dr. Cerebro) by disqualification when Los Terribles Cerebroswere disqualified for breaking the rules. Argos was originally scheduled for the fourth match of the night, but was replaced by Eterno, as Eterno teamed up with Emperador Azteca and Veneno. The makeshift team lost to Heddi Karaoui, Negro Navarro, and Trauma II as Eterno could not get along with his partners. After the match, Eterno challenged Karaoui to defend the IWRG Intercontinental Middleweight Championship against him at a later date.

The first two participants in the main event Triangular de la Muerte match were determined by a coin toss, which decided who of the three wrestlers had to sit out the first match. El Hijo de Dos Caras won the coin toss and had to wait outside the ring as Herodes Jr. and Trauma I had to wrestle each other. Herodes Jr. pinned Trauma I to win the first match, giving him the advantage going into the second match. Herodes Jr. also won the second match, this time by breaking the rules without being caught, pinning El Hijo de Dos Caras after a low blow. The third and final match of the Triangular de la Muerte saw Trauma I force El Hijo de Dos Casas to submit, making him the 21st IWRG Intercontinental Heavyweight Champion.

== Aftermath ==
Trauma I's first reign as the IWRG Intercontinental Heavyweight Champion lasted for 70 days, until he lost the championship to Máscara Año 2000 Jr. on April 24, 2016.

== Results ==
No.	Results	Stipulations
1	Adrenalina and Matrix Jr. defeated Alas de Acero and Shadow Boy	Best two-out-of-three falls tag team match
2	Astro, Dragón Fly, and Súper Astro Jr. defeated Atomic Star, Hip Hop Man, and Power Bull	Best two-out-of-three falls six-man "Lucha Libre rules" tag team match
3	Los Mariachis Locos (El Diablo Jr., El Hijo del Diablo, and Imposible) defeated Los Terribles Cerebros (Black Terry, Cerebro Negro, and Dr. Cerebro) by disqualification	Best two-out-of-three falls six-man "Lucha Libre rules" tag team match
4	Heddi Karaoui, Negro Navarro, and Trauma II defeated Emperador Azteca, Eterno, and Veneno	Best two-out-of-three falls six-man "Lucha Libre rules" tag team match
5	Herodes Jr. defeated Trauma I	Triangular de la Muerte match
6	Herodes Jr. defeated El Hijo de Dos Caras	Triangular de la Muerte match
7	Trauma I defeated El Hijo de Dos Caras (c)	Triangular de la Muerte match Lucha de Apuestas, mask vs. IWRG Intercontinental Heavyweight Championship match
(c) / – the champion(s) heading into the match
