= IWRG Triangular de la Muerte (2015) =

2015 International Wrestling Revolution Group event

- Official poster for the event depicting 6 of the main event competitors
- Promotion: International Wrestling Revolution Group
- Date: August 19, 2015
- City: Naucalpan, State of Mexico
- Venue: Arena Naucalpan

Event chronology
← Previous; Legado Final	Next → La Gran Cruzada

Triangular de la Muerte chronology
← Previous; First	Next → 2016

The IWRG Triangular de la Muerte (2015) show (Spanish for "Triangle of Death") was a professional wrestling supercard event produced by Mexican professional wrestling promotion International Wrestling Revolution Group (IWRG), and took place on August 19, 2015 in Arena Naucalpan, Naucalpan, State of Mexico, Mexico. IWRG has used the Triangular de la Muerte concept intermittently over the years, but not on a regular schedule.

The eponymous "Triangle of Death" match was a three-way, three-trios match where one wrestler would be forced to unmask at the end of the show under Lucha de Apuestas, or "bet match", rules. The trios were 1) Black Terry, Dr. Cerebro, and Eternus, 2) Atomic Star, Canis Lupus, and Eterno and 3) Oficial 911, Oficial AK-47, and Pikachu. In the end, Pikachu was forced to unmask as his team lost the match, revealing his real name in the process. The show also included a 'Copa Higher Power torneo cibernetico elimination match between trainees from IWRG's school and the "Gym Zeus" trainees and three additional matches.

== Production ==
=== Background ===
The Mexican wrestling promotion International Wrestling Revolution Group (IWRG; Sometimes referred to as Grupo Internacional Revolución in Spanish) has Triangular de la Muerte (Spanish for "Triangle of Death") matches on several occasions since its creation in 1997. Traditionally Luchas de Apuestas ("bet matches") are contested as either singles or tag team matches, but IWRG has used a hybrid version featuring three wrestlers or three teams all "betting" something on the match. In another deviation from tradition IWRG often chooses to have one participant risk their championship instead of their mask or their hair. Their only Triangular de la Muerte show in 2016 was held on February 14, 2016 in Arena Naucalpan, Naucalpan, State of Mexico where IWRG holds almost all of their major lucha libre shows.

=== Storylines ===
The event featured six professional wrestling matches with different wrestlers involved in pre-existing scripted feuds, plots and storylines. Wrestlers were portrayed as either heels (referred to as rudos in Mexico, those that portray the "bad guys") or faces (técnicos in Mexico, the "good guy" characters) as they followed a series of tension-building events, which culminated in a wrestling match or series of matches.

== Event ==
The opening match featured four women who do not regularly work for IWRG, as they have no steady women's roster, as Diosa Atenea and Sexy Girl defeated Lady Drago and Lilith Dark two falls to one. In the second match of the night the trio of Acero, Adrenalina, Guerrero 2000 defeated Blue Monsther, Omega, Voltar in the first best two-out-of-three falls six-man tag team match of the show. In the third match of the night Aramís defeated Yoruba. Enigma. Voraz and Aeroman when he pinned Aeroman.

The 2015 Copa Higher Power featured students from IWRG's wrestling school Future Idolos de Lucha Libre (FILL) and a team representing trainees from Gym ZEUS. The FILL team consisted of Alas de Acero, Aramis, Araña de Plata, Chapulin, Fresero Jr., Kanon, Shadow Boy and, Sniper while the Gym ZEUS team were represented by Atomic Fly, Espada De Plata, Fly Star, Galaxy, Keiser Drago, Marduck Jr., Salchichita, and Toxin Boy. The torneo cibernetico elimination match came down to Araña de Plata from FILL and Toxin Boy from ZEUS. Araña de Plata pinned Toxic Boy to win the match for his team.

In the Triangular de la Muerte match two well established IWRG regulars each teamed up with a relative newcomer for the match. Los Insoportables ("The Unbearable"; Canis Lupus and Eterno) teamed up with Atomic Star. Los Oficiales (Oficial 911 and Oficial AK-47) teamed up with Pikachu while Los Cerebros Negros ("The Black Brains"; Black Terry and Dr. Cerebro) teamed up with Eternus who made his debut on the show. For the first part of the match, all three teams faced off, with Los Cerebros Negos and Eternus gaining the first pinfall, which meant they survived the match without having to risk their hair. For the last match, a coin toss was used to determine the captain for each team, the person who would have to unmask or get their hair shaved off in case of a loss. Atomic Star and Pikachu were designated as the captains, the only 2 wrestlers in the match to wear a mask., During the final minutes of the match all six wrestlers were fighting outside the ring, with Eterno making sure Atomic Star returned to the ring before the count of 20, thus winning by count out. After the match, Pikachu unmasked and revealed his real name, Marco Antonio Guillen Soto, that he was 30 years old and had been a wrestler 8 years at that point in time.

== Results ==
No.	Results	Stipulations
1	Diosa Atenea and Sexy Girl defeated Lady Drago and Lilith Dark	Best two-out-of-three falls tag team match
2	Acero, Adrenalina, and Guerrero 2000 defeated Blue Monsther, Omega, and Voltar	Best two-out-of-three falls six-man "Lucha Libre rules" tag team match
3	Aramís defeated Yoruba, Aeroman, Enigma, and Voraz	5-way match
4	Team FILL (Alas de Acero, Aramis, Araña de Plata, Chapulin, Fresero Jr., Kanon, Shadow Boy, and Sniper) defeated Team Zeus (Atomic Fly, Espada de Plata, Fly Star, Galaxy, Keiser Drago, Marduck Jr., Salchichita, and Toxin Boy)	Copa Higher Power torneo cibernetico elimination match
5	Black Terry, Dr. Cerebro, and Eternus defeated Atomic Star, Canis Lupus, and Eterno; and Oficial 911, Oficial AK-47, and Pikachu	"Losing team advances" three-way six-man tag team match
6	Atomic Star (captain), Canis Lupus, and Eterno defeated Oficial 911, Oficial AK-47, and Pikachu (captain)	Best two-out-of-three falls Lucha de Apuestas, captain's hair vs. captain's hair match
