= La Gran Cruzada (2012) =

2012 International Wrestling Revolution Group event

- Official poster of the show depicting those who are about to go on the "Great Crusade"
- Promotion: International Wrestling Revolution Group
- Date: August 5, 2012
- City: Naucalpan, State of Mexico
- Venue: Arena Naucalpan

Event chronology
← Previous; Festival de las Máscaras	Next → Caravana de Campeones

IWRG La Gran Cruzada chronology
← Previous; 2011	Next → 2013

La Gran Cruzada (2012) (Spanish for "The Great Crusade") was an annual professional wrestling major event produced by Mexican professional wrestling promotion International Wrestling Revolution Group (IWRG), which took place on August 5, 2012 in Arena Naucalpan, Naucalpan, State of Mexico, Mexico. The main event of the show was the eponymous Gran Cruzada tournament, a 30-man Battle Royal with the winner being named the number one contender for the IWRG Rey del Ring Championship and would receive a match against Rey del Ring Champion Oficial Factor at a later date. The Gran Cruzada was won by Hijo de Pirata Morgan, lastly eliminating El Hijo de L.A. Park to win it. The victory played off the fact that Hijo de Pirata Morgan was the last man eliminated in the 2012 Rey del Ring tournament by Oficial Factor and had been developing a slowly escalating storyline between the two.

== Production ==
=== Background ===
In 2011 the Mexican wrestling promotion International Wrestling Revolution Group (IWRG; Sometimes referred to as Grupo Internacional Revolución in Spanish) started to award a championship belt to the winner of their annual Rey del Ring ("King of the Ring") tournament that could be defended between the annual tournaments. As a result, IWRG also added an annual La Gran Cruzada ("The Great Crusade") tournament about halfway between the Rey del Ring tournaments. Like the Rey del Ring the eponymous Gran Cruzada match is a 30-man elimination match similar in concept to the WWE's annual Royal Rumble match. The winner of the Gran Cruzada tournament would become the number one contender for the Rey del Ring Championship with a title match at a later date. The La Gran Cruzada shows, as well as the majority of the IWRG shows in general, are held in "Arena Naucalpan", owned by the promoters of IWRG and their main arena. The 2012 La Gran Cruzada show was the second time that IWRG promoted a show under that name.

=== Storylines ===
The event featured four professional wrestling matches with different wrestlers involved in pre-existing scripted feuds, plots and storylines. Wrestlers were portrayed as either heels (referred to as rudos in Mexico, those that portray the "bad guys") or faces (técnicos in Mexico, the "good guy" characters) as they followed a series of tension-building events, which culminated in a wrestling match or series of matches.

== Results ==
No.	Results	Stipulations
1	Electro Boy and Matrix, Jr. defeated Dragon Celestial and Fly Star – two falls to one	Best two-out-of-three falls tag team match
2	Infierno Kid and The Mummy defeated Galaxy and Serpiente de Oro – two falls to one	Best two-out-of-three falls six-man tag team match
3	Carta Brava, Jr. and Violencia, Jr. defeated Freelance and Golden Magic – two falls to one	Best two-out-of-three falls tag team match
4	Hijo de Pirata Morgan won the Gran Cruzada; Also in the match: 911, AK-47, Alan Extreme, Bestia 666, Black Terry, Bombero Infernal, Centvrión, Chicano, Damian 666, Danny Casas, Dinamic Black, Eita, El Aleman, El Hijo de L.A. Park, El Pantera, Eterno, Fierro, Fuerza Guerrera, Heddi Karaoui, La Cobra, Mike Segura, Multifacético, Niko, Rayan, Relampago, Spartan, Super Nova, Veneno and X-Fly	La Gran Cruzada 2012, Rey del Ring #1 Contendership 30-Man Battle Royal

=== Battle Royal elimination order ===
Order	Eliminated	By	Time
1	Mike Segura		
2	Multifacético		
3	Black Terry		
4	Alan Extreme		
5	Bombero Infernal		
6	Relampago		
7	Centvrión		
8	Danny Casas		
9	Oficial Spartan		
10	Oficial Rayan		
11	Oficial 911		
12	Oficial AK-47		
13	Oficial Fierro		
14	Eita		
15	El Aleman		
16	Eterno		
17	Chicano	Chicano (self-elimination)	
18	Fuerza Guerrera		
19	Dinamic Black		
20	La Cobra		
21	Veneno		
22	El Pantera		
23	Super Nova		
24	Niko		
25	Bestia 666		
26	X-Fly		
27	Damian 666		
28	Heddi Karaoui		
29	El Hijo de L.A. Park	Hijo de Pirata Morgan	
30	Hijo de Pirata Morgan	Winner	

== Aftermath ==
Hijo de Pirata Morgan received his match for the IWRG Rey del Ring Championship on August 12, 2012 at IWRG's Caravan de Campeones event where he defeated Oficial Factor to become the new Rey del Ring Champion. He would hold the championship for just over a month, until Oficial Factor regained the title, as well as won Hijo de Pirata Morgan's IWRG Junior de Juniors Championship on September 23, 2012.
