= WrestleMania XL =

2024 WWE premium live event

- Promotional poster featuring Seth "Freakin" Rollins, Roman Reigns, Cody Rhodes, and The Rock
- Promotion: WWE
- Brands: Raw; SmackDown
- Date: April 6–7, 2024
- City: Philadelphia, Pennsylvania
- Venue: Lincoln Financial Field
- Attendance: Night 1: 60,036; Night 2: 60,203; Combined: 120,239

WWE event chronology
← Previous; NXT Stand & Deliver	Next → Backlash

WrestleMania chronology
← Previous; 39	Next → 41

WrestleMania XL was a 2024 two-part professional wrestling premium live event (PLE) produced by WWE, held for wrestlers from the promotion's main roster brands, Raw and SmackDown. It was the 40th annual WrestleMania and took place as a two-night event on Saturday, April 6, and Sunday, April 7, 2024, at Lincoln Financial Field in Philadelphia, Pennsylvania. This was the second WrestleMania to be held in Philadelphia, after WrestleMania XV in 1999.

The card comprised a total of 14 matches, evenly divided between each night. In the main event for Night 1, The Bloodline (The Rock and Roman Reigns) defeated Cody Rhodes and Seth "Freakin" Rollins in a tag team match, which made the stipulation of the Undisputed WWE Universal Championship match on Night 2 a Bloodline Rules match; had Rhodes and Rollins won, all members of The Bloodline would have been barred from ringside during the championship match. This was also The Rock's first match since WrestleMania 32 in 2016. In other prominent matches, Sami Zayn defeated Gunther to win Raw's Intercontinental Championship, ending Gunther's record-setting 666-day reign, and in the opening bout, Rhea Ripley defeated Becky Lynch to retain Raw's Women's World Championship.

In the main event for Night 2, Cody Rhodes defeated Roman Reigns in a Bloodline Rules match to win SmackDown's Undisputed WWE Universal Championship. From WrestleMania 38 in April 2022 until WrestleMania XL, the WWE Championship and Universal Championship were held and defended together as the Undisputed WWE Universal Championship, with this defeat simultaneously ending Reigns's Universal Championship reign at a record-setting 1,316 days and his WWE Championship reign, and subsequently his undisputed championship reign, at 735 days. The Universal Championship was officially retired after Reigns's defeat and Rhodes was subsequently recognized as the WWE Champion, which became referred to as the Undisputed WWE Championship. (Note: Up until the following year's WrestleMania 41, WWE's website had mistakenly listed Rhodes as both the WWE Champion and Universal Champion, but this was corrected when Rhodes lost the Undisputed WWE Championship at that event, with the Universal Championship's official retirement coming at WrestleMania XL with Reigns recognized as its final holder.) In other prominent matches, Bayley defeated Iyo Sky to win SmackDown's WWE Women's Championship, Logan Paul defeated Randy Orton and Kevin Owens in a triple threat match to retain SmackDown's United States Championship, and in the opening bout, Drew McIntyre defeated Seth "Freakin" Rollins to win Raw's World Heavyweight Championship, after which, Damian Priest cashed in his Money in the Bank contract and defeated McIntyre to win the title.

This was the first WrestleMania held after WWE merged with the Endeavor subsidiary Ultimate Fighting Championship (UFC) in September 2023, under the banner of TKO Group Holdings. It was subsequently the first WrestleMania under TKO and the first not directly under McMahon family control. It was also the first WrestleMania to livestream on Abema in Japan and the final WrestleMania to livestream on Disney+ Hotstar in Indonesia, Binge in Australia, and the standalone WWE Network in most other international markets as WWE's content in those areas moved to Netflix in January 2025, as well as the last on SonyLIV in India, which moved to Netflix in April 2025. This was also WWE's final PLE for the tag team championships to carry a brand name. From May 2022 until WrestleMania XL, the Raw and SmackDown tag titles were held and defended together as the Undisputed WWE Tag Team Championship. They were then split at this event in a ladder match, and then a week after the event, the Raw and SmackDown tag team championships were renamed as the World Tag Team Championship and WWE Tag Team Championship, respectively.

The event received positive critical reception: Night 2's main event received critical acclaim for its storytelling and satisfying conclusion, while praise was given to all other championship matches on the card. However, critics and fans alike panned the Jey Uso vs. Jimmy Uso match.

== Production ==
=== Background ===
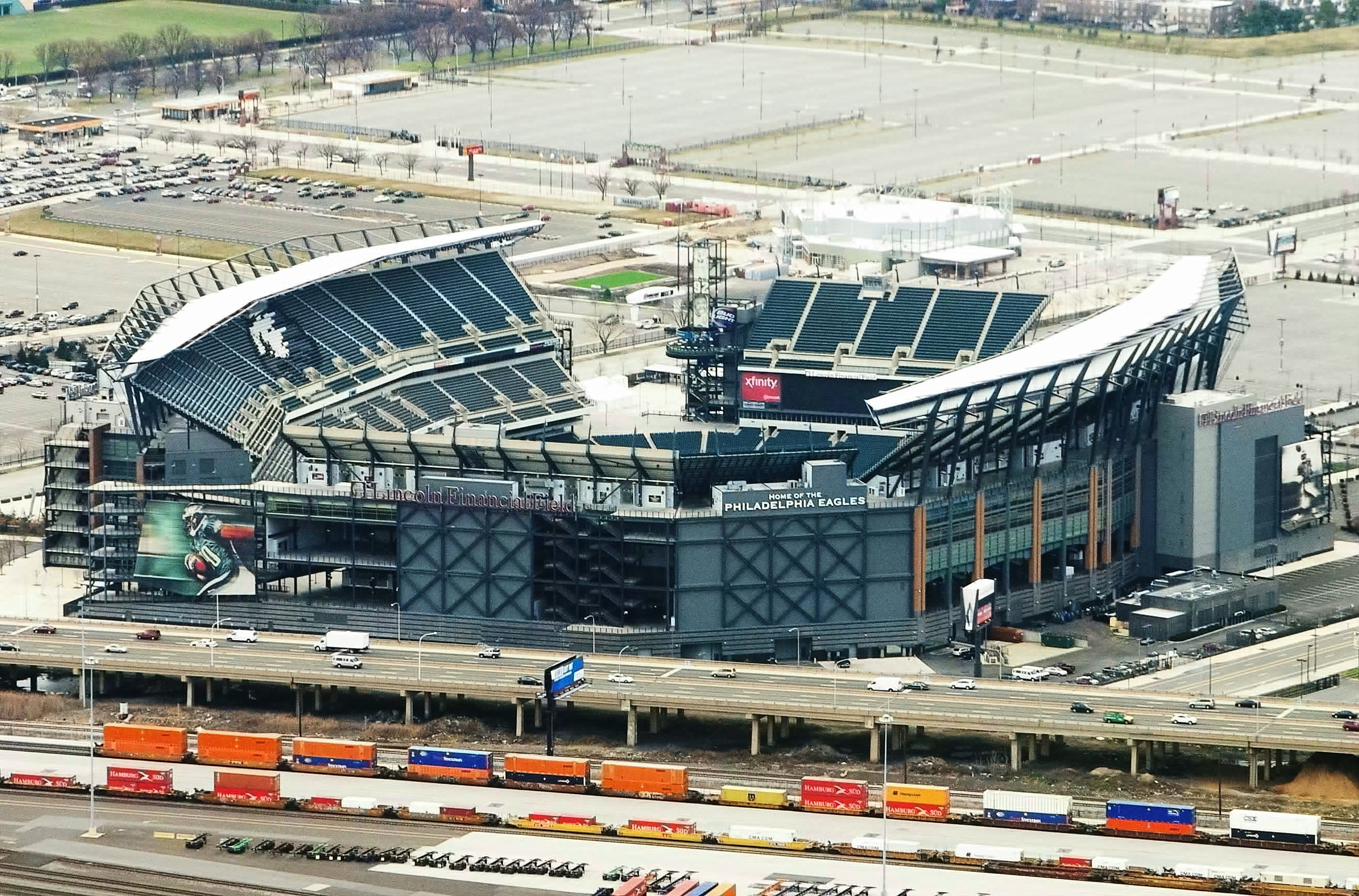
The 40th annual WrestleMania was held at Lincoln Financial Field in Philadelphia, Pennsylvania.

WrestleMania is WWE's flagship professional wrestling premium live event (PLE), having first been held in 1985. It was the company's first pay-per-view (PPV) produced and was also WWE's first major event available via livestreaming when the company launched the WWE Network in February 2014. It is the longest-running professional wrestling event in history and is held annually between mid-March to mid-April. It was the first of WWE's original four PPVs, including Royal Rumble, SummerSlam, and Survivor Series, referred to as the "Big Four", and as of August 2021, it is considered one of the "Big Five", along with Money in the Bank. WrestleMania was ranked the sixth most valuable sports brand in the world by Forbes in 2019, and has been described as the Super Bowl of sports entertainment. Much like the Super Bowl, cities bid for the right to host the year's edition of WrestleMania.

On July 27, 2022, it was announced that Lincoln Financial Field in Philadelphia, Pennsylvania, would host WrestleMania 40 on Saturday, April 6, and Sunday, April 7, 2024, and feature wrestlers from the Raw and SmackDown brand divisions. Philadelphia mayor Jim Kenney welcomed WWE to the city, noting the economic boost from visiting fans. The event's logo was then revealed on October 8 during the Extreme Rules Kickoff pre-show at the nearby Wells Fargo Center. Themed after the Liberty Bell and in the colors of the Philadelphia Eagles, it incorporated Roman numerals for the first time since WrestleMania XXX in 2014, thus officially stylizing the title as WrestleMania XL. Tickets for the event went on sale on August 18, 2023. Over 90,000 tickets were sold on the first day for both nights combined, breaking WWE's record set by the prior year's WrestleMania. The official theme song for the event was "Gasoline" by The Weeknd, which marked the fifth consecutive year that a Weeknd song was used for WrestleMania.

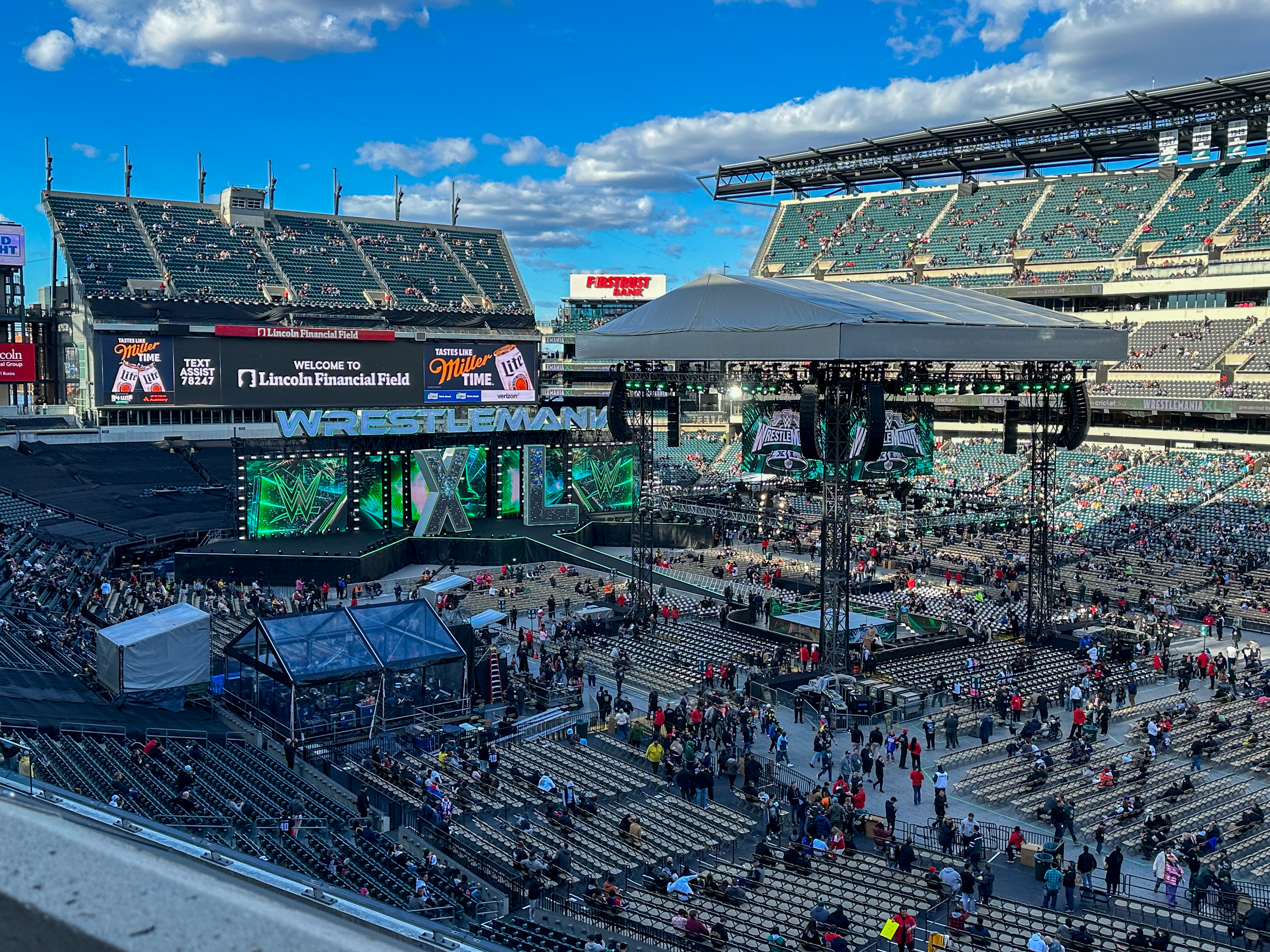
Lincoln Financial Field set up for WrestleMania XL.

From January 2023, there had been speculation that WWE had been placed up for sale. Hours before Night 2 of WrestleMania 39 began, CNBC reported via multiple sources that a deal between WWE and Endeavor, the parent company of Ultimate Fighting Championship (UFC) via Zuffa, was imminent. The deal involved a merger of WWE with the UFC into a new publicly traded company, with Endeavor holding a 51% stake. The sale was confirmed the next day on April 3, 2023, and was finalized on September 12, with WWE merging with the UFC to become divisions of TKO Group Holdings. WrestleMania XL was in turn the first WrestleMania held in which WWE was not owned and controlled by the McMahon family, and subsequently the first WrestleMania under TKO.

=== Broadcast outlets ===
Both nights of WrestleMania XL were broadcast live on traditional pay-per-view worldwide. Additionally, they were available to livestream on Peacock in the United States, SonyLIV in India, Disney+ Hotstar in Indonesia, Disney+ in the Philippines, Binge in Australia, Abema in Japan, Shahid and SSC in the Middle East and North Africa, and the WWE Network everywhere else. It was the first WrestleMania to livestream on Abema after the Japanese version of the WWE Network merged under Abema in October 2023.

Additionally, the event streamed live on Netflix in New Zealand as a technical stress test for when WWE's contract with Netflix came into effect in January 2025. As a result of said contract, all WWE Network content moved to Netflix in most countries where the former was still available as a standalone service, making WrestleMania XL the final WrestleMania to livestream on the WWE Network in those areas, as well as on Disney+ Hotstar and Binge, which also moved to Netflix at that time. A select few territories maintained the standalone WWE Network until early 2026 due to pre-existing contracts before they also merged under Netflix when those contracts expired.

=== Other WrestleMania week events ===
As part of the WrestleMania festivities, WWE held a number of events throughout the week. WWE Hall of Famer The Undertaker presented his 1 deadMAN Show on Thursday, April 4 at The Fillmore Philadelphia. From that same day through April 8 at the Pennsylvania Convention Center in Philadelphia, there was a fan convention called WWE World at WrestleMania. In partnership with Fanatics Events, the first annual WWE World was a five-day event that included interview panel sessions with WWE wrestlers, a WWE 2K24 gaming tournament, live podcast recordings, meet-and-greets with wrestlers, and a large merchandise store with various memorabilia honoring WrestleMania's 40-year history. WWE World replaced the WrestleMania Fan Axxess event that had been held at each year's WrestleMania prior to WrestleMania 36 in 2020. WWE commentator Pat McAfee also hosted live editions of his eponymous ESPN afternoon show at WWE World on Friday, April 5, and Monday April 8.

The week kicked off with a special "WrestleMania Edition" of Monday Night Raw, held at the Barclays Center in Brooklyn, New York. The night before WrestleMania XL on April 5, WWE kicked off WrestleMania Weekend with a special "WrestleMania Edition" of Friday Night SmackDown, which featured the André the Giant Memorial Battle Royal, won by Bronson Reed. Immediately after SmackDown, the 2024 WWE Hall of Fame induction ceremony commenced. The afternoon of WrestleMania Saturday, WWE's NXT brand held its annual WrestleMania Week event, Stand & Deliver. WrestleMania Week concluded with the post-WrestleMania edition of Monday Night Raw on April 8. These events were held live at the nearby Wells Fargo Center.

Between all of the WrestleMania Weekend events (SmackDown/HOF induction ceremony, Stand & Deliver, both nights of WrestleMania XL, and Raw), WWE announced a grand total attendance of 201,924.

=== Celebrity involvement ===
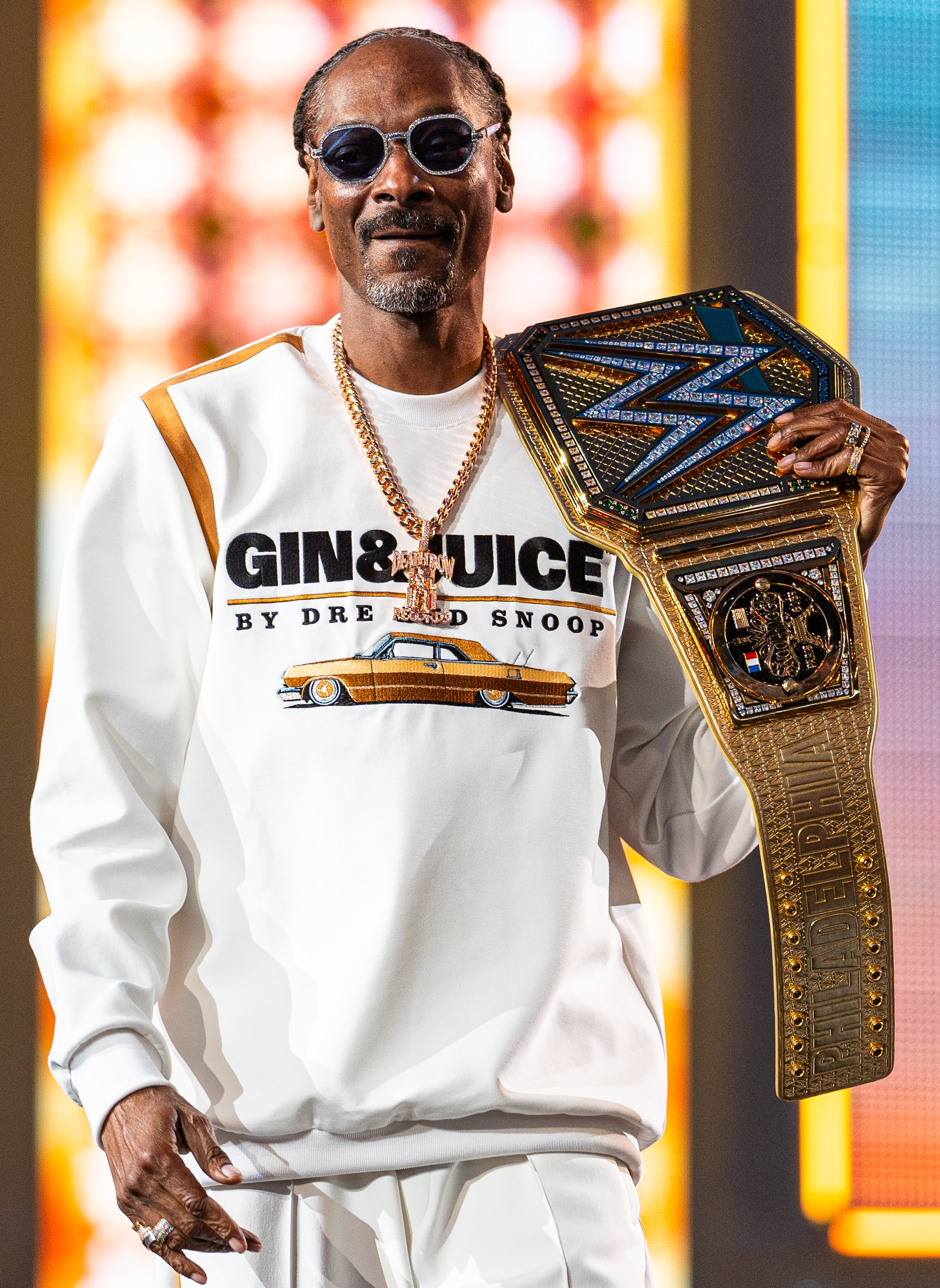
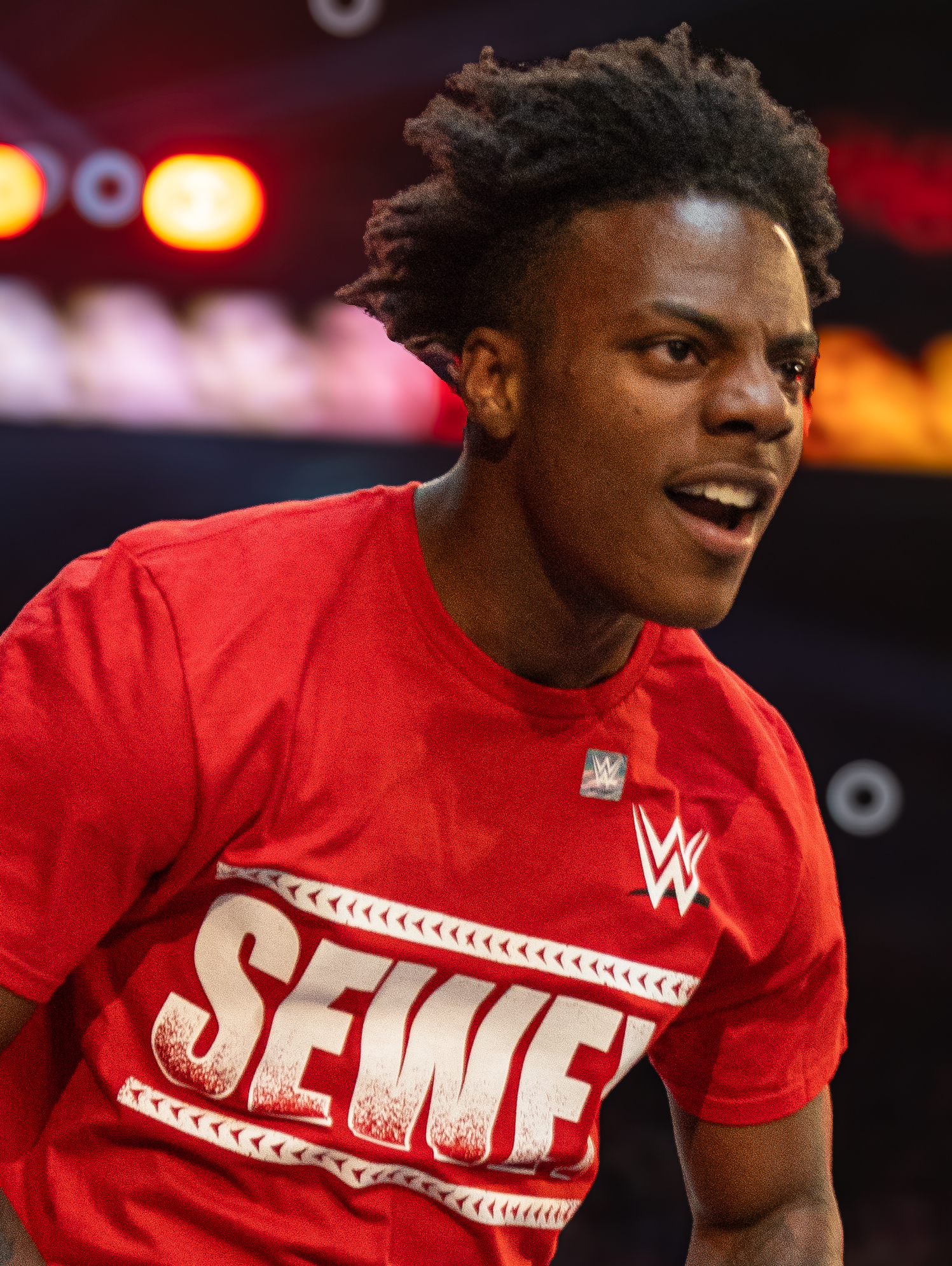
WrestleMania XL featured many celebrity guest appearances, including rapper and WWE Hall of Famer, Snoop Dogg, and online streamer IShowSpeed.

WrestleMania also features celebrity appearances from those outside of wrestling, who participated at the event in various capacities, such as rapper and Philadelphia native Meek Mill, who narrated the cold open for the event on both nights.

On Night 1, Grammy Award winning R&B singer and actress Coco Jones opened the show by performing "The Star-Spangled Banner". Grammy winning rapper Lil Wayne also debuted his latest single during the event. Philadelphia Eagles offensive linemen Jason Kelce and Lane Johnson were involved in the Rey Mysterio and Andrade vs. Santos Escobar and "Dirty" Dominik Mysterio tag team match, aiding Rey and Andrade. Metalcore band Motionless In White appeared and performed the theme song of Rhea Ripley called "Demon In Your Dreams".

On Night 2, Country music duo The War and Treaty performed "God Bless America" to open the show. WWE Hall of Famer and rapper Snoop Dogg was on commentary for the Philadelphia Street Fight, and returned later alongside the Philadelphia Eagles cheerleaders to announce the evening's attendance. Rapper and YouTuber IShowSpeed accompanied Logan Paul to the ring for his WWE United States Championship defense (wearing a Prime bottle costume at the start and then revealing himself while the match was in progress).

=== Storylines ===
The event included 14 matches, split evenly between both nights, that resulted from scripted storylines. Results were predetermined by WWE's writers on the Raw and SmackDown brands, while storylines were produced on WWE's weekly television shows, Monday Night Raw and Friday Night SmackDown.

==== Main event matches ====
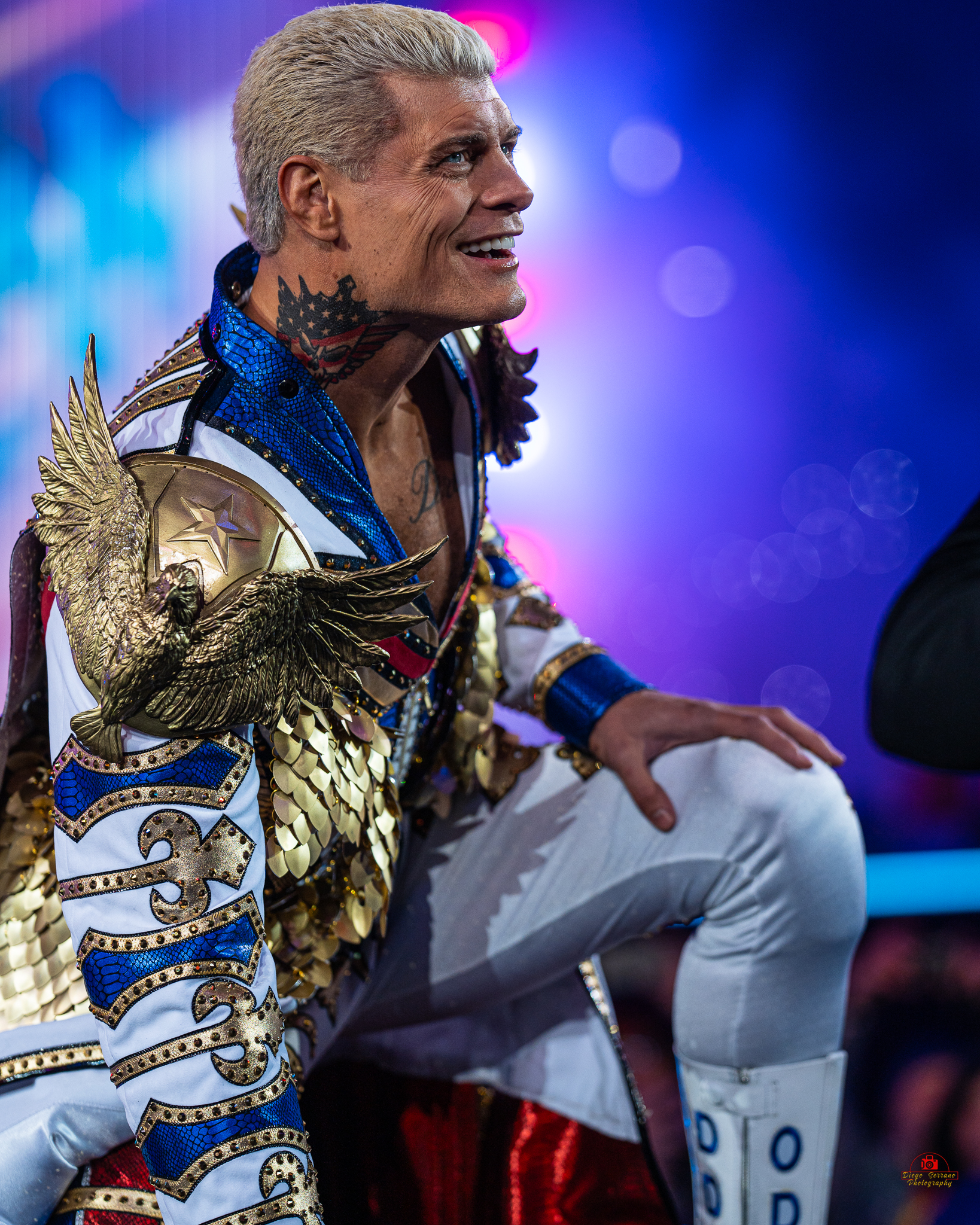
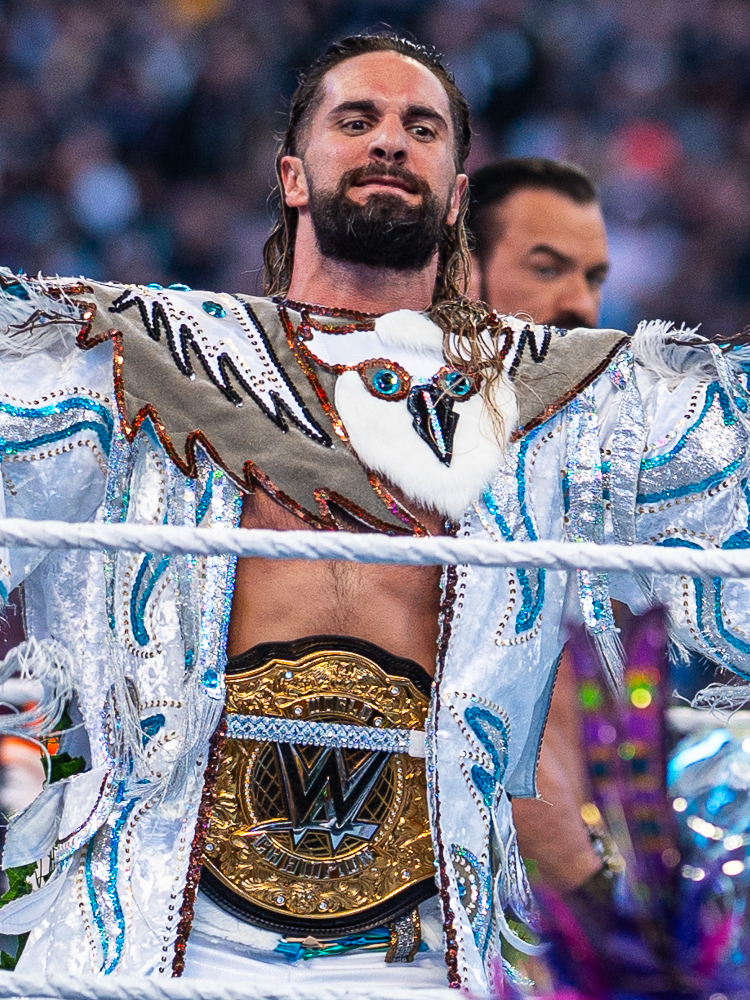
Cody Rhodes and Seth "Freakin" Rollins wrestled on both nights of WrestleMania XL. In the main event of Night 1, they teamed to face The Bloodline (The Rock and Roman Reigns) in a tag team match. On Night 2, Rhodes faced Reigns for SmackDown's Undisputed WWE Universal Championship in the main event while Rollins defended Raw's World Heavyweight Championship against Drew McIntyre in the opening bout.

After Cody Rhodes made his return to WWE at WrestleMania 38 in April 2022, he declared he would finish his story by winning the WWE Championship, a title his father Dusty Rhodes never held. Also at WrestleMania 38, Roman Reigns became the Undisputed WWE Universal Champion by retaining the WWE Universal Championship and winning the WWE Championship. Rhodes subsequently won the 2023 Royal Rumble match but failed to defeat Reigns for the undisputed title at WrestleMania 39. A year later prior to the 2024 Royal Rumble at Raw: Day 1 on January 1, The Rock made a surprise appearance and seemingly called out Reigns by asking if he should sit at the "head of the table", a reference to their relationship through the Anoaʻi family as for over three years, Reigns had claimed he was the Head of the Table and Tribal Chief of The Bloodline, a faction of wrestlers from the family that, at the time, included Reigns and his cousins Jimmy Uso and Solo Sikoa, managed by Paul Heyman.

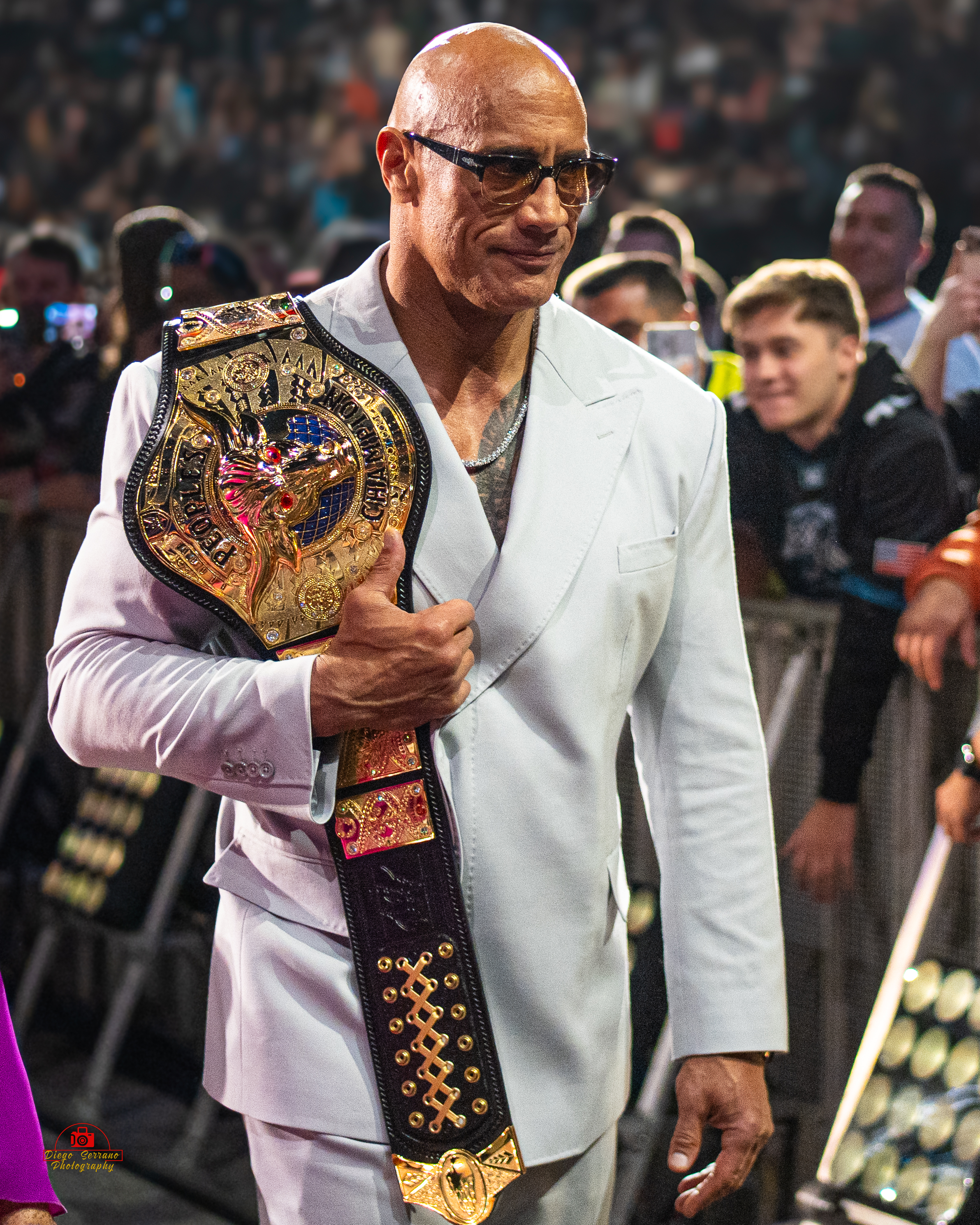
The Rock competed in his first match since WrestleMania 32 in 2016 when he teamed up with Roman Reigns to face Cody Rhodes and Seth "Freakin" Rollins in a tag team match on Night 1.

Rhodes again won the Royal Rumble match in 2024. With the introduction of the World Heavyweight Championship after WrestleMania 39, which became exclusive to Raw after the Undisputed WWE Universal Championship became exclusive to SmackDown, Rhodes received a choice of which world title to challenge for at WrestleMania XL. During the Royal Rumble post-event press conference, Rhodes stated that he wanted to face Reigns again for the Undisputed WWE Universal Championship, but on the January 29 episode of Raw, Seth "Freakin" Rollins argued that Rhodes should instead challenge him for the World Heavyweight Championship. On that week's SmackDown, Rhodes announced that he would not challenge Reigns at WrestleMania and said that one of the individuals he took counsel from in making his decision knew Reigns very well. Rock then came out and stared down Reigns, with the clear implication that he would be Reigns's WrestleMania opponent instead. This decision drew intense fan backlash with the hashtag #WeWantCody trending on social media worldwide, which caused WWE to legitimately pivot their story plans. A WrestleMania XL Kickoff media event was then held on February 8 where Reigns and Rock declared that they would face each other for the Undisputed WWE Universal Championship in the main event of WrestleMania XL, which Rock dubbed as "the biggest match in the history of professional wrestling". However, Rhodes appeared and asserted that since he won the Royal Rumble, he earned the right to decide the main event and announced that he had reversed his decision and would challenge Reigns for the title at WrestleMania. After bringing up each other's families, Rock claimed that he and Rhodes now had issues and he slapped Rhodes in the face, turning heel for the first time since 2003. In the ensuing brawl, Rollins backed Rhodes.

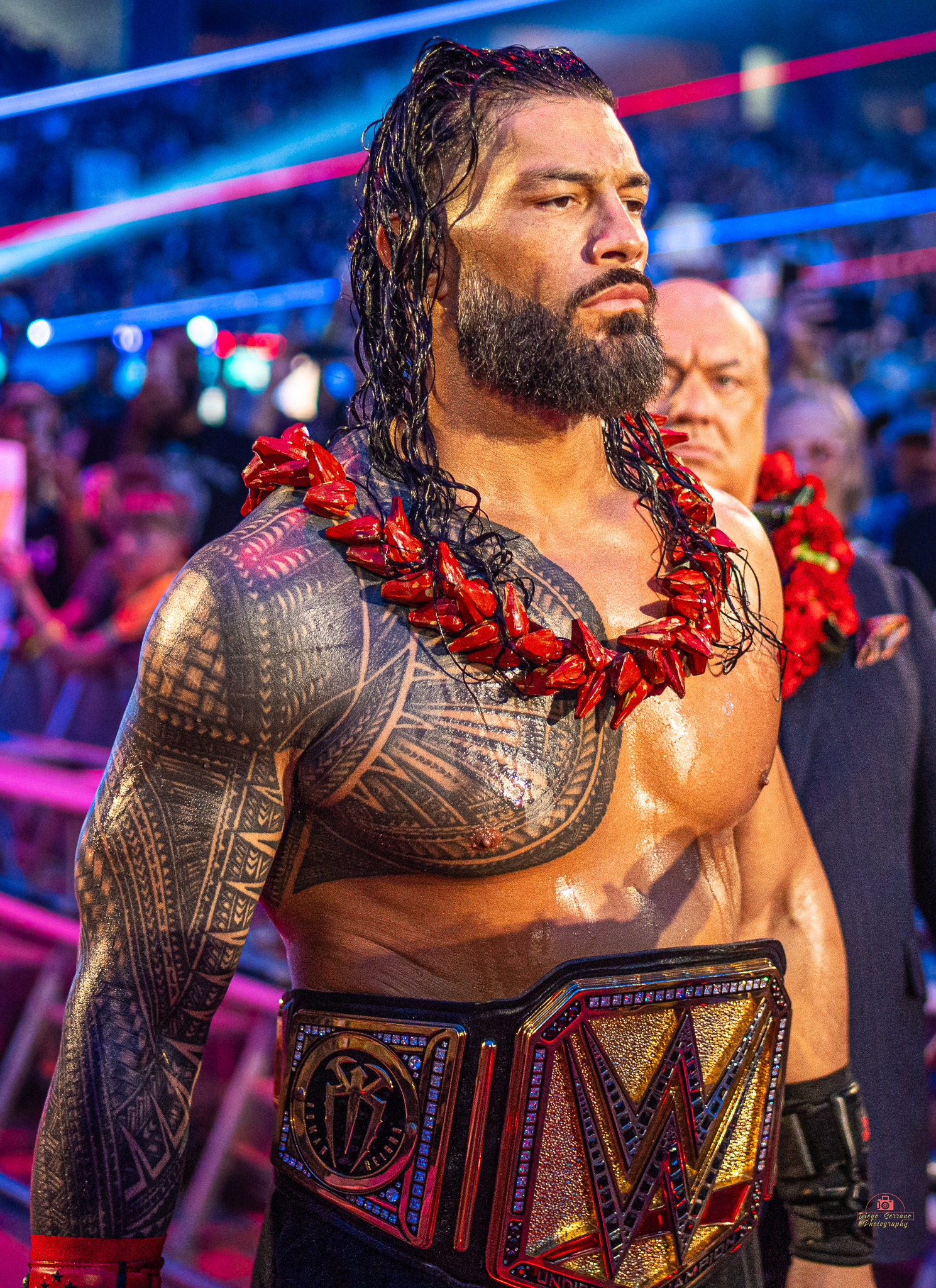
WrestleMania XL marked Roman Reigns's fourth consecutive defense of the WWE Universal Championship at WrestleMania, and his second as Undisputed WWE Universal Champion. In main eventing both nights, Reigns set the record for most WrestleMania main event matches at nine.

On the following SmackDown, WWE Chief Content Officer Paul "Triple H" Levesque affirmed that the main event of Night 2 of WrestleMania XL would be Reigns defending the Undisputed WWE Universal Championship against Rhodes. On the February 12 episode of Raw, Rhodes claimed that it was because of the fans that he reversed his decision and decided to challenge Reigns. Rollins interrupted and stated that he understood Rhodes's decision and offered to be his backup due to Reigns always having his family in his corner. In response on that week's SmackDown, Rock officially joined The Bloodline and vowed that he would do everything in his power to ensure Rhodes did not finish his story.

At Elimination Chamber on February 24, Rhodes challenged Rock to a one-on-one match at any time, and Rollins again asserted that he would be in Rhodes's corner in facing The Bloodline. On the following SmackDown, Rock rejected Rhodes's challenge and instead offered a counter: a tag team match featuring Rhodes and Rollins against Rock and Reigns in the main event of Night 1 of WrestleMania XL with an added stipulation that if Rhodes and Rollins won, then The Bloodline would be barred from ringside during the Undisputed WWE Universal Championship match on Night 2; however, if Rock and Reigns won, then the championship match would be contested under The Bloodline's rules in which anything goes. Rhodes and Rollins appeared on the next week's episode where they accepted the challenge.

==== Undercard matches ====
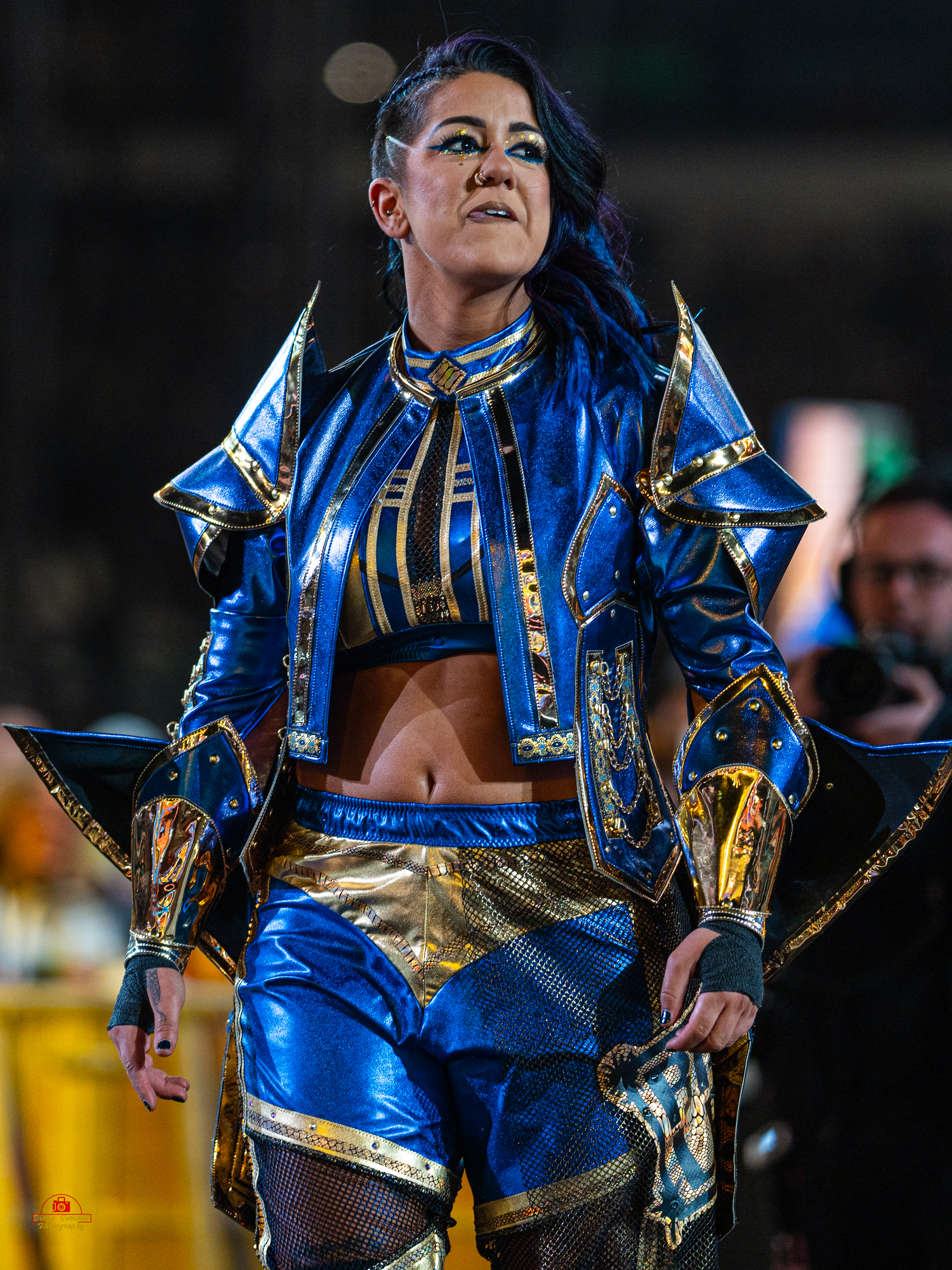
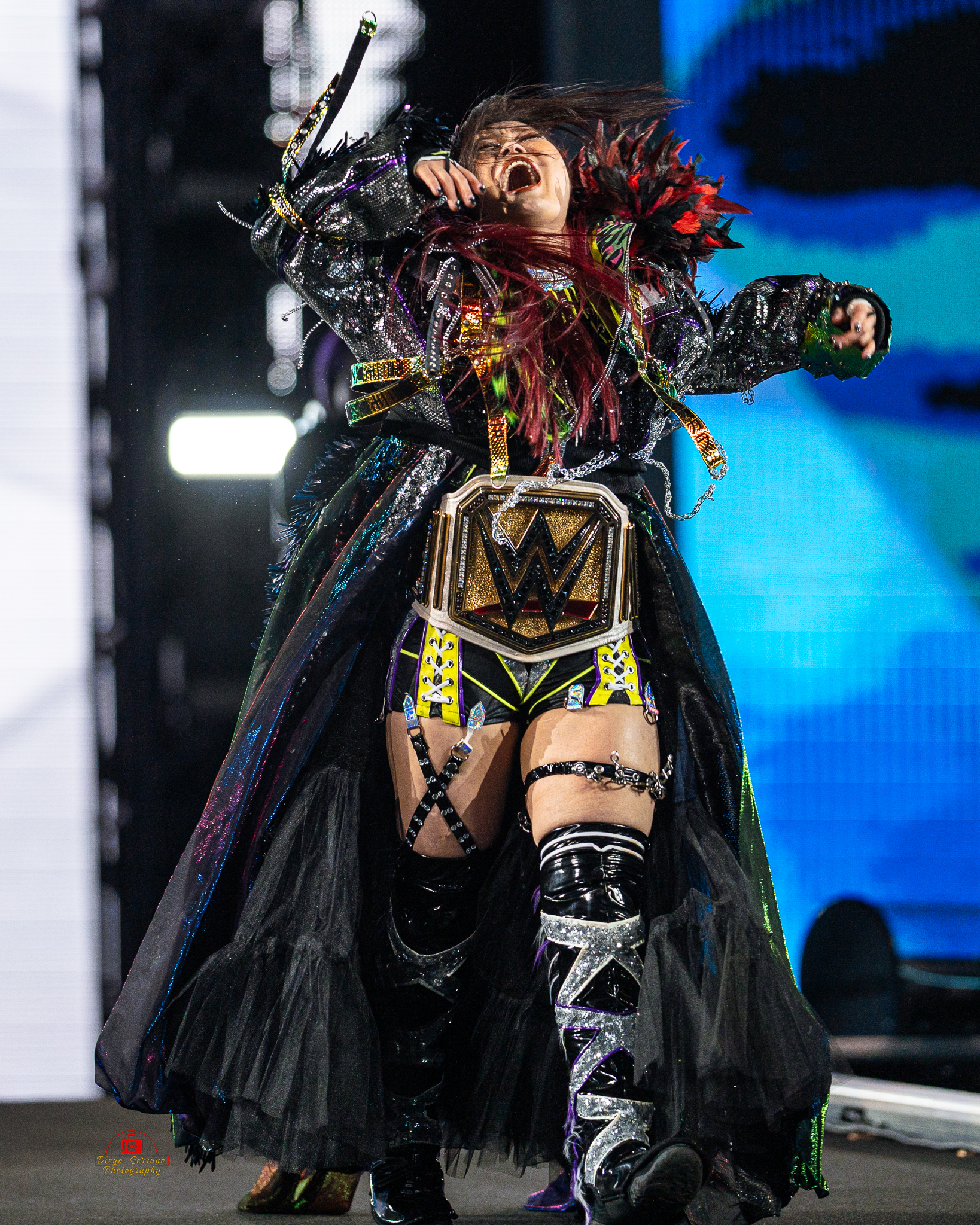
2024 Women's Royal Rumble winner Bayley challenged Iyo Sky for SmackDown's WWE Women's Championship on Night 2.

At SummerSlam in July 2022, Bayley made her return from injury alongside Dakota Kai and Iyo Sky with the trio dubbing themselves Damage CTRL. Kairi Sane, who returned to WWE in November 2023 and who had previous issues with Bayley before her departure, forgave Bayley and joined with Damage CTRL, followed by Asuka joining the group, subsequently reuniting The Kabuki Warriors in the process. The group would attain success on SmackDown, including multiple WWE Women's Tag Team Championship reigns, as well as Sky winning the WWE Women's Championship. Bayley then won the 2024 Women's Royal Rumble match, thus earning a women's championship match of her choice at WrestleMania XL. Bayley had previously said she would be going after Raw's women's championship so that Damage CTRL would hold all the women's titles of Raw and SmackDown; however, on the February 2 episode of SmackDown, after Bayley overheard Sky, Asuka, and Sane talking behind her back, Bayley revealed she understood Japanese and heard them making fun of her. Bayley was then kicked out of Damage CTRL after Asuka and Sane attacked her, turning face for the first time since 2019. After fighting off the rest of Damage CTRL, Bayley decided that she would challenge Sky for the WWE Women's Championship at WrestleMania XL. Kai was absent when Sky, Asuka, and Sane turned on Bayley and although she seemingly sided with Bayley the next week, Kai also turned on her on the March 1 episode. On April 1, the WWE Women's Championship match was confirmed for Night 2.

Concurrent to their feud with Bayley, Damage CTRL (Iyo Sky, Dakota Kai, Asuka, and Kairi Sane) were also feuding with Naomi and Bianca Belair. On the March 29 episode of SmackDown, following Belair's win over Kai, Damage CTRL engaged in a beatdown of Belair and Naomi. Jade Cargill, who was making her debut as an official roster member of the brand that night, made the save after weeks of teasing a feud with the faction. Later, it was announced that Cargill, Naomi, and Belair would face Damage CTRL (Kai, Asuka, and Sane) in a six-woman tag team match at WrestleMania XL Night 1.

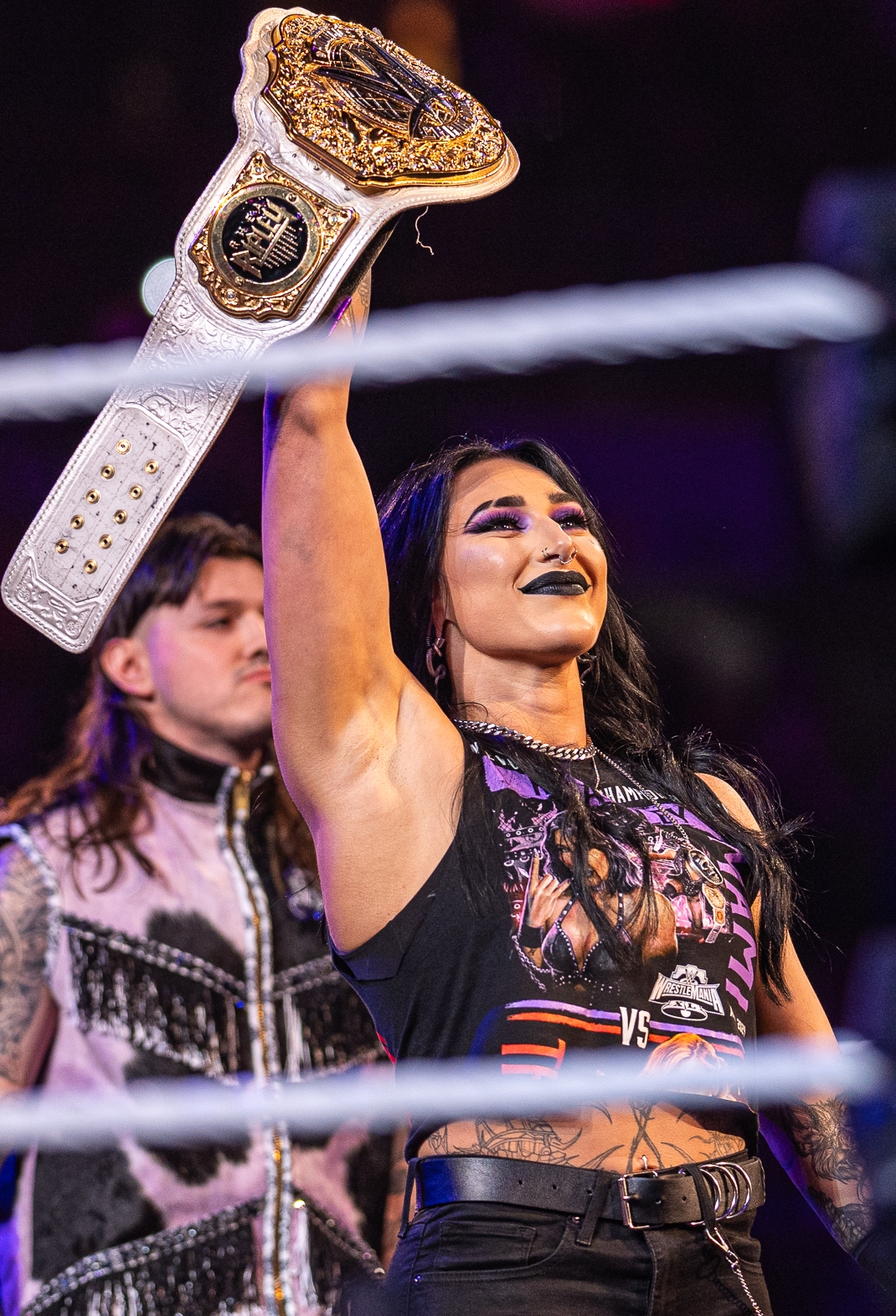
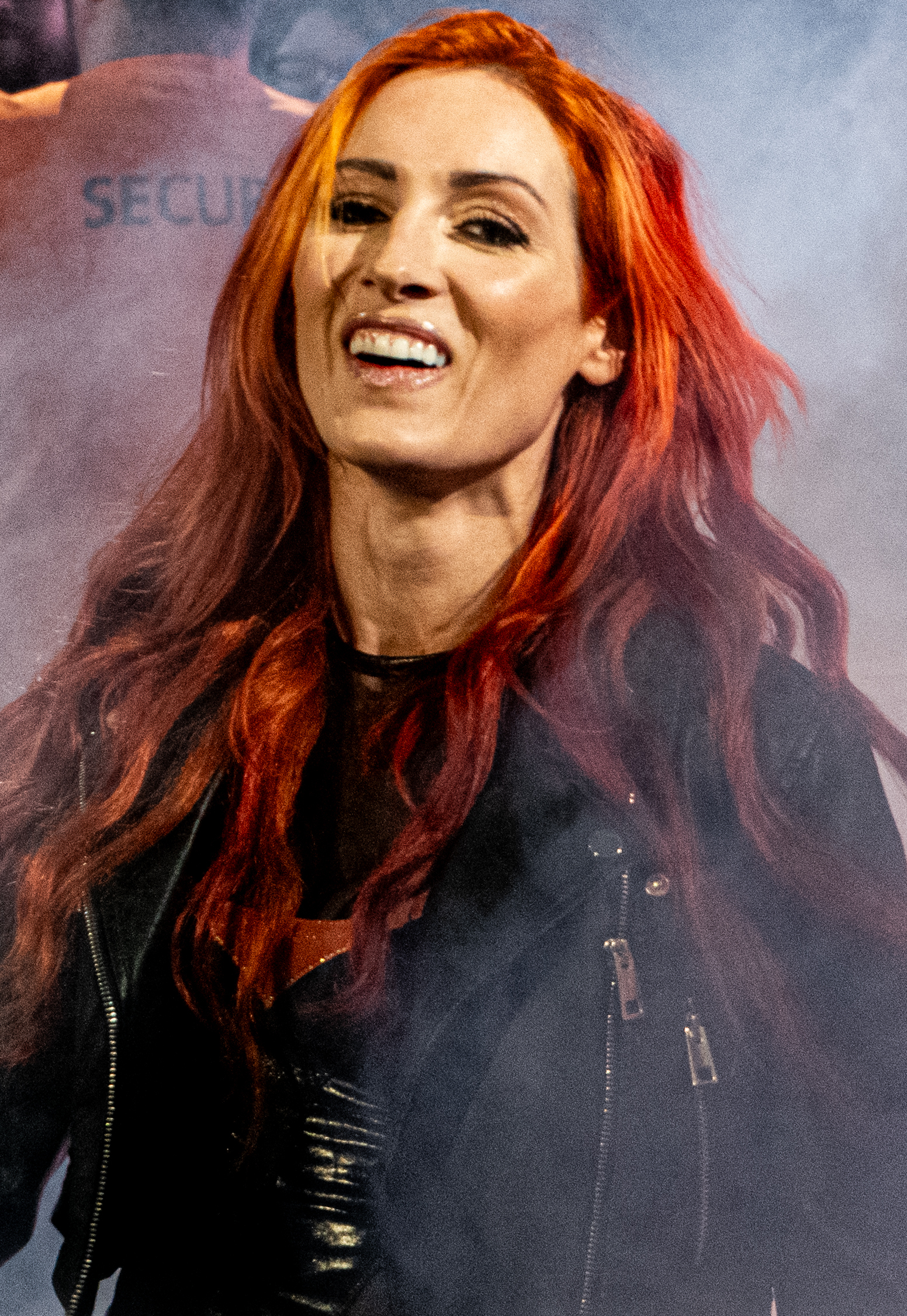
Rhea Ripley defended Raw's Women's World Championship against Becky Lynch in the opening match of Night 1.

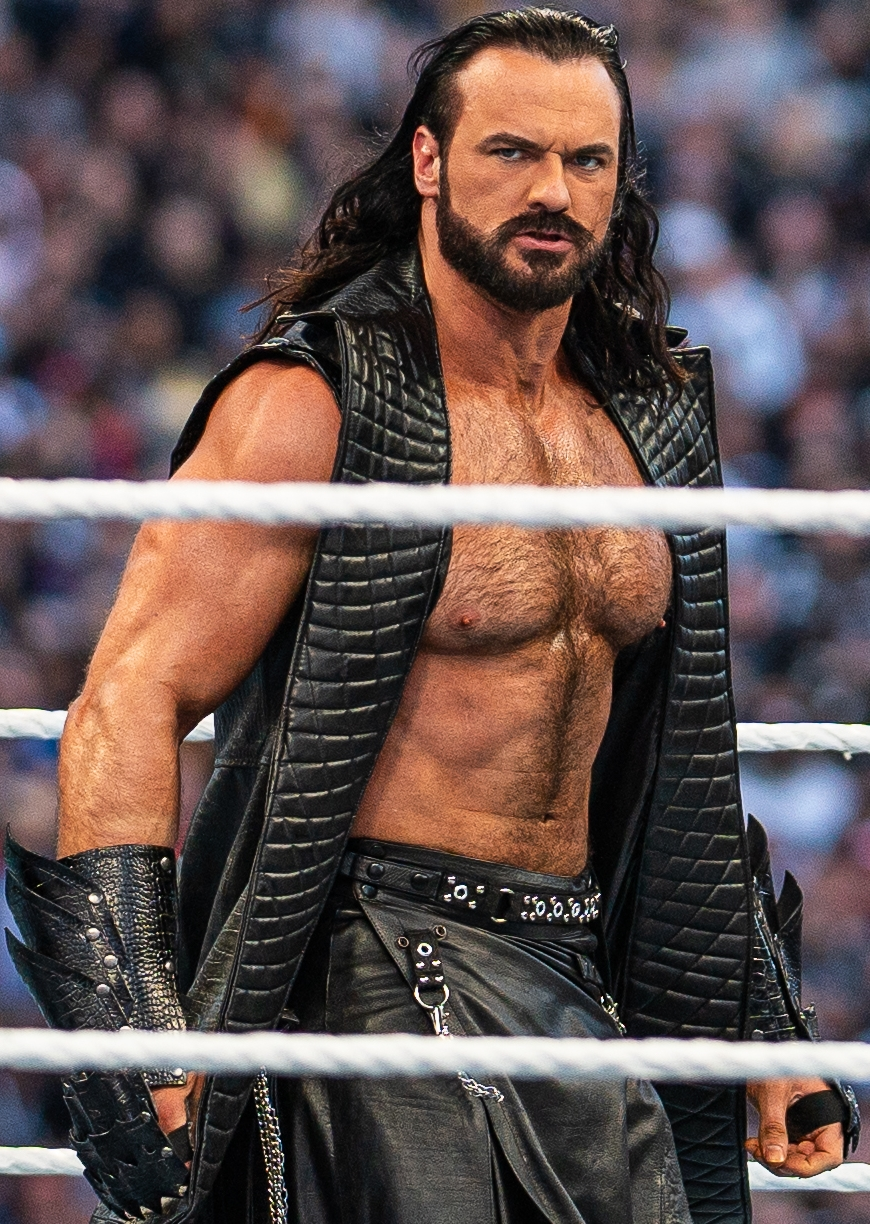
Drew McIntyre challenged Seth "Freakin" Rollins for Raw's World Heavyweight Championship in the opening match of Night 2.

As a result of both the men's and women's Royal Rumble match winners choosing to challenge for SmackDown's respective men's and women's world championships at WrestleMania XL, the challengers for Raw's respective men's and women's world championships at the event were decided by Elimination Chamber matches at Elimination Chamber. Raw's Becky Lynch won the women's eponymous match to face Rhea Ripley for the Women's World Championship, while Raw's Drew McIntyre won the men's to face Seth "Freakin" Rollins for the World Heavyweight Championship. The Women's World Championship match was scheduled for Night 1, with the World Heavyweight Championship match set for Night 2. On the March 25 episode of Raw, it was announced that CM Punk, who had issues with both Rollins and McIntyre but had gotten legitimately injured at the Royal Rumble, would serve as a special guest commentator for the World Heavyweight Championship match.

After several wrestlers declared their intentions to challenge Gunther for Raw's Intercontinental Championship at WrestleMania XL, Raw General Manager Adam Pearce announced that a gauntlet match would be held on the March 11 episode of Raw with the winner facing Gunther for the title at WrestleMania. The gauntlet match was won by Sami Zayn, and the Intercontinental Championship match was later confirmed for Night 1.

On the March 11 episode of Raw, Raw General Manager Adam Pearce and SmackDown General Manager Nick Aldis announced that at WrestleMania XL, The Judgment Day (Finn Bálor and Damian Priest) would defend the Undisputed WWE Tag Team Championship in a Six-Pack Tag Team Ladder match. Qualifying matches for the five vacant spots—three teams from Raw and two from SmackDown—occurred over the subsequent episodes of Raw and SmackDown. The three teams from Raw were determined by qualifier matches on the March 18 episode of Raw, which were won by #DIY (Johnny Gargano and Tommaso Ciampa), The Awesome Truth (The Miz and R-Truth), and The New Day (Kofi Kingston and Xavier Woods). The two teams from SmackDown were determined by two tournament brackets, which were won by A-Town Down Under (Austin Theory and Grayson Waller) and New Catch Republic (Pete Dunne and Tyler Bate) on the March 29 episode of SmackDown. On April 1, the match was confirmed for Night 1, and it was also clarified that both sets of titles under the Undisputed Championship banner (the Raw Tag Team Championship and SmackDown Tag Team Championship) had to be retrieved for the match to end.

On the December 15, 2023, episode of SmackDown, AJ Styles made a return from injury and helped LA Knight in fending off The Bloodline, but then turned on Knight and attacked him with a steel chair. Styles later explained that he attacked Knight for taking his spot in a tag team match at Fastlane in October 2023, saying he "stepped over his dead body" to get ahead. Both then participated in a fatal four-way match for the Undisputed WWE Universal Championship at the Royal Rumble in January 2024, but were unsuccessful. Knight then qualified for the men's Elimination Chamber match at Elimination Chamber the following month, but Styles did not. During the match itself, Styles snuck into the chamber and attacked Knight with a steel chair, causing Knight to be eliminated. After more weeks of feuding, Knight challenged Styles to a match at WrestleMania XL and Styles accepted, which was later confirmed for Night 2.

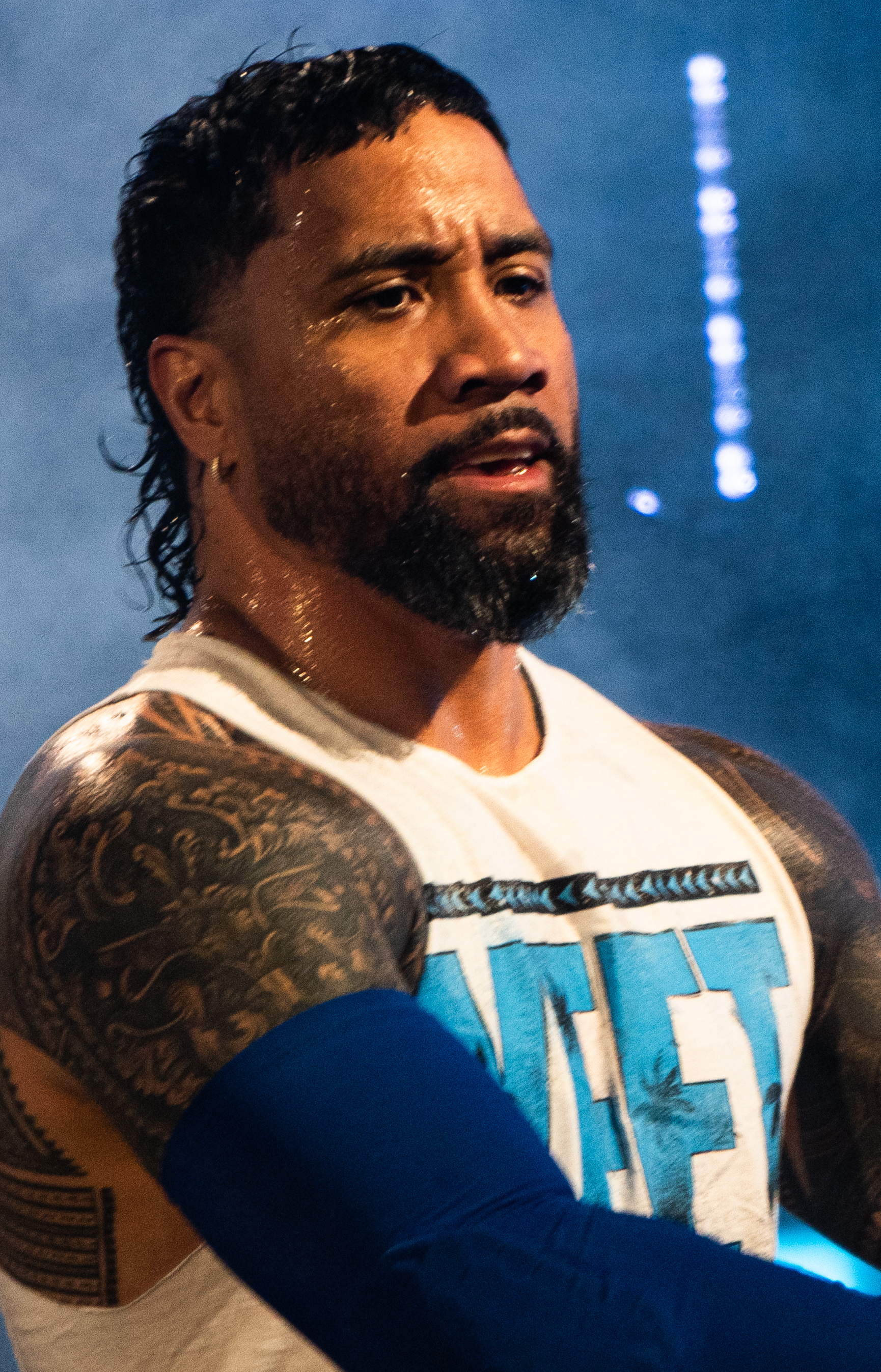
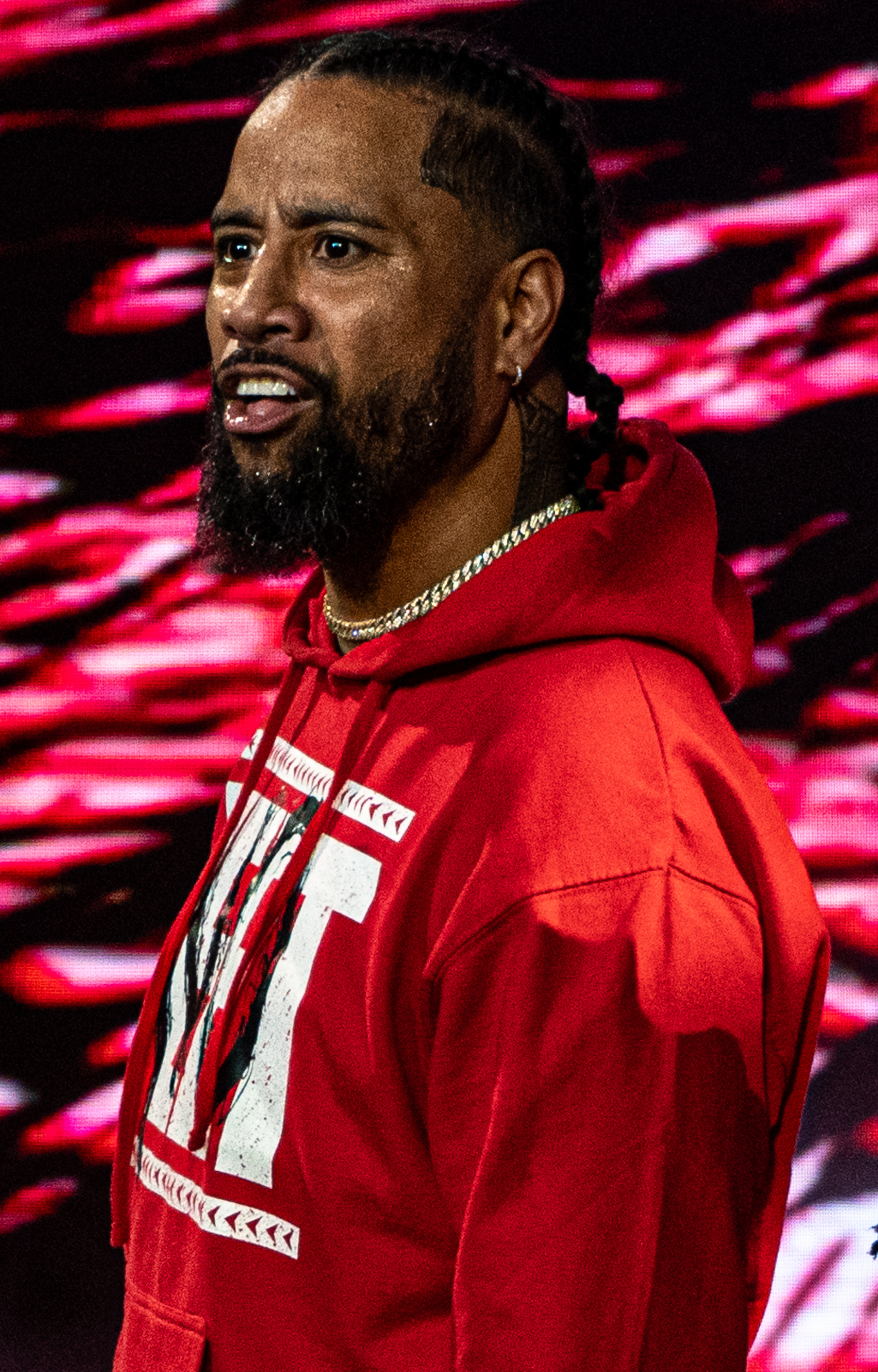
The match between Jey Uso (left) and Jimmy Uso (right) on Night 1 was only the third time two brothers fought each other at WrestleMania, following Bret Hart and Owen Hart at WrestleMania X in 1994 and Jeff Hardy and Matt Hardy at WrestleMania 25 in 2009; this particular matchup, however, was the first time two twin brothers faced each other at the event.

Prior to the summer of 2023, The Usos (Jey Uso and Jimmy Uso) were a unit of their family's stable, The Bloodline, on SmackDown. However, due to the manipulations of its leader, Roman Reigns, The Usos left the group which eventually led to a "Bloodline Civil War" tag team match at Money in the Bank against Reigns and Solo Sikoa, in which The Usos won. Jey then faced Reigns for the Undisputed WWE Universal Championship at SummerSlam that August, but Jimmy interfered and cost his brother the match. On the following SmackDown, Jimmy explained that he cost Jey the match to keep him from gaining power and becoming corrupted like Reigns. Jey subsequently attacked Jimmy and "quit" WWE, but was later reinstated as a member of the Raw roster. Despite being on different shows, Jimmy, who rejoined The Bloodline, would often appear on Raw and attack Jey or cost him matches. The two would also face off in the men's Royal Rumble match in January 2024 as the first two entrants. Jimmy then cost Jey a match for the Intercontinental Championship the following month. On the March 11 episode of Raw, fed up with his brother's actions, Jey challenged Jimmy to a match at WrestleMania XL, which Jimmy accepted on that week's SmackDown. The match was later confirmed for Night 1.

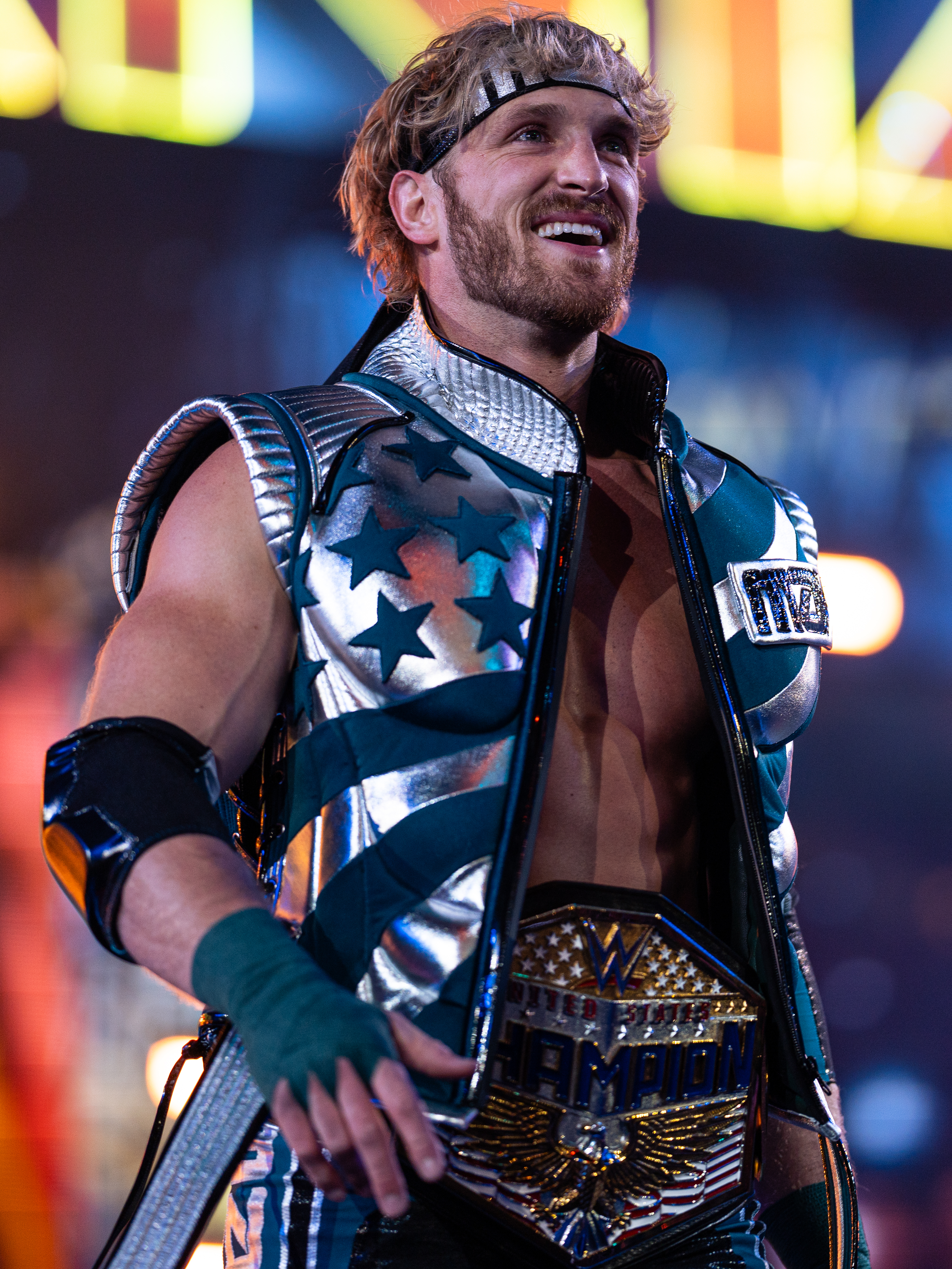
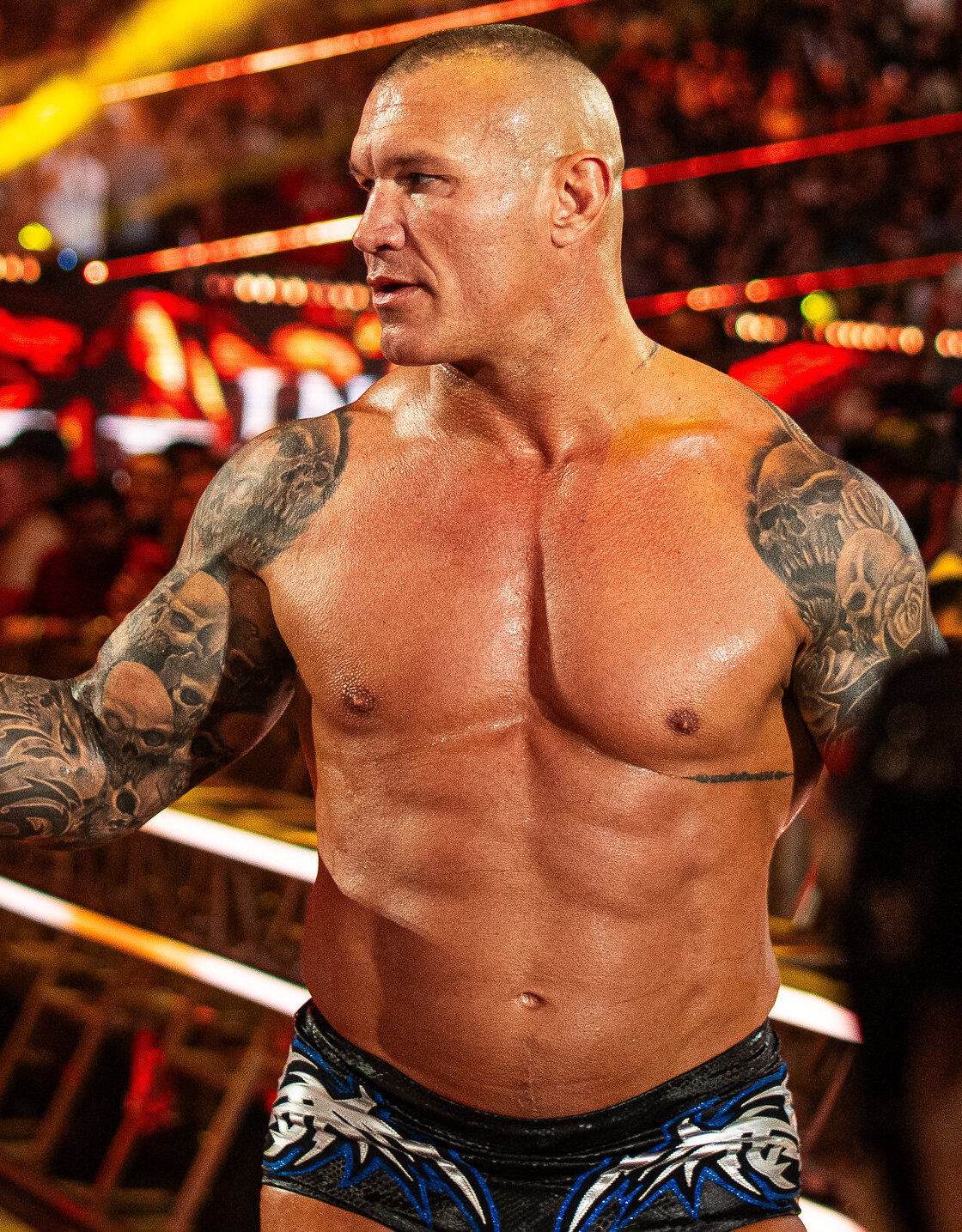
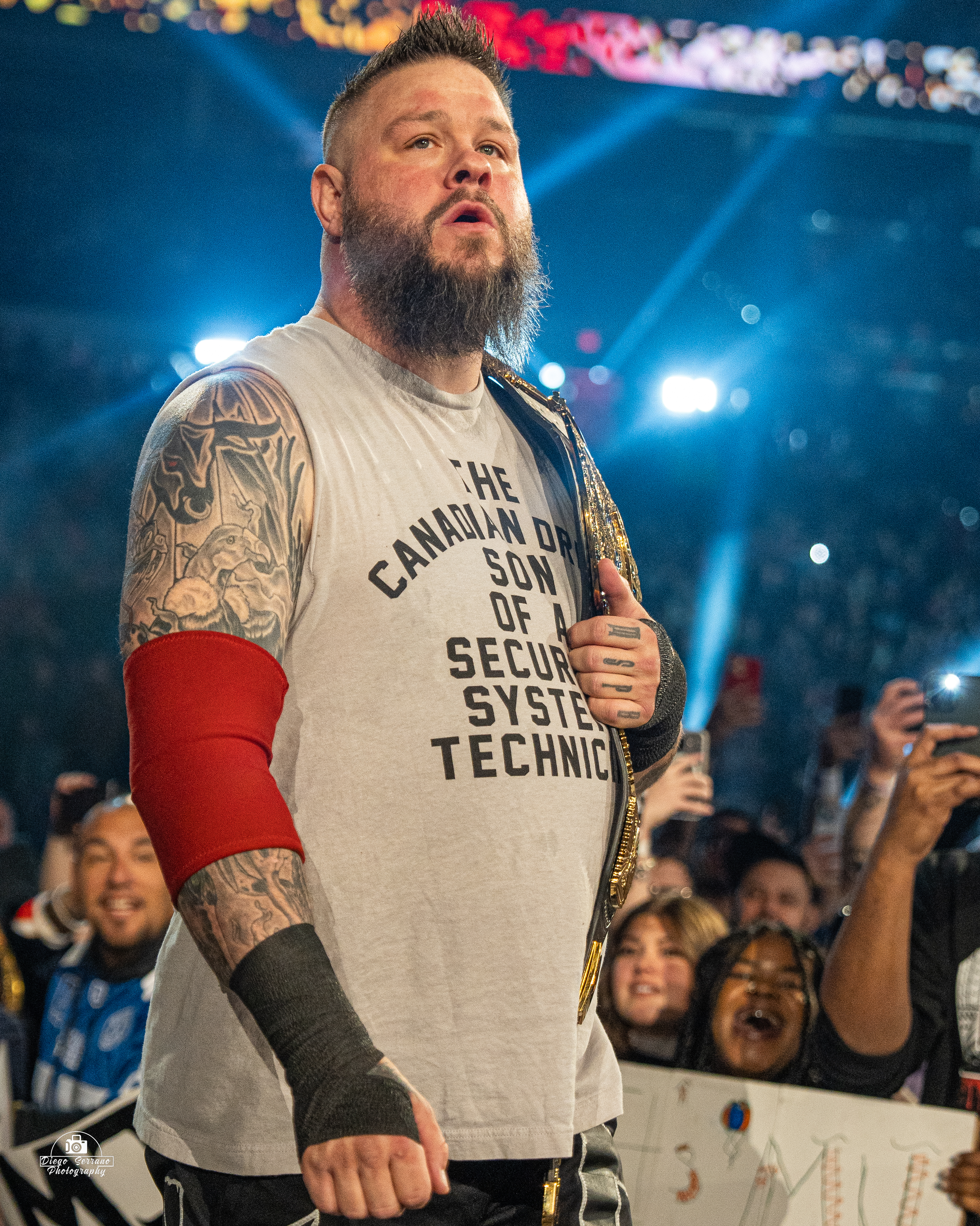
Logan Paul defended SmackDown's United States Championship against Randy Orton and Kevin Owens in a triple threat match on Night 2.

At the Royal Rumble, Logan Paul defeated Kevin Owens by disqualification to retain SmackDown's United States Championship. Paul had attempted to use his signature brass knuckles, but Owens instead used them and was caught, thus was disqualified. The following month at Elimination Chamber, Paul, Owens, and Randy Orton were participants in the men's Elimination Chamber match. Orton eliminated both Owens and Paul, who in turn caused Orton to be eliminated by punching him with the brass knuckles. On the March 8 episode of SmackDown, Paul and his business partner KSI announced that their energy drink company, Prime, would be an official WWE sponsor with the Prime logo placed in the center of the ring mat for PLEs, in turn becoming WWE's first center ring mat sponsor. Orton interrupted and attempted an RKO on Paul, but Paul escaped with KSI instead receiving the RKO. The following week, SmackDown General Manager Nick Aldis announced that Paul would defend the United States Championship against Owens and Orton in a triple threat match at WrestleMania XL, which was later confirmed for Night 2.

At Crown Jewel in November 2023, Rey Mysterio lost the United States Championship to Logan Paul after his Latino World Order (LWO) stablemate, Santos Escobar, left Paul's signature brass knuckles on the ring apron, allowing Paul to hit Rey with them and win the title. On the following episode of SmackDown, fellow LWO member Carlito accused Escobar of intentionally leaving the brass knuckles on the ring apron. Later that night, Escobar attacked Rey as he was checking on Carlito, injuring Rey's left knee and striking it with steel steps, turning heel and defecting from the LWO. After a three-month hiatus, Rey returned on the March 1 episode of SmackDown to help Carlito defeat Escobar in a street fight. Three weeks later, Escobar defeated Rey after interference from the latter's son, "Dirty" Dominik Mysterio, who had turned on his father at Clash at the Castle in September 2022 to join The Judgment Day. One week later, Escobar and his Legado Del Fantasma stablemates thanked Dominik for his actions. Rey interrupted, introduced Dragon Lee as the newest member of the LWO, and Rey and Lee subsequently challenged Escobar and Dominik to a tag team match at WrestleMania XL, which was made official for Night 1. The following week, however, Lee was attacked backstage, rendering him unable to compete at WrestleMania. Andrade, who assisted Rey in fending off Escobar and Dominik earlier that night and reunited with LWO's Zelina Vega, was named Lee's replacement.

At SmackDown: New Year's Revolution on January 5, Karrion Kross, accompanied by Scarlett, attacked The Pride (Bobby Lashley, Angelo Dawkins, and Montez Ford) with help from the returning Authors of Pain (Akam and Rezar), accompanied by Paul Ellering, with Kross, Scarlett, Authors of Pain, and Ellering forming a faction called The Final Testament. The two groups would continue feuding over the next couple of months and on the March 29 episode of SmackDown, The Final Testament attacked Lashley and B-Fab backstage, causing a distraction that cost The Street Profits (Dawkins and Ford) their tournament final match to qualify for the Undisputed WWE Tag Team Championship match at WrestleMania XL. On April 1, a six-man tag team Philadelphia Street Fight pitting The Final Testament against The Pride was confirmed for WrestleMania XL Night 2.

==== Cancelled matches ====
Brock Lesnar, who last appeared at SummerSlam in August 2023, was planned to return at the Royal Rumble and be featured in a match at WrestleMania XL, reportedly against Gunther for the Intercontinental Championship. However, due to Lesnar being referenced in a sex trafficking lawsuit against WWE chairman Vince McMahon, Lesnar was pulled from the Royal Rumble and all planned storylines for him leading into WrestleMania were scrapped.

CM Punk, who after nearly 10 years made his return to WWE at Survivor Series: WarGames in November 2023, legitimately tore his right triceps during the men's Royal Rumble match. It was reported that his planned WrestleMania XL match was to challenge Seth "Freakin" Rollins for Raw's World Heavyweight Championship, but due to his injury, plans were changed.

== Event ==
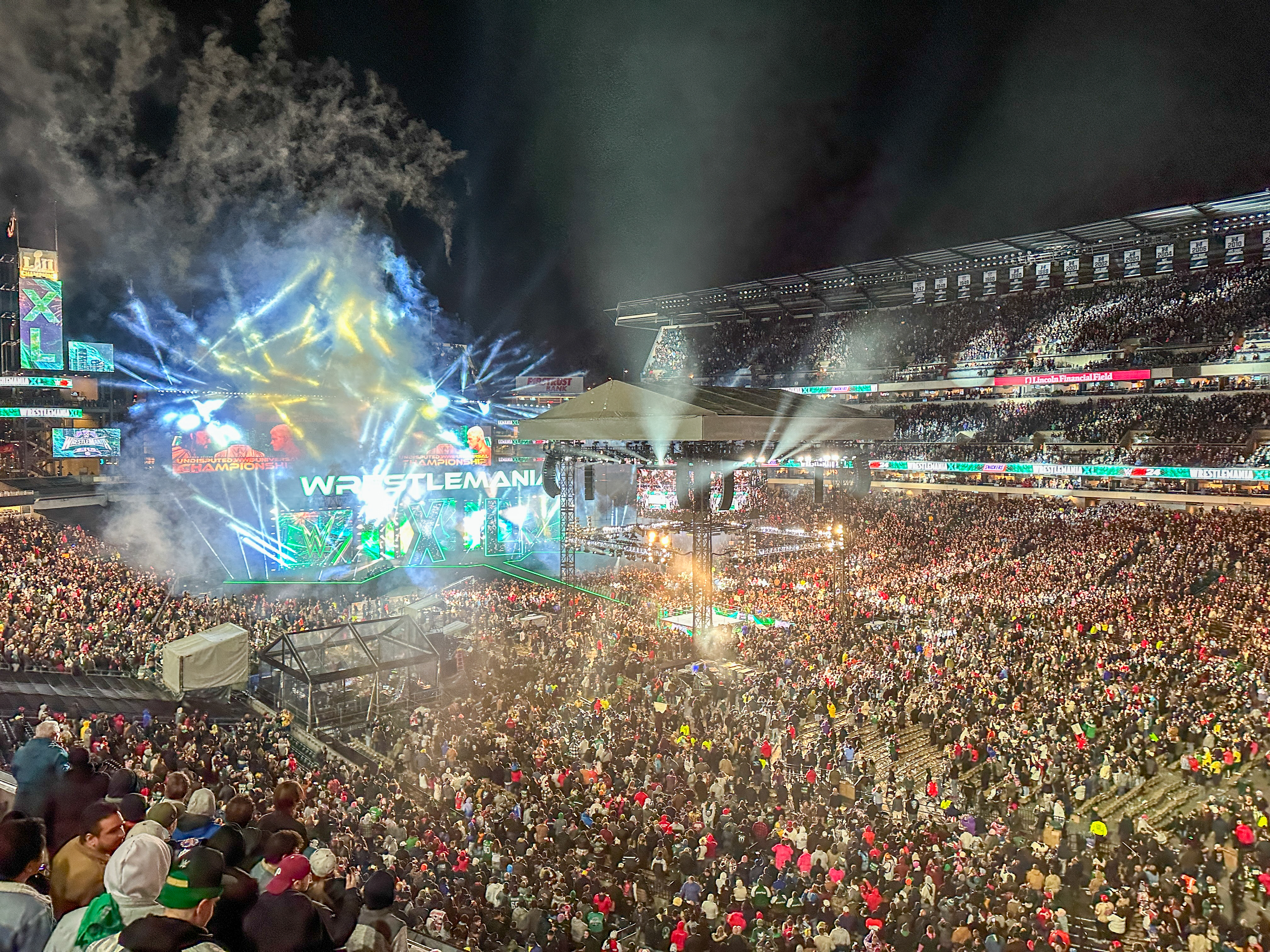
Lincoln Financial Field during WrestleMania XL

=== Night 1 ===
Other on-screen personnel – Saturday
Role	Name
English commentators	Michael Cole
English commentators	Corey Graves
English commentators	Pat McAfee
Spanish commentators	Marcelo Rodriguez
Spanish commentators	Jerry Soto
Ring announcer	Samantha Irvin
Referees	Danilo Anfibio
Referees	Jason Ayers
Referees	Shawn Bennett
Referees	Jessika Carr
Referees	Daphanie LaShaunn
Referees	Eddie Orengo
Referees	Chad Patton
Referees	Rod Zapata
Interviewers	Kayla Braxton
Interviewers	Cathy Kelley
Interviewers	Byron Saxton
Pre-show panel	Jackie Redmond
Pre-show panel	CM Punk
Pre-show panel	Big E
Pre-show panel	Wade Barrett
Pre-show correspondents	Megan Morant
Pre-show correspondents	Tom Rinaldi

==== Preliminary matches ====
WrestleMania Saturday began with WWE Chief Content Officer Triple H welcoming and hyping up the fans for the event.

In the first match, Rhea Ripley defended the Women World's Championship against Becky Lynch. During the match, Lynch performed a leg drop on Ripley, sending her out of the ring and a Beck-sploder on Ripley at ringside. Lynch applied the Dis-arm-her on Ripley, who escaped by performing three sit-out powerbombs on Lynch for a nearfall. Lynch attempted another leg drop on Ripley, who countered into a Prison Trap submission maneuver, however, Lynch escaped. As Ripley attempted the Riptide, Lynch countered into a Manhandle Slam on Ripley for a nearfall. Ripley performed a Riptide on Lynch for a nearfall. Lynch applied the Dis-Arm-Her on Ripley, which sent both of the ring and Ripley a powerbomb on Lynch to escape. Ripley performed a frog splash on Lynch for a near fall. In the closing moments, as Lynch attempted a second Manhandle Slam, Ripley countered and performed two Riptides on Lynch to retain the title.

Next, The Judgment Day (Finn Bálor and Damian Priest) defended the Undisputed WWE Tag Team Championship in a Six-Pack Tag Team Ladder match against #DIY (Johnny Gargano and Tommaso Ciampa), The New Day (Kofi Kingston and Xavier Woods), The Awesome Truth (The Miz and R-Truth), A-Town Down Under (Austin Theory and Grayson Waller), and New Catch Republic (Pete Dunne and Tyler Bate) in which both sets of titles had to be retrieved for the match to end. During the match, Truth performed the Attitude Adjustment on Bálor and pinned him for a three count. Truth celebrated, thinking it was a traditional tag team match, however, Miz had informed Truth that they had to unhook the title belts down to win them. Truth then suggested that #DIY go after the Raw Tag Team Championship, while he and Miz go after the SmackDown Tag Team Championship. The two teams were then knocked down by A-Town Down Under, who climbed the ladder and retrieved the SmackDown titles to become the new SmackDown Tag Team Champions. New Catch Republic then sent Waller crashing through ladders outside the ring. #DIY then set two tables next to each other at ringside. Judgment Day member JD McDonagh ascended the ladder to unhook the belts, however, The New Day tipped over the ladder, causing McDonagh to crash through the tables. In the end, Truth performed another Attitude Adjustment on Priest over the top rope to the floor. Truth then ascended the ladder and unhooked the Raw titles to win them, concluding the match as well as ending the Undisputed WWE Tag Team Championship with the two titles now separated. This made Truth the oldest Raw Tag Team Champion in the title's history and marked his first win at WrestleMania.

After that, Rey Mysterio and Andrade (accompanied by Rey's LWO stablemates Carlito, Cruz Del Toro, Joaquin Wilde, and Zelina Vega) faced Santos Escobar and "Dirty" Dominik Mysterio (accompanied by Escobar's Legado del Fantasma stablemates Angel, Berto, and Elektra Lopez). In the end, two masked men incapacitated Dominik, and Rey then performed a 619 on Dominik and Escobar. Andrade performed The Message on Dominik and Rey performed a diving splash on Escobar to win the match. Following the match, the masked men, who were revealed as Philadelphia Eagles offensive linemen Jason Kelce and Lane Johnson, celebrated with the LWO.

In the fourth match, Jey Uso faced his brother Jimmy Uso in only the third-ever real life brother vs. brother match at WrestleMania (after Bret Hart vs. Owen Hart at WrestleMania X in March 1994 and Jeff Hardy vs. Matt Hardy at WrestleMania 25 in April 2009). Before the match officially began, the two brawled at ringside. During the match, Jey and Jimmy traded multiple superkicks against each other. As Jey attempted a superkick on Jimmy, Jimmy pleaded forgiveness to Jey with Jimmy feigning an apology. After Jimmy offered a handshake to Jey, the latter shook his brother's hand and embraced him, however, Jimmy responded with a super kick to Jey. Jimmy then performed the Frog Splash on Jey for a nearfall. In the end, Jey performed a Spear and Uso Splash on Jimmy to win the match.

Next, Jade Cargill, Bianca Belair, and Naomi faced off against Damage CTRL (Dakota Kai, Asuka, and Kairi Sane) in a six-woman tag team match. In the end, Asuka accidentally spit mist in Sane's face, allowing Belair to whip Asuka with her ponytail and followed up with the KOD. Cargill then performed the Jaded on Kai to win the match.

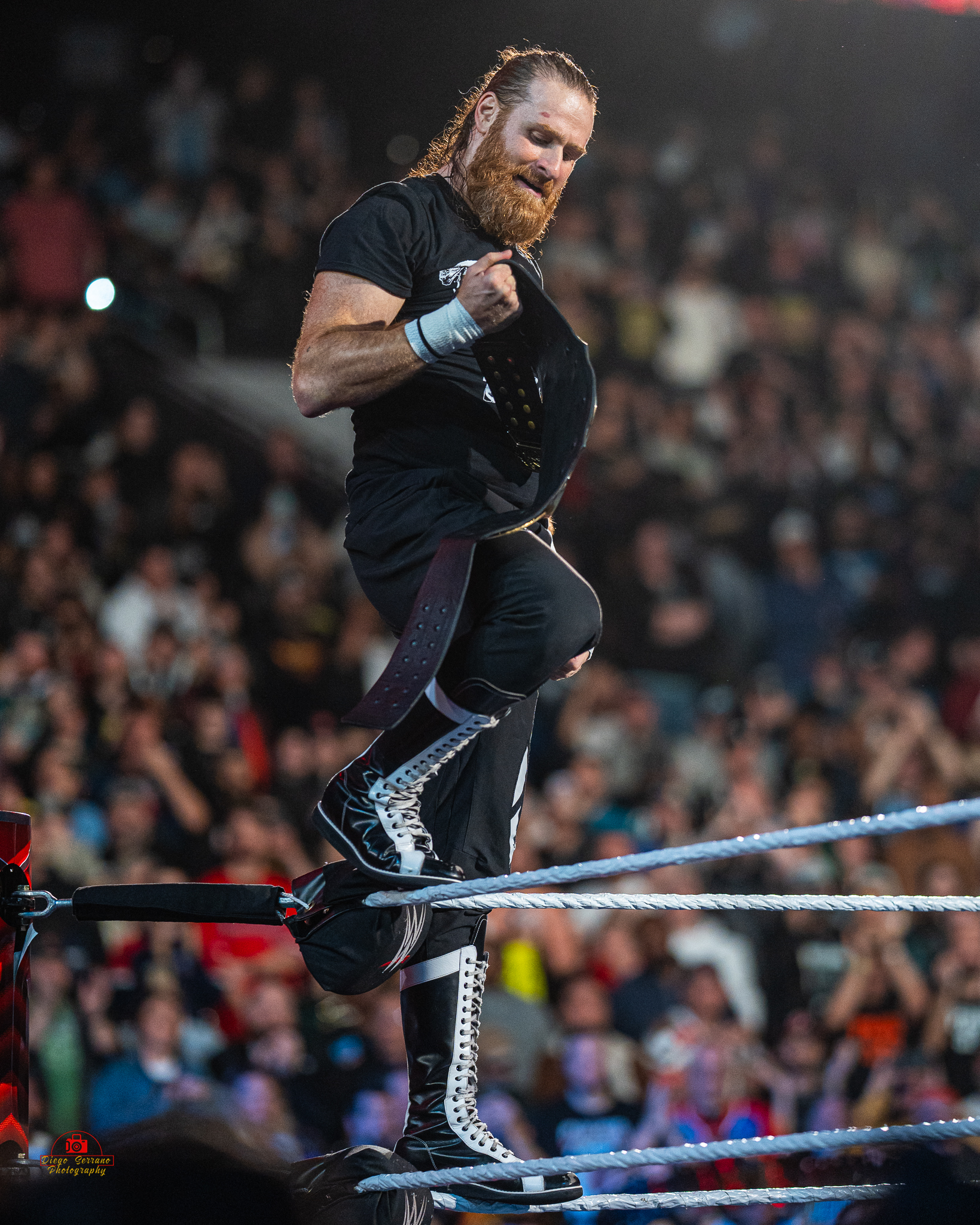
Sami Zayn ended Gunther's Intercontinental Championship reign at 666 days, the longest in the title's history.

In the penultimate match, Gunther defended the Intercontinental Championship against Sami Zayn. As Zayn charged for the Helluva Kick, Gunther countered into a sleeper hold submission. Zayn escaped and attempted the Blue Thunder Bomb, but Gunther countered again and applied another sleeper hold. Gunther performed a dropkick and powerbomb on Zayn for a nearfall. Gunther executed multiple powerbombs, but Zayn kicked out. Gunther started mocking Zayn's wife, who was seated in the front row and performed multiple top rope splashes on Zayn. As Gunther climbed the top rope, Zayn performed a Helluva Kick and Brainbuster on Gunther on the top turnbuckle. Zayn then followed up with two consecutive Helluva Kicks and pinned Gunther to win the title for a fourth time, ending Gunther's 666 day reign as champion.

==== Main event ====
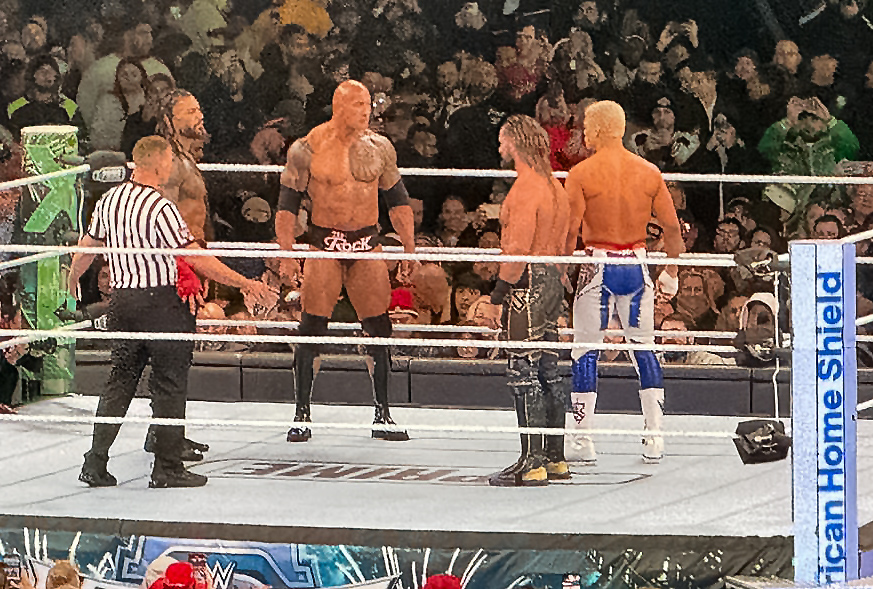
The Bloodline (Roman Reigns and The Rock) faced Seth "Freakin" Rollins and Cody Rhodes.

In the main event of Night 1, The Bloodline (The Rock and Roman Reigns, accompanied by Paul Heyman) faced Cody Rhodes and Seth "Freakin" Rollins in a match where if Rhodes and Rollins won, all members of The Bloodline would be barred from ringside during the Undisputed WWE Universal Championship match between Reigns and Rhodes on Night 2, but if Rock and Reigns won, then the championship match would be held under Bloodline Rules. While Rock and Rollins were fighting outside the ring, Rock warned referee Chad Patton that he would fire him if there was a countout. As Reigns tagged in Rock, Rock performed a low blow on Rollins. Patton apologized to Rhodes as there was nothing he could do about it. Rock applied the Sharpshooter on Rollins, which Rhodes broke up by slapping Rock in the face. As Reigns's nose was bleeding, he attempted the Spear on Rhodes, who countered and performed a Sunset Flip for a nearfall. Rhodes performed the Cody Cutter and Rollins followed up with a frog splash on Reigns for a nearfall. Rollins performed a second Stomp on Reigns, which Rhodes followed up with the Cross Rhodes. Rhodes went for the pin, but Rock pulled the referee out of the ring. Reigns recovered and hit Rhodes from behind with a low blow and a Spear. Rock rolled the referee back inside the ring for a nearfall. Outside the ring, Rock grabbed the weight belt with Rhodes's blood on it and taunted Rhodes's mother, who was seated at ringside. Back in the ring, Rock attempted the People's Elbow, but Rhodes countered with the Cody Cutter. Reigns attempted the Spear on Rhodes, who was pushed out of the way by Rollins, causing Reigns to accidentally spear Rock. Rhodes and Rollins performed simultaneous Pedigrees on Rock and Reigns for a nearfall. Outside the ring, Rhodes performed the Rock Bottom on Rock through the broadcast table, while Reigns speared Rollins through the barricade. Back in the ring, as Rhodes attempted a third consecutive Cross Rhodes on Reigns, Rock whipped Rhodes with the weight belt, allowing Reigns to perform the Spear on Rhodes. Reigns tagged in Rock, who performed the Rock Bottom and the People's Elbow on Rhodes and pinned him to win the match, making the Undisputed WWE Universal Championship match on Night 2 to be held under Bloodline Rules. This match was the second longest in WrestleMania history (after Bret Hart vs. Shawn Michaels at WrestleMania XII in 1996). The Rock and Roman Reigns became the seventh heel to win in the main event of WrestleMania as a result, including fourth in a row for Reigns.

=== Night 2 ===
Other on-screen personnel – Sunday
Role	Name
English commentators	Michael Cole
English commentators	Corey Graves
English commentators	Pat McAfee
English commentators	CM Punk (World Heavyweight Championship match)
English commentators	Snoop Dogg (Philadelphia Street Fight)
Spanish commentators	Marcelo Rodriguez
Spanish commentators	Jerry Soto
Ring announcer	Samantha Irvin
Referees	Danilo Anfibio
Referees	Bubba Ray Dudley (Philadelphia Street Fight)
Referees	Dan Engler
Referees	Eddie Orengo
Referees	Charles Robinson
Referees	Ryan Tran
Referees	Rod Zapata
Interviewers	Kayla Braxton
Interviewers	Cathy Kelley
Interviewers	Peter Rosenberg
Interviewers	Byron Saxton
Pre-show panel	Jackie Redmond
Pre-show panel	Big E
Pre-show panel	Wade Barrett
Pre-show panel	John "Bradshaw" Layfield
Pre-show correspondents	Megan Morant
Pre-show correspondents	Tom Rinaldi

==== Preliminary matches ====
WrestleMania Sunday began with a returning Stephanie McMahon hyping up the crowd for the event.

In the first match, Seth "Freakin" Rollins defended the World Heavyweight Championship against Drew McIntyre, with CM Punk as a special guest commentator. Immediately at the beginning of the match, McIntyre performed the Claymore Kick on Rollins for a nearfall. Outside the ring, McIntyre grabbed his cellphone and took a selfie with his wife, then took to social media platform X (formerly Twitter) and posted "Bored at work. LOL!". Following this, Rollins performed the Pedigree on McIntyre. The latter beat the count, but as he went back into the ring, Rollins immediately performed the Stomp for a nearfall. McIntyre turned his attention to Punk and mocked him by signaling for his finisher, the GTS, but Rollins countered into an inside cradle for a nearfall. McIntyre then performed another Claymore Kick on Rollins for a nearfall. In the climax, as Rollins kicked out of another Claymore Kick, McIntyre hit him with the maneuver again and pinned him to finally win a WWE world title in front of a live crowd.

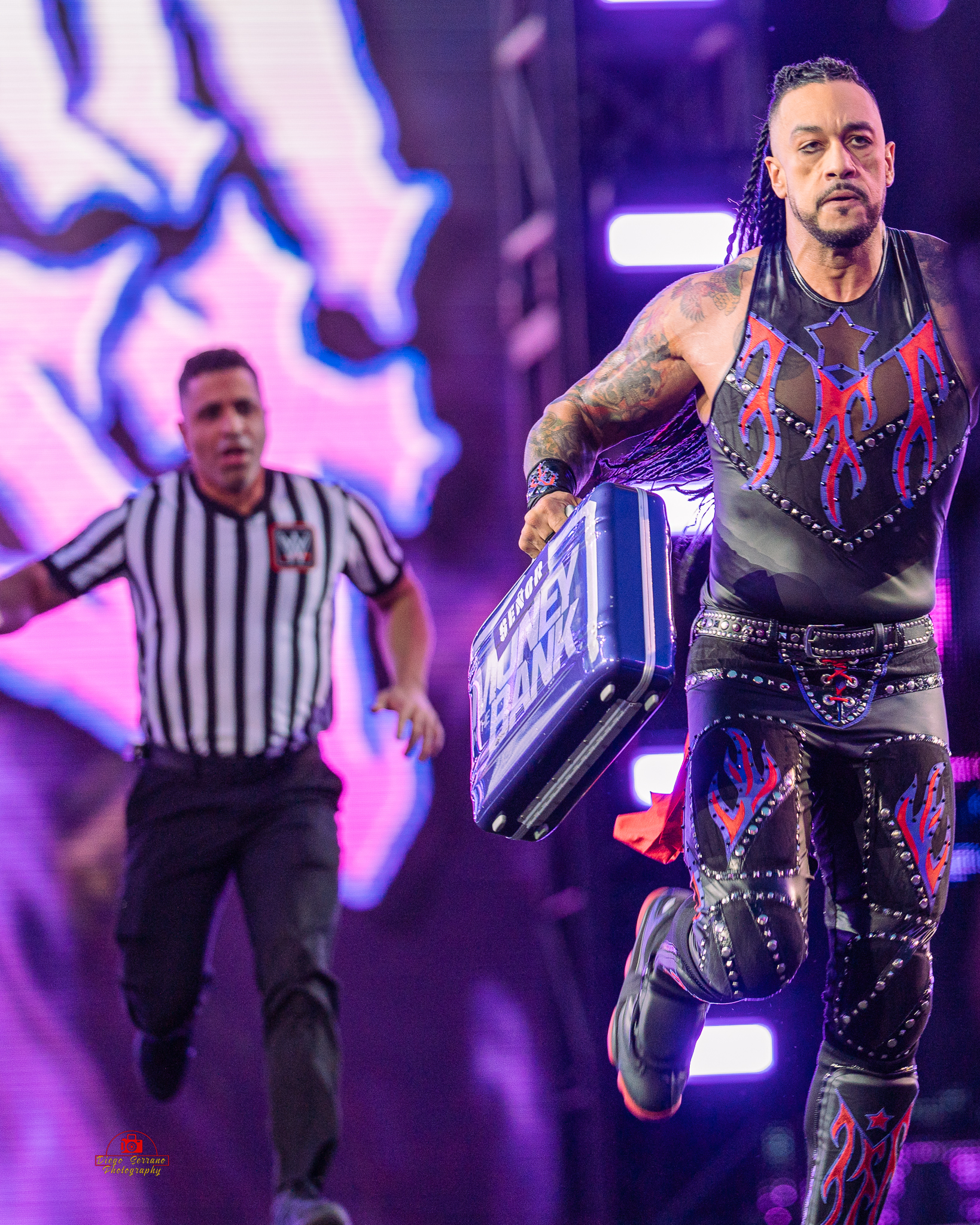
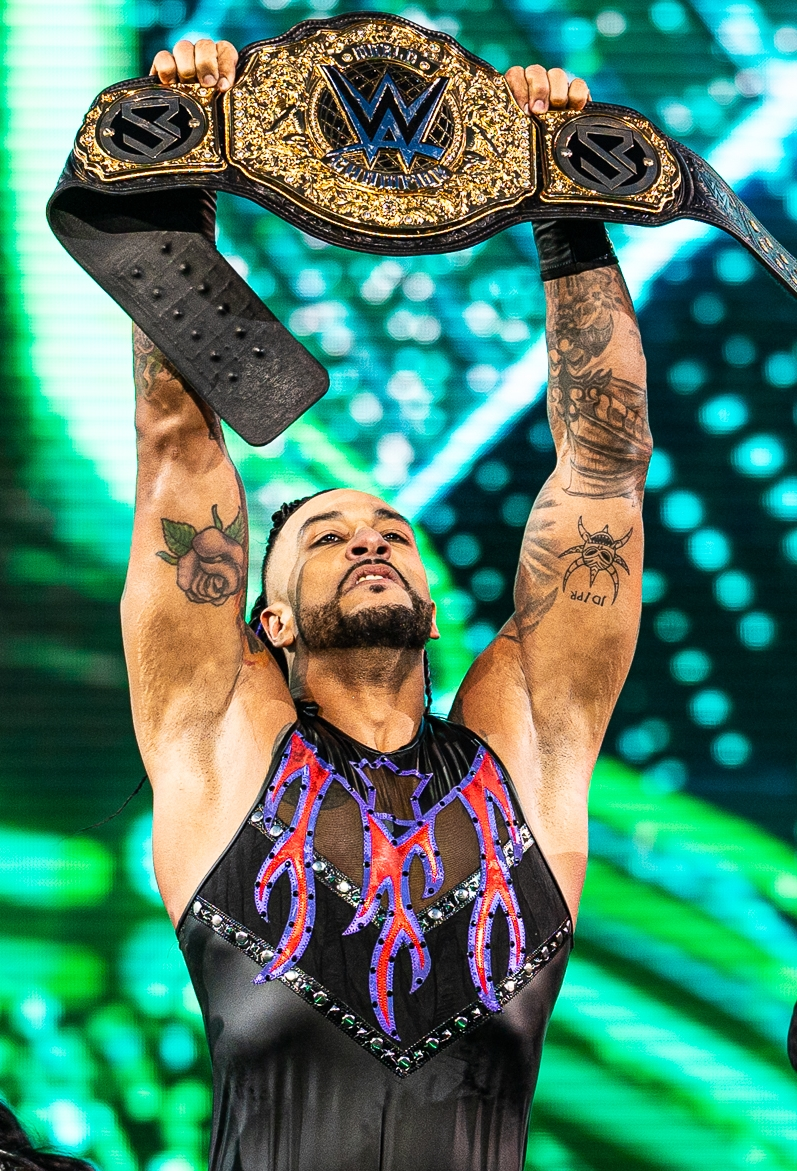
Damian Priest cashed in his Money in the Bank contract to win Raw's World Heavyweight Championship.

After the match, McIntyre let his wife hold the title, then walked over to the announce table to mock Punk, telling him not to come back, or he would end his career. After McIntyre did a crotch chop, Punk stood up and tripped McIntyre. Punk then removed the brace from his arm and hit McIntyre with it. 2023 Men's Money in the Bank winner Damian Priest then ran out to the ring with his briefcase, attacked McIntyre with it, and cashed in the contract. Priest immediately performed the South of Heaven on McIntyre and pinned him to win the title. This made him the first WWE world champion of Puerto Rican descent in over fifty years and only the second WWE world champion of Puerto Rican descent after Pedro Morales. This also made him the second person to cash in his briefcase at WrestleMania (after Rollins at WrestleMania 31 in 2015). McIntyre's reign lasted five minutes and 46 seconds.

Next, The Pride (Bobby Lashley, Angelo Dawkins, and Montez Ford, accompanied by B-Fab) faced The Final Testament (Karrion Kross, Akam, and Rezar, accompanied by Scarlett and Paul Ellering) in a Philadelphia Street Fight match. WWE Hall of Famer and rapper Snoop Dogg was the special guest commentator for the match, and WWE Hall of Famer Bubba Ray Dudley was introduced as the special guest referee. In the end, Kross bickered with Dudley and shoved him. Dudley then pulled out his Hansen Brothers glasses and put them on and then signaled to "Get The Tables". Ford and Dawkins grabbed a table and set it up inside the ring. Ford then performed a Frog Splash on Kross through the table. Lashley then pinned Kross to win the match. After the match, Snoop Dogg joined The Pride and Dudley inside the ring and celebrated with them.

After that, LA Knight faced AJ Styles. Before the match began, Knight and Styles ensued in a brawl. As Knight went for a superplex, Styles slipped under him and tripped him, causing Knight's head to hit the top turnbuckle pad. In the climax, Styles attempted the Phenomenal Forearm on Knight, who countered and performed the Blunt Force Trauma on Styles and pinned him to win his WrestleMania debut.

In the next match, Logan Paul (accompanied by the Prime energy drink mascot) defended the United States Championship against Randy Orton and Kevin Owens. Throughout the match, Orton and Owens double-teamed Paul. As Orton and Owens attempted to pin Paul, both men traded punches to each other, giving Paul the opportunity to roll outside. Owens attempted the Stunner on Orton, only for the latter to counter into the RKO for a nearfall. Paul then hit Orton with his brass knuckles for a nearfall. Orton set up for the Punt Kick, but the Prime mascot pulled Paul outside the ring and revealed himself as IShowSpeed. Orton then performed the RKO on IShowSpeed through the announce table. Back in the ring, Orton countered Owens's Pop-Up Powerbomb attempt into the RKO. Paul then threw Orton out of the ring and performed the Frog Splash on Owens and pinned him to retain the title.

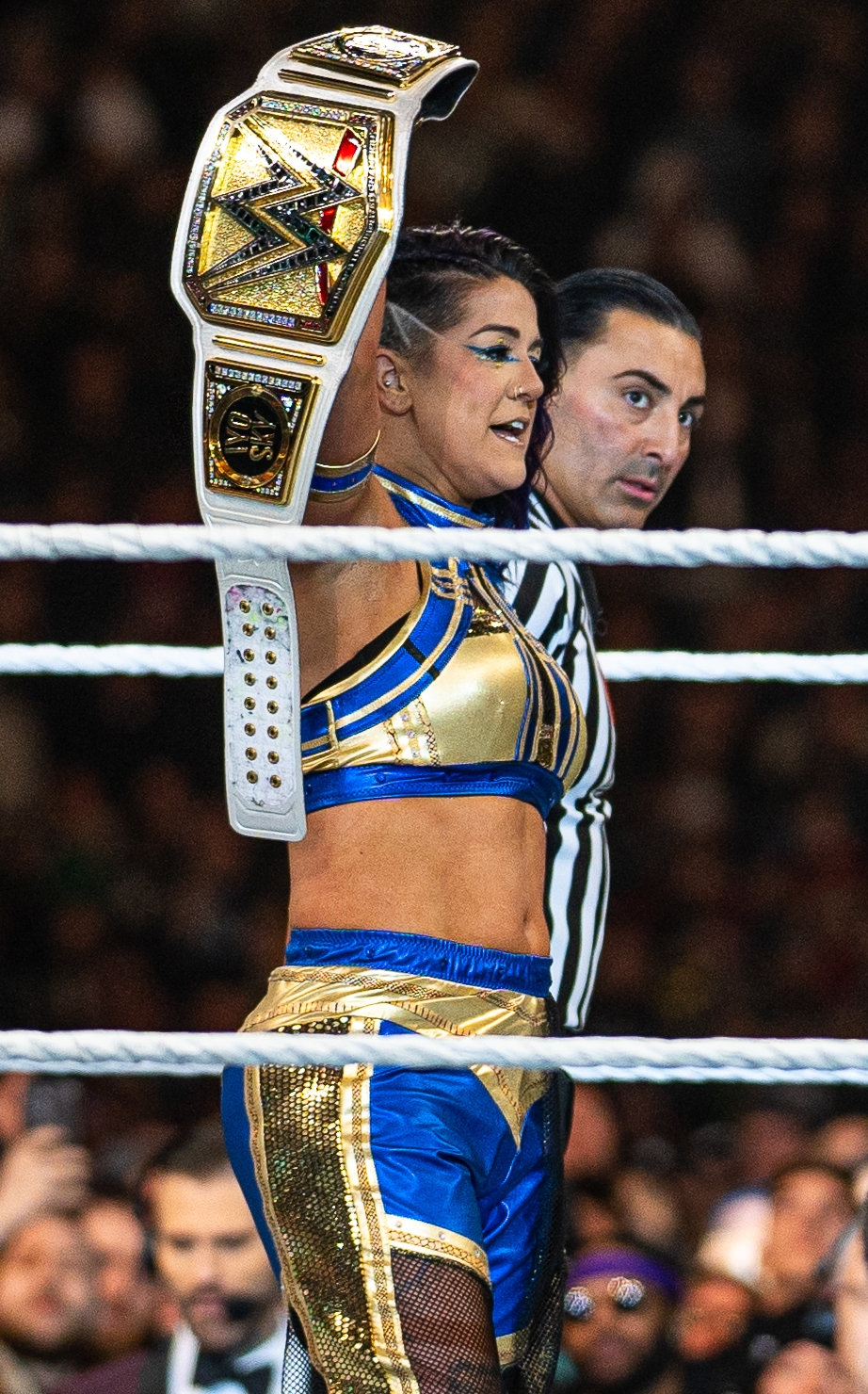
Bayley became a two-time WWE Women's Champion by defeating Iyo Sky.

In the penultimate match, Iyo Sky defended the WWE Women's Championship against Bayley. During the match, Sky performed two consecutive bridge suplexes on Bayley for a nearfall. Sky applied the STF and transitioned into a crossface, in which Bayley escaped and performed the Bayley to Belly on Sky for a nearfall. Sky performed an Over The Moonsault, but Bayley kicked out. After hitting Sky with an elbow drop, Bayley performed the Rose Plant and pinned Sky to win the title for a second time.

==== Main event ====
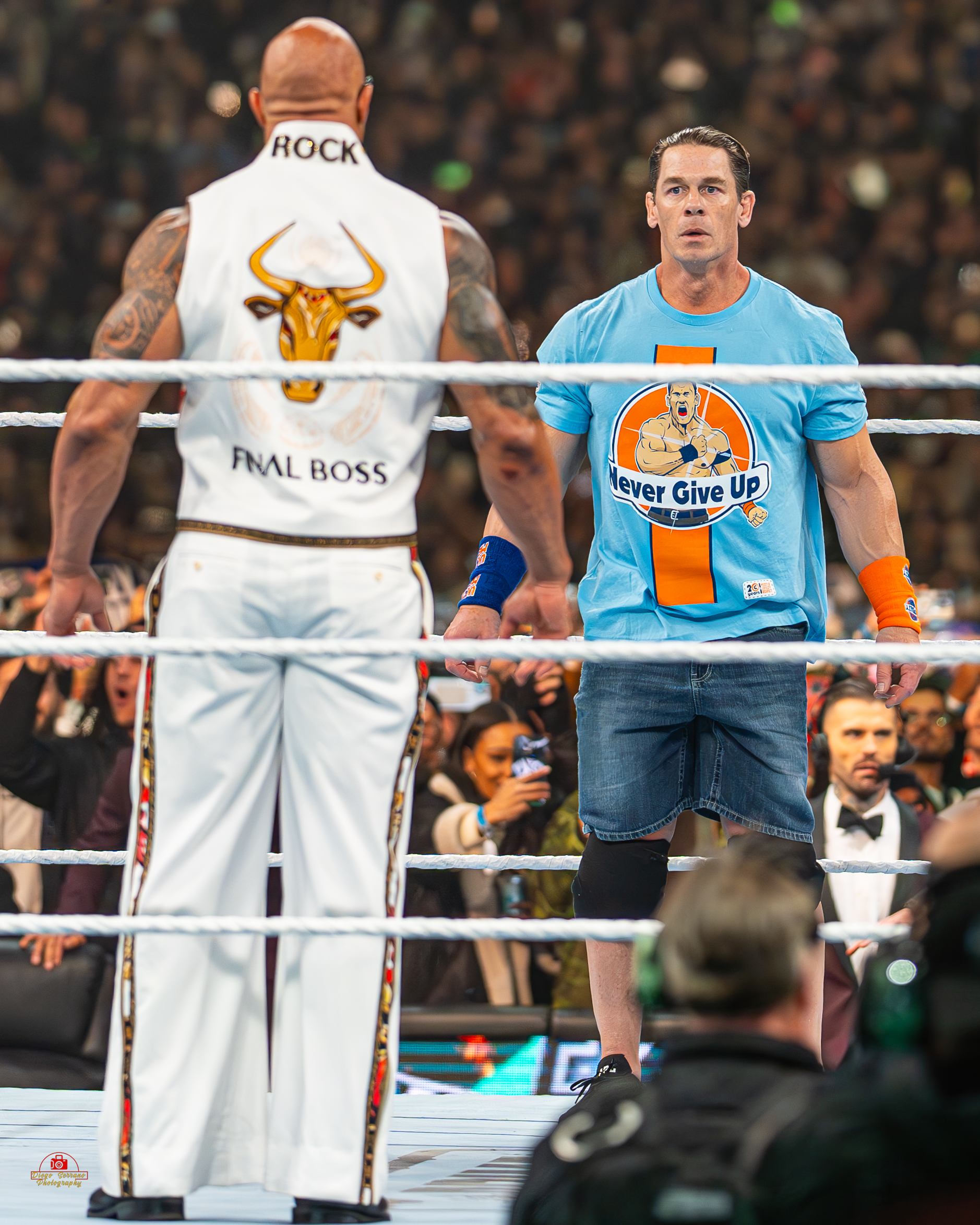
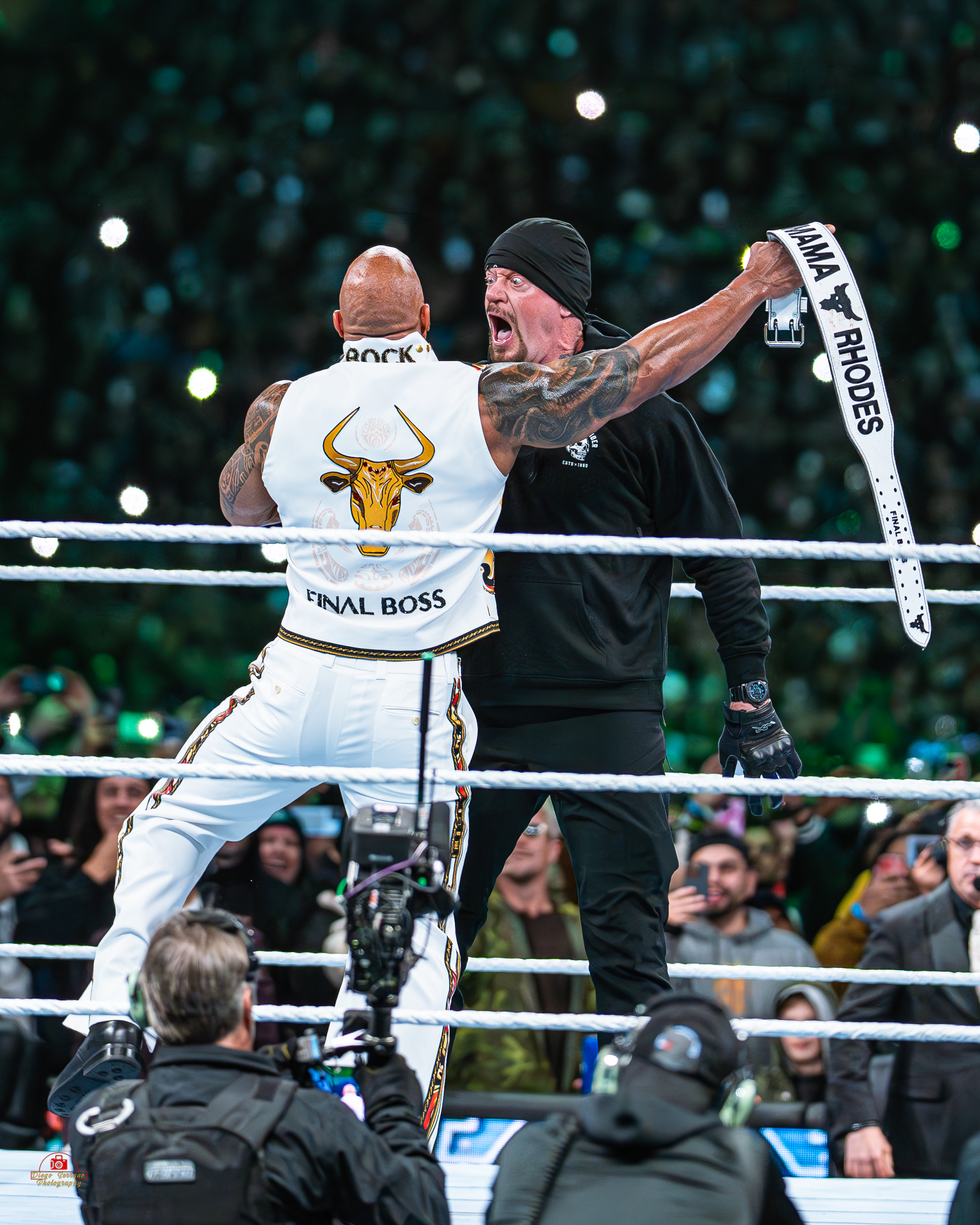
John Cena and The Undertaker both appeared in the main event to help Cody Rhodes against The Bloodline.

In the main event of Night 2, Roman Reigns (accompanied by Paul Heyman) defended the Undisputed WWE Universal Championship in a Bloodline Rules match against Cody Rhodes. During the match, Reigns and Rhodes fought into the crowd, where Rhodes suplexed Reigns on a table. Back in the ring, Reigns performed a back suplex and a fisherman's suplex on Rhodes for nearfalls. Outside the ring, Reigns performed a low blow on Rhodes before powerbombing him through an announce table. The two continued to fight back in the ring, where Rhodes performed the Cross Rhodes on Reigns, but as he attempted a second, Jimmy Uso attacked Rhodes. However, Jey Uso ran in. The two fought up the entrance ramp and Jey speared Jimmy off the ramp through tables. Reigns applied the guillotine choke, but Rhodes forced himself and Reigns out of the ring, where Rhodes speared Reigns through the barricade. Much like the previous year's WrestleMania, Rhodes performed the Cross Rhodes on Reigns twice, only for Solo Sikoa to appear and perform a Samoan Spike on Rhodes just before the third attempt.

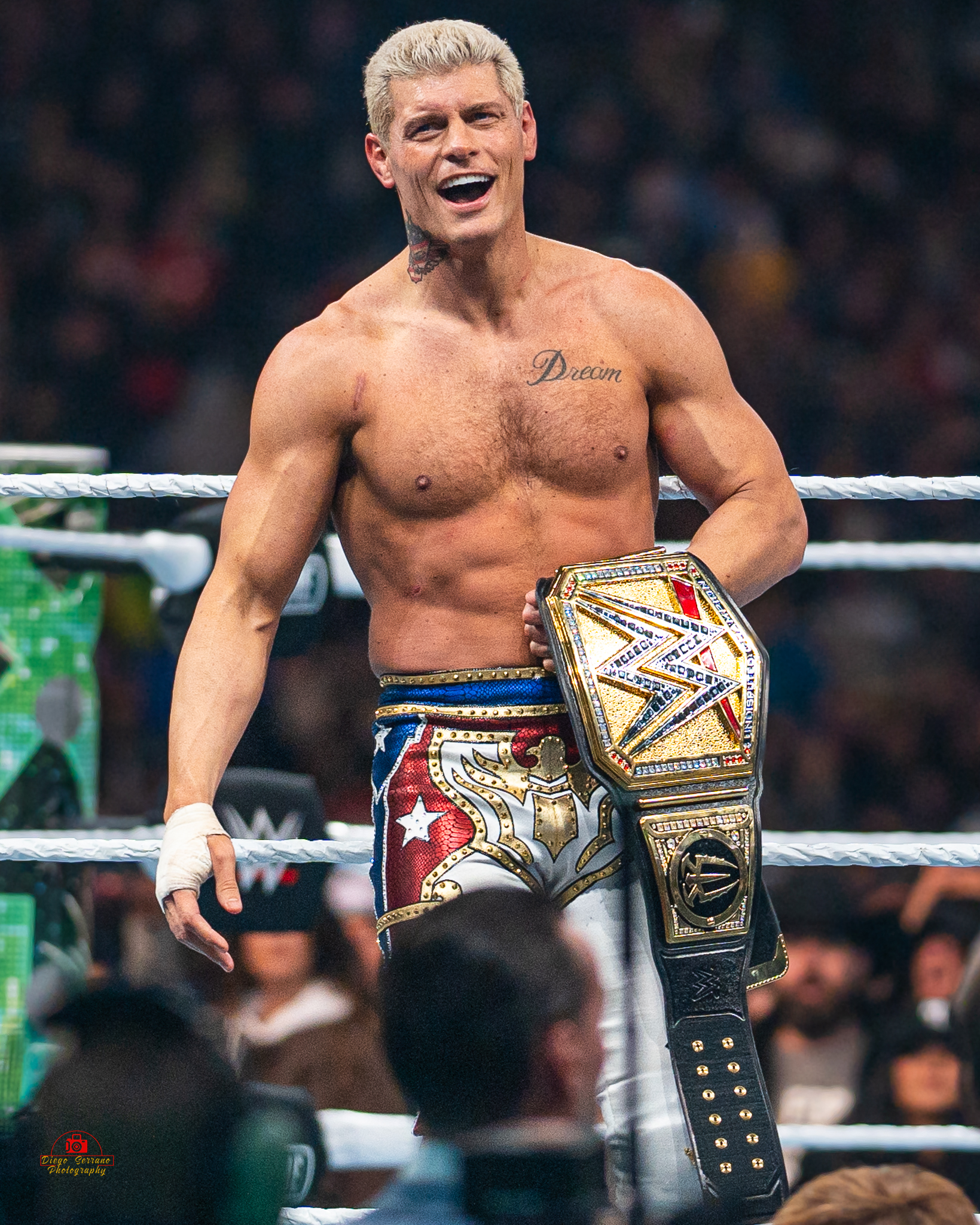
Cody Rhodes finished his story by dethroning Roman Reigns and winning SmackDown's Undisputed WWE Championship for the first time in his career.

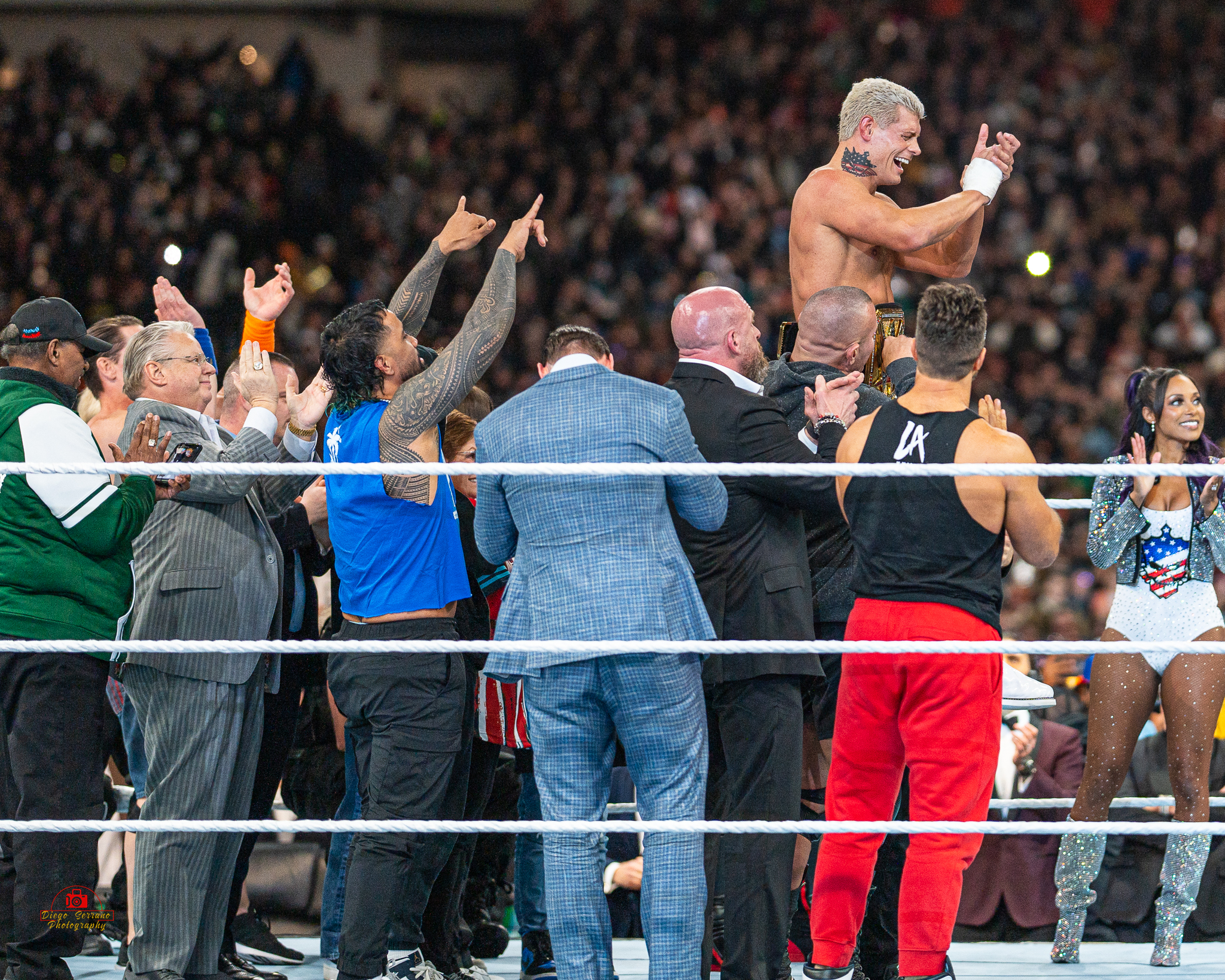
Cody Rhodes celebrating his title win with family and friends.

However, even after a Samoan Spike/Spear combination by Sikoa and Reigns, Rhodes kicked out. John Cena, who had his own issues with The Bloodline, then ran down and hit Attitude Adjustments on both Sikoa and Reigns (the one on Sikoa being through the announce table). The Rock appeared and after a stare-down with his old rival, performed a Rock Bottom on Cena. The Shield's music hit, and Seth "Freakin" Rollins, who was wearing the stable's old gear, arrived with a chair, but before he could hit Rock with it, he was taken out by Reigns with a Superman Punch. Rock was about to attack Rhodes with the weight belt, but The Undertaker then appeared and took out Rock with a chokeslam. With chaos unfolding around the ring, Reigns had the opportunity to take out Rhodes with a chair, but instead decided to hit Rollins in the back with the chair (as deliberate revenge for Rollins betraying Reigns in the same way that caused the Shield's breakup 10 years prior) before throwing it away. Reigns attempted to spear Rhodes, but Rhodes countered the move and hit three successive Cross Rhodes and then pinned Reigns to finish his story of becoming WWE Champion, and also ending Reigns's 1,316 day reign as Universal Champion and 735 day reign as WWE Champion, respectively, the fourth and seventh longest world championship reigns in WWE history. (Note: Upon Cody Rhodes's loss at WrestleMania 41 in April 2025, WWE officially retired the WWE Universal Championship. WWE would also amend the Universal title's lineage by retroactively recognizing Roman Reigns as the last champion, and removing Rhodes's reign from the title's lineage (WWE had originally recognized Rhodes as both the WWE and Universal Champions up until this point).) After the match, Rhodes celebrated with many main roster wrestlers and WWE legends, as well as his family, and Brodie Lee Jr.

== Reception ==
WrestleMania XL had an attendance of 60,036 for Night 1 and 60,203 for Night 2. During the event, WWE marketed a higher attendance of 72,543 and 72,755 respectively. Variety reported that the event was the most-streamed "entertainment event" ever on Peacock, viewed for 1.3 billion minutes over the weekend of April 6–7.

The Undisputed WWE Universal Championship match between Roman Reigns and Cody Rhodes was universally praised. Wade Keller of Pro Wrestling Torch called it "a mega-spectacle of a match", stating that the only downfall was that the near falls before the slew of interferences occurred "didn't really resonate as possible finishes since the Bloodline Rules advantage hadn't come into play yet", but "once it did, it delivered huge pops". Keller stated that he "loved the idea of other top babyfaces celebrating with Cody, as Dusty Rhodes did that when he won NWA World Titles".

Chris Mueller of Bleacher Report and Brent Brookhouse of CBS Sports called it "overbooked in the best way". Brookhouse stated that there was a "plodding" beginning because "everyone knew the mess of interference" from The Bloodline would be coming, and that "Rhodes getting help from Jey Uso, Cena, Rollins and Undertaker was the kind of wild mess that only makes sense at WrestleMania".

Philip Sledge of Cinemablend described the match, and the appearances by The Rock, John Cena, and The Undertaker, as being WWE's "Avengers: Endgame moment".

John Canton of TJR Wrestling rated the Reigns-Rhodes match 4 1/2 stars out of 5, calling it "a lot of fun to watch in person", and praising the chemistry between Reigns and Rhodes, the booking of the match, and the finish, stating that it was "main event WWE pro wrestling at its best". He rated the event as a whole an 8 1/2 out of 10, giving the first night an 8 1/4 and the second an 8 3/4, whilst calling the show "one of the best WrestleManias of all time".

Writing for the Wrestling Observer Newsletter, for Night One, Dave Meltzer rated the Women's World Championship match a score of 4 1/4 stars out of five, the Six-Pack Tag Team Ladder Match 4 1/4 stars, the Mysterio-Escobar led tag team match 3 3/4 stars, the Jey Uso-Jimmy Uso bout three-quarters of a star (the lowest score of the event), the six-woman tag team match two stars, the Intercontinental Championship match 4 1/2 stars, and the main event receiving 4 stars. For Night Two, he gave the World Heavyweight Championship match between Rollins and McIntyre 3 1/2 stars, the Philadelphia Street Fight 1 3/4 stars, the LA Knight-AJ Styles match 3 1/2 stars, the United States Championship Triple Threat match 4 1/4 stars, the WWE Women's Championship match 4 1/2 stars, and the Bloodline Rules main event between Reigns and Rhodes 4 3/4 stars (the highest score of the event).

== Aftermath ==
In addition to the majority of countries moving to Netflix in January 2025, this would also be the final WrestleMania to air on SonyLIV in India following the expiration of WWE's contract with SonyLIV with India then moving to Netflix on April 1, 2025.

=== Raw ===
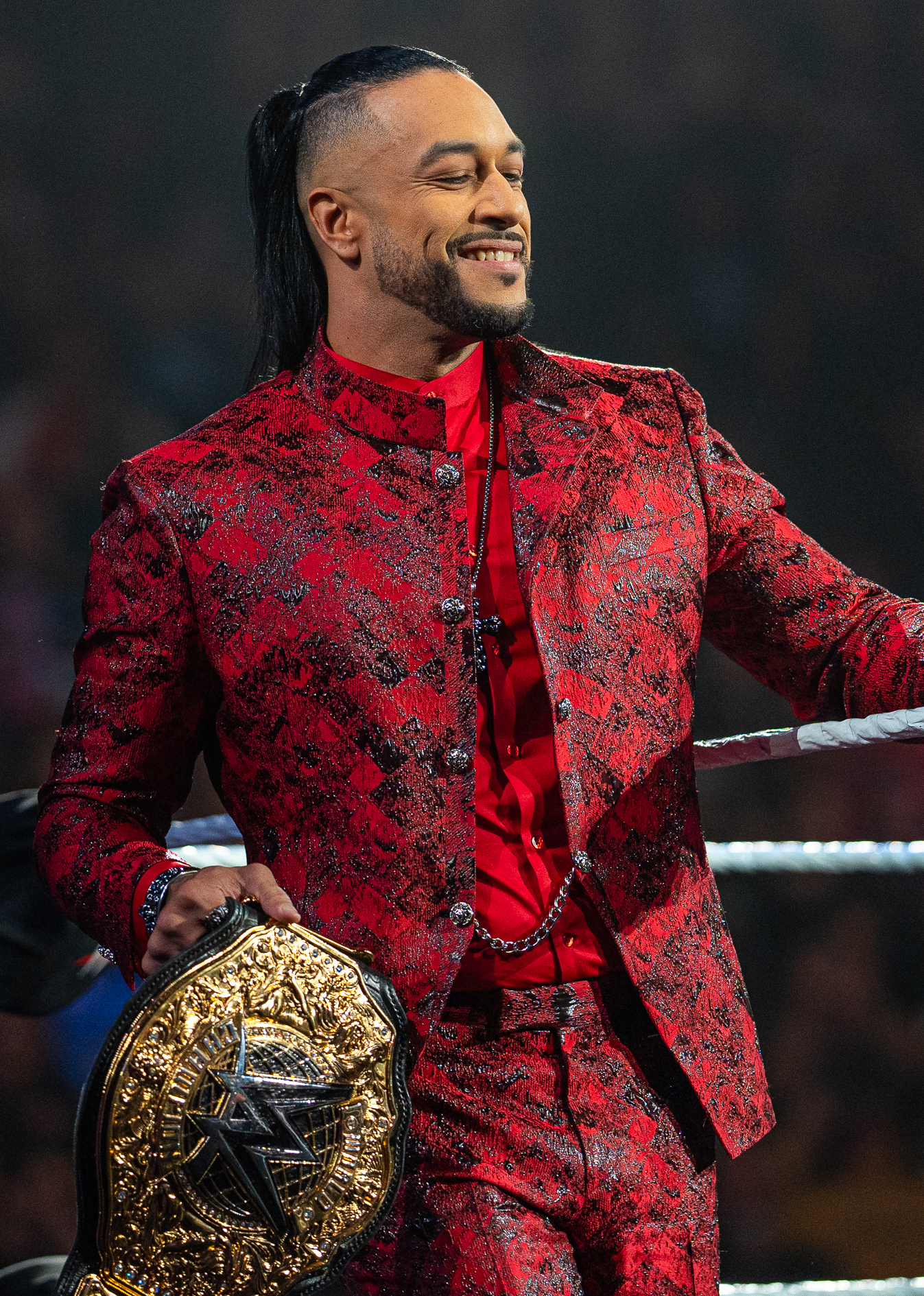
Damian Priest as Raw's World Heavyweight Champion after WrestleMania XL.

Cody Rhodes, now recognized as the Undisputed WWE Champion, opened the post-WrestleMania episode of Raw, where he talked about his win. The Rock interrupted and congratulated Rhodes on winning the title before the two exchanged holding the others' titles. Rhodes then announced that Rock was his boss and the two teased a future match between each other. On the February 21, 2025, episode of SmackDown, Rhodes reignited a storyline with Rock, which involved Rock cryptically stating that he wanted Rhodes' soul. At Elimination Chamber: Toronto on March 1, Rhodes rejected Rock's offer, which then prompted John Cena, who had just won the Elimination Chamber match to earn a title shot against Rhodes at WrestleMania 41, to attack Rhodes and turn heel for the first time since 2003. On Night 2 of the event on April 20, Rhodes lost the title to Cena via interference from his ally, Travis Scott, and a low blow from Cena, ending his reign at 378 days.

After WrestleMania XL, Seth "Freakin" Rollins was out of action with a knee injury. He returned on the June 17 episode of Raw, stating his intentions to reclaim the World Heavyweight Championship. Rollins was about to announce his participation in the Money in the Bank ladder match when Damian Priest interrupted. He said that out of respect, he had actually wanted to cash-in on Rollins at WrestleMania, and both noted their similarities on their first world title wins being Money in the Bank cash-ins at WrestleMania, with Rollins's occurring at WrestleMania 31 in March 2015. Priest then challenged Rollins to a match at Money in the Bank with the title on the line and Rollins accepted. At the event, Priest retained by pinning Drew McIntyre (who cashed-in his Money in the Bank contract, which he had won earlier that night, while the match was in progress) after McIntyre was attacked by CM Punk, which in turn meant that Rollins failed to regain the title.

Gunther made his first WWE appearance since WrestleMania XL on the April 22 episode of Raw, when he announced he would partake in the King of the Ring tournament. On the same episode, Giovanni Vinci (who would later be drafted to SmackDown) was kicked out of Imperium by Ludwig Kaiser, who had assaulted him after their scheduled match; afterward, Kaiser was fined. At the aftermath of the next week's Raw show, Gunther accepted Kaiser kicking out Vinci. After Kaiser and Gunther were kept on Raw during the 2024 WWE Draft, it was announced that Gunther would face off against a returning Sheamus in the first round of the King of the Ring tournament. On the May 6 episode, Gunther defeated Sheamus in what Sheamus deemed the last match between them. The next week, he defeated Kofi Kingston in a quarterfinal bout, then defeated Jey Uso in the semifinals on May 20, and finally Randy Orton in the finals at the King and Queen of the Ring event, albeit controversially, after Orton had a shoulder up during the match's ending crucifix pinfall, to win the tournament, earning a World Heavyweight Championship match at that year's SummerSlam event. On the July 15 episode of Raw, leading up to the match against then-champion Damian Priest, Gunther would prefer into Priest's personal life by referring to Priest (and later the entirety of The Judgment Day on the next week's episode of Raw) as "street trash", and stating that he had been "begged" to be signed by WWE. In the same segment on Raw, Priest would refer to Gunther as "boring", "conceited" and "privileged". At the event on August 3, Gunther defeated Priest to win the World Heavyweight Championship for the first time in his career, notably after interference from Judgment Day member Finn Bálor who costed Priest the match, leading to Priest being kicked out of The Judgment Day.

Since winning the Intercontinental Championship, Sami Zayn then gave Chad Gable a title shot on the April 15 episode of Raw as a token of gratitude for assisting him in defeating Gunther, where Zayn successfully defended the title. As he was celebrating with his wife at ringside after the match, Gable would attack him in front of his wife, turning heel in the process. On the April 29 episode, Zayn defended his title against Bronson Reed, which he won by disqualification after Gable attacked him. One week later, Zayn attacked Gable during his match with Reed, causing another disqualification. Later that night, Zayn announced that he would defend his title against Gable and Reed in a triple threat match at King and Queen of the Ring, where Zayn retained his title after pinning Reed. At Clash at the Castle, Zayn defeated Gable to retain the title, ending their feud. Zayn would defend the title against Bron Breakker at Money in the Bank before losing to Breakker at SummerSlam. At the same time, Gable left the Alpha Academy and was quashed by the debuting The Wyatt Sicks stable backstage. He would go on to form a stable with the Creed Brothers known as American Made.

On the post-WrestleMania episode of Raw, The Judgment Day talked about Damian Priest's World Heavyweight Championship win when Raw Tag Team Champions Awesome Truth (R-Truth and The Miz) interrupted. A six-man tag team match then took place which saw Miz, R-Truth, and John Cena, who joined the match in progress, defeat Finn Bálor, "Dirty" Dominik Mysterio, and JD McDonagh. Later that night, Jey Uso won a fatal four-way match to become the number one contender for the World Heavyweight Championship at Backlash, where Priest retained the title after interference from Bálor and McDonagh, after Priest asked them not to interfere.

During the fatal four-way match, CM Punk prevented Drew McIntyre from winning. Punk additionally prevented McIntyre from winning the World Heavyweight Championship at Clash at the Castle: Scotland in McIntyre's home country, and Money in the Bank after McIntyre cashed-in the eponymous contract which he had won earlier that night. Punk and McIntyre would then have a trilogy of matches: the first at SummerSlam, where Seth "Freakin" Rollins served as the special guest referee and McIntyre won; the second at Bash at Berlin in a strap match, which was won by Punk; and the third and final match at Bad Blood in October, where Punk defeated McIntyre inside Hell in a Cell.

Women's World Champion Rhea Ripley was attacked backstage by Liv Morgan and was forced to vacate the title the following week. A battle royal then took place on the April 22 episode to determine the new champion, which was won by Becky Lynch. Lynch would drop the title to Morgan at King and Queen of the Ring and lost a rematch for the title in a steel cage match two days later on Raw. After that, Lynch would take an extended hiatus from wrestling. Ripley would return on the July 8 episode of Raw to confront Morgan, which set up a match for the championship at SummerSlam. Morgan would retain the title after "Dirty" Dominik Mysterio betrayed Ripley, leading to Ripley's removal and Morgan's addition to The Judgment Day. Morgan and Ripley would feud until the Raw debut episode on Netflix on January 6, 2025, where Ripley defeated Morgan to regain the title. Lynch would return on Night 2 of WrestleMania 41, where she would team up with the inaugural WWE Women's Intercontinental Champion Lyra Valkyria to defeat Morgan and Raquel Rodriguez for the WWE Women's Tag Team Championship.

On the April 15 episode of Raw, the Raw Tag Team Championship was renamed as the World Tag Team Championship with Triple H presenting Awesome Truth (The Miz and R-Truth) with a new set of championship belts. The following week, Awesome Truth defeated #DIY (Johnny Gargano and Tommaso Ciampa) to retain the title. On the May 13 episode, Finn Bálor and JD McDonagh won a fatal four-way tag team match to become the number one contenders. After a failed attempt the following week, they would eventually win the title on the June 24 episode after interference from Women's World Champion Liv Morgan, ending Awesome Truth's reign at 79 days. Miz would turn on R-Truth on the September 30 episode of Raw, ending their stint as a tag team.

=== SmackDown ===
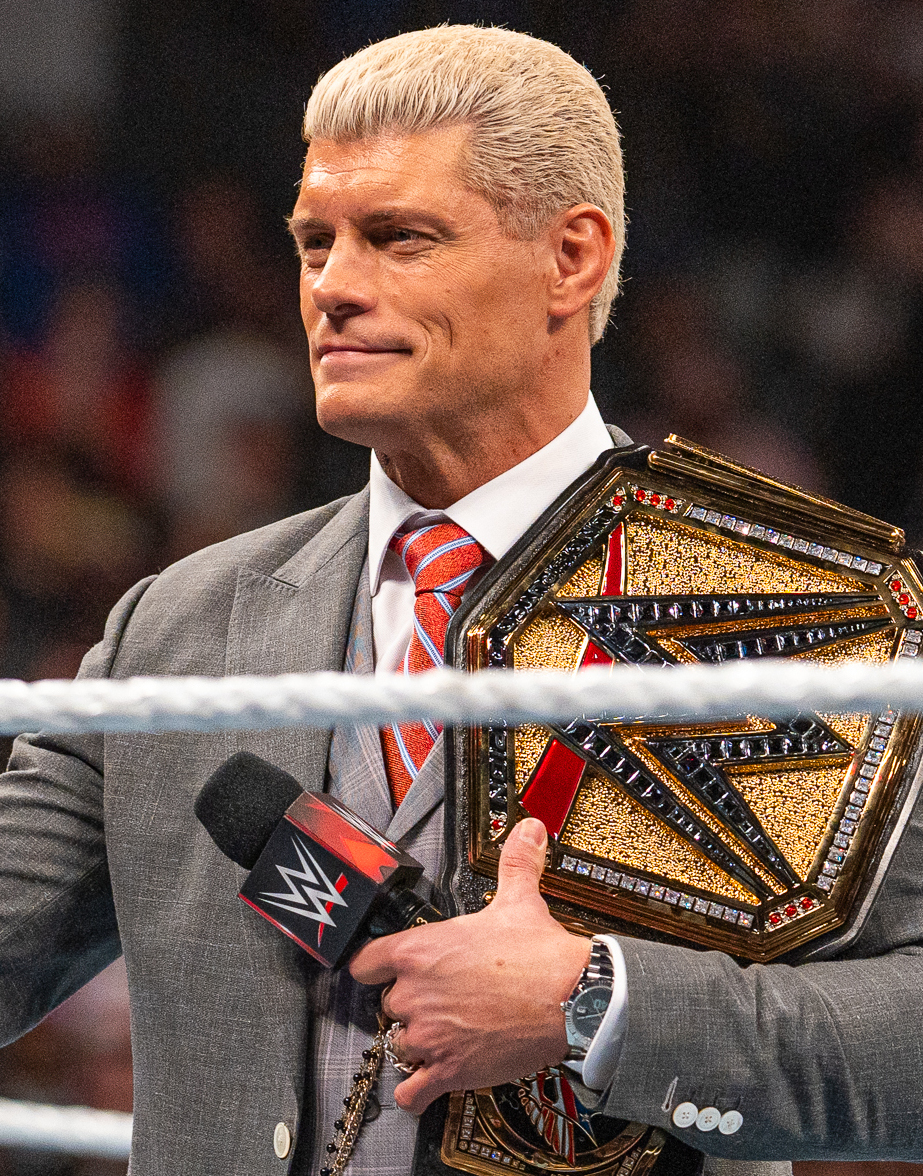
Cody Rhodes as SmackDown's Undisputed WWE Champion after WrestleMania XL.

After Roman Reigns lost the Undisputed WWE Championship, he went on a hiatus and Solo Sikoa, the group's enforcer, became the de facto leader of The Bloodline. The formation was changed on the April 12 episode of SmackDown, when Jimmy Uso was kicked out of the group and recruited Tama Tonga, Tonga Loa (formerly Camacho), and Jacob Fatu as the new members of the stable. At Backlash, Sikoa teamed up with Tama to defeat Randy Orton and Kevin Owens with the help of the returning Tonga Loa. In the following weeks, Sikoa kicked out Paul Heyman from the stable and usurped Reigns as the leader and as Tribal Chief. After beginning a feud with Cody Rhodes at Clash at the Castle: Scotland, Sikoa along with Tama and Fatu defeated Rhodes, Orton, and Owens at Money in the Bank in a six-man tag team match with Sikoa pinning Rhodes. On the July 12 episode of SmackDown, Rhodes and Sikoa set up a match for SummerSlam. In the main event of the August 2 episode of SmackDown, the night before SummerSlam, Fatu and Tama defeated #DIY (Johnny Gargano and Tommaso Ciampa) to win the WWE Tag Team Championship. At the event on August 3, Sikoa failed to win the title from Rhodes in a Bloodline Rules match after interference from the returning Reigns. Rhodes and Reigns would reluctantly team up to face Sikoa and Fatu at Bad Blood in October, where they won due to interference from a returning Jimmy. Reigns would then make amends with Jey Uso and Sami Zayn, leading Reigns, Jimmy, Jey, and Zayn to reunite as "The Original Bloodline". The rivalry between the two iterations of The Bloodline continued until Survivor Series: WarGames, where Reigns's Bloodline defeated Sikoa's Bloodline; although the feud between Sikoa and Reigns culminated in a Tribal Combat on the Raw debut episode on Netflix where Reigns defeated Sikoa, reclaiming the Tribal Chief title and the Ula Fala. After Sikoa's defeat, the group stopped using "The Bloodline" name on-air when his faction was renamed to "MFT" (as is "My Family Tree") following the additions of JC Mateo and Talla Tonga and the exit of Fatu in mid-2025.

During this time, LA Knight and AJ Styles won their respective triple threat matches to face each other in a WrestleMania rematch to determine Cody Rhodes' challenger for the Undisputed WWE Championship at Backlash France, which was won by Styles. Rhodes would defeat Styles retain at the event. On the May 31 episode of SmackDown, Styles seemingly announced his retirement, and called out Rhodes for a passing of the torch moment; however, after celebrating, Styles viciously attacked Rhodes. This led to an "I Quit" match between the two for the title at Clash at the Castle: Scotland, where Rhodes retained once again.

The following week on the April 19 episode of SmackDown, Bayley defended the WWE Women's Championship for the first time against Naomi, but the match ended in a no contest after Tiffany Stratton attacked both Naomi and Bayley. At Backlash France on May 4, Bayley successfully defeated Naomi and Stratton in a triple threat match to retain her title. At Clash at the Castle: Scotland on June 15, Bayley successfully retained her title against Piper Niven in the latter's home country. At SummerSlam on August 3, Bayley lost the title to Queen of the Ring winner Nia Jax, ending her reign at 118 days.

The rivalry between Damage CTRL (Iyo Sky, Kairi Sane, Dakota Kai, and Asuka) and Bianca Belair, Jade Cargill, and Naomi continued after WrestleMania XL. On the April 26 episode of SmackDown, The Kabuki Warriors (Asuka and Sane) were scheduled to defend the WWE Women's Tag Team Championship against Belair and Cargill at Backlash France. At the event, Belair and Cargill defeated Asuka and Sane to win the titles.

On the April 19 episode of SmackDown, the SmackDown Tag Team Championship was renamed as the WWE Tag Team Championship with Triple H presenting A-Town Down Under (Austin Theory and Grayson Waller) with a new set of championship belts. They would lose the title to #DIY (Johnny Gargano and Tommaso Ciampa) on the July 5 episode of SmackDown, ending their reign at 90 days.

On the May 10 episode of SmackDown, SmackDown General Manager Nick Aldis announced that Logan Paul would be the next opponent against Undisputed WWE Champion Cody Rhodes and a Champion vs. Champion match was scheduled for King and Queen of the Ring. On the following episode, during the contract signing for the match, the contract stated that the match would be for both titles. However, when Paul was about to sign the contract, he tore it up, before bringing out his own contract, which stated that only Rhodes' title would be on the line. After Paul mocked Rhodes, he signed the contract, confirming that the match would only be for Rhodes' title. At the event on May 25, Paul failed to win the title from Rhodes after interference from special guest ring announcer Ibrahim Al Hajjaj. At SummerSlam on August 3, Paul lost the title to LA Knight, ending his reign at 273 days.

== Results ==
Night 1
No.	Results	Stipulations	Times
1	Rhea Ripley (c) defeated Becky Lynch by pinfall	Singles match for the Women's World Championship	17:05
2	A-Town Down Under (Austin Theory and Grayson Waller) and Awesome Truth (The Miz and R-Truth) defeated The Judgment Day (Finn Bálor and Damian Priest) (c), #DIY (Johnny Gargano and Tommaso Ciampa), The New Day (Kofi Kingston and Xavier Woods), and New Catch Republic (Pete Dunne and Tyler Bate) by retrieving the SmackDown Tag Team Championship belts and Raw Tag Team Championship belts, respectively	Six-Pack Tag Team Ladder match for the Undisputed WWE Tag Team Championship (Note: The name "Undisputed WWE Tag Team Championship" referred to both the Raw Tag Team Championship and SmackDown Tag Team Championship being held and defended together, although both titles remained independently active. Upon the conclusion of this match, the titles were split.); Both sets of titles had to be retrieved for the match to end.	17:25
3	Rey Mysterio and Andrade (with Carlito, Cruz Del Toro, Joaquin Wilde, and Zelina Vega) defeated Santos Escobar and "Dirty" Dominik Mysterio (with Angel, Berto, and Elektra Lopez) by pinfall	Tag team match	11:05
4	Jey Uso defeated Jimmy Uso by pinfall	Singles match	11:05
5	Jade Cargill, Bianca Belair, and Naomi defeated Damage CTRL (Dakota Kai, Asuka, and Kairi Sane) by pinfall	Six-woman tag team match	8:05
6	Sami Zayn defeated Gunther (c) by pinfall	Singles match for the WWE Intercontinental Championship	15:30
7	The Bloodline (The Rock and Roman Reigns) (with Paul Heyman) defeated Cody Rhodes and Seth "Freakin" Rollins by pinfall	Tag team match Since Rock and Reigns won, the Undisputed WWE Universal Championship match on Night 2 was held under Bloodline Rules. Had Rhodes and Rollins won, all members of The Bloodline would have been barred from ringside during the championship match.	44:35
(c) / – the champion(s) heading into the match

Night 2
No.	Results	Stipulations	Times
1	Drew McIntyre defeated Seth "Freakin" Rollins (c) by pinfall	Singles match for the World Heavyweight Championship	10:30
2	Damian Priest defeated Drew McIntyre (c) by pinfall	Singles match for the World Heavyweight Championship; This was Priest's Money in the Bank cash-in match.	0:09
3	The Pride (Bobby Lashley, Angelo Dawkins, and Montez Ford) (with B-Fab) defeated The Final Testament (Karrion Kross, Akam, and Rezar) (with Scarlett and Paul Ellering) by pinfall	Philadelphia Street Fight; Bubba Ray Dudley was the special guest referee.	8:35
4	LA Knight defeated AJ Styles by pinfall	Singles match	12:25
5	Logan Paul (c) (with IShowSpeed) (Note: Speed had accompanied Logan Paul to the ring disguised as a Prime bottle; his identity was unveiled midway through the match.) defeated Kevin Owens and Randy Orton by pinfall	Triple threat match for the WWE United States Championship	17:40
6	Bayley defeated Iyo Sky (c) by pinfall	Singles match for the WWE Women's Championship	14:20
7	Cody Rhodes defeated Roman Reigns (c) (with Paul Heyman) by pinfall	Bloodline Rules match for the Undisputed WWE Universal Championship (Note: The name "Undisputed WWE Universal Championship" referred to both the WWE Championship and Universal Championship being held and defended together, although both titles remained independently active despite the undisputed championship being represented by one title belt. Upon the conclusion of this match, the Universal Championship was officially retired with Reigns recognized as the final holder, while the WWE Championship became referred to as the Undisputed WWE Championship.)	33:25
(c) / – the champion(s) heading into the match

=== Six-Pack Tag Team Ladder Match SmackDown Qualifier Tournament ===
1st Round; SmackDown; March 15–22, 2024
Latino World Order (Joaquin Wilde and Cruz Del Toro)	9:12
Legado Del Fantasma (Angel and Berto)	Pinfall
Bracket #1
New Catch Republic (Pete Dunne and Tyler Bate)	Pinfall
Pretty Deadly (Elton Prince and Kit Wilson)	11:14
A-Town Down Under (Austin Theory and Grayson Waller)	Pinfall
The O.C. (Luke Gallows and Karl Anderson)	7:19
Bracket #2
Street Profits (Angelo Dawkins and Montez Ford)	Pinfall
The Authors of Pain (Akam and Rezar)	8:37

Finals; SmackDown; March 29, 2024
Legado Del Fantasma (Angel and Berto)	7:19
New Catch Republic	Pinfall
A-Town Down Under	Pinfall
Street Profits	6:20
