= Intercontinental Championship =

Intercontinental Championship may refer to:

- WWE Intercontinental Championship, a men's professional wrestling championship created and promoted by the American professional wrestling promotion WWE
- WWE Women's Intercontinental Championship, a women's professional wrestling championship created and promoted by the American professional wrestling promotion WWE
- WWF Intercontinental Tag Team Championship, a former professional wrestling championship created and promoted by the American professional wrestling promotion World Wrestling Federation
- IWGP Intercontinental Championship, a former professional wrestling championship owned by the New Japan Pro-Wrestling (NJPW) promotion
- Intercontinental Championship for the King Fahd Cup (later renamed to FIFA Confederations Cup), international association football tournament for men's national teams
