= Tag team championships in WWE =

Listing of professional wrestling tag team championships

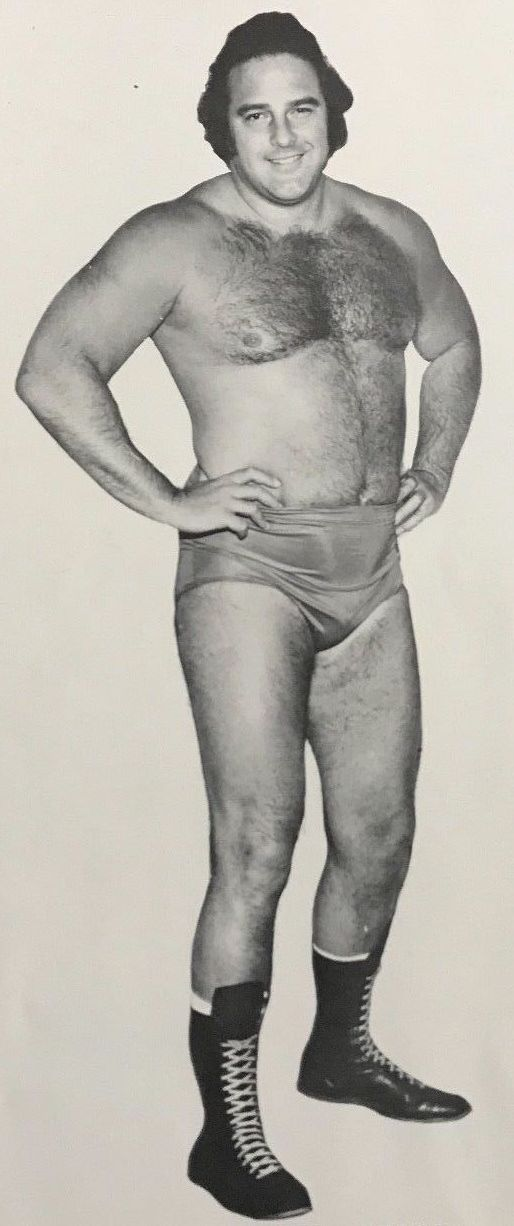
Mark Lewin and Don Curtis, the inaugural holders of the WWWF United States Tag Team Championship, at the time known as a version of the NWA United States Tag Team Championship.

The American professional wrestling promotion WWE has maintained several men's and women's tag team championships (except for a two-year interim between 1967 and 1969) since Capitol Wrestling Corporation (CWC) seceded from the National Wrestling Alliance (NWA) in 1963 to become the World Wide Wrestling Federation (WWWF), which was later subjected to various name changes, including World Wrestling Federation (WWF) and World Wrestling Entertainment (WWE)—in April 2011, the company ceased using its full name and has since just been referred to as WWE.

The earliest men's tag team title affiliated to Capitol, the Northeast version of the NWA World Tag Team Championship, established in 1957 by Toots Mondt's Manhattan Wrestling Enterprises and later shared with the CWC, entirely preceded the WWWF's creation as it was deactivated in June 1961, while the first women's tag team title, the WWF Women's Tag Team Championship, was established in 1983. Whenever the WWE brand extension has been implemented (2002–2011; 2016–present), separate tag team championships have been created or allocated for each brand.

As of 2025, since the acquisition of Lucha Libre AAA Worldwide, WWE promotes five men's, one women's, and one mixed gender tag team championships. Three of the men's titles, the World Tag Team Championship on Raw, the WWE Tag Team Championship on SmackDown, and AAA World Tag Team Championship on AAA are regarded as world tag team championships, while the third men's title is for WWE's developmental brand, NXT, the NXT Tag Team Championship. The WWE Women's Tag Team Championship is the only women's tag team championship in WWE and is defended across Raw, SmackDown, and NXT. In addition, the company also promotes the AAA Mixed Tag Team Championship and the AAA World Trios Championship.

== Overview of titles ==
=== Male ===
#	Name	Years	Status
1	WWWF United States Tag Team Championship	1958 – 1967 (became WWWF property in 1963)	Retired
2	WWF International Tag Team Championship	1969 – 1971, 1985	Retired
3	World Tag Team Championship (original version)	1971 – 2010	Unified with World Tag Team Championship (current version) 2009, subsequently retired 2010.
4	WCW World Tag Team Championship	1975 – 2001 (became WWF property in 2001)	Unified with World Tag Team Championship (original version)
5	WWF Intercontinental Tag Team Championship	1991	Retired
6	World Tag Team Championship (current version)	2002 – present	Active
7	AAA World Tag Team Championship	2007 – present (became WWE property in 2025)	Active
8	AAA World Trios Championship	2011 – present (became WWE property in 2025)	Active
9	WWE Tag Team Championship	2016 – present	Active

=== Male Developmental ===
#	Name	Years	Status
1	NXT Tag Team Championship	2013 – present	Active
2	NXT UK Tag Team Championship	2018 – 2022	Unified with NXT Tag Team Championship

=== Female ===
#	Name	Years	Status
1	WWF Women's Tag Team Championship	1983 – 1989	Retired
2	WWE Women's Tag Team Championship	2018 – present	Active

=== Female Developmental ===
#	Name	Years	Status
1	NXT Women's Tag Team Championship	2021 - 2023	Retired

=== Mixed Gender ===
#	Name	Years	Status
1	AAA Mixed Tag Team Championship	2003 - present (became WWE property in 2025)	Active

== Summary of championships ==
=== Male ===
==== WWWF United States Tag Team Championship (1958–1967) ====
The WWWF United States Tag Team Championship was the first men's tag team championship to be contested for in WWE, at the time known as the World Wide Wrestling Federation (WWWF). It was originally established in 1958 for Capitol Wrestling Corporation (CWC) as a version of the NWA United States Tag Team Championship and the inaugural champions were Mark Lewin and Don Curtis. When CWC seceded from the National Wrestling Alliance (NWA) in 1963 and became the WWWF, the championship subsequently became the WWWF United States Tag Team Championship. In 1967, WWWF World Heavyweight Champion Bruno Sammartino teamed with Spiros Arion to win the belts. Due to Sammartino being the world champion, the team vacated the tag titles which were then abandoned.

==== WWF International Tag Team Championship (1969–1971, 1985) ====
The WWF International Tag Team Championship was the second men's tag team title to be contested in the company. For the two years following the abandonment of the WWWF United States Tag Team Championship, the WWWF had no tag team title until The Rising Suns (Toru Tanaka and Mitsu Arakawa) arrived in the promotion in September 1969 with the WWWF International Tag Team Championship, which they claimed to have won in a tournament in Tokyo, Japan in June of that year. This became the WWWF's tag team title until 1971, mostly being held by The Mongols (Bepo Mongol and Geeto Mongol). When they left the WWWF in 1971, they took the titles with them. In May 1985, six years after the company was renamed World Wrestling Federation (WWF), Tatsumi Fujinami and Kengo Kimura beat Dick Murdoch and Adrian Adonis in a tournament final in Japan for a revival of the rebranded WWF International Tag Team Championship only for the title to be abandoned again when relations between New Japan Pro-Wrestling and the WWF fell out in October that year.

==== World Tag Team Championship (1971–2010) ====
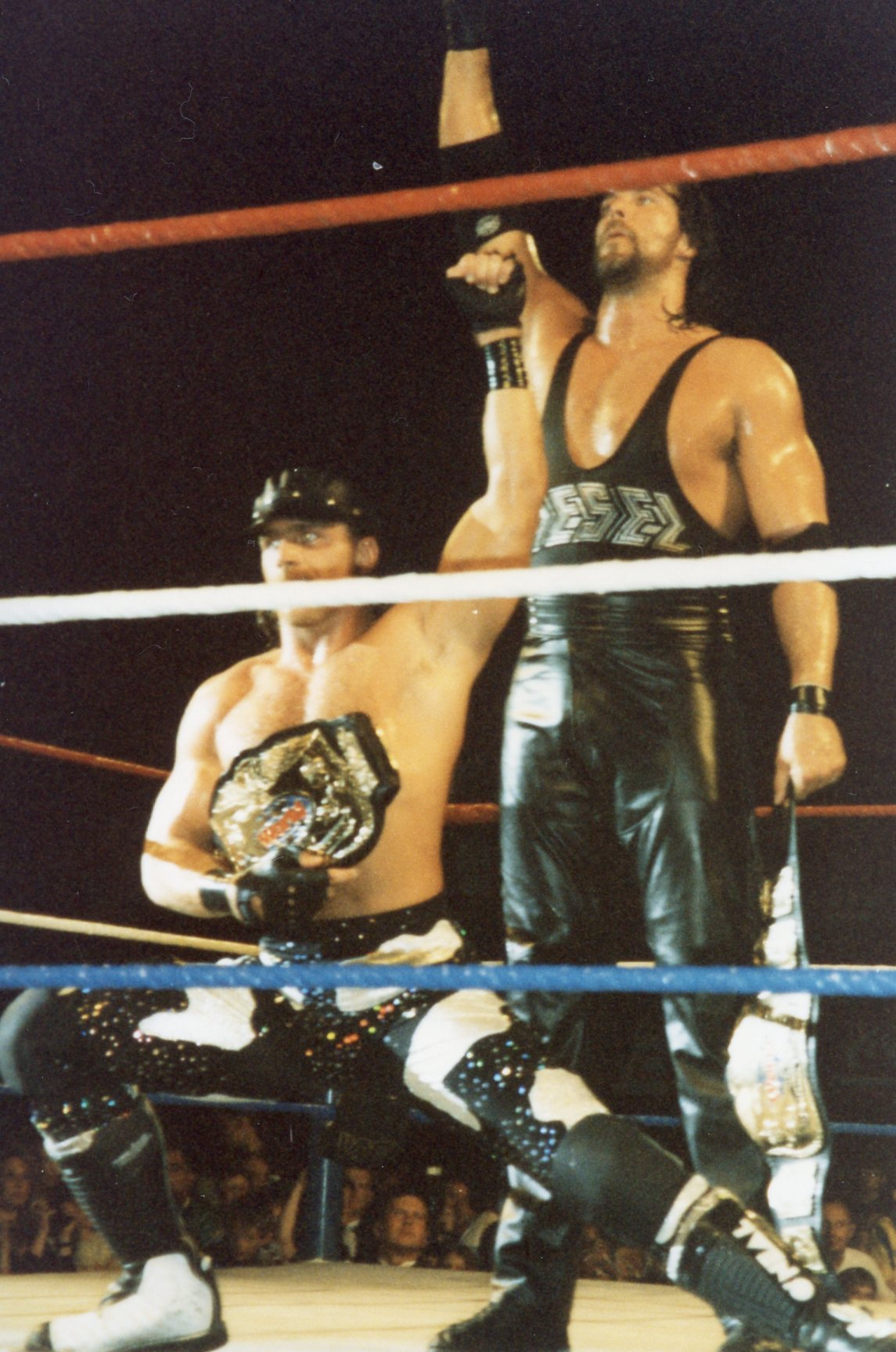
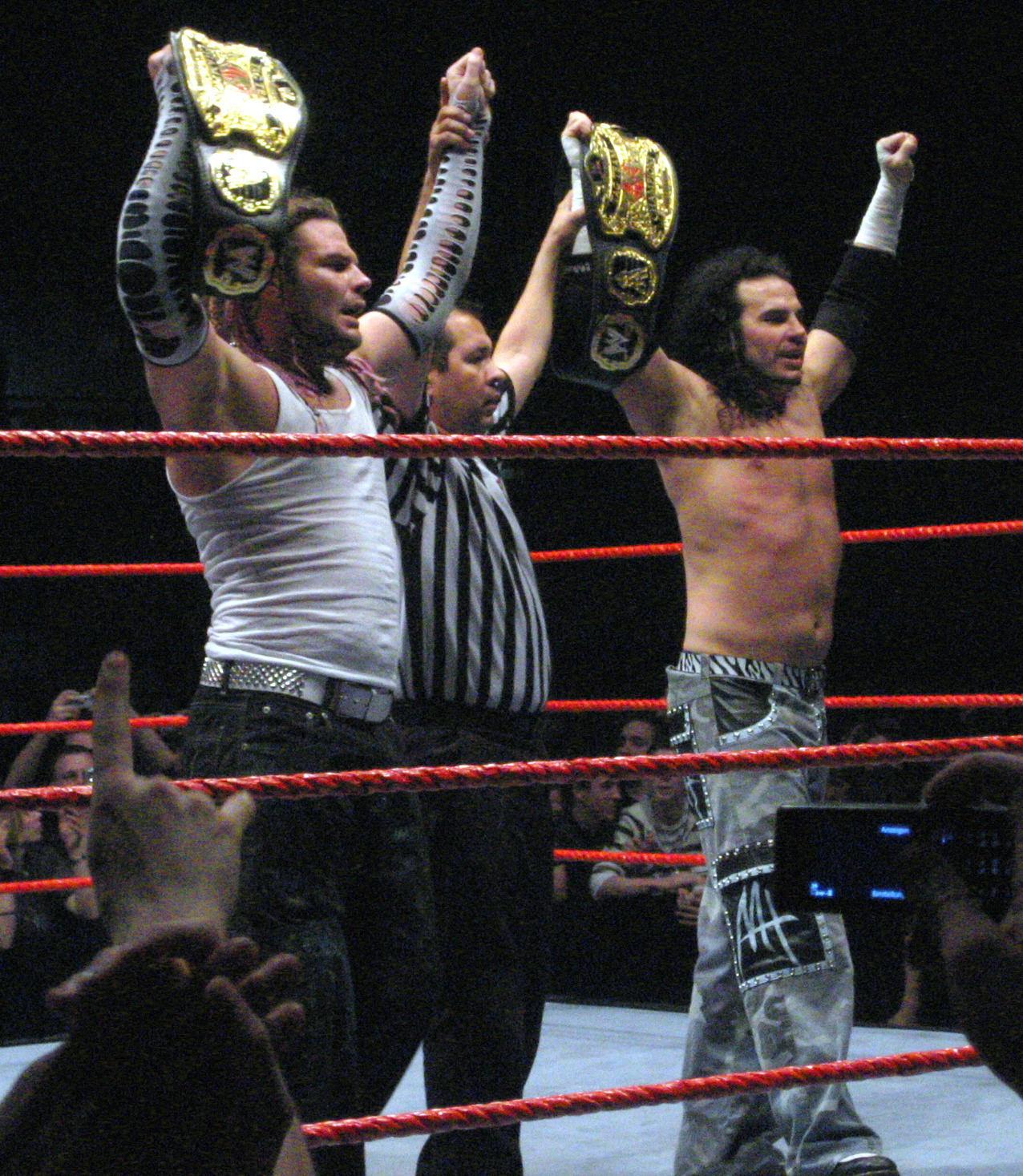
Shawn Michaels and Diesel (left) with the championship's longest-serving design during its tenure as the WWF World Tag Team Championship, and The Hardy Boyz (right) with the title's final design before its retirement as the World Tag Team Championship in 2010.

The original World Tag Team Championship was the third men's tag team title to be contested in WWE, however, it was the first world tag team championship to be established by the company. After the company lost the WWWF International Tag Team Championship, the WWWF established the WWWF World Tag Team Championship in 1971 and the inaugural champions were the team of Luke Graham and Tarzan Tyler. In 1979, the promotion became the World Wrestling Federation (WWF) and the tag titles were renamed the WWF Tag Team Championship until 1983 when they became the WWF World Tag Team Championship.

After WWF's initial brand extension in the spring of 2002 and the renaming of the company as World Wrestling Entertainment (WWE), the tag titles became the WWE Tag Team Championship and champions Billy and Chuck were drafted to the SmackDown brand. That summer, however, The Un-Americans (Christian and Lance Storm) would win the championship and shortly thereafter transfer it to the Raw brand where it was later renamed the World Tag Team Championship. SmackDown subsequently established their own WWE Tag Team Championship. After several years, in April 2009, the titles would be unified as the Unified WWE Tag Team Championship, but both titles remained independently active. The champions defended the unified title across all brands until the World Tag Team Championship was formally decommissioned in August 2010 in favor of continuing the lineage of the newer WWE Tag Team Championship, which dropped the "unified" moniker. The final World Tag Team Champions were The Hart Dynasty (Tyson Kidd and David Hart Smith), who continued on as the WWE Tag Team Champions.

==== WWF Intercontinental Tag Team Championship (1991) ====
The WWF Intercontinental Tag Team Championship was the fifth men's tag team title under the company's banner, but it was contested in the WWF-affiliated promotion UWF Japan. By 1988, wrestling magazine Pro Wrestling Illustrated was calling for the establishment of a secondary tag team championship (modelled on the WCW United States Tag Team Championship) due to the glut of tag team competition in the promotion. This never took place, but in 1991, UWF Japan introduced the WWF Intercontinental Tag Team Championship, claimed by the team of Perro Aguayo and Gran Hamada. This title was abandoned when the affiliation ended later that same year, with Aguayo and Hamada as the only title holders.

==== WCW World Tag Team Championship (1975–2001) ====
The WCW World Tag Team Championship was established in 1975, originally contested under the NWA banner, then later, World Championship Wrestling (WCW), and finally, the WWF. The title was originally a version of the NWA World Tag Team Championship for Mid-Atlantic Championship Wrestling, run by Jim Crockett Promotions of the NWA. The Minnesota Wrecking Crew (Gene Anderson and Ole Anderson) were the inaugural champions. It then became the world tag team championship of WCW when the promotion seceded from the NWA in 1991. In March 2001, the WWF bought rival company WCW, acquiring the WCW World Tag Team Championship, among other titles. It was subsequently defended on WWF programming—the fifth overall men's tag team title contested in the company—until Survivor Series in November that year. At the event, reigning WCW Tag Team Champions The Dudley Boyz (Bubba Ray Dudley and D-Von Dudley) defeated reigning WWF Tag Team Champions The Hardy Boyz (Jeff Hardy and Matt Hardy) to unify the titles, retiring WCW's title in the process.

==== World Tag Team Championship (2002–present) ====
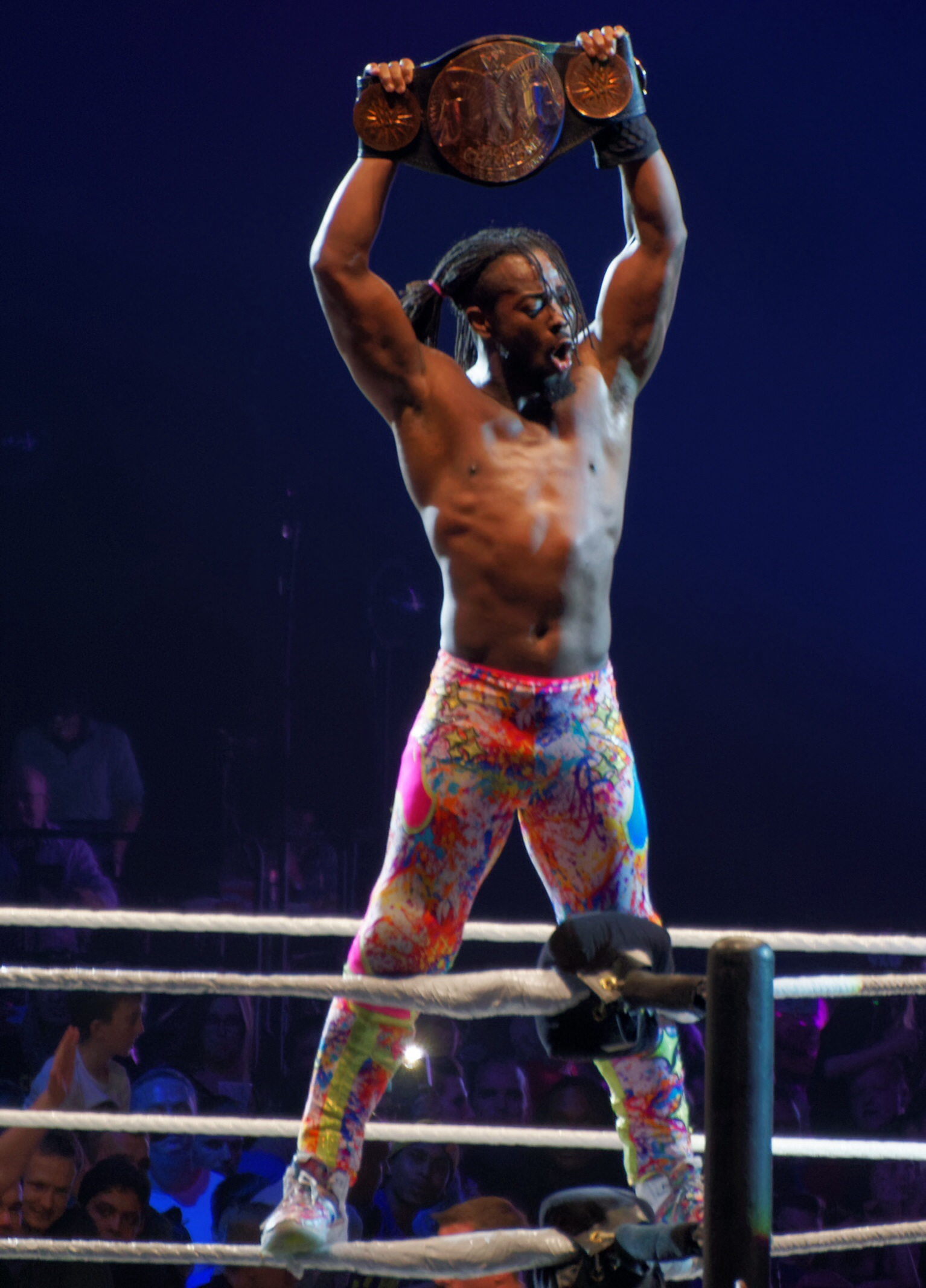
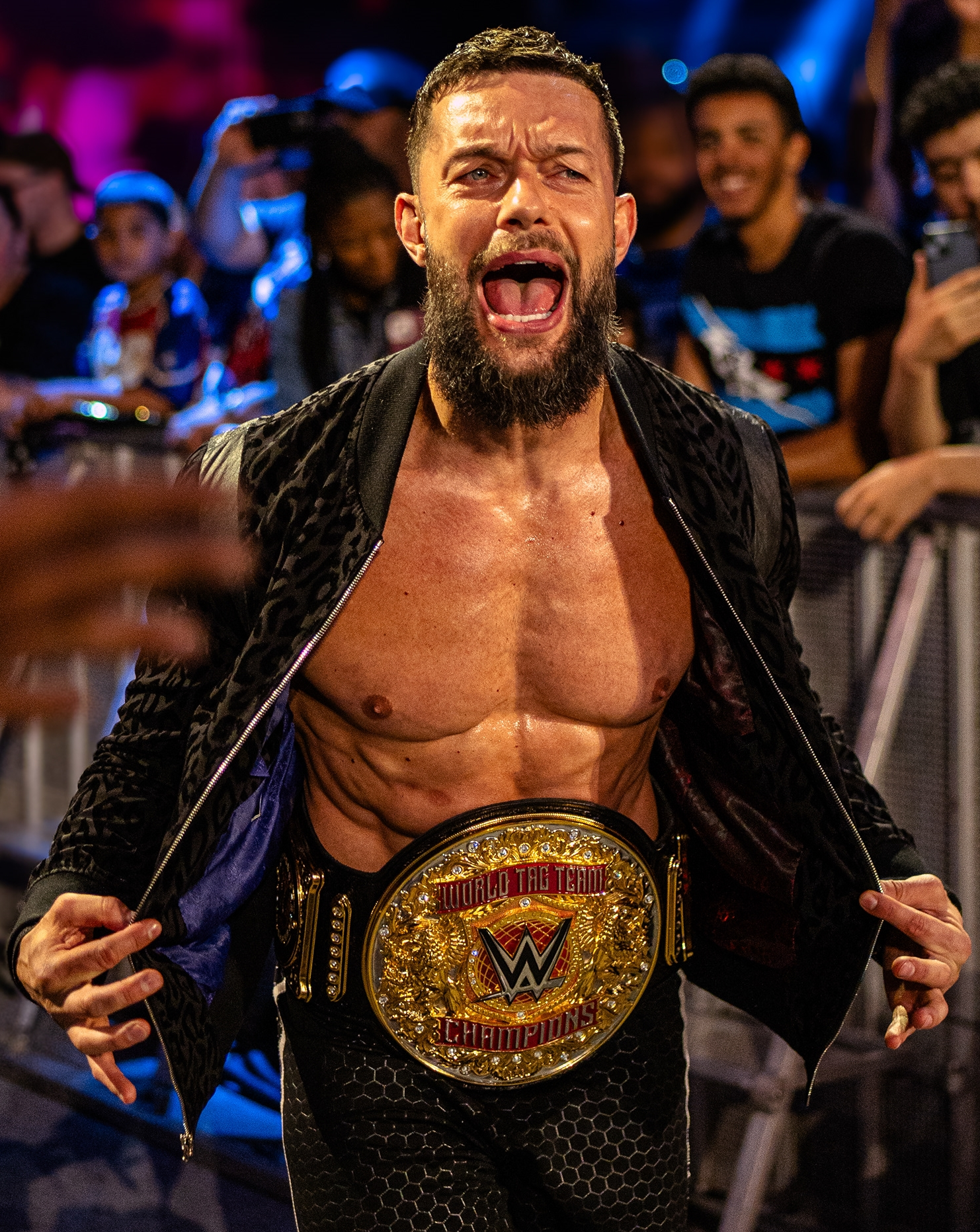
The championship's former WWE Tag Team Championship design, held by record 7-time champion Kofi Kingston (left), and its current World Tag Team Championship design, held by Finn Bálor (right).

The current World Tag Team Championship was established in 2002 and is one of WWE's two currently active world tag team championships for the main roster, defended on the Raw brand. It was originally established as the WWE Tag Team Championship, being the sixth overall men's tag team title contested in the company, but the second world tag team championship established by WWE. As a result of the original World Tag Team Championship becoming exclusive to Raw in the 2002 brand extension, then-SmackDown general manager Stephanie McMahon introduced the WWE Tag Team Championship and commissioned it to be the tag team title for the SmackDown brand. The inaugural champions were Kurt Angle and Chris Benoit.

After several years, in April 2009, the WWE Tag Team Championship and World Tag Team Championship were unified as the Unified WWE Tag Team Championship, but both titles remained independently active. The champions defended the unified title across all brands until the World Tag Team Championship was formally decommissioned in August 2010 in favor of continuing the lineage of the WWE Tag Team Championship, which dropped the "unified" moniker. The first brand extension then ended in August 2011.

With the reintroduction of the brand extension in July 2016 and the subsequent draft that month, the championship became exclusive to Raw and was renamed the Raw Tag Team Championship, and SmackDown created the SmackDown Tag Team Championship as its counterpart title. From May 2022 to April 2024, the title was held and defended together with the SmackDown Tag Team Championship as the Undisputed WWE Tag Team Championship, and both titles remained independently active. With the separation of the Undisputed WWE Tag Team Championship, the Raw Tag Team Championship was renamed as the World Tag Team Championship on April 15, 2024, followed by the SmackDown title becoming the WWE Tag Team Championship.

==== Unified WWE Tag Team Championship (2009–2010) ====
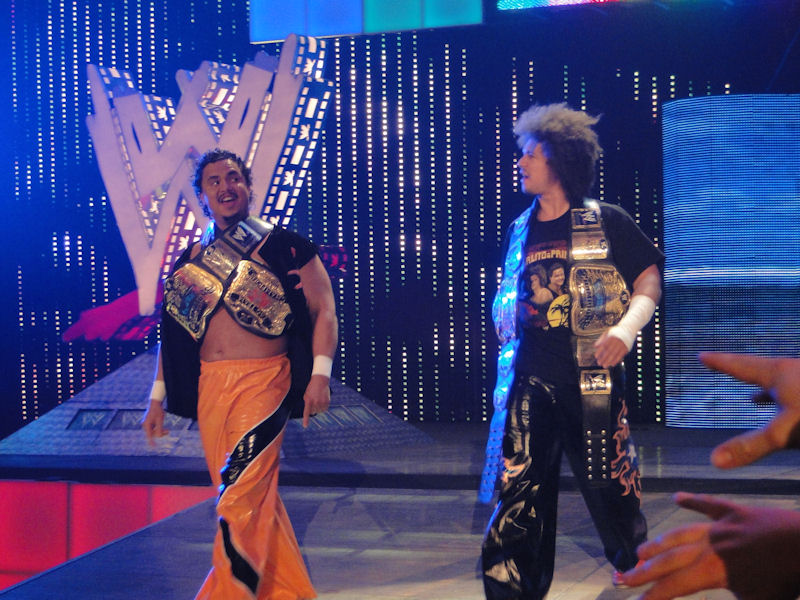
The Colóns (Primo and Carlito), who unified the World Tag Team Championship and WWE Tag Team Championship as the Unified WWE Tag Team Championship

The Unified WWE Tag Team Championship was the term used in WWE to refer to both the original World Tag Team Championship and previous WWE Tag Team Championship being held and defended together by the same team, but both titles were independently active. The titles were held together under the "unified" banner from April 2009 to August 2010, with a total of six teams holding the titles during this time, with one individual, Chris Jericho, holding them twice as he held the unified title with two different teams. The holders of the Unified WWE Tag Team Championship appeared and defended the titles across all three brands at the time: Raw, SmackDown, and ECW—the latter of which was established in May 2006 but disbanded in February 2010.

At WrestleMania 25 in April 2009, reigning WWE Tag Team Champions The Colóns (Carlito and Primo) defeated reigning World Tag Team Champions John Morrison and The Miz, and thus unified the titles into what became known as the Unified WWE Tag Team Championship, the umbrella term for what officially remained two active championships that were now collectively defended. The championships would be defended as the Unified WWE Tag Team Championship on any brand until August 2010. That month, the Anonymous Raw General Manager announced that the original World Tag Team Championship would be decommissioned in favor of continuing the WWE Tag Team Championship. The Hart Dynasty (Tyson Kidd and David Hart Smith) were subsequently the final team recognized as the Unified WWE Tag Team Champions. The WWE Tag Team Championship, which dropped the "unified" moniker, subsequently became the sole tag team championship in WWE, available to any brand before the first brand extension ended in August 2011.

==== NXT Tag Team Championship (2013–present) ====
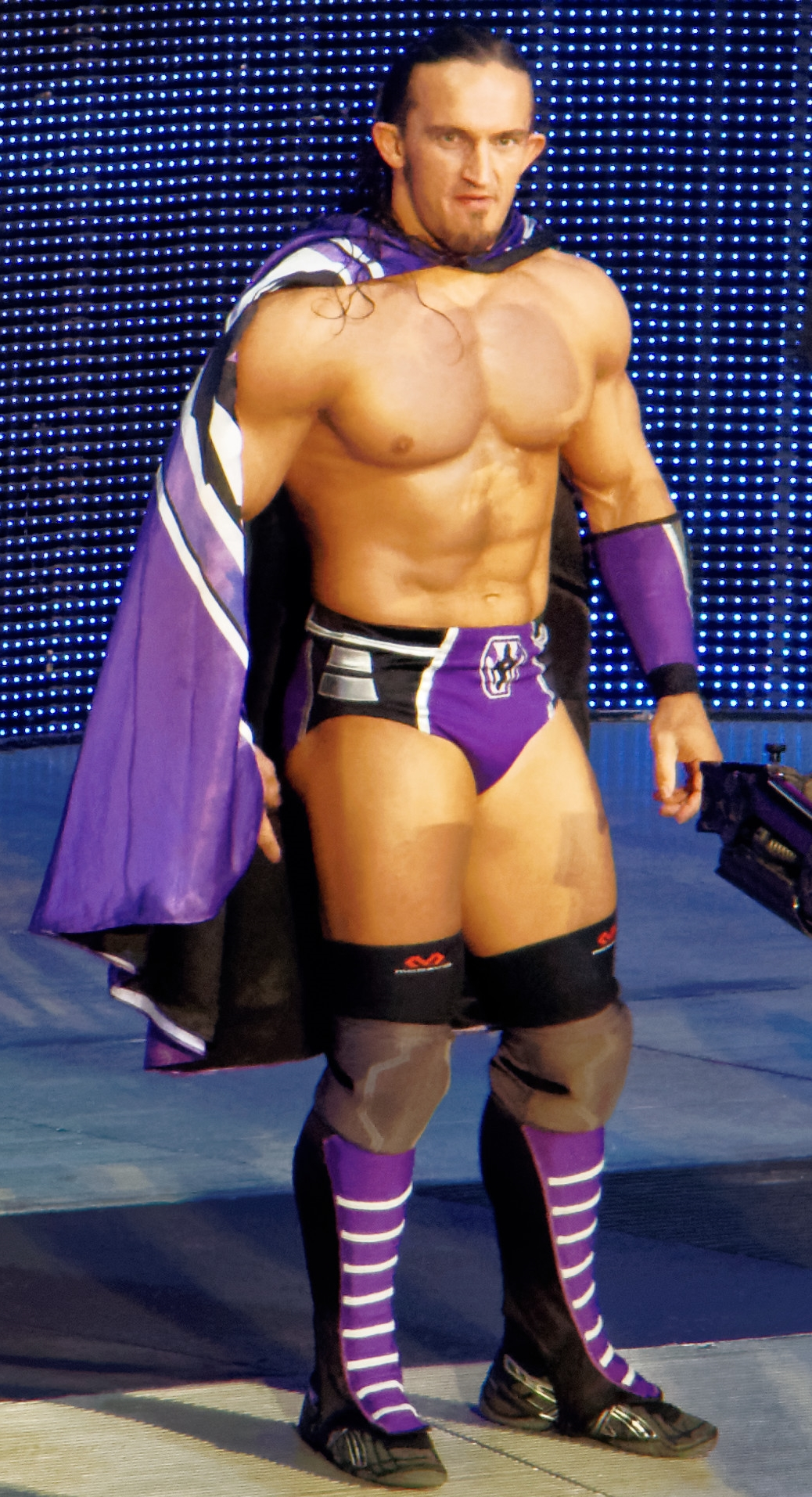
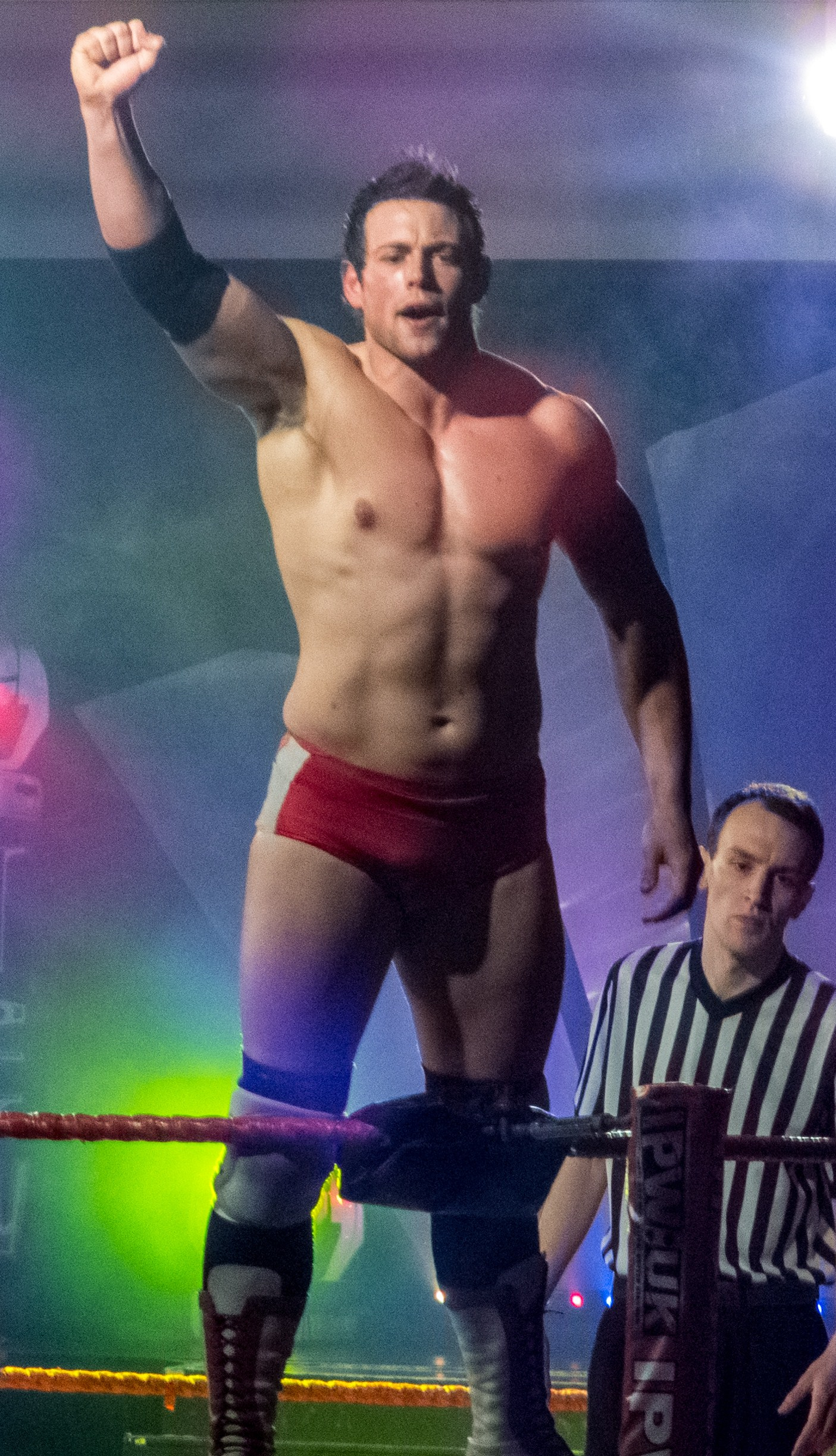
The inaugural NXT Tag Team Champions British Ambition (Adrian Neville and Oliver Grey)

The NXT Tag Team Championship is the tag team championship of WWE's developmental territory, NXT. The title was established in January 2013 and the inaugural champions were British Ambition (Adrian Neville and Oliver Grey). It is the seventh overall men's tag team title to be contested in the company. In September 2019, it became regarded as one of WWE's main titles for male tag teams when NXT became recognized as WWE's third major brand. However, NXT reverted to being WWE's developmental brand in September 2021.

==== WWE Tag Team Championship (2016–present) ====
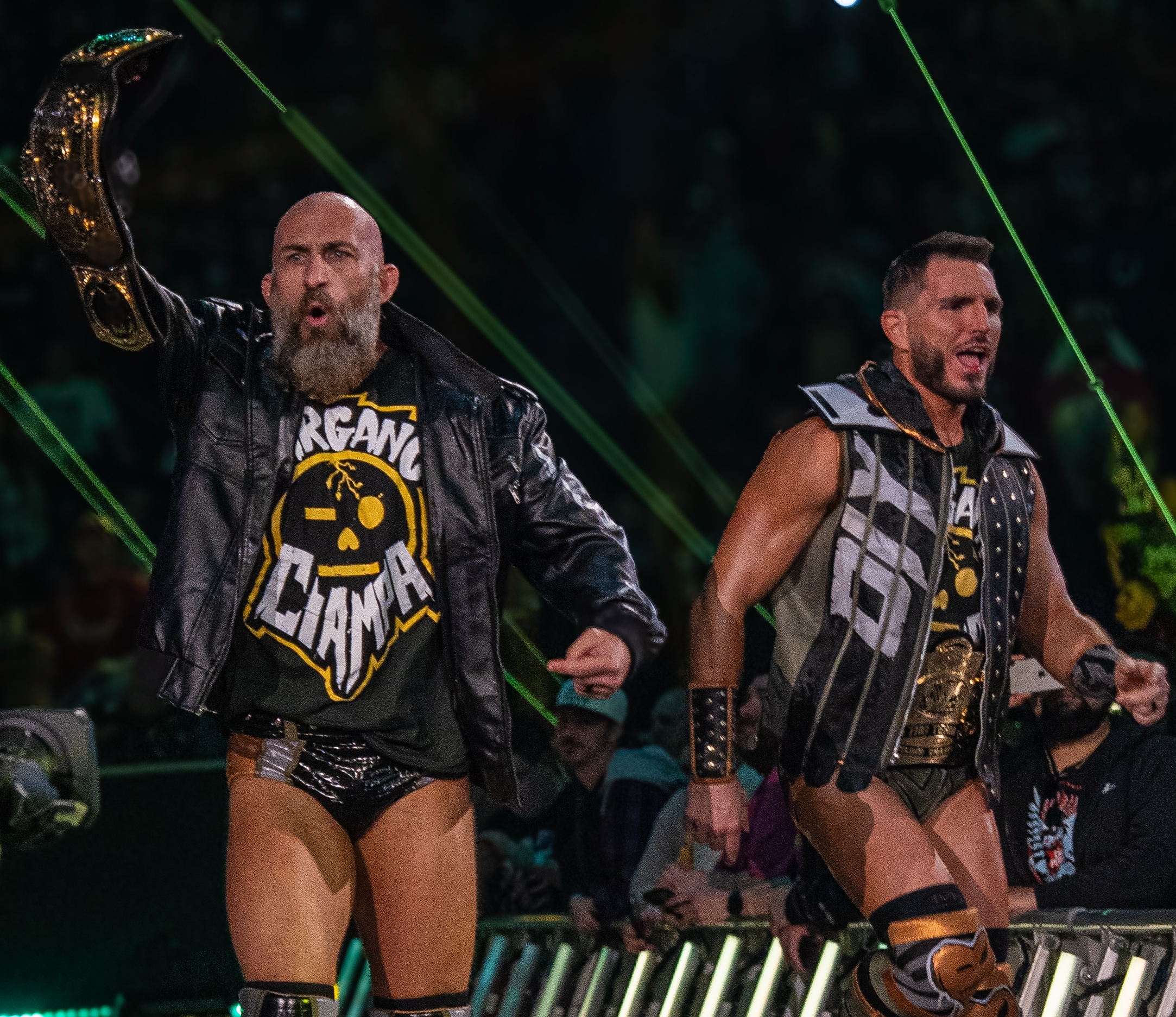
#DIY (Tommaso Ciampa (left) and Johnny Gargano (right)), with the titles after they were rebranded to the WWE Tag Team Championship

The WWE Tag Team Championship was established in 2016 and is one of WWE's two currently active world tag team championships for the main roster, representing the SmackDown brand. It is the eighth overall men's tag team title contested in the company, but the third world tag team championship established by WWE. Originally established as the SmackDown Tag Team Championship, its creation came as a result of the reintroduction of the brand extension in July 2016, when the previous WWE Tag Team Championship became exclusive to Raw and was renamed the Raw Tag Team Championship, thus SmackDown created the SmackDown Tag Team Championship as its counterpart title. Heath Slater and Rhyno were the inaugural champions. From May 2022 to April 2024, the title was held and defended together with the Raw Tag Team Championship as the Undisputed WWE Tag Team Championship, and both titles remained independently active. Shortly after the titles were split at WrestleMania XL, the Raw title became the World Tag Team Championship while the SmackDown title became the WWE Tag Team Championship.

==== NXT UK Tag Team Championship (2018–2022) ====
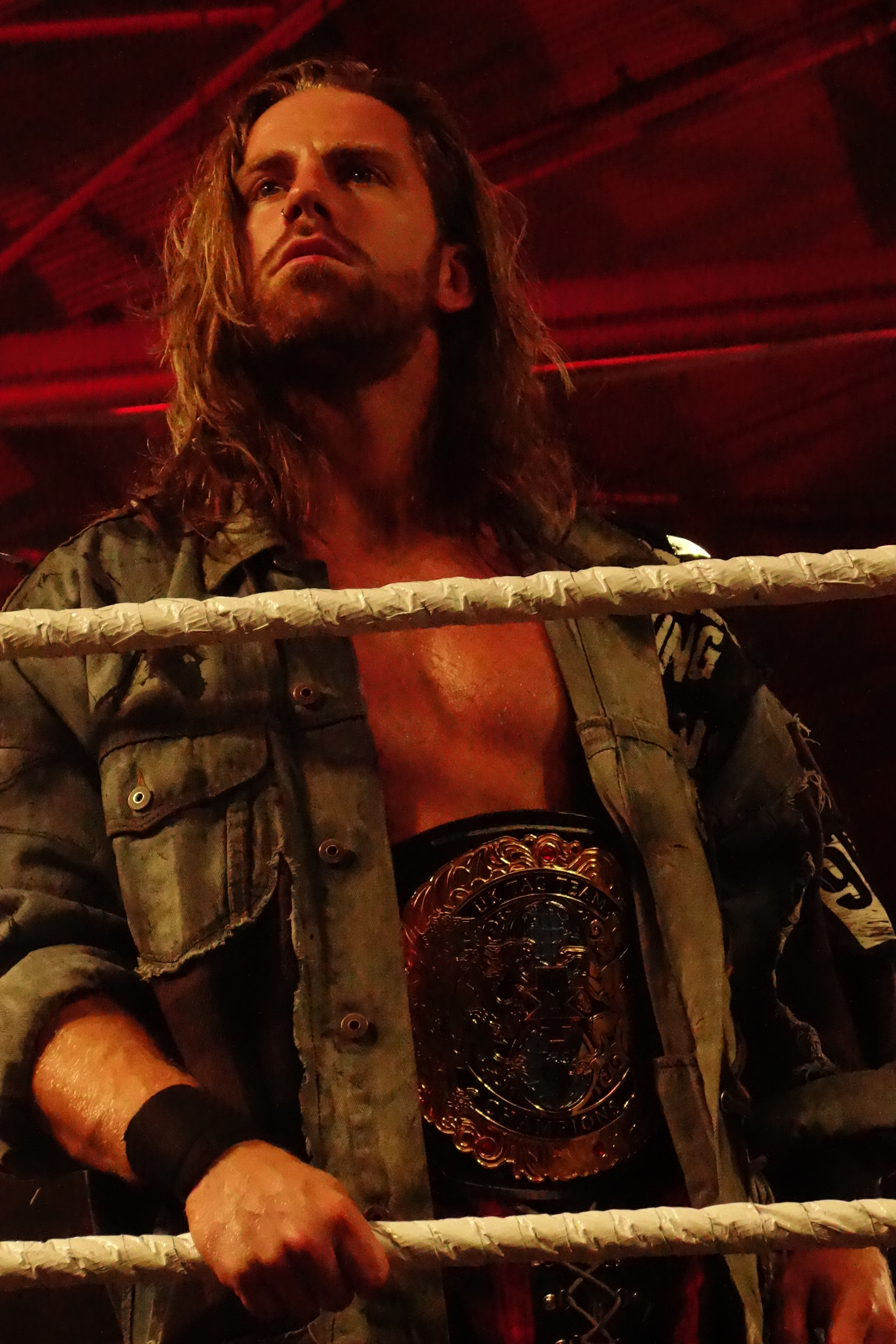
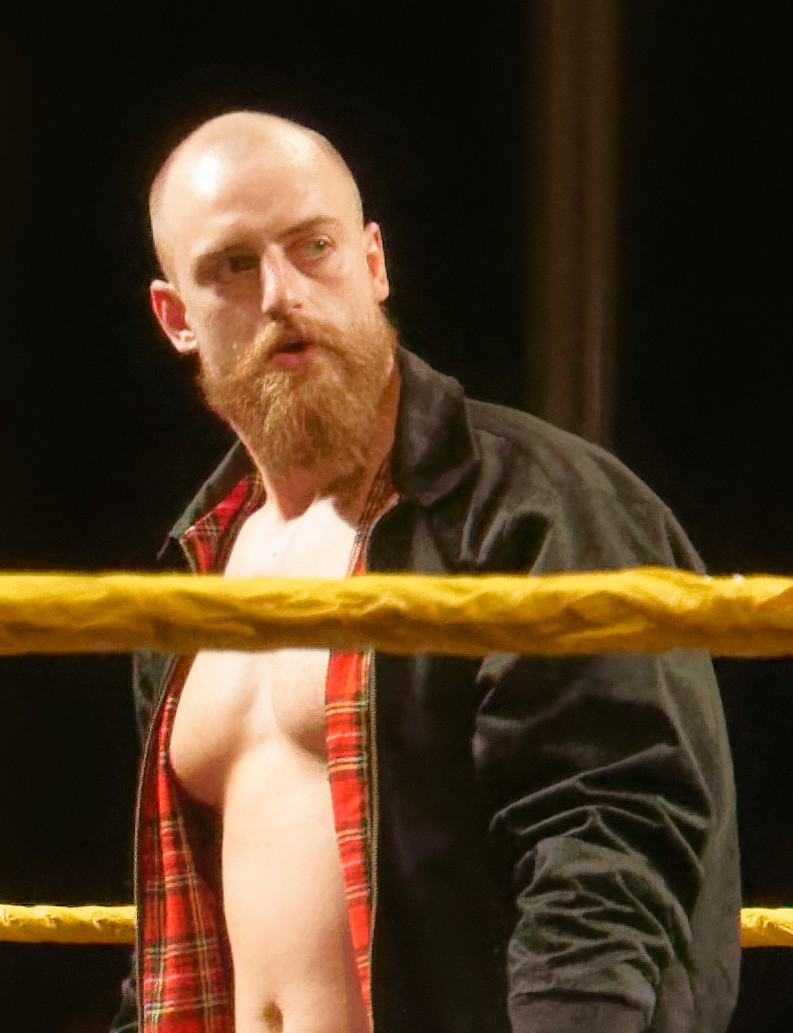
Inaugural NXT UK Tag Team Championship holders James Drake and Zack Gibson

The NXT UK Tag Team Championship was the tag team championship for the NXT UK brand, a sister brand of NXT based in the United Kingdom. It was the ninth overall men's tag team title contested in the company, and the inaugural champions were James Drake and Zack Gibson. It was established in 2018, however, after the announcement of the closure of NXT UK, the title was retired when it was unified into the NXT Tag Team Championship at Worlds Collide in September 2022. At the event, Pretty Deadly (Elton Prince and Kit Wilson) defeated Gallus (Mark Coffey and Wolfgang), reigning NXT Tag Team Champions The Creed Brothers (Brutus Creed and Julius Creed), and reigning NXT UK Tag Team Champions Brooks Jensen and Josh Briggs in a fatal four-way tag team elimination match to unify the tag team championships, with Jensen and Briggs recognized as the final NXT UK Tag Team Champions.

==== Undisputed WWE Tag Team Championship (2022–2024) ====
The Usos holding both the Raw and SmackDown tag titles, which when held together were known as the Undisputed WWE Tag Team Championship; despite maintaining their individual lineages

The Undisputed WWE Tag Team Championship was the term used in WWE to refer to both the Raw Tag Team Championship and SmackDown Tag Team Championship being held and defended together by the same team. From May 2022 to April 2024, the holders of the Undisputed WWE Tag Team Championship could appear and defend the titles on both the Raw and SmackDown brands.

On the May 20, 2022, episode of SmackDown, reigning SmackDown Tag Team Champions The Usos (Jey Uso and Jimmy Uso) defeated reigning Raw Tag Team Champions RK-Bro (Randy Orton and Riddle) in a Winners Take All match to become recognized as the Undisputed WWE Tag Team Champions. Although WWE billed the match as a unification match, both titles remained independently active. For the vast majority of title defenses between May 2022 and April 2024, the titles were defended together, but there were a couple of occasions in early 2023 where the titles were defended separately.

There were four teams that were recognized as the Undisputed WWE Tag Team Champions, with one team and three individuals recognized twice. Jey Uso held the undisputed title with two different partners, while The Judgment Day (Finn Bálor and Damian Priest) were the only team to hold the undisputed title twice. They were also the final team recognized as undisputed champions as at WrestleMania XL Night 1 on April 6, 2024, they defended the titles in a Six-Pack Tag Team Ladder match in which both sets of titles by two separate teams had to be retrieved for the match to end. The titles were subsequently split as A-Town Down Under (Austin Theory and Grayson Waller) retrieved the SmackDown titles while Awesome Truth (The Miz and R-Truth) retrieved the Raw titles.

=== Female ===
==== WWF Women's Tag Team Championship (1983–1989) ====
The WWF Women's Tag Team Championship was the company's first women's tag team championship, established in 1983. In 1983, reigning NWA Women's World Tag Team Champions Velvet McIntyre and Princess Victoria joined the WWF. As the WWF had withdrawn from the NWA, which owned the championship, McIntyre and Victoria were recognized as the first WWF Women's Tag Team Champions. The championship continued until 1989, when the promotion abandoned it due to lack of performers in the division. The Glamour Girls (Leilani Kai and Judy Martin) were the final champions.

==== WWE Women's Tag Team Championship (2018–present) ====
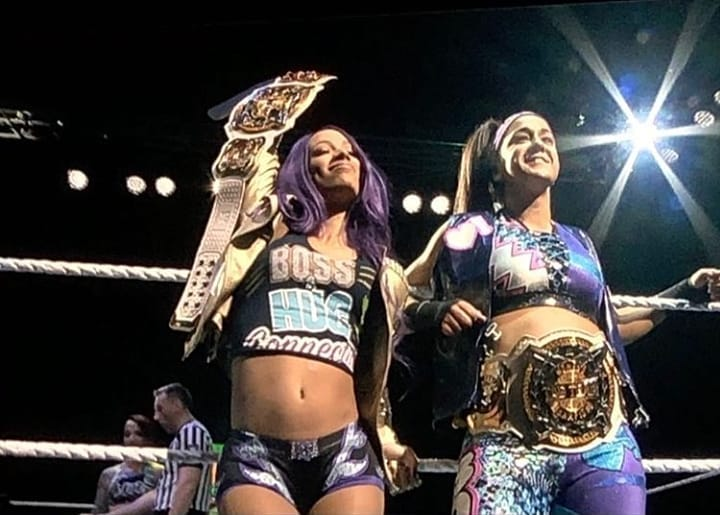
Inaugural WWE Women's Tag Team Champions The Boss 'n' Hug Connection (Sasha Banks and Bayley)

The WWE Women's Tag Team Championship was introduced on the December 24, 2018.

December 24, 2018, episode of Raw and is the only women's tag team championship in WWE, shared by the Raw, SmackDown, and NXT brands. After three decades of not having a women's tag team championship and with large support from fans and female wrestlers alike, the WWE Women's Tag Team Championship was established and then debuted in 2019. The Boss 'n' Hug Connection (Bayley and Sasha Banks) became the inaugural champions at Elimination Chamber in February. The title was originally established to be defended across the Raw, SmackDown, and NXT brands. However, in March 2021, after a dispute over the title, the NXT Women's Tag Team Championship was established, thus the WWE Women's Tag Team Championship became no longer available to NXT. On the June 23, 2023, episode of SmackDown, reigning WWE Women's Tag Team Champions Ronda Rousey and Shayna Baszler defeated the reigning NXT Women's Tag Team Champions Alba Fyre and Isla Dawn in a unification match where the NXT title was unified into the WWE title, retiring the NXT title and subsequently making the WWE Women's Tag Team Championship available to NXT again.

==== NXT Women's Tag Team Championship (2021–2023) ====
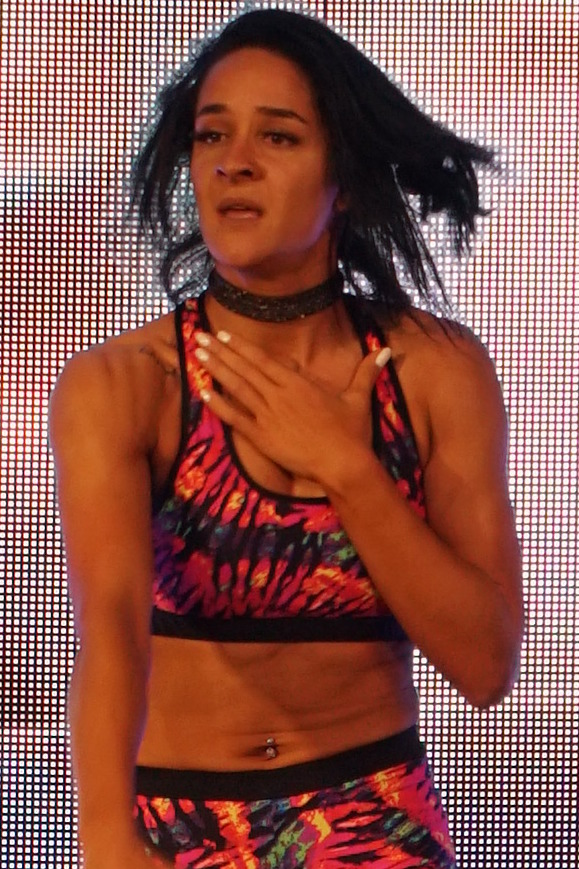
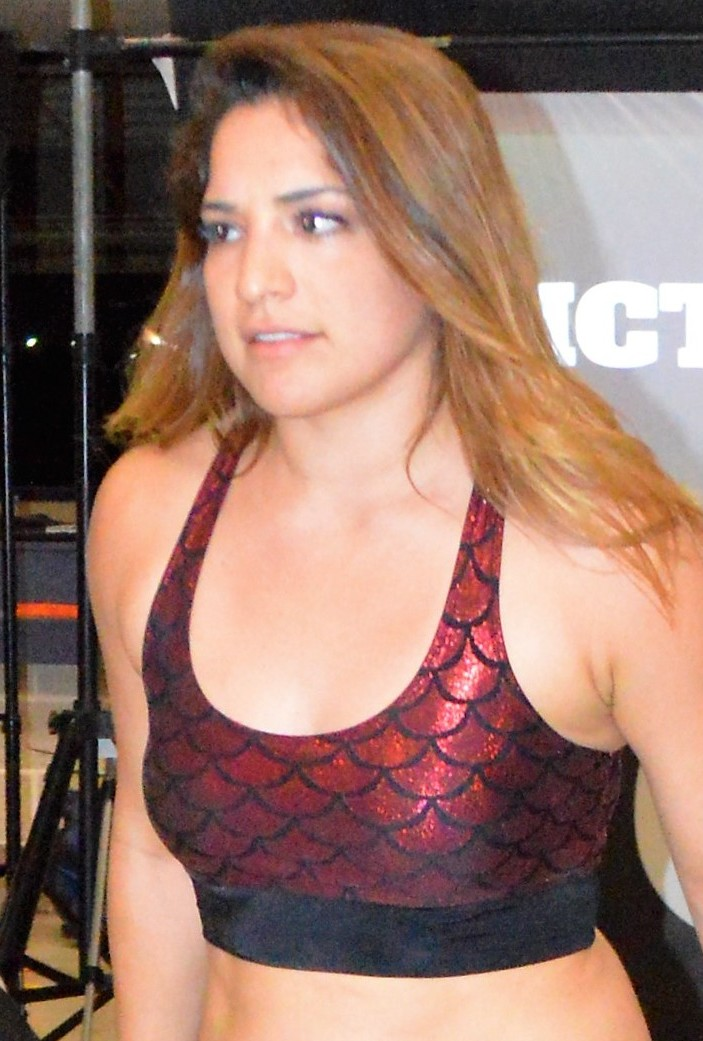
Inaugural NXT Women's Tag Team Champions Dakota Kai and Raquel González.

The NXT Women's Tag Team Championship was the women's tag team championship of WWE's developmental brand NXT. The title was established on the March 10, 2021, episode of NXT, where NXT General Manager William Regal unveiled the championship, naming Dakota Kai and Raquel González as the first champions, due to the controversial ending of their match for the WWE Women's Tag Team Championship the week prior and their having won the first Women's Dusty Rhodes Tag Team Classic. It would be a short-lived championship, as two years later on the June 23, 2023, episode of SmackDown, reigning WWE Women's Tag Team Champions Ronda Rousey and Shayna Baszler defeated reigning NXT Women's Tag Team Champions Alba Fyre and Isla Dawn in a unification match where the NXT title was unified into the WWE title, subsequently retiring the NXT title with Fyre and Dawn recognized as the final champions.

== Champions ==
=== Current champions ===
The following list shows the wrestlers that are currently holding all active tag team championships in WWE.

==== Male ====
Championship	Champion	Team Reign (indiv. reign)	Date won	Days held	Location	Notes
World championships
World Tag Team Championship (current version)	Penta and Je'Von Evans	1	November 7, 2026	9+	Riyadh, Saudi Arabia	Defeated The Vision (Bron Breakker and Austin Theory) at Crown Jewel.
WWE Tag Team Championship	The MFTs (Tama Tonga and Talla Tonga)	1 (3, 1)	August 14, 2026	94+	Boston, Massachusetts	Defeated previous champions Damian Priest and R-Truth and The War Raiders (Erik and Ivar) in a triple threat tag team match on SmackDown.
Developmental championships
NXT Tag Team Championship	The Vanity Project (Brad Baylor and Ricky Smokes)	2	August 30, 2026	78+	Edinburg, Texas	Defeated Myles Borne and Tavion Heights at Heatwave.

==== Female ====
Championship	Champion	Team Reign (indiv. reign)	Date won	Days held	Location	Notes
WWE Women's Tag Team Championship	Michin and B-Fab	1	October 23, 2026	24+	Ontario, California	Defeated Alexa Bliss and Tatum Paxley on SmackDown.

=== Retired championships ===
The following list shows retired tag team championships and the final title holders before the belts were deactivated in WWE.

Championship	Champion	Team Reign (indiv. reign)	Date retired	Days held	Notes
Men
WWWF United States Tag Team Championship	Bruno Sammartino and Spiros Arion	1 (1, 1)	July 29, 1967	5	The title was vacated and abandoned due to Sammartino being the then-WWWF World Heavyweight Champion.
WWF International Tag Team Championship	Kengo Kimura and Tatsumi Fujinami	1 (1, 1)	October 31, 1985	159	The championship was abandoned when New Japan Pro-Wrestling ended its partnership with the WWF.
WWF Intercontinental Tag Team Championship	Perro Aguayo and Gran Hamada	1 (1, 1)	July 1991	Undeterminable	The championship was abandoned when UWF Japan ended its affiliation with the WWF. The exact date is unknown.
WCW World Tag Team Championship	The Dudley Boyz (Bubba Ray Dudley and D-Von Dudley)	1 (1, 1)	November 18, 2001	26	The championship was unified into the then-WWF Tag Team Championship.
World Tag Team Championship (original version)	The Hart Dynasty (David Hart Smith and Tyson Kidd)	1 (1, 1)	August 16, 2010	112	Won together with the then-WWE Tag Team Championship as the Unified WWE Tag Team Championship. The original World Tag Team Championship was retired in favor of continuing the lineage of the WWE Tag Team Championship, which dropped the "unified" moniker.
Men's Developmental
NXT UK Tag Team Championship	Brooks Jensen and Josh Briggs	1 (1, 1)	September 4, 2022	74	The championship was unified into the NXT Tag Team Championship.
Women
WWF Women's Tag Team Championship	The Glamour Girls (Judy Martin and Leilani Kai)	2 (2, 2)	February 14, 1989	251	The championship was abandoned due to a lack of women's tag teams in the division.
Women's Developmental
NXT Women's Tag Team Championship	Alba Fyre and Isla Dawn	1 (1, 1)	June 23, 2023	83	The championship was unified into the WWE Women's Tag Team Championship.

=== Inaugural championship holders ===
The following lists shows the inaugural holders for each tag championship created and/or promoted by WWE.

Championship	Holder(s)	Date	Notes
Men
WWWF United States Tag Team Championship	Mark Lewin and Don Curtis	July 1, 1958	Won the title as a version of the NWA United States Tag Team Championship of Capitol Wrestling Corporation of the National Wrestling Alliance (NWA).
WWF International Tag Team Championship	The Rising Suns (Toru Tanaka and Mitsu Arakawa)	July 1, 1969	Won the title as the WWWF International Tag Team Championship.
World Tag Team Championship (original version)	Luke Graham and Tarzan Tyler	June 3, 1971	Won the title as the WWWF World Tag Team Championship.
WCW World Tag Team Championship	Minnesota Wrecking Crew (Gene Anderson and Ole Anderson)	January 29, 1975	Won the title as a version of the NWA World Tag Team Championship of Mid-Atlantic Championship Wrestling, run by Jim Crockett Promotions of the National Wrestling Alliance (NWA).
WWF Intercontinental Tag Team Championship	Perro Aguayo and Gran Hamada	January 7, 1991	They were the only holders of the championship as the title was abandoned sometime in July 1991.
World Tag Team Championship (current version)	Kurt Angle and Chris Benoit	October 20, 2002	Won the title as the WWE Tag Team Championship.
NXT Tag Team Championship	British Ambition (Adrian Neville and Oliver Grey)	January 31, 2013	WWE officially recognizes that British Ambition won the title on February 13, 2013, when the match aired on tape delay.
WWE Tag Team Championship	Heath Slater and Rhyno	September 11, 2016	Won the title as the SmackDown Tag Team Championship.
NXT UK Tag Team Championship	James Drake and Zack Gibson	January 12, 2019	
Women
WWF Women's Tag Team Championship	Princess Victoria and Velvet McIntyre	May 13, 1983	They were the reigning NWA World Women's Tag Team Champions of the National Wrestling Alliance (NWA), but became the inaugural WWF Women's Tag Team Champions upon joining the WWF.
WWE Women's Tag Team Championship	The Boss 'n' Hug Connection (Bayley and Sasha Banks)	February 17, 2019	
NXT Women's Tag Team Championship	Dakota Kai and Raquel González	March 10, 2021	

== Longest championship reigns ==
=== Male ===
==== Top 10 tag team championship reigns ====
The following list shows the top 10 tag team championship reigns in WWE history.

No.	Team	Title	Reign	Length (days)	Notes
1	The Usos (Jey Uso and Jimmy Uso)	WWE Tag Team Championship	5	622	During this reign, the title was known as the SmackDown Tag Team Championship. After The Usos won the Raw Tag Team Championship on May 20, 2022, both titles together became known as the Undisputed WWE Tag Team Championship.
2	Gallus (Mark Coffey and Wolfgang)	NXT UK Tag Team Championship	1	497	The actual length of their reign is undeterminable as the real date they lost the title is unknown, but WWE recognizes the reign as lasting 497 days.
3	The New Day (Big E, Kofi Kingston, and Xavier Woods)	World Tag Team Championship (current version)	2	483	They won the title as the WWE Tag Team Championship, but midway through this reign, it was renamed to Raw Tag Team Championship following the reintroduction of the WWE brand extension when the title became exclusive to Raw. All three members were recognized as champions under the Freebird Rule.
4	Demolition (Ax and Smash)	World Tag Team Championship (original version)	1	478	During this reign, the title was known as the WWF World Tag Team Championship.
5	The Fabulous Kangaroos (Al Costello and Roy Heffernan)	WWWF United States Tag Team Championship	3	399	During this reign, the title was known as the NWA United States Tag Team Championship.
6	The Valiant Brothers (Jimmy Valiant and Johnny Valiant)	World Tag Team Championship (original version)	1	370	During this reign, the title was known as the WWWF World Tag Team Championship.
7	The Mongols (Bepo and Geto)	WWF International Tag Team Championship	1	368	During this reign, the title was known as the WWWF International Tag Team Championship.
8	The Ascension (Konnor and Viktor)	NXT Tag Team Championship	1	364	WWE recognizes The Ascension's reign as lasting 344 days due to tape delay.
9	Mr Fuji and Professor Tanaka	World Tag Team Championship (original version)	1	337	During this reign, the title was known as the WWWF World Tag Team Championship.
10	Paul London and Brian Kendrick	World Tag Team Championship (current version)	1	331	During this reign, the title was known as the WWE Tag Team Championship. WWE recognizes London and Kendrick's reign as lasting 334 days due to tape delay.

==== Specific record for each championship ====
The following list shows the longest reigning champion for each tag team championship created and/or promoted by WWE, with the exception of the WWF Intercontinental Tag Team Championship. The team of Perro Aguayo and Gran Hamada won the inaugural championship on January 7, 1991. The title was abandoned at an unknown date, without ever being lost to another team. The length of their reign can thus not be determined.

Titles are listed in order of creation.

Title	Champion	Reign	Dates held	Length (days)	Notes
WWWF United States Tag Team Championship	The Fabulous Kangaroos (Al Costello and Roy Heffernan)	3rd	November 28, 1960 – January 11, 1962	409	During this reign, the title was known as the NWA United States Tag Team Championship.
WWF International Tag Team Championship	The Mongols (Bepo and Geto)	1st	June 15, 1970 – June 18, 1971	368	During this reign, the title was known as the WWWF International Tag Team Championship.
World Tag Team Championship (original version)	Demolition (Ax and Smash)	1st	March 27, 1988 – July 18, 1989	478	During this reign, the title was known as the WWF World Tag Team Championship. Demolition's record-breaking 371st day as champions took place the same day as WrestleMania V
WCW World Tag Team Championship	Doom (Butch Reed and Ron Simmons)	1st	May 19, 1990 – February 24, 1991	281	The title was owned by World Championship Wrestling (WCW) at this time. Originally known as the NWA World Tag Team Championship (one of twenty versions promoted by various NWA members between 1949 and 1982) during this reign, it was renamed to WCW World Tag Team Championship due to issues between the NWA and WCW.
World Tag Team Championship (current version)	The New Day (Big E, Kofi Kingston, and Xavier Woods)	2nd	August 23, 2015 – December 18, 2016	483	The New Day won the title as the WWE Tag Team Championship, but midway through this reign, it was renamed to Raw Tag Team Championship following the reintroduction of the WWE brand extension when the title became exclusive to Raw. All three members were recognized as champion under the Freebird Rule.
NXT Tag Team Championship	The Ascension (Konnor and Viktor)	1st	September 12, 2013 – September 11, 2014	364	WWE recognizes The Ascension's reign as lasting 344 days (October 2, 2013 – September 11, 2014) due to tape delay.
WWE Tag Team Championship	The Usos (Jey Uso and Jimmy Uso)	5th	July 18, 2021 – April 1, 2023	622	During this reign, the title was known as the SmackDown Tag Team Championship. After The Usos won the Raw Tag Team Championship on May 20, 2022, both titles together became known as the Undisputed WWE Tag Team Championship.
NXT UK Tag Team Championship	Gallus (Mark Coffey and Wolfgang)	1st	October 4, 2019 – N/A	N/A	The actual length of their reign is undeterminable as the real date they lost the title is unknown, but WWE recognizes the reign as lasting 497 days (October 17, 2019 – February 25, 2021) due to tape delay for both dates.

=== Female ===
==== Top 10 tag team championship reigns ====
The following list shows the top 10 tag team championship reigns in WWE history.

No.	Champion	Title	Reign	Length (days)	Notes
1	The Glamour Girls (Judy Martin and Leilani Kai)	WWF Women's Tag Team Championship	1	906	
2	Velvet McIntyre and Princess Victoria	WWF Women's Tag Team Championship	1	574	McIntyre and Victoria were the reigning NWA Women's World Tag Team Champions upon joining the WWF and were recognized as the first WWF Women's Tag Team Champions, which ended the lineage of the National Wrestling Alliance's (NWA) title.
3	The Glamour Girls (Judy Martin and Leilani Kai)	WWF Women's Tag Team Championship	2	251	
4	Velvet McIntyre and Desiree Petersen	WWF Women's Tag Team Championship	1	237	
5	Katana Chance and Kayden Carter	NXT Women's Tag Team Championship	1	186	
6	The Kabuki Warriors (Asuka and Kairi Sane)	WWE Women's Tag Team Championship	1	172	The event that they lost the title was taped across two days, and it is currently not known which date they lost the titles. WWE recognizes The Kabuki Warriors' reign as lasting 181 days due to tape delay.
7	Toxic Attraction (Gigi Dolin and Jacy Jayne)	NXT Women's Tag Team Championship	1	158	
8	The Jumping Bomb Angels (Itsuki Yamazaki and Noriyo Tateno)	WWF Women's Tag Team Championship	1	136	
9	Carmella and Queen Zelina	WWE Women's Tag Team Championship	1	132	
10	Natalya and Tamina	WWE Women's Tag Team Championship	1	129	

==== Specific record for each championship ====
The following list shows the longest reigning champion for each tag team championship created and/or promoted by WWE.

Titles are listed in order of creation.

No.	Champion	Title	Reign	Dates held	Length (days)	Notes
1	The Glamour Girls (Judy Martin and Leilani Kai)	WWF Women's Tag Team Championship	1	August 1, 1985 – January 24, 1988	906	
2	The Kabuki Warriors (Asuka and Kairi Sane)	WWE Women's Tag Team Championship	1	October 6, 2019 – March 25 or 26, 2020	172 or 171	The event that they lost the title was taped across two days, and it is not known which date they lost the title. WWE recognizes The Kabuki Warriors' reign as lasting 181 days (October 6, 2019 – April 4, 2020) due to tape delay.
3	Kayden Carter and Katana Chance	NXT Women's Tag Team Championship	1	August 2, 2022 – February 4, 2023	186	

== Most championship reigns ==
=== Male ===
The following lists shows the wrestlers with the most reigns for each tag team championship created and/or promoted by WWE.

==== By team ====
No.	Champion	Championship	No. of Reigns	Notes
1	Harlem Heat (Booker T and Stevie Ray)	WCW World Tag Team Championship	10	
2	The Dudley Boyz (Bubba Ray Dudley and D-Von Dudley)	World Tag Team Championship (original version)	8	During their first six reigns, the title was known as the WWF Tag Team Championship.
3	The New Day (Kofi Kingston and Xavier Woods)	WWE Tag Team Championship	7	During all seven reigns, the title was known as the SmackDown Tag Team Championship. For the first six reigns, Big E also defended the title, as all three members of New Day were recognized as champion under the Freebird Rule; Big E was split from the team as a result of the 2020 WWE Draft, and thus was not part of the seventh reign.
4	The New Day (Kofi Kingston and Xavier Woods)	World Tag Team Championship (current version)	5	During their first reign, the title was known as the WWE Tag Team Championship, but midway through their second reign, it was renamed to Raw Tag Team Championship following the reintroduction of the WWE brand extension when the title became exclusive to Raw. During their first two reigns, Big E also defended the title, as all three members of New Day were recognized as champion under the Freebird Rule; Big E was split from the team as a result of the 2020 WWE Draft, and thus was not part of the third and fourth reigns.
5	The Grahams (Jerry and Eddie)	WWWF United States Tag Team Championship	4	During all four of their reigns, the title was known as the NWA United States Tag Team Championship.
6	The Undisputed Era	NXT Tag Team Championship	3	During their first reign, Adam Cole, Bobby Fish, Kyle O'Reilly, and Roderick Strong were all recognized as champion under the Freebird Rule. During their second reign, only O'Reilly and Strong were recognized as champions, while during their third reign, only Fish and O'Reilly were recognized as champions.
7	The Mongols (Bepo and Geto)	WWF International Tag Team Championship	2	During both reigns, the title was known as the WWWF International Tag Team Championship.
8	James Drake and Zack Gibson	NXT UK Tag Team Championship	1	There were only seven reigns between seven teams during the title's four-year existence.
8	Flash Morgan Webster and Mark Andrews	NXT UK Tag Team Championship	1	There were only seven reigns between seven teams during the title's four-year existence.
8	Gallus (Mark Coffey and Wolfgang)	NXT UK Tag Team Championship	1	There were only seven reigns between seven teams during the title's four-year existence.
8	Pretty Deadly (Lewis Howley and Sam Stoker)	NXT UK Tag Team Championship	1	There were only seven reigns between seven teams during the title's four-year existence.
8	Moustache Mountain (Trent Seven and Tyler Bate)	NXT UK Tag Team Championship	1	There were only seven reigns between seven teams during the title's four-year existence.
8	Ashton Smith and Oliver Carter	NXT UK Tag Team Championship	1	There were only seven reigns between seven teams during the title's four-year existence.
8	Brooks Jensen and Josh Briggs	NXT UK Tag Team Championship	1	There were only seven reigns between seven teams during the title's four-year existence.
9	Perro Aguayo and Gran Hamada	WWF Intercontinental Tag Team Championship	1	This was the only reign for the title.

==== By wrestler ====
No.	Champion	Championship	No. of Reigns	Notes
1	Edge	World Tag Team Championship (original version)	12	During his first seven reigns, the title was known as the WWF Tag Team Championship. During his eighth reign, the title was known as the WWE Tag Team Championship. During his following four reigns, the title was known as the World Tag Team Championship. It was also simultaneously known as the Unified WWE Tag Team Championship during his 12th reign.
2	Booker T	WCW World Tag Team Championship	11	
3	Kofi Kingston	WWE Tag Team Championship	7	During all seven reigns, the title was known as the SmackDown Tag Team Championship. For the first six reigns, the two were part of a trio with Big E called The New Day and all three were recognized as champion under the Freebird Rule; Big E was split from the team as a result of the 2020 WWE Draft and was thus not recognized as champion for the seventh reign.
3	Xavier Woods	WWE Tag Team Championship	7	During all seven reigns, the title was known as the SmackDown Tag Team Championship. For the first six reigns, the two were part of a trio with Big E called The New Day and all three were recognized as champion under the Freebird Rule; Big E was split from the team as a result of the 2020 WWE Draft and was thus not recognized as champion for the seventh reign.
4	Kofi Kingston	World Tag Team Championship (current version)	7	During his first three reigns, the title was known as the WWE Tag Team Championship. Midway through his fourth reign, it was renamed to Raw Tag Team Championship following the reintroduction of the WWE brand extension when the title became exclusive to Raw.
5	Dr. Jerry Graham	WWWF United States Tag Team Championship	6	During his first five reigns, the title was known as the NWA United States Tag Team Championship.
5	Kyle O'Reilly	NXT Tag Team Championship	3	
6	Geto Mongol	WWF International Tag Team Championship	3	During all three of his reigns, the title was known as the WWWF International Tag Team Championship.
7	Mark Andrews	NXT UK Tag Team Championship	1	There were only six reigns between six teams composed of 12 individual champions during the title's four-year existence.
7	Trent Seven	NXT UK Tag Team Championship	1	There were only six reigns between six teams composed of 12 individual champions during the title's four-year existence.
7	Tyler Bate	NXT UK Tag Team Championship	1	There were only six reigns between six teams composed of 12 individual champions during the title's four-year existence.
7	Mark Coffey	NXT UK Tag Team Championship	1	There were only six reigns between six teams composed of 12 individual champions during the title's four-year existence.
7	James Drake	NXT UK Tag Team Championship	1	There were only six reigns between six teams composed of 12 individual champions during the title's four-year existence.
7	Zack Gibson	NXT UK Tag Team Championship	1	There were only six reigns between six teams composed of 12 individual champions during the title's four-year existence.
7	Lewis Howley	NXT UK Tag Team Championship	1	There were only six reigns between six teams composed of 12 individual champions during the title's four-year existence.
7	Sam Stoker	NXT UK Tag Team Championship	1	There were only six reigns between six teams composed of 12 individual champions during the title's four-year existence.
7	Flash Morgan Webster	NXT UK Tag Team Championship	1	There were only six reigns between six teams composed of 12 individual champions during the title's four-year existence.
7	Wolfgang	NXT UK Tag Team Championship	1	There were only six reigns between six teams composed of 12 individual champions during the title's four-year existence.
7	Brooks Jensen	NXT UK Tag Team Championship	1	There were only six reigns between six teams composed of 12 individual champions during the title's four-year existence.
7	Josh Briggs	NXT UK Tag Team Championship	1	There were only six reigns between six teams composed of 12 individual champions during the title's four-year existence.
8	Perro Aguayo	WWF Intercontinental Tag Team Championship	1	This was the only reign for the title.
8	Gran Hamada	WWF Intercontinental Tag Team Championship	1	This was the only reign for the title.

=== Female ===
The following lists shows the wrestlers with the most reigns for each tag team championship created and/or promoted by WWE.

==== By team ====
No.	Champion	Championship	No. of Reigns	Notes
1	Liv Morgan and Raquel Rodriguez	WWE Women's Tag Team Championship	4	
2	The Glamour Girls (Judy Martin and Leilani Kai)	WWF Women's Tag Team Championship	2	
3	Dakota Kai and Raquel González	NXT Women's Tag Team Championship	2	
3	Toxic Attraction (Gigi Dolin and Jacy Jayne)	NXT Women's Tag Team Championship	2	

==== By wrestler ====
No.	Champion	Championship	No. of Reigns	Notes
1	Raquel Rodriguez	WWE Women's Tag Team Championship	6	
2	Judy Martin	WWF Women's Tag Team Championship	2	
2	Leilani Kai	WWF Women's Tag Team Championship	2	
2	Velvet McIntyre	WWF Women's Tag Team Championship	2	
3	Dakota Kai	NXT Women's Tag Team Championship	2	
3	Gigi Dolin	NXT Women's Tag Team Championship	2	
3	Jacy Jayne	NXT Women's Tag Team Championship	2	
3	Raquel González	NXT Women's Tag Team Championship	2	

=== Most total reigns ===
==== Male ====
The following list shows the male wrestlers who have the most tag team championship reigns in total as individuals, combining all titles they have held as recognized by WWE. This list also shows the titles that they won to achieve this record.

No.	Champion	Titles	No. of Reigns	Notes
1	Bubba Ray Dudley	World Tag Team Championship (original version, 8 times); World Tag Team Championship (current version, 1 time); ECW World Tag Team Championship (8 times); WCW World Tag Team Championship (1 time)	18	All of their tag team championships were won together as The Dudley Boyz.; During their first six reigns with the original World Tag Team Championship, the title was known as the WWF Tag Team Championship.; During their one reign with the current World Tag Team Championship, the title was known as the WWE Tag Team Championship.; During their one reign with the WCW World Tag Team Championship, the title was known as the WCW Tag Team Championship. The Dudley Boyz were the final champions and the second of two tag teams to have held the WWF and WCW Tag Team Championships together.; Although the ECW World Tag Team Championship was never contested in WWE, the company recognizes these reigns for The Dudley Boyz's total number of tag team championships held.
1	D-Von Dudley	World Tag Team Championship (original version, 8 times); World Tag Team Championship (current version, 1 time); ECW World Tag Team Championship (8 times); WCW World Tag Team Championship (1 time)	18	
2	Kofi Kingston	World Tag Team Championship (original version, 1 time); World Tag Team Championship (current version, 7 times); WWE Tag Team Championship (7 times); NXT Tag Team Championship (1 time)	16	During his first three reigns with the current World Tag Team Championship, the title was known as the WWE Tag Team Championship. Midway through his 4th reign, it was renamed to Raw Tag Team Championship.; During all seven of his reigns with the current WWE Tag Team Championship, the title was known as the SmackDown Tag Team Championship.
3	Edge	World Tag Team Championship (original version, 12 times); World Tag Team Championship (current version, 2 times)	14	During his first seven reigns with the original World Tag Team Championship, the title was known as the WWF Tag Team Championship. During his 8th reign, it was known as the WWE Tag Team Championship.; During his two reigns with the current World Tag Team Championship, the title was known as the WWE Tag Team Championship.; During his 12th and 2nd respective reigns with the original and current World Tag Team Championships, he held both titles together as the Unified WWE Tag Team Championship.
3	Booker T	WCW World Tag Team Championship (11 times); World Tag Team Championship (original version, 3 times)	14	During his 11th reign with the WCW World Tag Team Championship, the title was known as the WCW Tag Team Championship.; During his first reign with the original World Tag Team Championship, the title was known as the WWF Tag Team Championship.
4	Xavier Woods	World Tag Team Championship (current version, 5 times); WWE Tag Team Championship (7 times); NXT Tag Team Championship (1 time)	13	During his first reign with the current World Tag Team Championship, the title was known as the WWE Tag Team Championship. Midway through his 2nd reign, it was renamed to Raw Tag Team Championship.; During all seven of his reigns with the current WWE Tag Team Championship, the title was known as the SmackDown Tag Team Championship.
5	Kane	World Tag Team Championship (original version, 9 times); World Tag Team Championship (current version, 2 times); WCW World Tag Team Championship (1 time)	12	During his first six reigns with the original World Tag Team Championship, the title was known as the WWF Tag Team Championship. During his 7th reign, it was known as the WWE Tag Team Championship. Midway through this reign, it was renamed World Tag Team Championship.; During his two reigns with the current World Tag Team Championship, the title was known as the WWE Tag Team Championship.; During his one reign with the WCW World Tag Team Championship, the title was known as the WCW Tag Team Championship.; Kane and The Undertaker were the first of two tag teams to have held the WWF and WCW Tag Team Championships together.
5	Matt Hardy	World Tag Team Championship (original version, 6 times); World Tag Team Championship (current version, 3 times); WWE Tag Team Championship (1 time); WCW World Tag Team Championship (1 time); NXT Tag Team Championship (1 time)	12	During his first five reigns with the original World Tag Team Championship, the title was known as the WWF Tag Team Championship.; During his first reign with the current World Tag Team Championship, the title was known as the WWE Tag Team Championship and during his 2nd & 3rd reigns, it was known as the Raw Tag Team Championship.; During his one reign with the current WWE Tag Team Championship, the title was known as the SmackDown Tag Team Championship.; During his one reign with the WCW World Tag Team Championship, the title was known as the WCW Tag Team Championship.
6	Billy Gunn	World Tag Team Championship (original version, 10 times); World Tag Team Championship (current version, 1 time)	11	During his 10 reigns with the original World Tag Team Championship, the title was known as the WWF Tag Team Championship.; During his one reign with the current World Tag Team Championship, the title was known as the WWE Tag Team Championship.
6	Big Show	World Tag Team Championship (original version, 5 times); World Tag Team Championship (current version, 3 times); WCW World Tag Team Championship (3 times)	11	During his first two reigns with the original World Tag Team Championship, the title was known as the WWF Tag Team Championship.; During his three reigns with the current World Tag Team Championship, the title was known as the WWE Tag Team Championship.; During his 4th and 5th reigns with the original World Tag Team Championship and 1st and 2nd with the current World Tag Team Championship, both titles were held together as the Unified WWE Tag Team Championship.
6	Jey Uso	World Tag Team Championship (current version, 6 times); WWE Tag Team Championship (5 times)	11	During his first two reigns with the current World Tag Team Championship, the title was known as the WWE Tag Team Championship.; During all five of his reigns with the current WWE Tag Team Championship, the title was known as the SmackDown Tag Team Championship.
6	Kevin Nash	World Tag Team Championship (original version, 2 times); WCW World Tag Team Championship (9 times)	11	During his two reigns with the original World Tag Team Championship, the title was known as the WWF World Tag Team Championship.

==== Female ====
The following list shows the female wrestlers who have the most reigns in total for women's tag team championships, combining all titles they have held as recognized by WWE. This list also shows the titles that they won to achieve this record (minimum of three reigns).

No.	Champion	Titles	No. of reigns	Notes
1	Raquel Rodriguez	NXT Women's Tag Team Championship (2 times); WWE Women's Tag Team Championship (6 times)	8	For her two reigns with the NXT Women's Tag Team Championship, she was known as Raquel González and she was one-half of the inaugural championship team. She became Raquel Rodriguez before winning her first WWE Women's Tag Team Championship.
2	Alexa Bliss	WWE Women's Tag Team Championship (4 times)	4	
2	Asuka	WWE Women's Tag Team Championship (4 times)	4	
2	Dakota Kai	NXT Women's Tag Team Championship (2 times); WWE Women's Tag Team Championship (2 times)	4	Kai was one-half of the inaugural NXT Women's Tag Team Champions.
2	Iyo Sky	NXT Women's Tag Team Championship (1 time); WWE Women's Tag Team Championship (3 times)	4	She was known as Io Shirai when she held the NXT Women's Tag Team Championship. She became Iyo Sky before winning her first WWE Women's Tag Team Championship.
2	Liv Morgan	WWE Women's Tag Team Championship (4 times)	4	
3	Nikki Cross	WWE Women's Tag Team Championship (3 times)	3	She was known as Nikki A.S.H. during her third reign.
3	Sasha Banks	WWE Women's Tag Team Championship (3 times)	3	Banks was one-half of the inaugural WWE Women's Tag Team Champions.
3	Shayna Baszler	WWE Women's Tag Team Championship (3 times)	3	

== See also ==
- Women's championships in WWE
- World championships in WWE
