= World Tag Team Championship (WWE) =

Men's professional wrestling championship

- The current World Tag Team Championship belt with default side plates (2024–present)

Details
- Promotion: WWE
- Brand: Raw
- Date established: October 20, 2002
- Current champions: Penta and Je'Von Evans
- Date won: November 7, 2026

Other names
- WWE Tag Team Championship (2002–2016); Unified WWE Tag Team Championship (2009–2010) (Note: In tandem with the original World Tag Team Championship.); WWE Raw Tag Team Championship (2016–2024); Undisputed WWE Tag Team Championship (2022–2024) (Note: In tandem with the then-WWE SmackDown Tag Team Championship.); World Tag Team Championship (2024–present)
Statistics
- First champions: Kurt Angle and Chris Benoit
- Most reigns: As a tag team (5 reigns): The New Day (Kofi Kingston and Xavier Woods) (Note: During their first two reigns, Big E was also recognized as champion under the Freebird Rule.); As an individual (7 reigns): Kofi Kingston
- Longest reign: The New Day (Big E, Kofi Kingston, and Xavier Woods) (Note: During their first two reigns, The New Day, which at the time consisted of Big E, Kofi Kingston, and Xavier Woods, defended the championship under the Freebird Rule; Big E was split from the team in the 2020 WWE Draft.) (2nd reign, 483 days)
- Shortest reign: John Cena and The Miz (9 minutes)
- Oldest champion: R-Truth (52 years, 78 days)
- Youngest champion: Nicholas (10 years)
- Heaviest champion: Big Show and Kane (808 lb (367 kg) combined)
- Lightest champion: Paul London and Brian Kendrick (365 lb (166 kg) combined)

The World Tag Team Championship is a men's professional wrestling world tag team championship created and promoted by the American promotion WWE, defended on the Raw brand division. It is one of two male tag team championships for WWE's main roster, along with the WWE Tag Team Championship on SmackDown. The current champions are Penta and Je'Von Evans, who are in their first reign, both as a team and individually. They won the title by defeating The Vision (Bron Breakker and Austin Theory) at Crown Jewel on November 7, 2026.

The championship was originally established as the WWE Tag Team Championship on October 20, 2002, and the team of Kurt Angle and Chris Benoit were the inaugural champions. It was introduced for the SmackDown brand as a second title for tag teams in the promotion to complement WWE's original World Tag Team Championship, which became exclusive to Raw. Both titles were unified in 2009 and were collectively referred to as the Unified WWE Tag Team Championship while officially remaining independently active until the original World Tag Team Championship was formally decommissioned in 2010.

As a result of the 2016 WWE Draft, the championship became exclusive to Raw and was renamed as the Raw Tag Team Championship, with SmackDown creating their own counterpart, the SmackDown Tag Team Championship. From May 2022 until April 2024, both titles were held and defended together as the Undisputed WWE Tag Team Championship, with each maintaining their individual lineages. Under the Undisputed banner, both titles simultaneously became the first tag team championships to be defended in the main event of WWE's flagship event, WrestleMania, which occurred as the main event of WrestleMania 39 – Night 1 in April 2023. The titles would again be defended in the main event of a pay-per-view and livestreaming event at Night of Champions the following month. The titles were then split at WrestleMania XL in April 2024 with the Raw Tag Team Championship subsequently renamed as the World Tag Team Championship with the SmackDown title becoming the WWE Tag Team Championship.

== History ==
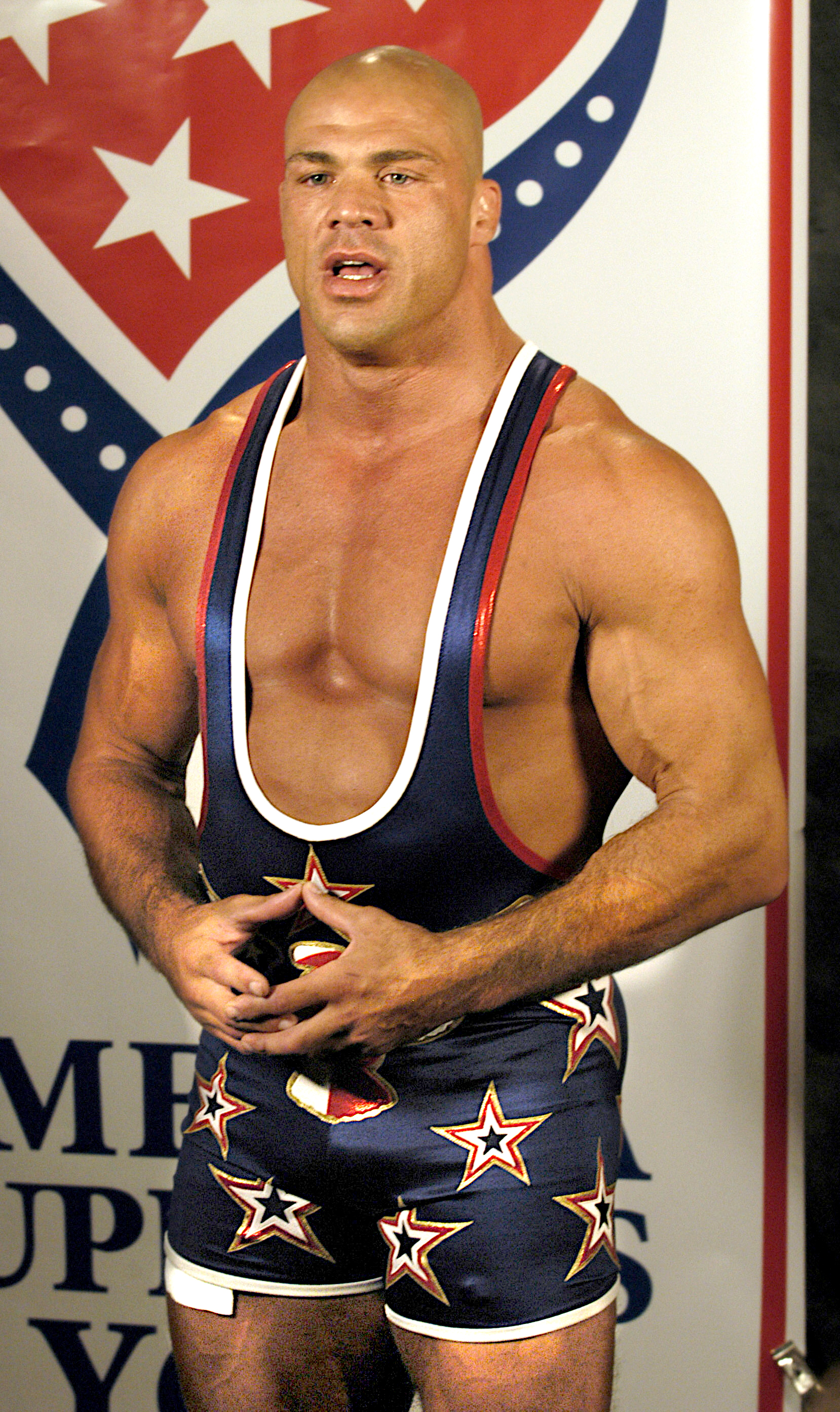
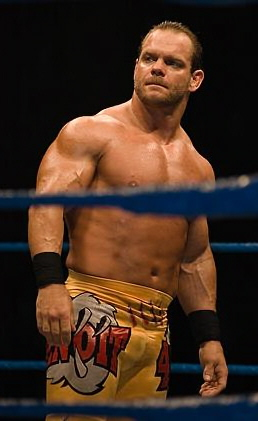
Inaugural champions Kurt Angle and Chris Benoit, who won the title as the WWE Tag Team Championship

From 1971 until 2002, American professional wrestling promotion WWE, then known as the World Wrestling Federation (WWF), held the primary men's world tag team championship, the original World Tag Team Championship (formerly the WWF Tag Team Championship), as the sole tag team championship. Following The Invasion storyline, WWF's roster doubled in size due to the influx of wrestlers from the former promotions, World Championship Wrestling and Extreme Championship Wrestling. For a brief period, it co-existed with the WCW Tag Team Championship until it was unified with the WWF Tag Team Championship in November 2001. As a result, the WWF introduced the brand extension in March 2002 to divide its roster between the Raw and SmackDown! brands where wrestlers would exclusively perform on their respective weekly television programs. The original World Tag Team Championship initially became exclusive to SmackDown!, but was later reassigned to Raw, leaving the former without a tag team title. As a result, SmackDown! General Manager Stephanie McMahon introduced the WWE Tag Team Championship and commissioned it to be the tag team title for the SmackDown! brand on October 3, 2002. She also announced that the inaugural champions would be determined from an eight-team tournament. At No Mercy on October 20, 2002, the team of Kurt Angle and Chris Benoit defeated Rey Mysterio and Edge in the tournament final to become the inaugural WWE Tag Team Champions.

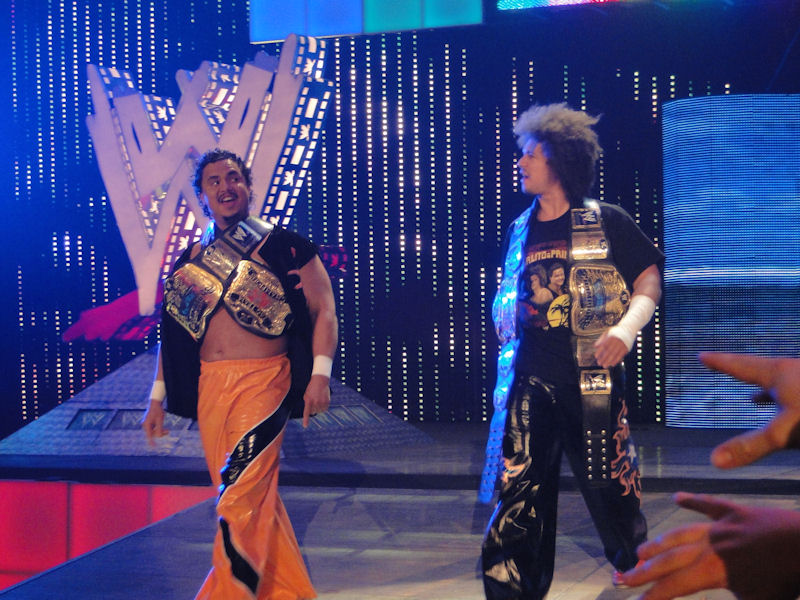
The Colóns (Primo and Carlito) unified the World Tag Team Championship and WWE Tag Team Championship as the Unified WWE Tag Team Championship

On October 17, 2007, SmackDown! and ECW (which became a third brand in 2006) announced a talent sharing agreement that enabled talent from either brand's roster to compete on both brands. As a result, the title became eligible to be contended and defended on both brands. In late 2008 through early 2009, reigning WWE Tag Team Champions The Colóns (Carlito and Primo) engaged in rivalry with reigning World Tag Team Champions John Morrison and The Miz, which resulted in the announcement on the March 17 episode of ECW that at WrestleMania 25, both teams would defend their titles against each other and the winning team would hold both titles. The Colóns defeated Morrison and Miz, and thus unified the titles into what became known as the Unified WWE Tag Team Championship, the umbrella term for what officially remained two active championships that were now collectively defended. The championships would be defended as the Unified WWE Tag Team Championship on any brand until August 2010. That month, the Anonymous Raw General Manager announced that the World Tag Team Championship would be decommissioned in favor of continuing the WWE Tag Team Championship, which received a new, single set of championship belts, which were presented to reigning champions The Hart Dynasty (Tyson Kidd and David Hart Smith) by Bret Hart. The WWE Tag Team Championship, which dropped the "unified" moniker, subsequently became the sole tag team championship in WWE, available to any brand. The first brand extension then ended in August 2011.

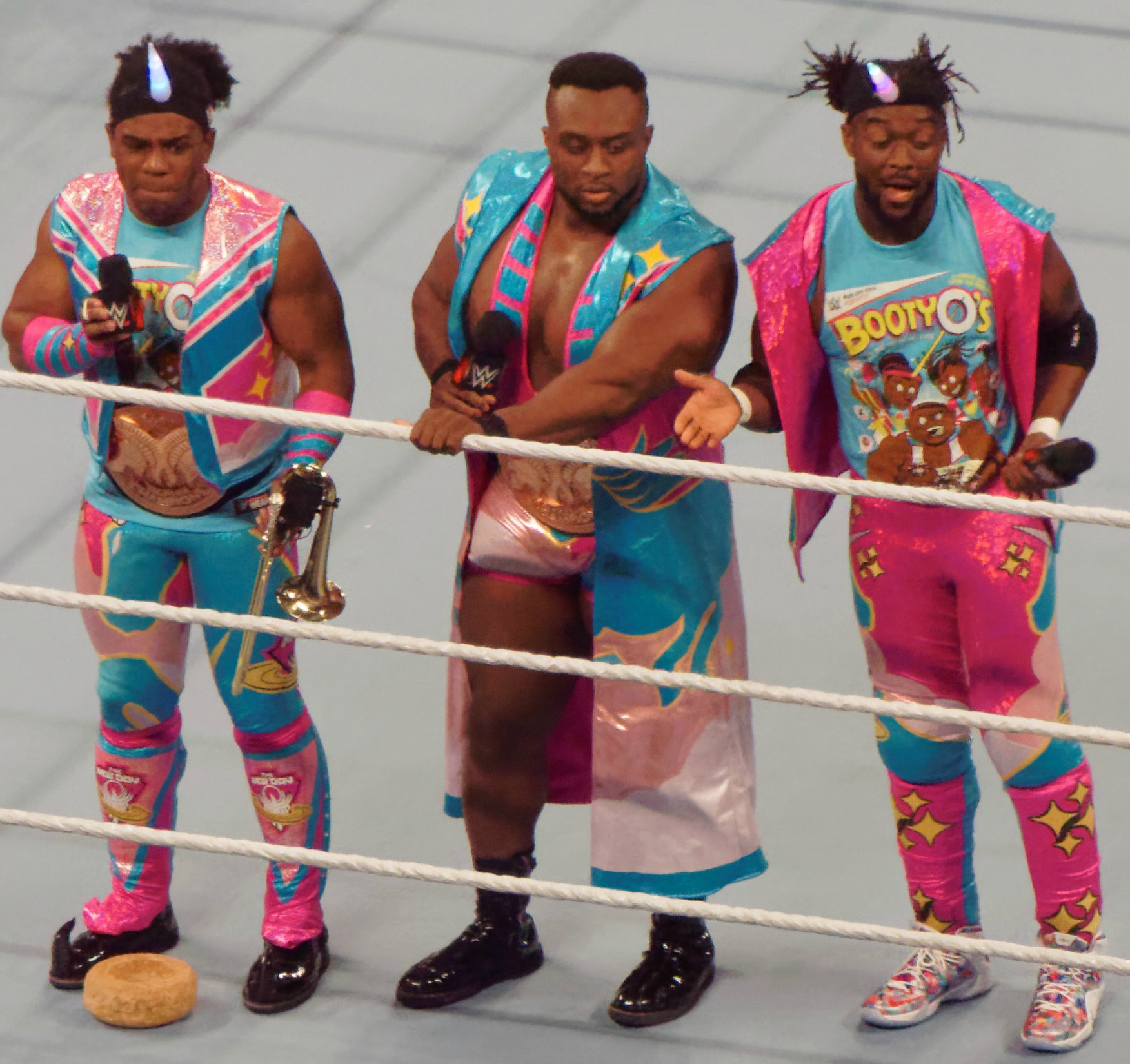
The New Day are five-time and longest-reigning champions at 483 days for their second reign, as well as having the longest combined reign at 699 days; during their first two reigns, Big E, Kofi Kingston, and Xavier Woods were all recognized as champion under the Freebird Rule.

Following the reintroduction of the brand extension in July 2016, reigning champions The New Day (Big E, Kofi Kingston, and Xavier Woods) were drafted to the Raw brand, making the championship exclusive to Raw. In response, SmackDown created the SmackDown Tag Team Championship on August 23, 2016. The WWE Tag Team Championship was subsequently renamed to Raw Tag Team Championship and The New Day were the first champions to hold the title under its new name. In 2019, WWE's developmental territory NXT became the promotion's third major brand when it was moved to the USA Network in September, thus making the NXT Tag Team Championship the third major tag team title for men in WWE. However, this recognition was reversed when NXT reverted to its original function as a developmental brand in September 2021.

At WrestleMania 34 on April 8, 2018, reigning Raw Tag Team Champions Cesaro and Sheamus were scheduled to defend the title against Braun Strowman and a partner of his choosing. At the event, Strowman revealed that his partner would be a fan from the live audience. He then went out into the crowd and picked 10-year old Nicholas, and the two defeated Cesaro and Sheamus for the title. This made Nicholas the youngest WWE champion in history. Nicholas was also revealed to be the son of WWE referee, John Cone. The following night on Raw, the two relinquished the titles.

The Usos holding both the Raw and SmackDown tag titles, which when held together were known as the Undisputed WWE Tag Team Championship; despite maintaining their individual lineages

During the May 20, 2022, episode of SmackDown, reigning SmackDown Tag Team Champions The Usos (Jey Uso and Jimmy Uso) defeated reigning Raw Tag Team Champions RK-Bro (Randy Orton and Riddle) in a Winners Take All match to claim both championships and become recognized as the Undisputed WWE Tag Team Champions. WWE had billed the match as a championship unification match; however, both titles remained independently active. The Usos had defended both titles together across both brands as the Undisputed WWE Tag Team Championship, but on a couple of occasions in early 2023, they also defended the titles separately.

In the main event of WrestleMania 39 Night 1, The Usos (Jey Uso and Jimmy Uso) defended the Undisputed WWE Tag Team Championship against the team of Kevin Owens and Sami Zayn. This subsequently made both the Raw and SmackDown titles the first tag team championships to be defended in the main event of WWE's flagship event, WrestleMania. At the event, Owens and Zayn defeated The Usos to become champions. The titles would again be defended in the main event of a pay-per-view and livestreaming event at Night of Champions the following month on May 27 when Owens and Zayn retained the titles against The Bloodline (Roman Reigns and Solo Sikoa).

At WrestleMania XL Night 1 on April 6, 2024, The Judgment Day (Finn Bálor and Damian Priest) defended the Undisputed WWE Tag Team Championship in a Six-Pack Tag Team Ladder match in which both sets of championships had to be retrieved for the match to end. As a result, the championships were split with Awesome Truth (The Miz and R-Truth) winning the Raw Tag Team Championship while A-Town Down Under (Austin Theory and Grayson Waller) won the SmackDown titles. A week later on the April 15 episode of Raw, the Raw Tag Team Championship was renamed as the World Tag Team Championship with a new set of championship belts. The SmackDown Tag Team Championship was then renamed as the WWE Tag Team Championship with its own new set of belts on the April 19 episode of SmackDown.

=== Inaugural WWE Tag Team Championship Tournament (2002) ===
1st Round; SmackDown! October 1–8, 2002 (Aired: October 3–10)
Los Guerreros (Chavo Guerrero and Eddie Guerrero)	Submission
Mark Henry and Rikishi	5:16
Chris Benoit and Kurt Angle	Submission
Billy Kidman and John Cena	7:51
Reverend D-Von and Ron Simmons	Pinfall
Billy and Chuck (Billy Gunn and Chuck Palumbo)	4:07
Edge and Rey Mysterio	Pinfall
Brock Lesnar and Tajiri	7:23

Semifinals; SmackDown! October 15, 2002 (Aired: October 17)
Los Guerreros	10:45
Chris Benoit and Kurt Angle	Pinfall
Reverend D-Von and Ron Simmons	4:40
Edge and Rey Mysterio	Pinfall

Final; No Mercy; October 20, 2002
Chris Benoit and Kurt Angle	Submission
Edge and Rey Mysterio	22:01

== Brand designation history ==
Following the events of the WWE brand extension, an annual WWE draft was established, in which select members of WWE's roster are reassigned to a different brand. After the WWE Tag Team Championship was unified with the World Tag Team Championship as the Unified WWE Tag Team Championship, the champions could appear and defend the titles on any WWE brand. The World Tag Team Championship was decommissioned in August 16, 2010, leaving the WWE Tag Team Championship as WWE's sole tag team title, which dropped the "Unified" moniker, received a new single set of belts, and continued to be defended on any brand. The brand extension was discontinued on August 29, 2011, but it was revived on July 19, 2016. The following is a list of dates indicating the transitions of the current World Tag Team Championship between the Raw, SmackDown, and ECW brands.

Date of transition	Brand	Notes
October 20, 2002	SmackDown	Championship established as the WWE Tag Team Championship for SmackDown after the World Tag Team Championship became exclusive to Raw. Kurt Angle and Chris Benoit became the inaugural champions at No Mercy.
November 13, 2007	ECW	The WWE Tag Team Championship moved to ECW after John Morrison and The Miz, members of the ECW brand, defeated Matt Hardy and Montel Vontavious Porter to win the WWE Tag Team Championship. However, as part of a talent exchange agreement between SmackDown and ECW, teams of either brand could challenge for the title.
July 20, 2008	SmackDown	The WWE Tag Team Championship returned to SmackDown after Curt Hawkins and Zack Ryder, members of the SmackDown brand, defeated John Morrison and The Miz to win the WWE Tag Team Championship. The talent exchange agreement was still in effect during this time.
April 5, 2009	N/A	At WrestleMania 25, The Colóns unified the WWE Tag Team Championship and World Tag Team Championship as the Unified WWE Tag Team Championship. Both titles remained active and were defended on any brand. The World Tag Team Championship was decommissioned on August 16, 2010, and "Unified" was dropped from the name.
July 19, 2016	Raw	Reintroduction of brand split. WWE Tag Team Champions The New Day (Big E, Kofi Kingston, and Xavier Woods) were drafted to Raw during the 2016 WWE Draft. The title was renamed to Raw Tag Team Championship after SmackDown introduced the SmackDown Tag Team Championship. The title was renamed to World Tag Team Championship on the April 15, 2024, episode of Raw.

== Belt designs ==
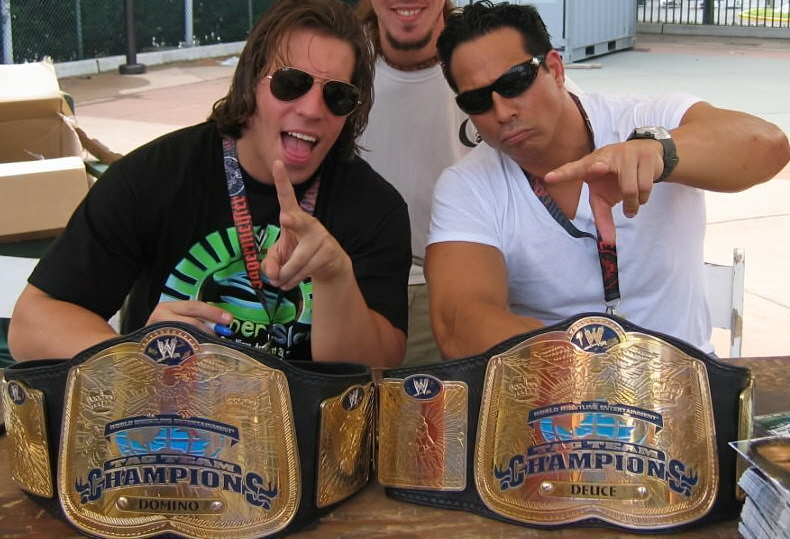
Deuce 'n Domino (right and left) with the original 2002–2010 design of the championship when it was known as the WWE Tag Team Championship of SmackDown!

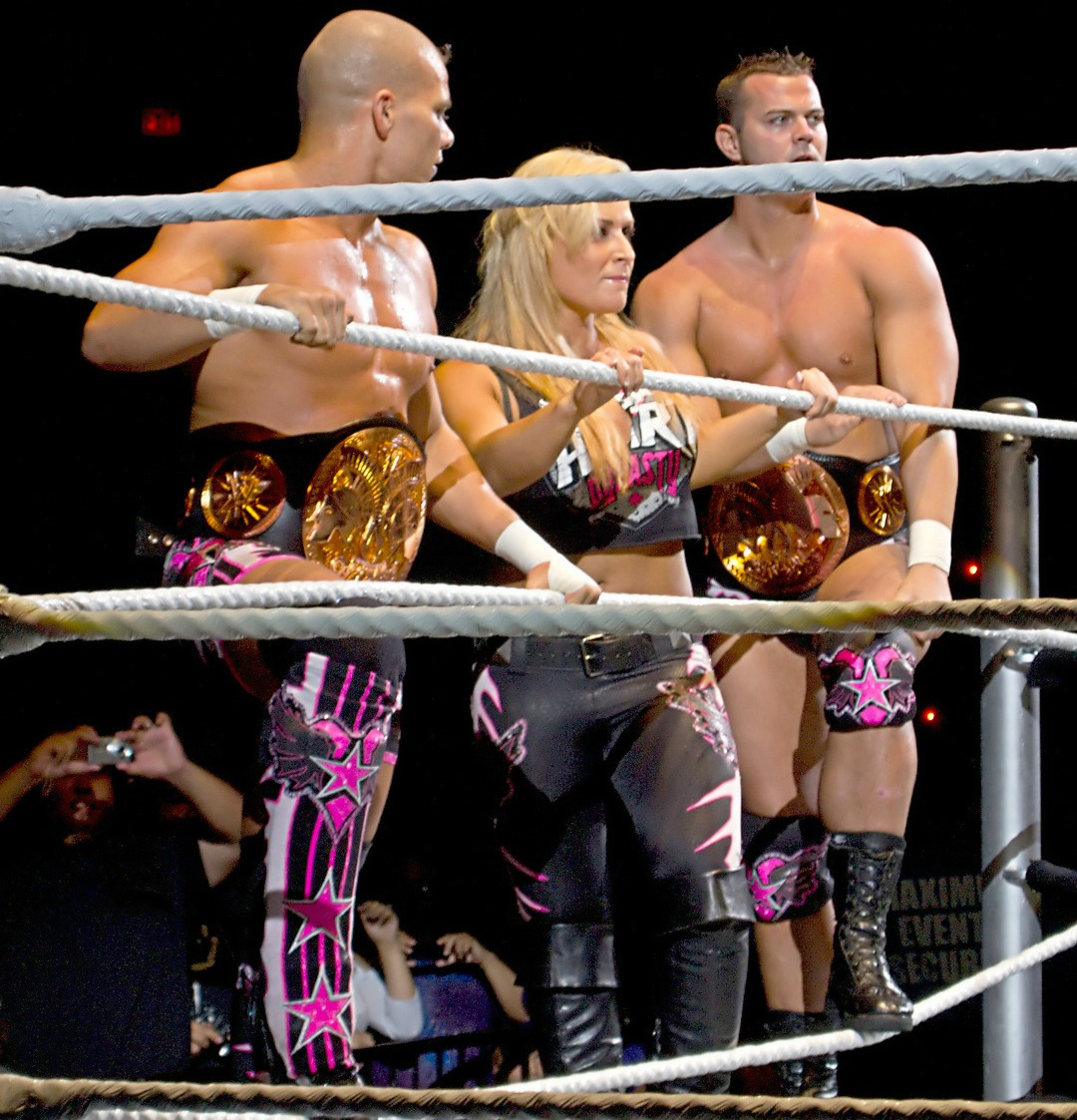
The Hart Dynasty (Tyson Kidd and David Hart Smith, with Natalya) with the redesigned 2010–2016 version of the WWE Tag Team Championship

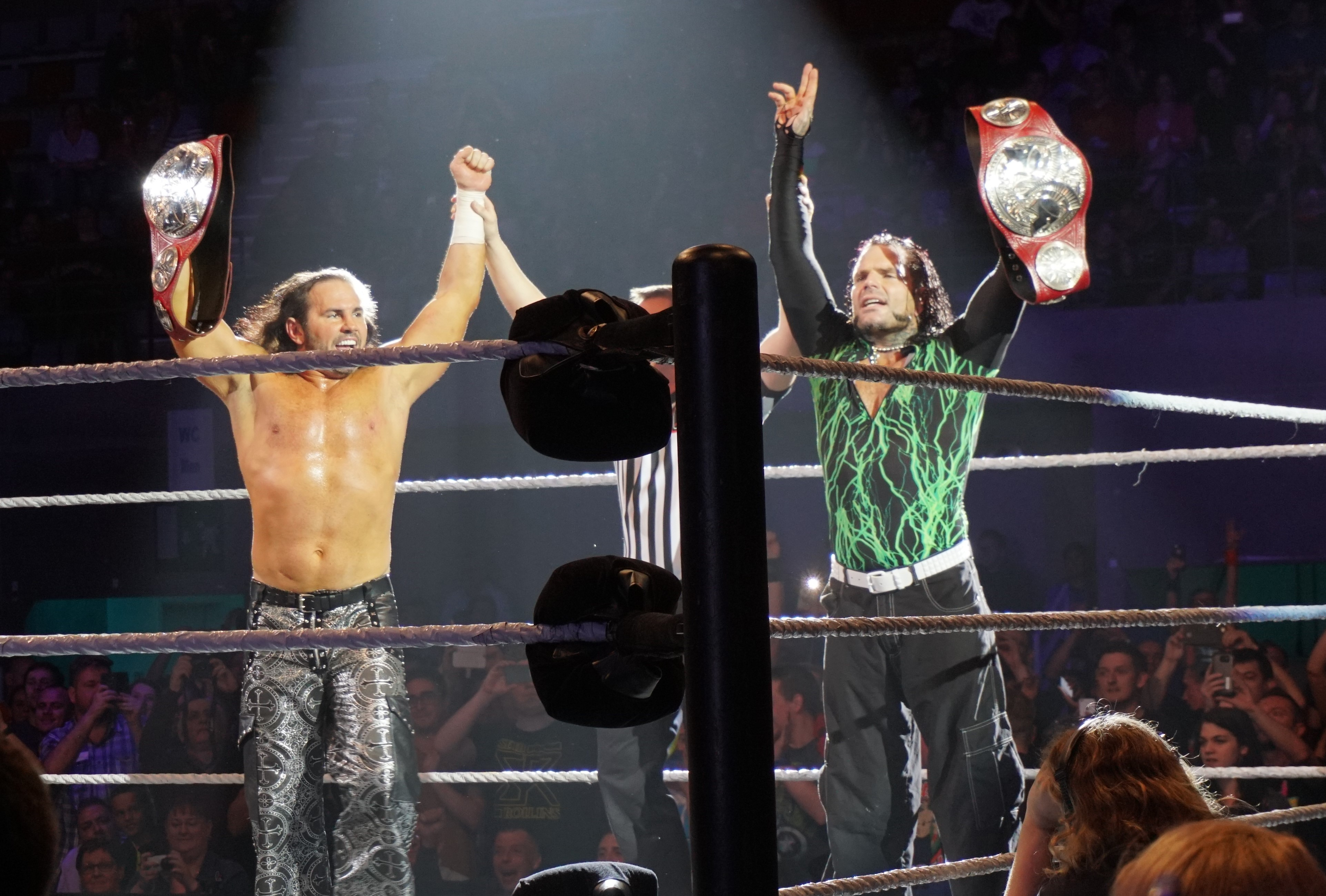
The Hardy Boyz (Matt Hardy and Jeff Hardy) with the 2016–2024 design when the title was known as the Raw Tag Team Championship

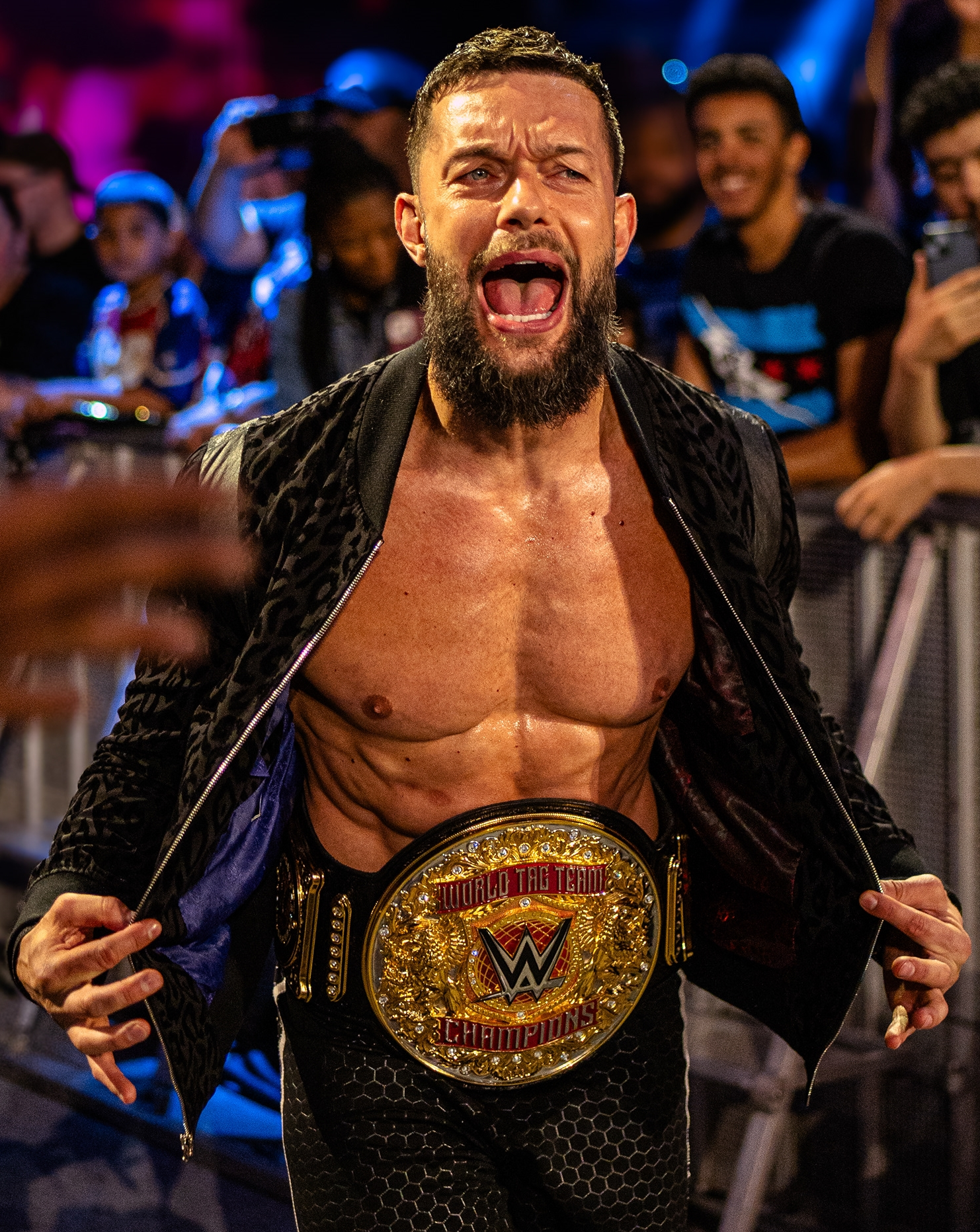
Finn Bálor with the current World Tag Team Championship design, introduced in 2024

The original design of the title belt when it was introduced as the WWE Tag Team Championship featured a design that was similar to the 1985 to 2002 version of the original World Tag Team Championship, with gold plates on black straps. It featured a similar center plate with an eagle and crown designs alongside a blue globe at the center. On top, it featured the company's scratch logo on a blue background. The gold text in the blue ribbon read "World Wrestling Entertainment" while the bottom read "TAG TEAM" in a blue background and "CHAMPIONS" in blue text. The inner side plates were gold and featured two wrestlers grappling with the WWE logo at the top on a blue background, while the outer side plates were simply the company logo on a blue background.

In August 2010, the WWE Tag Team Championship received a redesign, replacing the previous design that had been used in tandem with the original World Tag Team Championship to represent the Unified WWE Tag Team Championship since April 2009. The belts were on black straps with copper plates. Taking inspiration from Greece, the center plate was dominated by two Spartan helmets facing outward and it was encircled with a meander pattern. At the top of the center plate was the WWE scratch logo and at the bottom was a banner that read "Tag Team" on one line and "Champions" below that; above the Tag Team banner read "World Wrestling Entertainment" in small print. On both sides of the center plate were two side plates. The inner side plates featured the WWE scratch logo and were encircled with the meander pattern, while the outer side plates featured a single Spartan helmet facing inward. A version with two name plates on the center plate, one for each champion, had been created but was not used. In August 2014, the belts, along with all other pre-existing championship belts in WWE at the time, received a minor update, replacing the scratch logo with WWE's current logo that was originally used for the WWE Network that launched earlier that year in February. According to well-known belt maker Dave Millican, who designed and created the belts, he wanted to go with either nickel, silver, or gold for the plates, but WWE, in particular Stephanie McMahon, wanted copper to do something different that was not done elsewhere.

In August 2016, after the reintroduction of the brand split and the creation of the SmackDown Tag Team Championship, the WWE Tag Team Championship was renamed to Raw Tag Team Championship. The belts then received an update on December 19 that year to reflect the name change. They featured the same physical design, but the plates were silver and the straps changed to red, countering the silver plates on blue straps design of the SmackDown Tag Team Championship belts. While all other WWE championship belts were updated to feature customizable side plates for the champion's logos, the Raw and SmackDown tag titles lacked these features.

On the April 15, 2024, episode of Raw, coinciding with the Raw Tag Team Championship being renamed the World Tag Team Championship 2002 to 2010 and 2010 to 2016 versions similar to the NXT UK Tag Team Championship was replaced with a new design. At the center plate is the WWE logo set over a globe, similar to the World Heavyweight Championship and Women's World Championship belts, with a red background and placed on a shield flanked by two dragons in a similar manner to a coat of arms. Above the globe is a banner that reads "WORLD TAG TEAM" while below the globe is another banner that reads "CHAMPIONS", both in silver and with a red background. The plates are on black straps with metal endplates, and gold divider bars separate the center plate from the two side plates. The side plates are now customizable with the reigning champions' logo; the default side plates feature the WWE logo on a red globe.

== Reigns ==
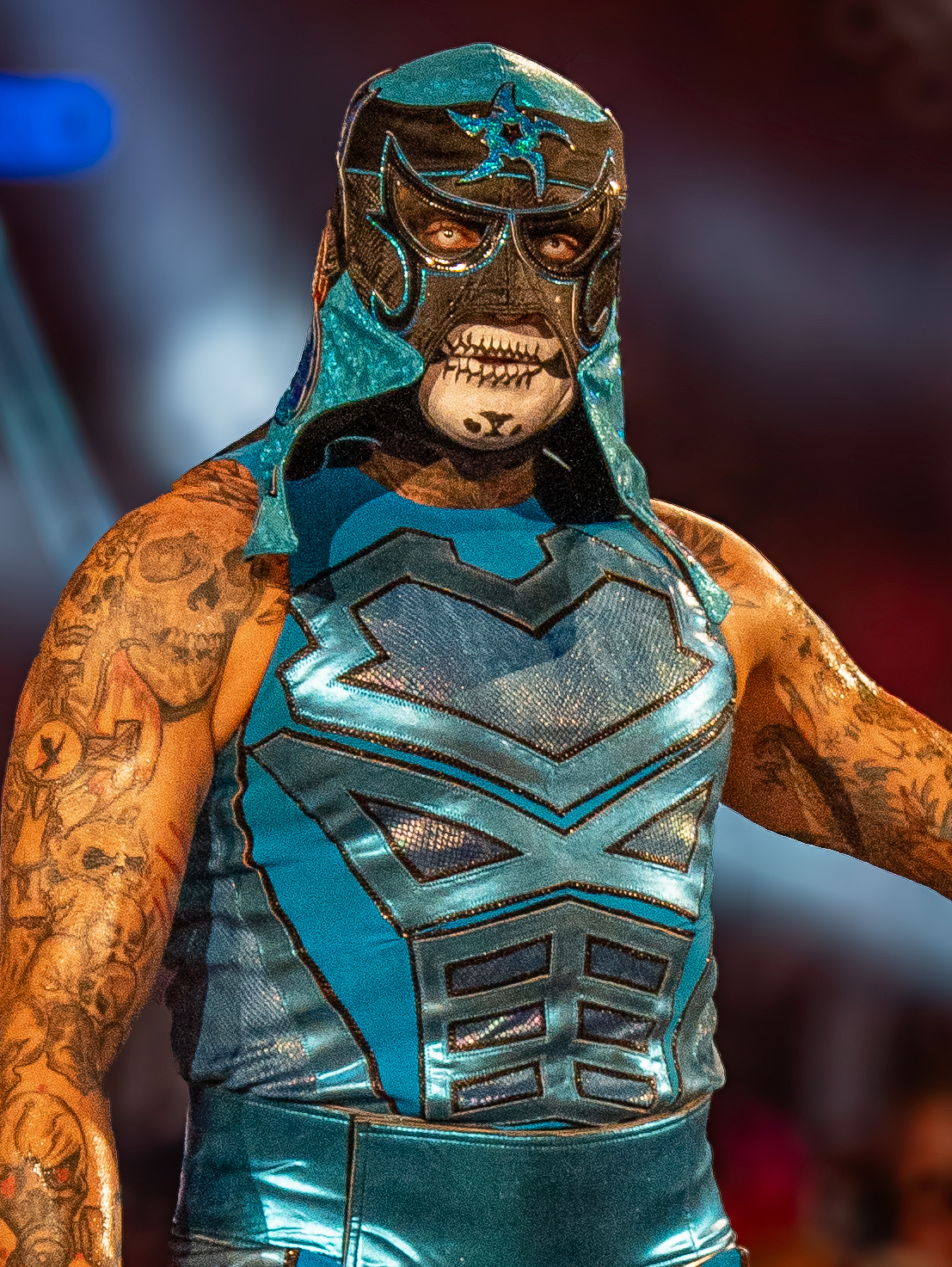
Current champions Penta and Je'Von Evans

As of November 14, 2026, there have been 103 reigns among 75 teams composed of 109 individual champions, and one vacancy. The New Day (Kofi Kingston and Xavier Woods) have the most reigns as a team at five, while individually, Kingston has the most with seven. The New Day's second reign is also the longest reign at 483 days and they are the only team to hold the championship for over one consecutive year—Big E is also credited for this reign as during New Day's first two reigns, Big E, Kofi Kingston, and Xavier Woods were all recognized as champion under the Freebird Rule (Big E was split from the team in the 2020 WWE Draft). John Cena and The Miz's sole reign is the shortest reign at 9 minutes, due to The Corre invoking their rematch clause immediately after losing the title. As a team, The New Day (across its two different variants of team members) also have the longest combined reign at 699 days, while Kingston individually has the longest combined reign at 984 days (982 days as recognized by WWE). Nicholas is the youngest champion at 10 years old (also making him the youngest champion in WWE history), while R-Truth is the oldest champion at age 52.

Penta and Je'Von Evans are the current champions in their first reign, both as a team and individually. They won the title by defeating The Vision (Bron Breakker and Austin Theory) at Crown Jewel on November 7, 2026, in Riyadh, Saudi Arabia.

== See also ==
- Tag team championships in WWE

== Notes ==
Sporting positions
Preceded by WWE World Tag Team Championship (original version)	WWE's top tag team championship 2002–present	Succeeded by Current
