= Universal Lucha Libre =

Japanese professional wrestling promotion

- Founded: 1990
- Defunct: 1995
- Style: Lucha Libre
- Headquarters: Japan
- Predecessor: Newborn UWF
- Successor: Michinoku Pro Wrestling; Oita Attractive Merry World Pro-Wrestling

Universal Lucha Libre (Universal Pro-Wrestling until 1991, Federación Universal de Lucha Libre afterward; UWF and FULL used as acronyms) was a professional wrestling promotion in Japan from 1990 to 1995 and again briefly in 1998. The name Universal Lucha Libre is used to differentiate the promotion from the Japanese UWF, a predecessor promotion which presented a very different style of professional wrestling.

== Overview ==
The promotion was the first in Japan to be based around the Mexican style of professional wrestling, known as Lucha Libre (free fighting). Although since 1956 some Mexican wrestlers had appeared in Japanese promotions, their style was mixed with the American-originated standard, and not many of them could rise above mid-card level because of their size, which on average was less than Japanese wrestlers.

The first Mexican luchador (wrestler) to become a star in Japan was Mil Máscaras, who competed for the Japanese Wrestling Association (JWA) and one of its successor groups, All Japan Pro Wrestling (AJPW). The first Japanese to win a Mexican-based title was Mashio Koma, who also competed in JWA; he won the NWA World Middleweight Championship while on a tour of EMLL in 1970, and later co-founded AJPW with Giant Baba. However, the first Japanese to fully and truly adopt the fast, high flying Lucha Libre style actually came from rival New Japan Pro-Wrestling: Gran Hamada, who had gone on excursion several times to Mexico due to his lack of size and won many titles there. In 1990, after passing through New Japan, the original Japanese UWF, and All-Japan, Hamada decided to form his own promotion, with the aid of his student Yoshihiro Asai, his former New Japan boss Hisashi Shinma, and some Mexican wrestlers and Japanese rookies he had recruited.

In 1991, the promotion had a brief working relationship with the World Wrestling Federation, this led to the creation of the WWF Intercontinental Tag Team Championship.

In 1993, with Universal Lucha Libre on the decline, competitors Great Sasuke (Masa Michinoku), Taka Michinoku and Jinsei Shinzaki (Mongolian Yuga) decided to form their own promotion, Michinoku Pro. Jado and Gedo (Coolie SZ and Bulldog KT) moved to hardcore independent promotions such as Wrestling International New Generations and Frontier Martial-Arts Wrestling, while Ultimo Dragon (Yoshihiro Asai) joined Genichiro Tenryu's WAR group. Hamada continued promoting shows until he himself joined Michinoku Pro in 1995, which brought Universal Lucha Libre to an end. Hamada would briefly run shows under the Universal banner again in 1998 before joining Oita Attractive Merry World Pro-Wrestling.

== Alumni ==
Over the years, the roster of Universal's trainees would go on to become major stars in both the Japanese major promotions and the independents. Among Universal Lucha Libre alumni, they include:

- Yoshihiro Asai (later Ultimo Dragon)
- Masa Michinoku (later The Great Sasuke)
- Monkey Magic Wakita (later Super Delfin)
- Bulldog KT (later Gedo)
- Coolie SZ (later Jado)
- Taka Michinoku
- Shiryu (later Kaz Hayashi)
- Mongolian Yuga (later Jinsei Shinzaki)
- Terry Boy (later Men's Teioh)
- Sakigake Gantetsu (later Dick Togo)

Among the few foreigners of American origin who competed for the promotion were Lightning Kid and Jerry Lynn.

== Championships ==
Championship	Date retired
UWF Super Middleweight Championship	1995
UWF Super Welterweight Championship	November 28, 1999
UWA/UWF Intercontinental Tag Team Championship	March 6, 2005
WWF Intercontinental Tag Team Championship	1991

== See also ==
- Universal Wrestling Association
- Michinoku Pro Wrestling
- Osaka Pro Wrestling
- Kaientai Dojo
