= WWF Intercontinental Tag Team Championship =

Championship in the World Wrestling Federation

Details
- Promotion: World Wrestling Federation; UWF Japan
- Date established: January 7, 1991
- Date retired: July 1991
Statistics
- First champions: Perro Aguayo and Gran Hamada
- Final champions: Perro Aguayo and Gran Hamada
- Oldest champion: Perro Aguayo (44 years, 354 days)
- Youngest champion: Gran Hamada (40 years, 41 days)
- Heaviest champion: Perro Aguayo (216 lbs)
- Lightest champion: Gran Hamada (203 lbs)

The WWF Intercontinental Tag Team Championship was a championship in the World Wrestling Federation (WWF, now WWE) during 1991. The belts were abandoned later in July 1991 when the WWF severed ties with UWF Japan.

== Reigns ==
Key
No.	Overall reign number
Reign	Reign number for the specific team—reign numbers for the individuals are in parentheses, if different
Days	Number of days held

No.	Champion	Championship change			Reign statistics		Notes	Ref.
No.	Champion	Date	Event	Location	Reign	Days	Notes	Ref.
1	Perro Aguayo and Gran Hamada	January 7, 1991	N/A	N/A	1	Uncertain	Awarded the titles. During this reign, Aguayo and Hamada also held the UWA World Tag Team Championship.	
—	Deactivated	July 1991	—	—	—	—	The championship was abandoned in 1991 when the WWF severed ties with UWF Japan. The title was later replaced by the UWA/UWF Intercontinental Tag Team Championship.	

== See also ==
- List of former championships in WWE
- Tag team championships in WWE
