= List of IWRG shows in 2019 =

2019 International Wrestling Revolution Group

2019

International Wrestling Revolution Group shows chronology
← Previous; 2018	Next → 2020

The Mexican Lucha libre, or professional wrestling promotion International Wrestling Revolution Group (IWRG) has produced and scripted a number of wrestling shows since their creation on January 1, 1996 by promoter Adolfo "Pirata" Moreno. In 2019, IWRG held a total of 50 shows, just under one show per week, all in Arena Naucalpan. On thirteen occasions the main event of the show was a championship match and on six occasions the main event was a Lucha de Apuestas, or "bet match". (Note: All statistics are supported by the individual sources in the table.)

== 2019 events ==
Date	Event	Main Event	Ref.
January 1, 2019	IWRG 23rd Anniversary Show	Toscano vs Máscara Año 2000 Jr. in a Luchas de Apuestas, hair vs. hair, steel cage match	
January 6, 2019	IWRG show	Aramís, Imposible, Rokambole Jr. and Villano V Jr. vs. Capo del Norte, Capo del Sur, Dragon Bane, and El Hijo de Canis Lupus	
January 13, 2019	IWRG show	Los Oficiales (Oficial 911 and Oficial AK-47) (c) vs Las Tortugas Ninja (Leo and Mike) for the IWRG Intercontinental Tag Team Championship	
January 20, 2019	IWRG Zona de Ejecucion	16-man elimination match	
January 23, 2019	77. Torneo FILL	Angel Estrella Jr., Atomic Star, Black Dragon, Chef Benito, Chicanito, Death Metal, Lunatik Xtreme, and Puma de Oro vs. Crazy Latino, El Hijo del Pantera, Hermano Diablo II, Hijo del Timador, Kamikaze, Lasserado, Ursus, and Utamaro	
January 27, 2019	IWRG show	Los Oficiales (Oficial 911 and Oficial AK-47) (c) vs. Rokambole Jr. and Villano V Jr. for the IWRG Intercontinental Tag Team Championship	
January 31, 2019	Guerra de Dinastías	Los Guerreros Laguneros (Gran Guerrero and Último Guerrero) vs. Mr. Electro and Sharlie Rockstar	
February 3, 2019	IWRG show	Los Oficiales (Oficial 911 and Oficial AK-47) (c) vs. Capo del Norte and Capo del Surfor the IWRG Intercontinental Tag Team Championship	
February 10, 2019	IWRG show	Cerebro Negro (c) vs. Dragon Bane for the IWRG Intercontinental Welterweight Championship	
February 17, 2019	El Protector	8-team "Rookie/Veteran" tag team tournament	
February 24, 2019	IWRG Show	Death Metal and Heddi Karaoui vs. Los Oficiales (Oficial AK-47 and Oficial Fierro)	
March 3, 2019	Máscara vs. Cabellera	Drágon Bane (mask) vs. Death Metal (mask) vs. Cerebro Negro (hair) vs. Oficial AK-47 (hair) in a Lucha de Apuestas, mask vs, hair match	
March 10, 2019	IWRG Show	Aramís and Imposible vs. Dragon Bane and El Hijo de Canis Lupus in an IWRG Intercontinental Tag Team Championship tournament final	
March 20, 2019	79. Torneo FILL	Copa High Power torneo cibernetico match	
March 24, 2019	IWRG Show	Aramís and Imposible vs. Death Metal and Heddi Karaoui for the IWRG Intercontinental Tag Team Championship	
March 31, 2019	IWRG show	El Hijo del Medico Asesino vs. El Hijo de Canis Lupus (c) for the IWRG Junior de Juniors Championship	
April 7, 2019	Guerra del Golfo	steel cage match	
April 10, 2019	Todos juntos por Hip Hop Man	Aramís and Imposible (c) vs Capo Del Norte and Capo Del Sur for the IWRG Intercontinental Tag Team Championship	
April 14, 2019	80. Torneo FILL	Copa High Power torneo cibernetico match	
April 28, 2019	IWRG show	Aramís and Imposible (c) vs. Dragon Bane and El Hijo de Canis Lupus for the IWRG Intercontinental Tag Team Championship	
May 5, 2019	IWRG show	Aramís, Carístico and Imposible vs Las Traumas (Trauma I and Trauma II) and Emperador Azteca	
May 12, 2019	IWRG show	Los Traumas (Trauma I and Trauma II) Vs. Aramís and Imposible Vs. Dragon Bane and El Hijo de Canis Lupus	
May 19, 2019	Rey del Ring	30 man elimination match	
May 20, 2019	Copa High Power	Auzter, Black Dragon, Chef Benito, Death Metal, Latino, Neza Kid and Puma de Oro Vs. Caballero de Plata, Canibal Jr., Dragon Flt, Guerrero Olimpico, Historico, Imperial Jr., Marado and Mosca	
May 26, 2019	IWRG Show	Auzter, Black Dragón, Chef Benito, Chicanito, Death Metal, Latino, Neza Kid Jr., and Puma de Oro vs. Caballero de Plata, Canibal Jr., Dragón Fly, Guerrero Olímpico, Historico, Imperial Jr., and Marado, Mosca in a Lucha de Apuestas steel cage match	
June 1, 2019	IWRG show	Aramís, Imposible, Rokambole Jr. and Villano V Jr. Vs. Capo Del Norte, Capo Del Sur, Dragon Bane and El Hijo de Canis Lupus	
June 6, 2019	IWRG show	El Hijo de Canis Lupus and Penta el 0M Vs. Los Traumas (Trauma I and Trauma II)	
June 9, 2019	Mexican Championship Tournament	16 man elimination tournament	
June 16, 2019	Festival de las Máscaras	Dragon Bane, El Hijo de Canis Lupus, and Negro Casas Vs. Los Traumas (Trauma I and Trauma II) and Hechicero	
June 23, 2019	IWRG show	Dragon Bane and El Hijo de Canis Lupus Vs. Los Traumas (Trauma I and Trauma II)	
July 7, 2019	La Jaula de Las Locas	Jessy Ventura Vs. Diosa Atenea Vs. El Demasiado Vs. La Diva Salvaje Vs. Lilith Dark VsVs.. Lolita Vs. Miss Gaviota and Oscar El Hermoso and Pasion Crystal Vs. Soy Raymunda in a Lucha de Apuestas steel cage match	
July 21, 2019	IWRG show	Dr. Wagner Jr., El Hijo del Dr. Wagner Jr. and Galeno del Mal vs. El Hijo de Canis Lupus, El Mesías and Máscara Año 2000 Jr. Vs. Los Traumas (Trauma I and Trauma II) and El Hijo de Dos Caras	
July 24, 2019	83. Torneo FILL	Mexa Wrestling Vs. Ojo De Tigre Vs. Team Argentino Vs. Team Pachuca Vs. Team FILL IWRG Vs. Gym Villanos Vs. Gym Zeus Vs. Saetas Del Ring	
August 4, 2019	IWRG show	Hechicero Vs. El Hijo de Canis Lupus	
August 18, 2019	IWRG show	Blue Demon Jr., El Hijo de Canis Lupus, and Marshe Rockett vs. Demonio Infernal, El Mesías, and Máscara Año 2000 Jr.	
August 25, 2019	IWRG Show	Las Traumas (Trauma I and Trauma II) vs. Monsther Clown and Murder Clown vs. Apolo and Fresero Jr.	
August 28, 2019	IWRG Show	84. Torneo FILL	
September 1, 2019	IWRG Show	El Hijo de Canis Lupus (c) vs. Hechicero for the IWRG Intercontinental Heavyweight Championship	
September 16, 2019	IWRG Show	Dragón Bane (c) vs. Toxin for the IWRG Reyd el Aire Championship	
September 22, 2019	Mexico vs. La Legión Extranjera	Team Mexico (El Hijo del Alebrije, Imposible, Relámpago, Séptimo Dragón, Súper Nova, The Tiger) vs. La Legión Extranjera (Ave Rex, Heddi Karaoui, Hell Spawn, Hip Hop Man, La Mosca, and Zumbi)	
September 29, 2019	IWRG Show	Demonio Infernal (c) vs. Fresero Jr. for the IWRG Rey del Ring Championship	
October 13, 2019	IWRG Show	Las Traumas (Trauma I and Trauma II) vs. El Hijo de Dos Caras and El Hijo de Pirata Morgan vs. Capo del Norte and Capo del Sur	
October 27, 2019	IWRG Show	El Hijo de Canis Lupus (c) vs. Demonio Infernal for the IWRG Intercontinental Heavyweight Championship	
October 31, 2019	El Castillo del Terror	El Hijo de Canis Lupus vs. Ángel Tormenta vs. Ave Rex vs. Dragón Bane vs. Imposible vs. Dinamic Black vs. Toxin vs. Aramis vs. Relámpago vs. Capo del Norte vs. Tortuga Leo vs. Death Metal in the El Castillo del Terror, Luchas de Apuestas, Mask vs. Mask match	
November 3, 2019	AAA/IWRG Show	Team IWRG (Demonio Infernal, Fresero Jr., Imposible, Pirata Morgan, Súper Nova) vs. Team AAA (Argenis, Drago, Máximo, Monsther Clown, Murder Clown)	
November 20, 2019	IWRG Show	El Hijo de Dos Caras and Las Traumas (Trauma I and Trauma II) vs. Demonio Infernal and Los Piratas (El Hijo de Pirata Morgan and Pirata Morgan)	
November 24, 2019	IWRG Show	Toxin vs. Dragón Bane vs. Puma de Oro vs. Lunatik Xtreme	
December 1, 2019	PALL 1st Anniversary Show	Demonio Infernal vs. Fresero Jr., in a Lucha de Apuestas, hair vs. hair match	
December 15, 2019	57th Anniversary of Lucha Libre in Estado de México	L.A. Park vs. Blue Demon Jr.	
December 22, 2019	Ruleta de la Muerte Máscaras	Ketzal and Oficial 911 vs. Gato Negro and Warrior Jr. vs. Neza Kid Jr. and Freelance vs. Torito Negro and Toro Negro vs. Puma de Oro and Black Terry vs. Guerrero Olímpico and Dragón Fly, in a Maestro/Estudiante Ruleta de la Muerte tournament	

== See also ==
- 2019 in professional wrestling
