= List of IWRG shows in 2020 =

2020 International Wrestling Revolution Group

2020

International Wrestling Revolution Group shows chronology
← Previous; 2019	Next → 2021

The Mexican Lucha libre, or professional wrestling promotion International Wrestling Revolution Group (IWRG) has produced and scripted a number of wrestling shows since their creation on January 1, 1996 by promoter Adolfo "Pirata" Moreno. In 2020, IWRG will produce an indetermined number of shows, all held at Arena Naucalpan.

== 2020 events ==
Date	Event	Main Event	Ref.
January 1	Cinco Luchas en Jaula	Fuerza Guerrera Nueva Generacion vs. Pasion Cristal vs. Demonio Infernal vs. Ave Rex vs. Emperador Azteca vs. El Hijo del Alebrije in a Steel cage match for the "Briefcase of Glory" and the IWRG Intercontinental Middleweight Championship	
January 5	Dia de Reyes	Puma King, Fuerza Guerrera Nueva Generacion and Septimo Dragón vs. Demonio Infernal and Los Golpeladores (Dragón Bane and El Hijo de Canis Lupus)	
January 12	IWRG show	Fuerza Guerrera Next Generation, El Hijo de Pirata Morgan, and Relampago vs. Capo Del Norte, Demonio Infernal, and Shun Skywalker	
January 19	IWRG show	Strong Hearts (CIMA, El Lindaman, and T-Hawk) vs. Emperador Azteca, Súper Nova, and Toxin	
January 26	IWRG Show	Puma King and Séptimo Dragón vs Strong Hearts (CIMA and T-Hawk) vs. Los Golpeadores (Dragón Bane and El Hijo de Canis Lupus)	
January 29	IWRG Show	Gym Zeus vs. Gym Tepito	
February 9	IWRG Show	El Imperio (Chicano, Mamba, and Tiago) vs Strong Hearts (CIMA and T-Hawk)	
February 16	IWRG Show	Bandido and Fuerza Guerrera NG vs. Emperador Azteca and Toxin	
February 23	IWRG Show	Puma King, Relámpago, and Shun Skywalker vs. Demonio Infernal, Fuerza Guerrera NG, and Súper Nova	
March 1	IWRG Show	El Imperio (Chicano, Estrella Divina, and Tiago) vs. Emperador Azteca, Fuerza Guerrera NG, and Shun Skywalker	
March 5	IWRG Show	Los Strippers Big (Big Chico Che, Big Mike, and Big Ovett) vs. Demonio Infernal, Shun Skywalker, and X-Fly	
March 8	Dia de la Mujeres	Ayako Hamada, Lolita, and Miss Delicious vs. Diosa Quetzal, Hahastary, and Mary Caporal	
March 12	IWRG Show	Demonio Infernal, Fresero Jr., and Shun Skywalker vs. Jesse Ventura, Pasion Cristal, and Soy Raymunda	
March 16	IWRG Show	Herodes Jr., Hijo de Pirata Morgan, and Shun Skywalker vs. Diva Salvaje, Jessy Ventura, and Pasion Kristal (Empty arena show)	
June 14	Rey del Ring	Rey del Ring tournament	
August 23	Rey del Ring	Rey del Ring tournament	
August 30	Rey del Ring	Shun Skywalker vs. El Hijo de Canis Lupus in a Rey del Ring tournament final	
September 6	Rey del Ring	Demonio Infernal (c) vs. Shun Skywalker for the IWRG Rey del Ring Championship	
September 20	IWRG Show	Toxin (c) vs. Puma de Oro for the IWRG Mexican Championship	
(c) – denotes defending champion(s)

== See also ==
- 2020 in professional wrestling
