= OVW Anarchy Championship =

Details
- Promotion: Ohio Valley Wrestling
- Date established: April 27, 2018
- Date retired: 2023
Statistics
- First champion(s): Dapper Dan
- Final champion(s): Amon
- Most reigns: Amon & Shiloh Jonze (2 reigns)
- Longest reign: Amon (1140 days)
- Shortest reign: Mrs. Marvelous (<1 days)
- Oldest champion: Tommy Dreamer (47 years, 263 days)
- Youngest champion: Sam Thompson (19 years, 110 days)
- Heaviest champion: Dapper Dan (320 lbs)
- Lightest champion: Sam Thompson (175 lbs)

The OVW Anarchy Championship was a professional wrestling championship owned by the Ohio Valley Wrestling (OVW) promotion. The title was introduced on April 27, 2018, and was a Stipulations Championship, meaning that the current champion can create any stipulation for a match in which they defend. There have been a total of eleven reigns and one vacancy shared between nine different champions. The final champion was Amon who was in his second reign before the title was quietly retired.

== Title history ==
Key
| No. | Overall reign number |
| Reign | Reign number for the specific champion |
| Days | Number of days held |
| + | Current reign is changing daily |

| No. | Champion | Championship change | | | Reign statistics | | Notes | Ref. |
| No. | Champion | Date | Event | Location | Reign | Days | Notes | Ref. |
|---|---|---|---|---|---|---|---|---|
| 1 | Dapper Dan | April 27, 2018 | OVW Run for the Ropes 2018 | Louisville, KY | 1 | 96 | Dan defeated Tony Gunn to become the inaugural champion. | |
| 2 | Billy O | August 1, 2018 | OVW TV Tapings | Louisville, KY | 1 | 28 | This match was also for the OVW Television Championship. | |
| 3 | Sam Thompson | August 29, 2018 | OVW TV Tapings | Louisville, KY | 1 | 49 | This match was contested under the stipulation "No Hits to the Face". | |
| 4 | Shiloh Jonze | October 17, 2018 | OVW TV Tapings | Louisville, KY | 1 | 17 | This match was a Street Fight. | |
| 5 | Tommy Dreamer | November 3, 2018 | Saturday Night Special | Louisville, KY | 1 | 172 | David Lee Lorenze III served as the special guest referee. | |
| 6 | Shiloh Jonze | April 24, 2019 | OVW TV Tapings | Louisville, KY | 2 | 14 | Big Zo defended the championship for Tommy Dreamer who could not wrestle due to his Kentucky license expiring. | |
| 7 | Sinn Bodhi | May 8, 2019 | OVW TV Tapings | Louisville, KY | 1 | 174 | This was an empty arena match . | |
| 8 | Amon | October 29, 2019 | OVW TV Tapings | Louisville, KY | 1 | 273 | This was a House of Horrors match. | |
| — | Vacated | July 28, 2020 | OVW TV Tapings | Jeffersonville, IN | — | — | | |
| 9 | Melvin Maximus | August 4, 2020 | OVW TV Tapings | Jeffersonville, IN | 1 | 14 | This was a Rumble match. | |
| 10 | Mrs. Marvelous | August 18, 2020 | OVW TV Tapings | Jeffersonville, IN | 1 | <1 | Mrs. Marvelous became the first woman to win the OVW Anarchy Championship. | |
| 11 | Amon | August 18, 2020 | OVW TV Tapings | Jeffersonville, IN | 2 | 1,674 | Amon became the champion by pinning Mrs. Marvelous who laid down in the ring due to a trance in storyline, Title was quietly retired during his reign, therefore making Amon the final titleholder. | |

== Combined reigns ==
| Rank | Wrestler | No. of reigns | Combined days |
|---|---|---|---|
| 1 | Amon | 2 | 1,947 |
| 2 | Sinn Bodhi | 1 | 174 |
| 3 | Tommy Dreamer | 1 | 172 |
| 4 | Dapper Dan | 1 | 96 |
| 5 | Sam Thompson | 1 | 49 |
| 6 | Shiloh Jonze | 2 | 31 |
| 7 | Billy O | 1 | 28 |
| 8 | Melvin Maximus | 1 | 14 |
| 9 | Mrs. Marvelous | 1 | <1 |
