= El Protector (2019) =

2019 International Wrestling Revolution Group event

- Official poster showing all scheduled tournament participants
- Date: February 17, 2019
- City: Naucalpan, State of Mexico
- Venue: Arena Naucalpan

Event chronology
← Previous; Guerra de Dinastías	Next → Máscara vs. Cabellera

IWRG El Protector chronology
← Previous; 2017	Next → —

El Protector (2019) is a major lucha libre event produced and scripted by Mexican professional wrestling promotion International Wrestling Revolution Group (IWRG), which took place on January 31, 2016 at Arena Naucalpan, in Naucalpan, State of Mexico, Mexico; IWRG's main venue. The 2019 El Protector was thetenth annual event produced under that name. The focal point of the show was the El Protector tag team tournament where eight teams composed of a "rookie" and a "vet" team up to compete for as a way to showcase the "rookie" of the team.

The tournament was won by novato Death Metal and veteran Heddi Karaoui, who defeated Neza Kid and Cerebro Negro in the finals. As a result the team earned a future match for the IWRG Intercontinental Tag Team Championship, held by Los Oficiales (Oficial 911 and Oficial AK-47) at the time of the show. Beyond the eight El Protector matches the show featured three additional matches.

== Production ==
=== Background ===
Lucha Libre has a tradition for a tournament where a rookie, or novato, would be teamed up with an experienced veteran wrestler for a tag team tournament in the hopes of giving the Novato a chance to show case their talent and move up the ranks. Consejo Mundial de Lucha Libre has held a Torneo Gran Alternativa ("Great Alternative Tournament") almost every year since 1994, but the concept predates the creation of the Gran Alternativa. The Mexican professional wrestling company International Wrestling Revolution Group (IWRG; at times referred to as Grupo Internacional Revolución in Mexico) started their own annual rookie/veteran tournament in 2010. The first two tournaments were called Torneo Relampago de Proyeccion a Nuevas Promesas de la Lucha Libre (Spanish for "Projecting a new promise lightning tournament") but would be renamed the El Protector tournament in 2012. The El Protector shows, as well as the majority of the IWRG shows in general, are held in "Arena Naucalpan", owned by the promoters of IWRG and their main arena. The 2019 El Protector show was the tenth time that IWRG promoted a show around the rookie/veteran tournament, with the name changing to El Protector in 2012 and onwards.

=== Storylines ===
The event featured various professional wrestling matches with different wrestlers involved in pre-existing scripted feuds, plots and storylines. Wrestlers were portrayed as either heels (referred to as rudos in Mexico, those that portray the "bad guys") or faces (técnicos in Mexico, the "good guy" characters) as they followed a series of tension-building events, which culminated in a wrestling match or series of matches.

=== Tournament participants ===
- Ángel Tormenta (rookie) and Villano V Jr. (veteran)
- Brazo de Oro Jr. (rookie) and El Hijo de Canis Lupus (veteran)
- El Diablo Jr. (rookie) and Zumbi (veteran)
- Death Metal (rookie) and Heddi Karaoui (veteran)
- Dranzer (rookie) and Rokambole Jr. (veteran)
- Latino (rookie) and Pitbull (veteran)
- Neza Kid (rookie) and Cerebro Negro (veteran)
- Puma de Oro (rookie) and Black Terry (veteran)

== Results ==
No.	Results	Stipulations
1	Ángel Estrelar Jr. defeated Chicanito	Singles match
2	Apolo Estrada Jr., Hip Hop Man and La Mosca defeated Eragon, Auzten and Yakuza	Six-man tag team match
3	Sinn Bodhi defeated Pasion Kristal	Singles match
4	Diablo Jr. and Puma de Oro defeated Ángel Tormenta, Brazo de Oro Jr., Death Metal, vs. Latino, Neza Kid	El Protector 2019 seeding battle royal
5	Ángel Tormenta and Villano V Jr. defeated Dranzer and Rokambole Jr.	El Protector 2019 first round match
6	Death Metal and Heddi Karaoui defeated Latino and Pitbull	El Protector 2019 first round match
7	Neza Kid and Cerebro Negro defeated Brazo de Oro Jr. and El Hijo de Canis Lupus	El Protector 2019 first round match
8	Puma de Oro and Black Terry defeated El Diablo Jr. and Zumbi	El Protector 2019 first round match
9	Death Metal and Heddi Karaoui defeated Ángel Tormenta and Villano V Jr.	El Protector 2019 semi-final match
10	Neza Kid and Cerebro Negro defeated Puma de Oro and Black Terry	El Protector 2019 semi-final match
