= IWRG Zona de Ejecucion (2019) =

2019 International Wrestling Revolution Group event

- Post of the event featuring all 16 competitors in the main event
- Date: January 20, 2019
- City: Naucalpan, State of Mexico
- Venue: Arena Naucalpan

Event chronology
← Previous; IWRG 23rd Anniversary Show	Next → Guerra de Dinastías

Zona de Ejecucion chronology
← Previous; July 2018	Next → —

The Zona de Ejecucion (2019) (Spanish for "Elimination Zone") is a major lucha libre event produced and scripted by Mexican Lucha Libre, or professional wrestling promotion, International Wrestling Revolution Group (IWRG). The show was held on January 20, 2019 at Arena Naucalpan in Naucalpan, State of Mexico, Mexico; which is IWRG's main arena. The show was the third time IWRG held the eponymous Zona de Ejecucion match, after having held one in January and one in June of 2018.

For the main event, Zona de Ejecucion matches four teams of four faced off in an elimination match. Each team was represented in the ring by a select team member, once he was eliminated another person from that team could enter the ring until only one person or team was left. The team of Dragon Bane, El Hijo de Canis Lupus, Septiemo Rayo and Ultimo Gladiador defeated the teams of El Hijo del Medico Asesino, Eterno, Trauma I, Trauma II; Aramís, Dinamic Black, Imposible and International Pantera; and Demasio, Oscar el Hermoso, Pasion Kristal, and Soy Raymunda. Dragon Bane became the sole survivor of the match when he eliminated Cerebro Negro as the final opponent.

== Storylines ==
The event featured five professional wrestling matches with different wrestlers involved in pre-existing scripted feuds, plots and storylines. Wrestlers were portrayed as either heels (referred to as rudos in Mexico, those that portray the "bad guys") or faces (técnicos in Mexico, the "good guy" characters) as they followed a series of tension-building events, which culminated in a wrestling match or series of matches.

== Results ==
No.	Results	Stipulations
1	Atomic Star and Toto defeated Guero Palma and Neza Kid	Tag team match
2	Black Dragon, Black Terry and Gato de Estapec defeated Death Metal and Las Tortugas Negras (Ra-Zhata and Shil-Kah)	Six-man tag team match
3	El Demonio Eterno (Demonio Infernal, Eterno, and Lunatik Xreme) defeated Los Oficiales Elite (Oficial Liderk and Oficial Spartan) and Ripper	Super Libre six-man tag team match
4	Multifacetico defeated Multifacetico 2.0	Singles match
5	Dragon Bane, El Hijo de Canis Lupus, Septiemo Rayo, and Ultimo Gladiador defeated Cerebro Negro and Los Oficiales (Oficial 911, Oficial AK-47 and Oficial Fierro); Aramís, Dinamic Black, Imposible, and International Pantera; Demasio, Oscar el Hermoso, Pasion Kristal, and Soy Raymunda	4-team Zona de Ejecucion elimination match
