= Festival de las Máscaras (2018) =

2018 International Wrestling Revolution Group event

- Official poster for the event, honoring Mano Negra
- Date: June 17, 2018
- City: Naucalpan, State of Mexico
- Venue: Arena Naucalpan

Event chronology
← Previous; Cabellera vs. Cabellera	Next → Cabellera vs. Cabellera

IWRG Festival de las Máscaras chronology
← Previous; 2017	Next → 2019

The Festival de las Máscaras (2018) (Spanish for "Festival of the Masks") was a major annual lucha libre event produced and scripted by the Mexican International Wrestling Revolution Group (IWRG) professional wrestling promotion held on June 17, 2018. The show was held in Arena Naucalpan, Naucalpan, State of Mexico, which is IWRG's primary venue. For the 2018 event Máscara Año 2000, Cocco Rojo, Olímpico, Mano Negra, Veneno, Star Boy, El Pantera II, Dr. Cerebro, Cerebro Negro, Oficial 911, Oficial AK-47 and Oficial Fierro, Mega and Omega, El Hijo del Diablo and El Golpeador all wore their masks again after having lost Luchas de Apuestas, or "bet matches", in the past and thus lost the rights to wear their mask.

The main event of the show featured Consejo Mundial de Lucha Libre (CMLL) main-stays the Muñoz brothers Rush and Dragon Lee facing off against the father/son team of L.A. Park and El Hijo de L.A. Park as part of a long-running rivalry between the two families, that has played out not only in CMLL but on various independent promotion shows across Mexico. On the night L.A. Park and his son won the match. The show featured six additional matches.

== Production ==
=== Background ===
The wrestling mask has always held a sacred place in lucha libre, carrying with it a mystique and anonymity beyond what it means to wrestlers elsewhere in the world. The ultimate humiliation a luchador can suffer is to lose a Lucha de Apuestas, or bet match. Following a loss in a Lucha de Apuesta match the masked wrestler would be forced to unmask, state their real name and then would be unable to wear that mask while wrestling anywhere in Mexico. Since 2007 the Mexican wrestling promotion International Wrestling Revolution Group (IWRG; Sometimes referred to as Grupo Internacional Revolución in Spanish) has held a special annual show where they received a waiver to the rule from the State of Mexico Wrestling Commission and wrestlers would be allowed to wear the mask they previously lost in a Lucha de Apuestas.

The annual IWRG Festival de las Máscaras ("Festival of the Masks") event is also partly a celebration or homage of lucha libre history with IWRG honoring wrestlers of the past at the events similar to Consejo Mundial de Lucha Libre's (CMLL) Homenaje a Dos Leyendas ("Homage to Two Legends") annual shows. The IWRG's Festival de las Máscaras shows, as well as the majority of their major IWRG shows in general, are held in Arena Naucalpan, owned by the promoters of IWRG and is their main venue. The 2018 Festival de las Máscaras show was the eleventh year in a row IWRG held the show.

=== Storylines ===
The event featured five professional wrestling matches with different wrestlers involved in pre-existing scripted feuds, plots and storylines. Wrestlers were portrayed as either heels (referred to as rudos in Mexico, those that portray the "bad guys") or faces (técnicos in Mexico, the "good guy" characters) as they followed a series of tension-building events, which culminated in a wrestling match or series of matches.

== Results ==
No.	Results	Stipulations
1	Avisman defeated Atomic Star	Best two-out-of-three-falls match
2	Black Dragon and Zatura defeated Demonio Infernal and X-Fly	Best two-out-of-three-falls tag team match
3	El Golpeador, El Hijo del Diablo and Eterno defeated El Hijo del Alebrije, Hijo del Olimpico and Mano Negra Jr.	Best two-out-of-three-falls six-man tag team match
4	Los Oficiales (Oficial 911, Oficial AK-47 and Oficial Fierro) defeated El Hijo de Canis Lupus, Mega and Omega and Guardia, Oficial and Xibalba	Three-way tag team match
5	Los Terribles Cerebros (Cerebro Negro and Dr. Cerebro) and Maniacop defeated El Pantera II, Star Boy and Veneno	Best two-out-of-three-falls six-man tag team match
6	El Fantasma, Mano Negra and Olímpico defeated Cocco Rojo, Enterrador 2000 and Máscara Año 2000	Best two-out-of-three-falls six-man tag team match
7	El Hijo de L.A. Park and L.A. Park defeated Dragon Lee and Rush	Best two-out-of-three-falls tag team match
