= IWRG Zona de Ejecucion (July 2018) =

2018 International Wrestling Revolution Group event

Zona de Ejecucion (July 2018)
- Official poster showing the main event competitors
- Date: July 22, 2018
- City: Naucalpan, State of Mexico
- Venue: Arena Naucalpan

Event chronology
← Previous; Cabellera vs. Cabellera	Next → IWRG Ejecucion Total

Zona de Ejecucion chronology
← Previous; February 2018	Next → 2019

The Zona de Ejecucion (July 2018) (Spanish for "Elimination Zone") was a major lucha libre event produced and scripted by Mexican Lucha Libre, or professional wrestling promotion, International Wrestling Revolution Group (IWRG). The show was held on January 7, 2018 in Arena Naucalpan, Naucalpan, State of Mexico, Mexico, IWRG's main arena. The show was the second time IWRG held the eponymous Zona de Ejecucion match, after having held the first Zona de Ejecucion in January 2018.

For the main event Zona de Ejecucion match four teams of four faced off in an elimination match. Each team was represented in the ring by a select team member, once he was eliminated another person from that team could enter the ring until only one person or team was left. The team of El Hijo del Medico Asesino, Eterno, Trauma I, Trauma II defeated the teams of Leo, Mike, Rafy, Relámpago / Dr. Cerebro, El Hijo de Canis Lupus, Pantera, Veneno / Emperador Azteca, Freelance, El Hijo del Alebrije, Imposible. The match was won when Trauma II eliminating Dr. Cerebro to become the only survivor. The show featured five additional matches.

== Storylines ==
The event featured five professional wrestling matches with different wrestlers involved in pre-existing scripted feuds, plots and storylines. Wrestlers were portrayed as either heels (referred to as rudos in Mexico, those that portray the "bad guys") or faces (técnicos in Mexico, the "good guy" characters) as they followed a series of tension-building events, which culminated in a wrestling match or series of matches.

== Results ==
No.	Results	Stipulations
1	Atomic Star defeated Angel Estrella Jr.	Best two-out-of-three-falls match
2	Death Metal and Douki defeated Mexica and Shaolin	Best two-out-of-three-falls tag team match
3	Los Tortugas Negras (Ra-Zhata, Shil-Kah and Teelo) defeated Los Comandos Elite (Oficial Factor, Oficial Liderk and Oficial Spector) by disqualification	Best two-out-of-three-falls six-man tag team match
4	Capo del Norte, Demonio Infernal and Diablo Jr. defeated Black Dragon, Danny Casas and Pasion Crystal	Best two-out-of-three-falls six-man tag team match
5	Lunatic Extreme and Obett defeated El Hijo de X-Fly and X-Fly	Best two-out-of-three-falls tag team match
6	Las Traumas (Trauma I and Trauma II), El Hijo del Medico Asesino and Eterno defeated Los Tortugas Ninjas (Leo, Mike and Rafy) and Relampago and El Hijo del Alebrije, Emperador Azteca, Freelance and Imposible and Dr. Cerebro, El Hijo de Canis Lupus, El Pantera II and Veneno	Zona de Ejecucion elimination match
