= Tommy Dreamer =

American professional wrestler and promoter (born 1971)

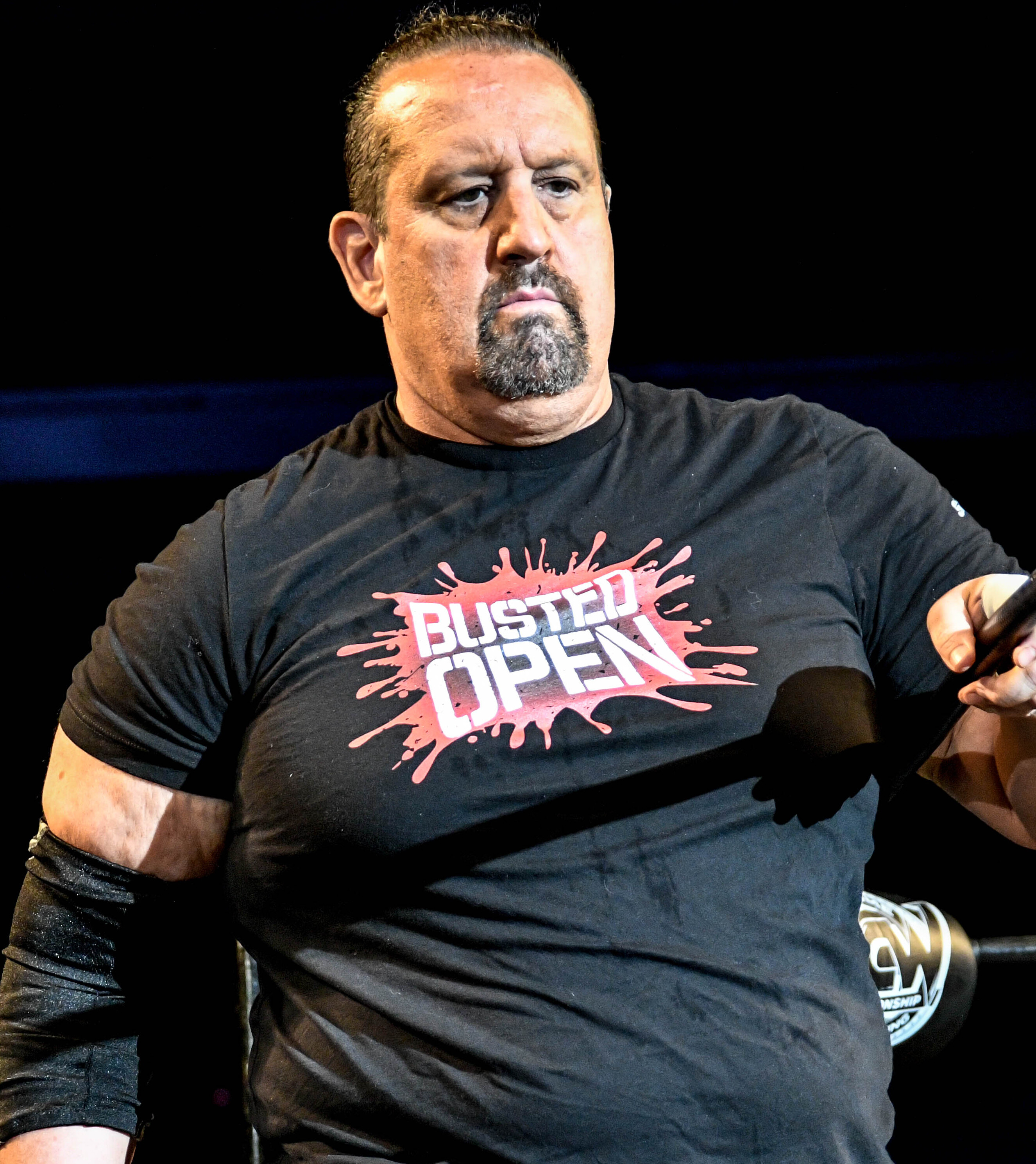
- Dreamer in 2025

Personal information
- Born: Thomas James Laughlin; February 13, 1971 (age 55) Yonkers, New York, U.S.
- Spouse: Beulah McGillicutty (m. 2002)
- Children: 2
- Website: www.houseofhardcore.net

Professional wrestling career
- Ring name(s): T.D. Madison; Tommy Dreamer
- Billed height: 6 ft 2 in (1.88 m)
- Billed weight: 265 lb (120 kg)
- Billed from: "Dreamland, USA"; Yonkers, New York
- Trained by: Johnny Rodz
- Debut: October 29, 1989

Thomas James Laughlin (born February 13, 1971), better known by the ring name Tommy Dreamer, is an American professional wrestler and promoter.

Dreamer is best known for his tenures with Extreme Championship Wrestling (ECW) in the 1990s and early 2000s and with World Wrestling Entertainment (WWE) (previously the World Wrestling Federation (WWF)), primarily from 2001 to 2010. During this time, he held numerous championships including, the ECW World Heavyweight Championship (which he held twice, being the only man to capture the title in both the original ECW and WWE's ECW brand). He has also held the ECW World Tag Team Championship and WWF/E Hardcore Championship. Dubbed the "heart and soul" of ECW, Dreamer regularly featured in prominent storylines for the promotion as well as holding many back office roles.

Dreamer has also appeared in notable promotions such as Impact Wrestling/TNA Wrestling, Ring of Honor (ROH), and AAA. After departing from WWE in 2010, Dreamer joined Total Nonstop Action Wrestling and was a part of an ECW-inspired stable known as EV 2.0. In 2012, Dreamer started his wrestling promotion called House of Hardcore, named in honor of ECW's former wrestling school of the same name. Since then, Dreamer has made sporadic appearances with WWE in 2012, 2015, and 2016, as well as wrestling on the independent circuit.

== Professional wrestling career ==
=== Early career (1989–1993) ===
Laughlin was trained in professional wrestling by Johnny Rodz. His first notable foray into the business came when he worked in International World Class Championship Wrestling (IWCCW) under the name T.D. Madison. While there, he and his storyline brother, G.Q., held the IWCCW Tag Team Championship three times in 1991. He changed his name to Tommy Dreamer, reportedly after taking his given first name, and adding "Dreamer" in tribute to Dusty Rhodes, in 1992 while working in the New England based Century Wrestling Alliance (CWA). While in the CWA, he became its first Heavyweight Champion by defeating "Mr. USA" Tony Atlas in a tournament final held in Wallingford, Connecticut, on November 5, 1992. He held the title for over four months (March 1993) before losing it to The Iron Sheik in Burlington, Vermont. On August 17, 1993, Tommy Dreamer wrestled a dark match at a WWF Superstars taping in White Plains, NY, losing to The Brooklyn Brawler.

=== NWA Eastern/Extreme Championship Wrestling (1993–2001) ===
==== Early appearances (1993–1994) ====
Dreamer joined Extreme Championship Wrestling (ECW) in October 1993 at NWA Bloodfest. His first major gimmick in the company had him wrestling in matches in garish green suspenders and acting as something of a "pretty boy" – at least about the rest of the ECW roster. This gimmick got him soundly booed by crowds, even when he became the first person in wrestling history to kick out of the pin that follows the Superfly Splash of Jimmy "Superfly" Snuka at The Night the Line Was Crossed. He teamed with Johnny Gunn to capture the ECW Tag Team Championships. They captured the titles from Johnny Hotbody and Tony Stetson in only nine seconds. Less than a month later, the pair would lose the titles to The Tazmaniac (later Taz) and Kevin Sullivan. Gunn suffered an injury and was replaced with Shane Douglas for a night, who turned on Dreamer to cost them the tag belts.

==== Feud with the Sandman (1994–1995) ====
After Michael Fay was arrested in Singapore and sentenced to a caning, ECW head booker Paul Heyman decided to capitalize on the publicity by holding a Singapore Cane match between Dreamer and the Sandman – with the loser having to take ten lashes. After losing the match, Dreamer took his lashes, then asked the Sandman for another, causing the crowd to feel sympathy for him as he took the extra and another. This was a launching point to an angle that ended up blurring the divide between faces and heels in wrestling, as well as start a new way of working the fans, especially the "smarks" – fans with some amount of inside information. In a later match, Dreamer kayfabe accidentally blinded the Sandman, first by knocking a lit cigarette into his eye, then hitting the other with a Singapore cane. Immediately after, Dreamer seemed to break kayfabe and started aiding the Sandman. He professed that he "didn't mean to do it" and that it was "an accident" as other wrestlers – face and heel – swarmed out to help. The feud continued with Sandman planning to announce his retirement at an ECW show, only to attack Dreamer and reveal he was never actually blind. The feud ended when Dreamer defeated the Sandman in a No DQ/No-Holds-Barred match.

==== Feud with Raven (1995–1997) ====
Though the blind Sandman angle was his first "major" feud in ECW, his later, years-long feud against Raven that started in January 1995 is arguably his most memorable. The two were portrayed as childhood friends who had been competing in different ways their entire lives. Raven's entrance into ECW had him accompanied by Beulah McGillicutty, an overweight girl from their kayfabe childhood who had a crush on Dreamer and was now a Penthouse Pet. Dreamer and Raven (and Raven's Nest) feuded for two years, with Dreamer never getting a win over Raven until Raven's last match in ECW, and a Loser Leaves Town match at Wrestlepalooza 1997. During the feud, Beulah had left Raven and was Tommy's valet.

Throughout 1996, during the feud with Raven, Dreamer was also involved in an additional feud with "Prime Time" Brian Lee, who was brought in as Raven's bodyguard. The two had several encounters that ended with Dreamer being chokeslammed through tables. During other fights, the pair brawled outdoors onto the street and into traffic. The feud culminated in a scaffold match at High Incident in October 1996, where Dreamer sent Lee off the scaffolding through several tables in the ring below. On February 24, 1997, Dreamer appeared on WWF Monday Night Raw defeating D-Von Dudley during ECW's invasion in WWF.

==== Various feuds (1997–2001) ====
After Raven went to World Championship Wrestling, Dreamer began a feud with the World Wrestling Federation's Jerry "The King" Lawler. The feud was largely symbolic, with Dreamer representing Extreme Championship Wrestling's "new school" style of wrestling as a concept and Lawler (with James E. Cornette) representing the World Wrestling Federation and United States Wrestling Association's more "old school" way of doing things.

In 1998, Dreamer had a short feud with Dudley Boyz (Buh Buh Ray and D-Von), during which they "broke" Beulah's neck. In August 1999 at the Last Show at the Madhouse, on their last night in the company, they cited this incident to get Dreamer to accept a challenge for the ECW Tag Team Championship they had won earlier in the night. He did accept, and got the title, but was paired with the unexpected partner Raven, who slid into the ring at the last second and made the pin. The team only lasted a short time before it dissolved, with Raven taking the title and choosing Mike Awesome as his new partner. He also, begrudgingly, became World Heavyweight Champion in 2000 by beating Tazz at CyberSlam, only to lose it to Justin Credible just 30 minutes later.

When speaking of his title reigns on The Rise and Fall of ECW documentary produced by WWE Home Video, Dreamer is quoted as saying:

I was actually pissed off. I wanted to go my entire ECW career without winning titles. The only reason I won titles is because guys left.

Dreamer stayed with ECW until it folded in 2001, defeating C. W. Anderson in an "I Quit" match at Guilty as Charged – the final pay-per-view – and teaming with Danny Doring in a win over Julio Dinero and E. Z. Money in the final independent ECW show.

=== Independent circuit (2001, 2004–2006) ===
After ECW closed its doors, Dreamer spent time in various independent leagues throughout the country, such as Jersey All Pro Wrestling and Combat Zone Wrestling. He worked for Border City Wrestling in Windsor, Ontario where he won the vacated BCW Can-Am Heavyweight Championship, defeating Scott D'Amore and former ECW alumnus Rhino in a three-way match on March 7, 2001. Dreamer dropped the title to D'Amore on April 18. He lost to UPW Heavyweight Champion Samoa Joe on April 25 in Santa Ana, California for Ultimate Pro Wrestling. On July 8, Dreamer defeated CW Anderson for the main event at ECW Reunion Show in Lancaster, New York. Afterwards, Dreamer went to the WWF.

After leaving the WWE (former WWF) in January 2004, he returned to the independents mainly in New York (state). On November 21, 2004, he defeated A-1 at Border City Wrestling in Windsor, Canada. Dreamer fought in a Raven's Rules Triple Threat match against Raven, which was won by The Sandman on October 1, 2005 in Doncaster, England for 1 Pro Wrestling. On November 26, 2005, he teamed with Balls Mahoney in a three-way tag match won by the New Age Outlaws (Billy Gunn and Road Dogg) which featured Steve Corino and Ricky Landell for USA Xtreme Wrestling in old Bethpage, New York. That same night, he fought Steve Corino in a no-contest. Dreamer then wrestled in battel royal in England in February 2006 won by Charile Rage. On March 16, 2006, Dreamer defeated former ECW alumnus Danny Doring for East Coast Pro Wrestling in Suffern, New York, with special guest referee Nunzio. On April 29, 2006, Dreamer teamed with The Sandman as they lost to Raven and Sabu at TNT Hog-A-Mania in Staunton, Virginia.

=== World Wrestling Federation/Entertainment (2001–2004, 2005–2010) ===
==== The Alliance (2001–2002) ====
He signed with the World Wrestling Federation (WWF) and was introduced to WWF audiences on the July 9, 2001, episode of Raw as a member of the WCW/ECW Alliance during the Invasion angle. When the angle ended in November, Dreamer was sent to the WWF's "farm territory" Heartland Wrestling Association.

==== Hardcore Champion and Heat mainstay (2002–2004) ====
He was brought back to the main roster of the WWF (later renamed World Wrestling Entertainment) in March 2002 and placed on the Raw brand. There, he turned face and was given a gimmick that saw him proclaim that he was "Just a Regular Guy", for which he was featured in vignettes and backstage segments showing him in normal situations that were then augmented by "disgusting" antics such as brushing his teeth and his dog's teeth with the same brush and eating food from the floor. However, this angle was short-lived. He soon reverted to his "Innovator of Violence" gimmick in the summer and amassed fourteen reigns as Hardcore Champion. During this time, he was the final person to hold it before it became unified with the Intercontinental Championship in a match with Rob Van Dam at Madison Square Garden. After losing the Hardcore Championship, Dreamer renewed his feud with Raven, defeating him in a Loser Leaves Raw match on June 24 to send him to Raw's sister show, Heat. Dreamer (with a variety of partners) would feud in the fall with Lance Storm and William Regal as he sought revenge for his jaw being broken. Dreamer competed in his first Royal Rumble match at the Royal Rumble on January 19, 2003, bringing weapons with him and breaking Bill DeMott's hand during the match.

As 2003 and 2004 went on, Dreamer was used less and less on WWE television, and they began allowing him to take independent bookings and work as color commentator for their developmental territories, Ohio Valley Wrestling, Deep South Wrestling and on occasion Heat. He was taken off the main roster in January 2004. When his performer's contract expired, he took a succession of office jobs inside World Wrestling Entertainment, including being the number two person in Talent Relations. During this time he continued to work in the independents, England and Ohio Valley Wrestling.

==== ECW Original (2005–2007) ====
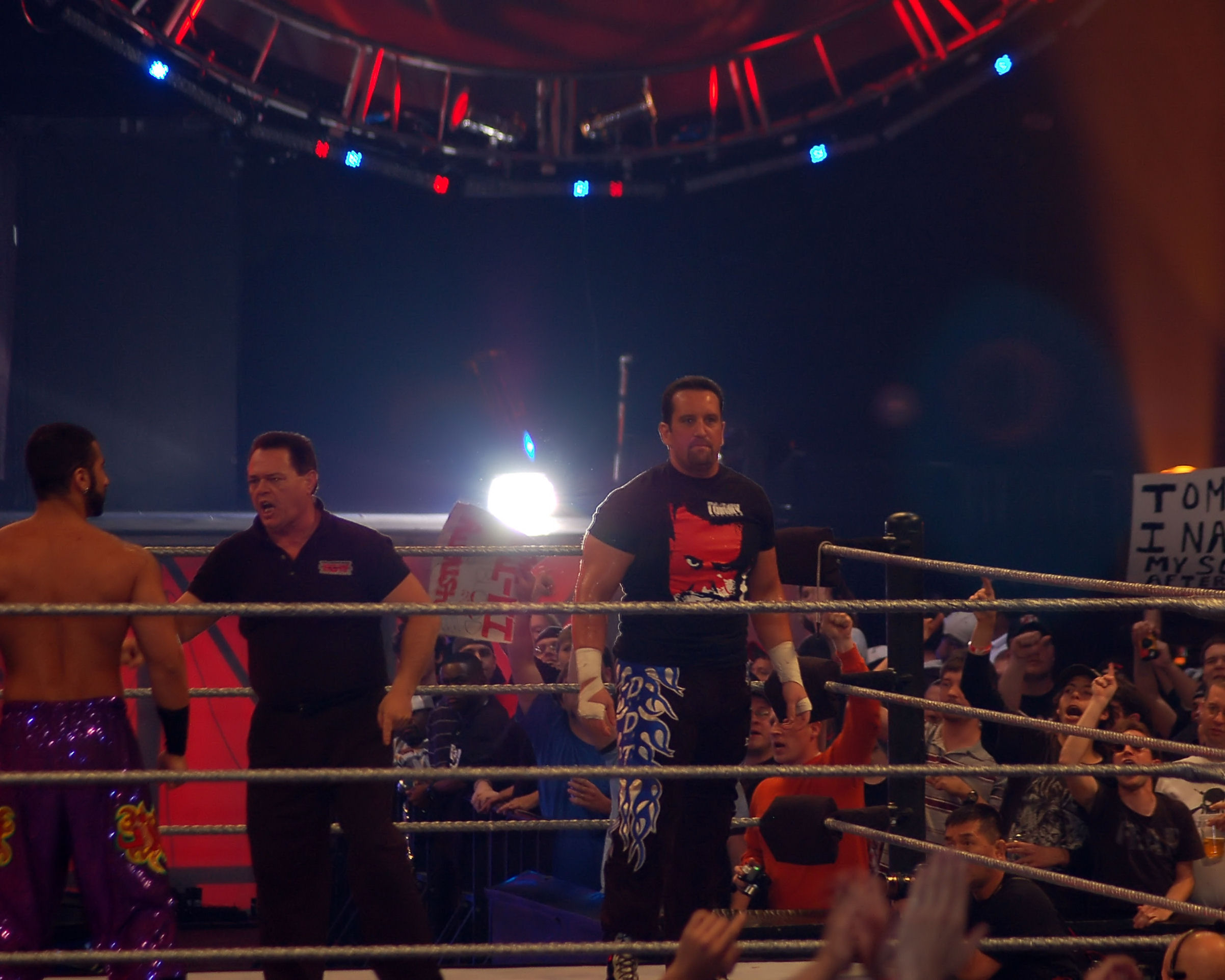
Dreamer in 2006 December to Dismember

On June 12, 2005, Dreamer was a major part of the ECW One Night Stand reunion show pay-per-view held under the World Wrestling Entertainment banner. He, along with a number of former ECW stars, took part in promotional hype for the event on episodes of Raw and, with The Sandman, he wrestled the Dudley Boyz in the main event. For the second ECW One Night Stand on June 11, 2006, he was placed into an angle that had him and Terry Funk – who had been his "mentor" in the early days of the original ECW – at odds with then-heels, Mick Foley and Edge over the meanings of "extreme". The angle ended with a six-person-intergender-tag team match at ECW One Night Stand where Dreamer, Funk, and Beulah McGillicutty lost to Edge, Foley, and Lita.

When the ECW brand officially launched on the Sci Fi channel, Dreamer and the Sandman were put into one of the brands first feuds, an "old school versus new school" feud, against Test and Mike Knox. In November and December he engaged in a short feud with Daivari and The Great Khali, but Khali was sent to the Raw brand before it could come to a conclusion. Not long after Khali left ECW, The New Breed stable was established, consisting of wrestlers new to ECW: Elijah Burke, Marcus Cor Von, Matt Striker and Kevin Thorn. In response, a stable of ECW Originals was created, and the teams continued to clash in singles and tag matches, trading wins on the weekly ECW show throughout the spring of 2007, while both sides tried to get CM Punk to side with them. The Originals won a standard-rules four-on-four match at WrestleMania 23 on April 1, which would be Dreamer's first and only match ever on the main card of a WrestleMania. The Originals lost an extreme-rules rematch on the following episode of ECW. The feud continued until a number of roster moves left both sides nearly barren, with it ending at One Night Stand on June 3 when Dreamer, Sandman, and Punk beat Burke, Cor Von, and Striker in a Tables match.

==== ECW Championship pursuits (2007–2008) ====
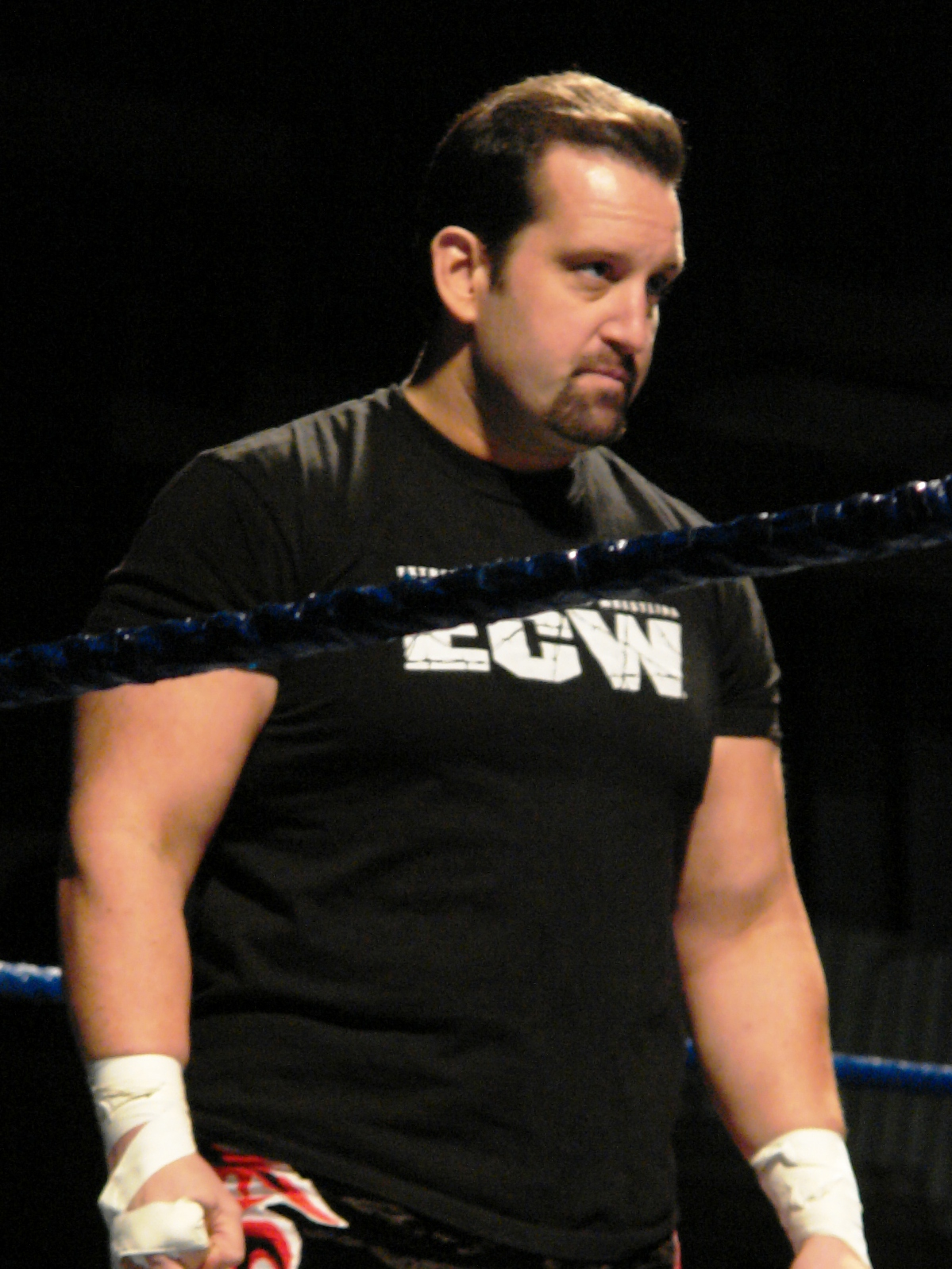
Dreamer in 2008

In late 2007, Dreamer took part in the ECW brand's elimination chase to name a number one contender to the ECW Championship. During the series of matches, also involving Stevie Richards, Elijah Burke, and Kevin Thorn he added a bandana, worn on his head, to his ring gear. He received the original one from a young boy with a brain tumor, and from then on began wearing one as a sign of solidarity and strength to anyone going through that struggle. Dreamer emerged victorious in the final match against Burke, only to be surprised by ECW's general manager Armando Estrada forcing him to face Big Daddy V, who promptly beat him for the number one contenders.

In early 2008, Dreamer would have one of his career highlights. Despite not being featured on television leading up to the Royal Rumble, Dreamer would receive a loud ovation and chants from his hometown MSG crowd even with Shawn Michaels and The Undertaker in the match. In February, Dreamer was paired with ECW brand enhancement talent Colin Delaney as a sort of mentor after Delaney was consistently and easily defeated on the weekly ECW television show. They challenged John Morrison and the Miz for the WWE Tag Team Championship after they defeated them in a non-title match, but they lost the title match in an Extreme rules match in March. At WrestleMania XXIV, he participated in a pre-show 24-man battle royal to earn an opportunity for the ECW Championship in the event, a match that was won by Kane. Dreamer qualified for the five-way Singapore cane match at One Night Stand to determine a number one contender for the championship; Big Show would win the match.

Following Mark Henry's ECW Championship win at Night of Champions, Dreamer was named his first challenger. At The Great American Bash, Dreamer was defeated by Henry for the championship after Colin Delaney turned on him and cost him the match. On the following ECW, Dreamer defeated Delaney and again on August 12, 2008, in an Extreme Rules grudge match which would be Delaney's final match in the WWE. Dreamer then turned his attention to the debuting Jack Swagger, who made disparaging remarks about Dreamer and ECW. They first faced off in an amateur wrestling match, which Dreamer was disqualified from for using his DDT on Swagger. Then Swagger defeated Dreamer in an Extreme Rules match, ending the feud.

==== ECW Champion and departure (2009–2010) ====
On the January 13, 2009 episode of ECW, Dreamer announced that if he failed to win the ECW Championship by June 6, when his WWE contract was to expire, he would no longer wrestle for ECW. The storyline saw Dreamer start a losing streak that ended when he defeated Paul Burchill on the February 24 episode of ECW. On the April 28 episode of ECW, Dreamer received a match for the ECW Championship against then-champion Christian, which went to a no-contest when Jack Swagger interfered. On the May 21 episode of Superstars Dreamer had another title match with Christian which once again went to a no contest when Swagger interfered, believing he ruined Dreamer's last title chance. Dreamer was granted a one-day extension on his contract, allowing him one last chance at the ECW Championship, challenging the champion Christian and Jack Swagger in a triple threat match at Extreme Rules, where Dreamer pinned Jack Swagger in a hardcore triple threat match, capturing his second ECW Championship almost a decade after he claimed the title in the original ECW, being the only man to hold the belt in the original ECW and in the ECW brand of WWE.

After successfully defending the title against Christian on the June 15 episode of Raw, Dreamer successfully defended the title in a Championship Scramble match at The Bash, before eventually losing the title back to Christian at Night of Champions. On the July 28 episode of ECW, Dreamer announced he would exercise his rematch clause against Christian the following week. The two faced off in an Extreme Rules match, in which Christian retained the championship.

After his championship pursuit had ceased, Dreamer began teaming up with Christian, Yoshi Tatsu and Goldust on various occasions to take on William Regal and his allies Vladimir Kozlov and Ezekiel Jackson, exchanging victories and losses. On the December 29 episode of ECW, Dreamer wrestled Zack Ryder and lost. If Dreamer was to lose the match then he would be (kayfabe) forced to retire from in-ring competition. After the match, Dreamer made a farewell speech in which he thanked the fans before exiting the ring with his two daughters. A few days later on January 4, 2010, Dreamer was officially released by WWE, ending an eight-year tenure with the company.

=== Total Nonstop Action Wrestling (2010–2011) ===
==== EV 2.0 (2010–2011) ====
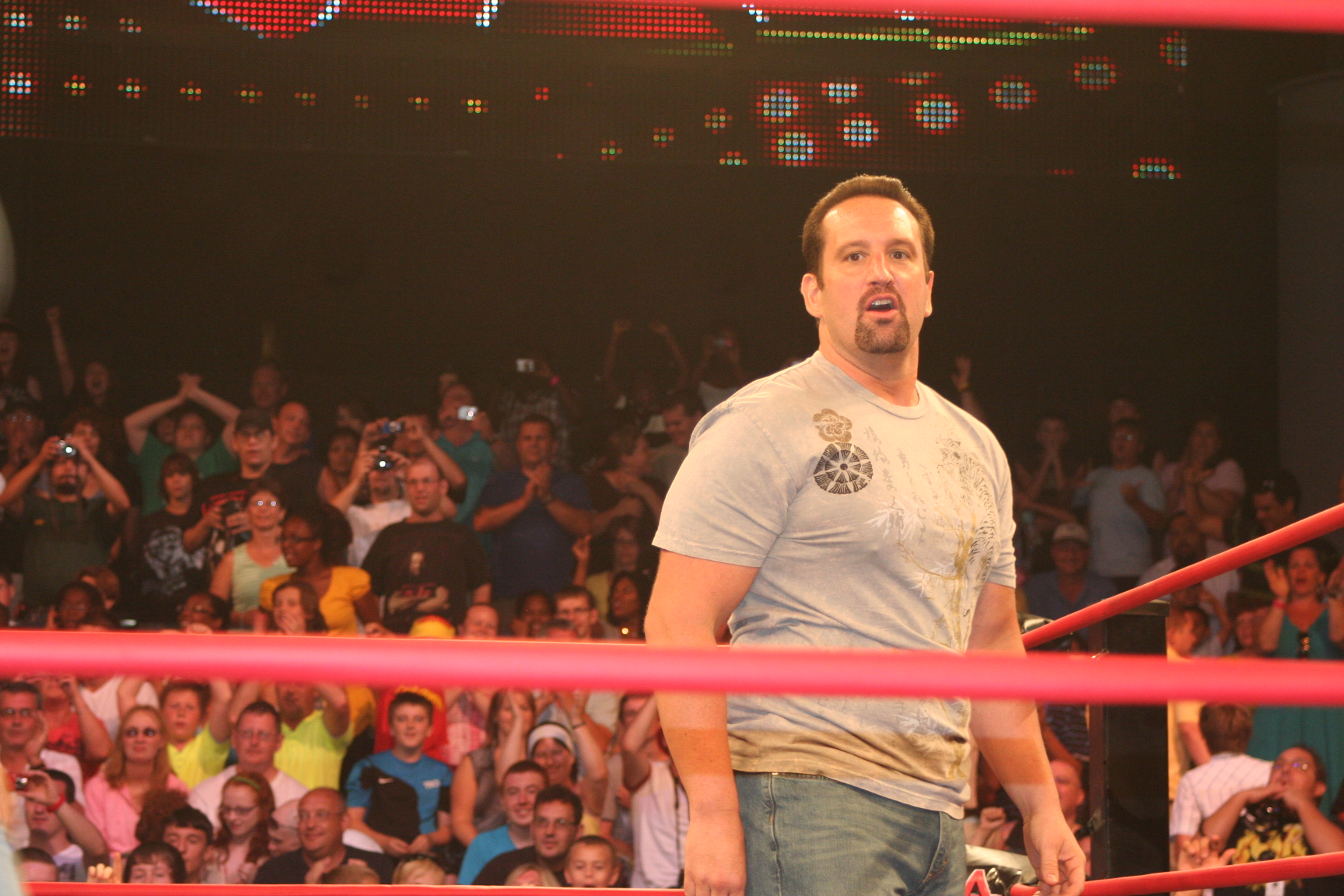
Dreamer at a TNA Impact! television taping in 2010

On June 13, 2010, at Slammiversary VIII Dreamer made his debut for Total Nonstop Action Wrestling (TNA), appearing in the crowd and thus distracting Brother Ray and costing him his match against Jesse Neal. On the June 24 episode of Impact! Dreamer appeared in the crowd of the Impact! Zone, beside fellow ECW alumni Raven and Stevie Richards. The following week the three were joined by Rhino. On the July 15 episode of Impact!, Dreamer, Raven, Richards, Rhino, Brother Devon, Pat Kenney and Al Snow, led by Mick Foley, aligned themselves with the TNA World Heavyweight Champion Rob Van Dam by attacking Abyss and the rest of the TNA locker room. The following week, TNA president Dixie Carter agreed to give the ECW alumni their own reunion pay–per–view event, Hardcore Justice: The Last Stand, as a celebration of hardcore wrestling and a final farewell to the company, while also placing Dreamer in charge of the show. Dreamer made his TNA in–ring debut on the July 29 episode of Impact!, losing to Abyss in a No Disqualification match. After the match Raven reignited his old feud with Dreamer by turning on him, laying him out with a DDT on a chair, and licking his face. The following week Raven explained his turn by saying that he had not forgotten how Dreamer had "stolen" his girlfriend Beulah McGillicutty back in 1996; also on that show Dreamer teamed with Van Dam to beat Abyss and Raven. On August 8 at Hardcore Justice, Dreamer was defeated by Raven in a "Final Showdown" (Final Singles match) match refereed by Mick Foley and featuring appearances by Beulah McGillicutty, "Lupus", The Blue Meanie and Hollywood Nova.

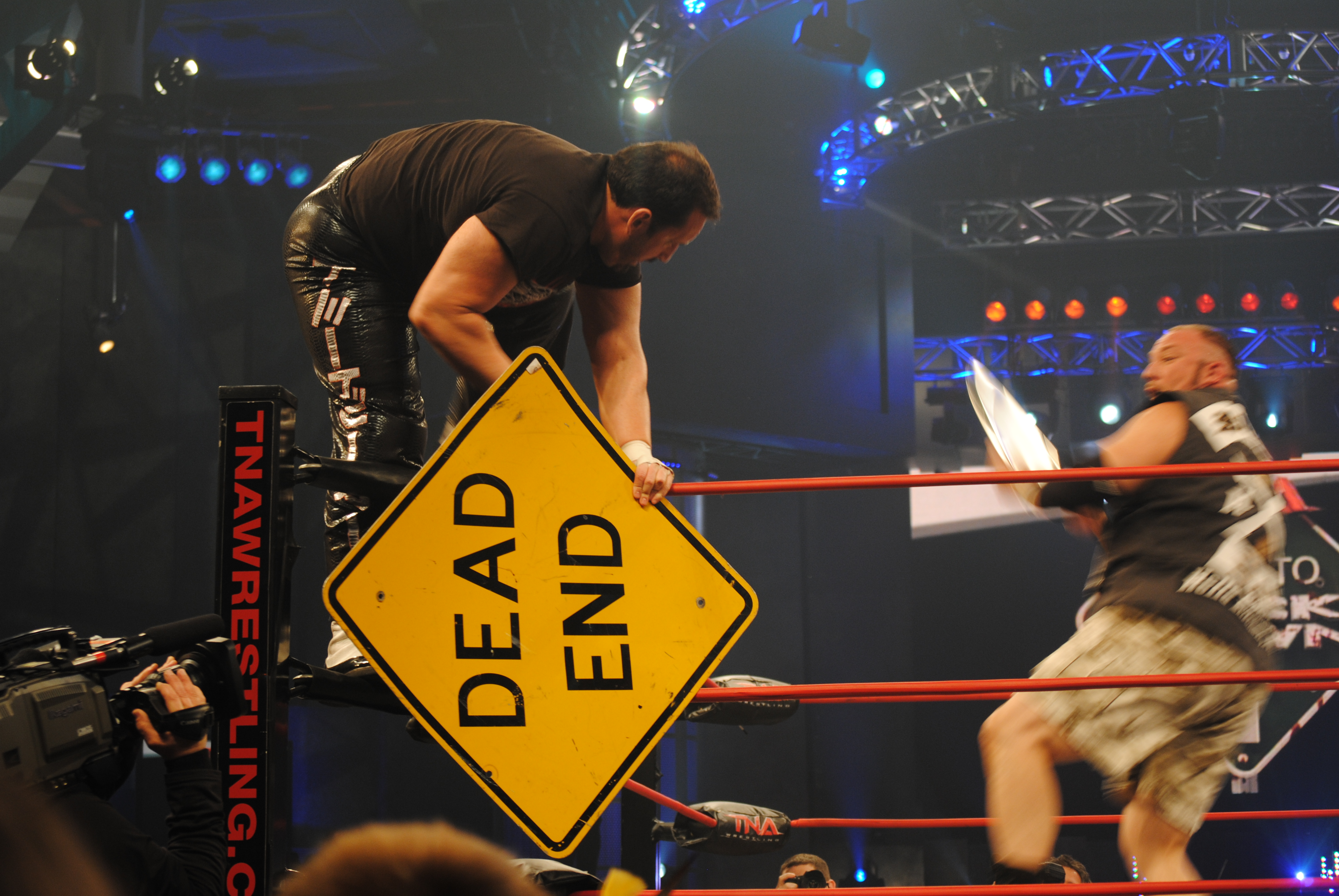
Tommy Dreamer vs Bully Ray in 2011

On the following episode of Impact!, the ECW alumni, known collectively as Extreme, Version 2.0 (EV 2.0), were assaulted by A.J. Styles, Kazarian, Robert Roode, James Storm, Douglas Williams and Matt Morgan of Ric Flair's Fourtune stable, who thought they did not deserve to be in TNA. The following week TNA president Dixie Carter gave each member of EV 2.0 TNA contracts in order for them to settle their score with Fourtune. At No Surrender Dreamer lost an "I Quit" match to A.J. Styles due to Styles putting a fork into his eye. Dreamer admitted EV 2.0's defeat on the following episode of Impact! and tried to reach a truce with Fourtune, but was beaten down. The following week he returned with Raven, Stevie Richards, Sabu and Rhino and announced that Dixie Carter had given the five of them a Lethal Lockdown match against Fourtune at Bound for Glory. At Bound for Glory Dreamer, Raven, Rhino, Richards and Sabu defeated Fourtune members Styles, Kazarian, Morgan, Roode and Storm in a Lethal Lockdown match, when Dreamer pinned Styles. After weeks of dissension between Rob Van Dam and the rest of EV 2.0, caused by Van Dam's belief that there was a traitor within the group, Dreamer challenged him to a match. At Turning Point Van Dam defeated Dreamer and afterwards made peace with him. On the following episode of Impact!, Rhino turned heel by attacking Van Dam and Dreamer, revealing himself as the traitor Van Dam had been looking for. The following week Dreamer defeated Rhino in a Street Fight, but he suffered an injured wrist during the match. After spending some time off television, Dreamer returned on the February 24 episode of Impact!, becoming entangled in the feud between former tag team partners Bully Ray and Brother Devon. On March 13 at Victory Road, Dreamer defeated Ray in a Falls Count Anywhere match, following interference from Devon.

==== Immortal (2011) ====
On the May 5 episode of Impact!, Dreamer was forced to attack A.J. Styles and to join Immortal in order to save his job in TNA. Dreamer was later confronted on his choice by A.J. Styles, which led to a match at Sacrifice, where Dreamer was victorious following interference from Bully Ray. On the following episode of Impact Wrestling, Dreamer officially turned heel, citing the first time he attacked Styles was due to being forced by Ray, before willingly attacking Styles because he wanted to and proceeding to berate the crowd by calling them "pieces of crap" for not sympathizing with his job situation. This is also the first time that Dreamer has wrestled as a heel since being a member of the Alliance during his WWF/E career. On the May 26 episode of Impact Wrestling, Styles and Christopher Daniels defeated Dreamer and Ray in a no disqualification street fight. On June 6 Dreamer confirmed that TNA's house show in Memphis, Tennessee on June 11 would be his final appearance for TNA. In his final TNA match, Dreamer teamed with Bully Ray in a losing effort against A.J. Styles and Brother Devon. After the match Bully berates Dreamer, causing Dreamer to turn on him and make up with Styles and Devon.

=== Independent circuit (2010–present) ===
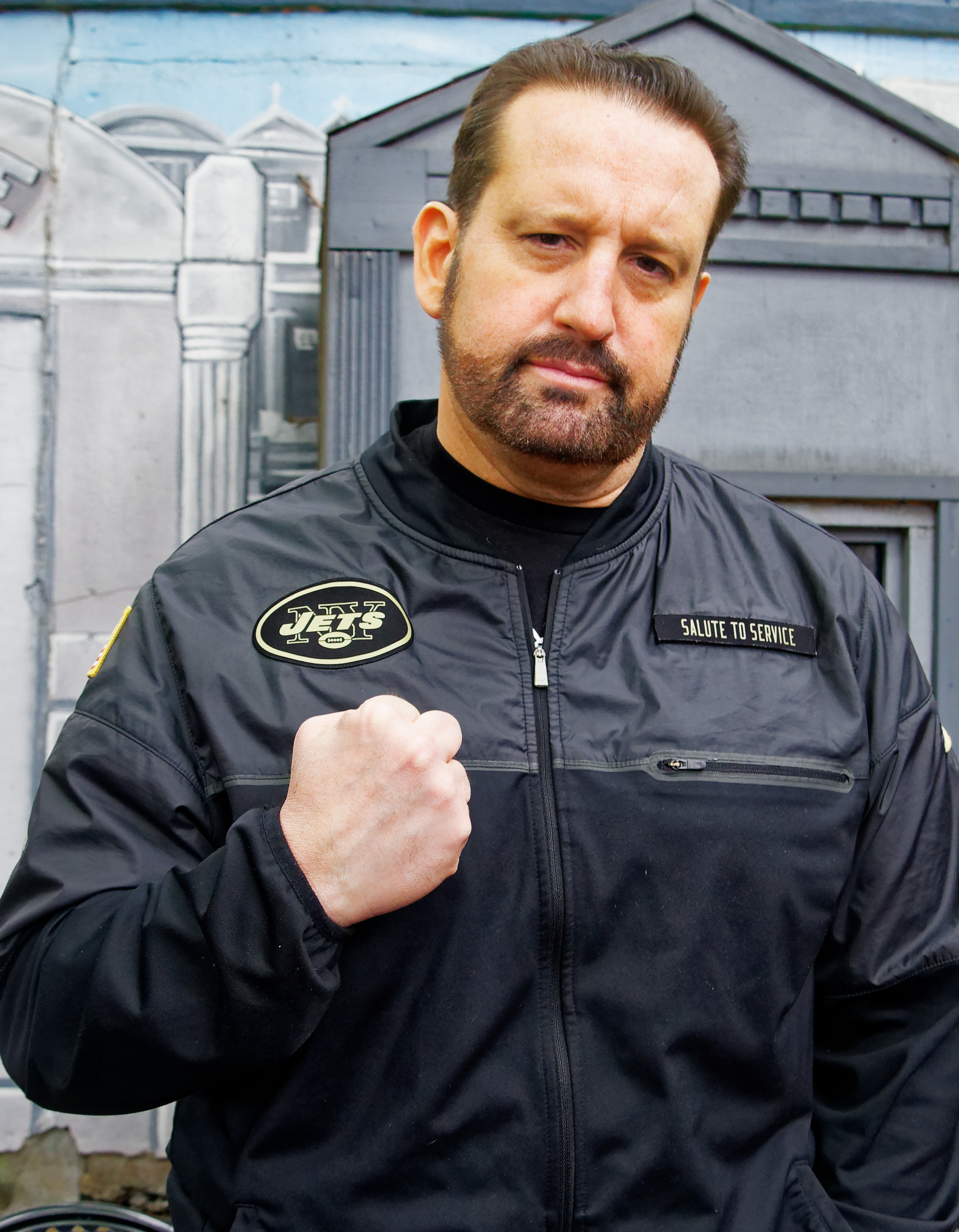
Dreamer in 2018

Dreamer appeared at the inaugural event of Evolve on January 17, 2010, in a non-wrestling role, getting involved in a match which led to him brawling with Jimmy Jacobs. Later that month, on January 23, Dreamer debuted for Dragon Gate USA, saving Jacobs and Lacey from a beating at the hands of Jon Moxley. On March 27, Dreamer made his pay-per-view debut for Dragon Gate USA in Phoenix, Arizona, where he lost a hardcore match to Moxley, which was taped for the Mercury Rising pay-per-view.

On April 25, Dreamer made his debut for Philadelphia-based Chikara, challenging Eddie Kingston to a match at the Anniversary show on May 23. Kingston won the match via disqualification when Ares and Claudio Castagnoli of the Bruderschaft des Kreuzes (BDK) attacked him. Dreamer assisted Kingston in taking care of BDK and then made a challenge for a tag team match on July 25 at The Arena in Philadelphia. Earlier that same day, Kingston inducted Dreamer into the Hardcore Hall of Fame. BDK ended up defeating Dreamer and Kingston, when Castagnoli pinned Dreamer.

Dreamer returned to Chikara on November 13, 2011, at the promotion's first ever internet pay-per-view, High Noon, accompanying Eddie Kingston to his Chikara Grand Championship match. On July 28, 2012, Dreamer wrestled for Family Wrestling Entertainment in which he defeated Brian Kendrick, Carlito and champion Jay Lethal in a four-way Elimination match to become the new FWE Heavyweight Champion. On September 14, 2012, Dreamer returned to Chikara, when he, Jerry Lynn and Too Cold Scorpio entered the 2012 King of Trios as "The Extreme Trio", defeating Team WWF (1–2–3 Kid, Aldo Montoya and Tatanka) in their first round match. The following day, The Extreme Trio was eliminated from the tournament by Team ROH (Mike Bennett, Matt Jackson and Nick Jackson). On October 4, 2012, he retained the FWE Heavyweight Championship against Rhino in the first PPV of the company.

On November 25, 2012, Dreamer returned to Japan to take part in an independent event produced by The Big Guns. During the event, Dreamer and Makoto defeated Akira and Syuri in a mixed tag team hardcore match. The following day, Dreamer made his debut for Wrestling New Classic (WNC), the follow-up promotion to Smash, entering the WNC Championship tournament and defeating Yusuke Kodama in his first round match. Two days later, Dreamer was defeated in his semi-final match by Akira.

Tommy Dreamer worked with Ring of Honor during 2017 coming to the aid of Bully Ray who had been attacked by former allies The Briscoe Brothers. Tommy Dreamer and Bully Ray teamed against The Briscoe Brothers in a losing effort at ROH Final Battle 2017. He made his debut in Lucha Underground in Aztec Warfare IV, Episode 1 of Lucha Underground's fourth season on June 13, 2018, at number 7, and was pinned and eliminated by Pentagón Dark.

=== House of Hardcore (2012–2020) ===
In 2012, Dreamer opened his own wrestling promotion and wrestling school, House of Hardcore, which is the name of the former ECW wrestling school. The promotion made its debut on October 6, 2012, at the Mid-Hudson Civic Center in Poughkeepsie, New York. In the main event of the first show, Dreamer lost the FWE Heavyweight Championship to Carlito in a three-way match, which also included Mike Knox. On June 22, 2013, Dreamer defeated Lance Storm in the main event at House of Hardcore 2.

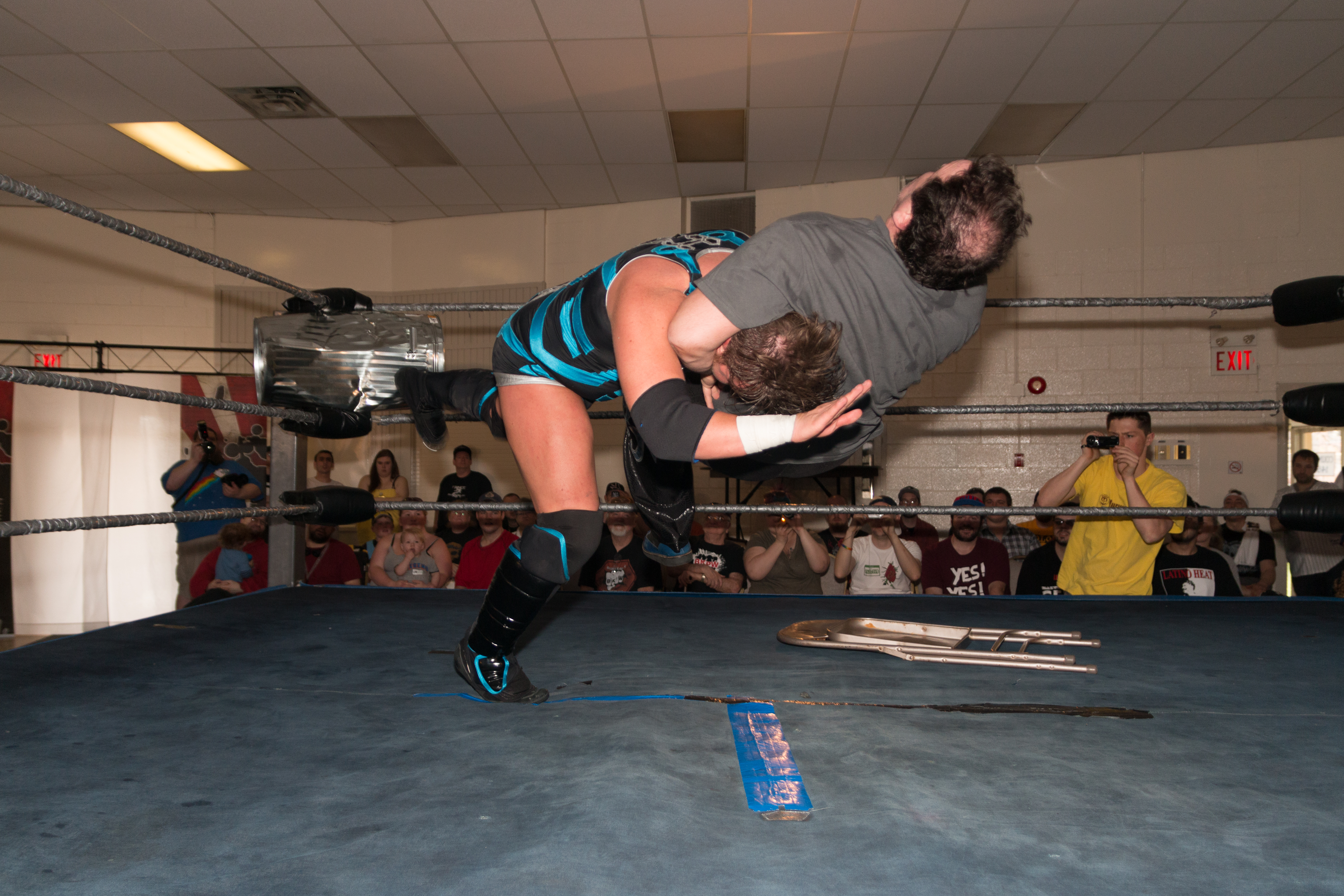
Dreamer performing a DDT on Scotty O'Shea

On November 9, 2013, Dreamer participated in the main event of House of Hardcore 3. Dreamer and Terry Funk defeated Sean Waltman and Lance Storm. The match was promoted as the last time of Funk and Dreamer as a tag team. After the match, Dreamer was assaulted by TNA wrestlers Team 3D, Bully Ray (formerly Buh Buh Ray Dudley) and Devon (formerly D-Von). Ray challenged Dreamer to a match at TNA One Night Only – Old School. On June 6, 2014, Dreamer was scheduled to face Team 3D along with Abyss. However, Bully Ray was pulled out of the event, so the main event was Devon and Dreamer vs Rhino and Abyss. Dreamer and Devon won the match. At House of Hardcore VII, Dreamer wrestled against Bobby Roode for the TNA World Heavyweight Championship, but he was defeated. Dreamer now owns his House of Hardcore promotion. He has made various touring tours across the United States and over the years at his owner's level he is still fighting and defeating his opponents in hardcore matches. On December 2, 2017, House of Hardcore 36 Abyss defeated Dreamer. On January 27, 2018, House of Hardcore 37 Team of Tommy Dreamer and Billy Gunn beat the team of Joey Mercury and Nick Aldis. On March 23, 2018, in the 38 episode of House of Hardcore Tommy Dreamer beat Joey Mercury in one very brutal street fight match; the day after this match, Dreamer was a contender for the NWA World Heavyweight Championship against Nick Aldis, but he failed to win the title.

=== Return to TNA (2013–2015) ===
On January 17, 2013, Dreamer made an appearance Impact Wrestling as one of Bully Ray's groomsmen during his wedding to Brooke Hogan. He was assaulted by Aces & Eights after they crashed the ceremony. Dreamer returned to TNA in late 2013. He faced Ethan Carter III at two house shows and on December 29, 2013, at TNA Hardcore Justice 3, Dreamer was defeated by Ethan Carter III in a Tables match. The next day, Dreamer was defeated by Bully Ray at TNA #OldSchool in a Falls Count Anywhere match that happened due to Bully Ray attacking Dreamer and Terry Funk at House of Hardcore III.

At Lockdown in January 2014, Dreamer returned to the company as a road agent. on the July 17 episode of Impact, Dreamer and Bully Ray faced Ethan Carter III and Rhyno in a losing effort. on the July 24 episode of Impact, Dreamer and Team 3D faced Ethan Carter III, Rhino, and Rockstar Spud in a 6-man New York City street fight in a losing effort after a run in by Snitsky and Rycklon. On the August 7 taping of Impact Wrestling, Dreamer, Team 3D, and Al Snow defeated Team Dixie (Ethan Carter III, Rhyno, Rycklon Stephens, and Snitsky) in a hardcore tag team war. Shortly afterward, Bully Ray powerbombed Dixie Carter through a table.

On the August 27 episode of Impact Wrestling, Dreamer was defeated by TNA World Heavyweight Champion Lashley in a non-title New York City street fight. The day before Bound For Glory Dreamer would induct Team 3D into the TNA Hall of Fame and at Bound for Glory, Dreamer teamed up with Abyss to face Team 3D in a losing effort. On the October 29 episode of Impact Wrestling, Dreamer helped Devon brawl with Bram and Magnus. On the November 5 episode of Impact, Dreamer and Devon defeated Bram and Magnus in a hardcore tag team match. On the November 19, 2014, episode of Impact, Dreamer faced Bram in a hardcore match but lost. on the February 20 episode of Impact, Dreamer faced Eric Young in a Hardcore match but lost the match. At Bound for Glory, Dreamer competed in the 12-man Bound for Gold Gauntlet match which was won by Tyrus. Bound for Glory turned out to be Dreamer's final appearance with the company. Dreamer was reportedly fired due to an argument with fellow producers after cancelling the India Tour.

=== Second return to WWE (2012; 2015–2016) ===
On the December 17, 2012 episode of Raw, Dreamer made a one-off appearance as the surprise tag team partner of The Miz and Alberto Del Rio, defeating 3MB (Heath Slater, Drew McIntyre and Jinder Mahal) in a six-man tag team match. Later on in the night, Dreamer was attacked backstage by The Shield.

On the November 30, 2015 episode of Raw, Dreamer returned, teaming with The Dudley Boyz in a six-man tag match against The Wyatt Family which ended in a no contest. The following week on Raw, Dreamer and The Dudley Boyz would be joined by Rhyno, forming Team Extreme, competing in a 16-man elimination Fatal 4-Way tag team match, where Dreamer would pin Erick Rowan to eliminate The Wyatt Family before Team Extreme would be eliminated by The League of Nations. Later, Dreamer lost to Braun Strowman. At TLC: Tables, Ladders and Chairs, Team Extreme was defeated by The Wyatt Family in an 8-man elimination tag team tables match. The following night on Raw, Team Extreme would challenge The Wyatt Family to a rematch, this time in an 8-man Extreme Rules match, in a losing effort. Dreamer continued to make live event appearances for the WWE in 2016 while becoming a regular guest on the WWE Network exclusive series, The Edge & Christian Show That Totally Reeks of Awesomeness, alongside the show's hosts, Edge and Christian. In November 2016, Dreamer began filming an ECW show for the WWE Network alongside Paul Heyman, Tazz and Bubba Ray Dudley.

=== Second return to Impact/TNA (2018–2026) ===
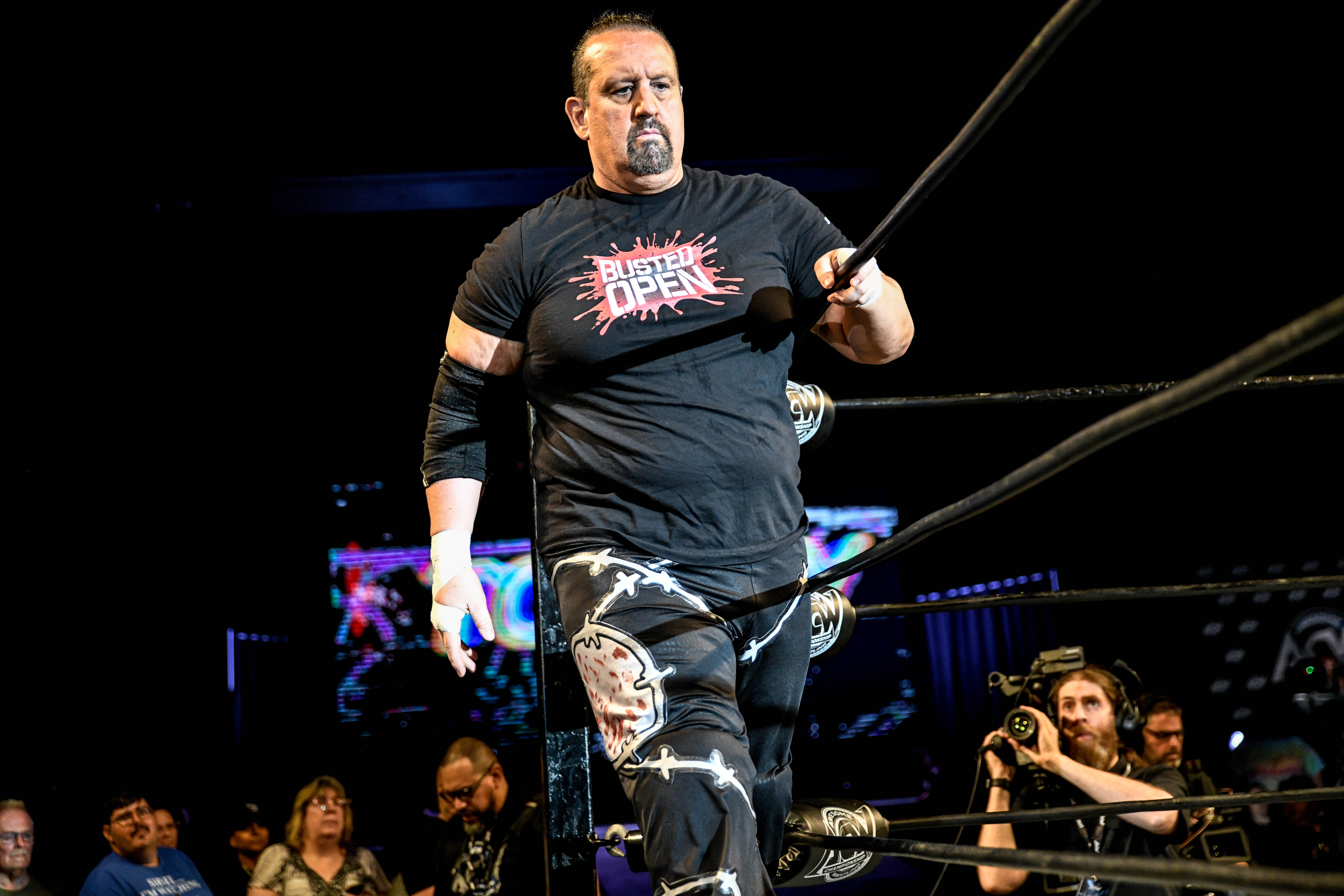
Tommy Dreamer in 2025

Dreamer returned to Impact Wrestling on the April 12 episode of Impact when he helped Eddie Edwards and Moose from an attack from Ohio Versus Everything and challenged them to a House of Hardcore Match at Redemption, in which he lost. On the June 14, 2018, episode of Impact, Edwards brutally hit Dreamer with a kendo stick because of their loss at Redemption. Edwards and Dreamer would later start an intense feud which ended when Edwards beat Dreamer in a street fight in a match at Slammiversary. At Bound for Glory, Dreamer saved Edwards from an attack from Killer Kross and Moose. This led to a tag team match in which the team was victorious.

On January 23, 2019, it was revealed that Dreamer would now be working as a member of the creative team for Impact Wrestling. He had already been serving as a producer for some time. At Slammiversary, Dreamer unsuccessful challenged Moose in an Old School Rules match for the unsanctioned TNA World Heavyweight Championship. At Victory Road, he was defeated by Brian Myers. On the October 27 episode of Impact, Swoggle helped Dreamer in defeating Brian Myers in a hardcore match by hitting Myers with a low blow. At No Surrender on February 13, 2021, his 50th birthday, Dreamer unsuccessfully challenged Rich Swann for the Impact World Championship.

On September 17, 2021, Impact officials announced that Dreamer had been suspended indefinitely due to the comments he made on an episode of Dark Side of the Ring, which saw Dreamer defend Ric Flair concerning the allegation that Flair made multiple unwanted sexual advances towards a flight attendant on a flight from England to the U.S. in 2002. He left Impact in November 2021. In December, Dreamer returned to Impact both as a producer and semi-active wrestler.

At Victory Road on September 8, 2023, he won the Impact Digital Media Championship by defeating Kenny King in a Title vs. Career match. He would hold the title until January 13, 2024, at Hard To Kill, when he lost the title to Crazzy Steve.

On June 17, 2026, Dreamer announced on Busted Open Radio that he mutually agreed to part ways with TNA.

=== Major League Wrestling (2018–2019) ===
Dreamer joined Major League Wrestling in 2018 as a wrestler and in a backstage role as an agent for matches. His first match for the promotion would be at MLW War Games in September 2018. Dreamer would be on the winning team in the War Games match as himself, John Hennigan, Shane Strickland, Barrington Hughes and Kotto Brazil defeated Abyss, Jimmy Havoc, Sami Callihan and his team The Death Machines. In his match at the next set of television tapings, he would be defeated by Brody King. He then entered a feud with Brian Pillman Jr. over his lack of respect for veterans such as Kevin Sullivan and himself. He beat Pillman in their first encounter, but three weeks later, Pillman would pin Dreamer in a tag team match on the December 21, 2018 episode of MLW Fusion. On January 11, 2019, episode of Fusion, Pillman defeated Dreamer in a Singapore Cane match.

=== All Elite Wrestling (2019) ===
Dreamer participated in All Elite Wrestling (AEW)'s Casino Battle Royale at their inaugural pay-per-view event Double or Nothing on May 25, 2019. He failed to win as he was eliminated by Jimmy Havoc. At their following PPV All Out, Dreamer worked backstage as a producer during the event.

== Other media ==
Dreamer appeared along with fellow ECW wrestler New Jack in the "Mel Schwartz, Bounty Hunter" episode of the TV series Early Edition as a biker. In October 2011, Dreamer started his own YouTube series, titled The Tommy Dreamer TV. The show is produced by Brooke Platzner with graphics and music by Jason Platzner. He is a playable character in various video games including ECW Anarchy Rulz, ECW Hardcore Revolution, WWE Raw 2, WWE SmackDown vs. Raw 2008, WWE SmackDown vs. Raw 2009, WWE SmackDown vs. Raw 2010, WWE Legends of WrestleMania, TNA Wrestling Impact!, and RetroMania Wrestling.

Dreamer appeared on an episode of the TruTV television show Impractical Jokers in 2014, as one of the show's main members, Brian "Q" Quinn, had to wrestle him as part of his punishment for losing the most challenges on that episode. He had another cameo on the show in 2017, in a challenge where he had to take Q's pants off, before a stranger untangles his earphones.

In 2013, he portrayed Officer Carpoza in the horror film Army of the Damned. Dreamer also has a cameo, alongside fellow wrestlers Diamond Dallas Page, Jake Roberts and Roddy Piper, in the comedy film The Bet.

In 2017, he starred as Detective Marx in the drama-thriller 'The Abduction of Jennifer Grayson', where he was credited as "Tom Dreamer".

Dreamer is also a co-host for the SiriusXM program Busted Open, a wrestling-based radio show. Other hosts include Dave LaGreca, Bubba/Bully Ray Dudley, Mark Henry, Nic Nemeth, Thunder Rosa, Denise Salcedo, Johnathan Hood, Justin LaBar and Bishop Dyer (formerly known as Baron Corbin). Busted Open is found on SiriusXM Channel "Fight Nation" Monday through Sunday 7 days a week from 9am-12pm.

== Personal life ==
Laughlin is of Irish and Italian descent.

On October 12, 2002, at the Lake Isle Country Club in Eastchester, New York, Laughlin married Trisa Hayes, known as ECW wrestler/manager Beulah McGillicutty. The two have twin daughters, Brianna Laughlin and Kimberly Laughlin. Laughlin is in a long-term relationship with his manager Monique Dupree.

On a November 2011 Art of Wrestling podcast, Laughlin told host Colt Cabana his family is "connected" to the New York mafia. He recounted an incident after one of his first matches in Brooklyn, which was attended by various of his local relatives, in which he was attacked from behind and beaten down by Bill DeMott, wrestling at the time under the name Sweet William. Unaware of wrestling's scripted nature, several of his relatives at ringside got angry; aside from his grandfather jumping over the railing and trying to fight off security guards, his aunt told DeMott as he passed that she would "put a hit" on him. The misunderstanding was later peacefully resolved.

In 2020, Laughlin claimed that his mental health was in such a poor state in 2001 that he contemplated murdering Paul Heyman and then killing himself live on television at WrestleMania X-Seven due to Heyman's financial mistreatment of Laughlin and other ECW wrestlers, but changed his mind after a chance phone call from Jim Ross.

== Championships and accomplishments ==
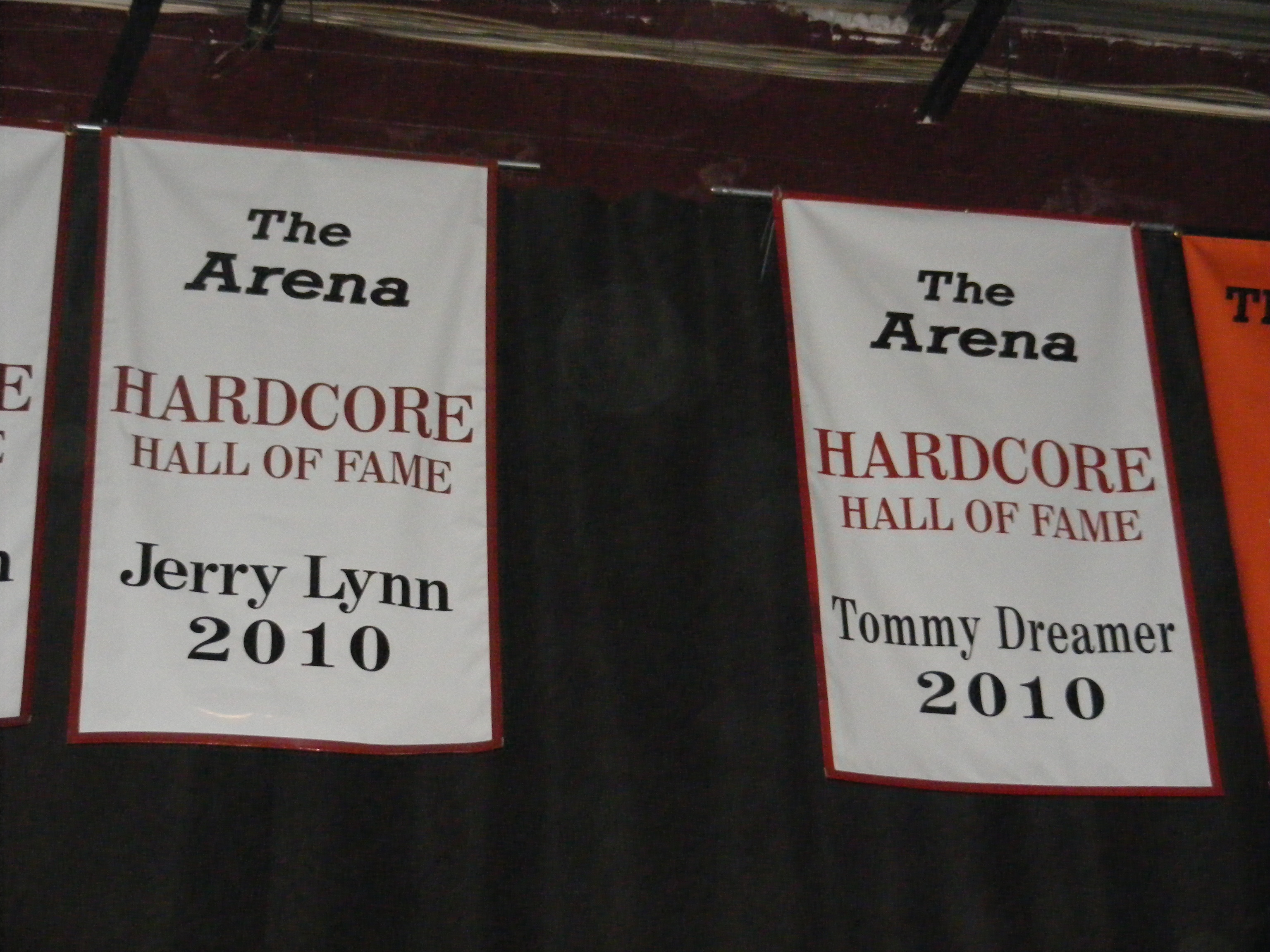
Dreamer's Hardcore Hall of Fame banner in the former ECW Arena

- Border City Wrestling
  - BCW Can-Am Heavyweight Championship (1 time)
  - BCW Can-Am Tag Team Championship (1 time) – with Nova
  - Most Shocking Moment of the Decade Award (2010)
- Busted Knuckle Pro Wrestling
  - BKPW Tag Team Championship (1 time) – with Markus Ryan
- Chinlock Wrestling
  - Chinlock Heavyweight Championship (1 time)
- Century Wrestling Alliance
  - CWA Heavyweight Championship (1 time)
  - CWA Heavyweight Title Tournament (1992)
- Clash Wrestling
  - Clash Championship (1 time)
- Cutting Edge Wrestling
  - CEW North Atlantic Championship (1 time)
- DDT Pro-Wrestling
  - Ironman Heavymetalweight Championship (2 times)
- Devotion Championship Wrestling
  - DCW Heavyweight Championship (1 time)
- Eastern/Extreme Championship Wrestling
  - ECW World Heavyweight Championship (1 time)
  - ECW World Tag Team Championship (3 times) – with Johnny Gunn (1), Raven (1) and Masato Tanaka (1)
  - Lights Out Battle Royal (1993)
- Elite Pro Wrestling Alliance
  - EPWA Heavyweight Championship (1 time)
- Family Wrestling Entertainment
  - FWE Heavyweight Championship (1 time)
  - FWE Rumble (2013)
- Gimmick Tree Entertainment
  - Bruiser Brody Cup (2019)
- Greektown Pro Wrestling
  - Greektown Cup Championship (1 time)
- Hardcore Hall of Fame
  - Class of 2010
- Impact Wrestling / Total Nonstop Action Wrestling
  - Impact/TNA Digital Media Championship (1 time)
- Impact Championship Wrestling
  - ICW Heavyweight Championship (1 time)
- International World Class Championship Wrestling
  - IWCCW Tag Team Championship (3 times) – with G.Q. Madison
- International Wrestling Association
  - IWA Hardcore Championship (1 time)
- International Wrestling Cartel
  - IWC World Heavyweight Championship (1 time)
  - IWC Tag Team Championship (1 time) - with Channing Decker
- KYDA Pro Wrestling
  - KYDA Pro Heavyweight Championship (1 time)
- MJN Center Wrestling Hall of Fame
  - Class of 2025
- LIVE Pro Wrestling
  - LIVE Heavyweight Championship (1 time)
- Ohio Valley Wrestling
  - OVW Anarchy Championship (1 time)
- Pro Wrestling Fighters
  - PWF North-European Championship (1 time)
- Pro Wrestling Illustrated
  - Ranked No. 28 of the top 500 singles wrestlers in the PWI 500 in 2000
  - Ranked No. 184 of the top 500 wrestlers in the "PWI Years" in 2003
- Pure Wrestling Association
  - Carrot Cup (2015) – with Rhino
- RetroMania Wrestling
  - RetroMania Wrestling Championship (1 time, current)
- Squared Circle Wrestling
  - 2CW Heavyweight Championship (1 time)
- Universal Championship Wrestling
  - UCW Universal Heavyweight Championship (2 times)
- Superstars of Wrestling Federation
  - SWF Heavyweight Championship (1 time)
- Warriors of Wrestling
  - WOW No Limits Championship (1 time)
- World Wrestling Federation / World Wrestling Entertainment
  - ECW Championship (1 time)
  - WWF/E Hardcore Championship (14 times)
