= IWRG Cabellera vs. Cabellera (July 2018) =

2018 International Wrestling Revolution Group event

IWRG Cabellera vs. Cabellera (June 2018)
- Official poster for the event, depicting Ovett and Mosco X-Fly
- Date: July 15, 2018
- City: Naucalpan, State of Mexico
- Venue: Arena Naucalpan

Event chronology
← Previous; Festival de las Máscaras	Next → Zona de Ejecucion

IWRG Lucha de Apuestas chronology
← Previous; June 2018	Next → March 2019

The IWRG Cabellera vs. Cabellera (Spanish for "Hair vs. Hair") show was a major lucha libre event produced and scripted by Mexican professional wrestling promotion International Wrestling Revolution Group (IWRG), that took place on July 15, 2018, in Arena Naucalpan, Naucalpan, State of Mexico, Mexico. The focal point of the "Cabellera vs. Cabellera" series of shows is one or more traditional Lucha de Apuestas, or "Bet matches", where all competitors in the match risk their hair on the outcome of the match. The Lucha de Apuestas is considered the most prestigious match type in lucha libre, especially when a wrestlers mask is on the line, but the "hair vs. hair" stipulation is held in almost as high regard. The July Cabellera vs. Cabellera event was the third under that name held by IWRG in 2018, preceded by a January event and a June event.

For the July 2018 Cabellera vs. Cabellera event Obett defeated X-Fly in the culmination of a several months long storyline that also included Obett' s son Lunatic Xtreme and X-Fly's son, El Hijo de X-Fly. After X-Fly was forced to have all his hair shaved off. The show featured five additional matches.

== Production ==
=== Background ===
In Lucha libre the wrestling mask holds a sacred place, with the most anticipated and prestigious matches being those where a wrestler's mask is on the line, a so-called Lucha de Apuestas, or "bet match" where the loser would be forced to unmask in the middle of the ring and state their birth name. Winning a mask is considered a bigger accomplishment in lucha libre than winning a professional wrestling championship and usually draws more people and press coverage. Losing a mask is often a watershed moment in a wrestler's career, they give up the mystique and prestige of being an enmascarado (masked wrestler) but usually come with a higher than usual payment from the promoter. By the same token a wrestler betting his hair in a Lucha de Apuestas is seen as highly prestigious, usually a step below the mask match.

=== Storylines ===
The event featured five professional wrestling matches with different wrestlers involved in pre-existing scripted feuds, plots and storylines. Wrestlers were portrayed as either heels (referred to as rudos in Mexico, those that portray the "bad guys") or faces (técnicos in Mexico, the "good guy" characters) as they followed a series of tension-building events, which culminated in a wrestling match or series of matches.

== Results ==
No.	Results	Stipulations
1	Atomic Star and Death Metal defeated Angel Estrella Jr. and Shadow Boy	Best two-out-of-three-falls match
2	Aramís and Mexica defeated El Hijo de X-Fly and Lunatic Xtreme	Best two-out-of-three-falls tag team match
3	Los Tortugas Negra (Ra-Zhata, Shil-Kah and Teelo) defeated Los Tortugas Ninjas (Leo, Mike and Rafy)	Best two-out-of-three-falls six-man tag team match
4	Los Terribles Cerebros (Cerebro Negro and Dr. Cerebro) defeated Freelance and Relampago	Best two-out-of-three-falls tag team match
5	Danny Casas, El Hijo del Alebrije and Imposible defeated Las Traumas (Trauma I and Trauma II) and El Hijo del Médico Asesino	Best two-out-of-three-falls tag team match
6	Obett defeated X-Fly	Lucha de Apuestas, hair vs. hair match
