= IWRG Cabellera vs. Cabellera (June 2018) =

2018 International Wrestling Revolution Group event

- Official poster for the event
- Date: June 3, 2018
- City: Naucalpan, State of Mexico
- Venue: Arena Naucalpan

Event chronology
← Previous; Rey del Ring	Next → Festival de las Máscaras

IWRG Lucha de Apuestas chronology
← Previous; March 2018	Next → July 2018

The IWRG Cabellera vs. Cabellera (Spanish for "Hair vs. Hair") show was a major lucha libre event produced and scripted by Mexican professional wrestling promotion International Wrestling Revolution Group (IWRG), that took place on June 3, 2018 in Arena Naucalpan, Naucalpan, State of Mexico, Mexico. The focal point of the Cabellera vs. Cabellera series of shows is one or more traditional Lucha de Apuestas, or "Bet matches", where all competitors in the match risk their hair on the outcome of the match. The Lucha de Apuestas is considered the most prestigious match type in lucha libre, especially when a wrestlers mask is on the line, but the "hair vs. hair" stipulation is held in almost as high regard.

For the June 2018 Cabellera vs. Cabellera event Black Dragon faced off against, and defeating, Lunatik Xtreme. This marked the second Cabellera vs. Cabellera event that Black Dragon main evented in 2018 that he had won as he also won the headliner on the February show. After the match Lunatik Extreme was forced to have all his hair shaved off. The show featured five additional matches.

== Production ==
=== Background ===
In Lucha libre the wrestling mask holds a sacred place, with the most anticipated and prestigious matches being those where a wrestler's mask is on the line, a so-called Lucha de Apuestas, or "bet match" where the loser would be forced to unmask in the middle of the ring and state their birth name. Winning a mask is considered a bigger accomplishment in lucha libre than winning a professional wrestling championship and usually draws more people and press coverage. Losing a mask is often a watershed moment in a wrestler's career, they give up the mystique and prestige of being an enmascarado (masked wrestler) but usually come with a higher than usual payment from the promoter. By the same token a wrestler betting his hair in a Lucha de Apuestas is seen as highly prestigious, usually a step below the mask match.

=== Storylines ===
The event featured five professional wrestling matches with different wrestlers involved in pre-existing scripted feuds, plots and storylines. Wrestlers were portrayed as either heels (referred to as rudos in Mexico, those that portray the "bad guys") or faces (técnicos in Mexico, the "good guy" characters) as they followed a series of tension-building events, which culminated in a wrestling match or series of matches.

== Results ==
No.	Results	Stipulations
1	Shaolin defeated Death Metal	Best two-out-of-three-falls match
2	Atomic Star and Gallo Frances defeated Alas de Acero and Mexica	Best two-out-of-three-falls tag team match
3	Dragon Bane, Picudo Jr. and Psycho Kid defeated Aramís, Chico Che and Freelance	Best two-out-of-three-falls six-man tag team match
4	Eterno, Obett and X-Fly defeated Danny Casas, El Hijo de Canis Lupus and Veneno	Best two-out-of-three-falls six-man tag team match
5	Emperador Azteca and Imposible vs. Los Terribles Cerebros (Cerebro Negro and Dr. Cerebro) ended in a double count-out	Best two-out-of-three-falls tag team match
6	Black Dragon defeated Lunatik Xtreme	Lucha de Apuestas, hair vs. hair match
