= IWRG Zona de Ejecucion (January 2018) =

2018 International Wrestling Revolution Group event

IWRG Zona de Ejecucion (February 2018)
- Official poster for the event
- Date: January 7, 2018
- City: Naucalpan, State of Mexico
- Venue: Arena Naucalpan

Event chronology
← Previous; IWRG 22nd Anniversary Show	Next → Cabellera vs. Cabellera

Zona de Ejecucion chronology
← Previous; First	Next → July 2018

The Zona de Ejecucion (February 2018) (Spanish for "Elimination Zone") was a major lucha libre event produced and scripted by Mexican Lucha Libre, or professional wrestling promotion, International Wrestling Revolution Group (IWRG). The show was held on January 7, 2018 in Arena Naucalpan, Naucalpan, State of Mexico, Mexico, IWRG's main arena. The show was the first time IWRG held the eponymous Zona de Ejecucion match, followed by a second Zona de Ejecucion in July.

The Zona de Ejecucion match was a 16-man elimination match, where a wrestler was forced to leave the match after they were pinned or forced to submit. In the end Aramís outlasted Imposible, Heddi Karaoui, Eterno, El Diablo Jr., El Hijo del Alebrije, Alas de Acero, Freelance, Rafy, Leo, Teelo, Mike, Dinamic Black, Dragón Fly, Black Dragón and Pantera I to win the match. After the match Aramis challenged Pantera I to a match for Pantera's IWRG Intercontinental Lightweight Championship. The show featured five additional matches.

== Storylines ==
The event featured five professional wrestling matches with different wrestlers involved in pre-existing scripted feuds, plots and storylines. Wrestlers were portrayed as either heels (referred to as rudos in Mexico, those that portray the "bad guys") or faces (técnicos in Mexico, the "good guy" characters) as they followed a series of tension-building events, which culminated in a wrestling match or series of matches.

== Results ==
No.	Results	Stipulations
1	Dranzer, Exotic Drago and Puma de Oro defeated Biosfera, Dinamico and Kraken	Best two-out-of-three-falls six-man tag team match
2	Dragon Horus and Super Brazo Jr. defeated Leroy and Lunatic Extreme	Best two-out-of-three-falls tag team match
3	Odin defeated Shadow Boy	Best two-out-of-three-falls match
4	Capo del Norte, Capo del Sur and Obett defeated Chico Che, Danny Casas and Veneno	Best two-out-of-three-falls six-man tag team match
5	Las Traumas (Trauma I and Trauma II) defeated El Hijo del Pantera and El Pantera II	Best two-out-of-three-falls tag team match
6	Aramís defeated Black Dragon and Alas de Acero and Diablo Jr. and Dinamic Black and Dragon Fly and El Hijo del Alebrije and El Pantera I and Eterno and Freelance and Heddi Karaoui and Imposible and Leo and Mike and Rafy and Teelo	Zona de Ejecucion elimination match
