= Sinn Bodhi =

Canadian professional wrestler (born 1973)

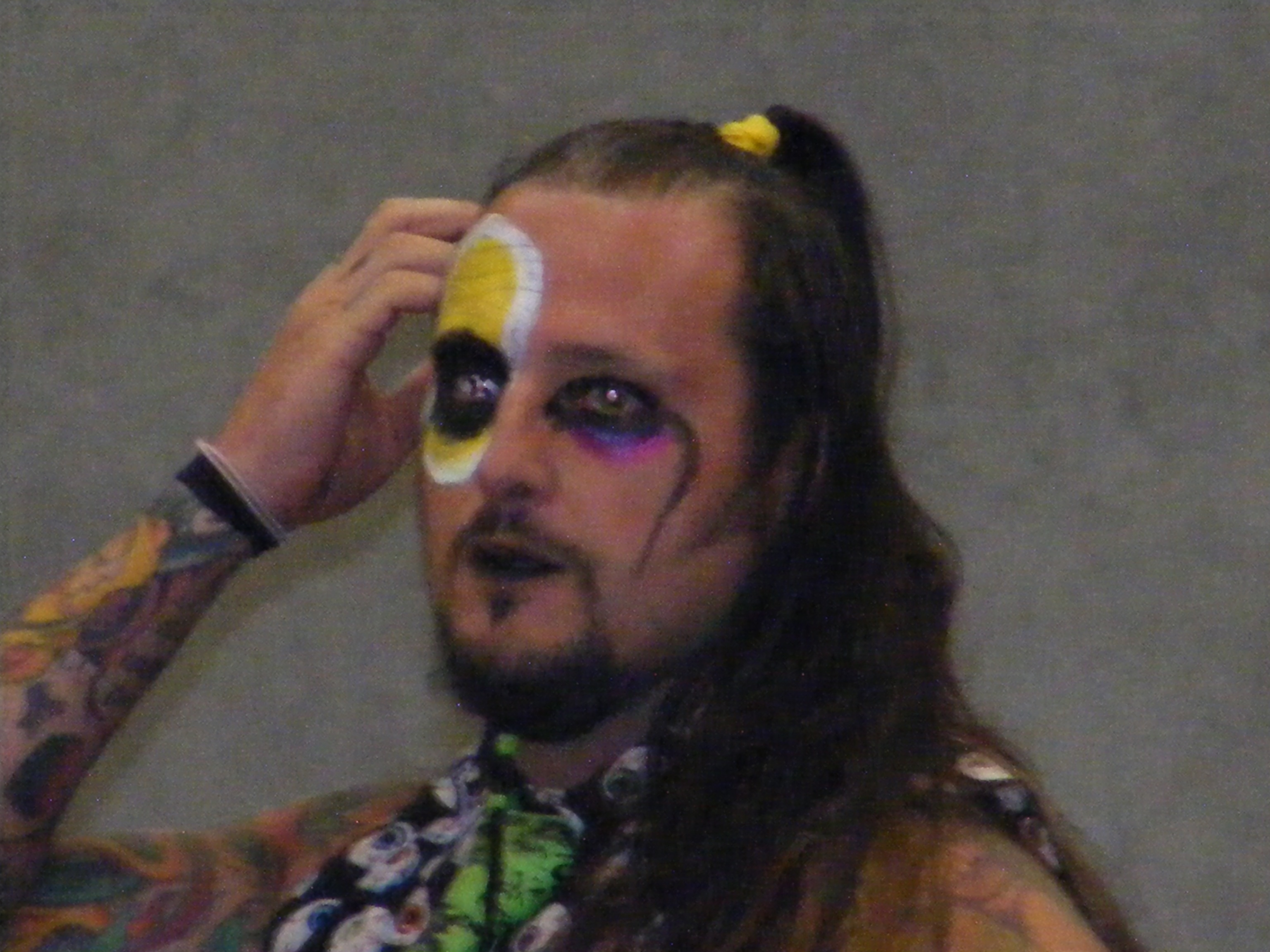
- Bodhi in 2011

Personal information
- Born: Nicholas Cvjetkovich; August 29, 1973 (age 53) Toronto, Ontario, Canada
- Spouses: Stacy Carter (m. 2010; div. 2013) Karen Elliott (m. 2022)

Professional wrestling career
- Ring name(s): Dr. Nick Sinnful; H.N. Hardcastle; Kizarny; Lucifer Love; Nicholas Doom; Nicholas Sinn; Nick Doom; Nick Sinn; Nikolas Sinn; Original Sinn; Sinn; Sinn Bodhi; Sinn Bowdee
- Billed height: 6 ft 2 in (1.88 m)
- Billed weight: 234 lb (106 kg)
- Billed from: Toronto, Ontario, Canada; Wizard Beach; Las Vegas, Nevada
- Trained by: Ron Hutchison; Dr. Tom Prichard; Alex Atkinson; Jake Roberts; Dusty Rhodes; Al Snow; Rip Rogers; Inoki Dojo
- Debut: 2000

Nicholas Cvjetkovich (Serbo-Croatian: Николас Цвјетковиђ, Nikolas Cvjetković; born August 29, 1973) is a Serbo-Canadian professional wrestler currently working on the independent circuit as Sinn Bodhi. He is best known for his 2009 stint in World Wrestling Entertainment (WWE) where he worked on its SmackDown brand as Kizarny. Additionally, Cvjetkovich works for the Power Slap slap fighting promotion company as a recruiter and matchmaker.

== Professional wrestling career ==
=== Early career (2000–2007) ===
Cvjetkovich was trained as a wrestler by Rob Fuego and Ron Hutchison in Orangeville, Ontario and also trained for (and later earned) his black belt at Alex Atkinson's Black Belt Institute. His debut match was in 2000 against El Fuego during the Apocalypse Wrestling Federation's Iron Man Tournament at the Canadian National Exhibition. He remained with the AWF until February 2001. He also worked several dates for Scott D'Amore's Border City Wrestling promotion in Windsor, Ontario, using the name "Lucifer Love" (as AWF employees were not allowed to work for regional competitors, Cvjetkovich used a different ring name and gimmick so he would not be found out).

Cvjetkovich began working for Northern Championship Wrestling in Montreal. He returned to the AWF in late 2001 and once again participated in the Iron Man Tournament, before forming a tag team with Fabian Stokes known as "High Maintenance". Cvjetkovich wrestled in several Twin Wrestling Entertainment TWE main events across Ontario, facing legends such as King Kong Bundy and "Hacksaw" Jim Duggan. In the summers of 2002 and 2003, Cvjetkovich wrestled across the Maritimes (Nova Scotia, New Brunswick, and Prince Edward Island) for All Canadian Wrestling run by Bobby Bass and Buddy Lane while competing with fellow wrestlers Peter Kingman, Kowboy Hughes, Jason Bates, Bobby Roode, and Jim Neidhart. In August 2003, Cvjetkovich won the ACW Heavyweight Championship.

In late 2003, Cvjetkovich appeared with "Dark Omen" Elvis Elliot at Fallout 2003 in Warren, MI on September 27. They won the IWR Tag Team Championship in a three-way tag team match, but were stripped of the titles within a month. Cvjetkovich performed with Sideshow Carnival Diablo throughout Ontario, Manitoba, and Quebec, where he was featured as a strong man, and performed feats such as bending iron bars in his teeth, acting as a Human Dartboard, and the Electric Chair. He then returned in March 2004 to participate in tag team tournaments across Canada with partner Elliot. On August 28, Cvjetkovich won the World Xtreme Wrestling Gulf Coast Team Division Championship with Ron Fargo. In December, Cvjetkovich lost to Adam Pearce at the New Japan Dojo.

In 2005, he began promoting an event called Warrior 1 Pro Wrestling LIVE! on June 26 at the General Motors Centre in Oshawa, Ontario. In the main event, Cvjetkovich and his partner Helvis were defeated by Team Canada (Petey Williams and Bobby Roode). In November 2005, Sinn returned to Carnival Diablo, as well as partnering with Helvis as "The Beasts of Burden". He also competed against Al Snow in TWE. On June 29, 2006, Cvjetkovich won the UWA Ottawa Heavyweight Championship by defeating Bobby Roode in a No Holds Barred match. From July to December, he wrestled regularly for the Pure Wrestling Association where he had multiple shots at the PWA Pure Violence Championship. While still based in Toronto, Cvjetkovich, alongside Eric Young (Jeremy Fritz), helped to break in various wrestlers like former ROH Champ Michael Elgin, Crazzy Steve, Angelina Love and Shawn Spears.

=== Total Nonstop Action Wrestling (2003–2005, 2013) ===
Cvjetkovich made his debut in Total Nonstop Action Wrestling on August 13, 2003, under the name "Sinn", participating in a six-man tag team match, teaming with Devon Storm and Vampire Warrior, but lost the match. He then joined a stable called The Disciples of the New Church, led by Father James Mitchell. The group engaged in a long running feud in 2003 against Raven and his "Gathering", with the teams participating in many hardcore matches between them. In a Dog Collar match on September 24, The New Church lost to The Gathering, but hung the members of The Gathering from the ceiling with chains afterwards. Sinn's final appearance for TNA was in March 2004, with a loss in a tag team tournament with his tag team partner Slash to the team of Kid Kash and Dallas. Cvjetkovich returned for two more appearances with TNA in late 2005 teaming with Helvis (Elvis Elliot) as "The Beasts of Burden". On March 5, 2013, Slash and Sinn appeared at TNA Hardcore Justice 2. The Disciples of the New Church were defeated by the Latin American Xchange (Hernandez & Homicide).

=== World Wrestling Entertainment (2006–2009) ===
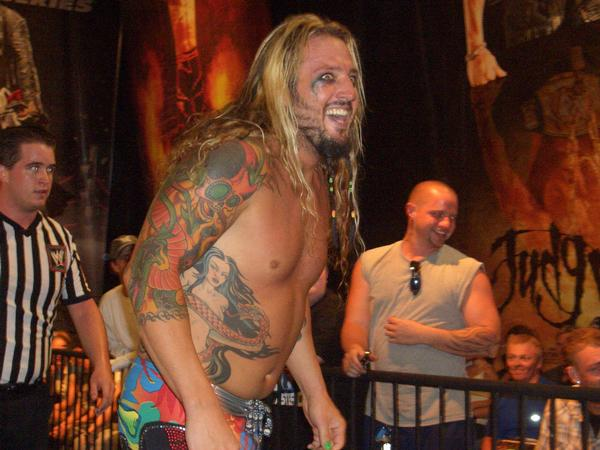
Sinn Bowdee in FCW

In late 2004, Cvjetkovich wrestled a number of dark matches for World Wrestling Entertainment. Debuting for WWE's developmental territory Ohio Valley Wrestling in December 2006, Cvjetkovich wrestled a number of matches which continued into the summer of 2007, at the suggestion of Al Snow, in hopes of earning a developmental contract with World Wrestling Entertainment. Cvjetkovich was signed to a WWE developmental contract on July 12, 2007. With WWE starting to shift its developmental territory to the newly formed Florida Championship Wrestling, Cvjetkovich reported there instead of OVW. On October 13, 2007, Cvjetkovich made his FCW debut under the name Sinn Bowdee, losing to Mariousz Jablonski. While in FCW, Cvjetkovich wrestled and feuded with several wrestlers that later achieved success in WWE such as Evan Bourne, Jack Swagger, Justin Gabriel, Kofi Kingston and Sheamus. Bodhi continued to wrestle in FCW even after his debut on the main roster.

On the October 10, 2008, edition of SmackDown, vignettes promoting the debut of Cvjetkovich, now under the ring name Kizarny, began to air. He later described his character as being as "if Jake "The Snake" Roberts and Doink produced a lovechild." During the vignettes, he spoke in carny talk, with additional vignettes airing during the next few weeks. He also competed in dark matches before SmackDown tapings, defeating Ryan Braddock and Curt Hawkins. Kizarny made his in-ring televised WWE debut on the January 2, 2009 episode of SmackDown, defeating Montel Vontavious Porter. Kizarny later reappeared in an Elimination Chamber qualifying battle royal but was eliminated early in the match. In his last appearance on WWE TV, Kizarny appeared in a backstage segment involving Vickie Guerrero and Edge on the February 20, 2009, episode of SmackDown.

On March 9, 2009, Kizarny was released by WWE.

=== Return to the independent circuit (2009–present) ===
Cvjetkovich made an appearance for the World Wrestling Council after his release from WWE and had hopes to tour Japan which never materialized. Sinn would compete in Florida Underground Wrestling, while there Sinn would take on FUW's best talents, such as NVUS (Dakota Darsow & Kennedy Kendrick), Eddie Taurus, and 666lbs Tweedle Die, who Sinn mentored and defeated. Starting on June 18, Cvjetkovich was part of the Jim Rose Circus vs. Jake "The Snake" Roberts tour, which featured sideshow circus acts competing with professional wrestling in a battle to top one another. Cvjetkovich was in the main event each night, wrestling Roberts. He has also appeared on the Louisville, Kentucky–based OVW on the September 4, 2010, episode along with his valet Stacy Carter. On January 29, 2011, Cvjetkovich made his debut for Pro Wrestling Guerrilla (PWG), during the WrestleReunion 5 weekend, and was defeated by Jake Roberts in what was billed as Roberts' retirement match. In April 2013, he won the 55 man casino battle royal at Vendetta Pro Wrestling.

=== Chikara (2010–2011, 2013–2020) ===
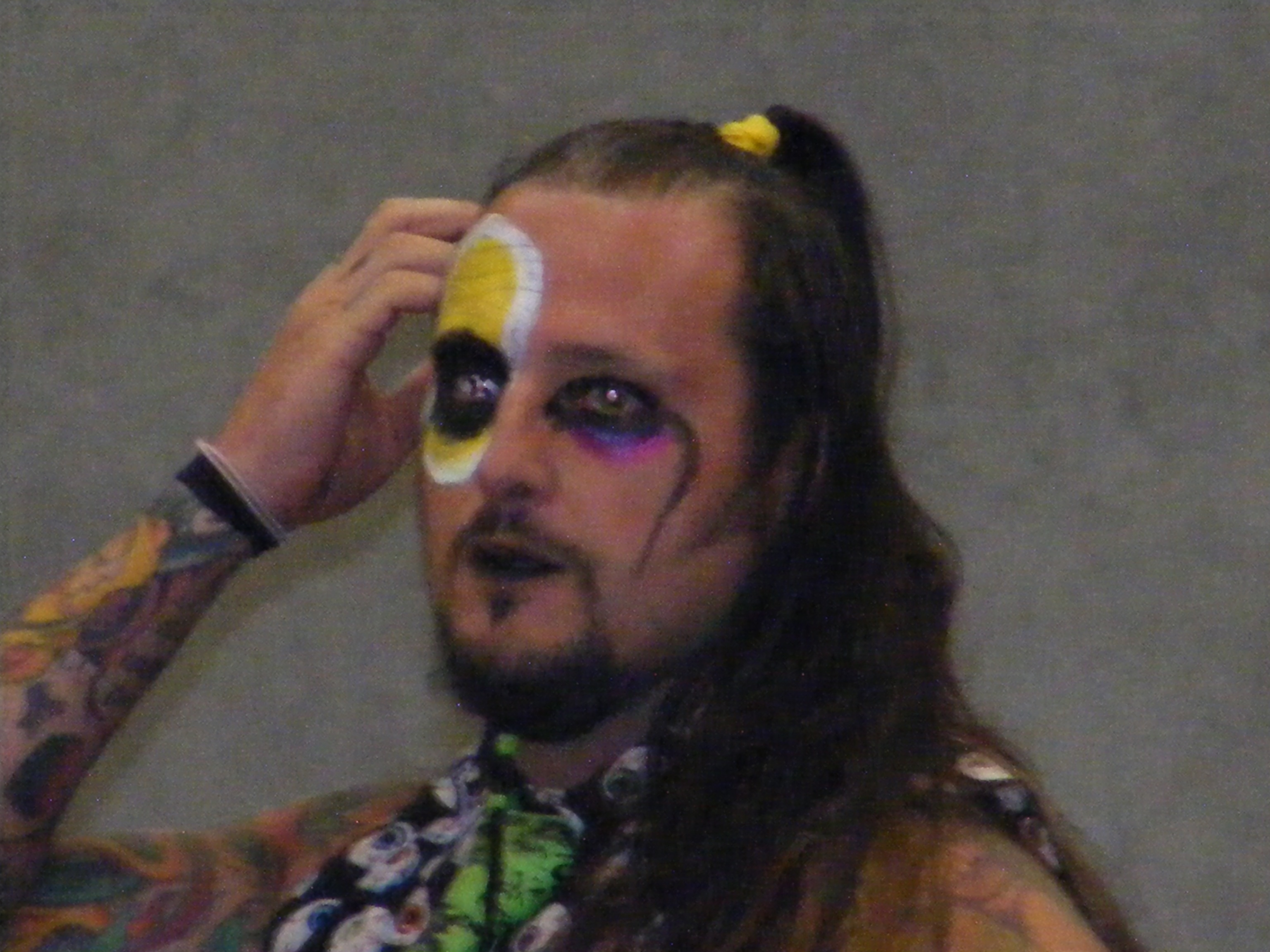
Sinn Bodhi in July 2011

On November 21, 2010, Cvjetkovich made his debut for Chikara, appearing during a match between UltraMantis Black and Ares, summoning UltraMantis' allies Obariyon and Kodama away from the ring as they were trying to help their leader in his battle against not only Ares, but also his BDK stable mate Tursas. Cvjetkovich worked the appearance under a cloak and never revealed his true identity. During his second appearance at Chikara's season nine finale Reality is Relative on December 12, 2010, Cvjetkovich revealed his identity as Sinn Bodhi and demanded that UltraMantis Black hand him the Eye of Tyr. When UltraMantis was unable to produce the artifact, Bodhi led Obariyon, Kodama and a third masked man, who was later named Kobald, into an attack on UltraMantis, who was then saved by Hallowicked and Frightmare. UltraMantis later revealed that he had asked for Bodhi's help in training Obariyon, Kodama and Kobald for his battle against BDK, but never agreed to give him the Eye of Tyr. On January 23, 2011, at the season ten premiere, Bodhi wrestled his first Chikara match, losing to UltraMantis Black via disqualification, following interference from Kodama and Obariyon. On March 13 Bodhi defeated UltraMantis in a rematch. On April 15, Bodhi, Kodama and Obariyon entered the 2011 King of Trios, but were eliminated from the tournament in the first round by The Colony (Fire Ant, Green Ant and Soldier Ant). Bodhi was also involved in controversy at KOT due to comments he made during the pre-show which some took to be related to the recent death of Larry Sweeney. Bodhi later apologized for the promo. On September 18, Bodhi and his Dark Army (Kobald, Kodama and Obariyon) faced UltraMantis Black and his Spectral Envoy (Crossbones, Frightmare and Hallowicked) in an eight-man tag team match, which ended with UltraMantis pinning Bodhi for the win. Bodhi's feud with UltraMantis Black came to an end at the High Noon pay-per-view, where UltraMantis handed him the Eye of Tyr (which was later revealed to be a fake replica) and resulted in Bodhi proclaiming that he was now done with Chikara.

In the wake of Chikara's destruction at Aniversario: Never Compromise, Sinn Bohdi and the Odditorium returned to destroy satellite promotion Wrestling is Art His group later joined with the Flood, an army of former Chikara rudos, to crush Chikara's final remnants at National Pro Wrestling Day 2014, only to be fought off. The Odditorium fought against the Batiri in the return Chikara event, You Only Live Twice where they lost via disqualification from a blatant low blow. They later were part of another Chikara vs. Flood brawl after the final match, which saw Kobold (kayfabe) killed. In June 2020, Chikara closed.

=== Freakshow Wrestling (2011–present) ===
Created by Bodhi, the first live episode took place in Las Vegas, Nevada on April 28, 2011. Freakshow Wrestling is a variety stunt show featuring magicians (Amazing Johnathan, Bizzaro, Shocker), rock bands (Radioactive Chicken Heads, Tartar Control, Rosemary's Billygoat), sideshow performers (Brianna Belledonna, Gracie Psycho, Karen DeLa Kreep, Scorch The Clown, Sleazo The Clown, Staysha Randall, Jenn O. Cide, George The Giant, Swingshift Sideshow) and pro wrestling with characters like Andrea the Giant, Drugz Bunny, "The Demi-God Of Death" Funny Bone, Black Annie, Cereal Man, Willie Mack and the controversial Gaydolf Hitler. Freakshow Wrestling has featured former WWE stars: Brutus "The Barber" Beefcake, Adam Rose, The Boogeyman, John Morrison, D'lo Brown, Cody Rhodes, P. J. Black, Chavo Guerrero Jr., Brian Kendrick, Dr. Tom Prichard, Gangrel, Jake "The Snake" Roberts, Katarina Waters, Nick Dinsmore, Rikishi, Shelly Martinez, Kevin Sullivan and one of the original members of Gwar, Techno Destructo.

=== Fantasy Slam and Snake Pit Pro Wrestling Academy (2017–present) ===
Created in May 2017 by Cvjetkovich and Kevin Lepine, Fantasy Slam was a pro wrestling fantasy camp where fans can actually get into the ring with professional wrestlers and live out their dreams of being in the squared circle while in a safe and fun environment. Fantasy Slam was coached by Sinn Bodhi and D'lo Brown and each camp was headlined by a different wrestling legend. The first camp was held May 2 through 4th with guest legend Ricky The Dragon Steamboat. The Snake Pit was coached by Jake "The Snake" Roberts, D'lo Brown and Sinn Bodhi. It is no longer in operation.

== Other media ==
=== Filmography ===
- Enter... Zombie King (2002) as The Zombie King
- Killjoy Goes To Hell (2012) stunts
- Unlucky Charms (2012) PA
- Gingerdead Man vs Evil Bong (2013) Art dept
- Something Strange (2016) Bell Fibetv
- Teddy Told Me To (2022) Warlord of Weird

=== Author ===
Cvjetkovich was the writer, artist, and publisher of the Fred the Possessed Flower comic book series (1999–2000). With his brother Steven, he wrote a comedy-horror novel called Between Chapters, which was self-published in September 2000. The Cvjetkovich brothers have variously published as Happy Predator Press and Happy Predator Publications.

=== Tattoo artist ===
Since July 2012 Cvjetkovich has been a tattoo artist at Las Vegas Tattoo Company located in Tampa Florida, Precious Slut Tattoo Co in Las Vegas and Dermagraph Ink in Los Angeles.

== Personal life ==
Cvjetkovich is the childhood friend of two wrestlers, Edge and Christian. While growing up, as stated in Edge's book, Cvjetkovich was referred to as "Fatty" by Edge and Christian. Cvjetkovich is a protégé and close friend of Jake Roberts. Cvjetkovich's brother, Steven, is also a professional wrestler. He performs under the ring name Kobra Kai and was a mainstay in the Canada-based Blood, Sweat and Ears promotion. On August 2, 2010, Cvjetkovich married former professional wrestler Stacy Carter in St. Petersburg, Florida, on the beach in front of many family and friends. Cvjetkovich's younger brother Stevan and Adam Copeland (Edge) both stood as best men. "The Mouth Of The South" Jimmy Hart gave Stacy Carter away in the ceremony. They divorced in 2013.

Cvjetkovich became a naturalized US Citizen in February, 2023.

== Championships and accomplishments ==
=== Martial arts ===
- Karate
  - Black belt

=== Professional wrestling ===
- All Canadian Wrestling
  - ACW Heavyweight Championship (1 time)
- Championship International Wrestling
  - CIW Tag Team Championship (1 time) – with Elvis Elliot
- Cauliflower Alley Club
  - Men's Wrestling Award (2015)
- Destiny Wrestling Organization
  - DWO Tag Team Championship (1 time) – with Hobo Hank
- Devotion Championship Wrestling
  - DCW Core Championship (1 time)
- Independent Wrestling Revolution
  - IWR Tag Team Championship (1 time) – with Elvis Elliot
- NWA Bluegrass
  - NWA Bluegrass Heavyweight Championship (1 time)
- Northwest Pro Wrestling
  - NWP Heavyweight Championship (1 time)
- Ohio Valley Wrestling
  - OVW Anarchy Championship (1 time)
- Power Precision Pro Wrestling Alliance
  - 3PWA Heavyweight Championship (1 time)
- Pro Wrestling Illustrated
  - Ranked No. 223 of the best 500 singles wrestlers in the PWI 500 in 2007
- Rocket City Championship Wrestling
  - RCCW World Heavyweight Championship (1 time)
- Universal Championship Wrestling
  - UCW World Heavyweight Championship (1 time)
- Vendetta Pro Wrestling
  - Cauliflower Alley Cup (2013)
- West Coast Wrestling Connection
  - WCWC Tag Team Championship (2 time) – with Gangrel
