= Guerra de Dinastías =

2019 International Wrestling Revolution Group event

- Date: January 31, 2019
- City: Naucalpan, State of Mexico
- Venue: Arena Naucalpan

Event chronology
← Previous; Zona de Ejecucion	Next → El Protector

Guerra de Familias chronology
← Previous; 2015	Next → —

The Guerra de Dinastías (literally "War of the Dynasties", or "War of the Families") show is a major lucha libre supercard show produced and scripted by Mexican professional wrestling promotion International Wrestling Revolution Group (IWRG). The show was sanctioned by Promotores Asociados de Lucha Libre ("Wrestling Promoters Association"; PALL) and took place on January 31, 2019, in Arena Naucalpan, Naucalpan, State of Mexico, Mexico. The top matches were shown live on the +LuchaTV YouTube channel.

In the main event the Guerrero brothers (Gran Guerrero and Último Guerrero) defeated the Luna brothers (Sharlie Rockstar and Mr. Electro), with the Guerreros being special guests from the Consejo Mundial de Lucha Libre (CMLL). Further down the card father/son team of El Solar and El Solar Jr. defeated Blue Panther and Black Panther. The show also featured several members of the Montañez, supposedly French Mixed Martial Arts fighters, including Francois Montañez defeating Dr. Cerebro in a Luchas de Apuestas ("bet match"), Jean and Pierre winning the TWS Caribbean Tag Team Championship and Kevin and Portos Montañez winning the second match of the night.

== Event ==
The Guerra de Dinastías event featured seven professional wrestling matches with different wrestlers involved in pre-existing scripted feuds, plots and storylines. Wrestlers were portrayed as either heels (referred to as rudos in Mexico, those that portray the "bad guys") or faces (técnicos in Mexico, the "good guy" characters) as they followed a series of tension-building events, which culminated in a wrestling match or series of matches.

== Matches ==
No.	Results	Stipulations
1	Machete and El Mara defeated Príncipe Barush and Mr. Ángel.	tag team match
2	Kevin and Portos Montañez defeated Saku and Factor Miedo	tag team match
3	Mexica and Chef Benito defeated Death Metal and Neza Kid	tag team match
4	Ludark Shaitan, Stephanie Vaquer, Mary Caporal, and Diosa Atena defeated Kaho Kobashi, Quimera, Lolita and Dulce Luna	Eight-woman tag team match
5	El Solar and Solar Jr. defeated Los Divinos Laguneros (Blue Panther and Black Panther)	"Father and son" tag team match
6	Ricky Marvin and Los Masters Juniors (Herodes Jr., El Hijo de Pirata Morgan, and Hijo de Sangre Chicana) defeated El Hijo de Alebrije, Relámpago, Aramís, and El Mosca	Eight-man tag team match
7	Hermanos Montañez (Jean and Pierre Montañez) defeated Heddi Karaoui and Zumbi (c)	Tag team match for the TWS Caribbean Tag Team Championship
8	Francois Montañez defeated Dr. Cerebro	Lucha de Apuestas, hair (Dr. Cerebro) vs. mask (Montañez)
9	Los Guerreros Laguneros (Gran Guerrero and Último Guerrero) defeated Mr. Electro and Sharly Rockstar	Tag team match
(c) / – the champion(s) heading into the match
