= IWRG Máscara vs. Cabellera (March 2019) =

2019 International Wrestling Revolution Group event

- Official poster for the event, depicting main event participants Oficial AK-47, Cerebro Negro, Drágon Bane and Death Metal
- Date: March 3, 2019
- City: Naucalpan, State of Mexico
- Venue: Arena Naucalpan

Event chronology
← Previous; El Protector	Next → Guerra del Golfo

IWRG Lucha de Apuestas chronology
← Previous; July 2018	Next → —

The IWRG Máscaras vs. Cabellera (March 2019) (Spanish for "Mask vs. Hair") show was a major lucha libre event produced and scripted by Mexican professional wrestling promotion International Wrestling Revolution Group (IWRG), that took place on March 3, 2019, in Arena Naucalpan, Naucalpan, State of Mexico, Mexico. The focal point of the "Máscaras vs. Cabellera" series of shows is one or more traditional Lucha de Apuestas, or "Bet matches", where all competitors in the match risk their mask or hair on the outcome of the match. The Lucha de Apuestas is considered the most prestigious match type in lucha libre, especially when a wrestlers mask is on the line, but the "hair vs. hair" stipulation is held in almost as high regard.

The main event of the March 2019 Máscara vs. Cabellera event Drágon Bane and Death Metal put their masks on the line while Cerebro Negro and Oficial AK-47 put their hair on the line. Because Drágon Bane pinned Oficial AK-47, AK-47 was forced to have all his hair shaved off as a result of the loss, The show included six additional matches,

== Production ==
=== Background ===
In Lucha libre the wrestling mask holds a sacred place, with the most anticipated and prestigious matches being those where a wrestler's mask is on the line, a so-called Lucha de Apuestas, or "bet match" where the loser would be forced to unmask in the middle of the ring and state their birth name. Winning a mask is considered a bigger accomplishment in lucha libre than winning a professional wrestling championship and usually draws more people and press coverage. Losing a mask is often a watershed moment in a wrestler's career, they give up the mystique and prestige of being an enmascarado (masked wrestler) but usually come with a higher than usual payment from the promoter. By the same token a wrestler betting his hair in a Lucha de Apuestas is seen as highly prestigious, usually a step below the mask match.

=== Storylines ===
The event featured seven professional wrestling matches with different wrestlers involved in pre-existing scripted feuds, plots and storylines. Wrestlers were portrayed as either heels (referred to as rudos in Mexico, those that portray the "bad guys") or faces (técnicos in Mexico, the "good guy" characters) as they followed a series of tension-building events, which culminated in a wrestling match or series of matches.

== Results ==
No.	Results	Stipulations
1	Latino and Puma de Oro defeated Güero Palma and Neza Kid	Tag team match
2	Toto defeated Tackle	Singles match
3	Auzter and Barba Blanca defeated Dinamic Black and Eragón	Tag Team match
4	Heddi Karaoui, and Las Tortugas Negras (Ra-Zhata and Shil-Ka) defeated El Diablo Jr., El Hijo del Alebrije, and Relámpago	Six-man tag team match
5	El Hijo de Canis Lupus defeated Aramís	Singles match
6	Los Demonios Eternal (Demonio Infernal, Eterno, and Lunatic Xtreme) defeated Los Indeseables (Ángel Tormenta, Rokambole Jr., and Villano V Jr.) by disqualification	Six-man tag team match
7	Dragón Bane (mask) defeated Oficial AK-47 (hair); Also in the match Cerebro Negro (hair) and Death Metal (mask)	Four-way Lucha de Apuestas, mask vs. hair match
