= Toxin (wrestler) =

Mexican professional wrestler

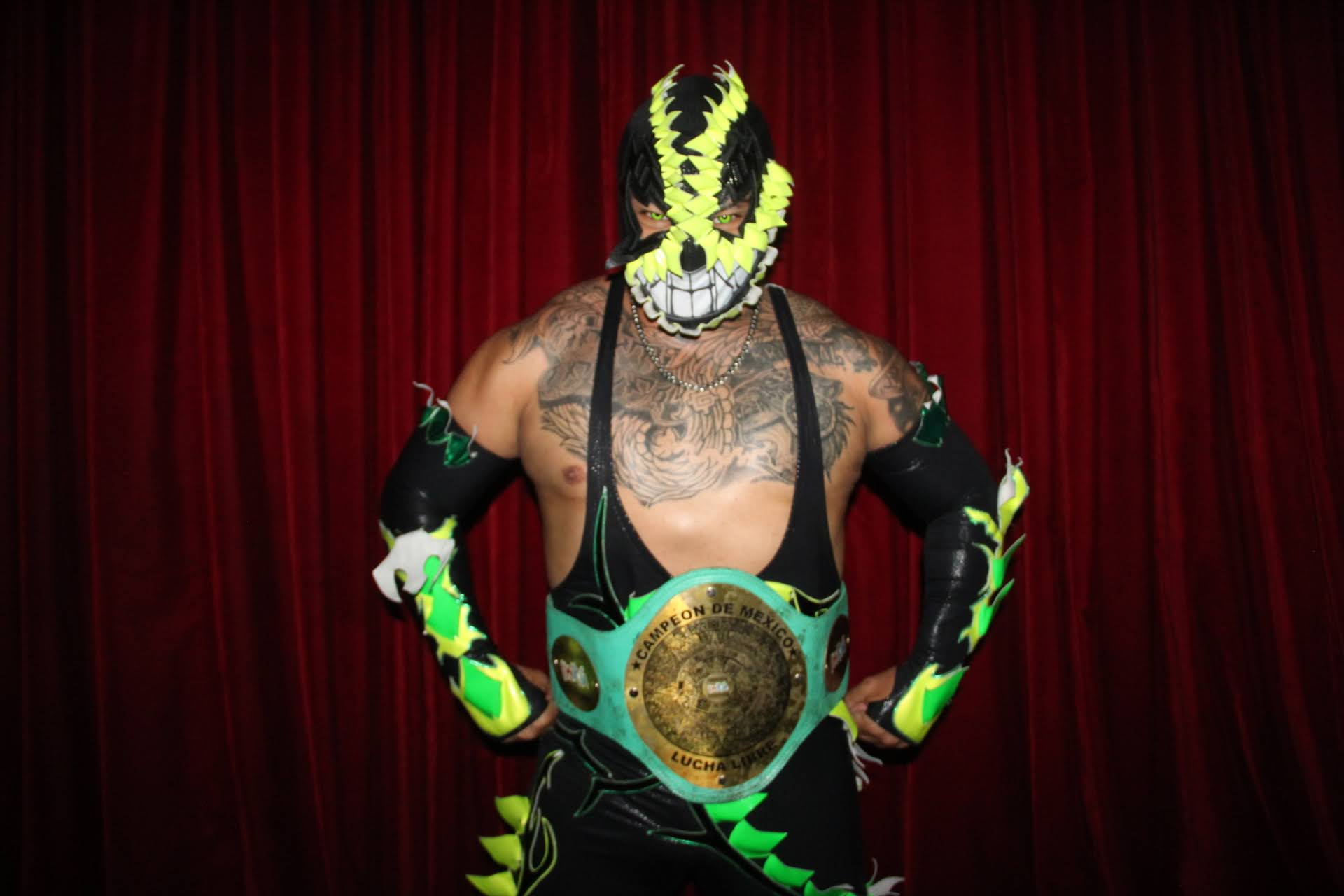
- Toxin in 2020.

Personal information
- Born: January 27, 1997 (age 29) Naucalpan, Mexico

Professional wrestling career
- Ring names: Toxin; Toxin Boy
- Trained by: Mike Segura; Freelance; Oficial 911
- Debut: October 26, 2013

Toxin (born January 27, 1997), previously known by his ring name Toxin Boy, is a masked Mexican professional wrestler. He is known for his time with promotion Lucha Libre AAA Worldwide (AAA) as a freelancer and the independent circuit in Mexico and the United States. In AAA, he is a former AAA World Trios Champion. In IWRG, Toxin is the inaugural IWRG Mexico Champion. His birth name is not a matter of public record, which is a strong tradition for masked wrestlers in Mexico, where their private lives are concealed from professional wrestling fans.

== Professional wrestling career ==
On January 1, 2020, Toxin won the inaugural IWRG Mexico Championship in a ladder match involving five other professional wrestlers. October 9, 2021 at Héroes Inmortales XIV, the Los Nuevos Vipers group was formed, which consisted of Toxin, Látigo, Abismo Negro Jr., Arez, Chik Tormenta and with Psicosis as a mentor. On July 21, 2023, at Verano de Escándalo, Toxin, Abismo Negro Jr. and Psicosis won the AAA World Trios Championship by defeating Nueva Generación Dinamita. On March 6, 2024, he left AAA.

== Championships and accomplishments ==
- Lucha Libre AAA Worldwide
  - AAA World Trios Championship (1 time) – with Abismo Negro Jr. and Psicosis
- International Wrestling Revolution Group
  - IWRG Intercontinental Middleweight Championship (1 time, current)
  - IWRG Intercontinental Tag Team Championship (1 time) – with Látigo
  - IWRG Intercontinental Trios Championship (1 time) – with Arez and Látigo
  - IWRG Mexico Championship (1 time)
- International Wrestling Courage
  - IWC Junior Championship (1 time)
- Kamicazes Del Ring
  - KDR Universal Championship (1 time, final)
- Kaoz Lucha Libre
  - Kaoz Cruiserweight Championship (1 time)

== Luchas de Apuestas record ==
Winner (wager)	Loser (wager)	Location	Event	Date	Notes
Toxin (mask)	Atomic Star (hair)	Naucalpan, State of Mexico	Live event	October 15, 2015	
Toxin (mask)	Fly Star (mask)	Ciudad Nezahualcoyotl, State of Mexico	Live event	August 4, 2018	
