= List of House of Hardcore events =

This is a list of events held and promoted by House of Hardcore, a professional wrestling promotion based in the United States. HOH's first event, "House of Hardcore I", took place on October 6, 2012, in Poughkeepsie, New York at the Mid-Hudson Civic Center, while the company's final event before closure House of Hardcore 57: Blizzard Brawl "Challenge of The SuperFriends" took place on December 7, 2019, at the Waukesha County Expo in Waukesha, Wisconsin.

== List of events ==
Name	Date	Venue	City	Main event
House of Hardcore	October 6, 2012	Mid-Hudson Civic Center	Poughkeepsie, New York	Tommy Dreamer vs. Carlito Colon vs. Mike Knoxx
House of Hardcore 2	June 22, 2013	National Guard Armory	Philadelphia, Pennsylvania	Tommy Dreamer vs. Lance Storm
House of Hardcore 3	November 9, 2013	Mid-Hudson Civic Center	Poughkeepsie, New York	Tommy Dreamer and Terry Funk vs. Lance Storm and Sean Waltman
House of Hardcore IV	June 6, 2014	Mid-Hudson Civic Center	Poughkeepsie, New York	Tommy Dreamer and Devon vs. Abyss and Rhino
House of Hardcore V	June 7, 2014	National Guard Armory	Philadelphia, Pennsylvania	A.J. Styles vs. Kevin Steen
House of Hardcore VI	June 14, 2014	Harrah's Resort Southern California	Valley Center, California	The Young Bucks (Matt & Nick Jackson) vs. Bad Influence (Christopher Daniels & Frankie Kazarian)
House of Hardcore VII	November 15, 2014	2300 Arena	Philadelphia, Pennsylvania	The Young Bucks (Matt & Nick Jackson) vs. The Hardys (Jeff & Matt Hardy)
House of Hardcore 8	March 7, 2015	2300 Arena	Philadelphia, Pennsylvania	The Young Bucks (Matt & Nick Jackson) vs. Dirty Heels (Bobby Roode & Austin Aries)
House of Hardcore 9	July 18, 2015	Ted Reeve Arena	Toronto, Ontario, Canada	Team 3D (Bully Ray & Devon) vs. The Young Bucks (Matt & Nick Jackson)
House of Hardcore 10	November 13, 2015	2300 Arena	Philadelphia, Pennsylvania	Tommy Dreamer and Yoshihiro Tajiri vs. Ethan Carter III and Eric Young
House of Hardcore 11	November 14, 2015	Elmcor Center	Queens, New York	The Wolves (Davey Richards & Eddie Edwards) vs. Dirty Heels (Austin Aries & Bobby Roode)
House of Hardcore 12	April 15, 2016	Elmcor Center	Queens, New York	Rob Van Dam vs. Chris Hero
House of Hardcore 13	April 16, 2016	2300 Arena	Philadelphia, Pennsylvania	Rob Van Dam vs. Rhino
House of Hardcore 14	May 7, 2016	Scotiabank Convention Centre	Niagara Falls, Ontario, Canada	Bobby Roode vs. Eric Young
House of Hardcore 15	June 22, 2016	Whitehorse Club	Burwood East, Victoria, Australia	Carlito Colón vs. Andy Phoenix vs. KrackerJak vs. Tommy Dreamer
House of Hardcore 16	August 6, 2016	Pasadena Convention Center	Pasadena, Texas	Mickie James and Tommy Dreamer vs. Cherry Bomb & Pepper Parks
House of Hardcore 17	September 16, 2016	The Sports Arena	St. James, New York	Rhino vs. Tommy Dreamer
House of Hardcore 18	September 17, 2016	2300 Arena	Philadelphia, Pennsylvania	"Broken" Matt Hardy vs. Tommy Dreamer
House of Hardcore 19	October 14, 2016	The Odeon	Cleveland, Ohio	Ethan Carter III vs. Rhino vs. Tommy Dreamer
House of Hardcore 20	October 15, 2016	Court Time Sports Center	Elizabeth, Pennsylvania	Rhino vs. Sami Callihan
House of Hardcore 21: Blizzard Brawl	December 3, 2016	Waukesha County Expo	Waukesha, Wisconsin	Al Snow and Dave Herro vs. Abyss and Damien Nelson
House of Hardcore 22	December 16, 2016	2300 Arena	Philadelphia, Pennsylvania	"Broken" Matt Hardy vs. Tommy Dreamer
House of Hardcore 23	December 17, 2016	MCW Arena	Joppa, Maryland	Fénix vs. John Hennigan
House of Hardcore 24	April 21, 2017	Metuchen Sportsplex	Metuchen, New Jersey	Bully Ray & Tommy Dreamer vs. The Squad (Kenny & Mikey)
House of Hardcore 25	April 22, 2017	2300 Arena	Philadelphia, Pennsylvania	Penta el Zero M vs. Sami Callihan
House of Hardcore 26	May 21, 2017	The Sports Arena	St. James, New York	Cody Rhodes vs. Tommy Dreamer
House of Hardcore 27	June 16, 2017	Brisbane Exhibition Ground	Bowen Hills, Queensland, Australia	The Young Bucks vs. The Squad
House of Hardcore 28	June 17, 2017	Sydney Showground	Sydney, New South Wales, Australia	The Young Bucks vs. Billy Gunn & Tommy Dreamer
House of Hardcore 29	June 18, 2017	Cyril Jackson Rec Centre	Bassendean, Western Australia	The Young Bucks vs. The Squad
House of Hardcore 30	June 23, 2017	Whitehorse Club	Burwood East, Victoria, Australia	MVP vs. Jake Hager vs. Tommy Dreamer
House of Hardcore 31	June 24, 2017	Marion Leisure & Fitness Centre	Marion, South Australia	MVP & Tommy Dreamer vs. The Squad
House of Hardcore 32	August 11, 2017	iPlay America	Freehold, New Jersey	MVP vs. Jake Hager vs. Tommy Dreamer
House of Hardcore 33	August 12, 2017	2300 Arena	Philadelphia, Pennsylvania	Sami Callihan vs. Jeff Cobb
House of Hardcore 34	November 17, 2017	The Sports Arena	St. James, New York	Tommy Dreamer, Shane Douglas, Little Guido and Super Crazy vs. Joey Mercury, Nick Aldis and The Squad
House of Hardcore 35	November 18, 2017	2300 Arena	Philadelphia, Pennsylvania	Tommy Dreamer vs Joey Mercury
House of Hardcore 36: Blizzard Brawl Homecoming	December 2, 2017	Waukesha County Expo	Waukesha, Wisconsin	Austin Aries vs. Joey Mercury
House of Hardcore 37	January 26, 2018	2300 Arena	Philadelphia, Pennsylvania	Brian Cage vs. Sami Callihan
House of Hardcore 38	March 23, 2018	The Sports Arena	St. James, New York	Brian Cage vs. Sami Callihan vs. Willie Mack
House of Hardcore 39	March 24, 2018	2300 Arena	Philadelphia, Pennsylvania	Tommy Dreamer vs. Nick Aldis
House of Hardcore 40	April 7, 2018	The Sugar Mill	New Orleans, Louisiana	Sami Callihan vs. Willie Mack vs. Alex Reynolds
House of Hardcore 41	April 28, 2018	Grand Wayne Convention Center	Fort Wayne, Indiana	Eddie Edwards vs Sami Callihan
House of Hardcore 42	May 18, 2018	Starland Sportsplex	Hanover, Massachusetts	Eddie Edwards vs Sami Callihan
House of Hardcore 43	May 19, 2018	2300 Arena	Philadelphia, Pennsylvania	Willie Mack vs Sami Callihan
House of Hardcore 44	June 1, 2018	Lennox Agricultural Memorial Community Centre	Napanee, Ontario, Canada	Willie Mack vs Alex Reynolds vs Maxwell Jacob Friedman
House of Hardcore 45	June 2, 2018	Massena Arena	Massena, New York	Willie Mack vs Pepper Parks
House of Hardcore 46	July 11, 2018	Gate One Theatre at Claremont Showground	Claremont, Western Australia	
House of Hardcore 47	July 13, 2018	Melbourne Pavilion	Kensington, Victoria, Australia	Willie Mack vs Andy Phoenix vs JXT vs Slade Mercer
House of Hardcore 48	July 14, 2018	Hurstville Entertainment Centre	Hurstville, New South Wales, Australia	Bully Ray, Tommy Dreamer and Swoggle vs Squad World Order
House of Hardcore 49	July 15, 2018	The Shed at Aussie World	Palmview, Queensland, Australia	Willie Mack vs Andy Phoenix
House of Hardcore 50	September 3, 2018	DeVault Vineyards	Concord, Virginia	Tommy Dreamer vs Sami Callihan
House of Hardcore 51: Blizzard Brawl-For It All	December 1, 2018	Waukesha County Expo	Waukesha, Wisconsin	Willie Mack vs. Sami Callihan
House of Hardcore 52	December 8, 2018	2300 Arena	Philadelphia, Pennsylvania	Willie Mack vs. Shane Strickland
House of Hardcore For Charity	December 15, 2018	Woodbridge High School	Woodbridge, New Jersey	Tommy Dreamer and Robert Strauss vs Damian Adams and Byson
House of Hardcore 53	June 1, 2019	Tennessee State Fairground Sports Arena	Nashville, Tennessee	Rock 'n' Roll Express (Ricky Morton & Robert Gibson) vs SoCal Uncensored (Christopher Daniels & Frankie Kazarian)
House of Hardcore 54	June 8, 2019	2300 Arena	Philadelphia, Pennsylvania	The Great Muta and Tommy Dreamer vs Johnny Impact and Michael Elgin
House of Hardcore 55	June 9, 2019	The Sports Arena	St. James, New York	Tommy Dreamer, Billy Gunn and Jordynne Grace vs Johnny Impact, Moose and Taya Valkyrie
House of Hardcore Chinlock For Charity	June 15, 2019	Leon's Centre	Kingston, Ontario, Canada	Tommy Dreamer & Billy Gunn vs Tyson Dux & Tarik The Great
House of Hardcore 56	November 23, 2019	2300 Arena	Philadelphia, Pennsylvania	Willie Mack vs Jacob Fatu
House of Hardcore 57: Blizzard Brawl	December 7, 2019	Waukesha County Expo	Waukesha, Wisconsin	Jacob Fatu and Sefa Fatu vs Davey Boy Smith Jr. and Mr. Anderson

== Results ==
=== House of Hardcore ===
House of Hardcore
- Promotion: House of Hardcore
- Date: October 6, 2012
- City: Poughkeepsie, New York
- Venue: Mid-Hudson Civic Center
- Attendance: 1,950

Event chronology
← Previous; First	Next → House of Hardcore 2

The inaugural House of Hardcore was held in Poughkeepsie, New York at the Mid-Hudson Civic Center with an attendance of 1,950 people. The founder of House of Hardcore Tommy Dreamer would take on Carlito Colón and Mike Knoxx in the main event for the FWE Championship. The show also included special appearances by Spike Dudley, Rick Steiner, Adam Copeland, Raven and The Sandman. Maryse Ouellet and Thea Trinidad were in attendance for the pre-show meet & greet. Commentary was provided by Vic Travagliante, Jordan Schneider and (After match 4) Winter.

No.	Results	Stipulations	Times
1	Shawn Daivari defeated Crowbar	Singles match	9:27
2	Danny Doring and Roadkill (w/ Smith James) defeated The FBI (Guido Maritato & Tony Mamaluke) (w/ Big Sal E. Graziano)	Tag team match	9:15
3	Jazz defeated Winter	Singles match	7:54
4	Tony Nese defeated Alex Reynolds	Singles match with Mikey Whipwreck as the special guest referee	10:43
5	Scott Steiner defeated Big XLG (w/ Eddie Kingston)	Singles match	8:28
6	Chris Mordetzky vs. Hale Collins ended in a no-contest	Masterlock Challenge	0:56
7	Chris Modetzky defeated Hale Collins	Singles match	7:20
8	Rhino defeated Sami Callihan	Singles match	16:21
9	Big Daddy V (w/ Nicky Benz) defeated Jonathan Redbeard	Singles match	0:50
10	Big Daddy V (w/ Nicky Benz) defeated "Mint" Mike Mitchell	Singles match	1:25
11	Paul London and Brian Kendrick defeated The Young Bucks (Matt & Nick Jackson)	Tag team match	19:04
12	Carlito Colón defeated Tommy Dreamer (c) and Mike Knoxx	3-Way match for the FWE Heavyweight Championship	12:46
(c) / – the champion(s) heading into the match

=== House of Hardcore 2 ===
House of Hardcore 2
- Promotion: House of Hardcore
- Date: June 22, 2013
- City: Philadelphia, Pennsylvania
- Venue: National Guard Armory

Event chronology
← Previous; House of Hardcore	Next → House of Hardcore 3

House of Hardcore 2 was held in Philadelphia, Pennsylvania at the National Guard Armory. The founder of House of Hardcore Tommy Dreamer would take on Lance Storm in the main event, a feud that had been building up over Twitter. The show included special appearances by Spike Dudley, The Blue Meanie, The Sandman and Sean Waltman. Ric Flair and J. J. Dillon signed autographs before the show. Commentary was provided by Vic Travagliante, Jordan Schneider and Danny Doring.

No.	Results	Stipulations	Times
1^{D}	Danny Doring, Joe Caldo and Roberto Castillo defeated Harley Cruise, Jonathan Redbeard and CJ Mirror	Tag team match	—
2^{D}	Ben "The Beast" Ortiz defeated "Mint" Mike Mitchell	Singles match	—
3	Crowbar defeated Hale Collins	Singles match	7:23
4	Vik Dalishus (w/ Larry Dallas and Monique Dupree) defeated Guido Maritato	Singles match	5:05
5	MVP defeated Sami Callihan	Singles match	17:09
6	Carlito Colón (w/ Thea Trinidad) defeated Michael Bennett (w/ Maria Kanellis)	Singles match	7:48
7	Petey Williams defeated Alex Reynolds and Tony Nese	Three way elimination match	11:39
8	The Steiner Brothers (Rick Steiner & Scott Steiner) defeated Outlaw Inc. (Eddie Kingston & Homicide)	Tag team match	6:51
9	John Morrison (c) defeated 2 Cold Scorpio	Singles match for the FWE Heavyweight Championship	23:18
10	The Young Bucks (Matt & Nick Jackson) defeated Paul London and Brian Kendrick	Tag team match	16:43
11	Tommy Dreamer (w/ Terry Funk) defeated Lance Storm	Singles match	17:41
(c) / – the champion(s) heading into the match; D / – this was a dark match

=== House of Hardcore 3 ===
House of Hardcore 3
- Promotion: House of Hardcore
- Date: November 9, 2013 (aired November 11, 2018)
- City: Poughkeepsie, New York
- Venue: Mid-Hudson Civic Center

Event chronology
← Previous; House of Hardcore 2	Next → House of Hardcore IV

House of Hardcore 3 was held in Poughkeepsie, New York at the Mid-Hudson Civic Center. The founder of House of Hardcore Tommy Dreamer and Terry Funk teamed together in a tag team match against Lance Storm and Sean Waltman, with the match also being the last time Dreamer and Funk would team together at a House of Hardcore event. After the main event, Bully Ray made a surprise appearance attacking Funk and Dreamer and challenging Dreamer to a match at TNA PPV One Night Only: Old School. The show included special appearances by The Blue Meanie, The Sandman and Beulah McGillicutty. Appearing at the pre-show meet & greet was Ted DiBiase, Ted DiBiase Jr., Maryse Ouellet, Velvet Sky and J. J. Dillon. Commentary was provided by Vic Travagliante, Jordan Schneider, Danny Doring (Until the battle royal) and Matt Striker (After match 4). This show aired on Twitch on November 11, 2018.

No.	Results	Stipulations	Times
1	Sonjay Dutt defeated Ben "The Beast" Ortiz	Singles match	6:33
2	Matt Striker defeated Lance Anoaʻi	Singles match	3:32
3	Carlito Colón & Thea Trinidad defeated Stevie Richards & Lisa Marie Varon	Mixed tag team match	13:09
4	Vik Dalishus (w/ Monique Dupree & Larry Dallas) defeated Anthony Michaels, Bill Carr, Brooke Danielle, CJ Mirror, D3, Danny Doring, Fungus, Hale Collins, Harley Cruise, Joe Caldo, John Redbeard, King Danza (w/ DG Haven), Guido Maritato, Mike Mitchell, Nick Owens, Roberto Castillo, Shooter Schultz, Spike Dudley, T. Sizzle, The Silent Assassin and Tony DeVito	Hardcore Battle Royal	24:10
5	MVP defeated Big XLG (w/ Amber O'Neal)	Singles match	12:06
6	Devon and Matt Hardy (w/ Reby Sky) defeated Outlaw Inc. (Eddie Kingston & Homicide) (w/ Amber O'Neal)	Tag team match	14:25
7	Rhino defeated Kevin Steen	Singles match	13:51
8	Tony Nese defeated Alex Reynolds and Petey Williams	Three Way Dance	15:32
9	Tommy Dreamer and Terry Funk defeated Lance Storm and Sean Waltman (w/ Angelina Love and Justin Credible)	Tag team match	14:51

=== House of Hardcore IV ===
House of Hardcore IV
- Promotion: House of Hardcore
- Date: June 6, 2014
- City: Poughkeepsie, New York
- Venue: Mid-Hudson Civic Center
- Attendance: 850

Event chronology
← Previous; House of Hardcore III	Next → House of Hardcore V

House of Hardcore IV was a professional wrestling event that took place in Poughkeepsie, New York on June 6, 2014. The original main event was Team 3D vs Tommy Dreamer & Abyss, but Bully Ray was pulled last minute by TNA. After a scathing promo, Abyss joined by Rhino turned on Dreamer setting up the new main event. The promo led to Dreamer/HOH being featured on Impact Wrestling through the summer. The show included special appearances by The Sandman and Spike Dudley. Appearing on the pre-show meet & greet was The Godfather, Tammy "Sunny" Sytch and Mindi O'Brien. Commentary was provided by Vic Travagliante, Jordan Schneider, Danny Doring (Until match 7) and Matt Striker (After match 7). This show also featured a surprise punishment of Brian "Q" Quinn for the show Impractical Jokers.

No.	Results	Stipulations	Times
1	Guido Maritato defeated Matt Striker	Singles match	8:27
2	Lance Anoaʻi defeated Ben "The Beast" Ortiz	Singles match	10:11
3	Joe Caldo, Gangrel and Hurricane Helms defeated Vik Dalishus (w/ Monique & Monet Dupree), Bill Carr and Cerebus	Six man tag team match	9:49
4	Hale Collins defeated CW Anderson (w/ DG Haven)	Singles match	9:31
5	Jesse Siegel won the HOH student Battle Royal	Battle Royal	—
6	Bad Influence (Christopher Daniels & Frankie Kazarian) defeated Outlaw Inc. (Eddie Kingston & Homicide)	Tag team match	15:23
7	Kevin Steen defeated Adam Pearce	Singles match	14:01
8	Petey Williams defeated Tony Nese and Alex Reynolds	Three Way Dance	12:29
9	A.J. Styles defeated Chris Hero	Singles match	17:20
10	Tommy Dreamer and Devon defeated Abyss and Rhino	Tag team match	16:13

=== House of Hardcore V ===
House of Hardcore V
- Promotion: House of Hardcore
- Date: June 7, 2014
- City: Philadelphia, Pennsylvania
- Venue: National Guard Armory
- Attendance: 820

Event chronology
← Previous; House of Hardcore IV	Next → House of Hardcore VI

House of Hardcore V was a professional wrestling event that took place at National Guard Armory in Philadelphia, Pennsylvania. This House of Hardcore event featured AJ Styles taking on Kevin Steen in the main event and Bad Influence (Christopher Daniels and Frankie Kazarian) taking on Tony Nese and Petey Williams in the co-main event. The event also showed founder Tommy Dreamer fighting "The Monster" Abyss in a Monster's Ball match due to the events from the previous show. The Sandman also made a special appearance on the show with Beulah McGillicutty appearing on the pre-show meet and greet. Commentary was provided by Vic Travagliante, Jordan Schneider and Matt Striker.

No.	Results	Stipulations	Times
1	Guido Maritato defeated Danny Doring	Singles match	4:19
2	Gangrel, Cerebus and Fungus defeated Vik Dalishus (with The Double Duprees) (Monique & Monet Dupree)) and Team Tremendous (Detective Dan Barry & Detective Bill Carr)	Six man tag team match	6:21
3	Drew Gulak (w/ Mindi O'Brien and Krista Easto) defeated Ben "The Beast" Ortiz (w/ DG Haven) and Lance Anoaʻi	Three way dance	11:10
4	Chris Hero defeated Adam Pearce	Singles match	12:36
5	CW Anderson and Devon defeated Outlaw Inc. (Eddie Kingston & Homicide)	Tag team match	12:14
6	Abyss defeated Tommy Dreamer	Monster's Ball match	13:00
7	Bad Influence (Christopher Daniels & Frankie Kazarian) defeated Tony Nese and Petey Williams	Tag team match	17:15
8	A.J. Styles defeated Kevin Steen	Singles match	17:13

=== House of Hardcore VI ===
House of Hardcore VI
- Promotion: House of Hardcore
- Date: June 14, 2014
- City: Valley Center, California
- Venue: Harrah's Resort Southern California
- Attendance: 750

Event chronology
← Previous; House of Hardcore V	Next → House of Hardcore VII

House of Hardcore VI (also known as House of Hardcore VI: The West Coast Invasion) was a professional wrestling event featuring of an attendance of 750 people. The event saw the founder of House of Hardcore Tommy Dreamer taking on Matt Hardy and Carlito in a Tables, Ladders, and Chairs Match. The Young Bucks (Matt and Nick Jackson) took on The Addiction (Christopher Daniels and Frankie Kazarian) in the main event. The show also included special appearances by The Nasty Boys (Brian Knobbs & Jerry Sags) and The Sandman. Before the show American Icon Autographs held a convention that featured Ric Flair, Bill Goldberg, Dennis Rodman, Roddy Piper, Lita, Zeus and others. After the show, Piper held a live edition of Piper's Pit podcast. Commentary was provided by Vic Travagliante and (Joining during match 8) Matt Striker. This show was broadcast on Twitch on December 23, 2018.

No.	Results	Stipulations	Times
1	Joey Ryan defeated Tommaso Ciampa	Singles match	8:01
2	Chris Mordetzky defeated Bushwhacker Luke	Masterlock Challenge	0:19
3	Chris Mordetzky defeated Balls Mahoney	Masterlock Challenge	0:34
4	Chris Mordetzky defeated Ezekiel Jackson	Masterlock Challenge	0:51
5	King Mo defeated Chris Mordetzky	Masterlock Challenge	2:05
6	Rikishi and Sean Waltman defeated Gangrel and Matt Striker	Tag team match	10:07
7	Bob Holly defeated Adam Pearce (w/ Jarek 1:20)	Singles match	9:24
8	Michael Bennett (w/ Maria Kanellis) defeated Lance Storm	Singles match	12:27
9	Mil Mascaras defeated Aaron Aguilera	Singles match	8:24
10	Matt Hardy (w/ Reby Sky) defeated Carlito Colón (w/ DG Haven, Big Duke and Julie Dawson) and Tommy Dreamer (w/ Terry Funk and Candice Michelle)	Tables, Ladders, and Chairs match	24:56
11	The Young Bucks (Matt & Nick Jackson) defeated The Addiction (Christopher Daniels & Frankie Kazarian)	Tag team match	26:07

=== House of Hardcore VII ===
House of Hardcore VII
- Promotion: House of Hardcore
- Date: November 15, 2014
- City: Philadelphia, Pennsylvania
- Venue: 2300 Arena
- Attendance: 1,400

Event chronology
← Previous; House of Hardcore VI	Next → House of Hardcore 8

House of Hardcore VII was a professional wrestling internet pay-per-view (iPPV) event produced by House of Hardcore. It took place on November 15, 2014, at the 2300 Arena (formerly known as the ECW Arena) in Philadelphia, Pennsylvania. Tommy Dreamer's original opponent was Ethan Carter III (due to their TNA feud) but he missed the show due to injury; instead the fans got a surprise TNA World Title match. The show included special appearances by Ricardo Rodriguez, Alberto El Patron, CW Anderson, The Sandman, Velvet Sky, Spike Dudley and Thea Trinidad. House of Hardcore VII was also the last appearance for Tommy Dreamer's wife Beulah McGillicutty as a valet. Commentary was provided by Vic Travagliante and Matt Striker. This show aired on Twitch on January 20, 2019.

No.	Results	Stipulations	Times
1	Stevie Richards defeated "Dastardly" Danny Doring	Singles match	06:41
2	Christian York defeated Brian Myers	Singles match	08:54
3	Team Tremendous (Detective Dan Barry & Detective Bill Carr) and Guido Maritato defeated Vik Dalishus (w/ The Double Duprees), Anthony Greene and Ben "The Beast" Ortiz	Six man tag team match	11:58
4	Eddie Edwards defeated Eddie Kingston	Singles match	13:54
5	Tony Nese defeated Lance Anoaʻi and Alex Reynolds (w/ DG Haven & Mindi O'Brien)	Three way elimination match	12:24
6	Team 3D (Bully Ray & Devon) defeated Killer Elite Squad (Davey Boy Smith Jr. & Lance Archer)	Tag team match	8:25
7	Austin Aries defeated Drew Galloway	Singles match-Open Challenge by Drew Galloway	18:56
8	Bobby Roode (c) defeated Tommy Dreamer (w/ Beulah McGillicutty)	Extreme rules match for the TNA World Heavyweight Championship	14:39
9	The Young Bucks (Matt & Nick Jackson) defeated The Hardys (Jeff Hardy & Matt Hardy)	Tag team match	23:31
(c) / – the champion(s) heading into the match

=== House of Hardcore 8 ===
House of Hardcore 8
- Promotion: House of Hardcore
- Date: March 7, 2015
- City: Philadelphia, Pennsylvania
- Venue: 2300 Arena
- Attendance: 1,400

Event chronology
← Previous; House of Hardcore VII	Next → House of Hardcore 9

House of Hardcore 8 was a professional wrestling internet pay-per-view (iPPV) event produced by House of Hardcore. It took place on March 7, 2015, at the 2300 Arena in Philadelphia, Pennsylvania. Before the event, several names in professional wrestling signed autographs for the fans. This included Barbie Blank, Melina, Mike Rotunda, Lanny Poffo, Ashley Massaro, Magnum T. A., Earl Hebner and several more. Building up to the event, Tommy Dreamer and Eric Young would feud on Impact leading up to the House of Hardcore VIII internet pay-per-view. This event featured a tribute to Mikey Whipwreck from his students and the fans. The show featured appearances by Justin Roberts, Thea Trinidad, Velvet Sky, Ethan Carter III and Rey Mysterio. Commentary was provided by Vic Travagliante and Daniel Morrison. This show was broadcast on Twitch on March 31, 2019.

No.	Results	Stipulations	Times
1	PJ Black defeated Brian Myers	Singles match	3:54
2	Amazing Red defeated Matt Striker	Singles match	8:04
3	Alex Reynolds (w/ DG Haven) defeated J. T. Dunn	Singles match	09:28
4	Rhino defeated Eddie Kingston	Singles match	11:16
5	Team Tremendous (Detective Dan Barry & Detective Bill Carr) and Tony Nese defeated Ben "The Beast" Ortiz (w/ Jonny Ferrari), Hale Collins (w/ Patricia Bateman) and Vik Dalishus (w/ The Duprees)	Six man tag team match with Mikey Whipwreck as the special guest referee	15:01
6	Matt Hardy defeated Lance Hoyt and Carlito Colón	Three Way Dance	24:02
7	Team 3D (Bully Ray & Devon) defeated The Addiction (Christopher Daniels & Frankie Kazarian)	Tag team match	16:33
8	Eric Young defeated Tommy Dreamer	South Philly street fight	18:27
9	The Young Bucks (Matt & Nick Jackson) defeated Dirty Heels (Bobby Roode & Austin Aries)	Tag team match	22:37

=== House of Hardcore 9 ===
House of Hardcore 9
- Promotion: House of Hardcore
- Date: July 18, 2015
- City: Toronto, Ontario
- Venue: Ted Reeve Arena
- Attendance: 1,700

Event chronology
← Previous; House of Hardcore 8	Next → House of Hardcore 10

House of Hardcore 9 was a professional wrestling event produced by House of Hardcore, which was taped for The Fight Network. It took place on July 18, 2015, at the Ted Reeve Arena in Toronto. It was the ninth event in the House of Hardcore promotion and included special appearances by Jessicka Havok and Spencer Rice. House of Hardcore 9 also marked the final wrestling appearance of Traci Brooks. Commentary was provided by Vic Travagliante and Daniel Morrison. This show was broadcast on Twitch on September 23, 2018

No.	Results	Stipulations	Times
1	Chris Hero defeated Tommy Dreamer	Singles match	09:38
2	Bobby Roode defeated Pepper Parks (w/ Cherry Bomb)	Singles match	08:19
3	Team Tremendous (Detective Dan Barry & Detective Bill Carr), Hacker Scotty and Matt Striker (w/ Mindi O'Brien) defeated Ethan Page, RJ City, Vik Dalishus (w/ The Duprees) and Ben "The Beast" Ortiz (w/ Katred)	Eight-man tag team match with Jim Korderas as the special guest referee	14:49
4	John Hennigan defeated Tony Nese	Singles match	15:00
5	The Addiction (Christopher Daniels & Frankie Kazarian) (w/ Traci Brooks) defeated The Kingdom (Matt Taven & Michael Bennett) (w/ Maria Kanellis)	Tag team match	14:12
6	Tommaso Ciampa defeated Eddie Kingston	Singles match	08:02
7	Austin Aries (w/ Thea Trinidad) defeated Rhino	Singles match-Open Challenge by Rhino	12:26
8	Team 3D (Bully Ray & Devon) defeated The Young Bucks (Matt Jackson & Nick Jackson)	Toronto Street Fight tag team match	09:05

=== House of Hardcore 10 ===
House of Hardcore 10
- Promotion: House of Hardcore
- Date: November 13, 2015
- City: Philadelphia, Pennsylvania
- Venue: 2300 Arena

Event chronology
← Previous; House of Hardcore 9	Next → House of Hardcore 11

House of Hardcore 10 was a professional wrestling internet pay-per-view (iPPV) event produced by House of Hardcore, which took place on November 13, 2015, at the 2300 Arena in Philadelphia, Pennsylvania. House of Hardcore 10 also included appearances by Pepper Parks, Cherry Bomb, Chris Mordetzky, Sabu, Melissa Coates and The Sandman. The event also marked the induction of Dean Malenko and Eddie Guerrero into the 2300 Arena Hardcore Hall of Fame. Commentary was provided by Vic Travagliante and Daniel Morrison.

No.	Results	Stipulations
1	Yusuke Kodama defeated Ben "The Beast" Ortiz	Singles match
2	Chris Hero defeated Lance Hoyt	Singles match
3	Tony Nese defeated Alex Reynolds and J. T. Dunn	Three way elimination match
4	Team Tremendous (Detective Dan Barry & Detective Bill Carr), Officer Colt Cabana and The FBI (Guido Maritato & Tony Mamaluke) defeated Vik Dalishus (w/ The Double Duprees), Jade and Samoan Empire (Afa Jr., Lance Anoaʻi and LA Smooth)	Ten-man tag team match with Earl Hebner as the special guest referee
5	Eddie Kingston defeated Tommaso Ciampa	Singles match
6	Rhino defeated Abyss	No disqualification match
7	Austin Aries (w/ Thea Trinidad) defeated Bobby Roode	Singles match
8	Tommy Dreamer and Yoshihiro Tajiri defeated Ethan Carter III and Eric Young	Tag team match

=== House of Hardcore 11 ===
House of Hardcore 11
- Promotion: House of Hardcore
- Date: November 14, 2015
- City: Corona, Queens, New York
- Venue: Elmcor Center

Event chronology
← Previous; House of Hardcore 10	Next → House of Hardcore 12

House of Hardcore 11 was a professional wrestling event produced by House of Hardcore, which took place on November 14, 2015, at the Elmcor Center in Corona, Queens, New York. The event hosted the final match of the Dirty Heels tag team, as Austin Aries would debut for WWE's NXT brand in January 2016. The event featured appearances by Pepper Parks and Cherry Bomb. Commentary was provided by Vic Travagliante and Daniel Morrison.

No.	Results	Stipulations
1	Brian Myers defeated Lance Hoyt	Singles match
2	Thea Trinidad defeated Jade	Singles match with Velvet Sky as special guest referee
3	Eric Young defeated Tony Nese	Singles match
4	Team Tremendous (Detective Dan Barry & Detective Bill Carr), Yusuke Kodama and Officer Colt Cabana defeated Ben "The Beast" Ortiz (w/ DG Haven), Hale Collins, Eddie Kingston and Vik Dalishus (w/ The Double Duprees)	Eight-man tag team match with The Sandman as special guest referee
5	Tommaso Ciampa defeated Alex Reynolds and J. T. Dunn	Three way elimination match
6	Sabu (w/ Melissa Coates) defeated Abyss	Monster's Ball match
7	Yoshihiro Tajiri defeated Chris Hero	Singles match
8	Ethan Carter III (w/ Katred and Ashley Tramonte) defeated Tommy Dreamer	New York Street Fight
9	The Wolves (c) (Davey Richards & Eddie Edwards) defeated Dirty Heels (Austin Aries & Bobby Roode)	Tag team match for TNA World Tag Team Championship
(c) / – the champion(s) heading into the match

=== House of Hardcore 12 ===
House of Hardcore 12
- Promotion: House of Hardcore
- Date: April 15, 2016
- City: Corona, Queens, New York
- Venue: Elmcor Center
- Attendance: 850

chronology
← Previous; House of Hardcore 11	Next → House of Hardcore 13

House of Hardcore 12 was a professional wrestling event which took place on April 15, 2016, at the Elmcor Center in Corona, Queens, New York. The show included the HOH debuts of Billy Gunn and Brian Cage, as well as the HOH return of Sami Callihan. The show also included appearances by The Blue Meanie, Shane Douglas, Danny Doring and Joel Gertner, who joined with Tommy Dreamer, Rob Van Dam and Rhino in the ring to pay tribute to the recently deceased ECW alumnus Balls Mahoney. This event was a rare time when the Pro Wrestling NOAH GHC Tag Team Titles were defended outside Japan. Commentary was provided by Vic Travagliante and Daniel Morrison.

No.	Results	Stipulations
1	Thea Trinidad defeated Deonna Purrazzo	Singles match
2	Little Guido defeated Alex Reynolds (w/ DG Haven)	Singles match
3	"The Golden Boy" D3 and Team Tremendous (Detective Dan Barry & Detective Bill Carr) defeated Vik Dalishus (w/ The Double Duprees), Hale Collins and Ben "The Beast" Ortiz	Six-man tag team match
4	Pepper Parks (w/ Cherry Bomb and TJ Marconi) defeated Colt Cabana	Singles match
5	Tony Nese defeated Brian Cage and Brian Myers	Triple threat match
6	Billy Gunn defeated Sami Callihan	Teacher vs. Student match
7	Bull James defeated Eddie Kingston	Singles match
8	Killer Elite Squad (Davey Boy Smith Jr. & Lance Archer) (c) defeated Rhino and Tommy Dreamer	Tag team match for GHC Tag Team Championship
9	Rob Van Dam defeated Chris Hero	Singles match
(c) / – the champion(s) heading into the match

=== House of Hardcore 13 ===
House of Hardcore 13
- Promotion: House of Hardcore
- Date: April 16, 2016
- City: Philadelphia, Pennsylvania
- Venue: 2300 Arena
- Attendance: 1,400

chronology
← Previous; House of Hardcore 12	Next → House of Hardcore 14

House of Hardcore 13 was a professional wrestling event which took place on April 16, 2016, at the 2300 Arena in Philadelphia, Pennsylvania. Like the previous show, HOH 13 included a tribute to recently deceased wrestler Balls Mahoney. This event featured a rare defense of Pro Wrestling NOAH's GHC Tag Team Titles outside Japan. The event also included appearances by SoCal Val, Ricky Steamboat, Vik Dalishus, The Double Duprees, Kevin Thorn, Sean Waltman and The Sandman. Before the show, Icons of Wrestling held a convention which featured Shawn Michaels, Kurt Angle, Sean Waltman, Bobby Heenan and others. Commentary was provided by Vic Travagliante and Daniel Morrison.

No.	Results	Stipulations
1	Jade defeated Thea Trinidad	Singles match
2	Team Tremendous (Detective Dan Barry & Detective Bill Carr) defeated Ben "Action" Ortiz and Eddie Kingston	Tag team match
3	Billy Gunn defeated Bull James	Teacher vs Student match
4	Tony Nese defeated Alex Reynolds (w/ DG Haven) and Chris Dickinson	Triple threat match
5	Pepper Parks (w/ Cherry Bomb and TJ Marconi) defeated Tommy Dreamer (w/ Mickie James)	Singles match
6	Brian Cage defeated Sami Callihan	Singles match
7	Killer Elite Squad (Davey Boy Smith Jr. & Lance Archer) defeated Colt Cabana and Chris Hero	Tag team match for Pro Wrestling Noah GHC Tag Team Championship
8	Rob Van Dam defeated Rhino	Singles match

=== House of Hardcore 14 ===
House of Hardcore 14
- Promotion: House of Hardcore
- Date: May 7, 2016
- City: Niagara Falls, Ontario, Canada
- Venue: Scotiabank Convention Centre

Event chronology
← Previous; House of Hardcore 13	Next → House of Hardcore 15

House of Hardcore 14 was a professional wrestling event produced by House of Hardcore, which took place on May 7, 2016, at the Scotiabank Convention Centre in Niagara Falls, Ontario, Canada. This event was a part of the MindiO Fitness Extravaganza, which took place earlier in the day. The main event featured an all-Ontario match-up with Bobby Roode vs. Eric Young, which was both men's last show before joining WWE's NXT brand. Commentary was provided by Vic Travagliante and Daniel Morrison.

No.	Results	Stipulations
1	Bull James defeated Eddie Kingston	Singles match
2	CJ Mirror, Psycho Mike and Hacker Scotty (w/ Katred) defeated Maybach Beta, Adam Brooks and Ben "Action" Ortiz (w/ The Double Duprees)	Six-man tag team match
3	Colt Cabana defeated Chris Hero	Singles match
4	Magnus defeated Cody Deaner	Singles match
5	Rhino defeated Moose	Singles match
6	Tony Nese defeated RJ City and Alex Reynolds	Triple threat elimination match
7	Tommy Dreamer and Mickie James (w/ Mindi O'Brien) defeated Pepper Parks & Cherry Bomb (w/ TJ Marconi)	Extreme Rules mixed tag team match
8	Bobby Roode defeated Eric Young	Singles match with Jimmy Korderas as the special guest referee

=== House of Hardcore 15 ===
House of Hardcore 15
- Promotion: House of Hardcore
- Date: June 24, 2016
- City: Burwood East, Victoria, Australia
- Venue: Whitehorse Club

Event chronology
← Previous; House of Hardcore 14	Next → House of Hardcore 16

House of Hardcore 15 (also known as House of Hardcore – Melbourne, while being promoted international as House of Hardcore – Australian Invasion and domestically as Outback Championship Wrestling presents House of Hardcore) was a professional wrestling event produced by House of Hardcore and Australian Promotion Outback Championship Wrestling, which took place on Friday June 24, 2016 at the Whitehorse Club in East Burwood, Melbourne, Australia. It was announced on Tuesday June 7, 2016 that all seated tickets were sold out and only standing room tickets remained. The event included appearances by Lisa Marie Varon, Carlito, Mickie James, Mark Cometti and Bull James. However, due to travel issues, both MVP & Magnus were unable to enter Australia. Commentary was provided by Vic Travagliante and Daniel Morrison.

No.	Results	Stipulations
1	Hurricane Helms defeated Mohamad Ali Vaez	Singles match
2	Syd Parker defeated Adam Brooks	Singles match
3	Mr. Juicy, Hard Way Inc. (Mike Burr & Josh Shooter), JXT and Dowie James (w/ Vixsin) defeated Sketch, Slade Mercer, Gabriel Wolfe, Cadman Turner & Big Cuz (w/ Freddie Gold)	Ten-man tag team match
4	Mark Silva defeated Bull James	Singles match
5	Cletus defeated Mad Dog McCrea (c)	Hardcore match for the OCW Heavyweight Championship
6	Mickie James defeated Lisa Marie Varon	Singles match
7	Carlito (w/ Willow) defeated Andy Phoenix, KrackerJak and Tommy Dreamer	Number 1 contenders Fatal 4-Way match for the OCW Heavyweight Championship
(c) / – the champion(s) heading into the match

=== House of Hardcore 16 ===
House of Hardcore 16
- Promotion: House of Hardcore
- Date: August 6, 2016
- City: Pasadena, Texas
- Venue: Pasadena Convention Center

Event chronology
← Previous; House of Hardcore 15	Next → House of Hardcore 17

House of Hardcore 16 was a joint professional wrestling event produced by House of Hardcore and Reality of Wrestling, which took place on August 6, 2016, at the Pasadena Convention Center in Pasadena, Texas. Proceeds for House of Hardcore 16 went to support the Bustin' for Autism charity. Before the event Icons of Wrestling held a convention with appearances by Vickie Guerrero, Booker T, Brother Love, One Man Gang, Gene Snitsky and others. Commentary was provided by Vic Travagliante and Daniel Morrison.

No.	Results	Stipulations
1	Underground Luchador defeated P-Dawg (w/ The Double Duprees)	Singles match
2	Kylie Rae (c) defeated Katred	Singles match for the ROW Diamonds Championship
3	Luke Hawx defeated Bu Ku Dao	Singles match
4	Carlito defeated JJ Blake	Singles match
5	Billy Gunn defeated Lance Hoyt	"Battle of the Big Men" singles match
6	Rex Andrews (c) defeated Evan Snow and Tony Nese by submission	Three-Way Dance for the ROW TV Championship
7	MVP defeated Moose	Singles match-Open Challenge by Moose
8	Mickie James and Tommy Dreamer (w/ The Sandman) defeated Cherry Bomb & Pepper Parks (w/ JJ Spade)	Mixed tag team Texas Death match
(c) / – the champion(s) heading into the match

=== House of Hardcore 17 ===
House of Hardcore 17
- Promotion: House of Hardcore
- Date: September 16, 2016
- City: St. James, New York
- Venue: The Sports Arena

Event chronology
← Previous; House of Hardcore 16	Next → House of Hardcore 18

House of Hardcore 17 was a professional wrestling event produced by House of Hardcore, which took place on September 16, 2016, at The Sports Arena in St. James, New York. This event featured an appearance by The Sandman. Terry Funk made a special appearance at the pre-show meet & greet Commentary was provided by Vic Travagliante.

No.	Results	Stipulations
1	Matt Striker defeated Alex Reynolds	Singles match
2	Team Tremendous (Detective Bill Carr & Detective Dan Barry) and Connor Braxton defeated Vik Dalishus (w/ The Double Duprees), TJ Marconi and CJ Mirror (w/ DG Haven)	Six-Man Tag Team match
3	Mascarita Dorada defeated Swoggle	Singles match
4	Brian Myers defeated Pat Buck	Singles match
5	Bull James defeated Eddie Kingston	Singles match
6	"Broken" Matt Hardy (w/ Rebecca Hardy & Señor Benjamin) defeated Aron Rex	Singles match
7	Ricochet defeated Tony Nese	Singles match
8	Rhino (w/ Pete Gas) defeated Tommy Dreamer	Extreme New York Street Fight

=== House of Hardcore 18 ===
House of Hardcore 18
- Promotion: House of Hardcore
- Date: September 17, 2016
- City: Philadelphia, Pennsylvania
- Venue: 2300 Arena

Event chronology
← Previous; House of Hardcore 17	Next → House of Hardcore 19

House of Hardcore 18 was a professional wrestling event produced by House of Hardcore, which took place on September 17, 2016, at 2300 Arena in Philadelphia, Pennsylvania. The Dreamer/Hardy main event had been built up on Twitter after Dreamer showed support for Jeff Hardy in his TNA feud with his brother Matt. After the main event, Bully Ray made the Dreamer/Hardy rematch in a Steel Cage for HOH 22. The event also included appearance by Santino Marella, Terry Funk, Ryback, Joey Styles, Beulah McGillicutty, Raven, The Sandman, and Bully Ray. Before the show Icons of Wrestling held a convention with Sting, Bret Hart, The Steiner Brothers, Ted Dibiase and others appearing. Commentary was provided by Vic Travagliante and Daniel Morrison.

No.	Results	Stipulations
1	Robbie E defeated Lance Anoaʻi	Singles match
2	Alex Reynolds defeated Pat Buck and John Silver	Three-Way Dance
3	Vik Dalishus (w/ The Double Duprees & DG Haven), TJ Marconi and Eddie Kingston defeated Team Tremendous (Detective Dan Barry & Detective Bill Carr) and Connor Braxton (Bill Carr suspended for 6 months)	Six-man tag team match-Loser Suspended For 6 Months
4	Chris Hero defeated Tony Nese	Singles match
5	Brian Myers and Swoggle defeated "The Underground Luchador" and Mascarita Dorada	Tag team match
6	Ricochet defeated Sami Callihan	Singles match
7	"Broken" Matt Hardy (w/ Rebecca Hardy, Señor Benjamin & The Scribe) defeated Tommy Dreamer	No Disqualification match

=== House of Hardcore 19 ===
House of Hardcore 19
- Promotion: House of Hardcore
- Date: October 14, 2016
- City: Cleveland, Ohio
- Venue: The Odeon

Event chronology
← Previous; House of Hardcore 18	Next → House of Hardcore 20

House of Hardcore 19 was a professional wrestling event produced by House of Hardcore, which took place on October 14, 2016, at The Odeon in Cleveland, Ohio. Even though Bill Carr was suspended, he competed at the show due to being previously advertised. The event also included appearances by The Sandman and Bully Ray. Commentary was provided by Vic Travagliante. The event was also the first time a currently contracted TNA wrestler faced a currently contracted WWE wrestler faced a HOH contracted wrestler with Ethan Carter III going against Rhino and Tommy Dreamer in a "No Politics, No BS, Just Wrestling" match.

No.	Results	Stipulations
1	"The Underground Luchador" defeated Alex Reynolds (w/ Benjamin Boone)	Singles match
2	Facade (w/ Dani) defeated John Silver	Singles match
3	Kevin Thorn defeated Bull James	Singles match
4	Candice LaRae defeated Jessicka Havok	Singles match with Marti Bell as the special guest referee
5	Team Tremendous (Detective Dan Barry & Detective Bill Carr) and Swoggle defeated The NOW (Vic Dalishus & Hale Collins) (w/ The Double Duprees) and Matt Justice	Six-man tag team match
6	Bob Holly defeated Sami Callihan (w/ JT Davidson)	Singles match
7	Matt Cross defeated Tony Nese	Singles match
8	Ethan Carter III defeated Rhino and Tommy Dreamer	No Politics, No BS, Just Wrestling match

=== House of Hardcore 20 ===
House of Hardcore 20
- Promotion: House of Hardcore
- Date: October 15, 2016
- City: Elizabeth, Pennsylvania
- Venue: Court Time Sports Center

Event chronology
← Previous; House of Hardcore 19	Next → House of Hardcore 21: Blizzard Brawl

House of Hardcore 20 was a professional wrestling event co-produced by House of Hardcore and International Wrestling Cartel, which took place on October 15, 2016, at Court Time Sports Center in Elizabeth, Pennsylvania. The event featured appearances by The Sandman and Bully Ray. This show was Rhino's last HOH show before going full-time with WWE. Commentary was provided by Vic Travagliante.

No.	Results	Stipulations
1	Bull James defeated Kevin Thorn (w/ The Double Duprees)	Singles match
2	Chris LeRusso defeated Facade (w/Dani)	Singles match for vacant IWC Super Indy Championship
3	Alex Reynolds defeated Dan Barry and John Silver	Triple Threat Match
4	Bob Holly defeated Ethan Carter III	Singles match
5	Team LaBar (Dylan Bostic, RJ City & Wardlow) (w/ Justin LaBar & Ray Lyn) defeated Team IWC (Andrew Palace, Jimmy Vegas and Matt Striker) (w/ John McChesney & Justin Plummer)	Six-man tag team match
6	Tony Nese defeated Matt Cross	Singles match
7	Candice LaRae, Swoggle and Tommy Dreamer defeated Allie, Braxton Sutter and Jessicka Havok	Six person tag team match
8	Rhino defeated Sami Callihan (w/ JT Davidson)	Singles match

=== House of Hardcore 21: Blizzard Brawl ===
House of Hardcore 21: Blizzard Brawl
- Promotion: House of Hardcore
- Date: December 3, 2016
- City: Waukesha, Wisconsin
- Venue: Waukesha County Expo

Event chronology
← Previous; House of Hardcore 20	Next → House of Hardcore 22

House of Hardcore 21: Blizzard Brawl was a professional wrestling event produced by House of Hardcore, which took place on December 3, 2016, at Waukesha County Expo in Waukesha, Wisconsin. This was the first HOH show broadcast on FloSlam. The event also included appearances by Ryback, Swoggle, Benjamin Boone and The Sandman. Commentary was provided by Vic Travagliante. The main event was non-sanctioned by House of Hardcore. It was the final match for the former promotion that promoted Blizzard Brawl (Great Lakes Championship Wrestling) and the cage match settled the feud that ended GLCW (The match is a FloSlam exclusive).

No.	Results	Stipulations
1	Bull James defeated Kevin Thorn	Singles match
2	Matt Striker (w/ The Double Duprees) defeated Connor Braxton (w/ Katie Forbes and Mike Sweeney)	Singles match
3	Mr. Anderson defeated Sadist	Singles match
4	Colt Cabana defeated "Hot Shot" Danny Duggan	Singles match
5	Matt Cross defeated Tony Nese	Singles match
6	Tommy Dreamer and Mickie James defeated Aiden O’Shea and Angelina Love (w/ Mustafa)	Intergender tag team match
7	Sami Callihan (w/ JT Davidson) defeated Bob Holly	Singles match
8^{D}	Al Snow and Dave Herro defeated Abyss and Damien Nelson	Steel cage tag team match
D / – this was a dark match

=== House of Hardcore 22 ===
House of Hardcore 22
- Promotion: House of Hardcore
- Date: December 16, 2016
- City: Philadelphia, Pennsylvania
- Venue: 2300 Arena

Event chronology
← Previous; House of Hardcore 21: Blizzard Brawl	Next → House of Hardcore 23

House of Hardcore 22 was a professional wrestling event produced by House of Hardcore and broadcast on FloSlam, which took place on December 16, 2016, at 2300 Arena in Philadelphia, Pennsylvania. The card included the final independent match for Tony Nese, who had recently signed with WWE. This show featured the first HOH sanctioned Steel cage match. The event also included appearances by Matt Striker, Bull James, Katred, Bill Carr, The Sandman and Brother Nero. Commentary was provided by Vic Travagliante and Daniel Morrison.

No.	Results	Stipulations
1	"Broad Street Brawler" Steve Lombardi defeated Alex Reynolds	Singles match
2	Taya defeated Jessicka Havok	Singles match
3	Tony Nese defeated Lio Rush (w/ Ken Dixon)	Singles match
4	Dan Barry, Connor Braxton and Kikutaro defeated Vik Dalishus (w/ The Double Duprees), Eddie Kingston (w/ DG Haven) and TJ Marconi	Six-man tag team match-Dan Barry's HOH Career on the Line
5	Moose defeated Colt Cabana	Singles match
6	Sami Callihan (w/ JT Davidson) defeated Brian Cage	Singles match
7	John Hennigan defeated Fénix	Singles match
8	"Broken" Matt Hardy defeated Tommy Dreamer	Steel cage match

=== House of Hardcore 23 ===
House of Hardcore 23
- Promotion: House of Hardcore
- Date: December 17, 2016
- City: Joppa, Maryland
- Venue: MCW Arena

Event chronology
← Previous; House of Hardcore 22	Next → House of Hardcore 24

House of Hardcore 23 was a professional wrestling event produced by House of Hardcore and broadcast on FloSlam, which took place on December 17, 2016, at the MCW Arena in Joppa, Maryland. The event also included appearances by Nikolai Volkoff, "Baltimore Brawler" Steve Lombardi, and The Sandman. This event was supposed to feature James Ellsworth teaming with Tommy Dreamer, but his WWE commitment forced Dreamer to find a new partner. This show took place during a harsh ice storm. Commentary was provided by Vic Travagliante and Daniel Morrison in what was Travagliante's last show before signing with WWE.

No.	Results	Stipulations
1	Jessicka Havok defeated Taya	Singles match
2	Eddie Kingston defeated Lance Anoaʻi	Singles match
3	Matt Striker, Conor Braxton and Kikutaro defeated Vik Dalishus (w/ The Double Duprees & DG Haven), Benjamin Boone and Hale Collins	Six-man tag team match
4	Moose defeated Brian Cage	Singles match
5	Alex Reynolds defeated Dan Barry, Sonjay Dutt and Brandon Scott	Fatal four-way elimination match
6	Tommy Dreamer and The Sandman defeated The Squad (Kenny & Mikey)	Tag team match
7	Fénix defeated John Hennigan	Singles match

=== House of Hardcore 24 ===
House of Hardcore 24
- Promotion: House of Hardcore
- Date: April 21, 2017
- City: Metuchen, New Jersey
- Venue: Metuchen Sportsplex

Event chronology
← Previous; House of Hardcore 23	Next → House of Hardcore 25

House of Hardcore 24 was a professional wrestling event produced by House of Hardcore and broadcast on FloSlam, which took place on April 21, 2017, at the Metuchen Sportsplex in Metuchen, New Jersey. The event also included appearances by "Broken" Matt Hardy, Velvet Sky and The Sandman. The original main event was Hardy vs Tommy Dreamer, but Hardy's WWE contract forced him from the match. He was replaced by The Squad and Bully Ray was pulled from his match with Sami Callihan to team with Dreamer. Commentary was provided by Matt Camp and Daniel Morrison.

No.	Results	Stipulations
1	Bull James defeated TJ Marconi	Singles match
2	Rhett Titus defeated Ben "Action" Ortiz	Singles match
3	Devon Storm, Little Guido and Pat Buck defeated Gigolo Justin (w/ Desirable Dustin) and The NOW (Hale Collins and Vik Dalishus) (w/ The Double Duprees & Katred)	Six-man tag team match
4	Alex Reynolds (w/ Maxwell Jacob Friedman) defeated Matt Striker	Singles match
5	Brian Cage defeated MVP	Singles match
6	Sami Callihan (w/ JT Davidson) defeated Bobby Fish	Singles match
7	Bully Ray and Tommy Dreamer defeated The Squad (Kenny and Mikey) (w/ Randy)	Tag team match

=== House of Hardcore 25 ===
House of Hardcore 25
- Promotion: House of Hardcore
- Date: April 22, 2017
- City: Philadelphia, Pennsylvania
- Venue: 2300 Arena

Event chronology
← Previous; House of Hardcore 24	Next → House of Hardcore 26

House of Hardcore 25 was a professional wrestling event produced by House of Hardcore and broadcast on FloSlam, which took place on April 22, 2017, at the 2300 Arena in Philadelphia. Originally The Hardys were pulled from wrestling on this show due to signing with WWE, but last minute negotiations allowed them to participate in their advertised match. The event featured appearances by Ricky Steamboat, The Blue Meanie, Velvet Sky, The Sandman, Kenny and Mikey. Before the show Icons of Wrestling held a convention with Ric Flair, Kevin Nash, Scott Hall, Christian, Rey Mysterio and others attending. Commentary was provided by Matt Camp and Daniel Morrison.

No.	Results	Stipulations	Times
1	Matt Striker defeated Chuckles (w/ DG Haven)	Singles match	9:06
2	Alex Reynolds (w/ Maxwell Jacob Friedman & Maria Manic) defeated Little Guido	Singles match	7:25
3	The NOW (Hale Collins & Vik Dalishus) (with The Double Duprees & Katred) and TJ Marconi vs. John Score, Pat Buck & Tom North ended in a no contest	Six-man tag team match	3:35
4	Juventud Guerrera defeated C. W. Anderson	Singles match	7:56
5	Brian Cage defeated Ben "Action" Ortiz and Rhett Titus	Three Way Elimination match	13:22
6	MVP defeated Bull James	Singles match	8:55
7	The Hardys (Jeff & "Broken" Matt Hardy) defeated Bully Ray and Tommy Dreamer	Tag team match	9:09
8	Penta el Zero M defeated Sami Callihan (w/ JT Davidson)	Singles match	15:42

=== House of Hardcore 26 ===
House of Hardcore 26
- Promotion: House of Hardcore
- Date: May 19, 2017
- City: St. James, New York
- Venue: The Sports Arena

Event chronology
← Previous; House of Hardcore 25	Next → House of Hardcore 27

House of Hardcore 26 was a professional wrestling event produced by House of Hardcore and broadcast on FloSlam, which took place on May 19, 2017, at the Sports Arena in St. James, New York. The show featured Cody Rhodes facing Tommy Dreamer for the first time and Ethan Carter III answering Bully Ray's open challenge. The event also included appearances by Velvet Sky, Mick Foley and The Sandman. Commentary was provided by Matt Camp and Daniel Morrison.

No.	Results	Stipulations
1	Guido Maritato defeated Papadon	Singles match
2	Matt Striker defeated TJ Marconi (w/ DG Haven)	Singles match
3	Alex Reynolds (w/ Maria Manic & Maxwell Jacob Friedman) defeated Lance Anoaʻi	Singles match
4	Moose defeated Dan Maff	Singles match
5	Rhett Titus defeated Ben "Action" Ortiz and Bull James and Pat Buck	Four Way match
6	Bully Ray defeated Ethan Carter III (w/ The Double Duprees & CPA)	No Disqualification match
7	The Squad (Kenny and Mikey) (w/ Randy) defeated Team Tremendous (Bill Carr & Dan Barry) and The NOW (Hale Collins & Vik Dalishus) (w/ The Double Duprees)	Three Way Tag Team match
8	Cody Rhodes defeated Tommy Dreamer	Singles match

=== House of Hardcore 27 ===
House of Hardcore 27
- Promotion: House of Hardcore
- Date: June 16, 2017
- City: Bowen Hills, Brisbane, Queensland, Australia
- Venue: Brisbane Exhibition Ground

Event chronology
← Previous; House of Hardcore 26	Next → House of Hardcore 28

House of Hardcore 27 was a professional wrestling event produced by House of Hardcore and Aussie All Pro, which took place on June 16, 2017, at the Brisbane Exhibition Ground in Bowen Hills, Brisbane, Queensland, Australia. The event also included appearances by The Young Bucks, Jake Hager, Bull James, and MVP along with a number of Australian talent.

No.	Results	Stipulations
1	Colt Cabana defeated Hot Young Briley	Singles match
2	Carlito defeated Jack Bonza	Singles match
3	Headstrong (JL Gold & Xander Sullivan) and The Street Revolution (Lynx Lewis Jr. & Renegade) defeated Alex Shepard, Jesse Daniels, Thirteen & Tim Kade	Eight-man tag team match
4	MVP defeated Bull James	Singles match
5	Matt Cross defeated Andy Phoenix and Robbie Eagles	Triple Threat match
6	Billy Gunn defeated Jake Hager	Singles match
7	Mohamad Ali Vaez defeated Tommy Dreamer	Brisbane Street Fight
8	The Young Bucks (Matt Jackson & Nick Jackson) defeated The Squad (Kenny and Mikey)	Tag team match

=== House of Hardcore 28 ===
House of Hardcore 28
- Promotion: House of Hardcore
- Date: June 17, 2017
- City: Sydney, New South Wales, Australia
- Venue: Sydney Showground

Event chronology
← Previous; House of Hardcore 27	Next → House of Hardcore 29

House of Hardcore 28 was a professional wrestling event produced by House of Hardcore and Aussie All Pro, which took place on June 17, 2017, at the Sydney Showground in Sydney, New South Wales, Australia. Before the show, the HOH roster appeared at Supanova Comic Con. This event featured appearances by Young Bucks, Colt Cabana, Jake Hager, Matt Cross and others. Surprise appearances were made by Carlito and The Squad. This event had its broadcast debut on Twitch on February 18, 2018. Commentary was provided by Matt Camp and Daniel Morrison.

No.	Results	Stipulations
1	Colt Cabana defeated Hunter PS Hayes	Singles match
2	Madison Eagles defeated Shazza McKenzie	Singles match
3	Carlito defeated Hot Young Briley	Singles match
4	The Squad (Kenny and Mikey) defeated Bull James & Caveman Ugg	Tag team match
5	Robbie Eagles defeated Andy Phoenix and Jack Bonza	Triple threat match
6	Jake Hager defeated Mohamad Ali Vaez	Singles match
7	MVP defeated Matt Cross	Singles match
8	The Young Bucks (Matt Jackson & Nick Jackson) defeated Billy Gunn & Tommy Dreamer	Tag team match

=== House of Hardcore 29 ===
House of Hardcore 29
- Promotion: House of Hardcore
- Date: June 18, 2017
- City: Bassendean, Perth, Western Australia
- Venue: Cyril Jackson Rec Centre

Event chronology
← Previous; House of Hardcore 28	Next → House of Hardcore 30

House of Hardcore 29 was a professional wrestling event produced by House of Hardcore and Aussie All Pro, which took place on June 18, 2017, at the Cyril Jackson Rec Centre in Bassendean, Perth, Western Australia. This event featured appearances by Young Bucks, MVP, Billy Gunn, Colt Cabana and others. Surprise appearances were made by Carlito and The Squad.

No.	Results	Stipulations
1	Colt Cabana defeated Chris Vice	Singles match
2	Aaron O'Malley, Damian Slater & Gavin McGavin (w/ Chris Target) defeated Andrew Carter, Craven & Logan Grey	Six-man tag team match
3	Mark Silva (w/ Dennis Cometti) defeated Hot Young Briley (w/ Mohamad Ali Vaez)	Singles match
4	Billy Gunn defeated Mohamad Ali Vaez	Singles match
5	Bull James defeated Carlito & Tommy Dreamer	Triple threat match
6	Matt Cross defeated Andy Phoenix	Singles match
7	MVP defeated Jake Hager	Singles match
8	Young Bucks (Nick & Matt Jackson) defeated The Squad (Kenny & Mikey)	Tag team match

=== House of Hardcore 30 ===
House of Hardcore 30
- Promotion: House of Hardcore
- Date: June 23, 2017
- City: East Burwood, Melbourne, Victoria, Australia
- Venue: Whitehorse Club

Event chronology
← Previous; House of Hardcore 29	Next → House of Hardcore 31

House of Hardcore 30 was a professional wrestling event produced by House of Hardcore and Aussie All Pro, which took place on June 23, 2017, at the Whitehorse Club in East Burwood, Melbourne, Victoria, Australia. It featured appearances by Colt Cabana, Billy Gunn, Jake Hager, MVP and others. Surprise appearances were made by Carlito and The Squad.

No.	Results	Stipulations
1	Colt Cabana defeated Hot Young Briley	Singles match
2	Carlito defeated The Mighty Cadman	Singles match
3	Mark Silva defeated The Mighty Cadman	Singles match
4	KrackerJak & Mike Burr defeated The Squad (Kenny & Mikey)	Tag team match
5	Billy Gunn defeated Bull James	Singles match
6	Matt Cross defeated Andy Phoenix	Singles match
7	Swoggle defeated Mohamad Ali Vaez	Singles match
8	MVP defeated Jake Hager & Tommy Dreamer	Triple Threat match

=== House of Hardcore 31 ===
House of Hardcore 31
- Promotion: House of Hardcore
- Date: June 24, 2017
- City: Morphettville, Adelaide, South Australia
- Venue: Marion Leisure & Fitness Centre

Event chronology
← Previous; House of Hardcore 30	Next → House of Hardcore 31

House of Hardcore 31 was a professional wrestling event produced by House of Hardcore and Aussie All Pro, which took place on June 24, 2017, at the Marion Leisure & Fitness Centre in Morphettville, Adelaide, South Australia. It featured appearances by Carlito, Jake Hager, Swoggle, MVP, Colt Cabana and others.

No.	Results	Stipulations
1	Carlito defeated Matt Basso	Singles match
2	Bull James, Chris Basso & Nick Armstrong defeated Davey Green, Jonah Rock & Kurt Baron	Six-man tag team match
3	Colt Cobana defeated Mohamad Ali Vaez	Singles match
4	Jake Hager defeated Billy Gunn	Singles match
5	Matt Cross defeated Andy Phoenix	Singles match
6	Swoggle defeated Hot Young Briley	Singles match
7	MVP & Tommy Dreamer defeated The Squad	Tag team match

=== House of Hardcore 32 ===
House of Hardcore 32
- Promotion: House of Hardcore
- Date: August 11, 2017
- City: Freehold, New Jersey
- Venue: iPlay America

Event chronology
← Previous; House of Hardcore 31	Next → House of Hardcore 33

House of Hardcore 32 was a professional wrestling event which took place on August 11, 2017, at iPlay America in Freehold, New Jersey. The event featured appearances by Rock 'n' Roll Express (Ricky Morton and Robert Gibson) and The Sandman as well as the debut of Matthew Robles as the biased Federal Athletic Representative. Commentary was provided by Matt Camp and Daniel Morrison.

No.	Results	Stipulations
1	Matt Striker defeated Vik Dalishus (with The Double Duprees and Katred)	Singles match
2	Angelina Love (with Velvet Sky) defeated Katred (with Vik Dalishus and The Double Duprees)	Singles match
3	Joey Matthews defeated Bull James	Singles match
4	Petey Williams defeated Alex Reynolds (with Maxwell Jacob Friedman)	Singles match
5	Jeff Cobb defeated Nick Aldis	Singles match
6	Bobby Fish defeated Rhett Titus	Singles match
7	Bully Ray defeated Sami Callihan (with JT Davidson)	No Disqualification match
8	The Squad (Kenny and Mikey) (with Randy & TJ Marconi) defeated Team Tremendous (Bill Carr and Dan Barry)	Tag Team match
9	MVP defeated Jake Hager and Tommy Dreamer	Triple threat match

=== House of Hardcore 33 ===
House of Hardcore 33
- Promotion: House of Hardcore
- Date: August 12, 2017
- City: Philadelphia, Pennsylvania
- Venue: 2300 Arena

{{{event}}} chronology
← Previous; House of Hardcore 32	Next → House of Hardcore 34

House of Hardcore 33 was a professional wrestling event that took place on August 12, 2017, at the 2300 Arena in Philadelphia, Pennsylvania. Before the show Road Warrior Animal, Dan Severn, The Patriot, Ted Dibiase, The Blue Meanie and The Killer Bees appeared at the meet and greet. The event featured appearances by Velvet Sky, Angelina Love, The Sandman, Shane Douglas, Matthew Robles and Chris Payne. The show was the first HOH show that featured no advertised matches and it was the final HOH match for Bobby Fish before he joined NXT. Earlier in the day Icons of Wrestling held a convention which featured Jim Ross, Jerry Lawler, Mr. Anderson, Chavo Guerrero Jr. and others. Commentary was provided by Matt Camp and Daniel Morrison.

No.	Results	Stipulations
1	Lance Anoa'i defeated Vik Dalishus (w/ Hale Collins, The Double Duprees, DG Haven and Katred)	Singles match
2	Nick Aldis defeated Bull James	Singles match
3	Rock 'n' Roll Express (Ricky Morton & Robert Gibson) and Bully Ray defeated The Squad (Kenny, Mikey and Randy) (w/ TJ Marconi)	Six-man tag team match
4	Joey Matthews defeated Tommy Dreamer via State Athletic Representative ruling due to Dreamer blood loss	Singles match
5	MVP defeated Rhett Titus	Singles match
6	Petey Williams defeated Alex Reynolds (w/ Maxwell Jacob Friedman), Bobby Fish and Zachary Wentz	Four Way match
7	Matt Striker vs. Dan Barry ended in a no contest	Singles match
8	Jeff Cobb defeated Sami Callihan (w/ JT Davidson)	Singles match

=== House of Hardcore 34 ===
House of Hardcore 34
- Promotion: House of Hardcore
- Date: November 17, 2017
- City: St. James, New York
- Venue: The Sports Arena

Event chronology
← Previous; House of Hardcore 33	Next → House of Hardcore 35

House of Hardcore 34 was a professional wrestling event that took place on November 17, 2017, at The Sports Arena in St. James, New York. Ace Romero, Willie Mack and The Luchasaurus made their debuts at the event, while Austin Aries made his HOH return after leaving WWE. Commentary was provided by Matt Camp and Daniel Morrison.

No.	Results	Stipulations
1	Bull James defeated Hot Young Briley	Singles match
2	Vik Dalishus (w/ Hale Collins, The Double Duprees & Katred) defeated Ace Romero	Singles match
3	The Luchasaurus defeated Alex Reynolds (w/ Maxwell Jacob Friedman)	Singles match
4	Billy Gunn defeated MVP	Singles match
5	Austin Aries defeated Matt Delray	Singles match
6	Petey Williams defeated Willie Mack and Matt Cross	Three way dance
7	Tommy Dreamer, Shane Douglas, Little Guido and Super Crazy defeated Joey Mercury, Nick Aldis and The Squad (Kenny and Mikey) (w/ Randy) (Super Crazy survivor)	Eight-man elimination tag team match

=== House of Hardcore 35 ===
House of Hardcore 35
- Promotion: House of Hardcore
- Date: November 18, 2017
- City: Philadelphia, Pennsylvania
- Venue: 2300 Arena

Event chronology
← Previous; House of Hardcore 34	Next → House of Hardcore 36

House of Hardcore 35 was a professional wrestling event that took place on November 18, 2017, at the 2300 Arena in Philadelphia, Pennsylvania. It was the first HOH event to air live on Twitch. The event featured appearances by Eddie Kingston, Matthew Robles, Shane Douglas and The Sandman as well as the HOH debut of Matt Riddle. Before the event Tommy Dreamer, Nick Aldis and NWA World Champion Tim Storm filmed a segment for Billy Corgan's National Wrestling Alliance. After the Twitch portion of the event ended, Dreamer and Sandman were attacked by Jay Briscoe & Mark Briscoe, continuing Bully Ray and Dreamer's feud with them from Ring of Honor. Earlier in the day, Icons of Wrestling held a convention which featured The New Age Outlaws, Larry Zbyszko, Big Van Vader, Raven and others. Commentary was provided by Matt Camp and Daniel Morrison.

No.	Results	Stipulations	Times
1	Bull James defeated Hot Young Briley	Singles match	4:55
2	MVP defeated Lance Anoa'i	Singles match	6:07
3	Ace Romero defeated Vik Dalishus (w/ Hale Collins and The Double Duprees)	Singles match	7:51
4	Nick Aldis defeated Billy Gunn	Singles match	6:39
5	Matt Cross defeated Petey Williams	Singles match	13:31
6	Little Guido and Super Crazy defeated The Squad (Kenny & Mikey) (w/ Randy)	Tag Team match	8:13
7	Willie Mack defeated The Luchasaurus and Matt Riddle	Triple Threat match	11:16
8	Austin Aries defeated Alex Reynolds (w/ Maxwell Jacob Friedman)	Singles match	6:04
9	Joey Mercury defeated Tommy Dreamer	First Blood match	15:20

=== House of Hardcore 36: Blizzard Brawl Homecoming ===
House of Hardcore 36: Blizzard Brawl Homecoming
- Promotion: House of Hardcore
- Date: December 2, 2017
- City: Waukesha, Wisconsin
- Venue: Waukesha County Expo

Event chronology
← Previous; House of Hardcore 35	Next → House of Hardcore 37

House of Hardcore 36: Blizzard Brawl Homecoming was a professional wrestling event produced by House of Hardcore and broadcast on Twitch, which took place on December 2, 2017, at Waukesha County Expo in Waukesha, Wisconsin. This show featured Candice Michelle wrestling in her final match. This event featured appearances by Brian Stiffler and Matthew Robles as well as Angelina Love and Monique Dupree on the Twitch post-show. Commentary was provided by Dameon Nelson and Daniel Morrison.

No.	Results	Stipulations	Times
1	Guido Maritato defeated Nick Cutler	Singles match	6:49
2	MVP defeated Jay Bradley	Singles match	9:37
3	Nick Aldis (w/ Shane Douglas) defeated Carlito Colon	Singles match	8:35
4	Bull James defeated Connor Braxton, Arik Cannon and Curt Stallion	Fatal four-way match	13:02
5	Willie Mack defeated Brian Cage	Singles match	12:50
6	Al Snow and Swoggle (w/ Dave Herro) defeated The Squad (Kenny & Mikey) (w/ Randy)	Tag Team match	20:58
7	Abyss defeated Tommy Dreamer	Hardcore War Match	13:51
8	Candice Michelle defeated Lisa Marie Varon	Singles match	11:56
9	Austin Aries defeated Joey Mercury (w/ Shane Douglas)	Singles match	19:21

=== House of Hardcore 37 ===
House of Hardcore 37
- Promotion: House of Hardcore
- Date: January 26, 2018
- City: Philadelphia, Pennsylvania
- Venue: 2300 Arena

Event chronology
← Previous; House of Hardcore 36	Next → House of Hardcore 38

House of Hardcore 37 was a professional wrestling event produced by House of Hardcore and broadcast on Twitch, which took place on January 26, 2018, at the 2300 Arena in Philadelphia, Pennsylvania. The event featured appearances by The Blue Meanie, The Sandman and Matthew Robles. Before the show, Jake Roberts, Velvet Sky, Gene Okerlund and Terri Runnels appeared at the Meet & Greet. Other than the tag match, this event consisted entirely of First Round matches in the HOH Twitch Television Championship Tournament, with the Second Round taking place March 24 at the 2300 Arena. Commentary was provided by Matt Camp and Daniel Morrison.

No.	Results	Stipulations
1	Swoggle defeated Mikey (w/ Randy)	HOH Twitch Television Championship Tournament – First Round Match
2	Kenny (w/ Mikey & Randy) defeated Lisa Marie Varon	HOH Twitch Television Championship Tournament – First Round Match
3	Bull James defeated Eddie Kingston	HOH Twitch Television Championship Tournament – First Round Match
4	Alex Reynolds (w/ Maxwell Jacob Friedman) defeated Super Crazy	HOH Twitch Television Championship Tournament – First Round Match
5	Crazzy Steve defeated Maxwell Jacob Friedman (w/ Alex Reynolds)	HOH Twitch Television Championship Tournament – First Round Match
6	Killer Kross defeated Guido Maritato	HOH Twitch Television Championship Tournament – First Round Match
7	Dan Maff defeated Ace Romero	HOH Twitch Television Championship Tournament – First Round Match
8	Tommy Dreamer & Billy Gunn (w/ Bully Ray) defeated Joey Mercury & Nick Aldis (w/ Shane Douglas)	Hardcore War
9	Austin Aries defeated Matt Riddle	HOH Twitch Television Championship Tournament – First Round Match
10	Willie Mack defeated Luchasaurus & Matt Cross	HOH Twitch Television Championship Tournament – First Round Triple Threat Match
11	Brian Cage defeated Sami Callihan (w/ JT Davidson)	HOH Twitch Television Championship Tournament – First Round Match

=== House of Hardcore 38 ===
House of Hardcore 38
- Promotion: House of Hardcore
- Date: March 23, 2018
- City: St. James, New York
- Venue: The Sports Arena

Event chronology
← Previous; House of Hardcore 37	Next → House of Hardcore 39

House of Hardcore 38 was a professional wrestling event produced by House of Hardcore, which took place on March 23, 2018, at The Sports Arena in St. James, New York. The event featured an appearance by Matthew Robles and a defense of the NWA World Heavyweight Championship. Austin Idol, Flip Gordon, Sam Adonis, Trey Miguel and Clayton Gainz made their HOH debuts at this event. Commentary was provided by Matt Camp and Daniel Morrison.

No.	Results	Stipulations
1	Trey Miguel defeated Clayton Gainz	Singles match
2	Ace Romero defeated Sam Adonis	Singles match
3	Killer Kross defeated Guido Maritato	Submission match
4	Bull James defeated Alex Reynolds	Singles match
5	Nick Aldis (c) (w/ Austin Idol) defeated Lance Anoa'i	Singles match for the NWA World Heavyweight Championship
6	Tommy Dreamer defeated Joey Mercury	Long Island Street Fight
7	Matt Cross defeated Flip Gordon	Singles match
8	Crazzy Steve & Swoggle defeated Squad World Order (Kenny & Mikey) (w/ Randy)	Tag team match
9	Willie Mack defeated Sami Callihan & Brian Cage	Three-Way Dance
(c) / – the champion(s) heading into the match

=== House of Hardcore 39 ===
House of Hardcore 39
- Promotion: House of Hardcore
- Date: March 24, 2018
- City: Philadelphia, Pennsylvania
- Venue: 2300 Arena

Event chronology
← Previous; House of Hardcore 38	Next → House of Hardcore 40

House of Hardcore 39 was a professional wrestling event produced by House of Hardcore and broadcast on Twitch, which took place on March 24, 2018, at the 2300 Arena in Philadelphia, Pennsylvania. The event featured appearances by Bully Ray and Joey Mercury. This show featured Second Round matches in the HOH Twitch Television Championship Tournament, though injuries to Dan Maff, Luchasaurus and Austin Aries's Impact Wrestling commitment forced some matchup changes. The HOH Twitch Television Championship was unveiled on this show and it was awarded on April 7, 2018, at House of Hardcore 40. This show represented the first NWA World Heavyweight Championship match at 2300 Arena since August 27, 1994 when Shane Douglas threw down the title in favor of ECW. Commentary was provided by Matt Camp and Daniel Morrison.

No.	Results	Stipulations
1	Trey Miguel defeated Clayton Gainz (w/ The Double Duprees)	Singles match
2	Swoggle defeated Kenny (w/ Mikey & Randy)	HOH Twitch Television Championship Tournament – Second Round Match
3	Sam Adonis (w/ Matthew Robles) defeated Titan Dennis Jackson	Singles match
4	Alex Reynolds (w/ Maxwell Jacob Friedman/MJF) defeated Crazzy Steve	HOH Twitch Television Championship Tournament – Second Round Match
5	Killer Kross defeated Bull James	HOH Twitch Television Championship Tournament – Second Round Match
6	Flip Gordon defeated Matt Cross	Singles match
7	Sami Callihan defeated MJF & Ace Romero (Callihan earns spot in Tournament Finals)	HOH Twitch Television Championship Tournament – Second Chance Triple Threat Match
8	Willie Mack defeated Brian Cage	HOH Twitch Television Championship Tournament – Second Round Match
9	Nick Aldis (c) (w/ Austin Idol) defeated Tommy Dreamer	Singles match for the NWA World Heavyweight Championship
(c) / – the champion(s) heading into the match

=== House of Hardcore 40 ===
House of Hardcore 40
- Promotion: House of Hardcore
- Date: April 7, 2018
- City: New Orleans, Louisiana
- Venue: The Sugar Mill

Event chronology
← Previous; House of Hardcore 39	Next → House of Hardcore 41

House of Hardcore 40 was a professional wrestling event produced by House of Hardcore and broadcast on Twitch, which took place on April 7, 2018, at the Sugar Mill in New Orleans, Louisiana. This event featured the Semi-final and Final matches in the HOH Twitch Television Championship Tournament with Willie Mack being crowned the first champion in the promotion's history. The title's first defense was on May 18, 2018, at House of Hardcore 42. This event which took place in conjunction with WrestleCon and Impact Wrestling happened at midnight during Wrestlemania 34 weekend. Commentary was provided by Matt Camp and Daniel Morrison.

No.	Results	Stipulations
1	J. Spade defeated Matt Lancie	Singles match
2	Alex Reynolds (w/ Maxwell Jacob Friedman/MJF & The Double Duprees) defeated Swoggle	HOH Twitch Television Championship Tournament Semi-final Match
3	Willie Mack defeated Killer Kross	HOH Twitch Television Championship Tournament Semi-final Match
4	Rock 'n' Roll Express (Ricky Morton & Robert Gibson) and Hurricane Helms defeated Squad World Order (Kenny, Mikey and Randy)	Six-man tag team match
5	MVP defeated Carlito	Singles match
6	Joey Ryan defeated Teddy Hart	Singles match
7	Super Crazy defeated Ace Romero, Clayton Gainz and Trey Miguel and Myron Reed	Fatal five-way match
8	Austin Aries defeated Brian Cage	Singles match
9	Killer Elite Squad (Davey Boy Smith Jr. & Lance Archer) (with Matthew Robles) defeated Tommy Dreamer and Billy Gunn	Bourbon Street Fight
10	Willie Mack defeated Sami Callihan and Alex Reynolds (with MJF)	Triple Threat HOH Twitch Television Championship Tournament Final with Jerry Lynn as the special guest referee

=== House of Hardcore 41 ===
House of Hardcore 41
- Promotion: House of Hardcore
- Date: April 28, 2018
- City: Fort Wayne, Indiana
- Venue: Grand Wayne Convention Center

Event chronology
← Previous; House of Hardcore 40	Next → House of Hardcore 42

House of Hardcore 41 was a professional wrestling event co-produced by House of Hardcore and Wrestling For Warriors, which took place on April 28, 2018, at the Grand Wayne Convention Center in Fort Wayne, Indiana. This show was a "Hardcore for Charity" event which benefited children's charities in the area. The Moose/Kong and Edwards/Callihan matches were shown on the May 10 and 17 episodes of Impact Wrestling's Impact! respectively. This show was shown on Twitch on July 1, 2018. Commentary was provided by Joe Nebroski and Marcus Mann.

No.	Results	Stipulations
1	Hardcore Holly defeated Kevin Thorn	Singles match
2	Benjamin Boone defeated Clayton Gainz, Trey Miguel, JD Smooth, Anthony Toatele, Slim Trimmons, James Rampage, Ryan Kidd, Zack Call, Lennox King, JC Bunyan, Troy Miller, J-Rocc, Gory, Johnny Plexx and Badd Blood Barron (Boone earns WFW Title shot)	Rumble For Warriors match
3	Angelina Love defeated Paredyse (w/ Rebel)	Intergender match
4	Nick Cutler (c) defeated Matt Cross	Singles match for Wrestling For Warriors Children's Championship
5	Moose defeated Kongo Kong (w/ Jimmy Jacobs) via Disqualification	Singles match
6	Al Snow defeated Officer Rod Street (w/ Sheriff Eva Lonis & The Swat Team)	Singles match
7	Tommy Dreamer & Ace Romero defeated War Kings (Crimson & Jax Dane) (w/ Monique Dupree)	Tag Team match
8	Eddie Edwards defeated Sami Callihan	Fort Wayne Street Fight
(c) / – the champion(s) heading into the match

=== House of Hardcore 42 ===
House of Hardcore 42
- Promotion: House of Hardcore
- Date: May 18, 2018
- City: Hanover, Massachusetts
- Venue: Starland Sportsplex

Event chronology
← Previous; House of Hardcore 41	Next → House of Hardcore 43

House of Hardcore 42 was a professional wrestling event produced by House of Hardcore in conjunction with Chaotic Wrestling, which took place on May 18, 2018, at the Starland Sportsplex in Hanover, Massachusetts. This event was HOH's debut in Massachusetts. Matthew Robles made an appearance on this event, which also featured the first HOH Twitch Television Championship defense. Commentary was provided by Matt Camp and Daniel Morrison.

No.	Results	Stipulations
1	Bull James defeated Anthony Greene (w/ The Platinum Honeys)	Singles match
2	Alisha Edwards defeated Chelsea Green (w/ Clayton Gainz)	Singles match
3	Joey Mercury defeated Ace Romero	Singles match
4	Teddy Goodz defeated Paredyse (w/ Rebel)	Singles match
5	Josh Briggs defeated Chris Dickinson	Singles match
6	J. T. Dunn (c) defeated Tommy Dreamer and Alex Reynolds	Triple threat match for the CW Heavyweight Championship
7	Willie Mack (c) defeated Brian Cage	Singles match for the HOH Twitch Television Championship
8	Squad World Order (Kenny, Mikey and Randy) defeated Mill City Hooligans (Matt Logan, Chase Del Monte and Bryan Logan)	Six-man tag team match
9	Eddie Edwards defeated Sami Callihan	Boston Street Fight
(c) / – the champion(s) heading into the match

=== House of Hardcore 43 ===
House of Hardcore 43
- Promotion: House of Hardcore
- Date: May 19, 2018 (aired July 29, 2018)
- City: Philadelphia, Pennsylvania
- Venue: 2300 Arena

Event chronology
← Previous; House of Hardcore 42	Next → House of Hardcore 44

House of Hardcore 43 was a professional wrestling event produced by House of Hardcore, which took place on May 19, 2018, at the 2300 Arena in Philadelphia, Pennsylvania. The Moose/Drake match and the Edwards heel turn on Dreamer were shown on the June 14 and 28 episodes of Impact Wrestling's Impact! respectively. Barbie Blank and Matthew Robles made appearances on this show. This event aired on Twitch on July 29, 2018. Commentary was provided by Matt Camp and Daniel Morrison.

No.	Results	Stipulations
1	Bull James defeated Joey Mercury	Singles match
2	Chelsea Green defeated Paredyse (w/ Rebel)	Intergender match
3	Clayton Gainz (w/ The Double Duprees) defeated Ace Austin	Singles match
4	Moose defeated Eli Drake	Singles match
5	The Latin American Xchange (Santana and Ortiz) defeated Squad World Order (Kenny and Mikey) (w/ Randy)	Tag team match
6	Alex Reynolds defeated J. T. Dunn	Singles match
7	Brian Cage defeated Ace Romero	Singles match
8	oVe (Dave Crist and Jake Crist) defeated Tommy Dreamer and Eddie Edwards	Tag Team Street Fight match
9	Willie Mack (c) defeated Sami Callihan	Singles match for the HOH Twitch Television Championship
(c) / – the champion(s) heading into the match

=== House of Hardcore 44 ===
House of Hardcore 44
- Promotion: House of Hardcore
- Date: June 1, 2018
- City: Napanee, Ontario
- Venue: Lennox Agricultural Memorial Community Centre

Event chronology
← Previous; House of Hardcore 43	Next → House of Hardcore 44

House of Hardcore 44 was a professional wrestling event co-produced by House of Hardcore and Chinlock Wrestling, which took place on June 1, 2018, at the Lennox Agricultural Memorial Community Centre in Napanee, Ontario. This event was the first time the HOH Twitch Television Championship was defended outside the US. This show featured a musical performance by Solomon Woodland.

No.	Results	Stipulations
1	Billy Gunn defeated Robert Strauss	Singles match
2	Bull James & RJ City (w/ Monique Dupree & Jan Murphy) defeated Squad World Order (Kenny and Mikey) (w/ Randy)	Tag team match
3	Tommy Dreamer defeated Pepper Parks	Extreme Rules match
4	Willie Mack (c) defeated Alex Reynolds and Maxwell Jacob Friedman/MJF	Triple Threat Match for the HOH Twitch Television Championship
(c) / – the champion(s) heading into the match

=== House of Hardcore 45 ===
House of Hardcore 45
- Promotion: House of Hardcore
- Date: June 2, 2018
- City: Massena, New York
- Venue: Massena Arena

Event chronology
← Previous; House of Hardcore 44	Next → House of Hardcore 46

House of Hardcore 45 was a professional wrestling event produced by House of Hardcore, which took place on June 2, 2018, at the Massena Arena in Massena, New York.

No.	Results	Stipulations
1	Willie Mack (c) defeated Pepper Parks	Singles match for the HOH Twitch Television Championship
(c) / – the champion(s) heading into the match

=== House of Hardcore 46 ===
House of Hardcore 46
- Promotion: House of Hardcore
- Date: July 11, 2018
- City: Claremont, Perth, Western Australia
- Venue: Gate One Theatre at Claremont Showground

Event chronology
← Previous; House of Hardcore 45	Next → House of Hardcore 47

House of Hardcore 46 was a professional wrestling event produced by House of Hardcore, which took place on July 11, 2018, at the Gate One Theatre at Claremont Showground in Claremont, Perth, Western Australia. This event featured a defense of the NWA World Heavyweight Championship and the HOH Twitch Television Championship marking that title's first defense in Australia. Surprise appearances were made by Swoggle and Lance Archer.

No.	Results	Stipulations
1	Angelina Love (w/ Velvet Sky) defeated Lena Kross	Singles match
2	Billy Gunn defeated Lance Archer	Singles match
3	The Untouchables (Damian Slater & Marcius Pitt) defeated Craven & Mohamad Ali Vaez	Tag team match
4	Nick Aldis (c) defeated Mark Cometti	Singles match for the NWA World Heavyweight Championship
5	Al Snow defeated Joey Mercury	Extreme Rules match
6	Bully Ray, Swoggle and Tommy Dreamer defeated Squad World Order (Kenny, Mikey and Randy)	Six-man tag team match
7	Willie Mack (c) defeated Andy Phoenix	Singles match for the HOH Twitch Television Championship
(c) / – the champion(s) heading into the match

=== House of Hardcore 47 ===
House of Hardcore 47
- Promotion: House of Hardcore
- Date: July 13, 2018
- City: Kensington, Melbourne, Victoria, Australia
- Venue: Melbourne Pavilion

Event chronology
← Previous; House of Hardcore 46	Next → House of Hardcore 48

House of Hardcore 47 was a professional wrestling event produced by House of Hardcore, which took place on July 13, 2018, at the Melbourne Pavilion in Kensington, Melbourne, Victoria, Australia. This event featured a defense of the NWA World Heavyweight Championship and the HOH Twitch Television Championship. Surprise appearances were made by Swoggle and Lance Archer with Mick Foley appearing as part of his 20 Years of Hell comedy tour.

No.	Results	Stipulations
1	Al Snow defeated Mike Burr	Singles match
2	Billy Gunn defeated Lance Archer	Singles match
3	Madison Eagles defeated Angelina Love (w/ Velvet Sky) and Erika Reid	Three-Way match
4	Bully Ray defeated Mohamad Ali Vaez	Tables Match
5	Nick Aldis (c) defeated Jonah Rock	Singles match for the NWA World Heavyweight Championship
6	Mark Cometti and Swoggle defeated Squad World Order (Kenny and Mikey) (w/ Randy)	Tag team match with Mick Foley as Guest Enforcer
7	Tommy Dreamer defeated Joey Mercury	First Blood match
8	Willie Mack (c) defeated Andy Phoenix, JXT and Slade Mercer	Four-way match for the HOH Twitch Television Championship
(c) / – the champion(s) heading into the match

=== House of Hardcore 48 ===
House of Hardcore 48
- Promotion: House of Hardcore
- Date: July 14, 2018
- City: Hurstville, Sydney, New South Wales, Australia
- Venue: Hurstville Entertainment Centre

Event chronology
← Previous; House of Hardcore 47	Next → House of Hardcore 49

House of Hardcore 48 was a professional wrestling event produced by House of Hardcore, which took place on July 14, 2018, at the Hurstville Entertainment Centre in Hurstville, Sydney, New South Wales, Australia. This event featured a defense of the NWA World Heavyweight Championship and the HOH Twitch Television Championship. Surprise appearances were made by Swoggle and Lance Archer and an appearance by Mick Foley as a part of his 20 Years of Hell comedy tour.

No.	Results	Stipulations
1	Billy Gunn defeated Lance Archer	Singles match
2	Joey Mercury defeated Caveman Ugg	Singles match
3	Al Snow defeated Mohamad Ali Vaez	Singles match
4	Nick Aldis (c) defeated Robbie Eagles	Singles match for the NWA World Heavyweight Championship
5	Angelina Love (w/ Velvet Sky) defeated Madison Eagles and Shazza McKenzie	Triple threat match
6	Willie Mack (c) defeated Andy Phoenix	Singles match for the HOH Twitch Television Championship
7	Bully Ray, Swoggle and Tommy Dreamer defeated Squad World Order (Kenny, Mikey and Randy)	Six-man tag team Extreme Rules match
(c) / – the champion(s) heading into the match

=== House of Hardcore 49 ===
House of Hardcore 49
- Promotion: House of Hardcore
- Date: July 15, 2018
- City: Palmview, Sunshine Coast, Queensland, Australia
- Venue: The Shed at Aussie World

Event chronology
← Previous; House of Hardcore 48	Next → House of Hardcore 50

House of Hardcore 49 was a professional wrestling event produced by House of Hardcore, which took place on July 15, 2018, at The Shed at Aussie World in Palmview, Sunshine Coast, Queensland, Australia. This event featured a defense of the NWA World Heavyweight Championship and the HOH Twitch Television Championship. Surprise appearances were made by Swoggle and Lance Archer and an appearance by Mick Foley as a part of his 20 Years of Hell comedy tour.

No.	Results	Stipulations
1	Al Snow defeated Mohamad Ali Vaez	Singles match
2	E.C. Diamond defeated Thirteen	Singles match
3	Swoggle defeated Joey Mercury	Singles match
4	Nick Aldis (c) defeated Jack Bonza	Singles match for the NWA World Heavyweight Championship
5	Shazza McKenzie defeated Madison Eagles	Singles match
6	Angelina Love, Billy Gunn and Bully Ray (w/ Velvet Sky) defeated Squad World Order (Kenny, Mikey and Randy)	Six-person tag team match
7	Lance Archer defeated Tommy Dreamer	Hardcore War match
8	Willie Mack (c) defeated Andy Phoenix	Singles match for the HOH Twitch Television Championship
(c) / – the champion(s) heading into the match

=== House of Hardcore 50 ===
House of Hardcore 50
- Promotion: House of Hardcore
- Date: September 3, 2018
- City: Concord, Virginia
- Venue: DeVault Vineyards

Event chronology
← Previous; House of Hardcore 49	Next → House of Hardcore 51

House of Hardcore 50 was a professional wrestling event produced by House of Hardcore, which took place on September 3, 2018, at the DeVault Vineyards in Concord, Virginia. This event took place during the Blue Ridge Rock Festival. The Sandman and New Jack made appearances on this show.

No.	Results	Stipulations
1	Hurricane Helms defeated C. W. Anderson	Singles match
2	Stan Lee defeated "Progressive Liberal" Daniel Richards	Singles match
3	Gym Nasty Boyz (Timmy Lou Retton and White Mike) defeated Safety First	Tag team match
4	Trevor Lee defeated John Skyler	Singles match
5	Billy Gunn and Carlito defeated Dawson Brothers (Dave and Zane Dawson)	Tag team match
6	Tommy Dreamer defeated Sami Callihan	Extreme Rules match

=== House of Hardcore 51: Blizzard Brawl-For It All ===
House of Hardcore 51: Blizzard Brawl-For It All
- Promotion: House of Hardcore
- Date: December 1, 2018
- City: Waukesha, Wisconsin
- Venue: Waukesha County Expo

Event chronology
← Previous; House of Hardcore 50	Next → House of Hardcore 52

House of Hardcore 51: Blizzard Brawl-For It All was a professional wrestling event produced by House of Hardcore, which took place on December 1, 2018, at Waukesha County Expo in Waukesha, Wisconsin. This show featured the last ever Hardcore War between Tommy Dreamer and Abyss as well as appearances by Sean Waltman and Road Warrior Animal. This event featured the HOH debuts of Big Ca$$ and Eugene along with the pro wrestling debut of Kal Herro.

No.	Results	Stipulations
1	Eugene defeated Richard Maxwell	Singles match
2	Swoggle defeated Bullet Proof and TW3	Triple Threat match
3	MVP defeated Big Ca$$	Singles match
4	Al Snow and Kal Herro (w/ Dave Herro) defeated Robert Strauss and Jay Bradley (w/ Damien Nelson)	Tag team match
5	Abyss defeated Tommy Dreamer	Hardcore War Match
6	The Latin American Xchange (Santana and Ortiz) defeated Jimmy Jacobs and Clayton Gainz (w/ The Double Duprees)	Tag team match
7	Willie Mack (c) defeated Sami Callihan	Singles match for the HOH Twitch Television Championship
(c) / – the champion(s) heading into the match

=== House of Hardcore 52: Indie Darlings ===
House of Hardcore 52: Indie Darlings
- Promotion: House of Hardcore
- Date: December 8, 2018
- City: Philadelphia, Pennsylvania
- Venue: 2300 Arena

Event chronology
← Previous; House of Hardcore 51	Next → House of Hardcore For Charity

House of Hardcore 52: Indie Darlings was a professional wrestling event that took place on December 8, 2018, at the 2300 Arena in Philadelphia, Pennsylvania. This event featured defenses of the NWA World Heavyweight Championship, HOH Twitch Television Championship and the NWA National Heavyweight Championship. Appearances on this show were made by Vik Dalishus, Hale Collins, The Sandman, Bully Ray and Tommy Dreamer with Big Ca$$, Gail Kim, D'Lo Brown and Rebel appearing on the Meet & Greet. Commentary was provided by Matt Camp and Daniel Morrison. Earlier in the day, Icons of Wrestling held a convention with Jeff Jarrett, Renee Young, Lenny Dykstra and others appearing. During the intermission, Big Ca$$ would suffer a seizure that required a trip to a hospital for him.

No.	Results	Stipulations
1	Fallah Bahh defeated Ethan Page	Singles match
2	Britt Baker defeated Angelina Love (w/ Velvet Sky)	Singles match
3	Gangrel defeated Alex Reynolds	Singles match
4	Ace Austin defeated Jake Crist and Clayton Gainz (w/ The Double Duprees)	Triple Threat match
5	Arquette City (David Arquette and RJ City) defeated Robert Strauss and Tyrus	Tag Team match
6	Nick Aldis (c) defeated Brian Cage	Singles match for the NWA World Heavyweight Championship
7	The Briscoe Brothers (Jay Briscoe and Mark Briscoe) defeated Teddy Hart and Rich Swann	Tag team match
8	The Blue Meanie defeated Joey Ryan	Thumb War match
9	Willie Mack (c) defeated Shane Strickland	Singles match for the HOH Twitch Television Championship and the NWA National Heavyweight Championship
(c) / – the champion(s) heading into the match

=== House of Hardcore for Charity ===
House of Hardcore for Charity
- Promotion: House of Hardcore
- Date: December 15, 2018
- City: Woodbridge, New Jersey
- Venue: Woodbridge High School

Event chronology
← Previous; House of Hardcore 52	Next → House of Hardcore 53

House of Hardcore for Charity was a professional wrestling event produced by House of Hardcore, which took place on December 15, 2018, at the Woodbridge High School in Woodbridge, New Jersey. This show was a charity show that raised money for the Woodbridge High School athletic department. This show featured talent with local connections including Robert Strauss who taught at the school and Danny Doring who attended the school. SiriusXM Busted Open Radio host Dave Lagreca made his debut as a referee in the main event.

No.	Results	Stipulations
1	Giovanni defeated Wrecking Ball Legursky	Singles match
2	Dennis Morgan defeated #MCM (Man Crush Monday)	Singles match
3	Danny Doring defeated Crowbar	Singles match
4	Alex Reynolds (w/ The Double Duprees) defeated Lance Anoaʻi	Singles match
5	Karen Q defeated Tasha Steelz	Singles match
6	Ray Jaz defeated Matt Vides	Singles match
7	Tommy Dreamer and Robert Strauss defeated Damian Adams and Byson (w/ Randy Shawn and Reily Shepard)	Tag team match with Dave Lagreca as the special guest referee

=== House of Hardcore 53 ===
House of Hardcore 53
- Promotion: House of Hardcore
- Date: June 1, 2019
- City: Nashville, Tennessee
- Venue: Tennessee State Fairground Sports Arena

Event chronology
← Previous; House of Hardcore For Charity	Next → House of Hardcore 54

House of Hardcore 53 – Farewell to the Fairgrounds was a professional wrestling event co-produced by House of Hardcore and Overdrive Pro Wrestling, which took place on June 1, 2019, at the Tennessee State Fairground Sports Arena in Nashville, Tennessee. This show was the final wrestling show at the fairgrounds before they are torn down for redevelopment. James Storm and Michael St. John made appearances on this event. Willie Mack, Johnny Impact and Taya Valkyrie were originally scheduled but missed the show due to travel difficulties. Footage of Moose attacking Tommy Dreamer was shown on the June 28, 2019 episode of Impact!.

No.	Results	Stipulations	Times
1	Swoggle defeated "The Main Feature" Rich Maxwell	Singles match	5:17
2	Adrian Thomas defeated DJ Brown, Cody Windham and Bryan	Fatal four-way match	8:14
3	War Kings (Crimson & Jax Dane) and Bill Dundee defeated Greg Anthony, P-Dog and David Lee Lorenze III (w/ Shiloh Jonze)	Six-person tag team match	8:30
4	Guido Maritato (w/ Tracy Smothers) defeated LT Falk (w/ Tony Falk)	Singles match	9:22
5	Eddie Edwards defeated Moose (w/ The Double Duprees)	Singles match	16:14
6	Bram defeated Tommy Dreamer	Nashville Street Fight	13:25
7	Rock 'n' Roll Express (Ricky Morton & Robert Gibson) defeated SoCal Uncensored (Christopher Daniels & Frankie Kazarian)	Tag team match	8:38

=== House of Hardcore 54 ===
House of Hardcore 54
- Promotion: House of Hardcore
- Date: June 8, 2019
- City: Philadelphia, Pennsylvania
- Venue: 2300 Arena

Event chronology
← Previous; House of Hardcore 53	Next → House of Hardcore 55

House of Hardcore 54 – A Night You Can't Mist was a professional wrestling event co-produced by House of Hardcore and Impact Wrestling, which took place on June 8, 2019, at the 2300 Arena in Philadelphia, Pennsylvania. This event was broadcast on Impact Plus and Fite. This show had appearances by Melissa Santos, Jimmy Jacobs, The Sandman, Joey Ryan and D'Lo Brown with Brian Cage and The Blue Meanie appearing on the preshow Meet & Greet. Commentary was provided by Josh Mathews and Scott D'Amore. The match between Joey Ryan and Billy Gunn didn't take place due to Gunn having travel difficulties. This event featured title defenses of the HOH Twitch Television Championship and the Impact Knockouts Championship. Earlier in the day, Icons of Wrestling held a convention with Bret Hart, Scott Hall, Harley Race, Pentagón Jr. and others appearing.

No.	Results	Stipulations
1^{D}	JXT defeated Ace Romero	Singles match
2	The Rascalz (Dezmond Xavier, Trey Miguel and Zachary Wentz) defeated oVe (Madman Fulton and Dave & Jake Crist)	Six-person tag team match
3	Moose defeated Luchasaurus	Singles match
4	Guido Maritato defeated Clayton Gainz (w/ The Double Duprees)	Singles match
5	Taya Valkyrie (w/ John E. Bravo) (c) defeated Jordynne Grace	Singles match for the Impact Knockouts Championship
6	Willie Mack (c) defeated Teddy Hart and Rich Swann	Triple threat match for the HOH Twitch Television Championship
7	Sami Callihan defeated Eddie Edwards	South Philly street fight
8	The Great Muta and Tommy Dreamer defeated Johnny Impact and Michael Elgin (w/ Taya Valkyrie & John E. Bravo)	Tag team match
(c) / – the champion(s) heading into the match; D / – this was a dark match

=== House of Hardcore 55 ===
House of Hardcore 55
- Promotion: House of Hardcore
- Date: June 9, 2019
- City: St. James, New York
- Venue: The Sports Arena

Event chronology
← Previous; House of Hardcore 54	Next → House of Hardcore Chinlock For Charity

House of Hardcore 55 – Digital Destruction was a professional wrestling event co-produced by House of Hardcore and Impact Wrestling, which took place on June 9, 2019, at The Sports Arena in St. James, New York. This event was broadcast on Impact Wrestling's Twitch channel. This event had appearances by Melissa Santos and Jimmy Jacobs with Josh Mathews and Scott D'Amore performing commentary. The Great Muta, Brian Cage and Monique Dupree appeared on the preshow Meet & Greet. This show featured title defenses of the HOH Twitch Television Championship and the Impact X Division Championship.

No.	Results	Stipulations
1	Gio defeated Wrecking Ball Legursky	Singles match
2	Trey Miguel defeated JXT, Bull James and Clayton Gainz (w/ Monet Dupree)	Four-way match
3	Joey Ryan defeated Guido Maritato	Singles match
4	Michael Elgin defeated Luchasaurus	Singles match
5	The Rascalz (Dezmond Xavier & Zachary Wentz) defeated oVe (Dave & Jake Crist)	Tag team match
6	Madman Fulton defeated Ace Romero via Referee Stoppage	Singles match
7	Rich Swann (c) defeated Teddy Hart	Singles match for the Impact X Division Championship
8	Willie Mack (c) defeated Sami Callihan and Eddie Edwards	Triple threat match for the HOH Twitch Television Championship
9	Tommy Dreamer, Billy Gunn and Jordynne Grace defeated Johnny Impact, Moose and Taya Valkyrie (w/ John E. Bravo)	Six-person tag team match
(c) / – the champion(s) heading into the match

=== House of Hardcore Chinlock For Charity ===
House of Hardcore Chinlock For Charity
- Promotion: House of Hardcore
- Date: June 15, 2019
- City: Kingston, Ontario
- Venue: Leon's Centre

Event chronology
← Previous; House of Hardcore 55	Next → House of Hardcore 56

House of Hardcore Chinlock For Charity was a professional wrestling event produced by House of Hardcore and Chinlock Wrestling, which took place on June 15, 2019, at Leon's Centre in Kingston, Ontario. This show was a charity show that raised money for the Youth Diversion and other local charities. This event had an appearance by The Sandman. Bret Hart, Mark Henry, Lex Luger, Tully Blanchard, Jimmy Hart and Tugboat appeared on a legends meet & greet. This show featured title defences of the HOH Twitch Television Championship, Chinlock Heavyweight Championship and the crowning of the inaugural Kale Murphy Memorial Championship.

No.	Results	Stipulations
1	Gio Galvano defeated "Millennial" Chris Mojo	Singles match
2	CJ Felony defeated Bill Welychka	Semi-final match for the Kale Murphy Title Tournament
3	Swoggle defeated RJ City	Singles match
4	Sebastian Suave defeated Ray St-Jean (w/ Monique Dupree)	Singles match
5	CJ Felony defeated KL Shock	Tournament Final for the Kale Murphy Memorial Championship
6	Jan Murphy won the 25 Man Chinlock Rumble	Chinlock Rumble
7	"Catalyst" Nic Williams and Freak Nation (Madman Taylor & Sideshow Jack) defeated Deeno Benjamin and Double Dragon (Big Buddha & Justin Tyme)	Six-person tag team match
8	Beautiful Beaa defeated Jessie Mack (c), Madison Rayne and Addy Starr	Four-way match for the Chinlock Heavyweight Championship
9	Willie Mack (c) defeated Pepper Parks	Singles match for the HOH Twitch Television Championship with Jimmy Korderas as the special guest referee
10	Tommy Dreamer & Billy Gunn defeated Tyson Dux & Tarik The Great	Tag team match
(c) / – the champion(s) heading into the match

=== House of Hardcore 56 ===
House of Hardcore 56
- Promotion: House of Hardcore
- Date: November 23, 2019
- City: Philadelphia, Pennsylvania
- Venue: 2300 Arena

Event chronology
← Previous; House of Hardcore Chinlock For Charity	Next → House of Hardcore 57

House of Hardcore 56 was a professional wrestling event produced by House of Hardcore, which took place on November 23, 2019, at the 2300 Arena in Philadelphia, Pennsylvania. This show had appearances by Masahiro Chono and Stan Hansen with Magnum T. A., Nikita Koloff, J. J. Dillon and The Blue Meanie appearing on the preshow Meet & Greet. This event featured a title defense of the Impact X Division Championship as well as talent from AEW, Impact, MLW and ROH. This show is notable for HOH Twitch Television Champion Willie Mack's first pinfall loss in HOH in a non-title match and the debut of Vik Dalishus on commentary joining Daniel Morrison. Earlier in the day, Icons of Wrestling held a convention with Sid Vicious, Ron Simmons, Brutus Beefcake, Jordynne Grace and others appearing. The X Division Title Match aired on the January 14, 2020 episode of Impact Wrestling's Impact!

No.	Results	Stipulations
1	Crazzy Steve defeated Clayton Gainz (w/ The Double Duprees)	Singles match
2	Johnny Swinger defeated "Action" Mike Jackson	Singles match
3	Billy Gunn defeated Wrecking Ball Legursky	Singles match
4	Ace Austin (c) defeated Eddie Edwards, Moose and Fallah Bahh	Four-way match for the Impact X Division Championship
5	Tommy Dreamer and Bully Ray vs. Orange Cassidy and Sonny Kiss ended in a No Contest	Tag team match
6	Tommy Dreamer, Bully Ray, Orange Cassidy and Sonny Kiss defeated The Unsigned (Alex Reynolds, Clayton Gainz, Wrecking Ball Legursky and Chris Mojo)	Eight-man tag team match with Dave Lagreca as the special guest referee
7	Alex Reynolds defeated Leroy Green	Singles match
8	Private Party (Isiah Kassidy and Marq Quen) defeated Best Friends (Trent? and Chuck Taylor)	Tag team match
9	Jacob Fatu defeated Willie Mack	Singles match
(c) / – the champion(s) heading into the match

=== House of Hardcore 57: Blizzard Brawl "Challenge of The SuperFriends" ===
House of Hardcore 57: Blizzard Brawl
- Promotion: House of Hardcore
- Date: December 7, 2019
- City: Waukesha, Wisconsin
- Venue: Waukesha County Expo

Event chronology
← Previous; House of Hardcore 56	Next → —

House of Hardcore 57: Blizzard Brawl was a professional wrestling event produced by House of Hardcore and Great Lake Championship Wrestling, which took place on December 7, 2019, at Waukesha County Expo in Waukesha, Wisconsin and was also the final event promoted by House of Hardcore before the company was closed. This event featured talent from AEW, Impact, MLW and ROH. The Godfather, Rikishi, and Monique Dupree appeared on the preshow meet & greet.

No.	Results	Stipulations
1	Johnny Swashbuckle and TW3 defeated Koda Jacobs, J-Cash and Mario Crivello (w/ Angel Armani)	Handicap tag team match
2	Arik Cannon, Jax Dane and Beer City Bruiser defeated Jay Bradley, Ryan Kross and Jeff Luxon	Six man tag team match
3	Backwoods Brown (w/ Val Malone) defeated Adam Grace (w/ Val Malone) and Joey Avalon	Three Way Dance
4	Tommy Dreamer vs. Al Snow ended in a No Contest	Singles match
5	Tommy Dreamer and Al Snow defeated Jeff Luxon and Ryan Kross	Tag team match
6	ODB (c) defeated Melina Perez	Singles match for the GLCW Woman's Championship
7	Luchasaurus, Marko Stunt and Kal Herro defeated Shawn Spears, Swoggle and Nick Colucci	Six man tag team match
8	Jacob Fatu and Sefa Fatu (w/ Rikishi) defeated Davey Boy Smith Jr. and Mr. Anderson	Tag team match
(c) / – the champion(s) heading into the match

== House of Hardcore 58 ==
House of Hardcore 58 was originally scheduled to take place on April 11, 2020, however it was cancelled due to the COVID-19 pandemic in the United States.
