= Plan 9 (2015 film) =

- Theatrical film poster
- Directed by: John Johnson
- Written by: John Johnson
- Produced by: Rahul Thakkar; John Johnson; Johnny Sullivan; Mikiah Umbertis; David Simmons; John Birmingham
- Starring: Brian Krause; Mr. Lobo; Monique Dupree
- Narrated by: Mr. Lobo
- Cinematography: B. Sweeney
- Edited by: John Johnson; Neil Wagner
- Music by: Lucas Gibbons
- Production company: Darkstone Entertainment
- Distributed by: Gravitas Ventures
- Release date: February 18, 2015 (Australia)
- Running time: 103 minutes
- Country: United States
- Language: English

Plan 9 is a 2015 independent science fiction-comedy horror film written and directed by John Johnson, and is homage, and partial remake of the cult 1957 B-movie Plan 9 from Outer Space (widely considered one of the worst movies of all time). It stars Brian Krause, Mr. Lobo, Monique Dupree and Camille Keaton, with appearances by Internet personalities Aaron Yonda, Matt Sloan, James Rolfe and actor Conrad Brooks, who appeared in the original film and was a member of director Ed Wood's regular acting company. Initially intended for 2008 theatrical release, it was released on DVD and Blu-Ray in Australia and New Zealand in February 2015, and on video on demand in North America approximately one year later.

== Cast ==
- Brian Krause as Jeff Trent
- Mr. Lobo as Criswell
- Matthew Ewald as Jimmy
- Monique Dupree as Becky
- James Rolfe as Officer Cop Policeman
- Aaron Yonda as Toby
- Matt Sloan as Sammy
- John Johnson as Patrolman Kelton
- Camille Keaton as Grandma
- Conrad Brooks as Jamie
- Addy Miller as Sarah
- Chris J. Duncan as Danny
- Sara Eshleman as Lucy Grimm
- Amy B. Donahue as Zombie
- Jacob Baldwin as Zombie (Rear Cover Credit)
- Sid Wood as Ghoul Man

== Reception ==
Screen Anarchy reviewed the film, stating that "Plan 9 can stand on its own as a cheesy B-movie and it goes down well with friends, beer and pizza in tow, in a double bill with its forefather. For a no-budget amateurish production, the original has earned a place in history that actually merits remakes. Ed Wood would definitely approve." Glenn Cochrane of Scream magazine also reviewed Plan 9, writing "PLAN 9 has its moments but they’re few and far between and with an inconsistent pitch and a lacklustre delivery it proves to be a disjointed and uninspiring exploit of a B-movie classic." Dread Central rated the film at 3 1/2 stars, commenting that "There is no point to the existence of Plan 9 other than to make fans of the original Plan 9 from Outer Space smile ear-to-ear in appreciation."
