= David Gere =

Film producer

- Born: David James Gere; February 15, 1975 (age 51); Cromwell, Connecticut
- Occupations: Film producer; actor; artist; business entrepreneur
- Father: James Gere

David Gere (born February 15, 1975) is an American film producer, actor, artist, and business entrepreneur.

== Biography ==
David James Gere was born in Cromwell, Connecticut. His mother and sister were killed in an accident during his childhood. He was subsequently raised by his father, James, an educator, and his stepmother, Veronica Gere. Gere graduated from Cromwell High School and attended Providence College in Rhode Island on academic and track scholarships. In 1996, he signed a modeling contract with Next Model Management NYC. He graduated in 1997 with a Bachelor of Arts in Political Science and a minor in Film Studies. That same year, he was featured in a European print campaign for GUESS Jeans. Gere then pursued interests in acting and filmmaking, working both in front of and behind the camera in short films, documentaries, commercials, and music videos, including those on MTV2.

In business, David got involved with commercial real estate and development in Connecticut. He created small business ventures before returning to the entertainment industry as a film producer and actor. His directorial debut came in 2021. Gere owns bars, nightclubs, restaurants that have been used for filming locations, celebrity appearances and charitable events. Gere was awarded “Top 40 Under 40” by CT Magazine in January 2014, a list of young entrepreneurs and successful business persons.

Gere is known for casting professional wrestlers in his films. This relationship led to legendary professional wrestler Tommy Dreamer suggesting Gere get involved with sports entertainment; at Tommy Dreamer's House of Hardcore 3, Gere debuted as his pro wrestling heel manager persona of DG HAVEN. He is currently active in both the House of Hardcore and the Revival Pro Wrestling promotions.

== Career ==
Gere is best known for his role as Frank Meltzer on the CW Network’s hit show Gossip Girl. Gere has also appeared in television shows and movies, including Ugly Betty, Rocky Balboa, Remains, The Dark Knight Rises, Infected, Self Storage, Army of the Damned, and A Bet. In 2014, Gere co-starred in the thriller, Buddy Hutchins with Jamie Kennedy, Sally Kirkland, and Sara Malakul Lane. The story of the film was highlighted in an Entertainment Tonight piece that aired on February 22, 2014, as the film was produced by the youngest movie producer in history, Richard Switzer, who is Gere's producing partner at Switzer Entertainment Group, LLC. In the summer of 2014, Gere was cast as Tyler Lavey in the teen sex caper, School's Out. The character was loosely based on Gere's real life, as he portrayed a nightclub owner who mentors two high school misfits. Gere is a producing partner at the Woodhaven Production company and has produced various feature films including Sensory Perception, Self Storage, Chilling Visions: The 5 Senses of Fear, Army of the Damned, A Bet's a Bet, The Devil's Dozen, and Almost Mercy.

Gere formed a relationship with the infamous former mobster, Henry Hill after Hill appeared twice at The Shadow Room. Gere became close to Hill, and they were developing a project together in which Gere was to portray Hill. Hill was famously portrayed by Ray Liotta in the award-winning box office hit, Goodfellas, which was directed by Martin Scorsese. Hill died unexpectedly just days after a meeting with Gere. The future of the film is unknown at this time, but Gere has indicated that he has been in contact with Hill's girlfriend, Lisa Caserta, to revive the project.
