= House of Hardcore =

American independent professional wrestling promotion

- Acronym: HOH
- Founded: October 6, 2012
- Defunct: March 14, 2020
- Style: Professional wrestling Hardcore wrestling
- Founder: Tommy Dreamer
- Owner(s): Extreme Original Productions, Inc.
- Predecessor: Extreme Championship Wrestling
- Website: houseofhardcore.net

House of Hardcore (HOH) was an American independent professional wrestling promotion founded by professional wrestler Tommy Dreamer. Its slogan is "No Politics, No BS, Just Wrestling." In its history, HOH has run events in twelve states and three countries. The promotion has remained inactive since March 14, 2020.

== History ==
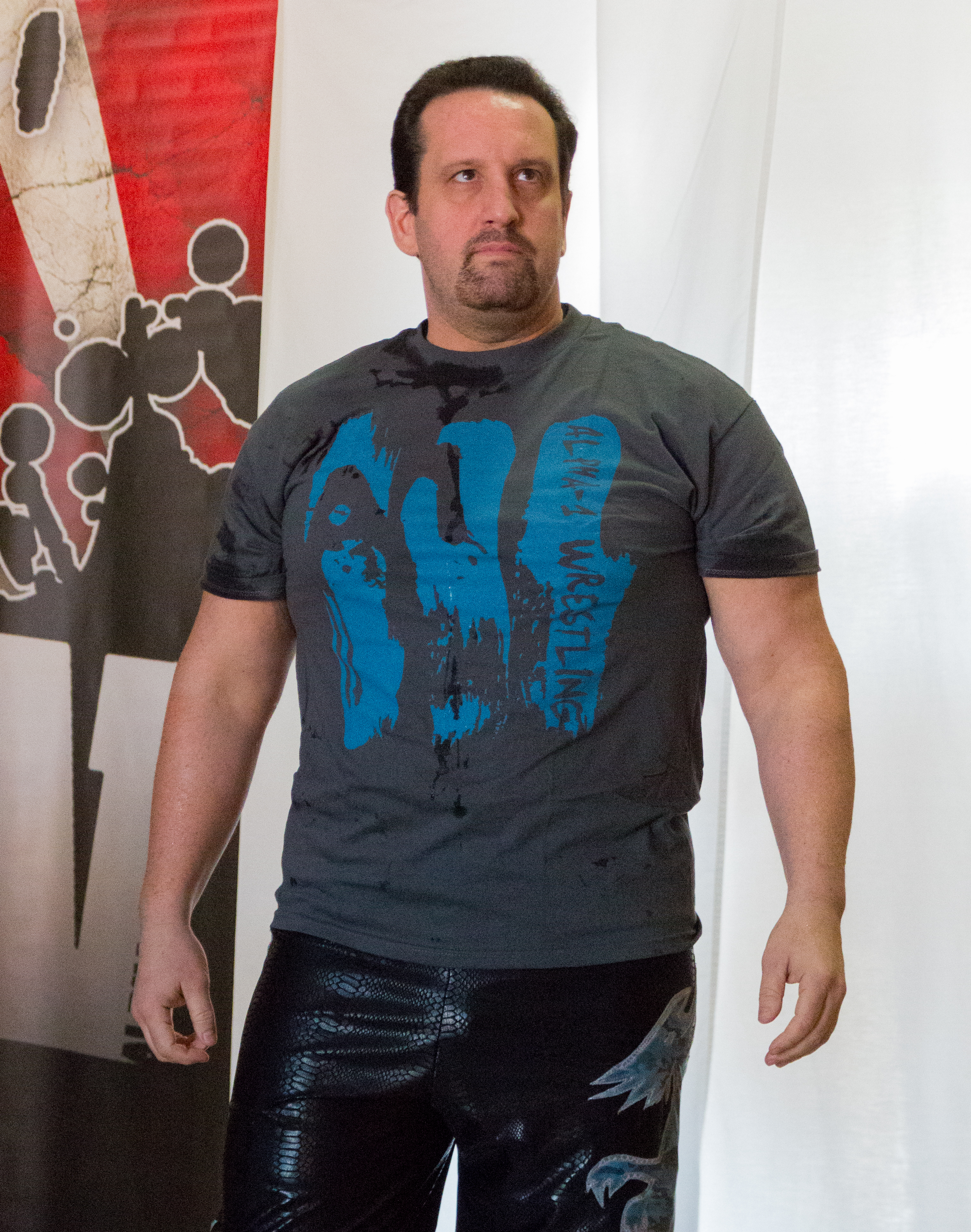
House of Hardcore founder Tommy Dreamer, 2014

On June 21, 2012, professional wrestler Tommy Dreamer began promoting House of Hardcore on his Twitter account. In the weeks afterward, HOH would be revealed to be a wrestling school run by Dreamer, Hale Collins and Vik Dalishus based out of the Mid-Hudson Civic Center in Poughkeepsie, New York that would also run an event on October 6, 2012. Dreamer wanted a promotion with the spirit of ECW, a former promotion where Dreamer worked and House of Hardcore being the name of the ECW training school. With the success of the first show, the promotion would continue to run events, though the wrestling school would cease in 2016 after building issues.

In its history, HOH has worked with Family Wrestling Entertainment, Combat Zone Wrestling, Impact Wrestling, Outback Championship Wrestling, Reality of Wrestling, International Wrestling Cartel, MCW Pro Wrestling, Aussie All Pro, National Wrestling Alliance, Ring of Honor, Overdrive Wrestling and Chinlock Wrestling. At the first event, the FWE Heavyweight Championship, held by Dreamer, was defended against Carlito Colon and Mike Knox. On November 9, 2013, the TNA wrestler Bully Ray made his debut in the company to attack Dreamer and to promote the TNA PPV One Night Only: Old School. The only roster members to appear on all HOH shows are Dreamer and announcer Vic Travagliante until January 2017 when Travagliante joined WWE.

Following the events of House of Hardcore IV where Bully Ray was pulled from the show by Total Nonstop Action Wrestling, Dreamer representing HOH would join with Bully Ray and Devon in their feud with Dixie Carter, Ethan Carter III and associates. The feud ended on the August 7, 2014 episode of Impact Wrestling when Bully Ray put Dixie through a table. After this feud Dreamer would continue to represent HOH in TNA in matches with Bobby Lashley, Team 3D, Magnus, Bram and Eric Young.

On August 7, 2014, the promotion appeared on the TruTV series Impractical Jokers episode "The Lost Boy." Brian "Q" Quinn's punishment for losing, though he was told he joining a musical dressed as Peter Pan, was to fight Dreamer in front of a crowd after insulting them. The appearance was taped on June 6, 2014 at House of Hardcore IV.

On April 13, 2015, HOH announced it would run its first international show to be held in Toronto, Ontario on July 18. Three days later, House of Hardcore announced a global television deal with Fight Network. Starting on May 12, HOH would televise ten one-hour shows featuring highlights from all the House of Hardcore events to date. House of Hardcore on Fight Network would air on Cablevision’s Optimum TV, Grande Communications, Shentel Cable and Armstrong Cable in the U.S., nationwide in Canada, Roku devices across North America, and globally in over 30 countries across Europe, Africa and the Middle East.

The November 30, 2015 episode of WWE Raw would feature the surprise of Dreamer, in HOH attire, returning to WWE to help The Dudley Boyz and Rhyno against The Wyatt Family. Dreamer's brief time with WWE ended in January 2016 since a longer commitment would have forced HOH to close.

June 2016 would feature Dreamer partnering with Outback Championship Wrestling to bring HOH to Australia. With the success of that event, HOH would return to Australia for multiple events in June 2017 and July 2018 with Aussie All Pro.

On November 20, 2016, HOH announced a deal with FloSlam for live streaming of events (starting in December 2016) and On Demand access to some archived events. In March 2017, HOH and FloSlam extended their deal to cover events to May 2017.

On June 5, 2017, House of Hardcore and ProWrestlingTees.com announced that they were teaming up for a promotion called "Summer of Hardcore". With this promotion fans would be able to purchase from 12 former HOH T-shirt designs. The "Summer of Hardcore" runs until September 1. In response to Hurricane Harvey, HOH announced a Labor Day promotion where they would match every order on ProWrestlingTees.com and send shirts to storm victims. The HOH store continues to be open.

On October 8, 2017, Dreamer announced at New York Comic Con a multi-year exclusive partnership with Twitch and HOH. The official live airing of content would be House of Hardcore 35 with content being added weekly. This would see HOH focusing on storylines and the future creation of House of Hardcore championships. In addition, HOH would run more shows including during Wrestlemania weekend.

The first episode of House of Hardcore TV aired on Twitch November 8, 2017. The show, which had no set length, aired on Wednesdays at 9 PM EST. Episodes typically featured hype for future events, recaps of past events and a showcased match from the HOH archive. One of the goals of the show was "telling wrestler's real stories" in part by having them create their own promo segments. Starting with the July 18, 2018 episode, the HOH TV show format would change to Dreamer hosting a live Q&A with some guests and discussing HOH and other topics. In addition, instead of airing live events, starting in May 2018 HOH shows would be shown monthly after having some time for post-production. House of Hardcore 43 would be the last current event shown on Twitch, instead events from the beginning of HOH would be aired featuring Dreamer, Monique Dupree and sometimes other wrestlers chatting along with viewers in Twitch chat. HOH would cease airing events on Twitch in March 2019 and cease the Q&A's in October 2020.

Beginning in January 2018, Dreamer in addition to operating HOH began to work backstage for Impact Wrestling. As a part of this, on April 6th, 2018 Dreamer and HOH helped to produce the Impact Wrestling vs. Lucha Underground special on Twitch and starting with House of Hardcore 40 would feature promos and matches from some HOH events being featured on episodes of Impact!. Dreamer would also become involved in the Eddie Edwards/Sami Callihan feud on Impact! and in a House of Hardcore match (No Disqualification match) at Impact Wrestling Redemption. Eventually Dreamer's involvement in the feud would lead to issues with Edwards where he would turn on Dreamer at House of Hardcore 43 They would resolve their issues in a House of Hardcore match at Slammiversary XVI

After holding tournament matches at House of Hardcore 37 and House of Hardcore 39, HOH would crown its first champion at House of Hardcore 40 when Willie Mack won the HOH Twitch Television Championship. The title has been defended in America, Canada and Australia. On September 6, 2018, the title would be defended in Dragon Gate's Storm Gate at Korakuen Hall in Tokyo, Japan when Mack defeated Shun Skywalker. On December 31, 2018, Mack would successfully defend the title against Tommy Dreamer in Baldwin Park, California for Bar Wrestling.

On August 6, 2018, HOH would announce that it would be at the Keystone Comic Con in Philadelphia which would take place September 14-16, 2018. Throughout the weekend, matches would take place featuring Dreamer, Alex Reynolds, Lance Anoa'i and students from the Team 3D Wrestling Academy. In addition to wrestling, the HOH booth would feature Bully Ray, Monique Dupree and Tyrus appearing at different days of the weekend along with Dreamer and Bully hosting an Extreme Q&A. On August 13, 2019, HOH would announce a return to the Keystone Comic Con which would take place August 23-25, 2019. Throughout the weekend, HOH would have matches and appearances featuring Dreamer, Rhino, Dupree, students from the Team 3D Wrestling Academy and actor Scott Patterson being in Dreamer's corner for a match.

On January 1, 2019, Dreamer partnered with GaS Digital Network to produce the House of Hardcore Podcast. The podcast featured Dreamer interviewing wrestling personalities, telling stories from his career and talking about House of Hardcore and recent events. It also included segments where Dreamer answered listener questions and taste tests different coffees and Oreos. The podcast ran until July 3, 2023 and had 143 episodes.

On March 25, 2019, RetroSoft Studios announced that House of Hardcore, Tommy Dreamer and the HOH Twitch Television Championship would be included in their upcoming game RetroMania Wrestling. The game, which is a spiritual successor to WWF WrestleFest, had already announced Zack Sabre Jr., The Road Warriors and Austin Idol as being a part of the roster. The game was released on Steam (Feb 26, 2021), Xbox One (March 23, 2021), Nintendo Switch (March 30, 2021), PlayStation 4 (April 30, 2021) and iiRcade (June 4, 2021) and would also feature two HOH arenas for matches. The game also includes HOH alumni Johnny Retro, Nick Aldis, Brian Myers, Colt Cabana, Stevie Richards, The Blue Meanie, Jeff Cobb and Referee Ryan T. The NWA Worlds Heavyweight Championship would be featured in the game instead of the HOH Twitch Television Championship.

On May 8, 2019, HOH announced that it was partnering with Impact Wrestling to live stream two events. The June 8 event in Philadelphia, titled "A Night You Can't Mist", was broadcast on Impact Plus and Fite. The June 9 event in St. James, New York, titled "Digital Destruction", was broadcast on Impact Wrestling's Twitch channel.

The April 11, 2020 HOH 58 event at the 2300 Arena in Philadelphia was cancelled on March 14 due to the Coronavirus. House of Hardcore has not held any events since the Coronavirus pandemic restrictions ended.

== List of events and results ==
House of Hardcore has produced 57 chronological events in additional to 2 charity events. The first event took place on October 6, 2012 in Poughkeepsie, New York at the Mid-Hudson Civic Center. The 2300 Arena in Philadelphia, Pennsylvania has held the most events with fifteen.

== Championships ==
Championship	Champion	Previous	Date won	Days	Location	Defenses
HOH Twitch Television Championship	Willie Mack		April 7, 2018	707	New Orleans, Louisiana	13

== Title history ==
=== HOH Twitch Television Championship ===
As of August 7, 2026.

Key
No.	Overall reign number
Reign	Reign number for the specific champion
Days	Number of days held
Defenses	Number of successful defenses
+	Current reign is changing daily

No.	Champion	Championship change			Reign statistics			Notes	Ref.
No.	Champion	Date	Event	Location	Reign	Days	Defenses	Notes	Ref.
1	Willie Mack	April 7, 2018	HOH 40	New Orleans, Louisiana	1	707	13	This was a triple threat match also involving Sami Callihan and Alex Reynolds.	
