= Monique Dupree =

American actress

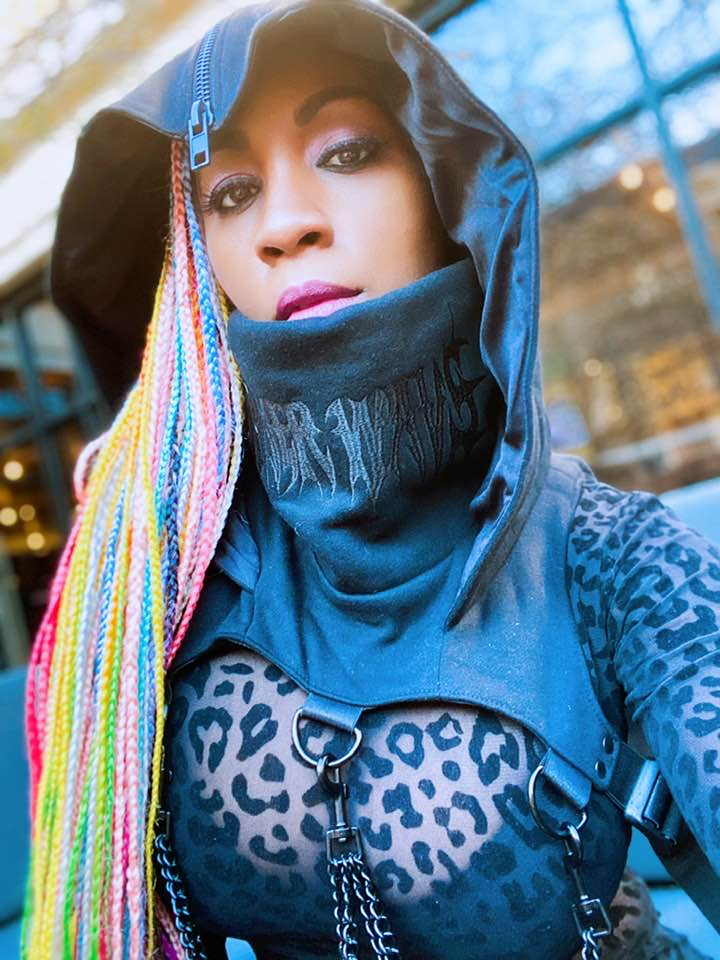
- Dupree in 2020
- Born: December 10, 1974 (age 51); Newark, New Jersey
- Occupations: Actress; wrestling valet; Singer; Burlesque performer
- Years active: 1984–present
- Spouse: Anthony Saint Thomas
- Children: 10
- Relatives: Tony Todd (brother)
- Website: moniquedupree.com

Monique Dupree (born December 10, 1974), also known as "Tha True Original GATA", is an American actress, wrestling valet, singer and burlesque performer. She also worked in production and social media management for Tommy Dreamer's House of Hardcore promotion. Dreamer has dubbed Dupree "The Heart and Soul of House of Hardcore" on numerous occasions during the promotion's Twitch streams. She has also appeared as a valet for Impact Wrestling.

== Personal life ==
Dupree was born in Newark, New Jersey. Her older brother is actor Tony Todd. She was married to author Anthony Saint Thomas, the couple had ten children together. Dupree is in a relationship with professional wrestler Tommy Dreamer.

== Career ==
Dupree's early film appearances included Lean on Me (1989), The Replacements (2000), Pot Zombies (2005), American Gangster, One Night and The Ten (all 2007). In November 2007, Dupree appeared alongside Warrington Gillette as a guest on the horror podcast Without Your Head. In 2008, she appeared in Super Tromette Action Movie Go! and played Emerald in Bachelor Party in the Bungalow of the Damned.

She has also worked as a model and appeared in magazines including The Autograph Collector Magazine and Primera Linea. In 2011, Vice reported that she had twice been featured as a "Tromette" for Troma Entertainment, and described her as "the original black scream queen". She also worked as a comic-book model, portraying the character Edie Van Horne in Gingerstein: Rise of the Undead. As a musician, Dupree was the lead singer of the band Negro Childe.

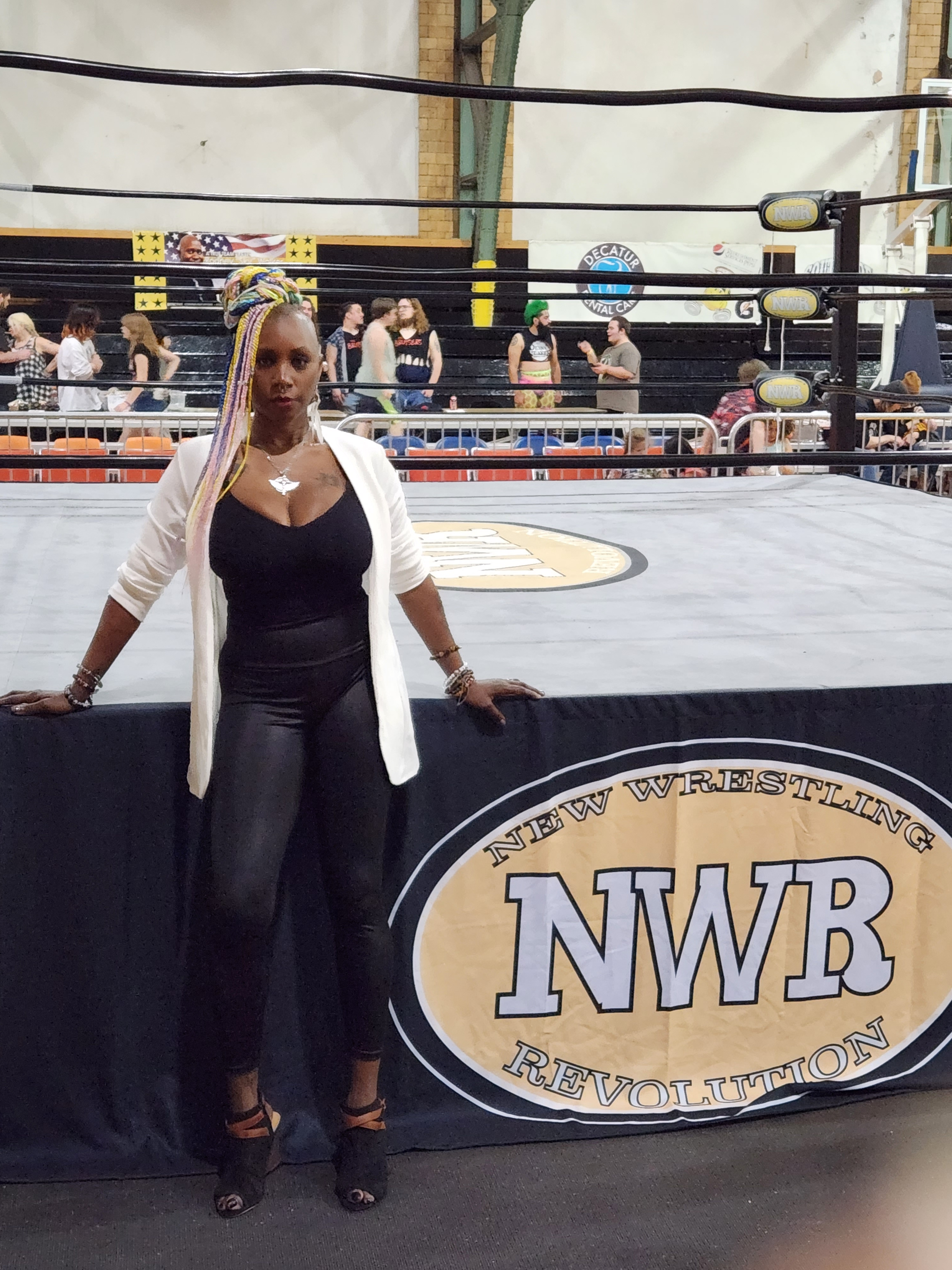
Dupree at NWR event, 2023

Between 2013 and 2019, she worked as a wrestling valet for House of Hardcore, appearing alongside Monet Dupree as part of the Double Duprees. She also contributed to the promotion's production and social media management. In 2015, Dupree directed and appeared in the short horror film Shadowhunters: Devilspeak. She also appeared as a shower girl in Return to Return to Nuke 'Em High AKA Volume 2 (2017). In 2019, Dupree said she was developing a reality-style YouTube series titled GATA Speaks, with a pilot featuring Tommy Dreamer, Al Snow and Mick Foley.

Dupree later played Caliban in Lloyd Kaufman's film Shakespeare's Shitstorm (2020). Her burlesque performances have included appearances with Tippitywitchet Productions, and in 2022, she returned to performing burlesque in Baltimore. In 2024, Dupree appeared as Kat in The Mick and the Trick. As of 2026, she was listed as appearing in two unreleased films, Now That's Love, as Bella, and Ill, as a radio DJ named Hope.

== Filmography ==
=== Film ===
Year	Title	Role	Ref.
2008	Deadlands 2: Trapped	Associate producer	
2008	Skeleton Key 2: 667 Neighbor of the Beast	Posh	
2008	Zombthology	Busty Jogger	
2008	Bachelor Party in the Bungalow of the Damned	Emerald	
2009	Bikini Bloodbath Christmas	Dungaree	
2009	Caged Lesbos A-Go-Go	Demme	
2009	Handsome Harry	Bar Patron	
2009	Timo Rose's Beast	Monique	
2009	Cottonmouth (Short Film)	The Bloated Ghost	
2009	Heavy Mental: A Rock-N-Roll Blood Bath	Self / New Mrs. Delicious	
2009	The Superagent	Bar Patron	
2010	Welcome to My Darkside! (Documentary)	Self	
2010	The Good Parts (Short Film)	Jennifer	
2010	The Lovecraft Chronicles: Dumas (Short Film)	Vampire Bride	
2010	Step Up 3D	Hip Hop Girl	
2010	The Horror Vault 3	Missing Girl	
2010	Satan Hates You	Succubus	
2010	For Christ's Sake	Jackie Angel	
2010	Play Dead (Short Film)	Black Mona	
2010	Spirit	Pastor Sophia	
2011	Skeleton Key 3: The Organ Trail	Posh	
2011	Brooklyn Brothers Beat the Best	Indy Hillbilly #3	
2011	Hunting Chupacabra (Short Film)	Ike Chow	
2011	The Trouble with Bliss	Customer	
2011	The Fixer: The Power of Balance	Monique	
2011	Shadowhunters: Lost (Short Film)	Lania	
2012	All Wifed Out	Pedestrian	
2012	The Creightonville Terror	Chainsaw Melody	
2012	Little Big Boy	Jenny	
2012	No Strings 2: Playtime in Hell	Pam	
2013	Post Mortem, America 2021	Rose	
2013	Dead Woman's Hollow	Waitress	
2013	Sheriff Tom vs. The Zombies	Zombie Slayer	
2015	Shadowhunters: Devilspeak	Lania (also director)	
2015	The Perfect Letter	Natalie	
2015	Caesar and Otto's Paranormal Halloween	Flexy	
2015	Croatoan: Origins (Short film)	Sally (also executive producer)	
2015	Plan 9	Becky	
2016	Sex, Blood and Fairy Tales	Meriya	
2017	Sickness	Hope, The Radio DJ	
2017	Skeleton Key 3 Part 2	Posh	
2017	Return to Return to Nuke 'Em High AKA Volume 2	Shower Girl	
2017	Rednecks	Pool Wrestling Girl	
2017	The Spook Detail: The Case of the Witches Three (Short film)	Vance	
2019	Tiny's October 31st (Short film)	Protester	
2019	Headstrong (Documentary)	Herself	
2020	Death Care	Beatrice Jones	
2020	Good Girl Lola	Alien Goddess	
2020	The Fright Before Christmas	Miss Cleo	
2020	Shakespeare Shitstorm	Caliban	
2020	Remnants	Remy	
2020	Killer Waves 2	Aerial Finny	
2022	Witch Trials	Kat	
2023	The Beautiful Ones	Shea Benjamin	
2024	The Mick and the Trick	Kat	

=== Television ===
Year	Title	Role	Note	Ref.
2001	Say What? Karaoke	Herself	Episode dated: January 2	
2006	Fuse Fangoria Chainsaw Awards	Herself	Television special	
2007	Pants-Off Dance-Off	Herself	Contestant	
2007	Life Support	Family Member	Television film	
2008	Law & Order	Socialite	Episode: "Sweetie" (season 19, episode 6)	
2008	The Tyra Banks Show	Herself	Episode dated: January 9	
2009	Z Rock	Rock Chick	Episode: "Z-united" (season 2, episode 1)	
2010	Royal Pains	Hampton Mother	Episode: "The Hankover" (season 2, episode 8)	
2010	Spade	Tanya	Episode: "Do or Die Time" (season 1, episode 12)	
2011	The Culinary Adventures of Baron Ambrosia	Tha Original Gata	Credited as Monique "Gata" Dupree	
2014	The Jimmy Star Show with Ron Russell	Herself	Guest alongside Angelique Morgan	
2015	Impractical Jokers	Herself	Episode: "The Dream Crusher"	

=== Wrestling ===
Year	Event	Role	Ref.
2023	NWR: Solar Charge	Commissioner	
2023	NWR: All Star Glory	Commissioner	
2023	NWR: Rise of the Vixens	Co-Commissioner	
2023	NWR: Reign of the Kaiju	Commissioner	
2023	New Wrestling Revolution: Attack of the Kaiju	Special Guest	

=== Burlesque performances ===
Date	Performance	Venue/organizer	Ref.
April 27, 2023	Working Blue	Crazy Aunt Helen's, Washington D.C.	
June 24, 2023	Such Sights: A Tribute to Body Horror Through Bawdy Humor	Coney Island USA, Brooklyn, New York	
July 22, 2023	DC Braulesque: Shiver Me Tassels: The Sea-Quel (1 Year Anniversary Show)	DC Brau, Washington, D.C.	
July 27 & 29, 2023	The Hen House Show	The Port Comedy Club	
February 27, 2025	Hen House: A Drag, Stand Up & Burlesque Show	Tattooed Mom, Philadelphia	
