= Niagara Falls Convention Centre =

Canadian convention venue

Coordinates: 43°04′34.7″N 79°05′5.6″W

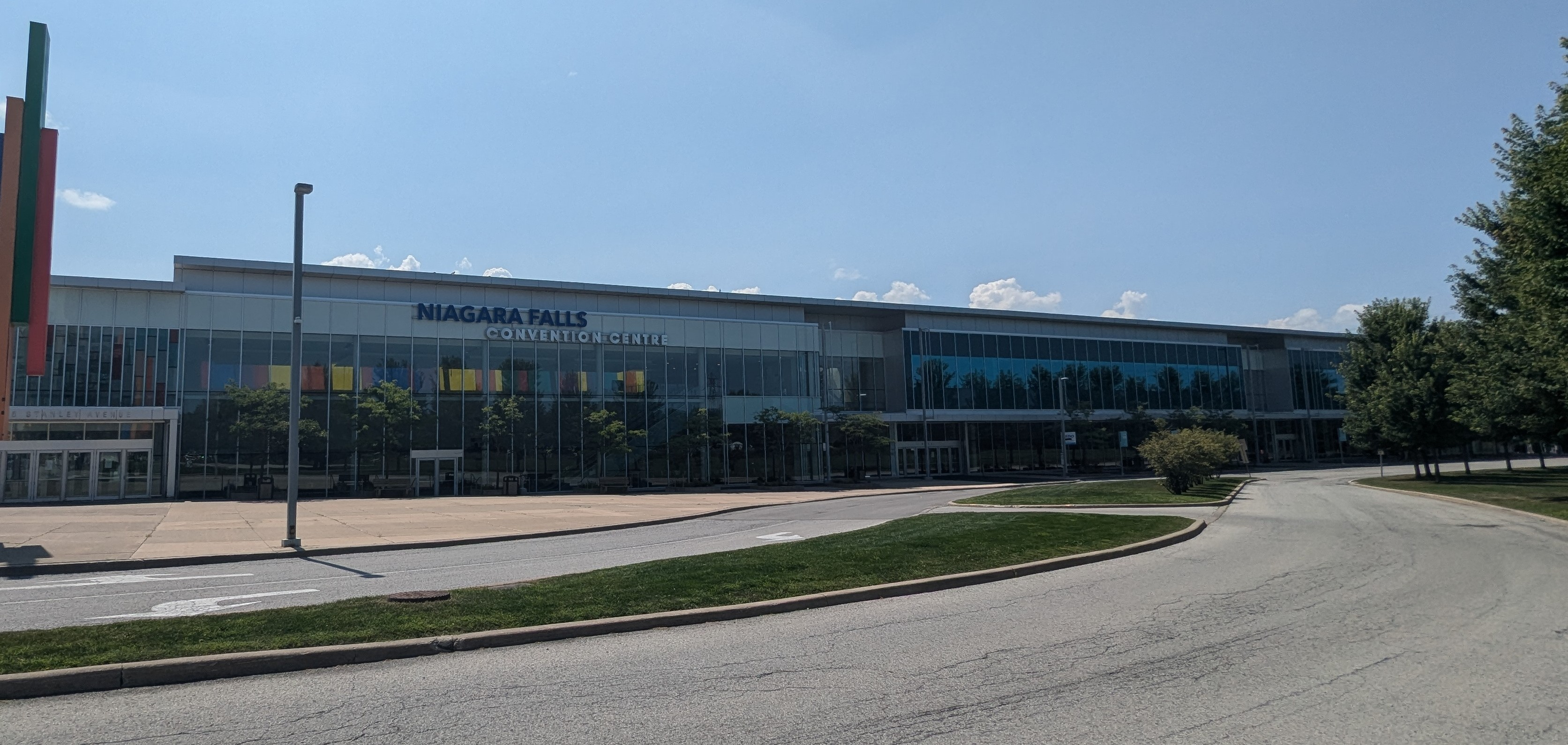
- Niagara Falls Convention Centre in 2024
- Interactive map of Niagara Falls Convention Centre
- Address: 6815 Stanley Avenue; Niagara Falls, Ontario; L2G 3Y9
- Owner: Non-Profit
- Public transit: WEGO Niagara Falls Visitor Transportation

Construction
- Built: 2009-2011
- Opened: April 2011
- Renovated: 2018
- Construction cost: $100 million CAD

Website
- www.fallsconventions.com

The Niagara Falls Convention Centre is a convention centre located in Niagara Falls, Ontario, Canada, along Stanley Avenue and Dunn Street. It was previously known as the Scotiabank Convention Centre from 2011 to 2021 and was renamed after Scotiabank's naming rights expired.

== History ==
In 2007, a public-private partnership was formed to fund the project. Both the federal and provincial governments contributed $35 million each and the remaining one-third commitment came from private investors. The Regional Municipality of Niagara provided the lease of land on which the facility was built for a nominal fee of $1 per year. Construction on the two-storey building began on May 1, 2009. The halfway point of construction was marked by a ceremony on April 30, 2010. In 2015, a president for the convention centre was hired. It was renamed the Niagara Falls Convention Centre in 2021 when Scotiabank's naming rights expired. In 2022, the centre successfully underwent a certification process that marked it as being accessible to individuals with sensory issues.

The convention centre often hosts large events that attract tourists from outside the city. Some examples of hosted events include the Canadian Cheer National Championships, the Niagara Falls Comic Con, and the 420 Expo. The building has also been used as a film set location. The convention centre was impacted by the COVID-19 pandemic in Ontario, as tourism to Niagara Falls dwindled and government restrictions were made on building capacity. It was used as a mass vaccination site during the pandemic.

In 2024, the venue was used for an event hosted by the Ford government. Thousands of people stood outside the building to protest various policies. In particular, his policies surrounding healthcare funding (leading to the closure of a hospital in Fort Erie) and education funding were criticized. The protests lasted for two days, which was the duration of the event held at the convention centre.

== See also ==
- Scotiabank Arena
- Scotiabank Saddledome
- Meridian Centre – located in nearby St. Catharines
