= SB Kento =

Japanese professional wrestler

SB KENTo
Personal information
- Born: February 6, 2000 (age 26) Nagoya, Japan

Professional wrestling career
- Ring name(s): Kento Kobune; Kento; SB KENTo; SBK
- Billed height: 170 cm (5 ft 7 in)
- Billed weight: 81 kg (179 lb)
- Debut: 2019

Kento Kobune (小船健人, Kobune Kento), better known by his ring name SB KENTo, is a Japanese professional wrestler currently working for both Japanese promotion GLEAT and Mexican promotion Lucha Libre AAA Worldwide (AAA). He is a member of the Tokyo Bad Boys stable. He also makes appearances on the independent circuit. He is best known for his tenure in Dragongate. He was a former Open the Brave Gate Champion and Open the Twin Gate Champion.

== Professional wrestling career ==
=== Dragongate (2019–2023) ===
Kobune made his professional wrestling debut at Dragongate PRIME ZONE Vol. 76 on April 16, 2019, where he went into a time-limit draw against Taketo Kamei in an exhibition match. He made his first appearance in an official match hosted by the promotion at Fantastic Gate 2019 on December 22 where he teamed up with Naruki Doi to defeat Taketo Kamei and Yamato.

At the DG Truth Gate 2021 on February 26, Kobune participated in a 12-man Royal Sambo battle royal also involving the winner Stalker Ichikawa, Super Shisa, Yasushi Kanda, Yosuke Santa Maria and others. On the evening show of the eleventh night of the 2021 Open The New Year Gate on January 31, he teamed up with fellow R.E.D. stablemates BxB Hulk, Kaito Ishida and HipHop Kikuta to defeat Masquerade (Jason Lee, Kota Minoura, La Estrella and Shun Skywalker) in an eight-man tag team match. At The Gate Of Adventure 2021 on August 8, Kobune defeated Kagetora to win the Open the Brave Gate Championship.

Kobune is known for his work towards various signature events of the promotion. One of them is the Gate of Destiny, making his first appearance at the 2020 edition on November 3, where he teamed up with Madoka Kikuta and Taketo Kamei to defeat Team Toryumon (Masato Yoshino, Último Dragón and Yasushi Kanda) in a six-man tag team match. Kobune won the Open the Triangle Gate Championship by teaming up with Kazma Sakamoto and Takashi Yoshida the same night as they defeated Naruki Doi, Punch Tominaga and Ryotsu Shimizu to win the vacant titles. It was later revealed that Kobune, Sakamoto and Yoshida have joined the R.E.D. stable and went as a sub-group ever since.

Another event in which he participated was the King of Gate 2021 where he placed himself in the Block B which he won by scoring a total of six points after competing against Dragon Kid, Eita, Jason Lee, Susumu Yokosuka and Kzy. He then fell short to Kzy in the semi-finals after the latter won a second chance battle royal.

Following a suspected breach of contract, Kobune and fellow rookie Takuma Fujiwara were terminated from their Dragongate contracts "with their consent". There were, according to the statement as written by Dragongate management, unsuccessful efforts to "find a mutually satisfactory path" towards resolving the conflict.

=== All Elite Wrestling (2022) ===
Kento was also made his debut in All Elite Wrestling at AEW Dark #169 on October 21, 2022, where he teamed up with La Estrella in a losing effort against Dante Martin and Matt Sydal.

== Championships and accomplishments ==
- Dragongate
  - Open the Brave Gate Championship (2 times)
  - Open the Twin Gate Championship (1 time) – with H.Y.O
  - Open the Triangle Gate Championship (1 time) – with Kazma Sakamoto and Takashi Yoshida
- Gleat
  - G-Infinity Championship (1 time) – with Takuma
- Pro Wrestling Illustrated
  - Ranked No. 145 of the top 500 singles wrestlers in the PWI 500 in 2022

=== Luchas de Apuestas record ===
Winner (wager)	Loser (wager)	Location	Event	Date	Notes
Dragon Kid (mask)	S. B. Kento (hair)	Aichi, Japan	Dead or Alive 2021	May 5, 2021	(Note: Parejas Suicidas steel cage match, where Kento teamed with Dragon Kid and lost to Yamato and Kai; as the losing team, they faced off in a singles match with mask and hair on the line.)
