= Jason Lee (wrestler) =

Hong Kong professional wrestler

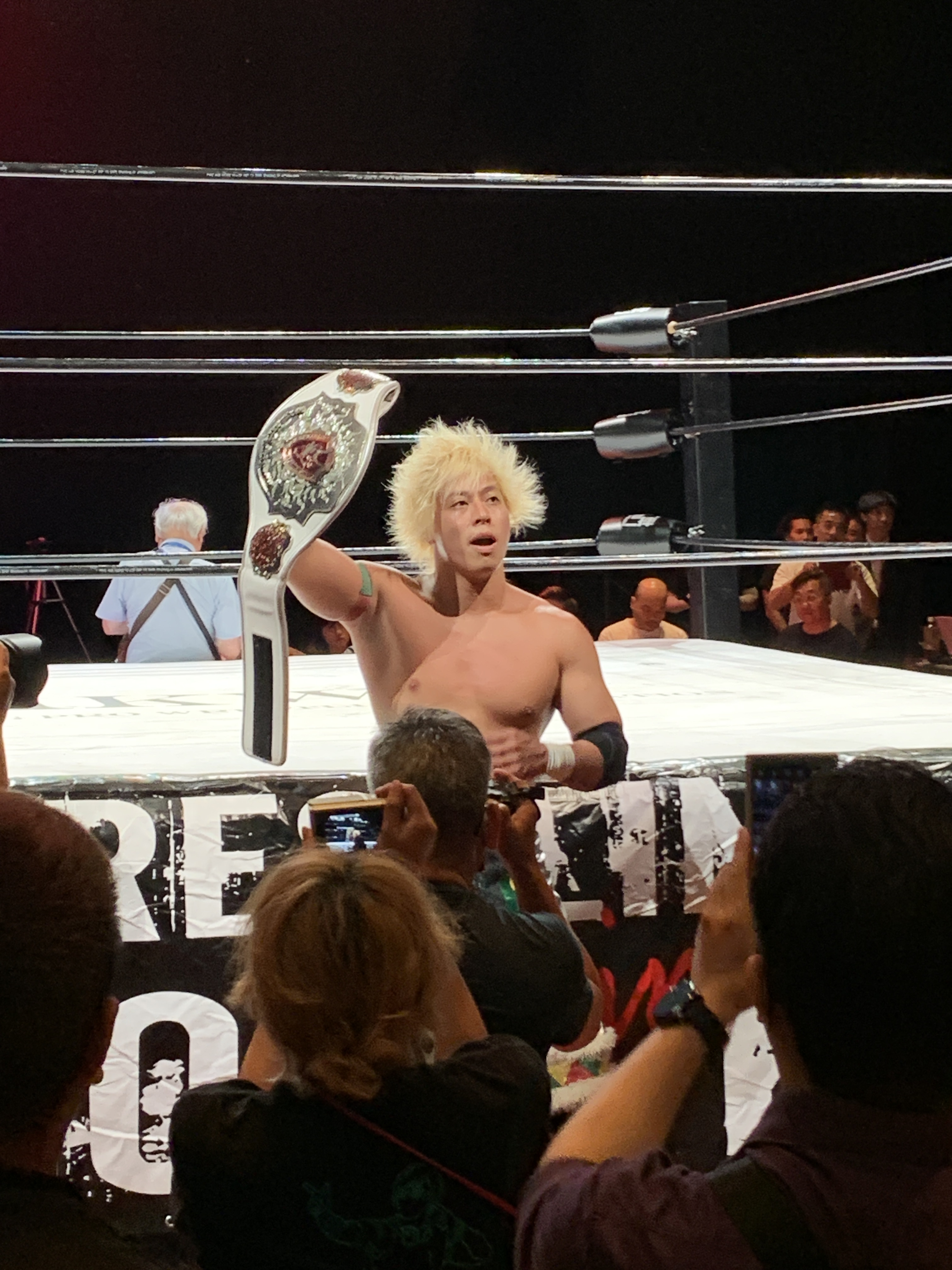
- Lee in June 2023

Personal information
- Born: October 18, 1992 (age 33) Hong Kong

Professional wrestling career
- Ring name(s): Jason New; Jason Lee
- Billed height: 172 cm (5 ft 8 in)
- Billed weight: 72 kg (159 lb)
- Trained by: Shinjiro Otani; Masato Tanaka; Ikuto Hidaka
- Debut: 2009

Liáo Gōng-lín (Chinese: 寥公鱗), better known by the ring-name Jason Lee (Japanese: ジェイソン・リー, Hepburn: Jeison Rī), is a Hong Kong professional wrestler currently working for the Japanese promotion Dragongate.

== Professional wrestling career ==
=== Independent circuit (2009–present) ===
Lee made his professional wrestling debut in June 2009. However, the first recorded performance of his was at HKWF Challenge 2011, an event promoted by the Hong Kong Pro Wrestling Federation on October 23, 2011, where he defeated Bitman to retain the AWGC Junior Heavyweight Championship.

=== Pro Wrestling Zero1 (2012–2015) ===
Lee made his debut for the promotion on the tenth night of the 2012 Fire Festival from August 4, where he teamed up with Robbie Eagles and James Raideen, picking up a victory over Joe Coffey, Johnny Vandal and Tomoaki Honma. He soon began pursuing various titles sanctioned by the promotion such as the NWA International Lightweight Tag Team Championship, title for which he fought alongside Craig Classic in a losing effort against Shawn Guinness and Frank David at ZERO1 World on October 16, 2012. At Zero1 Thirteen on March 9, 2014, Lee defeated Hub to win the Zero1 World Junior Heavyweight Championship and subsequently the Zero1 International Junior Heavyweight Championship which was also contested for. Lee won the titles on one more occasion, at Winter Fever 4 on December 28, 2014, where he defeated Takuya Sugawara for them.

Lee is known for competing in the promotion's signature events such as the Furinkazan tournament, making hid first appearance at the 2013 edition where he teamed up with Choun Shiryu to defeat Daichi Hashimoto and Mineo Fujita in the first rounds, and fell short to Daisuke Sekimoto and Yuji Okabayashi in the second rounds.

=== WWE (2016) ===
Lee briefly competed in WWE's Cruiserweight Classic, a tournament to crown the inaugural WWE Cruiserweight Championship, falling short to Rich Swann in the first rounds of the competition which took place on June 23, 2016.

=== Dragon Gate (2017–present) ===
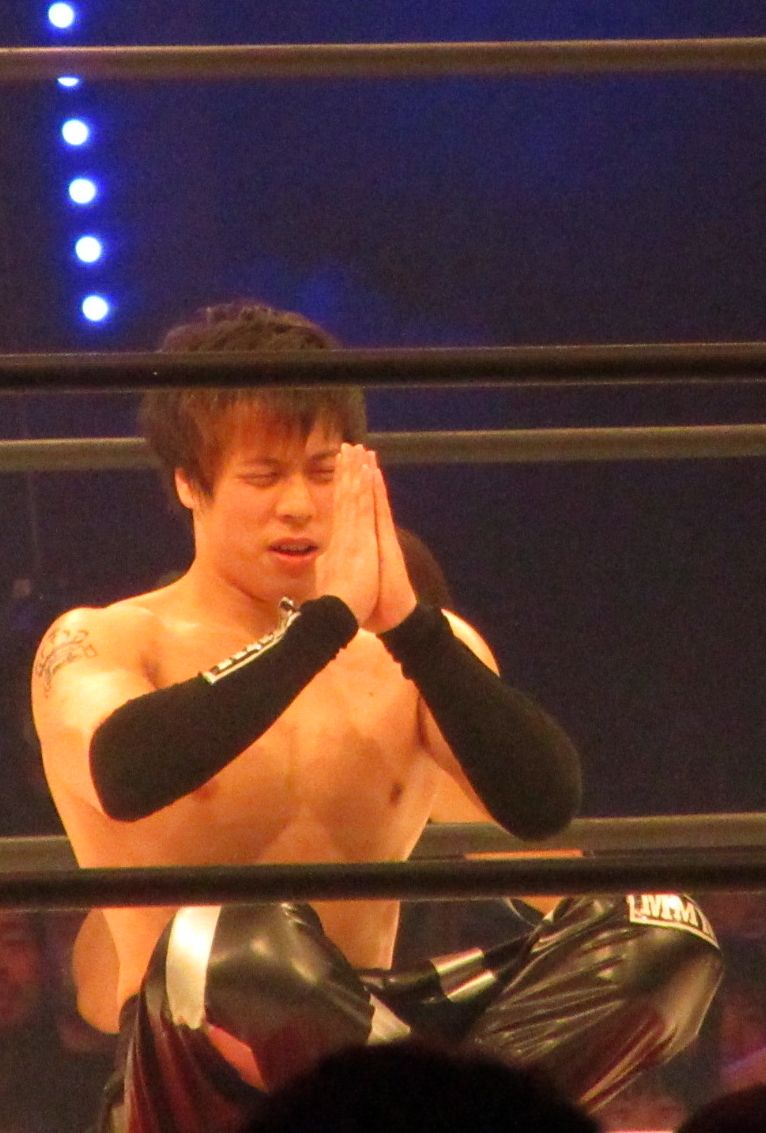
Lee in November 2017

Lee made his debut in Dragon Gate in a dark match which took place on the twenty-second night of the Dragon Gate Scandal Gate from September 13, 2017, where he defeated Shun Skywalker.

He is known for competing in the promotion's signature events and pay-per-views. One of them is the King of Gate, making his first appearance at the 2018 edition of the event where he placed himself in the Block B, where he scored a total of four points after competing against Takashi Yoshida, BxB Hulk, Genki Horiguchi and Big R Shimizu. At the 2019 edition, Lee placed in the Block D, where he scored a total of four points after going against Kai, Shun Skywalker, Big R Shimizu, Dragon Kid and Masaaki Mochizuki. At the 2020 edition, he fell short to Kaito Ishida in the first rounds. At the 2021 edition, he competed in the Block B against SB Kento, Dragon Kid, Eita, Susumu Yokosuka and Kzy, scoring a total of five points. At the 2022 edition he fell short to Ben-K in the first rounds from May 11.

Another signature event in which he competed is the Gate of Destiny, making his first appearance at the 2017 edition from November 3, where he teamed up with Over Generation (Gamma, Kaito Ishida and Mondai Ryu) in a losing effort against K-ness, Misterioso Jr., Shachihoko Boy and Yosuke Santa Maria. Lee was part of the MaxiMuM stable and teamed up with his stablemates Kaito Ishida and Naruki Doi and the Mochizuki Dojo (Masaaki Mochizuki, Shun Skywalker and Yuki Yoshioka) in a losing effort against Natural Vibes (Genki Horiguchi, Kzy and Susumu Yokosuka) for the Open the Triangle Gate Championship one year later at the 2018 edition of the Gate of Destiny. At the 2019 event, he competed again for the Open the Triangle Gate Championship alongside hi stablemates Dragon Kid and Naruki Doi, coming up short again against Strong Machine F, Strong Machine G and Strong Machine J. At the 2021 edition, Lee won a nine-person battle royal also involving Ho Ho Lun, Yosuke Santa Maria, Strong Machine J, Mondai Ryu, Super Shisa, Punch Tominaga, Konomama Ichikawa and Shachihoko Boy.

== Championships and accomplishments ==
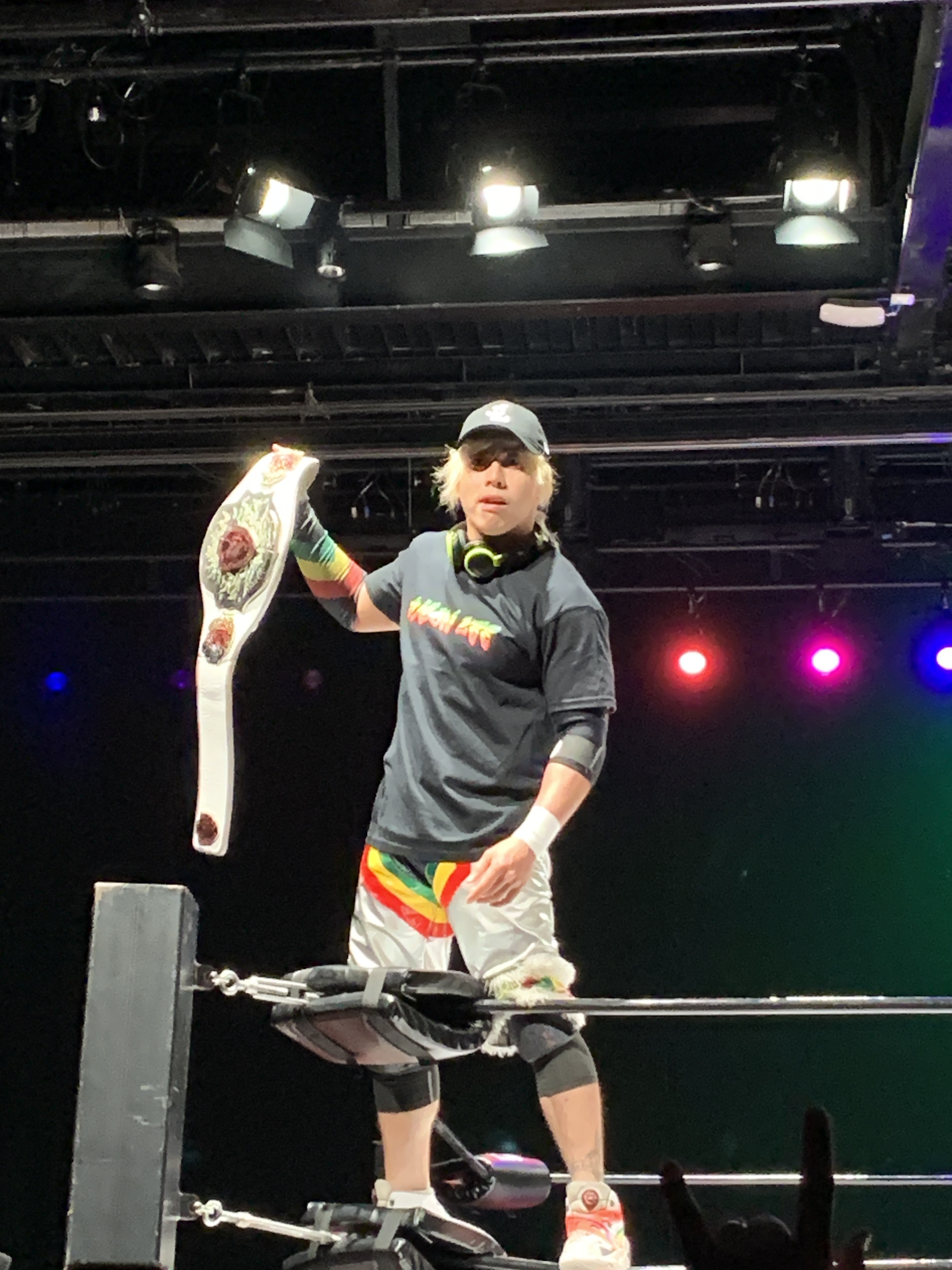
Lee is former Open the Brave Gate Champion.

- Dragon Gate
  - Open the Brave Gate Championship (1 time)
  - Open the Twin Gate Championship (3 times) – with Kota Minoura (2) and Jacky "Funky" Kamei (1)
  - Open the Triangle Gate Championship (3 times) – with Masato Yoshino and Naruki Doi (1), Dragon Dia and La Estrella (1), and Shun Skywalker and Kota Minoura (1)
- Hong Kong Pro Wrestling Federation
  - AWGC Junior Heavyweight Championship (1 time)
- Pro Wrestling Illustrated
  - Ranked No. 369 of the top 500 singles wrestlers in the PWI 500 in 2016
- Pro Wrestling Zero1
  - Zero1 World Junior Heavyweight Championship (2 times)
  - Zero1 International Junior Heavyweight Championship (2 times)
