= Kota Minoura =

Japanese professional wrestler

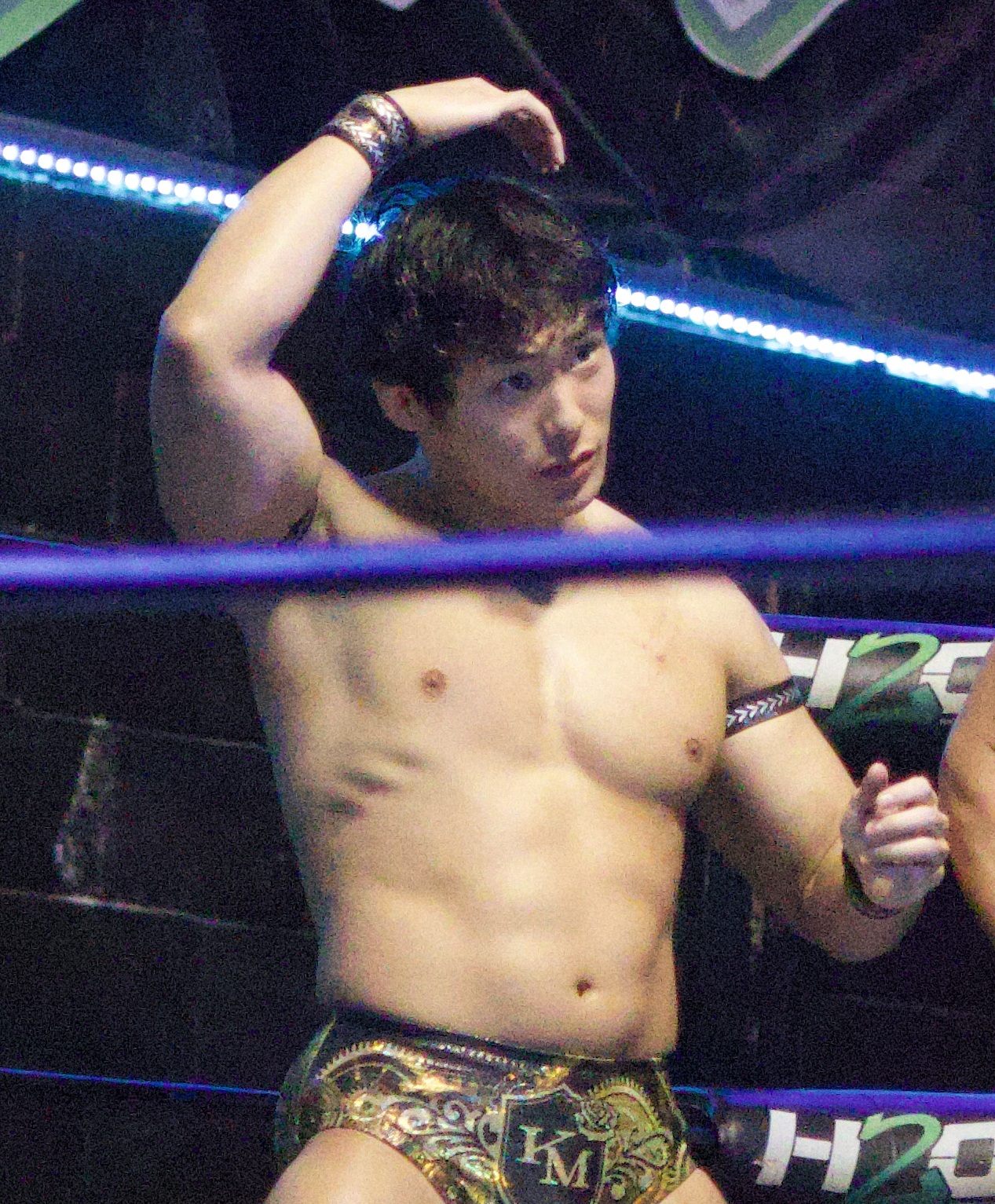
- Minoura in April 2024

Personal information
- Born: December 30, 1998 (age 27) Hashima, Gifu, Japan

Professional wrestling career
- Ring name: Kota Minoura
- Billed height: 177 cm (5 ft 10 in)
- Billed weight: 88 kg (194 lb)
- Trained by: Masato Yoshino
- Debut: 2018

Kota Minoura (箕浦康太, Minoura Kōta) is a Japanese professional wrestler currently working for the Japanese promotion Dragon Gate where he is a former Open the Twin Gate Champion and Open the Triangle Gate Champion.

== Professional wrestling career ==
=== Dragon Gate (2018–present) ===
Minoura made his professional wrestling debut in Dragon Gate on June 11, 2018, on the eleventh night of the Rainbow Gate 2018 where he teamed up with Natural Vibes (Punch Tominaga and Yasshi) in a losing effort against MaxiMuM (Ben-K, Jason Lee and Masato Yoshino) as a result of a six-man tag team match. Being mainly a tag team wrestler, Minoura began chasing various tag titles, and won his first one, the Open the Twin Gate Championship alongside his "Team Dragon Gate" tag partner Jason Lee at Memorial Gate In Wakayama on August 2, 2020, by defeating R.E.D. (BxB Hulk and Kazma Sakamoto). He joined his first faction, the now-defunct stable of "Masquerade" where he succeeded in winning Open the Triangle Gate Championship for the first time in his career by teaming up with stablemates Jason Lee and Shun Skywalker and defeating R.E.D. (Eita, Kaito Ishida and H.Y.O) at Fantastic Gate 2021 of January 12. Minoura switched factions at the beginning of 2022 by joining the newly created unit of "Gold Class", succeeding in winning the triangle titles for the second time, alongside Naruki Doi and Kaito Ishida by defeating Natural Vibes (Kzy, U-T and Jacky Kamei) at Champion Gate in Osaka on March 5.

Minoura is known for competing in various of the promotion's signature events, such as the King of Gate tournament, making first appearance at the 2021 edition where he won the "A Block" with a total of ten points after competing against BxB Hulk, Diamante, Takashi Yoshida, Naruki Doi and Ben-K. He then moved to the semifinals where he defeated Yamato but unfortunately fell short to Kzy in the finals from June 3. Next year at the 2022 edition, Minoura made it to the finals again where he fell short to Yuki Yoshioka.

Minoura preponderantly competed in the Gate of Destiny series of pay-per-views, which is considered to be the promotion's top yearly event. He made his first appearance at the 2018 edition of the event where he teamed up with Tribe Vanguard (Kagetora, U-T and Yosuke Santa Maria) in a losing effort against Daga and R.E.D. (Eita, Kazma Sakamoto and Yasushi Kanda).

=== Independent circuit (2018–present) ===
Minoura rarely competed for several promotions from the Japanese independent scene. One of them was the NPH Legacy II, an independent event produced on October 10, 2022, where he teamed up with Kento Miyahara and Shiro Koshinaka to defeat Hideki Suzuki, Madoka Kikuta and Yuma Aoyagi. He once competed in an event produced by All Japan Pro Wrestling on December 17, 2019, the AJPW AJP Prime Night where he teamed up with Tribe Vanguard (Kai, Yamato and Yosuke Santa Maria) to defeat Hokuto Omori, Jake Lee, Koji Iwamoto and Naoya Nomura.

== Championships and accomplishments ==
- Dragon Gate
  - Open the Twin Gate Championship (2 times) – with Jason Lee
  - Open the Triangle Gate Championship (5 times, current) – with Shun Skywalker and Jason Lee (1), Kaito Ishida and Naruki Doi (1), Ben-K and BxB Hulk (1), Naruki Doi and Minorita (1), and El Cielo and Riiita (1)
  - King of Gate (2023)
- Pro Wrestling Illustrated
  - Ranked Minoura No. 82 of the top 100 tag teams in the PWI Tag Team 100 of 2023 with Ben-K and BxB Hulk
