= Jacky Kamei =

Japanese professional wrestler

Jacky "Funky" Kamei
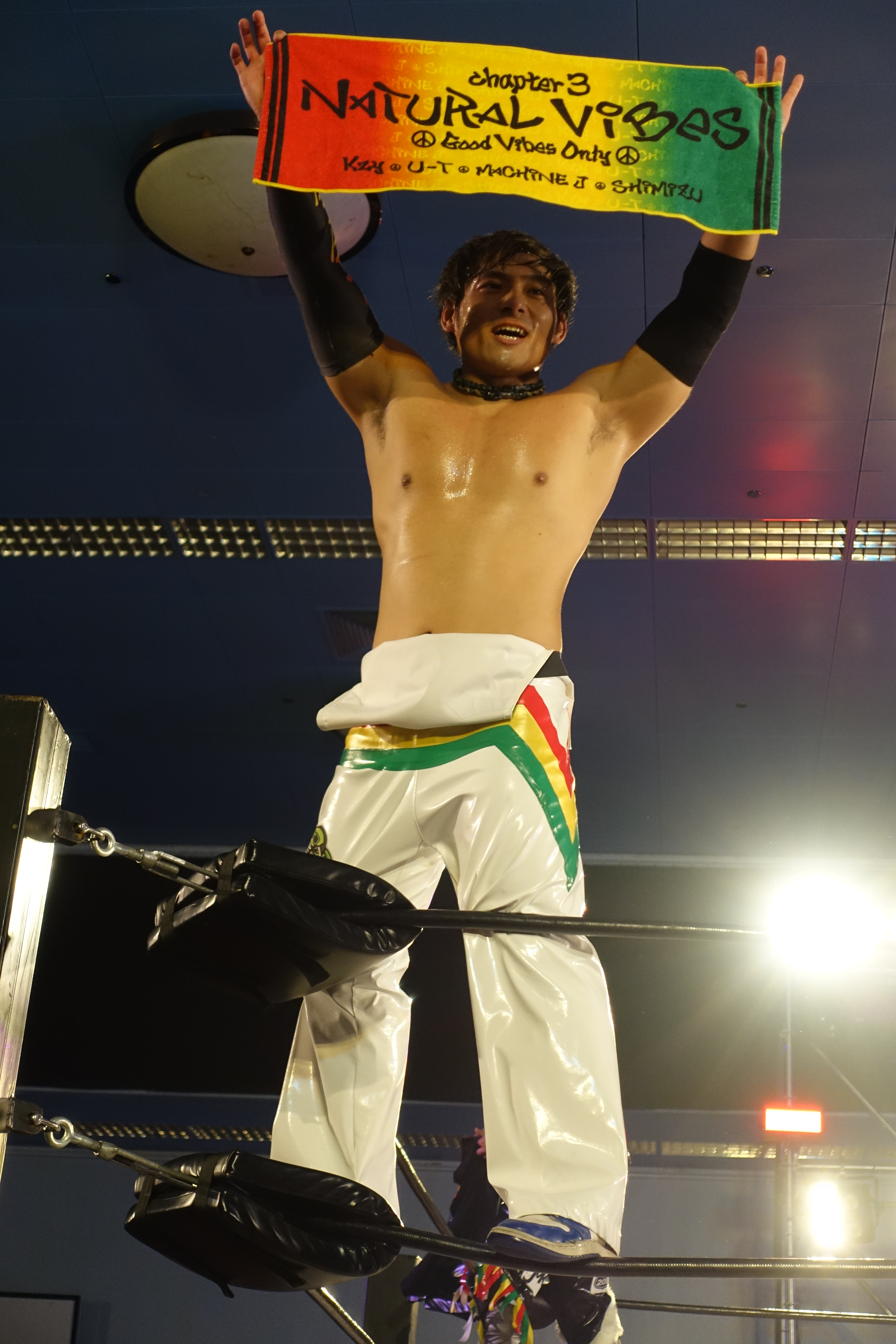
- Kamei in 2023

Personal information
- Born: November 11, 1997 (age 28) Tottori, Japan

Professional wrestling career
- Ring name(s): Funky Jacky Kamei; Jacky "Funky" Kamei; Taketo Kamei
- Billed height: 163 cm (5 ft 4 in)
- Billed weight: 70 kg (154 lb)
- Trained by: Dragon Gate Dojo
- Debut: 2019

Taketo Kamei (亀井丈人, Kamei Takehito), better known by his ring name Jacky "Funky" Kamei, is a Japanese professional wrestler currently working for the Japanese promotion Dragon Gate where he is a former Open the Twin Gate Champion and Open the Triangle Gate Champion.

== Professional wrestling career ==
=== Dragon Gate (2019–present) ===
Kamei made his professional wrestling debut in Dragon Gate at Dragon Gate PRIME ZONE Vol. 76, an event promoted on April 16, 2019, where he fell short to Kento Kobune as a result of a Singles match. After almost three years of rookie status, he eventually began chasing various championships, and capturing the Open the Triangle Gate Championship alongside Kzy and U-T at Truth Gate 2022 on February 20, where they defeated Z-Brats (H.Y.O, BxB Hulk and Shun Skywalker) in a tournament final to win the vacant titles. His biggest accomplishment to date is the Open the Twin Gate Championship which he has won alongside Jason Lee at Kobe World 2022 - Último Dragón Debut 35th Anniversary on July 30, 2022 by defeating Z-Brats (Shun Skywalker and Diamante).

Kamei is known for competing in various of the promotion's signature events, such as the King of Gate tournament, making his first appearance at the 2022 edition where he defeated Yosuke Santa Maria in the first rounds but fell short to Shuji Kondo in the second. He also competed in a battle royal for a second chance in the tournament, won by Kota Minoura and also involving various other opponents such as Dragon Kid, Susumu Mochizuki, Yamato, Keisuke Okuda, Kaito Ishida, Eita, Minorita, Madoka Kikuta and others.

Kamei competed in the Gate of Destiny series of pay-per-views, which is considered to be the promotion's top yearly event. He made his first appearance at the 2020 edition where he teamed up with Kento Kobune and Madoka Kikuta to defeat Team Toryumon (Masato Yoshino, Último Dragón and Yasushi Kanda). During his tenure, Kamei joined the "Natural Vibes" unit. At the 2021 edition of the Gate of Destiny, he teamed up with stablemates Kzy, U-T and Genki Horiguchi in a losing effort against Naruki Doi, Takashi Yoshida, Don Fujii and Gamma. At the 2022 event, Kamei temed up with Kzy and Jason Lee to defeat Naruki Doi, Último Dragón, Don Fujii and Shuji Kondo.

=== Independent circuit (2022–present) ===
The only other promotion from the Japanese independent scene for which Kamei has worked is Pro Wrestling Noah. He took part in a cross-over event promoted by them alongside Dragon Gate on November 11, 2022, the NOAH Global Dream where he teamed up with "Natural Vibes" stablemate Kzy and Yo-Hey to defeat Genki Horiguchi, Nosawa Rongai and Ryo Saito in a six-man tag team match.

== Championships and accomplishments ==
- Dragon Gate
  - Open the Twin Gate Championship (2 times) – with Jason Lee (1) and Riiita (1)
  - Open the Triangle Gate Championship (2 times) – with Kzy and U-T (1) and Hyo and Riiita (1)
