= Kaito Ishida =

Japanese professional wrestler

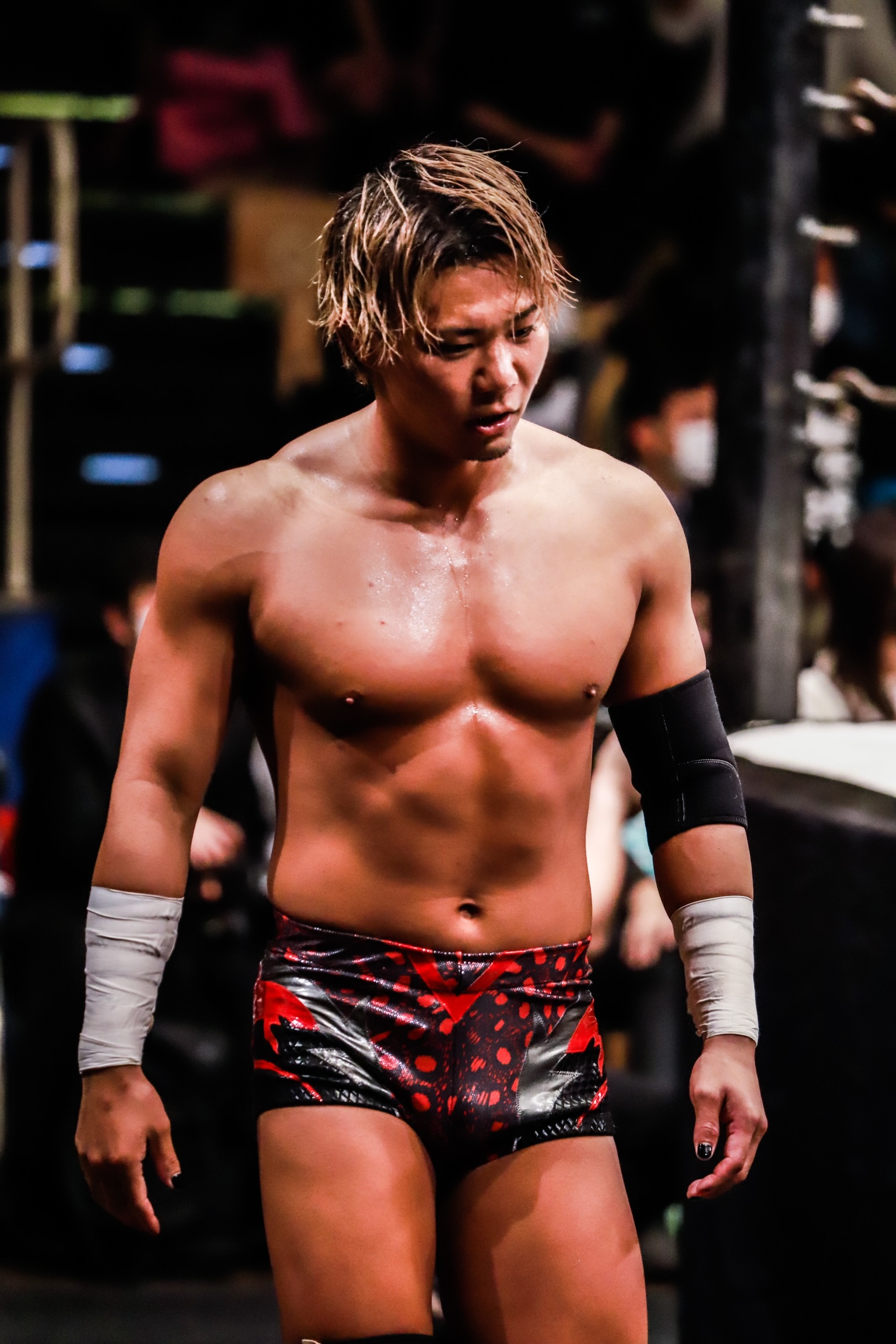
- Ishida in 2022

Personal information
- Born: December 19, 1995 (age 30) Osaka, Japan

Professional wrestling career
- Ring name(s): Ma-kun; Green Mask; Kaito Ishida
- Billed height: 173 cm (5 ft 8 in)
- Billed weight: 70 kg (154 lb)
- Debut: 2015

Kaito Ishida (石田凱士, Ishida Kaito) (born December 19, 1995) is a Japanese professional wrestler, currently working for the Japanese professional wrestling promotion Gleat, where he is a former two-times G-Rex Champion and former two-time G-Infinity Champion. He is also known for his work in Dragon Gate, where he was a one-time Open the Brave Gate Champion.

== Professional wrestling career ==
=== Independent circuit (2015–present) ===
Ishida worked a couple of matches outside of Dragon Gate. At Tokyo Carnival 2017, an event promoted by Tokyo Gurentai on July 17, he teamed up with Takehiro Yamamura, Cima and Eita as Over Generation, falling short to Nosawa Rongai, Minoru Fujita, Kazuhiko Masada and Kikutaro in an eight-man tag team match. On October 9, 2017, he took part in the Hbc Radio Produce Radi Pro 25th Anniversary, an event produced by the japanese independent scene portraiting twenty-five years of the Hokkaido Broadcasting, where he teamed up with Super Shisa to defeat K-ness and Shun Skywalker. Ishida also worked a couple of matches for Osaka Pro Wrestling, one of them taking place at Osaka Pro Wrestling Rainy Season Sky Fly Away on June 2, 2018, where he fell short to HUB.

==== Dragon Gate (2015–2022) ====
Ishida made his professional wrestling debut at Sapporo Teisen Hall Final Match, an event promoted by Dragon Gate on May 31, 2015, where he went in a time-limit draw against Takehiro Yamamura. At Dragon Gate Rainbow Gate 2019 on June 30, he participated in a 24-man pinfall battle royal also involving the winner Yosuke Santa Maria and other notable opponents such as Flamita, Masato Yoshino and The Bodyguard. Ishida took part in a rare ten-man tag team match contested under two-count rules on the 16th night of the Gate Of Evolution 2018 event from November 30, where he teamed up with his MaxiMuM stablemates Dragon Kid, Jason Lee, Masato Yoshino and Naruki Doi, falling short to R.E.D. (Ben-K, Eita, Pac and Takashi Yoshida) accompanied by Daga. Ishida was part of the Over Generation stable since 2016. But on the 11th day of the Dragon Gate Rainbow Gate 2018 event from July 5, he teamed up with his stablemates Dragon Kid, Gamma and Mondai Ryu, falling short to ANTIAS (Eita, Shingo Takagi, Takashi Yoshida and Yasushi Kanda) in an eight-man elimination tag team match in which the losing unit was forced to disband. At Dragon Gate Dead Or Alive 2021 on May 5, he teamed up with his R.E.D. stablemate Kazma Sakamoto to defeat Masaaki Mochizuki and Takashi Yoshida for the Open the Twin Gate Championship.

He is known for participating in notable events of the promotion such as King of Gate, competing for the first time on the 2019 edition, placing himself in the Block C and scoring a total of four points after going against Ben-K, Yamato, Genki Horiguchi, Takashi Yoshida and Kagetora. At the 2020 edition of the event, he took part in the Block B, shared with BxB Hulk, Genki Horiguchi, Kai, Big R Shimizu, Jason Lee whom he defeated in the first round, Keisuke Okuda in the second round and Naruki Doi in the quarter-finals, but fell short to him in the next stage due to him getting a second chance in the tournament. He is currently competing in the 2021 edition in the Block C, sharing the competition with Keisuke Okuda, Yamato, Shun Skywalker, U-T and H.Y.O.

At Gate of Destiny 2020 from November 3, Ishida dropped the Open the Brave Gate Championship to Keisuke Okuda.

== Championships and accomplishments ==
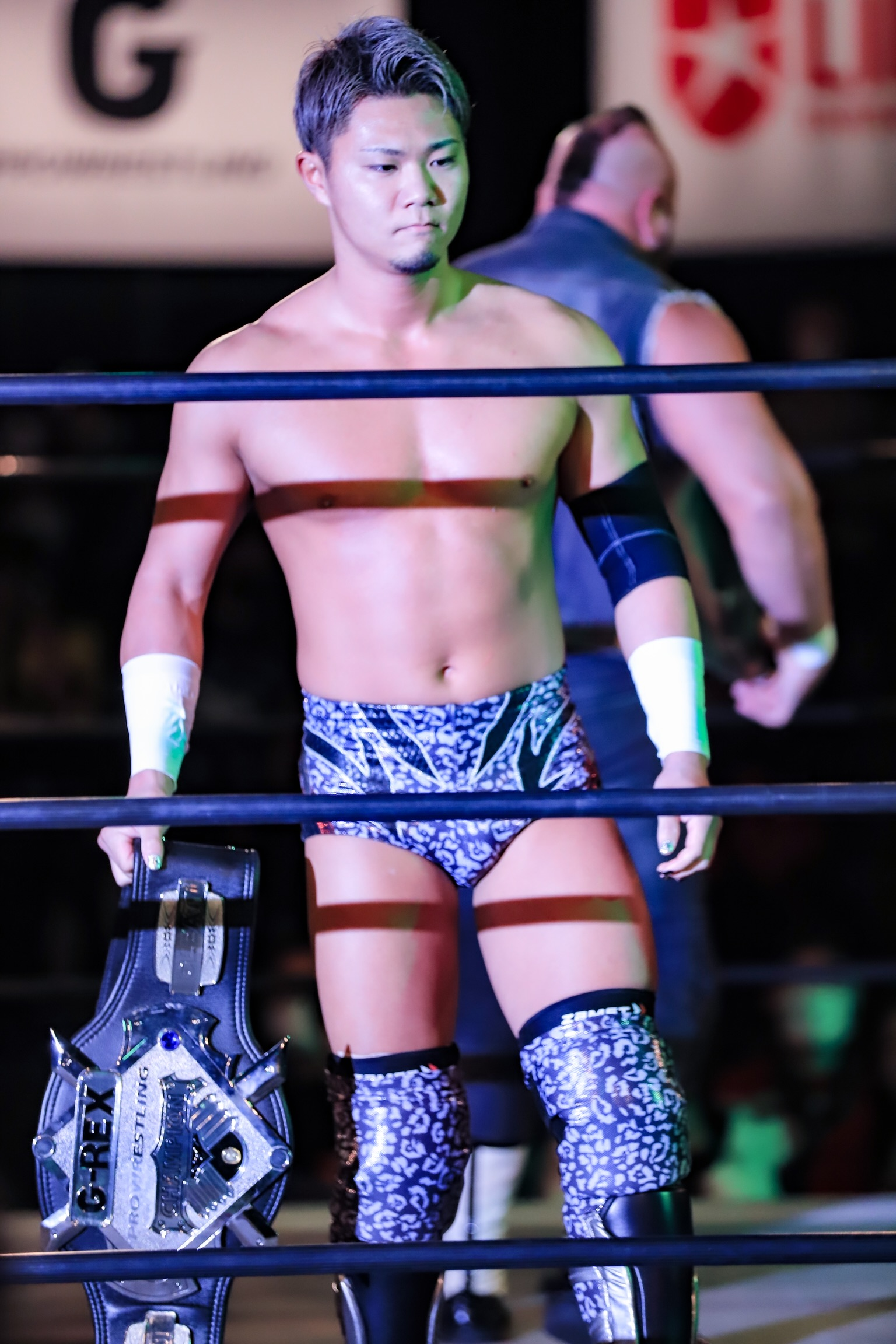
Ishida is a two-time G-Rex Champion

- Dragon Gate
  - Open the Brave Gate Championship (1 time)
  - Open the Twin Gate Championship (1 time) – with Kazma Sakamoto
  - Open the Triangle Gate Championship (3 times) – with Eita and H.Y.O (2), Naruki Doi and Kota Minoura (1)
- Gleat
  - G-Rex Championship (2 times)
  - G-Infinity Championship (2 times) – with Tetsuya Izuchi (1) and Kazma Sakamoto (1)
  - G-Infinity Title Tournament (2025) with – Kazma Sakamoto
- All Japan Pro Wrestling
  - Jr. Tag Battle Of Glory (2023) – with Kotaro Suzuki
- Pro Wrestling Illustrated
  - Ranked No. 319 of the top 500 singles wrestlers in the PWI 500 in 2023
- Wrestling Observer Newsletter
  - Ranked no. 9 on the top 10 of the 2015 Rookie Of The Year
