= Ben-K =

Japanese professional wrestler

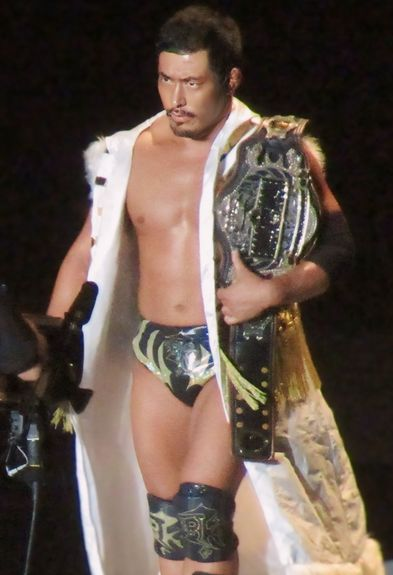
- Ben-K as the Open the Dream Gate Champion in July 2024

Personal information
- Born: October 19, 1991 (age 34) Sakura, Chiba, Japan

Professional wrestling career
- Ring name(s): Ben-K; Futa Nakamura
- Billed height: 175 cm (5 ft 9 in)
- Billed weight: 100 kg (220 lb)
- Trained by: Dragon Gate Dojo
- Debut: April 22, 2016

Futa Nakamura (中村風太, Nakamura Fūta; born October 10, 1991) is a Japanese professional wrestler currently signed to Dragon Gate under the ring name Ben-K.

== Professional wrestling career ==
=== Dragon Gate ===
==== Debut and early career (2016–2017) ====
Nakamura attended both Chiba Prefectural High School and Yamanashi Gakuin University where he was a part of the wrestling team, and after graduating from university, he joined the Dragon Gate dojo in 2015. After competing in dark matches and Dragon Gate house shows for months, Nakamura's first televised appearance was a loss to Big R Shimizu on May 23, 2016 on a Dragon Gate Nex show. Shortly after his debut, Nakamura was announced as a participant in the 2016 Summer Adventure Tag League, where he would be partnered with Dragon Gate veteran Masaaki Mochizuki. After taking a lariat from Shingo Takagi on August 21, Nakamura developed a concussion and he and Mochizuki were forced to drop out of the tournament. Nakamura returned in September at the Dangerous Gate pay-per-view, teaming with Don Fujii, El Lindaman and Shun Watanabe to defeat Gamma, Kaito Ishida, Takehiro Yamamura and Hyo Watanabe.

On November 10 in Korakuen Hall, Nakamura was renamed to Ben-K, based on the legend of 12th century warrior monk Saitō Musashibō Benkei. In his first match as Ben-K, he and Shun Watanabe (now known as Shun Skywalker) lost to Jimmy Susumu and Jimmy Kagetora. On December 25 at Final Gate 2016, he got his first title shot in Dragon Gate, pairing up with Kotoka and Masato Yoshino to challenge for the Open the Triangle Gate Championship in a three-way match won by the Jimmyz (Jimmy Kanda, Jimmy Susumu and Ryo "Jimmy" Saito). In early 2017, Naruki Doi and Big R Shimizu made a call to the entire roster, looking for a third man to help them challenge for the Triangle Gate belts. Ben accepted, and on March 20, they defeated VerserK (Shingo Takagi, T-Hawk and "brother" Yasshi) to win the vacant titles. On May 4, Doi and Yoshino announced the formation of their new stable, known as "MaxiMuM", with Kotoka, Big R Shimizu and Ben-K announced as the members, along with themselves. During May, Ben-K took part in his first King of Gate tournament, but struggled greatly, earning just one win over Yosuke♥Santa Maria. On July 1, MaxiMuM dropped the Triangle Gate titles to VerserK (Shingo Takagi, El Lindaman and Takashi Yoshida). On November 3 at the Gate of Destiny, Ben-K and Big R Shimizu, who called themselves "Big Ben", unsuccessfully challenged Cima and Dragon Kid for the Open the Twin Gate Championship. On February 11, 2018, he received a non-title singles match against then Open the Dream Gate Champion Masaaki Mochizuki, in which he dominated and beat the champion in just over two minutes. After the match, he challenged Mochizuki to a match for the Dream Gate title, which was accepted and set up for March 4 at Champion Gate in Osaka. After 23 minutes, Ben-K lost a hard-fought bout by referee's decision and failed to capture the title. On May 6 at Dead or Alive, Big Ben won the Twin Gate championships, defeating Antias (Eita and T-Hawk). Ben-K once again entered the King of Gate tournament in 2018 and fared much better than the previous year. He earned 5 points, however, a loss to Yamato eliminated him. On July 22 at Kobe World Pro Wrestling Festival, Big Ben lost the Twin Gate titles to Tribe Vanguard (BxB Hulk and Yamato) and not long after Big R Shimizu turned his back on MaxiMuM and joined heel unit Antias, effectively breaking up Big Ben. However, the break-up would not last long, as on September 6 in Korakuen, Ben-K himself turned heel for the first time in his career, betraying MaxiMuM to join Antias with Big R.

==== R.E.D. (2018–2019) ====
Less than a month after Ben-K joined, Antias was renamed to R.E.D. with Eita taking over as the leader, and on September 24, Ben-K challenged his former friend and MaxiMuM stablemate Masato Yoshino to a match for his Open the Dream Gate Championship, which Yoshino accepted. In his second shot at the title, Ben was defeated by Yoshino at The Gate of Destiny on November 4. On December 23 at Final Gate, Big Ben won the vacant Twin Gate titles in a four-way match. In January, Shimizu accidentally attacked Ben-K during a match and almost cost his team the victory in their match against MaxiMuM. This led to tension between Shimizu and Eita, with the rest of the group siding with Eita and turning their back on Shimizu. On February 10, Big Ben were wrestling against Kai and U-T when Eita cost them the match by hitting Ben-K with a chair. This led to Ben-K being the only R.E.D. member to side with Shimizu. On March 3, Big Ben defeated U-T and Kai in a rematch, this time with the Twin Gate titles on the line. On March 7, Ben accidentally caused R.E.D. to lose a four-way sixteen-man tag team elimination match by attacking Yasushi Kanda. With Dead or Alive coming up, general manager Takayuki Yagi announced that there would be a series of tag team matches putting members of every unit against each other, with the member who earned the pinfall representing their team in the Dead or Alive steel cage match. On April 10, Big Ben defeated Eita and Takashi Yoshida, with Shimizu pinning Eita and earning his way into Dead or Alive. In the lead up to Dead or Alive, Big Ben would finally drop the Twin Gate titles after Eita once again cost them the match by hitting Ben with a chair on April 28. At Dead or Alive on May 6, Eita and Ben attempted to put their differences aside and co-exist in a tag match against MaxiMuM's Kaito Ishida and Masato Yoshino, however, Ben finally had enough and speared Eita during the match, purposefully costing them the win. Later in the night, Big R was defeated in Dead or Alive, and by stipulation was forced to kick a member out of R.E.D. Expecting him to pick Eita, Ben was blindsided when the rest of the group attacked him and kicked him out of the group, revealing all tensions between Shimizu and Eita had been an elaborate ruse to get Ben, whom they viewed as the "weak link", kicked out of R.E.D. This subsequently turned Ben face.

==== Open the Dream Gate Champion (2019–present) ====
After being kicked out of R.E.D., Ben-K declared himself a lone wolf, and chose not to join any other stables. He entered the King of Gate for the third time and dominated, going undefeated in all his block matches and beating Kzy to reach the final, where he beat Eita to win the 2019 King of Gate. In the process, he became the first and so far only wrestler to ever win the tournament without losing a single match. After winning, Ben challenged former stablemate Pac to his third match for the Open the Dream Gate Championship. On July 21 at Kobe World Pro Wrestling Festival, Ben defeated Pac to win the Dream Gate title for the first time in his career. Ben-K lost the championship to Naruki Doi at Final Gate 2019 on December 15.

== Championships and accomplishments ==
- Dragon Gate
  - Open the Dream Gate Championship (2 times)
  - Open the Triangle Gate Championship (4 times) – with Big R Shimizu and Naruki Doi (1), with Strong Machine J and Dragon Dia (1), BxB Hulk and Kota Minoura (1) and Hyo and Mochizuki Jr. (1)
  - Open the Twin Gate Championship (2 times) – with Big R Shimizu (2)
  - King of Gate (2019)
- Pro Wrestling Illustrated
  - Ranked No. 120 of the top 500 singles wrestlers in the PWI 500 in 2024
