= Hyo Watanabe =

Japanese professional wrestler

Hyo
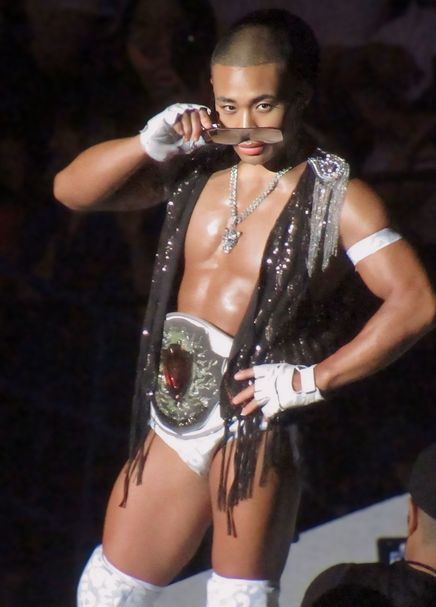
- Hyo in July 2024

Personal information
- Born: January 4, 1997 (age 29) Toyohashi, Japan

Professional wrestling career
- Ring name(s): Hyosuke Santa Maria; Hyo Watanabe; H・Y・O; Hyo
- Billed height: 163 cm (5 ft 4 in)
- Billed weight: 73 kg (161 lb)
- Trained by: Dragon Gate Dojo
- Debut: 2016

Hyo Watanabe (渡邉 彪, Watanabe Hyō; born January 4, 1997), better known simply as Hyo (豹, Hyō; formerly stylized as H・Y・O), is a Japanese professional wrestler. He is signed to Dragongate, where he is one-third of the current Open the Triangle Gate Champions with Riiita and Jacky Kamei. He is two-time Open the Brave Gate Champion and a one-time Open the Twin Gate Champion.

== Professional wrestling career ==
=== Dragon Gate (2016–present) ===
Watanabe made his professional wrestling debut in Dragon Gate at Dragon Gate NEX Sanctuary.141, an event promoted on April 22, 2016, where he defeated Katsumi Takashima in a dark match. After a few years of rookie status, he eventually began chasing various championships, and capturing the Open the Triangle Gate Championship alongside Takashi Yoshida and Diamante after defeating Strong Machine J, Strong Machine F and Strong Machine G at Kobe Pro-Wrestling Festival 2019 on July 21. At Final Gate 2021 on December 26, Watanabe teamed up with R.E.D. stablemate SB Kento to win the Open the Twin Gate Championship from Naruki Doi and Takashi Yoshida. His biggest accomplishment to date is the Open the Brave Gate Championship, title which he has first won at Kobe World 2022 on July 30 after defeating Dragon Dia. On February 4, 2022, on the first night of the DG Truth Gate, it was revealed that the unit of R.E.D. was rebranded as Z-Brats, thus ending the initial stable's tenure as the main heel unit. Watanabe continued to be part of Z-Brats until November 2023, when he turned on the stable, and aligned himself with Luís Mante. Watanabe and Mante formed a tag team named Big Hug, which later became a stable with the addition of Jacky Kamei.

Watanabe is known for competing in various of the promotion's signature events, such as the King of Gate tournament, making first appearance at the 2020 edition where he fell short to Kzy in the first rounds. At the 2021 edition, he placed himself in the "Block C" where he failed to score any points after competing against Yamato, Shun Skywalker, Kaito Ishida and U-T. At the 2022 edition, he fought into a double disqualification against Dragon Dia which attracted an elimination for both of them from the first rounds.

Watanabe competed in the Gate of Destiny series of pay-per-views, which is considered to be the promotion's top yearly event. He made his first appearance at the 2016 edition where he teamed up with Shun Skywalker and Futa Nakamura and defeated Over Generation (Punch Tominaga, Kaito Ishida and Takehiro Yamamura) as a result of a six-man tag team match. One year later at the 2017 edition, he fell short to Skywalker in a Dark match. At the 2018 edition, Watanabe teamed up with Natural Vibes (Punch Tominaga and "brother" Yasshi in a losing effort against Don Fujii, Gamma and Ryo Saito. In 2019, Watanabe joined the R.E.D. stable, and at the year's "Gate of Destiny" on November 3, he teamed up with stablemates Kazma Sakamoto, Takashi Yoshida and Diamante, and fought Genki Horiguchi, K-ness, Super Shisa and Último Dragón into a double count-out. At the 2020 edition, he teamed up with stablemates BxB Hulk, Dia Inferno in a losing effort against Team Dragon Gate (Ben-K, Dragon Dia and Strong Machine J). His latest appearance was at the 2022 edition of the event where he successfully defended the Open the Brave Gate Championship against Dragon Kid.

On November 9, 2023, Watanabe turned against Z-Brats during a handicap match against Luis Mante, helping Mante defeat the faction. The two embraced afterward, beginning their partnership as Big Hug. Watanabe also began using the ring name Hyo, represented by the Japanese character 豹. The following month, Hyo defeated ISHIN to capture the Brave Gate Championship for a second time.

Hyo successfully defended the championship against several challengers, including Genki Horiguchi at Final Gate 2023 and Flamita in June 2024. His second reign ended on July 21, 2024, when he lost the title to Dragon Dia at Kobe Pro-Wrestling Festival 2024. Hyo had held the championship for more than seven months and made multiple successful defenses.

Hyo continued to compete as a member of Big Hug in 2024 and 2025, teaming regularly with Mante and Jacky Kamei, who joined the unit. In December 2025, Hyo participated in the King of Gate tournament, continuing his involvement in Dragon Gate's major annual competitions.

=== Independent circuit (2017–present) ===
Watanabe has occasionally competed for a number of promotions in the Japanese independent scene. At Osaka Pro Wrestling Rainy Season Sky Fly Away on June 2, 2018, he teamed up with Oji Shiiba and Yuki Yoshioka to defeat Kuishinbo Kamen, Tsubasa and Ultimate Spider Jr. At Majestic 2022 - N Innovation, an event promoted by Pro Wrestling Noah on April 29, Z-Brats stablemates SB Kento and Shun Skywalker to defeat Alejandro, Daisuke Harada and Junta Miyawaki.

== Championships and accomplishments ==
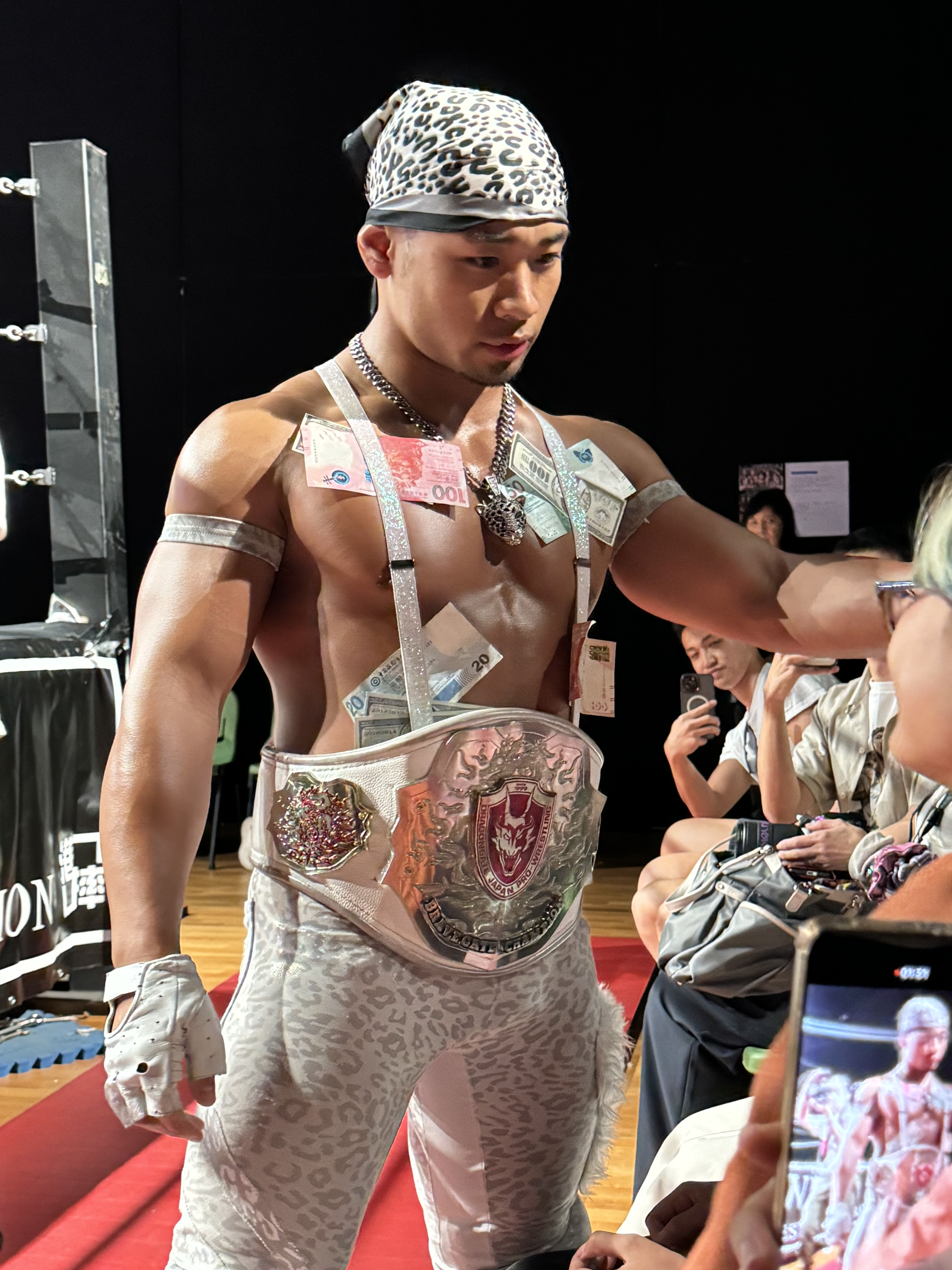
Watanabe is a two-time Open the Brave Gate Champion

- Dragon Gate
  - Open the Brave Gate Championship (2 times)
  - Open the Twin Gate Championship (1 time) – with SB Kento
  - Open the Triangle Gate Championship (5 times) – with Eita and Kaito Ishida (2); Takashi Yoshida and Diamante (1); Ben-K and Mochizuki Jr. (1 time), Riiita and Jacky Kamei (1 time, current)
- Pro Wrestling Illustrated
  - Ranked No. 168 of the top 500 singles wrestlers in the PWI 500 in 2024
