= R.E.D. (professional wrestling) =

Professional wrestling stable

Real Extreme Diffusion

Stable
- Name: R・E・D
- Former members: See below
- Debut: September 24, 2018
- Disbanded: February 4, 2022

Real Extreme Diffusion (リアル・エクストリーム・ディフュージョン, Riaru Ekusutorīmu Difyūjon), more commonly abbreviated as R・E・D, were a professional wrestling stable primarily appearing in the Japanese promotion Dragon Gate.

The group was formed on September 24, 2018 by former Antias members Ben-K, Yasushi Kanda, Takashi Yoshida, Big R Shimizu, Eita and freelancer Kazma Sakamoto. The group also included foreign wrestlers Pac and Daga, in which they represented the stable in other promotions.

== History ==
The group has history going back to 2015 when it originally formed as VerserK, before being renamed to Antias in January 2018. After the group suffered many losses in early 2018, with El Lindaman, T-Hawk and Shingo Takagi all leaving for other promotions, and general poor reception of the stable's second incarnation, new leader Eita announced a complete rebranding of the stable on September 6, and that same night, added Ben-K as the newest member after he betrayed his group MaxiMuM. The group re-debuted as R・E・D. on September 24, and announced new member Kazma Sakamoto. The night of the stable's debut would bring mixed success, as they defeated Natural Vibes in an All Out War ten-man tag team elimination match, but Eita lost the Open the Brave Gate Championship to Dragon Kid. 9 days later, Pac returned to Dragon Gate for the first time since 2012 and aligned himself with the group, teaming with Eita to defeat former Antias and VerserK leader Shingo Takagi and BxB Hulk in Korakuen Hall. On October 21, Eita announced Mexican wrestler Daga as the newest member. On December 4, Pac defeated Masato Yoshino to win the Open the Dream Gate Championship, becoming the first British wrestler to hold the title in the process. On December 23, more gold was bought to the group when Yoshida, Kanda and Sakamoto beat Natural Vibes (Kzy, Genki Horiguchi and Susumu Yokosuka) for the Open the Triangle Gate Championship and Ben-K and Shimizu won a four way match to capture the Open the Twin Gate Championship. In the main event, the feud between Eita and Dragon Kid culminated in a Luchas de Apuestas match, where, as per the stipulation, Eita shaved his head in the ring after failing to win back the Brave Gate Championship. In August 2021, Kazma Sakamoto began appearing in the Gleat wrestling promotion, effectively leaving the group. His profile was removed from the Dragon Gate roster website shortly after. On February 4, 2022, the group was rebranded as Z-Brats, thus ending R.E.D's tenure as the main heel unit.

== Members ==
As of June 30, 2026.

*	Founding member
I–II	Leader

=== Former ===
Member		Tenure
Big R Shimizu	*	September 24, 2018 – September 21, 2020
Ben-K	*	September 24, 2018 – May 6, 2019
Daga		October 21, 2018 – December 23, 2018
Dia Inferno/Yuki Yoshioka		October 7, 2020- January 12, 2022
Eita	* I	September 24, 2018 - January 12, 2022
Kaito Ishida		October 8, 2019 - January 12, 2022
Kazma Sakamoto	*	September 24, 2018 - August 1, 2021
Pac		October 2, 2018 – July 21, 2019
Takashi Yoshida	*	September 24, 2018 – January 13, 2021
Yasushi Kanda	*	September 24, 2018 – October 8, 2019
B×B Hulk		December 18, 2019 – February 4, 2022
Diamante		August 7, 2019 – February 4, 2022
H.Y.O		October 8, 2019 – February 4, 2022
HipHop Kikuta (Note: Formerly billed as Madoka Kikuta and currently billed as HipHop Kikuta by DG)		December 2, 2020 – February 4, 2022
Kai		September 21, 2020 – February 4, 2022
SB Kento (Note: Formerly billed as Kento Kobune and currently billed as SB KENTo by DG)		November 3, 2020 – February 4, 2022
Shun Skywalker	II	January 12, 2022 – February 4, 2022

== Championships and accomplishments ==
- Dragon Gate
  - Open the Dream Gate Championship (3 times) – Pac (1 time), Eita (1 time), KAI (1 time)
  - Open the Brave Gate Championship (4 times) – Eita (1 time), Ishida (1 time), KENTo (2 times)
  - Open the Triangle Gate Championship (6 times) – Sakamoto, Yoshida and Kanda (1 time), H.Y.O., Yoshida, Diamante (1 time), Diamante, Sakamoto and Yoshida (1 time), KENTo, Sakamoto and Yoshida (1 time), Eita, Ishida and H.Y.O. (2 times)
  - Open the Twin Gate Championship (6 times) – Shimizu and Ben-K (1 time), Eita and Shimizu (1 time), Hulk and Sakamoto (1 time), Hulk and KAI (1 time), Ishida and Sakamoto (1 time), KENTo and H.Y.O. (1 time)
