= Mad Blankey =

Professional wrestling stable

Stable
- Members: YAMATO; Punch Tominaga; Mondai Ryu; Cyber Kong; Naruki Doi; K-ness; Mr. Pii Pii Tomakomai Penguin/Naoki Tanisaki; Akira Tozawa; Uhaa Nation; BxB Hulk; Kzy; CIMA; Gamma; Don Fujii; Larry Dallas
- Debut: March 1, 2012
- Disbanded: August 16, 2015

Mad Blankey, or MB for short, was a professional wrestling stable in the Japanese promotion Dragon Gate, formed on March 1, 2012. It was founded by former Blood Warriors members Akira Tozawa, BxB Hulk, Cyber Kong, Tomahawk T.T., and Kzy. On August 1, 2013, after Tozawa had led MAD BLANKEY to victory against -akatsuki- in a match, where the losing stable would have to disband, the rest of MAD BLANKEY turned on him, kicking him out of the group and assuming YAMATO their new leader. On August 16, 2015 MAD BLANKEY was forced to disband after losing to Jimmyz in a 5-on-5 elimination tag team match, where they were betrayed by K-Ness, who had defected to the Jimmyz.

== History ==
=== Tozawa era (2012–2013) ===
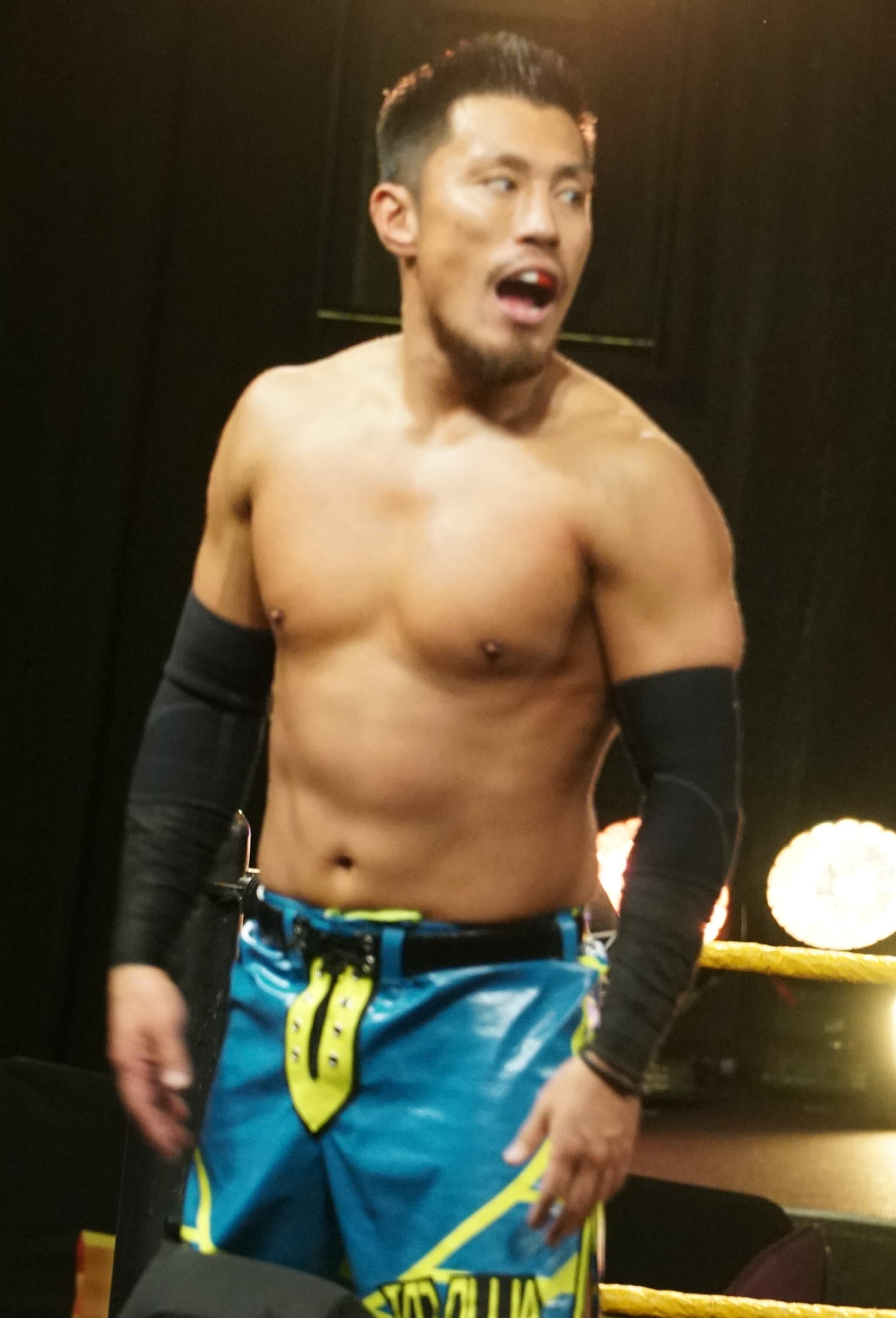
First leader of the stable, Akira Tozawa

On March 1, 2012 Akira Tozawa renamed the Blood Warriors as MAD BLANKEY. The name is a combination of musical groups Mad Capsule Markets and Blankey Jet City, of which BxB Hulk is a fan of. Hulk also created the unit logo and colour scheme. Three days later, he and BxB Hulk lost the Open the Twin Gate Championship to Jimmy Kagetora and Jimmy Susumu. Super Shenlong joined in March, changing his name to Mondai Ryu. On June 10, 2012, Hulk and Naoki Tanisaki won the Open the Twin Gate Championship from Jimmy Kagetora and Jimmy Susumu. However, they lost the belts back to them on June 17 in a 3-way elimination tag team match which also included WindowsMG members K-ness and Kenichiro Arai. On August 19, Hulk, Tozawa and Tanisaki defeated CIMA, Gamma and Magnitude Kishiwada to win the 2012 Summer Adventure Tag League and the vacant Open the Triangle Gate Championship. On September 23, Mad Blankey defended the Open the Triangle Gate Championship against the Jimmyz (Genki Horiguchi H.A.Gee.Mee!!, Ryo "Jimmy" Saito and Naoki Tanizaki), with the added stipulation that if Mad Blankey won the match they would also win the rights to the "Naoki Tanizaki" name. Mad Blankey won the match and thus the rights to the name. After the match, the defeated former-Tanizaki wanted to rename himself to Naoki Jimmy, but the victorious Tanisaki claimed the right to choose Tanizaki's new name. Saying that Tanizaki's whining and crying reminded him of the "kyu kyu" noise a dolphin makes, he renamed Tanizaki to Mr. Kyu Kyu Toyonaka Dolphin. On October 21, 2013 Mad Blankey lost the Triangle Gate championship to Kaettekita Veteran-gun (Gamma, HUB and Magnitude Kishiwada). Following a failed challenge at the Open the Twin Gate Championship on December 23, 2012, Cyber Kong was kicked out of MAD BLANKEY. On June 15, 2013, Hulk and Tozawa regained the Open the Twin Gate Championship from Shingo Takagi and YAMATO, when YAMATO turned on Takagi and joined MAD BLANKEY. The feud between the current and the former Naoki Tanizaki saw "Mr. Kyu Kyu Toyonaka Dolphin" win the 2013 New Year Dragon Scramble match over, among others, Naoki Tanisaki. A few weeks later the two faced off in a "loser leaves town" match, which initially saw Tanisaki win, only to have an immediate rematch take place with the same stipulation, won by Tonoyaka Dolphin, negating the results of the earlier match and giving Naoki Tanizaki the rights back to his name. He also renamed the fake Tanisaki "Mr. Pii Pii Tomakomai Penguin". The rivalry culminated on February 11, when the Jimmyz defeated Mad Blankey in a five-on-five elimination tag team match, as a result of which Penguin was exiled from Dragon Gate. After the match, Tanizaki shook hands with Penguin and offered to team with him in the future. Tanizaki then also fought off Mad Blankey, when they turned on Penguin for losing the match. On February 15, Penguin teamed with Tanizaki, who worked as "Mr. Kyu Kyu Naoki Tanizaki Toyonaka Dolphin", in a tag team match, where the two lost to Tozawa and Hulk. Hulk and Tozawa would go on to lose the Open the Twin Gate Championship to Naruki Doi and Ricochet on July 21.

=== Yamato era (2013–2015) ===
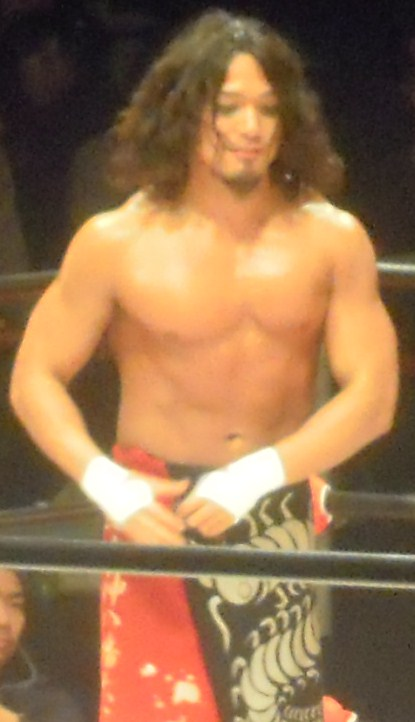
Second leader of the stable, Yamato

On August 1, 2013, after Tozawa had led Mad Blankey to victory against -akatsuki- in a match, where the losing stable would have to disband, the rest of Mad Blankey turned on him, kicking him out of the group and assuming Yamato their new leader. On August 23, Yamato defeated Shingo Takagi to win the Open the Dream Gate Championship. On August 30, Mad Blankey turned on Uhaa Nation after he refused to wrestle Akira Tozawa Cyber Kong would also rejoin Mad Blankey on the same night. Uhaa Nation and Tozawa, along with Shingo Takagi formed the Monster Express shortly afterwards. On September 12, 2013, Naruki Doi turned on Masato Yoshino and jumped to Mad Blankey, also signalling the end of World-1 International. On October 6, Kong, BxB Hulk and Yamato won the vacant Open the Triangle Gate Championship by defeating Monster Express' Akira Tozawa, Masato Yoshino and Shingo Takagi. On October 10, 2013, Yamato lost the Open the Dream Gate Championship to Yoshino. On December 5, Mad Blankey also lost the Open the Triangle Gate Championship to Millennials (Eita, Flamita and T-Hawk). On May 5, 2014, Yamato won the Open the Dream Gate Championship for a record-tying third time by defeating Ricochet. On the same night, after being the last to escape and win the Cage match at Dead or Alive 2014, Hulk quit Mad Blankey, thus turning face. On June 5, Mad Blankey defeated Hulk in a five on one handicap match to retain the naming rights of Mad Blankey when Hulk was attacked by Dr. Muscle. Dr. Muscle was later revealed to be Punch Tominaga. Yamato lost the title to former Mad Blankey stablemate BxB Hulk on July 20. After Kzy and Doi both suffered long-term injuries, Mad Blankey added some temporary members which were picked by "Miracle Doi Darts" and were CIMA, Gamma, Don Fujii and K-ness. On December 28, Cyber Kong and Yamato would defeat the Millennials (Eita and T-Hawk) for the Open the Twin Gate Championship. Kzy would return from his injury on January 10, 2015 as Dr. Muscle to participate in the Open the Brave Gate Championship tournament and two day later would defeat Eita in the finals to win his first Open the Brave Gate Championship. On January 16, he would cost the unit a 6 on 6 "All Out War" against the Millennials by throwing salt in Cima's face. He would then unmask and declare his allegiance to Dia.HEARTS. On February 5, Metal Warrior would interfere in a 3-Way 6-Man Tag Team match between MB, Dia.HEARTS and the Millennials. He would feign a move to Dia.Hearts, helping them throughout the match, but near the end, betraying them and solidifying his allegiance to MAD BLANKEY. After the match, Metal Warrior revealed himself to be a returning Naruki Doi. On May 5, Cima, Don Fujii and Gamma were kicked out of Mad Blankey. On June 13, Yamato and Naruki Doi defeated Masato Yoshino and Shachihoko Boy to win their second Open the Twin Gate Championship as a team, and the 7th title reign for the Mad Blankey unit. On August 6, Mad Blankey forced the Millennials to disband after defeating them in a Losing Unit Disbands Three Way Survival Elimination Match which also featured the Jimmyz.

On August 16, Mad Blankey was forced to disband after losing to Jimmyz in a 5-on-5 elimination tag team match, where they were betrayed by K-Ness, who had defected to the Jimmyz.

== Championships and accomplishments ==
- Dragon Gate
  - Open the Brave Gate Championship (1 time) – Dr. Muscle
  - Open the Dream Gate Championship (2 times) – YAMATO
  - Provisional Open The Dream Gate Championship (1 time) – Doi
  - Open the Triangle Gate Championship (3 times) – Hulk, Tanisaki and Tozawa (1), Hulk, Kong and Yamato (1), Doi, Kong and Kzy (1)
  - Open the Twin Gate Championship (7 times) – Doi and YAMATO (2), Hulk and Tanisaki (1), Hulk and Tozawa (2), Hulk and Nation (1), Kong and YAMATO (1)
  - Summer Adventure Tag League (2012) – Hulk, Tanisaki and Tozawa
  - Open the Twin Gate #1 Contender's One Night Tournament (2012) – Kong and Tanisaki
