= Open the Twin Gate Championship =

Professional wrestling tag team championship

- Previous championship design

Details
- Promotion: Dragongate
- Date established: October 12, 2007
- Current champions: Paradox (Kagetora and Susumu Yokosuka)
- Date won: November 15, 2026

Other name
- Open the Twin Gate Unified Tag Team Championship
Statistics
- First champions: Speed Muscle (Masato Yoshino and Naruki Doi)
- Most reigns: (as team) T-Hawk and Eita (4 reign) (as individual) Yamato (10 reigns)
- Longest reign: CK-1 (Cima and Dragon Kid) (397 days)
- Shortest reign: Osaka06 (Cima and Gamma) (<1 day)
- Oldest champion: Masaaki Mochizuki (51 years, 49 days)
- Youngest champion: Kota Minoura (21 years, 307 days)

The Open the Twin Gate Championship (オープン・ザ・ツインゲート王座, Ōpun za Tsuingēto Ōza) is a professional wrestling tag team title created and promoted by the Japanese promotion Dragongate. The title was introduced on August 26, 2007, as an interim title for the winners of the first Summer Adventure Tag League tournament. It was then unified with the Wrestle Association R International Junior Heavyweight Tag Team Championship on October 12, 2007, to determine the inaugural Open the Twin Gate champions.

== History ==
Dragongate had been using the WAR IJ Tag Team Championship since 2006, until 2007 when Masato Yoshino and Naruki Doi were declared interim Open the Twin Gate Champions after winning the first edition of the Summer Adventure Tag League tournament. They later proposed a title unification match against IJ Tag Team Champions Kenichiro Arai and Taku Iwasa. On October 12, during the Gate of Victory tour, Doi and Yoshino won the unification bout at Korakuen Hall, making them the inaugural champions.

== Reigns ==
As of November 15, 2026, there has been a total of 72 reigns shared between 50 different teams consisting of 50 distinctive champions. The current title holders are Paradox (Kagetora and Susumu Yokosuka), who are in their fourth reign as a team; the ninth individually for Yokosuka and the fourth for Kagetora. The teams of Naruki Doi and Yamato, and Cima and Dragon Kid hold the most successful consecutive defenses with nine. Cima and Dragon Kid are also the longest-reigning champions, with their first reign as a team totaling 397 days.

Key
No.	Overall reign number
Reign	Reign number for the specific team—reign numbers for the individuals are in parentheses, if different
Days	Number of days held
Defenses	Number of successful defenses
<1	Reign lasted less than a day
+	Current reign is changing daily

No.	Champion	Championship change			Reign statistics			Notes	Ref.
No.	Champion	Date	Event	Location	Reign	Days	Defenses	Notes	Ref.
Dragon Gate
1	Muscle Outlaw'z (Naruki Doi and Masato Yoshino)	October 12, 2007	The Gate of Victory	Tokyo, Japan	1	119	2	Defeated Tozawa-juku (Kenichiro Arai and Taku Iwasa) to unify the International Junior Heavyweight Tag Team Championship.	
2	Tozawa-juku (Kenichiro Arai and Taku Iwasa)	February 8, 2008	Truth Gate	Tokyo, Japan	1	87	2		
3	Typhoon (Susumu Yokosuka and Ryo Saito)	May 5, 2008	Dead or Alive	Nagoya, Japan	1	144	3		
4	World-1 (Naruki Doi and Masato Yoshino)	September 26, 2008	Storm Gate	Osaka, Japan	2	9	0		
5	Real Hazard (Cyber Kong and Yamato)	October 5, 2008	The Gate of Victory: Opening Day	Fukuoka, Japan	1	147	4		
6	Warriors-5 (Susumu Yokosuka and Gamma)	March 1, 2009	Truth Gate: Final Day	Osaka, Japan	1 (2, 1)	65	1		
7	Real Hazard (Genki Horiguchi and Ryo Saito)	May 5, 2009	Dead or Alive 2009	Nagoya, Japan	1 (1, 2)	135	3	This was a three-way elimination match also involving the team of Kenichiro Arai and Yasushi Kanda.	
8	Kamikaze (Shingo Takagi and Yamato)	September 17, 2009	Storm Gate	Tokyo, Japan	1 (1, 2)	101	3		
9	Warriors-5 (Cima and Gamma)	December 27, 2009	The Final Gate 2009	Fukuoka, Japan	1 (1, 2)	<1	0		
—	Vacated	December 27, 2009	The Final Gate 2009	Fukuoka, Japan	—	—	—	Cima and Gamma returned the title immediately and declared themselves interim champions.	
—	Warriors-5 (Cima and Gamma)	December 27, 2009	The Final Gate 2009	Fukuoka, Japan	—	45	0		
10	Warriors-5 (Cima and Gamma)	February 10, 2010	Truth Gate	Tokyo, Japan	2 (2, 3)	40	0	Defeated World-1 (Naruki Doi and Masato Yoshino) to win the vacant championship.	
11	Kamikaze (Shingo Takagi and Cyber Kong)	March 22, 2010	Compilation Gate 2010	Tokyo, Japan	1 (2, 2)	52	1		
12	K-neSuka (Susumu Yokosuka and K-ness.)	May 13, 2010	Aggressive Gate: Opening Day	Tokyo, Japan	1 (3, 1)	194	4		
13	Naruki Doi and Gamma	November 23, 2010	The Gate of Destiny 2010	Osaka, Japan	1 (3, 4)	48	1		
14	Masaaki Mochizuki and Don Fujii	January 10, 2011	2011 Primal Gate	Nagoya, Japan	1	27	0		
15	Blood Warriors (Genki Horiguchi and Ryo Saito)	February 6, 2011	Truth Gate	Fukuoka, Japan	2 (2, 3)	133	2		
16	Junction Three (Dragon Kid and Pac)	June 19, 2011	Champion Gate in Hakata	Fukuoka, Japan	1	28	0		
17	Blood Warriors (Cima and Ricochet)	July 17, 2011	Kobe Pro–Wrestling Festival 2011	Kobe, Japan	1 (3, 1)	136	3		
—	Vacated	November 30, 2011	Blood Warriors Self-Produce: 1st.Blood	Tokyo, Japan	—	—	—	Cima and Ricochet vacated the championship so Ricochet could focus on his Open the Brave Gate Championship and Cima could focus on going for the Open the Dream Gate Championship.	
18	Blood Warriors/Mad Blankey (B×B Hulk and Akira Tozawa)	December 1, 2011	Fantastic Gate: Opening Day	Tokyo, Japan	1	94	2	Defeated Junction Three Susumu Yokosuka and (Kagetora) to win the vacant championship.	
19	Jimmyz (Jimmy Susumu and Jimmy Kagetora)	March 4, 2012	Champion Gate in Osaka	Osaka, Japan	1 (4, 1)	98	3		
20	Mad Blankey (B×B Hulk and "Naoki Tanizaki")	June 10, 2012	The Gate of Maximum	Sapporo, Japan	1 (2, 1)	7	0		
21	Jimmyz (Jimmy Susumu and Jimmy Kagetora)	June 17, 2012	Champion Gate in Hakata	Fukuoka, Japan	2 (5, 2)	35	0	This was a three-way match, also involving the team of Kenichiro Arai and K-ness.	
22	Akatsuki (Shingo Takagi and Yamato)	July 22, 2012	Kobe Pro–Wrestling Festival 2012	Kobe, Japan	2 (3, 3)	63	1		
23	Team Veteran Returns (Masaaki Mochizuki and Don Fujii)	September 23, 2012	Dangerous Gate 2012	Tokyo, Japan	2	160	6		
24	Mad Blankey (B×B Hulk and Uhaa Nation)	March 2, 2013	Champion Gate in Osaka	Osaka, Japan	1 (3, 1)	64	1		
25	Akatsuki (Shingo Takagi and Yamato)	May 5, 2013	Dead or Alive 2013	Nagoya, Japan	3 (4, 4)	41	1		
26	Mad Blankey (B×B Hulk and Akira Tozawa)	June 15, 2013	Champion Gate in Hakata	Fukuoka, Japan	2 (4, 2)	36	0		
27	World-1 International (Naruki Doi and Ricochet)	July 21, 2013	Kobe Pro-Wrestling Festival 2013	Kobe, Japan	1 (4, 2)	40	0		
28	We Are Team Veteran (Dragon Kid and K-ness.)	August 30, 2013	The Gate of Generation	Kobe, Japan	1 (2, 2)	8	0		
—	Vacated	September 7, 2013	Summer Adventure Tag League 2013	Osaka, Japan	—	—	—	Title vacated after Dragon Kid suffered a knee injury.	
—	Millennials (T-Hawk and Eita)	September 28, 2013	Summer Adventure Tag League 2013	Kobe, Japan	—	36	0	Defeated Mad Blankey (B×B Hulk and Yamato) in the finals of the 2013 Summer Adventure Tag League to become interim champions.	
29	Millennials (T-Hawk and Eita)	November 3, 2013	The Gate of Destiny 2013	Osaka, Japan	1 (2, 1)	35	0	Defeated former champions We Are Team Veteran (Dragon Kid and K-ness.) to become the official champions.	
30	Mad Blankey (Naruki Doi and Yamato)	December 8, 2013	Fantastic Gate	Sapporo, Japan	1 (5, 5)	14	0		
31	Monster Express (Shingo Takagi and Akira Tozawa)	December 22, 2013	The Final Gate 2013	Fukuoka, Japan	1 (5, 3)	210	5		
32	Millennials (T-Hawk and Eita)	July 20, 2014	Kobe Pro–Wrestling Festival 2014	Kobe, Japan	2 (3, 2)	105	2		
33	Osaka06 (Cima and Gamma)	November 2, 2014	The Gate of Destiny 2014	Osaka, Japan	3 (4, 5)	31	0		
34	Millennials (T-Hawk and Eita)	December 3, 2014	Fantastic Gate: Opening Day	Tokyo, Japan	3 (4, 3)	25	0		
35	Mad Blankey (Yamato and Cyber Kong)	December 28, 2014	The Final Gate 2014	Fukuoka, Japan	2 (6, 3)	63	0		
36	Monster Express (Masato Yoshino and Shachihoko Boy)	March 1, 2015	Champion Gate 2016 in Osaka	Osaka, Japan	1 (3, 1)	104	2		
37	Mad Blankey/VerserK (Naruki Doi and Yamato)	June 13, 2015	Champion Gate 2015 in Hakata	Fukuoka, Japan	2 (6, 7)	267	9	Mad Blankey disbanded and their reign continued under the VerserK unit.	
38	Monster Express (T-Hawk and Big R Shimizu)	March 6, 2016	Champion Gate 2016 in Osaka	Osaka, Japan	1 (5, 1)	105	1		
39	Jimmyz (Jimmy Susumu and Jimmy Kagetora)	June 19, 2016	The Gate of Maximum 2016	Kyoto, Japan	3 (6, 3)	137	4		
40	Over Generation (Cima and Dragon Kid)	November 3, 2016	The Gate of Destiny 2016	Osaka, Japan	1 (5, 3)	397	9		
—	Vacated	December 5, 2017	Fantastic Gate 2017	Tokyo, Japan	—	—	—	Title vacated when Masaaki Mochizuki, Don Fujii and Cima were defeated by T-Hawk, Eita and El Lindaman in a six-man tag team match with the stipulation that Cima and Dragon Kid had to vacate the title if Cima's team lost.	
41	VerserK/Antias (T-Hawk and Eita)	December 23, 2017	The Final Gate 2017	Fukuoka, Japan	4 (6, 4)	134	2	Defeated Cima and Susumu Yokosuka to win the vacant titles.	
42	MaxiMuM (Big R Shimizu and Ben-K)	May 6, 2018	Dead or Alive 2018	Nagoya, Japan	1 (2, 1)	77	1		
43	Tribe Vanguard (Yamato and B×B Hulk)	July 22, 2018	Kobe Pro-Wrestling Festival 2018	Kobe, Japan	1 (8, 5)	151	3		
—	Vacated	December 20, 2018	—	Tokyo, Japan	—	—	—	Title vacated after B×B Hulk suffered a neck injury.	
44	R.E.D./Big Ben (Big R Shimizu and Ben-K)	December 23, 2018	The Final Gate 2018	Fukuoka, Japan	2 (3, 2)	126	2	Defeated MaxiMuM (Naruki Doi and Masato Yoshino), MexaBlood (Bandido and Flamita) and Tribe Vanguard (Yamato and Kagetora) in a four-way elimination match to win the vacant championship.	
45	Tribe Vanguard (Yamato and Kai)	April 28, 2019	The Gate of Passion 2019	Fukuoka, Japan	1 (9, 1)	84	0	First defense ended in a no contest when R.E.D. interfered.	
46	R.E.D. (Eita and Big R Shimizu)	July 21, 2019	Kobe Pro-Wrestling Festival 2019	Kobe, Japan	1 (5, 4)	147	3	This was a three-way elimination match, also involving MaxiMuM (Naruki Doi and Kaito Ishida).	
47	Tribe Vanguard (Yamato and B×B Hulk)	December 15, 2019	The Final Gate 2019	Fukuoka, Japan	2 (10, 6)	6	0		
—	Vacated	December 21, 2019	—	Kyoto, Japan	—	—	—	Vacated when B×B Hulk betrayed Tribe Vanguard and left the unit.	
48	R.E.D. (B×B Hulk and Kazma Sakamoto)	January 15, 2020	Open The New Year Gate 2020	Tokyo, Japan	1 (7, 1)	200	1	Defeated Team Dragon Gate (Yamato and Ben-K) in a tournament final to win the vacant championship.	
49	Team Dragon Gate (Jason Lee and Kota Minoura)	August 2, 2020	Memorial Gate 2020 in Wakayama	Wakayama, Japan	1	104	2		
—	Vacated	November 14, 2020	—	—	—	—	—	Vacated when Jason Lee couldn't work due to a high fever.	
50	R.E.D. (B×B Hulk and Kai)	November 15, 2020	Kobe Pro-Wrestling Festival 2020	Kobe, Japan	1 (8, 2)	112	3	Defeated Team Dragon Gate (Yamato and Kota Minoura) to win the vacant title.	
51	Masaaki Mochizuki and Takashi Yoshida	March 7, 2021	Champion Gate 2021 in Osaka	Osaka, Japan	1 (3, 4)	59	1	Yoshida was previously known as Cyber Kong.	
52	R.E.D. (Kaito Ishida and Kazma Sakamoto)	May 5, 2021	Dead or Alive 2021	Aichi, Japan	1 (1, 2)	87	0		
53	Natural Vibes (Susumu Yokosuka and King Shimizu)	July 31, 2021	Kobe Pro-Wrestling Festival 2021	Kobe, Japan	1 (7, 5)	119	3	King Shimizu was previously known as Big R Shimizu.	
54	Naruki Doi and Takashi Yoshida	November 27, 2021	Gate of Origin 2021	Sendai, Japan	1 (7, 5)	29	0		
55	R.E.D. (SB Kento and H.Y.O)	December 26, 2021	The Final Gate 2021	Fukuoka, Japan	1	18	0		
56	D'Courage (Dragon Dia and Yuki Yoshioka)	January 13, 2022	Open the New Year Gate 2022: Final Burst Out! K-ness. Forever	Tokyo, Japan	1	112	3		
57	Z-Brats (Diamante and Shun Skywalker)	May 5, 2022	Dead or Alive 2022	Nagoya, Japan	1	86	1		
58	Kung Fu Masters (Jacky "Funky" Kamei and Jason Lee)	July 30, 2022	Kobe World 2022: Último Dragón Debut 35th Anniversary	Kobe, Japan	1 (1, 2)	51	0		
59	D'Courage (Dragon Dia and Madoka Kikuta)	September 19, 2022	Dangerous Gate 2022	Tokyo, Japan	1 (2, 1)	74	1		
60	Z-Brats (B×B Hulk and Kai)	December 2, 2022	Fantastic Gate 2022	Sapporo, Japan	2 (9, 3)	2	0	Hulk and Kai won the titles previously while being part of R.E.D.	
61	Natural Vibes (Kzy and Big Boss Shimizu)	December 4, 2022	Fantastic Gate 2022	Sapporo, Japan	1 (1, 6)	121	6		
62	Kongo (Kenoh and Shuji Kondo)	April 4, 2023	Buyuden Zero	Tokyo, Japan	1	59	1		
63	M3K (Susumu Mochizuki and Yasushi Kanda)	June 2, 2023	Rainbow Gate 2023	Tokyo, Japan	1 (8, 1)	156	3	Mochizuki was previously known as Susumu Yokosuka and Jimmy Susumu.	
64	D'Courage (Dragon Dia and Yuki Yoshioka)	November 5, 2023	The Gate of Destiny 2023	Osaka, Japan	2 (3, 2)	44	0		
—	Vacated	December 19, 2023	—	—	—	—	—	Vacated after Yoshioka was sidelined with a detached retina.	
65	Kaito Kiyomiya and Alejandro	December 24, 2023	The Final Gate 2023	Fukuoka, Japan	1	133	1	Defeated Gold Class (Kota Minoura and Ben-K) to win the vacant titles.	
66	Paradox (Dragon Kid and Naruki Doi)	May 5, 2024	Dead or Alive 2024	Nagoya, Japan	1 (4, 8)	182	2		
67	Natural Vibes (Flamita and Kzy)	November 3, 2024	Gate of Destiny 2024	Osaka, Japan	1 (1, 2)	42	0		
68	Z-Brats (Jason Lee and Kota Minoura)	December 15, 2024	Final Gate 2024	Fukuoka, Japan	2 (3, 2)	245	3	Lee and Minoura previously won the titles as Team Dragon Gate.	
69	D'Courage (Dragon Dia and Yuki Yoshioka)	August 17, 2025	DG Dangerous Gate 2025	Tokyo, Japan	3 (4, 3)	78	1		
70	Love And Peace (Jacky Kamei and Riiita)	November 3, 2025	The Gate of Destiny 2025	Osaka, Japan	1 (2, 1)	201	3		
71	Gajadokuro (Ishin and Yoshiki Kato)	May 23, 2026	Hopeful Gate 2026	Sapporo, Japan	1	176	2	This was also contested for Kamei and Riiita's Sou Ryuo Tag Team Championship.	
72	Paradox (Kagetora and Susumu Yokosuka)	November 15, 2026	The Gate Of Evolution 2026	Yokosuka, Japan	4 (4, 9)	0+	0	Kagetora and Yokosuka previously won the titles as Jimmyz (Jimmy Kagetora and Jimmy Susumu).	

== Combined reigns ==
As of November 15, 2026.

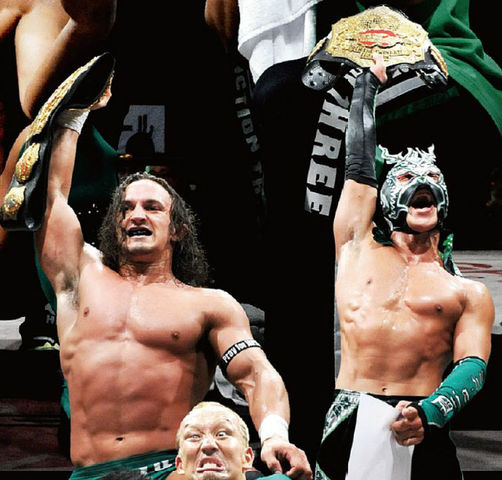
Former champions Junction Three (Dragon Kid and Pac) with the titles in 2011.

†	Indicates the current champions

=== By team ===
Rank	Team	No. of reigns	Combined defenses	Combined days
1	Over Generation (Cima and Dragon Kid)	1	9	397
2	Team Dragon Gate/Z-Brats (Jason Lee and Kota Minoura)	2	5	349
3	Antias/Millennials/VerserK (T-Hawk and Eita)	4	4	299
4	Mad Blankey/VerserK (Naruki Doi and Yamato)	2	9	281
5	Jimmyz/Paradox † (Jimmy Kagetora/Kagetora and Jimmy Susumu/Susumu Yokosuka)	4	7	270+
6	Blood Warriors/Real Hazard (Genki Horiguchi and Ryo Saito)	2	5	268
7	D'Courage (Dragon Dia and Yuki Yoshioka)	2	4	234
8	Mad Blankey/Real Hazard (Cyber Kong and Yamato)	2	6	210
8	Monster Express (Akira Tozawa and Shingo Takagi)	1	5	210
10	Akatsuki (Shingo Takagi and Yamato)	3	5	205
11	MaxiMuM/R.E.D. (Big R Shimizu and Ben-K)	2	3	203
12	Love And Peace (Jacky Kamei and Riiita)	1	3	201
13	R.E.D. (B×B Hulk and Kazma Sakamoto)	1	1	200
14	K-neSuka (K-ness. and Susumu Yokosuka)	1	4	194
15	Team Veteran Returns (Don Fujii and Masaaki Mochizuki)	2	6	187
16	Paradox (Dragon Kid and Naruki Doi)	1	2	182
17	Gajadokuro (Ishin and Yoshiki Kato)	1	2	176
18	Tribe Vanguard (B×B Hulk and Yamato)	2	3	157
19	M3K (Susumu Mochizuki and Yasushi Kanda)	1	3	156
20	R.E.D. (Big R Shimizu and Eita)	1	3	147
21	Typhoon (Ryo Saito and Susumu Yokosuka)	1	3	144
22	Blood Warriors (Cima and Ricochet)	1	3	136
23	Alejandro and Kaito Kiyomiya	1	1	133
24	Blood Warriors/Mad Blankey (Akira Tozawa and B×B Hulk)	2	2	130
25	Muscle Outlaw'z/World-1 (Masato Yoshino and Naruki Doi)	2	2	128
26	Natural Vibes (Big Boss Shimizu and Kzy)	1	6	121
27	Natural Vibes (Susumu Yokosuka and King Shimizu)	1	3	119
28	R.E.D./Z-Brats (Kai and B×B Hulk)	2	3	114
29	Monster Express (Big R Shimizu and T-Hawk)	1	1	105
30	Monster Express (Masato Yoshino and Shachihoko Boy)	1	2	104
31	Tozawa-juku (Kenichiro Arai and Taku Iwasa)	1	2	87
31	R.E.D. (Kaito Ishida and Kazma Sakamoto)	1	0	87
33	Z-Brats (Shun Skywalker and Diamante)	1	1	86
34	Tribe Vanguard (Kai and Yamato)	1	0	84
35	D'Courage (Dragon Dia and Madoka Kikuta)	1	1	74
36	Osaka06/Warriors-5 (Cima and Gamma)	3	0	71
37	Warriors-5 (Gamma and Susumu Yokosuka)	1	1	65
38	Mad Blankey (B×B Hulk and Uhaa Nation)	1	1	64
39	Kongo (Kenoh and Shuji Kondo)	1	1	59
39	Masaaki Mochizuki and Takashi Yoshida	1	1	59
41	Kamikaze (Cyber Kong and Shingo Takagi)	1	1	52
42	Kung Fu Masters (Jason Lee and Jacky "Funky" Kamei)	1	0	51
43	Gamma and Naruki Doi	1	1	48
44	Natural Vibes (Flamita and Kzy)	1	0	42
45	World-1 International (Naruki Doi and Ricochet)	1	0	40
46	Naruki Doi and Takashi Yoshida	1	0	29
47	Junction Three (Dragon Kid and Pac)	1	0	28
48	R.E.D. (SB Kento and H.Y.O)	1	0	18
49	We Are Team Veteran (Dragon Kid and K-ness.)	1	0	8
50	Mad Blankey (BxB Hulk and Naoki Tanisaki)	1	0	7

=== By wrestler ===
Rank	Wrestler	No. of reigns	Combined defenses	Combined days
1	Susumu Yokosuka/Susumu Mochizuki/Jimmy Susumu †	9	21	948+
2	Yamato	10	21	937
3	Naruki Doi	8	14	708
4	Big R Shimizu/Big Boss Shimizu/King Shimizu	6	16	695
5	BxB Hulk	9	10	672
6	Dragon Kid	4	11	615
7	Cima	5	12	604
8	Shingo Takagi	5	11	467
9	Eita	5	7	446
10	Ryo Saito	3	8	412
11	T-Hawk/"Naoki Tanizaki"	6	5	411
12	Jason Lee	3	5	400
13	Cyber Kong/Takashi Yoshida	5	6	350
14	Kota Minoura	2	5	349
15	Akira Tozawa	3	7	340
16	Dragon Dia	4	5	308
17	Kazma Sakamoto	2	1	287
18	Jimmy Kagetora/Kagetora †	4	7	270+
19	Genki Horiguchi	2	5	268
20	Jacky "Funky" Kamei	2	3	252
21	Masaaki Mochizuki	3	7	246
22	Yuki Yoshioka	3	4	234
23	Masato Yoshino	3	4	232
24	K-ness	2	4	204
25	Ben-K	2	3	203
26	Riiita	1	3	201
27	Kai	3	3	198
28	Don Fujii	2	6	187
29	Gamma	5	2	184
30	Ricochet	2	3	176
31	Ishin	1	2	176
31	Yoshiki Kato	1	2	176
33	Kzy	2	6	163
34	Yasushi Kanda	1	3	156
35	Alejandro	1	1	133
35	Kaito Kiyomiya	1	1	133
37	Shachihoko Boy	1	2	104
38	Kenichiro Arai	1	1	87
38	Taku Iwasa	1	1	87
38	Kaito Ishida	1	0	87
41	Shun Skywalker	1	1	86
41	Diamante	1	1	86
43	Madoka Kikuta	1	1	74
44	Uhaa Nation	1	1	64
45	Kenoh	1	1	59
45	Shuji Kondo	1	1	59
47	Flamita	1	0	42
48	Pac	1	0	28
49	SB Kento	1	0	18
49	H.Y.O	1	0	18

== See also ==
- Open the United Gate Championship
