= Cyber Kong =

Japanese professional wrestler

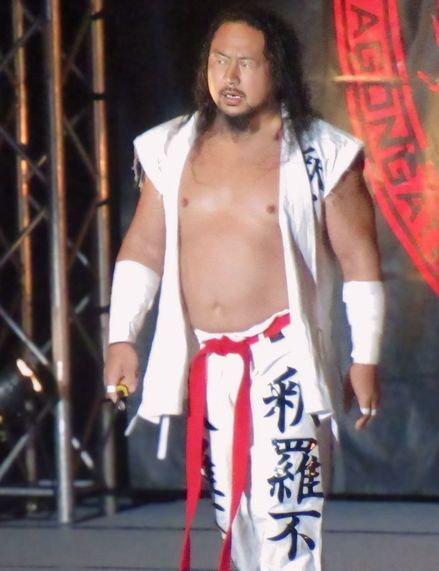
- Yoshida in 2024

Personal information
- Born: Takashi Yoshida (吉田 隆司, Yoshida Takashi); July 3, 1982 (age 44) Osaka, Osaka Prefecture, Japan

Professional wrestling career
- Ring name(s): Cyber Kong; Takashi Yoshida
- Billed height: 1.78 m (5 ft 10 in)
- Billed weight: 120 kg (260 lb)
- Trained by: Dragon Gate Dojo
- Debut: December 13, 2004

Takashi Yoshida (吉田 隆司, Yoshida Takashi; born July 3, 1982 in Osaka, Japan), also known by his former stage name Cyber Kong (サイバー・コング, Saibā Kongu), is a Japanese professional wrestler currently wrestling for Dragongate under his real name.

== Professional wrestling career ==
Cyber Kong's career started in 2006. He competed as an arm wrestler and was part of the New Japan Dojo system. He trained in the Los Angeles-based Inoki Dojo, but his short stature prevented him from getting far in it, so he took a tryout at the Dragon Gate USA dojo and became its first graduate. During this time, he aligned himself with Shingo Takagi, representing Dragon Gate USA in Ring of Honor's sister company Full Impact Pro. He came to Japan in November, and he became part of the NEX class.

His frightening power, wrestling abilities, and muscular build made him nearly unbeatable in NEX, and thus he was soon brought up to the main roster, where he continued to be a major threat (however, he has shown himself to be susceptible to flash pins). One of his trademarks before and during his matches is ripping a pineapple in half with his bare hands and then chewing up and spitting out the fruit in a savage manner.

He was thought to be an American wrestler originally but was later outed as being Japanese by Masaaki Mochizuki, when he told Yoshida to "wake up." In early 2007, he joined the Muscle Outlaw'z faction, tagging with gaijin Babi Slymm - known as Cyber Gang - as the Ultimate Cybers. His stay in the faction would not be a very long one, for he would soon turn on the Muscle Outlaw'z and start the New Hazard faction with BxB Hulk, who had turned on the Typhoon faction at the same time, and Shingo Takagi. On May 14, 2008, he and Takagi turned on BxB Hulk and joined up with the heel half of the Muscle Outlaw'z, renaming the group to Real Hazard. On July 10, tensions between him and Takagi started up after Takagi prevented him and the other members of Real Hazard (as well as Tokyo Gurentai) from giving Cima an unwanted haircut, which eventually led to Takagi's dismissal from the group seventeen days later. He fought Takagi for his Open the Dream Gate Championship on August 31, but he was unsuccessful in capturing the title.

On October 5, he and Yamato would win the Open the Twin Gate Titles from Naruki Doi & Masato Yoshino. On December 21, he did battle with Naoki Tanizaki in a Mask vs. Hair match, which he initially lost after his stablemate Cyber Kongcito's attempt to interfere on his behalf backfired. Real Hazard would come out to protest the result, but he said he would own up to the mask stipulation - except that it would be Kongcito's mask, not his. Kongcito was unmasked, beaten up, and kicked out of the group. He then demanded a restart, due to Kongcito's intrusion, and Cima came out, appointed the special referee, and agreed to let the match restart, since both Real Hazard and WORLD-1 (Tanisaki's stable) had intruded in the match. Kong won, and Tanizaki lost his hair.

He then got into a feud with Anthony W. Mori, with each one gaining victories over the other until they agreed to settle their feud in a Hair vs. Mask Match on March 22. On March 1, he and Yamato would lose the Open the Twin Gate titles to Susumu Yokosuka & Gamma after stablemate Kagetora interfered and turned on them. On March 22, 2009 his match with Mori initially ended in a no-contest after Real Hazard intruded. He and the rest of the group went after Mori's hair, but Masaaki Mochizuki and Don Fujii stopped them. The match was restarted, and Kong won the match decisively, so Mori lost his hair.

On October 23, he sustained a neck injury during training. It was apparently a severe injury, and it also wasn't healing properly. On November 15, feeling that he would not be able to appear or perform at a satisfactory level once he returned from the injury, he submitted his resignation to Dragon Gate.

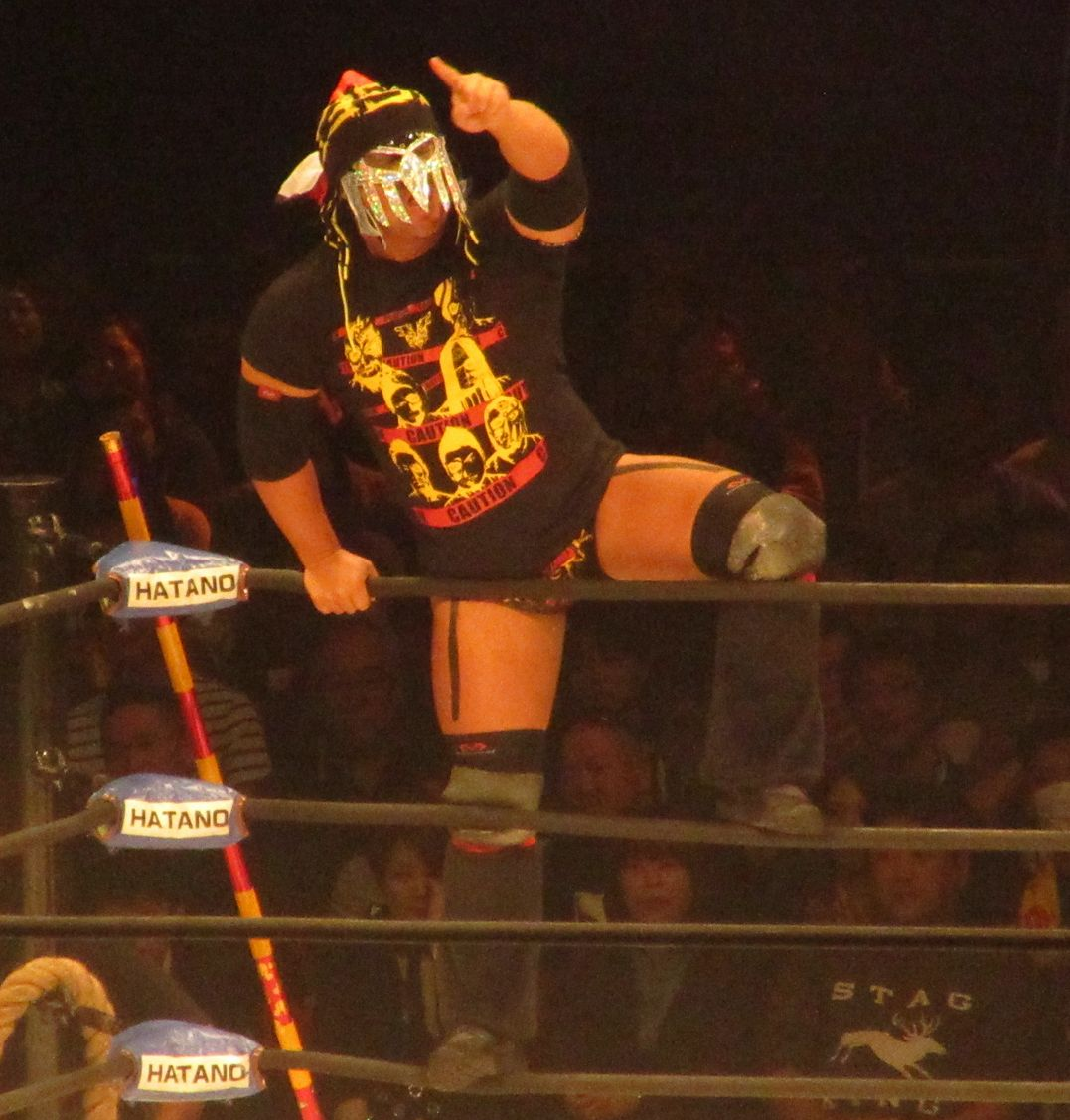
Yoshida as Cyber Kong in November 2016

However, on February 7, 2010, Takagi called him out after winning a match, and he surprisingly appeared. He appealed to President Okamura to be reinstated, and was welcomed back, joining Takagi's unit Kamikaze. On March 22, Kong and Takagi defeated Cima and Gamma to win the Open the Twin Gate Championship. They would lose the title two months later. On May 13, 2011, Takagi disbanded Kamikaze. Instead of following Takagi and Yamato to Masaaki Mochizuki's face group, Kong decided to instead join Cima's heel group, Blood Warriors. On October 16, Kong defeated former partner Yamato in a six-way steel cage Hair vs. Hair match, forcing him to have his head shaved. On November 4, 2011, Blood Warriors faced Junction Three in a ten-man tag team match with the stipulation that the loser of the fall had to leave his unit. In the end, Yamato won the match for Junction Three by submitting Kong with a sleeper hold, who was then kicked out of Blood Warriors. Kong rejoined Blood Warriors on January 19, 2012, helping Akira Tozawa and BxB Hulk turn on Cima and kick him out of the group. On March 1, the new leader of Blood Warriors, Akira Tozawa, changed the stable's name to Mad Blankey.

In 2012 shortly after joining Mad Blankey, Kong was abruptly demoted to the level of jobber to the stars. He rarely won matches, and often cost Mad Blankey matches due to inept attempts at interfering on their behalf. After a failed challenge at the Open the Twin Gate Championship on December 23, 2012, Kong was kicked out of Mad Blankey. He returned to Mad Blankey on August 30, 2013, after Yamato had taken over as the new leader of the group. On October 6, Kong, BxB Hulk and Yamato won the vacant Open the Triangle Gate Championship by defeating Akira Tozawa, Masato Yoshino and Shingo Takagi. They lost the title to Millennials (Eita, Flamita and T-Hawk) on December 5. On August 16, 2015, Mad Blankey was forced to disband after losing to Jimmyz in a five-on-five elimination tag team match, after being betrayed by K-ness. On September 23, Kong formed a new stable named VerserK with Kotoka, Mondai Ryu, Naruki Doi, Shingo Takagi and Yamato.

On May 5, 2017, Cyber Kong was forced to unmask and reveal his real name, after losing to Open the Dream Gate Champion Yamato in a five-way steel cage match. He later became part of R.E.D stable.

== Championships and accomplishments ==
- All Japan Pro Wrestling
  - Gaora TV Championship (1 time)
  - AJPW TV Six-Man Tag Team Championship (1 time) — with Hokuto Omori and Kuma Arashi
- Dragon Gate
  - Open the Triangle Gate Championship (10 times) – with BxB Hulk and Shingo Takagi (2), BxB Hulk and Yamato (1), Kzy and Naruki Doi (1), T-Hawk and Shingo Takagi (1), El Lindaman and Shingo Takagi (1), Kazma Sakamoto and Yasushi Kanda (1), H.Y.O and Diamante (1), Diamante and Kazma Sakamoto (1) and SB Kento and Kazma Sakamoto (1)
  - Open the Twin Gate Championship (4 times) – with Yamato (2), Shingo Takagi (1) and Masaaki Mochizuki (1)
  - Open the Owarai Gate Championship (1 time)
  - Open the Twin Gate #1 Contender's One Night Tournament (2012) – with Naoki Tanizaki
- Osaka Pro Wrestling
  - Osaka Tag Team Championship (1 time) — with Magnitude Kishiwada
- Ryukyu Dragon Pro Wrestling
  - Gasakae Tournament (2022)

=== Luchas de Apuestas record ===
Winner (wager)	Loser (wager)	Location	Event	Date	Notes
Cyber Kong (mask)	Naoki Tanizaki (hair)	Kobe, Japan	Live event	December 21, 2008	
Cyber Kong (mask)	Anthony W. Mori (hair)	Tokyo, Japan	Live event	March 22, 2009	
Cyber Kong (mask)	Yamato (hair)	Osaka, Japan	Gate of Destiny	October 16, 2011	(Note: This was a six-way steel cage match, also involving Akira Tozawa, BxB Hulk, Kagetora and Shingo Takagi.)
Yamato (Open the Dream Gate Championship)	Cyber Kong (mask)	Nagoya, Japan	Dead or Alive 2017	May 5, 2017	(Note: This was a five-way steel cage match, also involving BxB Hulk, Naruki Doi and Shingo Takagi, who wagered their hair.)
