= Makoto Saitō (wrestler) =

Japanese professional wrestler

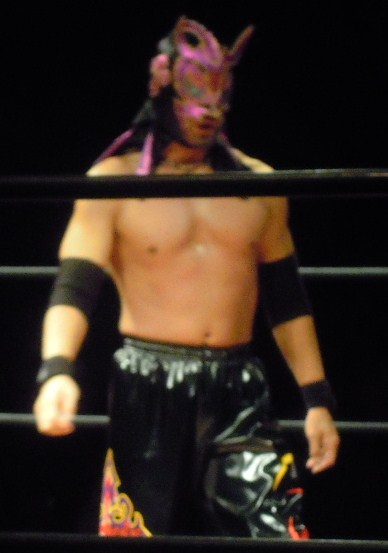
- Saitō as K-ness. in 2011

Personal information
- Born: April 16, 1974 (age 52) Nerima, Tokyo, Japan

Professional wrestling career
- Ring names: Darkness Dragon; Jimmy K-ness J.K.S.; K-ness.; Makoto; Sumo K-ness S.K.S; Turbo-ness
- Billed height: 1.72 m (5 ft 8 in)
- Billed weight: 74 kg (163 lb)
- Trained by: Animal Hamaguchi; Wrestle Yume Factory; Último Dragón
- Debut: April 23, 1996
- Retired: April 7, 2022

Makoto Saitō (斎藤 誠, Saitō Makoto; born April 16, 1974 in Nerima, Tokyo, Japan), better known by his ring name K-ness (stylized with a period as K-ness. and read as Kunesu (クネス)), is a Japanese retired professional wrestler. He is best known for his 23-year tenure with Toryumon and later Dragon Gate, where he was NWA World Welterweight Champion, Open the Brave Gate Champion, two-time Open the Twin Gate Champion and three-time Open the Triangle Gate Champion.

He was also known under the ring name Jimmy K-ness J.K.S. (ジミー・クネスJ.K.S., Jimī Kunesu Jē Kē Esu) while he was part of the Jimmyz stable.

== Career ==
=== Early years ===
Saitō debuted in Michinoku Pro Wrestling around the same time as Yoshito Sugamoto, and then went on to wrestle on the Japanese independent circuit.

=== Toryumon ===
He joined Tōryūmon in 1999 as Makoto, with a vampire style gimmick. As Makoto he was a member of the legendary Crazy Max stable. However, he did not get along with Taru, and eventually was kicked out of the stable after losing to Taru in a loser leaves match.

He returned to Tōryūmon as Darkness Dragon, a takeoff on the Último Dragón lineage, joining heel stable M2K. With the help of his stablemates he became a main event performer. He had a bitter feud with Dragon Kid that ended in 2002 with Kid winning the feud after winning a best of 3 falls mask vs mask match. Darkness Dragon unmasked and briefly went face, forming a face stable called Do Fixer with Kid and Ryo Saito. His face turn, however, was a ruse designed to cause dissention between the faces. He would soon turn heel again, joining the remnants of M2K and revealing that they were the real Do Fixer. He remasked and reinvented himself as K-ness., and engaged in a major feud and rivalry with Yossino.

In November 2003 he suffered a major shoulder injury which caused him to miss out on the majority of 2004, and the switch from Tōryūmon to Dragon Gate.

=== Dragon Gate ===
By the time K-ness returned, Último Dragón had left the promotion and taken the Tōryūmon trademark with him.

On returning, K-ness re-united members from the various M2K factions that had split up over the past few years and created Final M2K. He had a relatively quiet 2005. He faced long term rival Yossino for the Open the Brave Gate Championship, but was defeated.

In 2006, he spent a lot of time on the shelf again, recovering from nagging injuries. When he returned at the end of the year, he was no longer himself in terms of his health, and began to wrestle in the opening matches on Dragon Gate cards to reduce the possibility of re-injuring himself. He then held an office position as field manager and booker.

In late 2007 he began to take matches in the upper card again. Teaming with Masaaki Mochizuki and Don Fujii, he ended up with a reign as one third of the Open the Triangle Gate champions. After dropping the titles, K-ness primarily returned to his background role. During that time, he unofficially allied with the "Over 30" veterans of Mochizuki, Fujii and Magnitude Kishiwada, and occasionally took upper card matches with them.

In 2009, K-ness began wrestling as 'X' although no one knew who exactly X was. Genki Horiguchi eventually called out X, who turned out to be K-ness. He stopped teaming with the other veterans and joined Real Hazard, reuniting the K-neSuka team with Susumu Yokosuka. On January 11, 2010, he defeated Naoki Tanizaki to become the Open the Brave Gate Champion.

On January 10, 2010, Genki Horiguchi announced that Real Hazard would start winning matches through teamwork rather than illegal tactics. He initially started out alone on this mission, but six days later, Yokosuka and K-ness decided to help him in his pursuit of clean fights. However, they all found themselves on the losing end of trios matches, with Horiguchi taking the fall every time, and a divide formed in Real Hazard over the clean fights issue, with them on one side and Yasushi Kanda, Kzy, and Takuya Sugawara – who wanted to win through illegal methods – on the other. On February 10, after Kagetora accidentally cost Sugawara a shot at becoming the next challenger for the Open the Dream Gate Championship, tensions boiled over. Yokosuka and K-ness left Real Hazard, along with Horiguchi. K-neSuka also agreed to stop teaming with Horiguchi, since they all did not like how Horiguchi was losing constantly, and they all felt that that was preventing K-neSuka from getting to the top of the tag team division.

On February 27, K-ness dropped the Brave Gate title to Super Shisa. On May 13, 2010, K-ness and Susumu Yokosuka defeated Cyber Kong and Shingo Takagi to win the Dragon Gate Open the Twin Gate Championship. After the longest reign in the title's history, with four successful defenses, K-ness and Yokosuka lost the Open the Twin Gate Championship to Gamma and Naruki Doi on November 23, 2010. On December 4, K-ness and Susumu Yokosuka joined World-1. In a match on February 6, 2011, K-ness suffered a dislocated right shoulder and took time off to heal. On April 14, 2011, World-1 was forced to disband after losing a match to the Blood Warriors. On September 9, 2015, upon joining the Jimmyz stable, he was renamed Jimmy K-ness J.K.S. On September 18, 2017, the Jimmyz were forced to disband after losing a match to VerserK.

In December 2021, K-ness announced that he would be retiring in April 2022 due to a lingering neck injury.

== Championships and accomplishments ==
- Dragon Gate

- Open the Brave Gate Championship (1 time)
- Open the Triangle Gate Championship (3 times) – with Masaaki Mochizuki and Don Fujii (1), Jimmy Susumu and Masaaki Mochizuki (1) and Dragon Kid and Masaaki Mochizuki (1)
- Open the Twin Gate Championship (2 times) – with Susumu Yokosuka (1) and Dragon Kid (1)
- Summer Adventure Tag League (2015) – with Jimmy Susumu

- Toryumon Japan

- NWA World Welterweight Championship (1 time)
- UWA World Trios Championship (2 times) – with Susumu Mochizuki and Yasushi Kanda (1) and Masaaki Mochizuki and Susumu Mochizuki (1)
