= Kzy =

Japanese professional wrestler

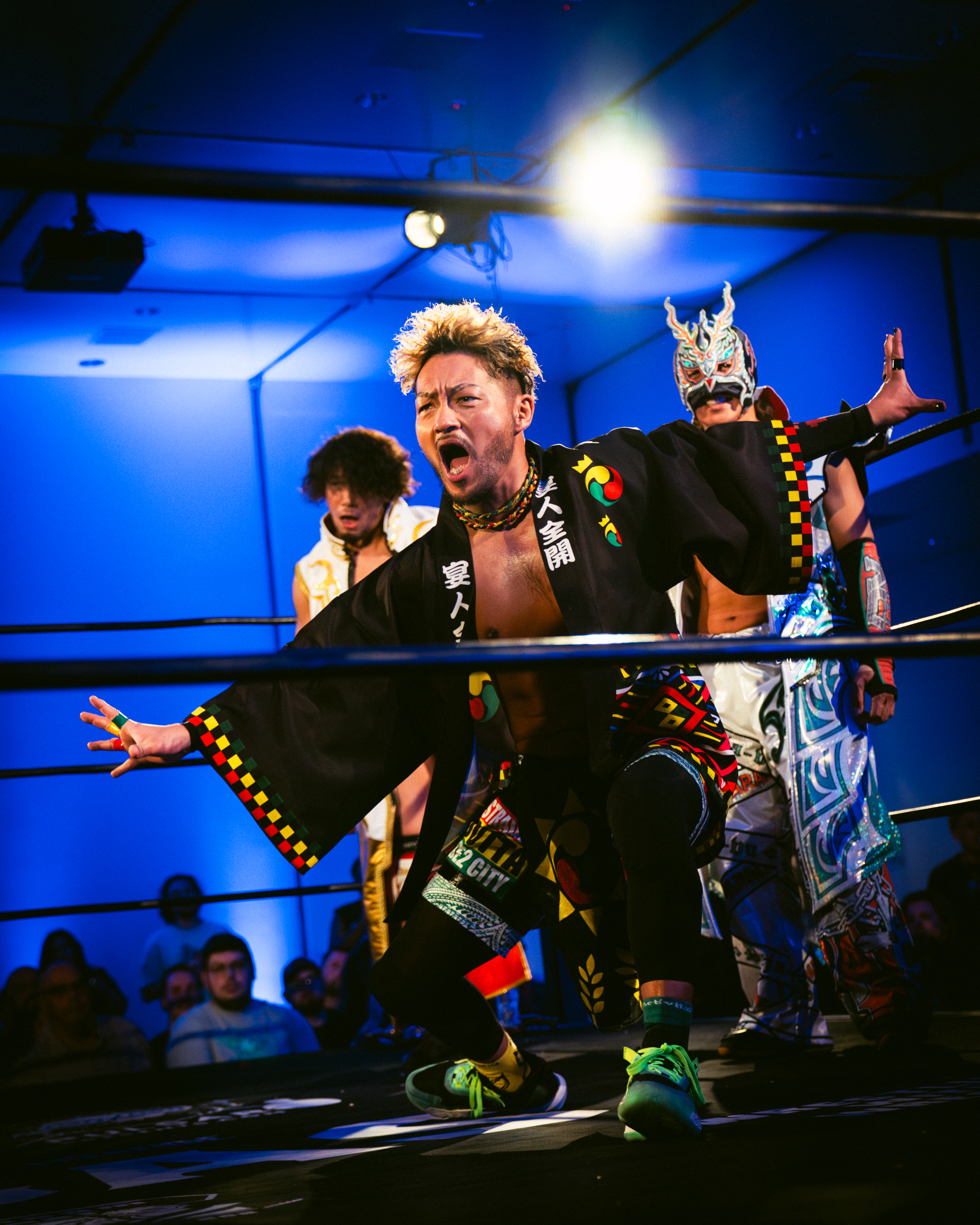
- Kzy in April 2025

Personal information
- Born: Kazuki Sawada (澤田 和希, Sawada Kazuki); June 26, 1986 (age 40) Ebetsu, Hokkaido

Professional wrestling career
- Ring name(s): Dr. Muscle; Kzy m.c.KZ; Tomahawk Kzy
- Billed height: 1.72 m (5 ft 7 1/2 in)
- Billed weight: 75 kg (165 lb)
- Trained by: Dragon Gate Dojo; Masato Yoshino
- Debut: December 9, 2006

Kazuki Sawada (澤田 和希, Sawada Kazuki) (born June 26, 1986), better known by his ring name Kzy (ケーズィー Kēzī /keɪzjiː/ kay-zee), is a Japanese professional wrestler. He is signed to Dragon Gate.

Trained in the Dragon Gate dojo, Kzy initially debuted in 2006 as m.c.KZ, with the gimmick of a rapper who rapped his own theme song and wore ring attire heavily influenced by American hip-hop culture. In 2009, he changed his ring name to simply Kzy, the name he uses to this day. He is a one-time Open the Brave Gate Champion and six time Open the Triangle Gate Champion, as well as the King of Gate 2021 winner.

== Career ==
=== Dragon Gate (2006–present) ===
During 2006, he debuted during some Dragon Gate NEX shows as m.c.KZ. His gimmick was that of a rapper, and he rapped his own theme song on his way to the ring. In 2007, he and Lupin Matsutani, another wrestler on the Dragon Gate NEX circuit, teamed together as Lupin the KZ. When BxB Hulk and YAMATO became injured before the inaugural Summer Adventure Tag League Tournament, Lupin the KZ were chosen to replace the New Hazard team. Later in the year, he managed to pull out a win against CIMA on a NEX show. CIMA had previously injured his neck and was advised not to wrestle, but did it anyway as a way to put over the young wrestler.

At the start of 2008, he won the NEX-1 tournament, and after completing a five match trial series, he departed for Mexico to hone his skills. In June, he received a phone call from Naruki Doi inviting him to join his WORLD-1 faction, and he accepted. Despite getting a push when he first returned, culminating in a chance at winning the vacant Open the Brave Gate Championship, he soon fell into a horrific slump, getting pinned or tapping out during tag team or six-man tag matches that he was involved in. He also appeared once for Chikara in the U.S. during their King of Trios tournament that year, beating Michael Nakazawa in a singles match on the third night of the event.

He slightly improved in 2009, but still remained the lowest ranking member of WORLD-1. On June 26, he officially quit WORLD-1 and joined up with heel stable Real Hazard, after helping Ryo Saito and Genki Horiguchi retain their Open the Twin Gate Titles against CIMA and Gamma under the Dr. Muscle disguise and unmasking after the match. The next night, he changed his name to Kzy (pronounced "kay-zee") and debuted a completely new look.

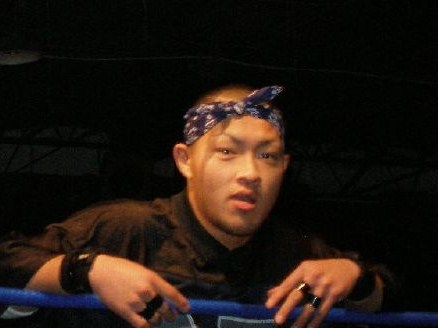
Kzy in February 2008

On January 10, 2010, when stablemate Genki Horiguchi announced that Real Hazard would be winning more matches through teamwork rather than illegal methods and Yasushi Kanda was against this idea, Kzy - along with Takuya Sugawara - sided with Kanda in the matter. The issue eventually caused a divide in Real Hazard, with them on one side and Horiguchi, Susumu Yokosuka & K-ness on the other. In the midst of this, KAGETORA - who had rejoined Real Hazard a very short time ago - began to resent rejoining their ranks. A match was set for February 11 between Kzy and KAGETORA, where the loser would be kicked out of Real Hazard, and Kzy emerged victorious. The day before, Horiguchi, Yokosuka & K-ness left Real Hazard, and a couple of weeks later, he and the others in the stable retired the Real Hazard name and began calling their unit Deep Drunkers. On October 13, 2010, the Deep Drunkers were forced to split up, after losing a match against WORLD-1 (BxB Hulk, Masato Yoshino and Naruki Doi), but after the match Doi turned on WORLD-1 to form a new stable with Kzy, Kanda Naoki Tanizaki and Takuya Sugawara. In December 2010 Kzy was sidelined with a leg injury. Meanwhile, his new stable merged themselves with CIMA's Warriors stable, forming a new top heel faction. On January 18 the new group was named Blood Warriors. Kzy made his return on May 27, 2011, when he was revealed as the newest member of Blood Warriors and the replacement for Gamma, who had just been kicked out of the group. On September 2, Kzy, Naoki Tanizaki and Naruki Doi defeated Gamma, Masato Yoshino and YAMATO to win the Dragon Gate Open the Triangle Gate Championship. They were stripped of the title on January 19, 2012, after Tanizaki was sidelined for six months with a shoulder injury. On March 1, the new leader of Blood Warriors, Akira Tozawa, changed the stable's name to Mad Blankey. On March 25, 2012, Kzy unsuccessfully challenged Ricochet for the Open the Brave Gate Championship. On December 9, Kzy, impostor Naoki Tanizaki and BxB Hulk unsuccessfully challenged Genki Horiguchi H.A.Gee.Mee!!, Ryo "Jimmy" Saito and Mr. Quu Quu Toyonaka Dolphin for the Dragon Gate Open the Triangle gate championship. On April 12, 2013, Kzy unsuccessfully challenged Dragon Kid for the Open the Brave Gate championship. On May 5, Kzy, Mondai Ryu and Uhaa Nation unsuccessfully challenged for the Open the Triangle Gate Championship in a 3-way 6-man tag match with Kzy getting his team eliminated by getting pinned by Dragon Kid. On September 29, Kzy challenged for the vacant Open the Brave Gate championship in a losing effort to Genki Horiguchi H.A.Gee.Mee!!. On February 20, 2014, Kzy, Naruki Doi and Cyber Kong challenged for the vacant Open the Triangle Gate championship in a losing effort to Jimmy Susumu, Yasushi Kanda and Mr. Kyu Kyu Tanizaki Naoki Toyonaka Dolphin. On May 5, at Dragon Gate's Dead or Alive event Kzy was represented by Naruki Doi in a Lucha de Apuesta style cage match where if you don't get a flag the person your representing for gets their head shaved, Doi didn't capture a flag so Kzy had to get his head shaved. On June 6, Kzy, Naruki Doi and Cyber Kong won the Open the Triangle gate championship in a 3-way 6-Man Tag match with Kzy pinning U-T after hitting his finisher Impact. On September 9 Kzy unsuccessfully challenged Flamita for the Open the Brave Gate championship. Kzy, Naruki Doi and Cyber Kong defended the triangle belts 3 times before losing the belts on October 9, to CIMA, Gamma and Don Fujii after Gamma hit Kzy with the Skytwister press. After losing the Triangle Belt Kzy was sidelined with an eye injury.

On January 12, 2015, Kzy, as the masked Dr. Muscle, defeated Eita in the finals of a tournament to win the vacant Open the Brave Gate Championship. He unmasked four days later, betraying Mad Blankey and jumping to Dia.Hearts. On February 28, Kzy lost the Open the Brave Gate Championship to Akira Tozawa. On February 4, 2016, Dia.HEARTS was forced to disband after he took the final fall in an elimination match which also included Monster Express and VerserK. On May 28, Kzy, along with BxB Hulk, YAMATO, and Yosuke♥Santa Maria, formed a new unit named Tribe Vanguard.

In February 2018, Kzy announced his departure from Tribe Vanguard after unsuccessfully challenging Masaaki Mochizuki for the Open the Dream Gate Championship. With support from Genki Horiguchi and Susumu Yokosuka, he established a new unit, Natural Vibes, which debuted under that name on May 3. The group disbanded in late 2019 before Kzy announced its reunion on December 27, 2020.

In June 2021, Kzy won the King of Gate tournament for the first time, defeating KAI in the final after advancing through the losers' bracket. The victory earned him a challenge for the Dream Gate Championship at Kobe Pro-Wrestling Festival 2021, where he unsuccessfully challenged Shun Skywalker.

In 2022, Kzy, U-T and JACKY KAMEI won the Open the Triangle Gate Championship on February 20, defeating High-End and a team from Z-Brats in a tournament final. Later that year, Kzy and BIGBOSS Shimizu won the Open the Twin Gate Championship on December 4. On December 23, Kzy teamed with YO-HEY to defeat Atsushi Kotoge and Seiki Yoshioka for the GHC Junior Heavyweight Tag Team Championship in Pro Wrestling Noah, making him a triple crown tag team champion.

In May 2023, Kzy and Shimizu teamed with Kamei to win the Triangle Gate Championship. They lost the titles in July to Gold Class. In October, Kzy defeated ISHIN to win the Brave Gate Championship for the second time, but lost it back to ISHIN five days later.

In May 2024, Kzy stepped down as Natural Vibes' leader and appointed Strong Machine J as his successor. The group subsequently regained the Triangle Gate Championship, with Strong Machine J, BIGBOSS Shimizu and U-T defeating Z-Brats on May 9.

On May 5, 2025, Kzy teamed with Flamita and Strong Machine J to defeat Paradox for the Triangle Gate Championship at Dead or Alive 2025.

In February 2026, Kzy teamed with Natural Vibes newcomers @KEY and GuC to win the Triangle Gate Championship. The trio lost the titles in May. As part of Natural Vibes' 20th-anniversary celebrations for Kzy's wrestling career, he proposed a match between past and present members of the unit in June. On July 2, Kzy defeated YAMATO to win a tournament for the next Dream Gate Championship challenger. On July 20 at Kobe Pro-Wrestling Festival 2026, Kzy defeated Madoka Kikuta to win the Dream Gate Championship for the first time, finally capturing the title after several previous unsuccessful challenges. He successfully defended it against YAMATO on September 12 before losing it to Yoshiki Kato on October 2.

== Championships and accomplishments ==
- Dragon Gate
  - Open the Dream Gate Championship (1 time)
  - Open the Brave Gate Championship (2 times)
  - Open the Triangle Gate Championship (10 times) – with Takuya Sugawara and Yasushi Kanda (1), Naoki Tanizaki and Naruki Doi (1), Cyber Kong and Naruki Doi (1), BxB Hulk and YAMATO (1), Genki Horiguchi and Susumu Yokosuka (2), U-T and Jacky "Funky" Kamei (1), Big Boss Shimizu and Jacky "Funky" Kamei (1), Flamita and Strong Machine J (1) and GuC and Key (1)
  - Open the Twin Gate Championship (2 times) – with Big Boss Shimizu (1) and Flamita (1)
  - King of Gate (2021)
  - NEX-1 Tournament (2008)
- Pro Wrestling Illustrated
  - Ranked No. 130 of the top 500 singles wrestlers in the PWI 500 in 2021
- Pro Wrestling NOAH
  - GHC Junior Heavyweight Tag Team Championship (1 time) - with Yo-Hey
- Ryukyu Dragon Pro Wrestling
  - Sou Ryuo Tag Team Championship (1 time) - with U-T

=== Luchas de Apuestas record ===
Winner (wager)	Loser (wager)	Location	Event	Date	Notes
Kzy (hair)	Kotoka (hair)	Sapporo, Japan	Live event	December 5, 2010	(Note: Hair vs. Hair Captain's Fall Tag Team Match, where Kzy teamed with Yasushi Kanda and Kotoka with BxB Hulk.)
