= Yasushi Kanda =

Japanese wrestler (born 1978)

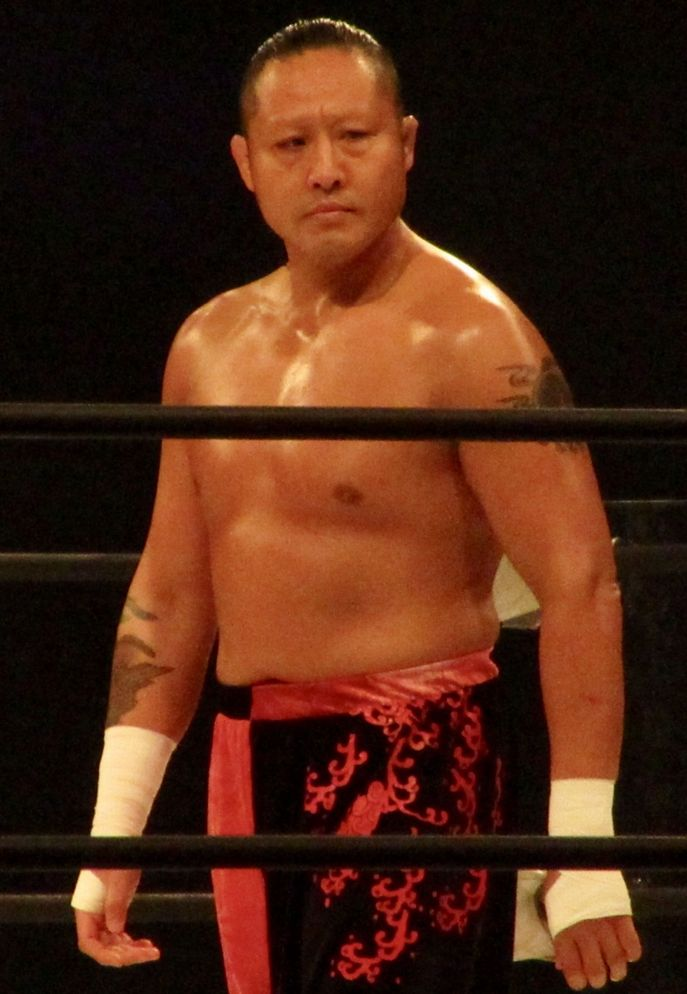
- Kanda in 2017

Personal information
- Born: August 29, 1978 (age 48) Inage-ku, Chiba, Japan

Professional wrestling career
- Ring name(s): Yasushi Kanda; Jimmy Kanda; Sumo Kanda
- Billed height: 1.75 m (5 ft 9 in)
- Billed weight: 85 kg (187 lb)
- Trained by: Último Dragón; Dos Caras
- Debut: August 29, 1998

Yasushi Kanda (神田 裕之, Kanda Yasushi; born on August 29, 1978) is a Japanese professional wrestler currently performing for the Dragon Gate wrestling promotion in Japan. He is considered one of Toryumon's greatest heel characters, and was a founding member of the M2K stable. In his pre-injury days, he was famous for his mohawk hairstyle.

== Professional wrestling career ==
=== Early years ===
Kanda was trained by Ultimo Dragon as a second term student. Shortly after debuting, he allied with Susumu Mochizuki. He would win the Young Dragons Cup, and the IWRG Intercontinental Tag Team Titles along with Susumu Mochizuki. Debuting in Toryumon Japan, Kanda and Susumu Mochizuki proved a disruptive heel presence. They were accepted into heel stable Crazy Max, but turned on them later that same night. Crazy Max retaliated by hog tying them with the ring ropes and beating them with baseball bats. They were saved by Masaaki Mochizuki. Although Susumu Mochizuki was thankful for the assist, Kanda was not, and he and Masaaki exchanged words. He would then wrestle Masaaki to a 20-minute draw. Having earned respect for each other, the stable M2K was formed. The stable's names was based on the last names of the members, two Mochizuki's (M2) and Kanda (K). Kanda was known for his trademark Mohawk hairstyle.

M2K feuded with Crazy Max, forcing it to turn face against its will. Kanda, Masaaki Mochizuki and Susumu Mochizuki would win the UWA World Trios Tag Titles. M2K would continue its successful ways. Kanda, however, suffered a legitimate neck injury on October 10, 2001, after taking a back-to-belly piledriver from Genki Horiguchi that displaced his neck vertebrae. He shifted over to a referee job.

=== Referee ===
Kanda began appearing as a heel referee. He no longer wore his mohawk, but he did not cut the hair either, simply wearing it long. He also wore a neck brace due to the injury. He was a partial heel referee for the M2K stable. This ended during a grudge match between Dragon Kid and Darkness Dragon where, tired of M2K's interference in the match, he hit all the interfering members with the blue box, then Darkness Dragon as well. M2K headhunted on Kid and Kanda, but it did not last long.

On September 8, 2002, Kanda came to the ring with his original M2K partners, Masaaki Mochizuki and Susumu Mochizuki, to officially retire from the ring. Out of respect for him, Magnum Tokyo, the current leader of M2K, sealed the name.

Kanda continued refereeing, though he no longer had an individual role. He also took an office job within the federation.

=== Return ===
In 2006, Don Fujii of heel stable Blood Generation began to harass Kanda during matches. Kanda was provoked into fighting back. At first he fought against Blood Generation's heel referee Kinta Tamaoka, but he soon returned in full, sparking a "Renaissance" concept that ended prematurely when one of the major participants, Magnum Tokyo, was injured. His full return to the ring occurred in July 2006, when he signed a wrestler's contract.

In 2007, Kanda captured the Open the Brave Gate Title from Genki Horiguchi on July 1, 2007, successfully defending it twice before losing it to Masato Yoshino on September 22.

On October 21, he was assigned to be the special referee in a match which had Naruki Doi, Masato Yoshino & Gamma of the Muscle Outlaw'z against the three referees of Dragon Gate, one of them being the recent MO'z exile Kinta Tamaoka. Just as it seemed like Kinta had the match won, Kanda turned heel and helped the MO'z win the match. He was then announced as the newest member of the group.

In 2008, most of the active stables in Dragon Gate were going through rapid shifting. Kanda feuded with both BxB Hulk and his own stablemate Masato Yoshino. His 2008 started with several high-profile wins, but this collapsed after Yoshino helped Hulk defeat him in a multiple man hair vs hair cage match, and when Hulk debuted his Killer Hulk persona, defeating him in their blow-off match in a squash. He rebounded a little, winning the Open the Triangle Gate Championship for the first time with YAMATO & Gamma on July 12, but they would lose them to Masaaki Mochizuki, Don Fujii & Magnitude Kishiwada on September 28.

Shortly after losing the titles, he and Gamma began to quarrel. The quarreling escalated further when, during subsequent tag matches they had, Kanda misfired on protein powder attacks, blinding Gamma instead of their opponents and costing them the matches. He eventually said to Gamma that he would rather team with Cyber Kongcito than him. Eventually, at the request of YAMATO, a match was made for January 18, 2009 between him and Gamma, where the loser would be kicked out of Real Hazard. He lost the match. Afterwards, he looked to get beat down by Real Hazard, but Kenichiro Arai came out to seemingly help him against them. However, Arai proceeded to assault Gamma, and he was joined by Kanda and the others, making Gamma the one ousted from the group.

On January 10, 2010, his stablemate Genki Horiguchi put out a blog where he stated that Real Hazard would win more matches via teamwork instead of illegal tactics and weapons play in 2010. During a tag match he had with Horiguchi that day, he tried to utilize a blue box to gain an advantage, but Horiguchi prevented him from doing so. Though they still won, Horiguchi's actions caused them to begin bickering. The bickering intensified the following day, when he made Horiguchi lose a tag team match by accidentally hitting him. Eventually, Real Hazard became divided over the "clean fighting" issue. Genki would be joined by Susumu Yokosuka (the former Susumu Mochizuki) & K-ness in his quest for clean fights, while Kanda was supported by Kzy and Takuya Sugawara in the pursuit of continuous use of illegal tactics to win matches. On February 10, Horiguchi, Yokosuka & K-ness left Real Hazard, and a couple of weeks later, he and the rest of Real Hazard renamed their stable Deep Drunkers. On October 13, 2010, the Deep Drunkers were forced to split up, after losing a match against World–1 (BxB Hulk, Masato Yoshino and Naruki Doi), but after the match Doi turned on his partners to form a new unnamed stable with Kanda, Kzy, Naoki Tanizaki and Takuya Sugawara. On October 25 Kanda, Tanisaki and Sugawara defeated CIMA, Gamma and Genki Horiguchi to win the Open the Triangle Gate Championship. They would lose the title to CIMA, Dragon Kid and Ricochet on December 26, 2010. On January 14, 2011, Doi's unnamed unit aligned themselves with the WARRIORS stable, who turned heel in the process. On January 18 the new group was named Blood Warriors. On February 26, Kanda was kicked out of Blood Warriors and renamed Jimmy Kanda, forming the Jimmyz stable with H-A-Gee-Mee, Jimmy KAGETORA, Ryo "Jimmy" Saito and Jimmy Susumu. Kanda, H-A-Gee-Mee and Saito then went on to win the vacant Open the Triangle Gate Championship. The Jimmyz lost the Open the Triangle Gate Championship to World-1 International (Masato Yoshino, Naruki Doi and Pac) on May 6. On November 23, 2014, Kanda defeated Ryo "Jimmy" Saito to win the Open the Owarai Gate Championship. On February 4, Kanda was lost the Open the Owarai Gate Championship to Yosuke♥Santa Maria via fan support. On September 18, 2017, the Jimmyz were forced to disband after losing a match to VerserK. After a brief farewell tour, the Jimmyz had their final match as a team on October 5, officially disbanding afterwards. During the match, Kanda attacked Jimmy Susumu, turning heel and joining Verserk, once again becoming Yasushi Kanda.

== Championships and accomplishments ==
- All Japan Pro Wrestling
  - All Asia Tag Team Championship (1 time) – with Genki Horiguchi
- Dragon Gate
  - Open the Brave Gate Championship (2 times)
  - Open the Owarai Gate Championship (1 time)
  - Open the Twin Gate Championship (1 time) – with Susumu Mochizuki
  - Open the Triangle Gate Championship (7 times) – with YAMATO and Gamma (1), Takuya Sugawara and Kzy (1), Naoki Tanizaki and Takuya Sugawara (1), Genki Horiguchi H.A.Gee.Mee!! and Ryo "Jimmy" Saito (3), and Jimmy Susumu and Mr. Kyu Kyu Naoki Tanizaki Toyonaka Dolphin (1)
- Toryumon Japan
  - IWRG Intercontinental Tag Team Championship (1 time) – with Susumu Mochizuki
  - UWA World Trios Championship (1 time) – with Susumu Mochizuki and Masaaki Mochizuki
  - Young Dragons Cup (1999)

== Luchas de Apuestas record ==
| Winner (wager) | Loser (wager) | Location | Event | Date | Notes |
|---|---|---|---|---|---|
| CIMA (hair) | Yasushi Kanda (hair) | Aichi, Japan | Dead or Alive 2008 | May 5, 2008 | (Note: Six-way steel cage match, which also included BxB Hulk, Dragon Kid, Masato Yoshino and YAMATO.) |
