= Yoshiki Kato =

Japanese professional wrestler

Personal information
- Born: 12 December 1996 (age 29) Mizunami, Japan

Professional wrestling career
- Ring name: Yoshiki Kato
- Billed height: 183 cm (6 ft 0 in)
- Billed weight: 90 kg (198 lb)
- Trained by: Dragongate Dojo
- Debut: 2022

Yoshiki Kato (加藤良輝, Katō Yoshiki) is a Japanese professional wrestler. He is signed to Dragongate, where he is the Open the Dream Gate Champion and Open the Twin Gate Champion in his first reigns. Kato has competed in multiple Japanese wrestling promotions, including Dragon Gate USA, All Japan Pro Wrestling and New Japan Pro-Wrestling.

== Professional wrestling career ==
=== Dragongate (2022–present) ===
Kato made his professional wrestling debut in Dragongate on June 5, 2022, during the second night of DG Rainbow Gate 2022. In his debut, he wrestled Takuma Ishikawa in a series of exhibition bouts that ended in a time-limit draw. Shortly afterwards, Kato joined the "Z-Brats" stable, turning heel in the process. On December 24, 2023, Kato won the Open the Triangle Gate Championship alongside Z-Brats stablemates Ishin and Kai at Final Gate 2023, after the trio defeated Dragon Kid, Punch Tominaga, and Yamato. During the second night of DG Rainbow Gate 2025 on June 4, he teamed up with stablemates Ishin and Homare to defeat Natural Vibes (Flamita, Kzy, and Strong Machine J) and win the title for the second time.

Kato has competed in various events promoted by Dragongate. In 2023, he made his first appearance at the Rey de Parejas tag tournament, where he teamed up with Kaito Nagano. The duo placed themselves in the A-block, where they scored a total of three points after competing against Kota Minoura and B×B Hulk, Yuki Yoshioka and Madoka Kikuta, H·Y·O and Ishin, Jason Lee and Jacky "Funky" Kamei, and Masaaki Mochizuki and Mochizuki Jr. Two years later, during the 2025 edition of the event, Kato again teamed up with Ishin in the A-block, where they scored a total of five points after competing against Jacky Kamei and Riiita, Kota Minoura and Jason Lee, Susumu Yokosuka and Kagetora, Yuki Yoshioka and Dragon Dia, and Ryu Fuda and Daiki Yanagiuchi. Kato and Ishin fell short of qualifying for the tournament semifinals by a single point.

In 2023, Kato made his first appearance at Gate of Destiny, Dragongate's signature annual event, where he teamed up with M3K (Masaaki Mochizuki, Susumu Mochizuki, and Mochizuki Jr.) in a losing effort against the Z-Brats (H.Y.O, Kai, and Shun Skywalker). On May 23, 2026, during Hopeful Gate 2026, Kato teamed up with Ishin to defeat the tag team Love And Peace (Riiita and Jacky Kamei) and win the Open the Twin Gate Championship. On October 2, 2026, during The Gate of Victory 2026, Kato defeated Kzy to win the Open the Dream Gate Championship for the first time.

=== Japanese independent circuit (2022–present) ===
Kato has competed in different Japanese wrestling promotions as a developmental talent sent by Dragongate. At Power Struggle 2023, an event promoted by New Japan Pro Wrestling on 4 November, Kato teamed up with Strong Machine J and Mochizuki Jr. in a losing effort against Boltin Oleg, The DKC, and Ryusuke Taguchi. During All Japan Pro-Wrestling's New Year's Eve event on December 31, 2025, Kato and Ishin defeated Musashi and Seiki Yoshioka to win the All Asia Tag Team Championship. The duo held the title until January 18, 2026, when they lost to Don Fujii and Masaaki Mochizuki at Open The New Year Gate 2026. Kato and Ishin would go on to win the title again at DG Rainbow Gate 2026, defeating Genki Horiguchi and Yasushi Kanda.

== Championships and accomplishments ==
- All Japan Pro Wrestling
  - All Asia Tag Team Championship (2 times) – with Ishin Iihashi
- Dragongate
  - Open the Dream Gate Championship (1 time, current)
  - Open the Twin Gate Championship (1 time) – with Ishin
  - Open the Triangle Gate Championship (3 times) – with Kai and Ishin (2), and Homare and Ishin (1)
  - Young Dragon Cup (2025)
- Pro Wrestling Illustrated
  - Ranked No. 455 of the top 500 singles wrestlers in the PWI 500 in 2025
