= Homare (wrestler) =

Japanese wrestler (born 2004)

Personal information
- Born: 30 August 2004 (age 22) Shizuoka, Japan

Professional wrestling career
- Ring name: Homare Kato Homare
- Billed height: 175 cm (5 ft 9 in)
- Billed weight: 75 kg (165 lb)
- Trained by: Dragongate Dojo
- Debut: 2024

Homare Kato (加藤 帆希, Katō Homare) better known mononymously by his ring name Homare (帆希) is a Japanese professional wrestler signed to Dragongate where he is a former Open the Triangle Gate Champion.

== Professional wrestling career ==
=== Dragongate (2024–present) ===
Kato made his professional wrestling debut in Dragongate at DG Storm Gate on September 5, 2024, where he fell short to Masaaki Mochizuki in singles competition.

During his time with the promotion, he chased for various championships and was part of the "Z-Brats" and "Psypatra" stables. He won the first title of his career, the Open the Triangle Gate Championship, at Rainbow Gate 2025 on June 4, by teaming up with Z-Brats stablemates Ishin and Yoshiki Kato to defeat Natural Vibes (Flamita, Kzy and Strong Machine J). In the first half of 2025, Kato competed in a tournament for the vacant Open the Brave Gate Championship in which he defeated Jacky Kamei in the first rounds, Hyo in the second, then fell short to Ryoya Tanaka in the finals for the title at Dead Or Alive 2025 on May 5.

Kato competed in various of the promotion's signature events. In the King of Gate, he made his first appearance at the 2025 edition where he fell short to Ryoya Tanaka in the first rounds. In the Rey de Parejas series of events, Kato made his first appearance at the 2025 edition by teaming up with Shun Skywalker and winning the entire competition by placing themselves in the B block, scoring a total of six points after going against the teams of Hyo and Kuroshio Tokyo Japan, Strong Machine J and Kzy, Yamato and B×B Hulk, Ben-K and Mochizuki Jr., and Masaaki Mochizuki and Akihiro Sahara. Kato and Skywalker qualified into the semifinals where they defeated Jacky Kamei and Riiita, then outmatched Kota Minoura and Jason Lee in the finals.

In the Gate of Destiny series, Kato made his first appearance at the 2024 edition where he teamed up with his "Z-Brats" stablemate Kai and Demus to unsuccessfully challenge Natural Vibes (Big Boss Shimizu, Strong Machine J and U-T) for the Open the Triangle Gate Championship.

== Championships and accomplishments ==
- Dragongate
  - Open the Brave Gate Championship (1 time, current)
  - Open the Triangle Gate Championship (2 times) – with Ishin and Yoshiki Kato (1) and Shun Skywalker and Gianni Valletta (1)
  - Rey de Parejas (2025) – with Shun Skywalker
