= Ishin (wrestler) =

Japanese professional wrestler

Ishin Iihashi
Personal information
- Born: October 27, 1997 (age 29) Musashino, Japan
- Family: Riki Iihashi (brother); Ishinriki Kōji (father); Utako Hozumi (mother)

Professional wrestling career
- Ring name(s): Ishin; Ishin Iihashi; Masked Z
- Billed height: 168 cm (5 ft 6 in)
- Billed weight: 78 kg (172 lb)
- Trained by: Dragongate dojo
- Debut: 2021

Ishin Iihashi (飯橋 偉進, Iihashi Ishin), known mononymously as Ishin (stylized in all caps), is a Japanese professional wrestler currently signed to Dragongate. He is one half of the current Open The Twin Gate Champions with Yoshiki Kato, and is a former Open the Triangle and Open the Brave Gate Champion.

== Professional wrestling career ==
=== Dragongate (2021–present) ===
Iihashi made his professional wrestling debut in Dragongate at DG Dangerous Gate 2021 from September 20, where he teamed up with his brother Riki Iihashi in a losing effort against Don Fujii and Yasushi Kanda as a result of a tag team match. During his time in the company, he joined the unit of M3K which he has later defected by turning heel and joining the villanous stable of Z-Brats. He also chased for various titles such as the Open the Triangle Gate Championship which he has won on two separate occasions, both times alongside Z-Brats stablemates. First at the 2022 Gate of Destiny on November 6 with Kai and Shun Skywalker, and secondly at Final Gate 2023 on December 24 alongside Kai and Yoshiki Kato by defeating Dragon Kid, Punch Tominaga and Yamato. He first won the Open the Brave Gate Championship at Kobe Festival 2023 on July 2 by defeating Jason Lee. He has held the title on one more separate occasion, winning it on the seventh night of the Gate Of Victory 2023 from October 14, where he defeated Kzy. He also competed for the Open the Twin Gate Championship at DG Dead Or Alive 2023 on May 5 against Kongo's Shuji Kondo and Kenoh by teaming up with stablemate Kai but came out unsuccessful.

Iihashi competed in various signature events promoted by the company. In the King of Gate tournament which is Dragongate's biggest yearly competition, he made his first appearance at the 2022 edition where he went into a time-limit draw against Takuma Fujiwara in the first rounds. He then unsuccessfully participated in a resurrection battle royal for a second chance inside the tournament won by Kota Minoura and also involving many other opponents such as Ben-K, BxB Hulk, Diamante, Dragon Dia, Kaito Ishida, Takashi Yoshida, Naruki Doi, Yosuke Santa Maria, Madoka Kikuta and many others. At the 2023 edition, he defeated Minorita in the first rounds but fell short to Shuji Kondo in the second ones.

As for the Gate of Destiny event, the event's biggest yearly pay-per-view which takes place at the beginning of November, Iihashi made his first appearance at the 2021 editionby teaming up with his brother Riki and Último Dragón in a losing effort against Masaaki Mochizuki, Yasushi Kanda and Takumi Hayakawa. One year later at the 2022 edition, he teamed up with his Z-Brats stablemates Kai and Shun Skywalker to defeat M3K (Masaaki Mochizuki, Susumu Mochizuki and Mochizuki Junior) for the Open the Triangle Gate Championship. At the 2023 edition of the event, Iihashi defeated Ryoya Tanaka to successfully defend the Open the Brave Gate Championship.

==== Japanese independent circuit (2022) ====
Iihashi briefly competed in several of the Japanese independent scene promotions as a developmental talent sent by Dragongate. At Tenryu Project Wrestle And Romance Vol. 7 on October 6, 2022, he teamed up with Kotaro Nasu to defeat Mizuki Watase and Naoki Tanizaki. He took part in a cross-over event promoted by them alongside Pro Wrestling Noah on November 11, 2022, the NOAH Global Dream where he teamed up with Manabu Soya to win a five-way tag team match also involving Gold Class (Ben-K and Minorita), Los Perros del Mal de Japón (Eita and Super Crazy), M3K (Susumu Mochizuki and Yasushi Kanda), and Big Boss Shimizu and Mohammed Yone.

== Personal life ==
Ishin's older brother Riki Iihashi is also a professional wrestler, who retired early in his career. They are the sons of sumo wrestler Ishinriki Kōji and former professional wrestler Utako Hozumi.

== Championships and accomplishments ==
- All Japan Pro Wrestling
  - All Asia Tag Team Championship (2 times) – with Yoshiki Kato
- Dragongate
  - Open the Brave Gate Championship (2 times)
  - Open the Twin Gate Championship (1 time) – with Yoshiki Kato
  - Open the Triangle Gate Championship (5 times) – with Kai and Shun Skywalker (2), Kai and Yoshiki Kato (2) and Homare and Yoshiki Kato (1)
- Pro Wrestling Illustrated
  - Ranked No. 240 of the top 500 singles wrestlers in the PWI 500 in 2024
