= La Estrella (wrestler) =

Japanese wrestler (born 1993)

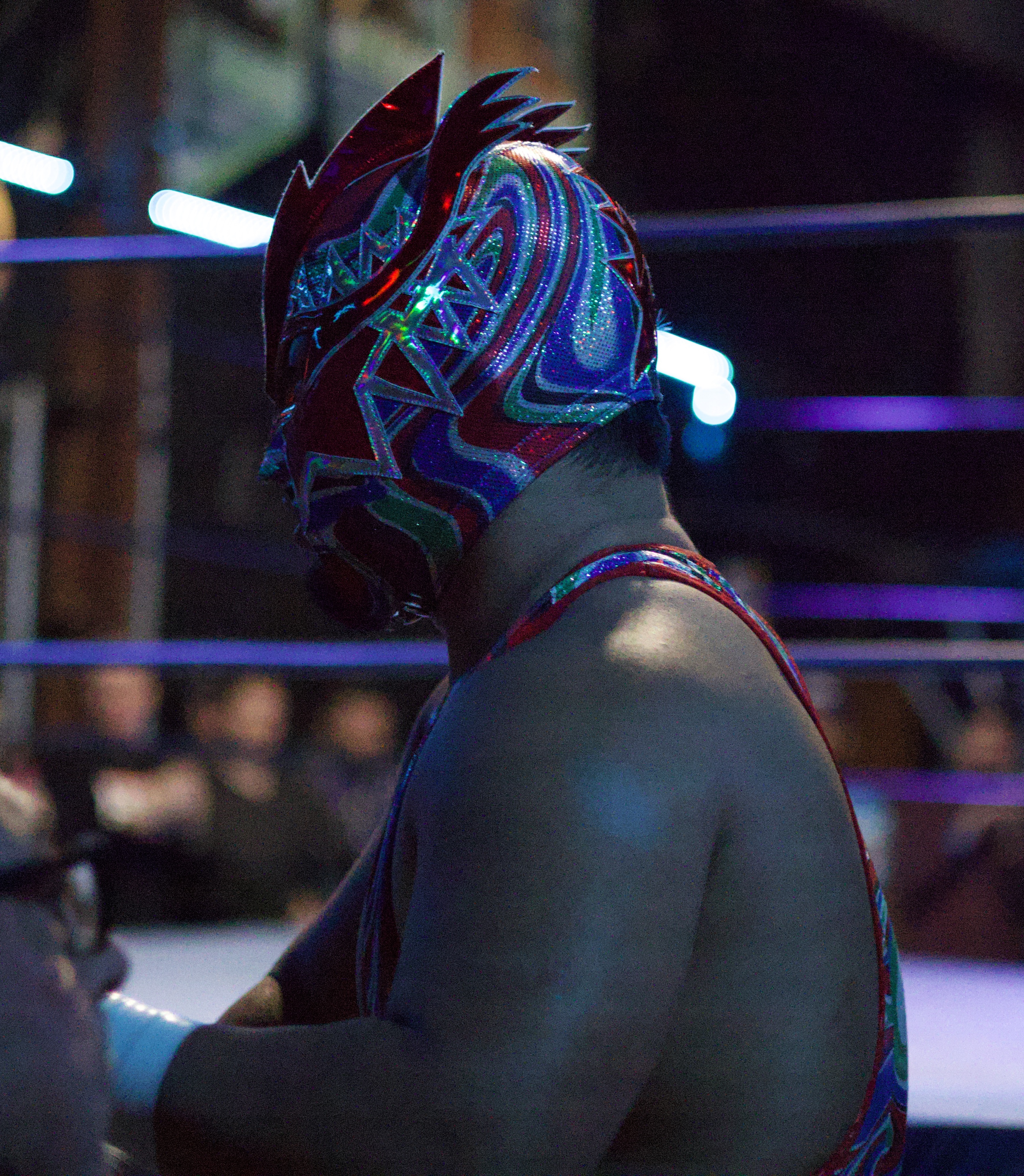
- La Estrella in April 2024

Personal information
- Born: 9 October 1993 (age 33) Inagawa, Japan
- Family: Madoka Kikuta (cousin)

Professional wrestling career
- Ring name: La Estrella
- Billed height: 160 cm (5 ft 3 in)
- Billed weight: 73 kg (161 lb)
- Trained by: Dragon Kid
- Debut: 2020

La Estrella (ラ・エストレージャ, Ra esutorejia) is a Japanese masked professional wrestler, He is currently performing both of the Japanese and North American independent scene. He is best known for his time with Dragongate where he is a former Open the Triangle Gate Champion.

== Professional wrestling career ==
=== Dragongate (2020–2024) ===
La Estrella made his professional wrestling debut at the ninth night of the Dragon Gate Fantastic Gate 2020 from December 15, where he defeated Susumu Yokosuka in singles competition.

During his time with the promotion, he chased for various championships and was part of the "MASQUERADE" stable. He won the first title of his career, the Open the Triangle Gate Championship, at Dead or Alive 2021 on May 5, by teaming up with stablemates Dragon Dia and Jason Lee, defeating Natural Vibes (Kzy, Genki Horiguchi and Susumu Yokosuka). At DG Memorial Gate 2022 In Wakayama on February 23, he teamed up with Jason Lee to unsuccessfully challenge Dragon Dia and Yuki Yoshioka for the Open the Twin Gate Championship. At Hopeful Gate 2023 on May 21, 2023, he unsuccessfully challenged Jason Lee for the Open the Brave Gate Championship.

La Estrella competed in various of the promotion's signature events. In the Gate of Destiny series of events, he made his first appearance at the 2021 edition where he teamed up with his "MASQUERADE" stablemates Shun Skywalker, Kota Minoura and Dragon Dia to defeat R.E.D (Kai, Diamante, SB Kento and Dia Inferno). As for the King of Gate, he made his first appearance at the 2022 edition where he fell short to Strong Machine J in the first rounds.

=== Japanese independent circuit (2021–present) ===
La Estrella competed in the Japanese independent scene as a developmental talent sent by Dragongate. He competed in the Michinoku Pro 7th Fukumen World League where he fell short to Pantera Jr. in the first rounds from October 11, 2024.

=== North American independent circuit (2022–present) ===
La Estrella made several appearances in events promoted by Lucha Libre AAA Worldwide. At Lucha Libre World Cup 2023, he teamed up with Takuma Nishikawa and Kuukai in a losing effort against Sam Adonis, Johnny Caballero and Christopher Daniels in the Lucha Libre World Cup men's tournament first round. At AAA Luchando Por Mexico on September 23, 2023, he unsuccessfully challenged Komander, Kuukai and Mecha Wolf in a four-way match for the vacant AAA World Cruiserweight Championship.

In Major League Wrestling (MLW), La Estrella made his debut at MLW Fusion #154 on June 23, 2022, where he unsuccessfully challenged Lince Dorado, Arez and reigning champion Myron Reed for the MLW World Middleweight Championship. He then competed in the 40-man Battle Riot match for a future MLW World Heavyweight Championship chance at Battle Riot IV, bout won by Jacob Fatu. At SuperFight on February 4, 2023, he fell short to Sam Adonis in singles competition.

=== All Elite Wrestling (2022) ===
La Estrella made his debut in All Elite Wrestling at AEW Dark #169 on October 21, 2022, where he teamed up with SB Kento in a losing effort against Dante Martin and Matt Sydal.

== Championships and accomplishments ==
- Dragongate
  - Open the Triangle Gate Championship (1 time) – with Dragon Dia and Jason Lee
