= U-T (wrestler) =

Japanese professional wrestler

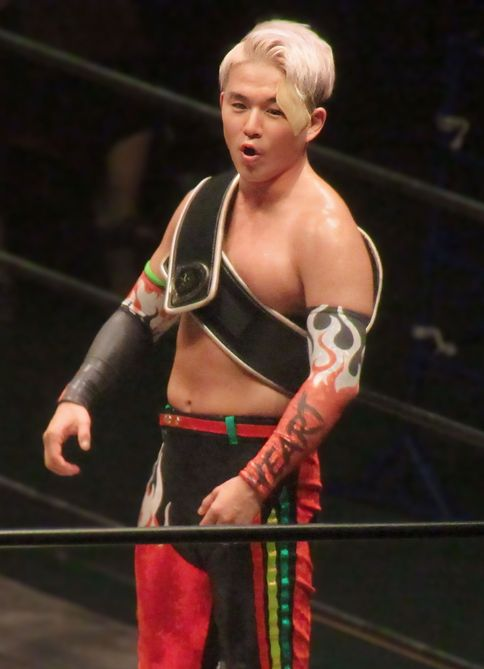
- U-T in July 2024

Personal information
- Born: September 23, 1993 (age 32) Nagoya, Japan

Professional wrestling career
- Ring name: Yūta Tanaka U-T
- Billed height: 162 cm (5 ft 4 in)
- Billed weight: 70 kg (154 lb)
- Trained by: Dragongate dojo
- Debut: 2013

Yūta Tanaka (田中裕太, Tanaka Yūta) better known by his ring name U-T is a Japanese professional wrestler currently signed to Dragongate where he is the current Open the Brave Gate Champion in his first reign. In Dragongate, he is also a former three-time Open the Triangle Gate Champion.

== Professional wrestling career ==
=== Dragongate (2013–present) ===
Trained by the Dragongate dojo, Tanaka made his professional wrestling debut in Desastre Total Ultraviolento (DTU), a promotion from the Mexican independent circuit where Dragongate sent their rookie competitors in excursions. He made his first appearance at DTU La Puerta A La Gloria on April 14, 2013, where he competed in a four-way match won by Jhonky and also involving Articus and Hellboy.

In Dragongate shows, Tanaka made his debut on the 13th night of Dragon Gate The Gate Of Generation 2013 from August 30, where he teamed up with Millennials unit stablemates Eita and T-Hawk to defeat Punch Tominaga, Masato Yoshino and Ryotsu Shimizu. During his time with the promotion, Tanaka also joined other stables such as Tribe Vanguard, Team Dragon Gate and Natural Vibes. He has chased for various titles promoted by Dragongate. He won the Open the Triangle Gate Championship on three separate occasions. First at Memorial Gate in Wakayama on March 16, 2013, where he teamed up with Eita and T-Hawk to defeat Jimmyz (Jimmy Kanda, Jimmy Susumu and Mr. Kyu Kyu Naoki Tanizaki Toyonaka Dolphin, secondly at Truth Gate 2022 on February 20, where he teamed up with "Natural Vibes" stablemates Kzy and Jacky Kamei to defeat Z-Brats (H.Y.O, BxB Hulk and Shun Skywalker) for the vacant titles, and thirdly at Hopeful Gate 2024 on May 9, where he teamed up with Big Boss Shimizu and Strong Machine J to defeat Z-Brats (Ishin Iihashi, Kai and Shun Skywalker).

Tanaka competed in various signature events promoted by the company. In the King of Gate tournamrnt which is Dragongate's biggest yearly competition, he made his first appearance at the 2019 edition, where he placed himself in the Block A where he scored a total of two points after going against Kazma Sakamoto, Kzy, Naruki Doi, Ryo Saito and Punch Tominaga. At the 2021 edition, he placed himself in the Block C of the competition where he scored a total of four points after going against Yamato, Shun Skywalker, Keisuke Okuda, Kaito Ishida and H.Y.O. At the 2022 edition, Tanaka fell short to Kagetora in the first rounds. At the 2023 edition he fell short to H.Y.O. in the first rounds.

As for the Gate of Destiny event, the promotion's biggest annual pay-per-view which takes place at the beginning of November, Tanaka made his first appearance at the 2015 edition where he teamed up with Yosuke Santa Maria in a losing effort against Super Shisa and Shachihoko Boy. At the 2017 edition, he teamed up with Ryo Saito and Don Fujii in a losing effort against VerserK (Punch Tominaga, T-Hawk and Yasushi Kanda). One year later, he teamed up with "Tribe Vanguard" stablemates Kagetora, Yosuke Santa Maria, and Kota Minoura in a losing effort against Daga and R.E.D. (Eita, Kazma Sakamoto and Yasushi Kanda). At the 2020 edition, Tanaka teamed up with Jimmy, Mondai Ryu and Yosuke Santa Maria to defeat K-ness, Shachihoko Boy, Konomama Ichikawa and Ho Ho Lun. At the 2022 edition, he teamed up again with stablemates Kzy, Jason Lee and Jacky Kamei to defeat Naruki Doi, Último Dragón, Don Fujii and Shuji Kondo.

=== Japanese independent circuit (2013, 2021–2023) ===
Tanaka briefly competed in several of the Japanese independent scene promotions as a developmental talent sent by Dragongate. At NOAH Global Dream, a cross-over event held in partnership with Pro Wrestling Noah, Tanaka teamed up with Jason Lee and Strong Machine J in a losing effort against Atsushi Kotoge, Dante Leon and Punch Tominaga.

== Championships and accomplishments ==
- Dragongate
  - Open the Brave Gate Championship (1 time)
  - Open the Triangle Gate Championship (3 times) – with Eita and T-Hawk (1), Jacky Kamei and Kzy (1) and Big Boss Shimizu and Strong Machine J (1)
- Ryukyu Dragon Pro Wrestling
  - Sou Ryuo Tag Team Championship (1 time) – with Kzy
