= Shachihoko Boy =

Japanese professional wrestler

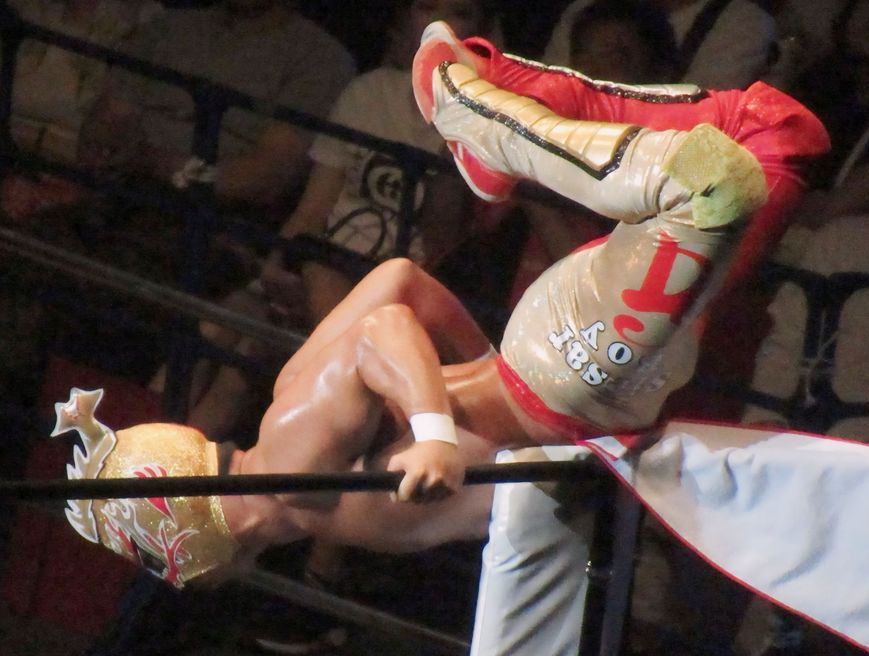
- Shachihoko Boy in July 2024

Personal information
- Born: April 3, 1970 (age 56) Yakage, Japan

Professional wrestling career
- Ring names: Shachihoko Boy; Shachihoko Machine; Shachihoko Machine #2; Shachihoko Majin #2; Shisa Boy
- Billed height: 168 cm (5 ft 6 in)
- Billed weight: 75 kg (165 lb)
- Trained by: Último Dragón; Skayde
- Debut: 2002

Shachihoko Boy (しゃちほこBOY, Shachihoko Bōi) is a Japanese professional wrestler currently working for the Japanese promotion Dragon Gate where he is a former Open the Twin Gate Champion and Open the Triangle Gate Champion. Shachihoko Boy's real name is not a matter of public record, as is often the case with masked wrestlers in the Lucha Libre where their private lives are kept a secret from the wrestling fans.

== Professional wrestling career ==
=== Independent circuit (2002–present) ===
Shachihoko Boy is known for seldomly competing for various promotions from the Japanese independent scene. On the seventh night of the AJPW Excite Series 2018 from February 22, he teamed up with Violent Giants (Shuji Ishikawa and Suwama) to defeat Atsushi Maruyama, Jun Akiyama and Kai.

=== Toryumon Project (2002–2003) ===
Shachihoko Boy made his professional wrestling debut in Toryumon Project on January 23, 2002, at T2P Desembarcamiento II, where he teamed up with Shachihoko Machine #1 in a losing effort against Toru Owashi as a result of a two-on-one handicap match. He has spent around the year in the company as a trainee of Último Dragón and competed in a tag team with Shachihoko Machine #1 during his entire tenure. He wrestled his last match for the promotion on January 27, 2003, at T2P La Ultima Function where he teamed up with Machine #1 against Jorge Rivera.

=== Dragon Gate (2004–present) ===
Shachihoko Boy made his debut in Dragon Gate on July 17, 2004, at Dragon Gate Every Day Pro Wrestling 2004: Vol. 02, where he teamed up with Super Shisa in a losing effort against Anthony W. Mori and Ryo Saito. The first stable he has ever been part of was "World-1 International". He won his first championship at Crown Gate 2012 on November 17, where he teamed up with stablemates Masato Yoshino and Naruki Doi and defeated Gamma, HUB and Magnitude Kishiwada for the Open the Triangle Gate Championship. He has held the championship on two separate occasions. At Champion Gate 2016 in Osaka on March 1, he teamed up with "Monster Express" stablemate Masato Yoshino and defeated Mad Blankey (Cyber Kong and Yamato to win the Open the Twin Gate Championship. At DG Rainbow Gate 2021 on June 26, he competed in a battle royal won by Kzy and also involving Dia Inferno, Diamante, La Estrella, Mondai Ryu, U-T and others.

He is known for competing in various of the promotion's signature events, such as the King of Gate tournament, making his first appearance at the first-ever edition of the event from 2005, where he wrestled into a no-contest against Stalker Ichikawa in the first rounds. After a ten-year break, at the 2015 edition, he fell short to Cyber Kong in the same phase.

He also competed in the Gate of Destiny series of pay-per-views, which is considered to be the promotion's top yearly event. He made his first appearance at the 2008 edition where he teamed up with Super Shisa to defeat Shinobu and m.c.KZ. He usually competed in six-man tag team matches every time he has performed in these events. At the 2012 edition, he teamed up with A. R. Fox and Super Shisa to defeat Jimmy Kagetora, Kotoka and Super Shenlong. At the 2013 event, he teamed up with Ryotsu Shimizu and Super Shisa in a losing effort against Jimmyz (Jimmy Kanda, Jimmy Susumu and Ryo Jimmy Saito). In 2014, he teamed up with Masato Yoshino and Shingo Takagi as "Monster Express" and defeated Dia.HEARTS (Big R Shimizu, Dragon Kid and Masaaki Mochizuki). At the 2017 edition, he teamed up with K-ness, Yosuke Santa Maria and Misterioso Jr. to defeat Over Generation (Gamma, Kaito Ishida & Mondai Ryu) and Jason Lee. In 2019, he competed in a Ten-man battle royal won by Dragon Dia and also involving Ho Ho Lun, Jimmy, Kagetora, Kanjyuro Matsuyama, Mondai Ryu, Oji Shiiba, Punch Tominaga and Stalker Ichikawa.

== Championships and accomplishments ==
- Dragon Gate
  - Open the Twin Gate Championship (1 time) – with Masato Yoshino
  - Open the Triangle Gate Championship (2 times) – with Masato Yoshino and Naruki Doi (1); and Naruki Doi and Rich Swann (1)
