= Mochizuki Jr. =

Japanese professional wrestler

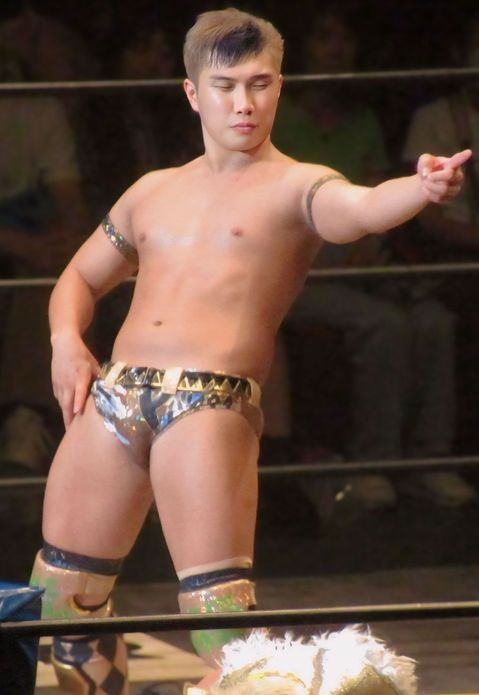
- Mochizuki in July 2024

Personal information
- Born: 20 April 2002 (age 24) Tokyo, Japan
- Family: Masaaki Mochizuki (father)

Professional wrestling career
- Ring name: Ryoto Mochizuki Masaharu Eto Mochizuki Jr.
- Billed height: 173 cm (5 ft 8 in)
- Billed weight: 80 kg (176 lb)
- Debut: 2022

Ryoto Mochizuki (望月 龍斗, Mochizuki Ryoto) better known for his ring name Mochizuki Jr. (望月ジュニア, Mochizuki Junia) is a Japanese professional wrestler, currently signed to Dragongate where he is a former Open the Triangle Gate Champion and a member of Love & Peace.

== Professional wrestling career ==
=== Dragongate (2022–present) ===
Mochizuki made his professional wrestling debut on the first night of the 2022 edition of the King of Gate tournament from May 11, where he fell short to Kaito Nagano in singles competition as a result of an exhibition bout. During his time with the promotion, Mochizuki first joined the short-lived "M3K" stable under the ring name of "Ryoto Mochizuki" alongside his real life father Masaaki Mochizuki, Susumu Mochizuki and Yasushi Kanda. He wrestled for the first time under the stable banner at DG Toryumon Reunion Vol. 2 on June 3, 2022, where the four of them teamed up to defeat Aagan Iisou (Shogo Takagi, Shuji Kondo, Toru Owashi and Yasshi).

Mochizuki chased for various titles promoted by Dragongate. At DG Kobe World 2022 ~ Ultimo Dragon 35th Anniversary on July 30, 2022, he teamed up with M3K stablemates Masaaki and Susumu Mochizuki to defeat Los Perros del Mal de Japón (Eita, Nosawa Rongai and Kotaro Suzuki) for the Open the Triangle Gate Championship. This represented Mochizuki's first title win in Dragongate.

In the Gate of Destiny series of events, he made his debut at the 2023 edition where he teamed up with Masaaki Mochizuki and Yoshiki Kato in a losing effort against Z-Brats (H.Y.O, Kai and Shun Skywalker).

=== Japanese independent circuit (2022–present) ===
Mochizuki often competes in several of the Japanese independent scene promotions as developmental talent sent by Dragongate. He took part in a cross-over event promoted by them alongside Pro Wrestling Noah on November 11, 2022, the NOAH Global Dream where he teamed up with Madoka Kikuta and Ryu Fuda in a losing effort against Kai Fujimura, Yasutaka Yano and Yoshiki Inamura. At Noah The New Year 2023 on January 1, Mochizuki teamed up with M3K stablemates Masaaki and Susumu Mochizuki to defeat El Hijo del Dr. Wagner Jr., Atsushi Kotoge and Seiki Yoshioka.

At New Japan Pro Wrestling's 2023 Power Struggle from November 4, Mochizuki teamed up with Strong Machine J and Yohsiki Kato in a losing effort against Boltin Oleg, The DKC and Ryusuke Taguchi.

=== European independent circuit (2024) ===
Mochizuki went into a foreign excursion in the first half of 2024, where he has mainly competed in Westside Xtreme Wrestling (wXw), British Kingdom Pro-Wrestling and PCW UK Live. On the first night of the 2024 edition of the 16 Carat Gold Tournament from March 8, Mochizuki defeated Anita Vaughan, Jacob Crane and Nick Schreier in a four-way match outside of the main competition.

== Championships and accomplishments ==
- British Kingdom Pro-Wrestling
  - 4FW Junior Heavyweight Championship (1 time)
- Dragongate
  - Open the Triangle Gate Championship (2 times) – with Masaaki Mochizuki and Susumu Mochizuki (1) and Ben-K and Hyo (1)
- Exposure Wrestling Entertainment
  - Exposure Crown Championship (1 time, current)
