= New Hazard =

Professional wrestling stable

- New Hazard unveiling their banner on May 7, 2007

Stable
- Members: BxB Hulk; Cyber Kong; Shingo Takagi; Yamato; Jack Evans; El Generico; Austin Aries
- Debut: April 17, 2007
- Disbanded: May 14, 2008

New Hazard was a professional wrestling stable in the Japanese promotion Dragon Gate, formed in April 2007. It was founded by former Typhoon and Muscle Outlaw'z members BxB Hulk and Cyber Kong, intending to compete with the two opposing factions. Shingo Takagi and Yamato, who were on tours of the United States at the time, were also announced as members. Jack Evans, a member of Muscle Outlaw'z, joined in May 2007, teaming with Yamato as a mystery partner to defeat the MO'z team of Naruki Doi and Masato Yoshino. Hulk, Kong and Takagi are former two-time holders of the Open the Triangle Gate title.

== History ==
On April 17, 2007, a 7-on-7 elimination match was scheduled between the Typhoon and Muscle Outlawz factions; in the weeks leading up to this match, Cima and Naruki Doi (from Typhoon and MO'z respectively) proclaimed that someone on the opposing team would betray their partners. Typhoon won the match, after which BxB Hulk, a Typhoon member, attacked Cima, presumably to join Muscle Outlaw'z. Cyber Kong of MO'z also attacked his faction partner, Gamma, and Hulk and Kong shook hands, announcing the formation of a new stable. They said they would be joined by Shingo Takagi and Yamato Onodera, both wrestling in the U.S. at the time.

Takagi returned on May 6, teaming with Hulk to defeat the Tozawa-juku team of Akira Tozawa and Kenichiro Arai; Onodera, using his former ring name Yamato, returned the following night, teaming with Hulk, Kong and Takagi to defeat Muscle Outlaw'z. After the match, the four unveiled their name and logo, proclaiming themselves New Hazard. On May 10, Jack Evans, at the time a member of MO'z, revealed himself as the mystery partner of Yamato for a tag team match against Muscle's Naruki Doi and Masato Yoshino, in which NH emerged victorious. On that same night, Takagi, Hulk and Kong defeated Typhoon's Cima, Ryo Saito and Susumu Yokosuka to claim the Open the Triangle Gate title, winning their first title since New Hazard's formation just 23 days prior. Their first and only defense came on July 1, defeating the Muscle Outlaw'z team of Naruki Doi, Masato Yoshino and Magnitude Kishiwada at Dragon Gate's annual Kobe World Hall event under controversial circumstances, as the referee counted Yoshino's shoulders down for a pinfall despite Yoshino having kicked out after a two count.

On July 10, BxB Hulk suffered a broken jaw in a match against Ryo Saito in a tournament to decide the #1 contender to the Open the Dream Gate title; this forced New Hazard to vacate the Triangle Gate title on July 13. As a result, a scheduled title rematch against Doi, Yoshino and Kishiwada was changed to a decision match featuring the same Muscle Outlaw'z team facing Kong, Takagi and Jack Evans, with MO'z coming out on top.

On November 9, Yamato invited Shinobu (who performed previously as Super Shenlong in Dragon Gate) to join New Hazard, after he lost a Mascara contra Caballera (mask vs. hair) match to Yūki Ōno. Shinobu accepted Yamato's invitation, but he only appeared on larger shows. PWG and ROH wrestler El Generico joined them in the summer of 2007, followed by ROH wrestler Austin Aries at the end of the year. While he was never sworn in as an official member, Jack Evans would align with them whenever he wrestled for Dragon Gate.

On April 17, 2008, Yamato betrayed New Hazard and joined the Muscle Outlaw'z faction after turning on his tag partner Naoki Tanisaki in a match against Gamma and Genki Horiguchi. However, this was all a ruse, for on May 14, Shingo and Kong turned on BxB Hulk before they were to defend their Open the Triangle Gate titles against Gamma, Yamato and Genki, ending New Hazard after a year of activity. Shingo and Kong then shook hands with the remainder of the Muscle Outlaw'z faction, revealing the ruse as the formation of DG's newest super-heel group, Real Hazard. Shinobu would eventually become an "exchange student" in the Tozawa-juku faction.

== Championships and accomplishments ==
- Dragon Gate
  - Open the Triangle Gate Championship (2 times) – BxB Hulk, Cyber Kong and Shingo Takagi
- Pro Wrestling Noah
  - GHC Junior Heavyweight Tag Team Championship (1 time) – BxB Hulk and Shingo Takagi
