= Gianni Valletta =

Maltese professional wrestler

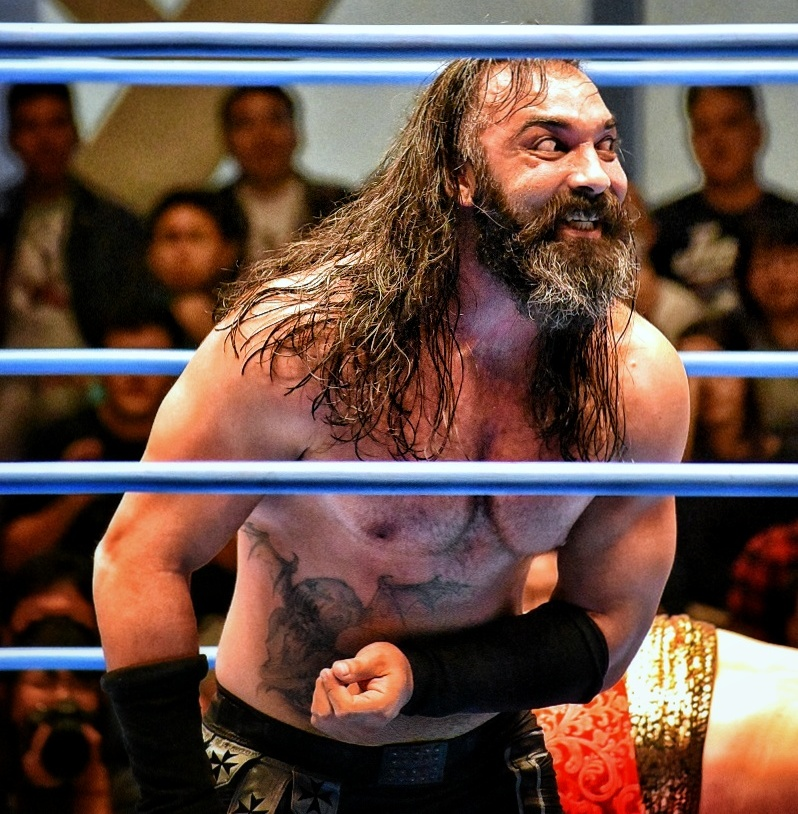
- Valletta in September 2019

Personal information
- Born: Wayne Pace; August 8, 1989 (age 37) Żurrieq, Malta

Professional wrestling career
- Ring name(s): Gianni de la Valette; Maltese Warrior; Gianni Valletta
- Billed height: 192 cm (6 ft 4 in)
- Billed weight: 118 kg (260 lb)
- Debut: 2011

Wayne Pace (born August 8, 1989), better known by his ring name Gianni Valletta, is a Maltese professional wrestler currently working for the Japanese promotion Dragon Gate where he is a member of the Psypatra stable.

== Professional wrestling career ==
=== Independent circuit (2011–present) ===
Pace began his professional wrestling career in the European independent scene. He first in the Pro Wrestling Malta promotion where once defeated a notable opponent, Pete Dunne on July 1, 2016, at PWM Retribution. At BEW International Grand Prix 2016, an event promoted by British Empire Wrestling in partnership with World Wonder Ring Stardom on May 22, 2016, Pace teamed up with Kyle Ashmore and Theodore Powers in a losing effort to The Buffet Club (Lance Lawrence, Ray Linofloor and Rob Cage) as a result of a six-man elimination tag team match.

==== All Japan Pro Wrestling (2018–2020) ====
Pace had a brief run with All Japan Pro Wrestling. On the sixth night of the AJPW Summer Action Series 2018 from July 22, he teamed up with Tajiri to unsuccessfully challenge Violent Giants (Shuji Ishikawa and Suwama) for the AJPW World Tag Team Championship. His last match took place at AJPW What We Can Do Now on April 6, 2020, where he fell short to Jiro Kuroshio.

Pace is known for competing in the promotion's signature events. At the 2018 edition of the World's Strongest Tag Determination League where he teamed up with Tajiri, and scoring a total of six points after competing against the teams of Joe Doering and Dylan James, Jun Akiyama and Daisuke Sekimoto, Kai and Kengo Mashimo, Shuji Ishikawa and Suwama, Odinson and Parrow, Kento Miyahara and Yoshitatsu, Takao Omori and Manabu Soya, Zeus and The Bodyguard, Jake Lee and Ryoji Sai, and Yuma Aoyagi and Naoya Nomura. He also made an appearance in the 2019 edition of the event where he teamed up with Takashi Yoshida and scoring a total of eight points after going against the same teams from the preceding year as well as Yoshitatsu and Joel Redman.

As for the Champion Carnival branch of events, Pace made his only appearance at the 2019 edition of the event where he placed himself in the Block A and scored a total of six points after competing against the reigning Triple Crown Heavyweight Champion Kento Miyahara, Atsushi Aoki, Dylan James, Yuji Okabayashi, Shuji Ishikawa, Zeus, Ryoji Sai and Yuma Aoyagi.

==== International Wrestling Revolution Group (2021–present) ====
Pace made his debut in the International Wrestling Revolution Group at IWRG Thursday Night Wrestling on September 2, 2021, where he teamed up with El Hijo de Fishman and El Hijo de Pirata Morgan to defeat El Hijo del Alebrije, Texano Jr. and Veneno in a six-man tag team match. On September 5 at a house show he won the vacant IWRG Intercontinental Heavyweight Championship after competing in a battle royal also involving Black Taurus, El Hijo de Dr. Wagner Jr., Heddi Karaoui and others. He dropped the title to El Hijo del Espectro Jr. eleven days later.

== Championships and accomplishments ==
- British Empire Wrestling
  - British Empire Heavyweight Championship (1 time)
- Dragongate
  - Open the Triangle Gate Championship (1 time) – with Homare and Shun Skywalker
  - King of Gate (2025)
- International Wrestling Revolution Group
  - IWRG Intercontinental Heavyweight Championship (1 time)
- Pro Wrestling Illustrated
  - Ranked No. 278 of the top singles wrestlers in the PWI 500 in 2026
- Pro Wrestling Malta
  - PWM Heavyweight Championship (1 time)
  - Baron Cup (2020)
