= Open the Triangle Gate Championship =

Professional wrestling trios tag team championship

- Official design of the titles (2021–present)

Details
- Promotion: Dragon Gate
- Date established: November 7, 2004
- Current champions: XenisS (El Cielo, Kota Minoura and Yuki Yoshioka)
- Date won: November 5, 2026
Statistics
- First champions: Italian Connection (Milano Collection AT, Anthony W. Mori and Yossino)
- Most reigns: (as a team); Jimmyz (Genki Horiguchi H.A.Gee.Mee!!, Jimmy Kanda and Ryo "Jimmy" Saito) and Do Fixer (Dragon Kid, Genki Horiguchi and Ryo Saito) (3 reigns) (as an individual); Naruki Doi (14 reigns)
- Longest reign: Blood Generation (Cima, Magnitude Kishiwada and Masato Yoshino) (319 days)
- Shortest reign: R.E.D. (Eita, Kaito Ishida and H.Y.O) (<1 day)
- Oldest champion: Yoshinari Ogawa (55 years, 217 days)
- Youngest champion: Flamita (19 years, 5 days)
- Heaviest champion: Akebono (462 lbs)
- Lightest champion: Minorita (148 lbs)

The Open the Triangle Gate Championship is a professional wrestling trios title in Japanese promotion Dragon Gate. It was created on November 7, 2004 when The Italian Connection faction of Milano Collection A.T., Anthony W. Mori and Yossino defeated Aagan Iisou's Shuji Kondo, Takuya Sugawara and "brother" Yasshi in a tournament final. Each title belt's face has three emblems on it, shaped in a triangle, that represent Power, Technique and Mind.

Not including interim reigns, there have been a total of 76 recognized individual champions and 85 recognized trios, who have had a combined 101 official reigns.

== Title history ==
Key
No.	Overall reign number
Reign	Reign number for the specific team—reign numbers for the individuals are in parentheses, if different
Days	Number of days held
Defenses	Number of successful defenses
†	Championship change is unrecognized by the promotion
+	Current reign is changing daily

No.	Champion	Championship change			Reign statistics			Notes	Ref.
No.	Champion	Date	Event	Location	Reign	Days	Defenses	Notes	Ref.
Dragon Gate
1	Italian Connection (Milano Collection AT, Anthony W. Mori and Yossino)	November 7, 2004	Rey de Parejas	Sapporo, Japan	1	108	2	Defeated Aagan Iisou ("brother" Yasshi, Shuji Kondo and Takuya Sugawara) in a tournament final.	
†	Blood Generation (Cima, Naruki Doi and Shingo Takagi)	February 23, 2005	—	Tokyo, Japan	1	11	0	Defeated Final M2K (Kenichiro Arai, Masaaki Mochizuki and Susumu Yokosuka) to become interim champions due to Milano getting injured. This match was originally against Mochizuki, Yokosuka and K-ness, but K-ness was quickly replaced due to injury.	
2	Do Fixer (Dragon Kid, Genki Horiguchi and Ryo Saito)	March 6, 2005	The Brave Gate Tour	Sapporo, Japan	1	119	1	This was a two out of three falls match to decide the official champions, which Do Fixer won 2-1.	
3	Blood Generation (Cima, Don Fujii and Naruki Doi)	July 3, 2005	Kobe Pro-Wrestling Festival 2005	Kobe, Japan	1	6	1		
4	Do Fixer (Dragon Kid (2), Genki Horiguchi (2) and Ryo Saito (2))	July 9, 2005	Rainbow Gate	Morodomi, Japan	2	3	1		
5	Blood Generation (Cima (2), Magnitude Kishiwada and Masato Yoshino (2))	July 12, 2005	Rainbow Gate tour	Tokyo, Japan	1	319	3	This was originally a two out of three falls match which Do Fixer won 2-1, winning both falls by disqualification; it was restarted as an elimination match, which Blood Generation won.	
—	Vacated	May 27, 2006	—	Osaka, Japan	—	—	—	Before this match, Yoshino and Kishiwada defected to Muscle Outlaw'z. Vacated due to Cima, Yoshino and Kishiwada losing a title defense to the Muscle Outlaw'z Naruki Doi, Gamma and Naoki Tanizaki by disqualification on the Aggressive Gate tour.	
6	BxB Hulk, Cima (3) and Jack Evans	August 20, 2006	The Gate of Adventure	Sapporo, Japan	1	41	0	Defeated Do Fixer (Dragon Kid, Genki Horiguchi and Ryo Saito) in a tournament final.	
7	Do Fixer (Dragon Kid (3), Genki Horiguchi (3) and Ryo Saito (3))	September 30, 2006	Storm Gate	Osaka, Japan	3	50	0		
8	Muscle Outlaw'z; Naruki Doi (2), Gamma and Masato Yoshino (3)	November 19, 2006	Crown Gate tour	Fukuoka, Japan	1	37	0	Defeated Final M2K (K-ness, Yamato Onodera and Susumu Yokosuka) to become interim champions when the titles were vacated by Do Fixer due to Dragon Kid suffering from appendicitis. The interim reign was declared to be official on December 23, 2006, when a scheduled decision match against Do Fixer falls through due to Dragon's sustained illness.	
9	Pos.Hearts (BxB Hulk (2), Anthony W. Mori (2) and Super Shisa)	December 26, 2006	Live Gate.	Kobe, Japan	1	26	0		
10	Muscle Outlaw'z (Naruki Doi (3), Gamma (2) and Masato Yoshino (4))	January 21, 2007	Primal Gate	Kobe, Japan	2	63	3		
11	Typhoon (Cima (4), Ryo Saito (4) and Susumu Yokosuka)	March 25, 2007	Memorial Gate.	Tsu, Japan	1	15	1		
12	Muscle Outlaw'z (Naruki Doi (4), Gamma (3) and Magnitude Kishiwada (2))	April 9, 2007	Live Gate.	Kobe, Japan	1	6	0		
13	Typhoon (Cima (5), Ryo Saito (5) and Susumu Yokosuka (2))	April 15, 2007	Glorious Gate	Yokkaichi, Japan	2	25	0		
14	New Hazard (BxB Hulk (3), Cyber Kong and Shingo Takagi)	May 10, 2007	Aggressive Gate	Tokyo, Japan	1	64	1		
—	Vacated	July 13, 2007	—	—	—	—	—	Vacated due to Hulk suffering a jaw injury.	
15	Muscle Outlaw'z (Magnitude Kishiwada (3), Masato Yoshino (5) and Naruki Doi (5))	July 22, 2007	WrestleJam tour	Kobe, Japan	1	49	0	Defeated New Hazard (Cyber Kong, Jack Evans and Shingo Takagi) to win the vacant titles.	
16	Mushozoku (Don Fujii (2), K-ness and Masaaki Mochizuki)	September 9, 2007	Storm Gate	Fukuoka, Japan	1	168	3		
17	New Hazard (BxB Hulk (4), Cyber Kong (2) and Shingo Takagi (2))	February 24, 2008	Truth Gate	Fukui, Japan	2	80	1		
—	Vacated	May 14, 2008	—	Tokyo, Japan	—	—	—	Vacated after a title defense against Gamma, Genki Horiguchi and Yamato on the Aggressive Gate tour ended in a no contest when Takagi and Kong betrayed Hulk to form Real Hazard. An immediate decision match was made.	
18	Real Hazard (Gamma (4), Shingo Takagi (3) and Yamato)	May 14, 2008	Aggressive Gate tour	Tokyo, Japan	1	45	1	Defeated BxB Hulk, Naruki Doi and Masato Yoshino to win the vacant titles.	
19	Tozawajuku (Kenichiro Arai, Taku Iwasa and Shinobu)	June 28, 2008	Gate of Maximum	Nagoya, Japan	1	14	0		
20	Real Hazard (Gamma (5), Yasushi Kanda and Yamato (2))	July 12, 2008	Rainbow Gate	Akashi, Japan	1	78	2		
21	Zetsurins (Don Fujii (3), Magnitude Kishiwada (4) and Masaaki Mochizuki (2))	September 28, 2008	Memorial Gate.	Fukui, Japan	1	140	3		
22	KAMIKAZE (Dragon Kid (4), Shingo Takagi (4) and Taku Iwasa (2))	February 15, 2009	Truth Gate	Fukuoka, Japan	1	59	2		
23	Warriors-5 (Cima (6), Gamma (6) and Kagetora)	April 15, 2009	Gate of Passion	Tokyo, Japan	1	53	1		
24	World-1 (BxB Hulk (5), Masato Yoshino (6) and Pac)	June 7, 2009	Gate of Maximum	Nagoya, Japan	1	129	2		
25	Zetsurins (Akebono, Don Fujii (4) and Masaaki Mochizuki (3))	October 14, 2009	Gate of Victory	Tokyo, Japan	1	203	3		
26	Deep Drunkers (Kzy, Takuya Sugawara and Yasushi Kanda (2))	May 5, 2010	Dead or Alive 2010.	Nagoya, Japan	1	8	0		
27	Warriors (Cima (7), Gamma (7) and Genki Horiguchi (4))	May 13, 2010	Aggressive Gate	Tokyo, Japan	1	38	1		
28	World-1 (Naoki Tanizaki, Naruki Doi (6) and Pac (2))	June 20, 2010	Gate of Maximum	Fukuoka, Japan	1	4	0		
29	Warriors (Cima (8), Gamma (8) and Genki Horiguchi (5))	June 24, 2010	Gate of Maximum	Osaka, Japan	2	123	3		
30	Naoki Tanizaki (2), Takuya Sugawara (2) and Yasushi Kanda (3)	October 25, 2010	Gate of Victory	Miyazaki, Japan	1	62	1		
31	Blood Warriors (Cima (9), Dragon Kid (5) and Ricochet)	December 26, 2010	Final Gate 2010.	Fukuoka, Japan	1	140	5		
—	Vacated	May 15, 2011	—	Sapporo, Japan	—	—	—	Vacated due to Blood Warriors ejecting Dragon Kid from the group.	
32	Junction Three (Gamma (9), Masato Yoshino (7) and Yamato (3))	June 18, 2011	Champion Gate tour	Fukuoka, Japan	1	76	2	Defeated Blood Warriors (Cima, Naruki Doi and BxB Hulk) to win the vacant title.	
33	Blood Warriors (Kzy (2), Naoki Tanizaki (3) and Naruki Doi (7))	September 2, 2011	Storm Gate	Kobe, Japan	1	139	3		
—	Vacated	January 19, 2012	—	Tokyo, Japan	—	—	—	Vacated due to Kzy, Doi and Tomahawk T.T., replacing an injured Tanizaki, being disqualified in a title match against K-ness, Kenichiro Arai and Taku Iwasa.	
34	Jimmyz (Genki Horiguchi H.A.Gee.Mee!! (6), Jimmy Kanda (4) and Ryo "Jimmy" Saito (6))	March 3, 2012	Champion Gate	Osaka, Japan	1	64	1		
35	World-1 International (Masato Yoshino (8), Naruki Doi (8) and Pac (3))	May 6, 2012	Dead or Alive 2012.	Nagoya, Japan	1	77	5		
—	Vacated	July 22, 2012	—	Kobe, Japan	—	—	—	Title vacated when Pac leaves Dragon Gate for WWE.	
36	Mad Blankey (Akira Tozawa, BxB Hulk (6) and Naoki Tanisaki)	August 19, 2012	N/A	Fukuoka, Japan	1	63	2	Defeated Cima, Gamma and Magnitude Kishiwada in the finals of the 2012 Summer Adventure Tag League to win the vacant title. Naoki Tanisaki not to be confused with Naoki Tanizaki.	
37	Kaettekita Veteran-gun (Gamma (10), HUB and Magnitude Kishiwada (5))	October 21, 2012	The Gate of Destiny 2012	Osaka, Japan	1	27	1		
38	World-1 International (Masato Yoshino (9), Naruki Doi (9) and Shachihoko Boy)	November 17, 2012	Crown Gate 2012	Osaka, Japan	1	6	0	Won the title in a three-way match, which also included the Jimmyz (Genki Horiguchi H.A.Gee.Mee!!, Mr. Kyu Kyu Toyonaka Dolphin and Ryo "Jimmy" Saito.	
39	Jimmyz (Genki Horiguchi H.A.Gee.Mee!! (7), Mr. Kyu Kyu Toyonaka Dolphin/Naoki Tanizaki (4) and Ryo "Jimmy" Saito (7))	November 23, 2012	Crown Gate 2012	Saga, Japan	1	100	4	Dolphin won the right to change his name back to Naoki Tanizaki during the reign on January 27, 2013.	
40	World-1 International (Naruki Doi (10), Rich Swann and Shachihoko Boy (2))	March 3, 2013	Champion Gate 2013	Osaka, Japan	1	94	1		
41	M2K (Masaaki Mochizuki (4), Jimmy Susumu (3) and K-Ness (2))	June 5, 2013	Gate of Maximum	Tokyo, Japan	1	11	0		
42	Jimmyz (Genki Horiguchi H.A.Gee.Mee!! (8), Jimmy Kanda (5) and Ryo "Jimmy" Saito (8))	June 16, 2013	Champion Gate	Fukuoka, Japan	2	64	1		
43	Oretachi Veteran-gun (Dragon Kid (6), K-Ness (3) and Masaaki Mochizuki (5))	August 19, 2013	Gate of Generation	Miyazaki, Japan	1	19	0		
—	Vacated	September 7, 2013	—	Osaka, Japan	—	—	—	Title vacated after Dragon Kid suffered a knee injury.	
44	Mad Blankey (BxB Hulk (7), Cyber Kong (3) and Yamato (4))	October 6, 2013	Gate of Victory tour	Fukuoka, Japan	1	60	1	Defeated Monster Express (Akira Tozawa, Masato Yoshino and Shingo Takagi) to win the vacant title.	
45	Millennials (Eita, Flamita and T-Hawk (2))	December 5, 2013	Miracle Gate.	Tokyo, Japan	1	17	0		
46	Jimmyz (Jimmy Susumu (4), Mr. Kyu Kyu/Naoki Tanizaki Toyonaka/Dolphin (5) and Ryo "Jimmy" Saito (9))	December 22, 2013	The Final Gate 2013	Tokyo, Japan	1	55	3	Won the title in a three-way elimination match, which also included Oretachi Veteran-gun (Cima, Dragon Kid and Masaaki Mochizuki).	
—	Vacated	February 15, 2014	—	Nagoya, Japan	—	—	—	Title vacated after Saito was sidelined with a back injury.	
47	Jimmyz (Jimmy Kanda (6), Jimmy Susumu (5) and Mr. Kyu Kyu/Naoki Tanizaki/Toyonaka Dolphin (6))	February 20, 2014	Truth Gate	Kobe, Japan	1	24	1	Won the title by defeating Mad Blankey (Cyber Kong, Kzy and Naruki Doi) in a decision match.	
48	Millennials (Eita (2), T-Hawk (3) and U-T)	March 16, 2014	Memorial Gate in Wakayama.	Wakayama, Japan	1	90	1		
49	Mad Blankey (Cyber Kong (4), Kzy (3) and Naruki Doi (11))	June 14, 2014	Champion Gate in Hakata	Fukuoka, Japan	1	117	3	Won the title in a three-way elimination match, also involving Oretachi Veteran-gun (Don Fujii, Dragon Kid and Masaaki Mochizuki).	
50	Oretachi Veteran-gun (Cima (10), Don Fujii (5) and Gamma (11))	October 9, 2014	The Gate of Victory.	Tokyo, Japan	1	10	0		
51	Jimmyz (Genki Horiguchi H.A.Gee.Mee!! (9), Jimmy Susumu (6) and Ryo "Jimmy" Saito (10))	October 19, 2014	The Gate of Victory.	Yokkaichi, Japan	1	70	1		
52	Dia.Hearts (Big R Shimizu, Dragon Kid (7) and Masaaki Mochizuki (6))	December 28, 2014	The Final Gate 2014	Fukuoka, Japan	1	91	3		
53	Jimmyz (Genki Horiguchi H.A.Gee.Mee!! (10), Jimmy Kagetora (2) and Jimmy Susumu (7))	March 29, 2015	Glorious Gate 2015	Saga, Japan	1	77	2		
—	Vacated	June 14, 2015	—	Fukuoka, Japan	—	—	—	Title vacated after Kagetora was sidelined with an injury.	
54	Oretachi Veteran-gun (Cima (11), Don Fujii (6) and Gamma (12))	June 14, 2015	Champion Gate in Hakata 2015	Fukuoka, Japan	2	140	2	Defeated Jimmyz (Genki Horiguchi H.A.Gee.Mee!!, Jimmy Susumu and Ryo "Jimmy" Saito) to win the vacant title.	
—	Vacated	November 1, 2015	—	Osaka, Japan	—	—	—	Cima, Don Fujii, and Gamma voluntarily vacated the titles.	
55	Monster Express (Akira Tozawa (2), Masato Yoshino (10) and T-Hawk (4))	December 6, 2015	Fantastic Gate 2015	Hokkaido, Japan	1	273	5	Defeated Naruki Doi, Shingo Takagi and Yamato in a decision match for the vacant title.	
56	Jimmyz (Genki Horiguchi H.A.Gee.Mee!! (11), Jimmy Kanda (7) and Ryo "Jimmy" Saito (11))	September 4, 2016	Summer Adventure Tag League	Okinawa, Japan	3	107	1		
—	Vacated	December 20, 2016	—	Tokyo, Japan	—	—	—	Title vacated after Horiguchi suffered a rib injury.	
57	Jimmyz (Jimmy Kanda (8), Jimmy Susumu (8) and Ryo "Jimmy" Saito (12))	December 25, 2016	The Final Gate 2016	Fukuoka, Japan	1	69	0	Defeated the teams of Masato Yoshino, Kotoka and Ben-K, and also Cyber Kong, Mondai Ryu and El Lindaman in decision match to win the vacant titles.	
58	VerserK (Cyber Kong (5), Shingo Takagi (5) and T-Hawk (5))	March 4, 2017	Champion Gate 2017	Osaka, Japan	1	15	0		
—	Vacated	March 19, 2017	—	Nagoya, Japan	—	—	—	Titles vacated after Cyber Kong suffered a shoulder injury	
59	MaxiMuM (Ben-K, Big R Shimizu (2) and Naruki Doi (12))	March 20, 2017	Memorial Gate 2017	Wakayama, Japan	1	103	1	Defeated VerserK (Shingo Takagi, T-Hawk and "brother" YASSHI) to win the vacant titles.	
60	VerserK (El Lindaman, Shingo Takagi (6) and Takashi Yoshida (6))	July 1, 2017	Rainbow Gate 2017	Osaka, Japan	1	125	1		
61	Tribe Vanguard (BxB Hulk (8), Kzy (4) and Yamato (5))	November 3, 2017	The Gate Of Destiny 2017	Osaka, Japan	1	50	0	This was a three-way match, also involving MaxiMuM (Naruki Doi, Masato Yoshino and Kotoka).	
62	MaxiMuM (Masato Yoshino (11), Naruki Doi (13) and Jason Lee)	December 23, 2017	The Final Gate 2017	Fukuoka, Japan	1	134	2		
63	Natural Vibes (Kzy (5), Genki Horiguchi (12) and Susumu Yokosuka (9))	May 6, 2018	Dead or Alive 2018	Aichi, Japan	1	231	6		
64	R.E.D (Kazma Sakamoto, Takashi Yoshida (7) and Yasushi Kanda (9))	December 23, 2018	The Final Gate 2018	Fukuoka, Japan	1	210	3		
65	Strong Machine Gundan (Strong Machine J, Strong Machine F (7) and Strong Machine G (13))	July 21, 2019	Kobe Pro-Wrestling Festival 2019	Kobe, Japan	1	147	3	Strong Machine F formerly held the title under the name Don Fuji. Strong Machine G formerly held the title under the name Gamma.	
66	R.E.D. (Diamante, H.Y.O. and Takashi Yoshida (8))	December 15, 2019	Dragon Gate Final Gate 2019	Fukuoka, Japan	1	55	0	This was a three-way match also involving Genki Horiguchi, Kzy and Susumu Yokosuka.	
67	Team Toryumon (Dragon Kid (8), Kenichiro Arai (2) and Ryo Saito (2))	February 8, 2020	House show	Tokyo, Japan	1	21	0		
68	Team Dragon Gate (Ben-K (2), Dragon Dia and Strong Machine J (2))	February 29, 2020	Dragon Gate Champion Gate In Osaka 2020 - Day 1	Osaka, Japan	1	205	1		
69	R.E.D. (Diamante (2), Kazma Sakamoto (2) and Takashi Yoshida (9))	September 21, 2020	Dangerous Gate 2020	Tokyo, Japan	1	43	1		
—	Vacated	November 3, 2020	The Gate Of Destiny 2020	Osaka, Japan	—	—	—	Vacated due to Diamante suffering an injury. The exact length of this reign is uncertain.	
70	R.E.D. (Kazma Sakamoto (3), Kento Kobune/SB KENTo and Takashi Yoshida (10))	November 3, 2020	The Gate Of Destiny 2020	Osaka, Japan	1	71	2	Defeated Naruki Doi, Punch Tominaga and Ryotsu Shimizu to win the vacant titles.	
71	Natural Vibes (Kzy (6), Genki Horiguchi (13) and Susumu Yokosuka (10))	January 13, 2021	House show	Tokyo, Japan	2	112	1		
72	MASQUERADE (Dragon Dia (2), Jason Lee (2) and La Estrella)	May 5, 2021	Dead or Alive 2021	Aichi, Japan	1	138	2		
73	R.E.D. (Eita (3), Kaito Ishida and H.Y.O (2))	September 20, 2021	Dangerous Gate 2021	Tokyo, Japan	1	86	2		
74	MASQUERADE (Jason Lee (3), Kota Minoura and Shun Skywalker)	December 15, 2021	Fantastic Gate 2021	Tokyo, Japan	1	28	0		
75	R.E.D. (Eita (4), Kaito Ishida (2) and H.Y.O (3))	January 12, 2022	Open the New Year Gate 2022	Tokyo, Japan	2	<1	0		
—	Vacated	January 12, 2022	Open the New Year Gate 2022	Tokyo, Japan	—	—	—	Vacated due to H.Y.O and the rest of R.E.D. turning on Eita and Kaito Ishida, kicking them out of the unit.	
76	Natural Vibes (Kzy (7), U-T (2) and Jacky "Funky" Kamei)	February 20, 2022	Truth Gate 2022	Fukuoka, Japan	1	13	0	Defeated Z-Brats (H.Y.O, BxB Hulk and Shun Skywalker) in a tournament final to win the vacant title.	
77	Gold Class (Naruki Doi (14), Kaito Ishida (3) and Kota Minoura (2))	March 5, 2022	Champion Gate in Osaka 2022 - Day 1	Osaka, Japan	1	61	0	Minorita defended the titles alongside Doi, Ishida and Minoura, but is not recognized as champion.	
78	Los Perros del Mal de Japón (Eita (5), Nosawa Rongai and Kotaro Suzuki)	May 5, 2022	Dead or Alive 2022	Nagoya, Japan	1	33	0		
79	Stinger (Yoshinari Ogawa, Seiki Yoshioka and Yuya Susumu)	June 7, 2022	NOAH Star Navigation 2022	Tokyo, Japan	1	1	0		
80	Momo No Seishun Tag (Daisuke Harada, Atsushi Kotoge and Yo-Hey)	June 8, 2022	NOAH Star Navigation 2022	Tokyo, Japan	1	15	0		
—	Vacated	June 23, 2022	NOAH N Innovation	Tokyo, Japan	—	—	—	The titles were vacated after Daisuke Harada suffered a fever.	
81	Los Perros del Mal de Japón (Eita (6), Nosawa Rongai and Kotaro Suzuki)	June 23, 2022	NOAH N Innovation	Tokyo, Japan	2	37	2	Defeated Atsushi Kotoge, Extreme Tiger, and YO-HEY for the vacant titles.	
82	M3K (Masaaki Mochizuki (7), Susumu Mochizuki (11) and Mochizuki Jr.)	July 30, 2022	Kobe World 2022 - Ultimo Dragon Debut 35th Anniversary	Kobe, Japan	1	99	3	Yasushi Kanda was the special referee for this match.	
83	Z-Brats (Ishin Iihashi/Ishin, Kai and Shun Skywalker (2))	November 6, 2022	Gate of Destiny	Osaka, Japan	1	77	2		
84	Gold Class (Ben-K (3), BxB Hulk (9) and Kota Minoura (3))	January 22, 2023	Open The New Year Gate 2023	Kobe, Japan	1	118	3		
85	Natural Vibes (Kzy (8), Big Boss Shimizu (3) and Jacky "Funky" Kamei (2))	May 20, 2023	Hopeful Gate 2023	Sapporo, Japan	1	43	0		
86	Gold Class (Naruki Doi (15), Kota Minoura (4) and Minorita)	July 2, 2023	Kobe Festival 2023	Kobe, Japan	1	55	0		
—	Vacated	August 26, 2023	—	—	—	—	—	The titles were vacated after Minorita suffered a torn ACL.	
87	Dragon Kid (9), Punch Tominaga and Yamato (6)	October 6, 2023	Gate Of Victory 2023	Tokyo, Japan	1	79	2	Defeated Gold Class (Ben-K, Kota Minoura and Naruki Doi) and D'courage (Dragon Dia, Madoka Kikuta and Yuki Yoshioka) in a three way tournament final to win the vacant titles.	
88	Z-Brats (Ishin (2), Kai (2) and Yoshiki Kato)	December 24, 2023	Final Gate 2023	Fukuoka, Japan	1	62	3		
—	Vacated	February 24, 2024	—	—	—	—	—	The titles were vacated after Kato suffered a right knee injury.	
89	Z-Brats (Ishin (3), Kai (3) and Shun Skywalker (3))	March 3, 2024	Champion Gate In Osaka 2024	Osaka, Japan	2	67	0	Defeated D'courage (Dragon Dia, Madoka Kikuta and Ryoya Tanaka) to win the vacant titles.	
90	Natural Vibes (Big Boss Shimizu (4), Strong Machine J (3) and U-T (3))	May 9, 2024	Hopeful Gate 2024	Tokyo, Japan	1	215	6		
—	Vacated	December 10, 2024	—	Fukuoka, Japan	—	—	—	Titles were vacated after Shimizu was suspended due to a suspected contract violation.	
91	Paradox (BxB Hulk (10), Kagetora (3) and Susumu Yokosuka (12))	December 15, 2024	Final Gate 2024	Fukuoka, Japan	1	141	2	Defeated Z-Brats (Ishin, Kai and Yoshiki Kato) to win the vacant titles.	
92	Natural Vibes (Flamita (2), Kzy (9) and Strong Machine J (4))	May 5, 2025	Final Gate 2024	Fukuoka, Japan	1	30	0		
93	Z-Brats (Homare, Ishin (4) and Yoshiki Kato (2))	June 4, 2025	Rainbow Gate 2025	Fukuoka, Japan	1	39	0		
94	Bendito, Flamita (3) and Luis Mante (3)	July 13, 2025	Kobe Pro-Wrestling Festival 2025	Kobe, Japan	1	53	2	This was a three-way tag team match also involving Love And Peace (Jacky Kamei, Mochizuki Jr. and Riiita).	
95	Gajadokuro (Ishin (5), Kai (4) and Yoshiki Kato (3))	September 4, 2025	DG Storm Gate 2025 - Day 1	Tokyo, Japan	2	60	1	This was a ladder match. Ishin, Kai and Kato previously won the titles as part of Z-Brats.	
96	Psypatra (Shun Skywalker (4), Homare (2) and Gianni Valletta)	November 3, 2025	DG The Gate Of Destiny 2025 - Day 2	Osaka, Japan	1	23	0		
—	Vacated	November 26, 2025	—	—	—	—	—		
97	Love And Peace (Ben-K (4), Hyo (4) and Mochizuki Jr. (2))	December 27, 2025	DG Fantastic Gate 2025 - Day 13	Kobe, Japan	1	58	2	Defeated Gajadokuro (Jason Lee, Kai and Kota Minoura) and Natural Vibes (Kzy, Strong Machine J and U-T) in a three-way elimination tag team match to win the vacant titles.	
98	Natural Vibes (Kzy (10), GuC and Key)	February 23, 2026	DG Uno! Dos!! Tres!!!	Kobe, Japan	1	83	1	This was a three-way tag team match also involving Paradox (BxB Hulk, Yamato and Dragon Kid).	
99	Churaumi Saver, Gurukun Mask and Teelan Shisa	May 17, 2026	DG Mensore Gate	Naha, Japan	1	22	1		
—	Vacated	June 8, 2026	—	—	—	—	—		
100	Love And Peace (Hyo (5), Jacky Kamei (3) and Riiita (2))	July 20, 2026	DG Kobe Pro-Wrestling Festival	Kobe, Japan	1	108	2	Defeated Natural Vibes (GuC, Strong Machine J and U-T) to win the vacant titles.	
101	XenisS (El Cielo, Kota Minoura (5) and Yuki Yoshioka)	November 5, 2026	The Gate Of Evolution 2026	Tokyo, Japan	1	16+	0		

== Combined reigns ==
=== By team ===
As of November 21, 2026.

†	Indicates the current champion

Rank	Team	No. of reigns	Combined defenses	Combined days
1	Natural Vibes (Kzy, Genki Horiguchi and Susumu Yokosuka)	2	7	343
2	Blood Generation (Cima, Magnitude Kishiwada and Masato Yoshino)	1	3	319
3	Monster Express (Akira Tozawa, Masato Yoshino and T-Hawk)	1	5	273
4	Jimmyz (Genki Horiguchi H.A.Gee.Mee!!, Jimmy Kanda and Ryo "Jimmy" Saito)	3	3	235
5	Natural Vibes (Big Boss Shimizu, Strong Machine J and U-T)	1	6	215
6	R.E.D (Kazma Sakamoto, Takashi Yoshida and Yasushi Kanda)	1	3	210
7	Team Dragon Gate (Ben-K, Dragon Dia and Strong Machine J)	1	1	205
8	Zetsurins (Akebono, Don Fujii and Masaaki Mochizuki)	1	3	203
9	Do Fixer (Dragon Kid, Genki Horiguchi and Ryo Saito)	3	2	173
10	Mushozoku (Don Fujii, K-ness and Masaaki Mochizuki)	1	3	168
11	Warriors (Cima, Gamma and Genki Horiguchi)	2	4	161
12	Oretachi Veteran-gun (Cima, Don Fujii and Gamma)	2	2	150
13	Strong Machine Gundan (Strong Machine J, Strong Machine F and Strong Machine G)	1	3	147
14	New Hazard (BxB Hulk, Cyber Kong and Shingo Takagi)	2	2	144
15	Z-Brats (Ishin Iihashi/Ishin, Kai and Shun Skywalker)	2	2	143
16	Paradox (BxB Hulk, Kagetora and Susumu Yokosuka)	1	2	141
17	Blood Warriors (Cima, Dragon Kid and Ricochet)	1	5	140
17	Zetsurins (Don Fujii, Magnitude Kishiwada and Masaaki Mochizuki)	1	3	140
19	Blood Warriors (Kzy, Naoki Tanizaki and Naruki Doi)	1	3	139
20	MASQUERADE (Dragon Dia, Jason Lee and La Estrella)	1	2	138
21	MaxiMuM (Masato Yoshino, Naruki Doi and Jason Lee)	1	2	134
22	World-1 (BxB Hulk, Masato Yoshino and Pac)	1	2	129
23	VerserK (El Lindaman, Shingo Takagi and Takashi Yoshida)	1	1	125
24	Z-Brats/Gajadokuro (Ishin, Kai and Yoshiki Kato)	2	4	122
25	Gold Class (Ben-K, BxB Hulk and Kota Minoura)	1	3	118
26	Mad Blankey (Cyber Kong, Kzy and Naruki Doi)	1	3	117
27	Italian Connection (Milano Collection AT, Anthony W. Mori and Yossino)	1	2	108
27	Love And Peace (Hyo, Jacky Kamei and Riiita)	1	2	108
29	MaxiMuM (Ben-K, Big R Shimizu and Naruki Doi)	1	1	103
30	Muscle Outlaw'z (Naruki Doi, Gamma and Masato Yoshino)	2	3	100
30	Jimmyz (Genki Horiguchi H.A.Gee.Mee!!, Mr. Kyu Kyu/Toyonaka Dolphin/Naoki Tanizaki and Ryo "Jimmy" Saito)	1	4	100
32	M3K (Masaaki Mochizuki, Susumu Mochizuki and Mochizuki Jr.)	1	3	99
33	World-1 International (Naruki Doi, Rich Swann and Shachihoko Boy)	1	1	94
34	Dia.Hearts (Big R Shimizu, Dragon Kid and Masaaki Mochizuki)	1	3	91
35	Millennials (Eita, T-Hawk and U-T)	1	1	90
36	R.E.D. (Eita, Kaito Ishida and H.Y.O)	2	2	86
37	Natural Vibes (Kzy, GuC and Key)	1	0	83
38	Dragon Kid, Punch Tominaga and Yamato	1	2	79
39	Real Hazard (Gamma, Yasushi Kanda and Yamato)	1	2	78
40	World-1 International (Masato Yoshino, Naruki Doi and Pac)	1	5	77
40	Jimmyz (Genki Horiguchi H.A.Gee.Mee!!, Jimmy Kagetora and Jimmy Susumu)	1	2	77
42	Junction Three (Gamma, Masato Yoshino and Yamato)	1	2	76
43	R.E.D. (Kazma Sakamoto, Kento Kobune/SB KENTo and Takashi Yoshida)	1	2	71
44	Jimmyz (Genki Horiguchi H.A.Gee.Mee!!, Jimmy Susumu and Ryo "Jimmy" Saito)	1	1	70
44	Los Perros del Mal de Japón (Eita, Nosawa Rongai and Kotaro Suzuki)	2	2	70
46	Jimmyz (Jimmy Kanda, Jimmy Susumu and Ryo "Jimmy" Saito)	1	0	69
47	Mad Blankey (Akira Tozawa, BxB Hulk and Naoki Tanisaki)	1	2	63
48	Naoki Tanizaki, Takuya Sugawara and Yasushi Kanda	1	1	62
49	Gold Class (Naruki Doi, Kaito Ishida and Kota Minoura)	1	0	61
50	Mad Blankey (BxB Hulk, Cyber Kong and Yamato)	1	1	60
51	KAMIKAZE (Dragon Kid, Shingo Takagi and Taku Iwasa)	1	2	59
52	Love And Peace (Ben-K, Hyo and Mochizuki Jr.)	1	2	58
53	Jimmyz (Jimmy Susumu, Mr. Kyu Kyu/Naoki Tanizaki Toyonaka/Dolphin and Ryo "Jimmy" Saito)	1	3	55
53	Gold Class (Naruki Doi, Kota Minoura and Minorita)	1	0	55
53	R.E.D. (Diamante, H.Y.O. and Takashi Yoshida)	1	0	55
56	Warriors-5 (Cima, Gamma and Kagetora)	1	1	53
56	Bendito, Flamita and Luis Mante	1	2	53
58	Tribe Vanguard (BxB Hulk, Kzy and Yamato)	1	0	50
59	Muscle Outlaw'z (Magnitude Kishiwada, Masato Yoshino and Naruki Doi)	1	0	49
60	Real Hazard (Gamma, Shingo Takagi and Yamato)	1	1	45
61	R.E.D. (Diamante, Kazma Sakamoto and Takashi Yoshida)	1	1	43
61	Natural Vibes (Kzy, Big Boss Shimizu and Jacky "Funky" Kamei)	1	0	43
63	BxB Hulk, Cima and Jack Evans	1	0	41
64	Typhoon (Cima, Ryo Saito and Susumu Yokosuka)	2	2	40
65	Z-Brats (Homare, Ishin and Yoshiki Kato)	1	0	39
66	Natural Vibes (Flamita, Kzy and Strong Machine J)	1	0	30
67	MASQUERADE (Jason Lee, Kota Minoura and Shun Skywalker)	1	0	28
68	Kaettekita Veteran-gun (Gamma, HUB and Magnitude Kishiwada)	1	1	27
69	Pos.Hearts (BxB Hulk, Anthony W. Mori and Super Shisa)	1	0	26
70	Jimmyz (Jimmy Kanda, Jimmy Susumu and Mr. Kyu Kyu/Naoki Tanizaki/Toyonaka Dolphin)	1	1	24
71	Psypatra (Shun Skywalker, Homare and Gianni Valletta)	1	0	23
72	Churaumi Saver, Gurukun Mask and Teelan Shisa	1	1	22
73	Team Toryumon (Dragon Kid, Kenichiro Arai and Ryo Saito)	1	0	21
74	Oretachi Veteran-gun (Dragon Kid, K-Ness and Masaaki Mochizuki)	1	0	19
75	Millennials (Eita, Flamita and T-Hawk)	1	0	17
76	XenisS † (El Cielo, Kota Minoura and Yuki Yoshioka)	1	0	16+
77	Momo No Seishun Tag (Daisuke Harada, Atsushi Kotoge and Yo-Hey)	1	0	15
77	VerserK (Cyber Kong, Shingo Takagi and T-Hawk)	1	0	15
79	Tozawajuku (Kenichiro Arai, Taku Iwasa and Shinobu)	1	0	14
80	Natural Vibes (Kzy, U-T and Jacky "Funky" Kamei)	1	0	13
81	M2K (Masaaki Mochizuki, Jimmy Susumu and K-Ness)	1	0	11
82	Deep Drunkers (Kzy, Takuya Sugawara and Yasushi Kanda)	1	0	8
83	Blood Generation (Cima, Don Fujii and Naruki Doi)	1	1	6
83	Muscle Outlaw'z (Naruki Doi, Gamma and Magnitude Kishiwada)	1	0	6
83	World-1 International (Masato Yoshino, Naruki Doi and Shachihoko Boy)	1	0	6
86	World-1 (Naoki Tanizaki, Naruki Doi and Pac)	1	0	4
87	Stinger (Yoshinari Ogawa, Seiki Yoshioka and Yuya Susumu)	1	0	1

=== By wrestler ===
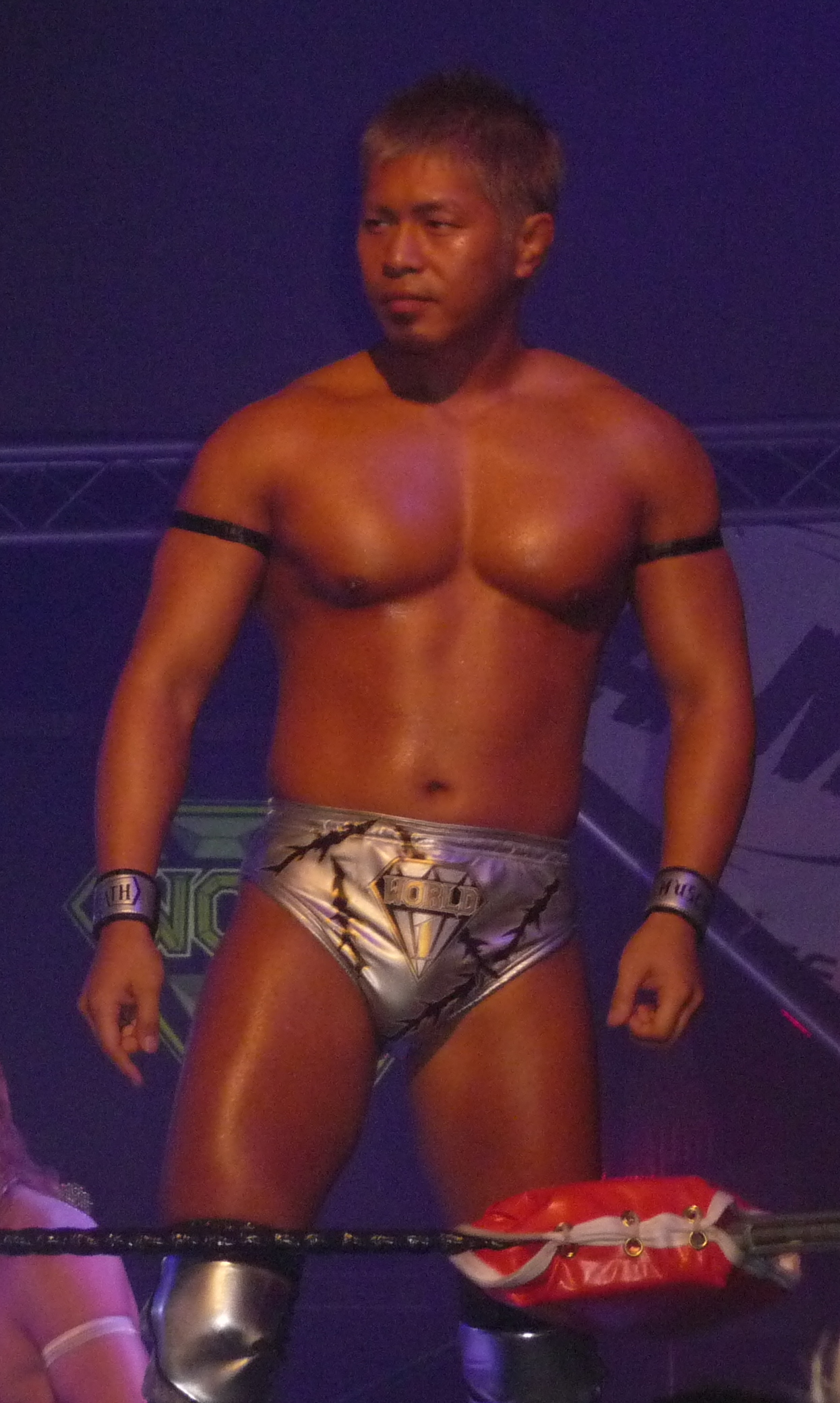
Record fifteen-time champion as individual, Naruki Doi.

Rank	Wrestler	No. of reigns	Combined defenses	Combined days
1	Yossino/Masato Yoshino	11	22	1,283
2	Genki Horiguchi H.A.Gee.Mee!!/Genki Horiguchi	13	18	1,158
3	Naruki Doi	15	19	952
4	Jimmy Susumu/Susumu Yokosuka/Susumu Mochizuki	12	20	929
5	Cima	11	17	910
6	Gamma/Strong Machine G	13	19	843
7	Cyber Kong/Takashi Yoshida	10	13	839
8	Kzy	10	13	826
9	Don Fujii/Strong Machine F	7	18	814
10	BxB Hulk	10	12	770
11	Ryo "Jimmy" Saito/Ryo Saito	13	14	762
12	Masaaki Mochizuki	7	15	731
13	Jimmy Kanda/Yasushi Kanda	9	10	686
14	Strong Machine J	4	10	607
15	Dragon Kid	9	14	581
16	Magnitude Kishiwada	5	7	541
17	Ben-K	4	7	484
18	T-Hawk	5	8	459
19	Big R Shimizu/Big Boss Shimizu	4	10	452
20	Yamato	6	8	388
21	Shingo Takagi	6	6	387
22	Mr. Kyu Kyu/Naoki Tanizaki/Toyonaka Dolphin	6	12	384
23	Dragon Dia	2	3	343
24	Akira Tozawa	2	7	336
25	Kazma Sakamoto	3	6	324
26	U-T	3	7	318
27	H.Y.O/Hyo	5	5	308
28	Ishin Iihashi/Ishin	5	6	305
29	Jason Lee	3	4	300
30	Kota Minoura †	5	3	278+
31	Kagetora/Jimmy Kagetora	3	5	271
32	Kai	4	6	266
33	Eita	6	5	263
34	Pac	3	7	210
35	Akebono	1	3	203
36	K-Ness	3	3	198
37	Shun Skywalker	4	2	194
38	Jacky "Funky" Kamei	3	2	164
39	Minorita	2	2	163
40	Yoshiki Kato	3	4	161
41	Mochizuki Jr.	2	5	157
42	Diamante/Luis Mante	3	3	151
43	Kaito Ishida	3	2	147
44	Ricochet	1	5	140
45	La Estrella	1	2	138
46	Anthony W. Mori	2	2	134
47	El Lindaman	1	1	125
48	Milano Collection AT	1	2	108
49	Shachihoko Boy	2	1	100
50	Flamita	3	2	100
51	Rich Swann	1	1	94
52	GuC	1	1	83
52	Key	1	1	83
54	Punch Tominaga	1	2	79
55	Taku Iwasa	2	2	73
56	Kento Kobune/SB KENTo	1	2	71
57	Takuya Sugawara	2	2	70
57	Nosawa Rongai	2	2	70
57	Kotaro Suzuki	2	2	70
60	Homare	2	0	62
61	Bendito	1	2	53
62	Jack Evans	1	0	41
63	Kenichiro Arai	2	0	35
64	HUB	1	1	27
65	Super Shisa	1	0	26
66	Gianni Valletta	1	0	23
67	Churaumi Saver	1	1	22
67	Gurukun Mask	1	1	22
67	Teelan Shisa	1	1	22
70	El Cielo †	1	0	16+
70	Yuki Yoshioka †	1	0	16+
72	Atsushi Kotoge	1	0	15
72	Daisuke Harada	1	0	15
72	Yo-Hey	1	0	15
75	Shinobu	1	0	14
76	Yoshinari Ogawa	1	0	1
76	Seiki Yoshioka	1	0	1
76	Yuya Susumu	1	0	1

== See also ==
- WAR World Six-Man Tag Team Championship
- UWA World Trios Championship
- KO-D 6-Man Tag Team Championship
