= Muscle Outlaw'z =

Professional wrestling stable

Stable
- Members: Genki Horiguchi; Gamma; Yasushi Kanda; YAMATO; Dr. Muscle; Cyber Kong; Kinta Tamaoka; Jack Evans; Naruki Doi; Masato Yoshino; Naoki Tanizaki; Magnitude Kishiwada
- Debut: April 23, 2006
- Disbanded: May 14, 2008

Muscle Outlaw'z, or MO'z for short, was a professional wrestling stable in the Japanese promotion Dragon Gate, formed on April 23, 2006. It was founded by former Blood Generation members Naruki Doi, Masato Yoshino, Naoki Tanizaki, and Gamma, intending to compete with CIMA's faction. Other members included Genki Horiguchi, Magnitude Kishiwada, Yasushi Kanda, Kinta Tamaoka, Cyber Kong, and YAMATO.

== History ==
At one time the main heel and largest faction in Dragon Gate, the Muscle Outlaw'z are one of the most successful factions in Dragon Gate history, with several championships to their credit. Being heels, they mainly utilized dirty and underhanded tactics to win their matches, and though they specialized in group tactics, they could hold their own in singles competition.

MO'z started when Magnitude Kishiwada got injured in February 2006 and had to take some time off, but he promised his stablemates in Blood Generation that "a friend" would come and take his place while he recuperated. On March 19, that "friend" turned out to be his old Osaka Pro Wrestling running buddy Gamma. Gamma and the stable's leader CIMA took a dislike to each other almost immediately, and their constant butting of heads prompted CIMA to kick him out of the faction on April 12. However, Gamma would be joined in his departure by Naruki Doi, Masato Yoshino, and the newly recruited Naoki Tanisaki. Doi and Gamma then defeated CIMA and Don Fujii on April 23 in a tag match, winning full rights to the Blood Generation name, but they immediately renounced the name, instead establishing the "Muscle Outlaw'z". Their roster was bolstered when Kishiwada joined them when he returned from his injury, and when Genki Horiguchi defected from Do FIXER on February 4, 2007. Referee Kinta Tamaoka also joined their ranks in May 2006, acting as their own personal referee. He allowed the MO'z members to break the rules and he used fast counts when they pinned their opponents, and he also refused to count pinfalls done to MO'z members and would sometimes even attack opponents.

The group became the refuge for any heel wrestler visiting Dragon Gate, their membership list including Pentagon Black, Kevin Steen, Muscle Gang, and Arik Cannon. This has caused their membership to become the highest in Dragon Gate history.

Kishiwada would become more of a part-time member, spending increasing amounts of time away from Dragon Gate, and Naoki Tanisaki would eventually leave the group and the promotion altogether in late 2006 to become a freelancer, with the El Dorado Wrestling promotion as his main haunt.

Masato Yoshino and Genki Horiguchi competed in MTV2's Wrestling Society X as "Team Dragon Gate". They began on a losing streak, until they were "reprogrammed" by Sakoda. They returned with a new dark edge and won their last two matches before WSX was canceled by MTV. Team Dragon Gate was active while Horiguchi was still aligned with Do FIXER in Dragon Gate.

As September 2007 approached, Kinta's relationship with the other members of MO'z began to deteriorate after he cost the group several matches due to misaimed protein powder attacks. After he took the fall in a tag match where he and Gamma lost their hair to CIMA and Dragon Kid, Gamma had had enough, and challenged Kinta to a match on September 22 where the loser would be banished from MO'z. Gamma lost the match after all of the MO'z members surprisingly aided Kinta, and so he was banished from the group, and then he had his contract with Dragon Gate annulled the next day. A month later, on October 21, when the MO'z stormed the ring after a tag match between Typhoon and New Hazard and assaulted both stables, Gamma rushed to the ring to save the day and joined with Typhoon. This, however, was short-lived, as he quickly gave CIMA, Typhoon's leader, a Tombstone Piledriver and rejoined MO'z, and then the group mobbed Kinta and booted him out. This culminated in a six-man tag match later that night between Genki Horiguchi, Masato Yoshino, and Gamma against all three referees of Dragon Gate with Yasushi Kanda as the special referee. MO'z would go on to win the match after Kanda interfered on the Outlawz' behalf, hitting Kinta with a blue box right before he could hit his finisher. He was then revealed as the latest MO'z member.

Championship success abounded in the group. They dominated the Open the Triangle Gate title scene, winning the belts four times. Masato Yoshino and Genki Horiguchi won the Open the Brave Gate title on separate occasions in 2007. Naruki Doi would win the ROH World Tag Team Titles with an unaligned Shingo Takagi in March 2007. The group’s greatest success came from the tandem of Doi and Yoshino. Dubbed "Speed Muscle", an amalgamation of their nicknames Speed Star (Yoshino) and Bosou Muscle (Doi), the duo would become the first Dragon Gate Open the Twin Gate Champions in 2007, and later in the year they would add the WAR I-J Heavyweight Tag Team Championship and Pro Wrestling NOAH GHC Junior Heavyweight Tag Team Championship to their collection.

On April 17, 2008, New Hazard's YAMATO joined MO'z after attacking his tag partner Naoki Tanisaki (who had recently returned but didn't re-align with MO'z) in a match against Gamma and Genki Horiguchi. On May 5, after weeks of dissension, Doi and Yoshino split from the Outlaw'z, turning face after costing Yasushi Kanda his hair in a Mascara contra Cabellera (Mask vs. Hair) Cage Survival Six-Way Match. Nine days later, Shingo Takagi and Cyber Kong turned on BxB Hulk, ending New Hazard, and they proceeded to join with the remaining heel members of Muscle Outlaw'z to form Real Hazard, effectively ending Muscle Outlaw'z after two years of activity. Dr. Muscle, however, has vowed to carry on the MO'z name until the end of time.

== Championships and accomplishments ==
- Dragon Gate
  - Open the Brave Gate Championship (4 times) – Horiguchi (1), Yoshino (2), Gamma (1)
  - Open the Triangle Gate Championship (4 times) Doi, Gamma and Yoshino (2), Doi, Gamma and Kishiwada (1), Doi, Kishiwada and Yoshino (1)
  - Open the Twin Gate Championship (1 time) – Doi and Yoshino
  - GHC Junior Heavyweight Tag Team Championship (1 time) – Doi and Yoshino
  - I-J Heavyweight Tag Team Championship (1 time) – Doi and Yoshino
  - King of Gate (2007) – Gamma
  - Summer Adventure Tag League (2007) – Doi and Yoshino
- Wrestle Association R
  - WAR International Junior Heavyweight Championship (1 time) – Black
