= Riiita =

Japanese professional wrestler

Minorita
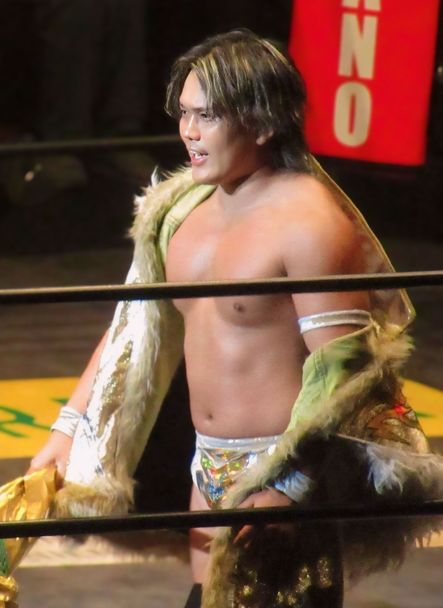
- Minorita in July 2024

Personal information
- Born: August 14, 1999 (age 27) Kōshū, Japan

Professional wrestling career
- Ring names: Takumi Hayakawa; Minorita; Riiita
- Billed height: 156 cm (5 ft 1 in)
- Billed weight: 67 kg (148 lb)
- Trained by: Dragon Gate Dojo
- Debut: 2021

Takumi Hayakawa (早川 匠, Hayakawa Takumi), better known by his ring name Minorita (ミノリータ, Minorīta) and currently performing as Riiita, is a Japanese professional wrestler currently signed to Dragon Gate. He is a former Open the Brave Gate Champion and Open the Triangle Gate Champion.

== Professional wrestling career ==
=== Dragon Gate (2021–present) ===
Hayakawa made his professional wrestling debut in Dragon Gate on the eighth night of the Gate Of Victory 2021 from October 24, where he teamed up with Naruki Doi in a losing effort against Don Fujii and Jacky "Funky" Kamei as a result of a tag team match. Shortly after just one year following his professional debut, he eventually began chasing various championships, and capturing the Open the Brave Gate Championship at Final Gate 2022 on December 25 by defeating H.Y.O. At Hopeful Gate 2023 on May 20, he alongside Kota Minoura and Naruki Doi defeated Natural Vibes (Kzy, Big Boss Shimizu and Jacky Kamei) to win the Open the Triangle Gate Championship.

Hayakawa is known for competing in various of the promotion's signature events, such as the King of Gate tournament, making his first appearance at the 2022 edition where he defeated Takashi Yoshida in the first rounds but fell short to Kzy in the second ones. He also competed in a battle royal for a second chance in the tournament, won by Kota Minoura and also involving various other opponents such as Dragon Kid, Susumu Mochizuki, Yamato, Keisuke Okuda, Kaito Ishida, Eita, Madoka Kikuta and others. At the 2023 edition he is scheduled to face Ishin in the first rounds.

Hayakawa competed in the Gate of Destiny series of pay-per-views, which is considered to be the promotion's top yearly event. He made his first appearance at the 2021 edition where he teamed up with Masaaki Mochizuki and Yasushi Kanda to defeat Último Dragón and Iihashi Brothers (Riki Iihashi and Ishin Iihashi). At the 2022 edition, he teamed up with his "Gold Class" stablemates Kota Minoura and Ben-K in a losing effort against Z-Brats (BxB Hulk and Diamante) in a 3-on-2 handicap match.

=== Independent circuit (2022–present) ===
Hayakawa often makes appearances for various promotions of the Japanese independent scene as a developmental talent sent by Dragon Gate. He took part in a cross-over event promoted by them alongside Pro Wrestling Noah on November 11, 2022, the NOAH Global Dream where he teamed up with Gold Class stablemate Ben-K and unsuccessfully competed in a five-way tag team match won by Ishin and Manabu Soya and also involving Los Perros del Mal de Japón (Eita and Super Crazy), M3K (Susumu Mochizuki and Yasushi Kanda), and Big Boss Shimizu and Mohammed Yone. He made his first appearance in Pro Wrestling Zero1 at ZERO1 Yamanashi Pro Wrestling Festival Vol. 5 on November 13, 2022, where he teamed up with Tsugutaka Sato in a losing effort against Koji Doi and Shoki Kitamura. In Michinoku Pro Wrestling, he made his debut at Michinoku Pro Tanabata Pro-Wrestling Festival on July 8, 2023, where he fell short to Jacky "Funky" Kamei and Taro Nohashi in a three-way match.

== Championships and accomplishments ==
- Dragon Gate
  - Open the Brave Gate Championship (1 time)
  - Open the Twin Gate Championship (1 time) – with Jacky Kamei
  - Open the Triangle Gate Championship (2 times) – with Naruki Doi and Kota Minoura (1), HYO and Jacky Kamei (1)
