= Open the Dream Gate Championship =

Professional wrestling championship

- Current title design (2020–present)

Details
- Promotion: Dragon Gate
- Date established: July 4, 2004
- Current champion: Yoshiki Kato
- Date won: October 2, 2026
Statistics
- First champion: Cima
- Most reigns: Yamato (6 reigns)
- Longest reign: Cima (574 days)
- Shortest reign: Jimmy Susumu (21 days)
- Oldest champion: Masaaki Mochizuki (47 years, 8 months and 1 day)
- Youngest champion: Madoka Kikuta (23 years, 7 months and 15 days)

The Open the Dream Gate Championship (オープン・ザ・ドリームゲート王座, Ōpun za Dorīmugēto Ōza) is a professional wrestling championship created and promoted by the Japanese promotion Dragongate. The wrestler who holds it is considered the top singles wrestler in Dragongate. It was created on July 4, 2004 when Cima was awarded the title as a result of being the last Último Dragón Gym Champion.

== History ==
The inaugural champion was Cima, who was awarded the championship for being the last Último Dragón Gym Champion. He is still the longest reigning champion as of today at 574 days. Title reigns are determined either by professional wrestling matches between different wrestlers involved in pre-existing scripted feuds, plots, and storylines, or by scripted circumstances. Wrestlers were portrayed as either villains or heroes as they followed a series of tension-building events, which culminated in a wrestling match or series of matches for the championship.

=== Belt design ===
Former championship design (2015–2020)

The title belt's face has a "gate" on it represented by a hinged metallic door that contains a plate with the titleholder's name. Any official challenger for the belt carries a key used to open the gate, and should they win the title, then they can open the gate and put their name inside it. However, if the title is successfully defended, then the key is added to the main plate of the belt as a symbol of the respective successful defense. The original title belt was lost following Dragongate's July 20, 2015 event, which forced the promotion to create a new belt, which debuted on August 16, 2015.

== Reigns ==
As of November 17, 2026, there have been a total of 23 recognized champions who have had a combined 44 official reigns. The current champion is Yoshiki Kato who is in his first reign.

Key
No.	Overall reign number
Reign	Reign number for the specific champion
Days	Number of days held
Defenses	Number of successful defenses
+	Current reign is changing daily

No.	Champion	Championship change			Reign statistics			Notes	Ref.
No.	Champion	Date	Event	Location	Reign	Days	Defenses	Notes	Ref.
Dragon Gate
1	Cima	July 4, 2004	Vo Aniversario	Kobe, Japan	1	165	1	Cima was awarded the title as a result of winning the last Último Dragón Gym Championship match at Toryumon Japan's fifth anniversary event; this was officially announced in Tokyo on August 1, 2004.	
2	Masaaki Mochizuki	December 16, 2004	The Gate of Legend	Tokyo, Japan	1	323	4		
3	Magnitude Kishiwada	November 4, 2005	Crown Gate	Osaka, Japan	1	112	2		
4	Ryo Saito	February 24, 2006	Truth Gate	Tokyo, Japan	1	58	0		
5	Susumu Yokosuka	April 23, 2006	Glorious Gate: Final Day	Tokyo, Japan	1	214	3		
6	Don Fujii	November 23, 2006	Crown Gate: Osaka Special	Osaka, Japan	1	122	1		
7	Jushin Thunder Liger	March 25, 2007	Memorial Gate 2007	Tsu, Japan	1	98	1		
8	Cima	July 1, 2007	Kobe Pro-Wrestling Festival 2007	Kobe, Japan	2	364	6		
—	Vacated	June 29, 2008	—	—	—	—	—	Vacated due to Cima suffering a neck injury.	
9	Shingo Takagi	July 27, 2008	Kobe Pro-Wrestling Festival 2008	Kobe, Japan	1	154	3	Takagi defeated B×B Hulk to win the vacant championship.	
10	Naruki Doi	December 28, 2008	The Final Gate	Fukuoka, Japan	1	449	8		
11	Yamato	March 22, 2010	Compilation Gate 2010	Tokyo, Japan	1	111	3		
12	Masato Yoshino	July 11, 2010	Kobe Pro-Wrestling Festival 2010	Kobe, Japan	1	277	4		
13	Masaaki Mochizuki	April 14, 2011	Champion Gate: Final Day	Tokyo, Japan	2	255	6		
14	Cima	December 25, 2011	The Final Gate 2011	Fukuoka, Japan	3	574	15		
15	Shingo Takagi	July 21, 2013	Kobe Pro-Wrestling Festival 2013	Kobe, Japan	2	33	0		
16	Yamato	August 23, 2013	The Gate of Generation	Tokyo, Japan	2	48	1		
17	Masato Yoshino	October 10, 2013	The Gate of Victory	Tokyo, Japan	2	143	4		
18	Ricochet	March 2, 2014	Champion Gate in Osaka 2014	Osaka, Japan	1	64	1		
19	Yamato	May 5, 2014	Dead or Alive 2014	Nagoya, Japan	3	76	2		
20	B×B Hulk	July 20, 2014	Kobe Pro-Wrestling Festival 2014	Kobe, Japan	1	329	7	On August 5, 2014, Naruki Doi defeated B×B Hulk in a 4-on-1 handicap match, where he teamed with Cyber Kong, Kzy and Mondai Ryu. Afterwards Doi was recognized as an interim champion, pending a rematch. On August 17, B×B Hulk defeated Doi to resume his reign and make his first successful title defense.	
21	Masato Yoshino	June 14, 2015	Champion Gate 2015 in Hakata	Fukuoka, Japan	3	63	1		
22	Shingo Takagi	August 16, 2015	Dangerous Gate 2015	Tokyo, Japan	3	182	3	Takagi's defense against Gamma on December 3, 2015, was declared a no contest and an unsuccessful defense due to massive interference by VerserK.	
23	Jimmy Susumu	February 14, 2016	Truth Gate 2016	Fukuoka, Japan	2	21	0	Previously known as Susumu Yokosuka.	
24	Shingo Takagi	March 6, 2016	Champion Gate 2016 in Osaka	Osaka, Japan	4	140	1		
25	Yamato	July 24, 2016	Kobe Pro-Wrestling Festival 2016	Kobe, Japan	4	421	6		
26	Masaaki Mochizuki	September 18, 2017	Dangerous Gate 2017	Tokyo, Japan	3	265	5		
27	Masato Yoshino	June 10, 2018	King of Gate 2018	Fukuoka, Japan	4	177	4		
28	Pac	December 4, 2018	Fantastic Gate 2018	Tokyo, Japan	1	229	2		
29	Ben-K	July 21, 2019	Kobe Pro-Wrestling Festival 2019	Kobe, Japan	1	147	3		
30	Naruki Doi	December 15, 2019	The Final Gate 2019	Fukuoka, Japan	2	231	2		
31	Eita	August 2, 2020	Memorial Gate 2020 in Wakayama	Wakayama, Japan	1	105	1		
32	Shun Skywalker	November 15, 2020	Kobe Pro-Wrestling Festival 2020	Kobe, Japan	1	259	5		
33	Yamato	August 1, 2021	Speed Star Final	Kobe, Japan	5	147	3		
34	Kai	December 26, 2021	The Final Gate 2021	Fukuoka, Japan	1	216	3		
35	Yuki Yoshioka	July 30, 2022	Kobe World 2022: Último Dragón Debut 35th Anniversary	Kobe, Japan	1	166	5		
36	Shun Skywalker	January 12, 2023	Open the New Year Gate 2023	Tokyo, Japan	2	113	1		
37	Madoka Kikuta	May 5, 2023	Dead or Alive 2023	Aichi, Japan	1	233	3		
38	Luis Mante	December 24, 2023	The Final Gate 2023	Fukuoka, Japan	1	163	3	This was a three-way match, also featuring Shun Skywalker	
39	Ben-K	June 4, 2024	Rainbow Gate 2024	Tokyo, Japan	2	47	0		
40	Yamato	July 21, 2024	Kobe Pro-Wrestling Festival 2024	Kobe, Japan	6	357	8		
41	Shun Skywalker	July 13, 2025	Kobe Pro-Wrestling Festival 2025	Kobe, Japan	3	35	0		
42	Madoka Kikuta	August 17, 2025	DG Dangerous Gate 2025	Tokyo, Japan	2	337	5		
43	Kzy	July 20, 2026	DG Kobe Pro-Wrestling Festival	Kobe, Japan	1	74	1		
44	Yoshiki Kato	October 2, 2026	DG The Gate Of Victory 2026	Tokyo, Japan	1	46+	0		

== Combined reigns ==
As of November 17, 2026.

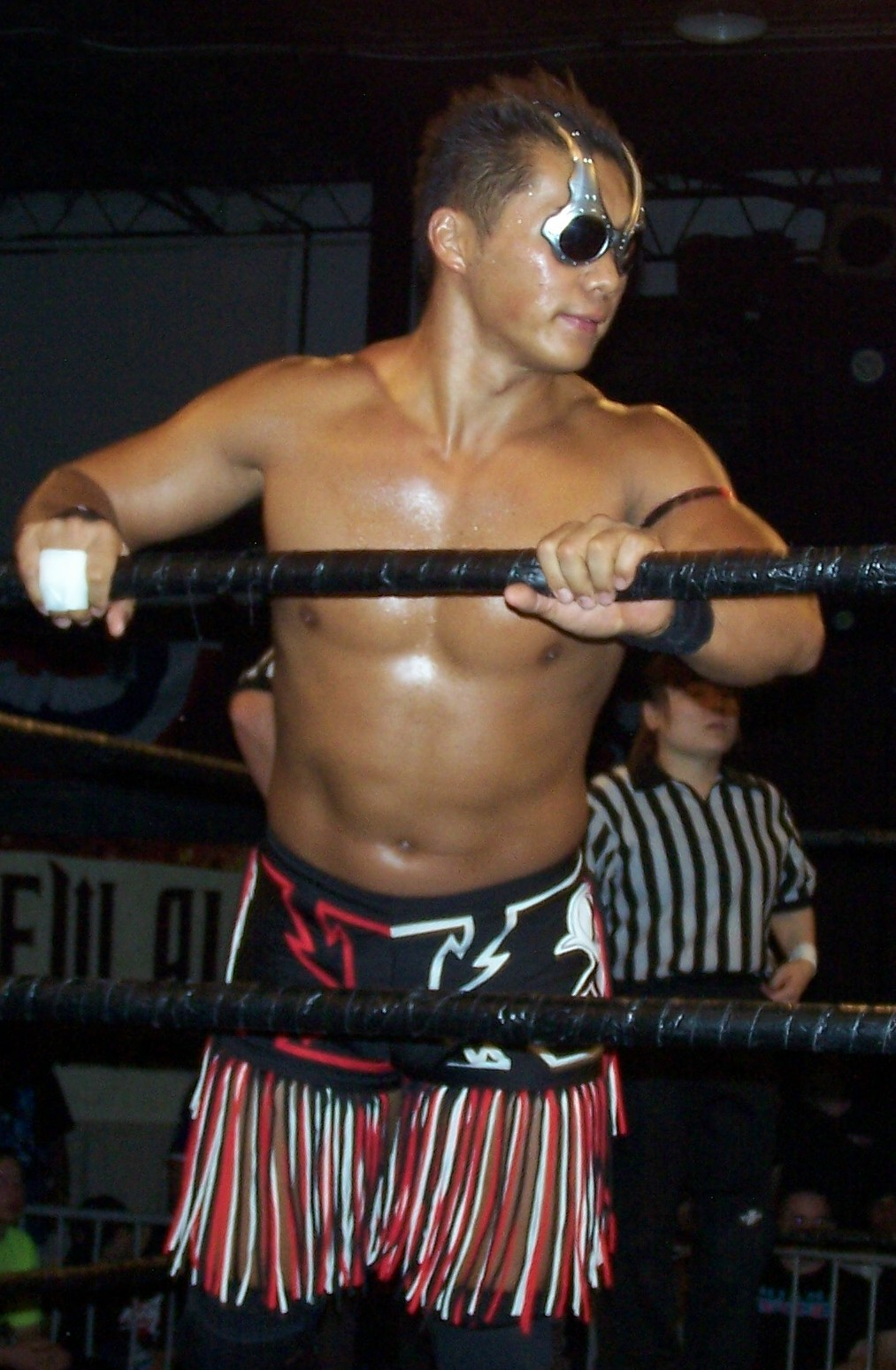
Inaugural and longest reigning at 574 days, Cima.

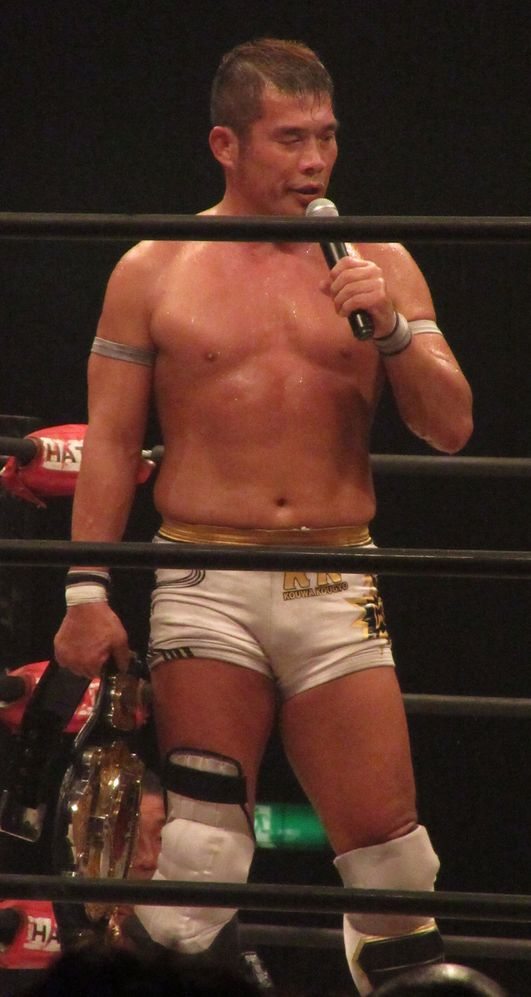
Three-time champion shown here with the first design of the belt, Masaaki Mochizuki.

†	Indicates the current champion

Rank	Wrestler	No. of reigns	Combined defenses	Combined days
1	Yamato	6	23	1,160
2	Cima	3	22	1,103
3	Masaaki Mochizuki	3	15	843
4	Naruki Doi	2	10	680
5	Masato Yoshino	4	13	660
6	Madoka Kikuta	2	8	570
7	Shingo Takagi	4	7	509
8	Shun Skywalker	3	6	407
9	B×B Hulk	1	7	329
10	Susumu Yokosuka/Jimmy Susumu	2	3	235
11	Pac	1	2	229
12	Kai	1	3	216
14	Ben-K	2	3	194
13	Yuki Yoshioka	1	5	166
15	Luis Mante	1	3	163
16	Don Fujii	1	1	122
17	Magnitude Kishiwada	1	2	112
18	Eita	1	1	105
19	Jushin Thunder Liger	1	1	98
20	Kzy	1	1	74
21	Ricochet	1	1	64
22	Ryo Saito	1	0	58
23	Yoshiki Kato †	1	0	46+

== See also ==
- Dragongate
- Open the Freedom Gate Championship
