= Strong Machine J =

Japanese professional wrestler

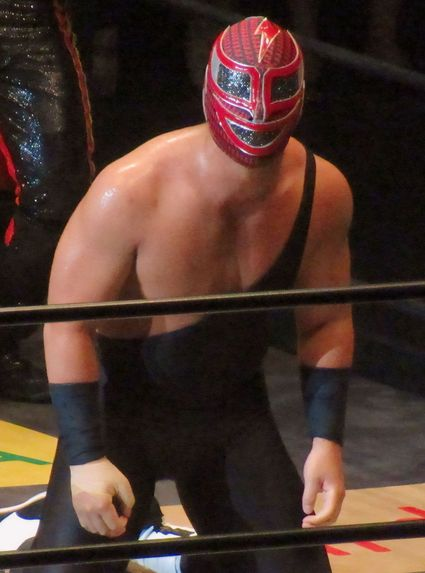
- Strong Machine J in July 2024

Personal information
- Born: Yokohama, Japan
- Family: Junji Hirata (father)

Professional wrestling career
- Ring name: Strong Machine J
- Trained by: Dragon Gate Dojo
- Debut: 2019

Strong Machine J (ストロングマシーン・J, Sutorongu Mashīn J) is a Japanese luchador enmascarado (masked professional wrestler) currently signed to the Japanese professional wrestling promotion Dragongate. He is a former Open the Triangle Gate Champion.

== Professional wrestling career ==
=== Independent circuit (2019–present) ===
Strong Machine J has occasionally competed for various promotions on the Japanese independent scene. At W-1 Wonder Carnival, an event promoted by Wrestle-1 on December 31, 2019, he teamed with Strong Machine F and Strong Machine G to defeat Alejandro, Ganseki Tanaka and Masayuki Kono.

At NOAH Global Dream, an event promoted by Pro Wrestling Noah on November 11, 2022, he teamed with Jason Lee and U-T in a losing effort against Atsushi Kotoge, Dante Leon and Punch Tominaga.

=== Dragongate (2019–present) ===
Strong Machine J made his professional wrestling debut in Dragongate on the third night of Dragon Gate: The Gate of Passion 2019 on April 10. He aligned himself with Strong Machine F and Strong Machine G to form the "Strong Machine Gundan" stable and defeated Natural Vibes (Genki Horiguchi, Kzy and Susumu Yokosuka) in a six-man tag team match.

During his tenure with the promotion, he became a member of two additional stables: "Team Dragon Gate" and "Natural Vibes". His first championship victory came at the Kobe Pro-Wrestling Festival 2019 on July 21, where he, Strong Machine F, and Strong Machine G won the Open the Triangle Gate Championship by defeating R.E.D. (Kazma Sakamoto, Takashi Yoshida and Yasushi Kanda).

He has participated in several of the promotion’s signature events, including the King of Gate tournament. He made his first appearance at the 2020 edition, where he was eliminated in the first round by Eita. In the 2022 edition, he defeated La Estrella in the first round but was eliminated by Shun Skywalker in the second. He later competed in a resurrection battle royal for a second chance in the tournament, which was won by Kota Minoura and also featured BxB Hulk, Kai, Kaito Ishida, Keisuke Okuda, Naruki Doi, Takashi Yoshida, Yamato, Dragon Kid, and other previously eliminated participants.

Strong Machine J has also competed in the Gate of Destiny series of pay-per-view events, considered Dragon Gate’s premier annual show. He made his first appearance at the 2019 edition, teaming with Strong Machine F and Strong Machine G to successfully defend the Open the Triangle Gate Championship against MaxiMuM (Dragon Kid, Jason Lee and Naruki Doi).

At the 2020 edition, he teamed with Ben-K and Dragon Dia as "Team Dragon Gate" to defeat R.E.D. (BxB Hulk, Dia Inferno and H.Y.O). At the 2021 edition, he competed in a battle royal won by Jason Lee, which also included Ho Ho Lun, Yosuke Santa Maria, Mondai Ryu, Super Shisa, Punch Tominaga, Konomama Ichikawa and Shachihoko Boy.

At the 2022 edition, he teamed with "Natural Vibes" stablemate Big Boss Shimizu to unsuccessfully challenge D'courage (Dragon Dia and Madoka Kikuta) for the Open the Twin Gate Championship.

== Personal life ==
Strong Machine J is the son of former professional wrestler Junji Hirata. He developed his ring name and in-ring persona as a tribute to his father's "Super Strong Machine" character.

== Championships and accomplishments ==
- Dragon Gate
  - Open the Triangle Gate Championship (4 times) – with Ben-K and Dragon Dia (1), Strong Machine F and Strong Machine G (1), Big R Shimizu and U-T (1) and Flamita and Kzy (1)
  - Ashiyanikki Cup Six Man Tag Team Tournament (2020) – with Ben-K and Dragon Dia
- Pro Wrestling Illustrated
  - Ranked No. 277 of the top 500 singles wrestlers in the PWI 500 in 2024
- Tokyo Sports Puroresu Awards
  - Rookie Of The Year (2019)
