= Dragon Dia =

Japanese professional wrestler

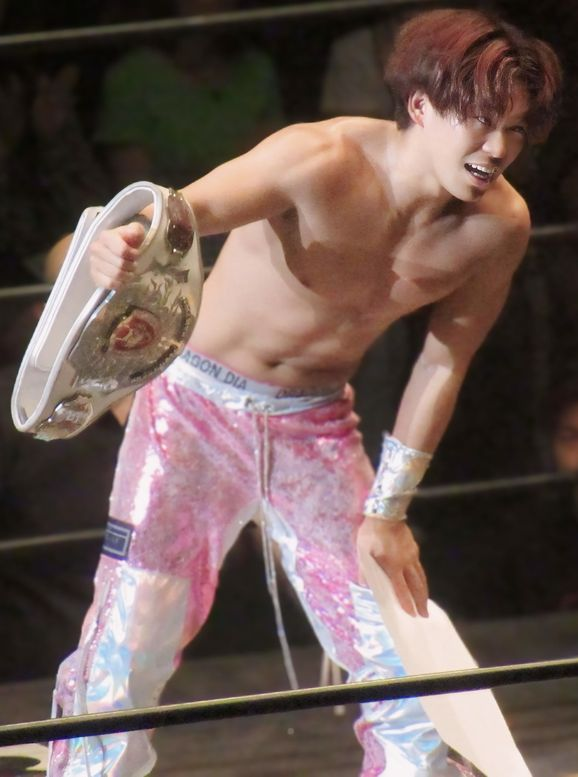
- Dia in July 2024

Personal information
- Born: October 31, 1998 (age 27) Suzaka, Japan

Professional wrestling career
- Ring name(s): Dia; Dragon Dia
- Billed height: 168 cm (5 ft 6 in)
- Billed weight: 70 kg (154 lb)
- Trained by: Dragon Kid
- Debut: 2018

Dragon Dia (ドラゴン・ダイヤ, Doragon Daiya) is a Japanese professional wrestler. He is best known for his time in the Japanese promotion Dragongate, where he is a former Open the Brave Gate Champion, Open the Twin Gate Champion and Open the Triangle Gate Champion.

== Professional wrestling career ==
=== Dragon Gate (2018–2026) ===
Dia made his professional wrestling debut in Dragon Gate on the first night of the Gate Of Evolution 2018 from November 6, where he teamed up with his coach Dragon Kid in a losing effort against R.E.D. (Eita and Yasushi Kanda). After two years of rookie status, he eventually began chasing various championships, and capturing the Open the Triangle Gate Championship alongside Ben-K and Strong Machine J from Team Toryumon (Dragon Kid, Kenichiro Arai and Ryo Saito) on February 29, 2020 at Dragon Gate Champion Gate In Osaka. His biggest accomplishment to date is the Open the Brave Gate Championship, title which he has firstly won at Open the New Year Gate 2022 on January 12 by defeating SB Kento.

Dia is known for competing in various of the promotion's signature events, such as the King of Gate tournament, making his first appearance at the 2020 edition where he defeated Takashi Yoshida in the first rounds but fell short to Kazma Sakamoto in the second round. At the 2022 edition, he fought into a double disqualification against H.Y.O which attracted an elimination for both of them from the first rounds.

Dia competed in the Gate of Destiny series of pay-per-views, which is considered to be the promotion's top yearly event. He made his first appearance at the 2019 edition where he won a 10-man battle royal also involving Ho Ho Lun, Jimmy, Kagetora, Kanjyuro Matsuyama, Mondai Ryu, Oji Shiiba, Punch Tominaga, Stalker Ichikawa and Shachihoko Boy. During his tenure, Dia joined various stables. The first one was "Team Dragon Gate". At the 2020 edition of the Gate of Destiny, he teamed up with stablemates Ben-K and Strong Machine J to defeat R.E.D. (BxB Hulk, Dia Inferno and H.Y.O) in six-man tag team action. The second unit he joined was "Masquerade" and at the 2021 edition of Destiny, he teamed up with stablemates Kota Minoura and La Estrella to defeat R.E.D. (Kai, Diamante, SB Kento and Dia Inferno). His current unit is D'courage. At the 2022 edition of the Destiny, he teamed up with stablemate Madoka Kikuta to retain the Open the Twin Gate Championship over Natural Vibes (Big Boss Shimizu and Strong Machine J).

On March 31, 2026, Dia announced that mutually agreed to part ways with Dragon Gate, ending his near 8-year tenure with the promotion.

=== Pro Wrestling Noah (2022) ===
Dia took part in a cross-over event promoted by Pro Wrestling Noah alongside Dragon Gate on November 11, 2022, the NOAH Global Dream where he teamed up with Alejandro, Dragon Kid, Xtreme Tiger and Ninja Mack to defeat Kongo (Hajime Ohara and Hi69) & Z-Brats (BxB Hulk, Diamante & H.Y.O).

=== New Japan Pro-Wrestling (2024–2025) ===
In 2024 and 2025, Dia represented Dragon Gate in the Best of the Super Juniors and the Super Junior Tag League tournaments held by New Japan Pro-Wrestling (NJPW).

== Championships and accomplishments ==
- Dragon Gate
  - Open the Brave Gate Championship (2 times)
  - Open the Twin Gate Championship (4 times) – with Yuki Yoshioka (3), and Madoka Kikuta (1)
  - Open the Triangle Gate Championship (2 times) – with Jason Lee and La Estrella (1), and Ben-K and Strong Machine J (1)
  - King of Gate (2024)
- Pro Wrestling Illustrated
  - Ranked No. 209 of the top 500 singles wrestlers in the PWI 500 in 2022
