= Madoka Kikuta =

Japanese professional wrestler

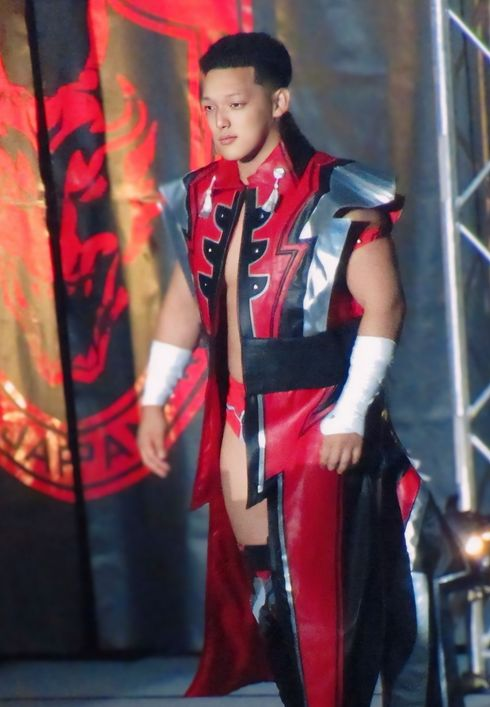
- Kikuta in July 2024

Personal information
- Born: September 20, 1999 (age 27) Kanazawa, Japan
- Family: La Estrella (cousin)

Professional wrestling career
- Ring name(s): Hip Hop Kikuta; Madoka Kikuta
- Billed height: 180 cm (5 ft 11 in)
- Billed weight: 95 kg (209 lb)
- Trained by: Don Fujii; Kagetora
- Debut: 2020

Madoka Kikuta (菊田 円, Kikuta Madoka) is a Japanese professional wrestler. He is currently working for Dragongate, where he is the former two-time Open the Dream Gate Champion. He is currently the leader of villainous stable Gajadokuro, and is a former Open the Twin Gate Champion.

== Professional wrestling career ==
=== Dragon Gate (since 2020) ===
Kikuta made his professional wrestling debut in Dragon Gate on the ninth night of the 2020 edition of the King of Gate tournament from June 6, where he teamed up with Sora Fujikawa in a losing effort against Taketo Kamei and Kento Kobune as a result of a tag team match. After his period of rookie status, he eventually began chasing various championships promoted by the company, and joined his first stable, R.E.D. in the middle of 2020. On the first night of the DG Champion Gate 2021 In Osaka from March 6, he teamed up with stablemates Dia Inferno and Diamante to unsuccessfully challenge Natural Vibes (Genki Horiguchi, Kzy and Susumu Yokosuka) for the Open the Triangle Gate Championship. Kikuta won his first title, the Open the Twin Gate Championship, by teaming up with his "D'courage" tag team partner Dragon Dia and defeating reigning champions Kung Fu Masters (Jacky Funky Kamei and Jason Lee) at DG Dangerous Gate 2022 on September 19. At Dead or Alive 2023 on May 5, Kikuta defeated Shun Skywalker to win the Open the Dream Gate Championship, the promotion's top title.

Kikuta is known for competing in various of the promotion's signature events, such as the King of Gate tournament, in which he made his first appearance at the 2022 edition where he defeated SB Kento in the first rounds, but fell short to BxB Hulk in the second ones. He also competed in a battle royal for a second chance in the tournament, won by Kota Minoura and also involving various other opponents such as Dragon Kid, Yamato, Keisuke Okuda, Kaito Ishida, Eita, Minorita and others. Kikuta also competed in the promotion's biggest annual event, the Gate of Destiny series in which he made his first appearance ath the 2020 edition where he teamed up with Kento Kobune and Taketo Kamei to defeat Team Toryumon (Masato Yoshino, Último Dragón and Yasushi Kanda). At the 2022 edition, he teamed up with Dragon Dia to defeat Natural Vibes (Big Boss Shimizu and Strong Machine J), retaining the Open the Twin Gate Championship.

=== Independent circuit (since 2022) ===
One of the promotions from the Japanese independent scene for which Kikuta has worked is Pro Wrestling Noah. He took part in a cross-over event promoted by them alongside Dragon Gate on November 11, 2022, the NOAH Global Dream where he teamed up with Mochizuki Jr. and Ryu Fuda in a losing effort against Kai Fujimura, Yasutaka Yano and Yoshiki Inamura as a result of a six-man tag team match.

== Personal life ==
Madoka is the cousin of Yuki Kikuta, who wrestles in Dragongate and the North American independent circuits as La Estrella.

== Championships and accomplishments ==
- Dragon Gate
  - Open the Dream Gate Championship (2 times)
  - Open the Twin Gate Championship (1 time) – with Dragon Dia
  - Rey de Parejas (2023) – with Yuki Yoshioka
- Pro Wrestling Illustrated
  - Ranked No. 78 of the top 500 singles wrestlers in the PWI 500 in 2026
