= Yuki Yoshioka =

Japanese professional wrestler

Personal information
- Born: September 14, 1994 (age 32) Ōgaki, Japan

Professional wrestling career
- Ring name(s): Dia Inferno; Yuki Yoshioka; Yoshioka
- Billed height: 175 cm (5 ft 9 in)
- Billed weight: 82 kg (181 lb)
- Debut: October 29, 2016

Yuki Yoshioka (吉岡有紀, Yoshioka Yūki) (born September 14, 1994) is a Japanese professional wrestler currently signed to Dragongate. He is a former Open the Dream Gate Champion.

== Professional wrestling career ==
=== Mexican independent circuit (2020) ===
In addition to his work with Dragon Gate, Yoshioka briefly competed on the Mexican independent circuit. On September 13, 2020, at a house show promoted by the IWRG, he teamed with Shun Skywalker in an unsuccessful challenge against Dragon Bane and El Hijo de Canis Lupus in the finals of a number one contendership tournament for the IWRG Intercontinental Tag Team Championship.

=== Dragon Gate (2016–present) ===
Yoshioka made his professional wrestling debut on October 29, 2016, during the fifteenth day of the Gate of Victory tour, where he teamed with Genki Horiguchi and Ryo Saito in a losing effort against Ben-K, Masaaki Mochizuki and Peter Kaasa.

He later joined the R.E.D. stable, debuting with the group on October 7, 2020, during the Gate of Victory tour. On January 12, 2022, Yoshioka, along with Eita and Kaito Ishida, was expelled from the stable after the other members appointed Shun Skywalker as their new leader. The following day, at Open the New Year Gate 2022, he joined the D'courage stable, teaming with Dragon Dia to defeat SB Kento and H.Y.O for the Open the Twin Gate Championship. At the Ultimo Dragon 35th Anniversary event on July 30, 2022, Yoshioka defeated Kai to capture the Open the Dream Gate Championship.

Yoshioka has competed in several of Dragon Gate's signature events, including the Gate of Destiny. He made his first appearance at the 2018 edition on November 3, teaming with Masaaki Mochizuki and Shun Skywalker in a three-way elimination match for the Open the Triangle Gate Championship, which was ultimately won by Natural Vibes (Genki Horiguchi, Kzy and Susumu Yokosuka). At the 2020 edition on November 4, he teamed with BxB Hulk and H.Y.O in a losing effort against Team Dragon Gate (Ben-K, Dragon Dia and Strong Machine J).

He also participated in the King of Gate tournament, debuting in the 2019 edition where he competed in Block B and scored two points against Eita, Susumu Yokosuka, Masato Yoshino, Yasushi Kanda and Yosuke♥Santa Maria. Yoshioka won the 2022 edition of the tournament by defeating Kota Minoura in the final.

== Championships and accomplishments ==
- Dragongate
  - Open the Dream Gate Championship (1 time)
  - Open the Twin Gate Championship (2 times) – with Dragon Dia
  - Open the Triangle Gate Championship (1 time, current) – with El Cielo and Kota Minoura
  - King of Gate (2022)
  - Rey de Parejas (2023) – with Madoka Kikuta
- Pro Wrestling Illustrated
  - Ranked No. 139 of the top 500 singles wrestlers in the PWI 500 in 2023
