= Big Boss Shimizu =

Japanese professional wrestler

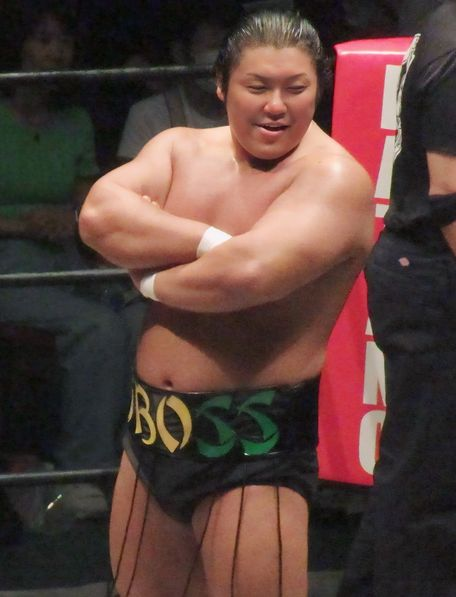
- Shimizu in July 2024

Personal information
- Born: Yuki Shimizu; October 26, 1992 (age 33) Osaka, Japan

Professional wrestling career
- Ring names: Big Boss Shimizu; Big R Shimizu; Boku R Shimizu; Bokutimo Dragon; King Shimizu; Ryotsu Shimizu
- Billed height: 175 cm (5 ft 9 in)
- Billed weight: 111 kg (245 lb)
- Trained by: Don Fujii; Masaaki Mochizuki
- Debut: 2013

Yuki Shimizu (清水優己, Shimizu Yūki; born October 26, 1992) is a Japanese professional wrestler better known by the ring name Big R Shimizu (ビッグR清水, Biggu Āru Shimizu), currently working for the Japanese promotion Dragon Gate as Big Boss Shimizu (BIGBOSS清水, Biggu Bosu Shimizu).

== Professional wrestling career ==
=== Dragon Gate (2013–present) ===
Shimizu made his professional wrestling debut in Dragon Gate, on the seventh night of the 2013 edition of King of Gate from May 25 where he fell short to Uhaa Nation. He was a part of the MaxiMuM stable, winning the Open the Triangle Gate Championship alongside his stablemates Ben-K and Naruki Doi at Memorial Gate 2017 on March 20 by defeating VerserK (Shingo Takagi, T-Hawk and "brother" Yasshi). On August 8, 2018, on the fifth night of the Dragon Gate Results: The Gate Of Adventure, Shimizu teamed up with Naruki Doi to challenge Tribe Vanguard (B×B Hulk and Yamato) for the Open the Twin Gate Championship. He turned on Doi during the match and was declared to join the Antias stable. Antias fused with the R.E.D. stable and Shimizu subsequently became part of it. At The Final Gate 2018 on December 23, he teamed up with Ben-K as "Big Ben", a sub group of the stable to defeat MaxiMuM (Naruki Doi and Masato Yoshino), Mexablood (Bandido and Flamita) and Tribe Vanguard (Yamato and Kagetora) in a four-way elimination match to win the vacant Open the Twin Gate Championship. Shimizu also wrestled in various battle royals such as the one from the eleventh night of The Gate Of Passion on April 22, 2021 where he faced Ryo Saito, Dia Inferno, Diamante, Gamma, Ho Ho Lun and Konomama Ichikawa, Masaaki Mochizuki, Mondai Ryu, Shachihoko Boy, Super Shisa, Takashi Yoshida, Último Dragón and Yosuke♡Santa Maria.

Shimizu is known for competing in several signature events of the promotion. His story in the King of Gate tournament continued in the 2014 edition, where he fell short to Shingo Takagi in a first round match from May 17. One year later, at the 2015 edition of the event, Shimizu pulled a victory against Genki Horiguchi in the first round from May 10, but fell short to Masato Yoshino in the second round. He marked his best result at the 2016 edition, where he won the Block D scoring a total of eight points after competing against Masato Yoshino, Gamma, Naruki Doi, Genki Horiguchi and El Lindaman. He defeated Masaaki Mochizuki in the semi-finals and fell short to Yamato in the finals from June 12.

He also took part in the Summer Adventure Tag League, beginning with the 2014 tournament where he teamed up with Kotoka who was replaced in the last match by Yuga Hayashi, and competed against the teams of B×B Hulk and Masaaki Mochizuki, Akira Tozawa and Shingo Takagi, Genki Horiguchi and Naoki Tanizaki, and Yamato and Tominaga.

Shimizu made his first appearance at the Gate of Destiny branch of pay-per-views at the 2013 edition of the event where he teamed up with Super Shisa and Shachihoko Boy, falling short to Jimmyz (Jimmy Kanda, Jimmy Susumu and Ryo Jimmy Saito) in a six-man tag team match. His last match took place at the 2020 edition where he teamed up with Punch Tominaga and Naruki Doi in a losing effort to Kazma Sakamoto, Kento Kobune and Takashi Yoshida for the vacant Open the Triangle Gate Championship.

== Championships and accomplishments ==
- Dragon Gate
  - Open the Triangle Gate Championship (4 times) – with Ben-K and Naruki Doi (1), Dragon Kid and Masaaki Mochizuki (1), Jacky Kamei and Kzy (1) and Strong Machine J and U-T (1)
  - Open the Twin Gate Championship (6 times) – with Ben-K (2), Eita (1), Susumu Yokosuka (1) T-Hawk, (1) and Kzy (1)
- Pro Wrestling Illustrated
  - Ranked No. 245 of the top 100 male singles wrestlers in the PWI 100 in 2016

== Luchas de Apuestas record ==
Winner (wager)	Loser (wager)	Location	Event	Date	Notes
Diamante (mask)	Bokutimo Dragon (mask)	Tokyo, Japan	The Gate of Passion 2021	April 9, 2021	
