= Punch Tominaga =

Japanese professional wrestler

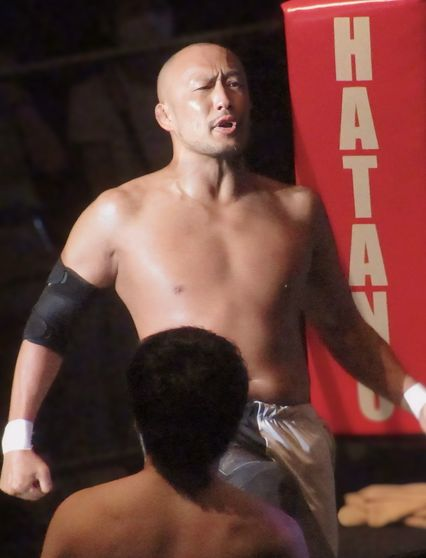
- Tominaga in July 2024

Personal information
- Born: July 29, 1986 (age 39) Tokyo, Japan

Professional wrestling career
- Ring name(s): Dr. VerserK; Sumo Hagetora; Chihiro Tominaga; Punch Tominaga
- Billed height: 1.72 m (5 ft 8 in)
- Billed weight: 75 kg (165 lb)
- Trained by: Masaaki Mochizuki; Shingo Takagi
- Debut: 2011

Chihiro Tominaga (富永千尋, Tominaga Chihiro), better known by his ring name Punch Tominaga (パンチ富永, Panchi Tominaga), is a Japanese professional wrestler, currently working for the Japanese professional wrestling promotion Dragon Gate where he is a former Open the Brave Gate Champion.

== Professional wrestling career ==
=== Independent circuit (2011-present) ===
Tominaga worked a match for Diamond Ring, on March 11, 2012 at a promotion's house show where he teamed up tih Eita Kobayashi and Kenichiro Arai in a losing effort to Diamond Ring (Katsuhiko Nakajima, Mitsuhiro Kitamiya and Satoshi Kajiwara). He also competed for Osaka Pro Wrestling, at Osaka Pro Natsu Ya Sumi! on July 26, 2015, where he teamed up with Gamma, Magnitude Kishiwada and Tadasuke, scoring a defeat against Tsubasa, HUB, Kuishinbo Kamen and Ultimate Spider Jr. in an eight-man tag team match. Later that night, he competed in a singles match against HUB, again unsuccessfully.

=== Dragon Gate (2011-present) ===
Tominaga made his professional wrestling debut for Dragon Gate at Dragon Gate NEX Sanctuary.58 on February 5, 2010, where he scored a victory against Takuya Onodera. At Final Gate 2015 on December 20, he teamed up with Gamma as Over Generation to unsuccessfully challenge VerserK (Naruki Doi and Yamato) for the Open the Twin Gate Championship. A notable opponent of his was Uhaa Nation, whom he fought at Dragon Gate PRIME ZONE Vol. 27 on February 10, 2015 unsuccessfully in a singles match. Tominaga won his only title of his career, the Open the Brave Gate Championship at Champion Gate in Osaka 2018 from March 3, where he defeated Yasushi Kanda to become champion. Tominaga was part of VerserK, a stable which activated between 2015 and 2017. Teaming up with his stablemates El Lindaman, Shingo Takagi, T-Hawk and Takashi Yoshida at Dangerous Gate 2017, they lost to Jimmyz (Genki Horiguchi, K-ness, Jimmy Kanda, Jimmy Susumu and Jimmy Ryo Saito) in a losing unit must disband match after they got betrayed by K-ness. On December 15 at Final Gate 2019, he participated in a 10-man battle royal, coming out short to other wrestlers such as the winner Kota Minoura, K-ness, Yosuke Santa Maria and Yasushi Tsujimoto. He competed in another 10-man battle royal at Gate of Destiny on November 4, 2019, where he came unsuccessfully again after facing the winner Dragon Dia, Kagetora, Ho Ho Lun and Stalker Ichikawa. At The Gate Of Destiny 2020 on March 11, Tominaga teamed up with Naruki Doi and Ryotsu Shimizu to unsuccessfully challenge Kazma Sakamoto, Kento Kobune and Takashi Yoshida for the vacant Open the Triangle Gate Championship.

Tominaga made notable appearances in the promotion's tournament King of Gate. His last appearance was at King of Gate 2019, where he placed himself in block A, and competed against Ryo Saito, Kazma Sakamoto, Naruki Doi, Kzy and U-T, finishing with no points. He also competed one year earlier in the King of Gate 2018 tournament, where he came second with a total of 5 points placing himself in the Block C alongside Naruki Doi, Yosuke Santa Maria, Eita and Dragon Kid. Two years earlier, on the 2016 edition of the event, he placed himself in the Block A where he scored a total of two points after competing against his trainer Shingo Takagi, Don Fujii, Jimmy Kanda, Kzy and Yamato. At the 2014 edition of the Summer Adventure Tag League, he teamed up with former Mad Blankey stablemate Yamato, placing themselves in the Block B where they competed against BxB Hulk and Masaaki Mochizuki, Shingo Takagi and Akira Tozawa, Genki Horiguchi and Naoki Tanizaki, and Kotoka and Ryotsu Shimizu.

== Championships and accomplishments ==
- Dragon Gate
  - Open the Brave Gate Championship (1 time)
  - Open the Triangle Gate Championship (1 time) – with Dragon Kid and Yamato
- Ryukyu Dragon Pro Wrestling
  - Sou Ryui Tag Team Championship (1 time, current) – with Shuri Joe

== Luchas de Apuestas record ==
Winner (wager)	Loser (wager)	Location	Event	Date	Notes
Chihiro Tominaga (hair)	Mondai Ryu (entrance theme)	Kobe, Japan	Dragon Gate The Gate Of Passion 2012	April 19, 2012	
Akira Tozawa (hair)	Yosuke Santa Maria (hair)	Tokyo, Japan	Dragon Gate The Gate Of Generation 2013	August 1, 2013	^{[1]}

=== Notes ===
[1] - This was an eight-man tag team Mask vs. Hair match, where Tozawa, BxB Hulk, Kzy, Mondai Ryu and Yamato faced Shenlong, Chihiro Tominaga, Cyber Kong and Shingo Takagi.
