= Yosuke Santa Maria =

Japanese professional wrestler

Yosuke ♡ Santa Maria
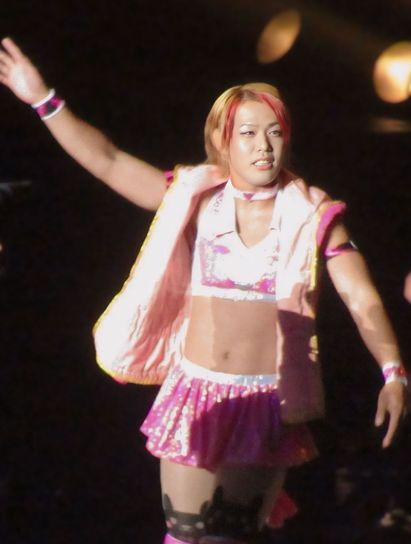
- Yosuke ♡ Santa Maria in July 2024

Personal information
- Born: Yosuke Watanabe; 14 December 1991 (age 34) Itabashi, Japan

Professional wrestling career
- Ring name(s): Former Super Shenlong III: Yosuke Watanabe; Super Shenlong III; Yosuke ♡ Santa Maria; Yosuke Watanabe
- Billed height: 1.73 m (5 ft 8 in)
- Billed weight: 73 kg (161 lb)
- Trained by: Nex Wrestling School
- Debut: May 30, 2011

Yosuke Watanabe (渡辺陽介, Watanabe Yōsuke; born December 14, 1991), better known under the ring name Yosuke ♡ Santa Maria (ヨースケ♡サンタマリア, Yōsuke Santa Maria), is a Japanese professional wrestler. As of 2025, she is currently working for both the men's promotion Dragongate and the women's (joshi) promotion Marvelous as an intergender wrestler. An exótico, she is a former Open the Brave Gate Champion and the current Open the Owarai Gate Champion in her second reign.

== Professional wrestling career ==
=== Dragon Gate ===
==== Early years (2011–2013) ====
Watanabe trained for her professional wrestling career in the Japanese promotion Dragon Gate's wrestling school called "Dragon Gate Nex" and made her debut on January 26, 2011 at Dragon Gate Nex's Sanctuary.71 show in Kobe, Hyogo, Japan, wrestling to a draw against fellow trainee, and future stable mate, Eita Kobayashi. She later "graduated" to the main Dragon Gate shows as a low ranking rookie. On April 19, 2012, Watanabe would become the third incarnation of Super Shenlong (三代目超神龍, Sandaime Sūpā Shenron), she would also form -akatsuki- along Chihiro Tominaga, Shingo Takagi and Yamato. On May 6, -akatsuki- defeated Mad Blankey in an eight-person tag team match. Super Shenlong teamed up with Takagi and Yamato to participate in 2012's Summer Adventure Tag League with their only win going against Mad Blankey's Cyber Kong, Kzy and Mondai Ryu. On August 1, 2013, -akatsuki- was forced to disband, after losing to Mad Blankey in a five-on-four tag team match. Also part of the stipulation, Super Shenlong was forced to unmask revealing her true identity, thus adopting the ring name of Former Super Shenlong III, Yosuke Watanabe (元三代目超神龍・渡辺陽介, Moto Sandaime Sūpā Shenron Watanabe Yōsuke). During the Summer Adventure Tag League, Naruki Doi turned on Masato Yoshino, meaning that Watanabe would fill Doi's spot in the tournament. The team defeated Don Fujii and Masaaki Mochizuki.

==== Millennials (2014–2015) ====
No longer wanting to hide her true feelings, Watanabe joined the Millennials and renamed herself Yosuke ♡ Santa Maria (after the Japanese actor Yūsuke Santamaria), stating that she now used feminine pronouns. In keeping with the Millennials lucha libre style, Santa Maria is an exótico, a person who fights in drag, incorporating dancing, feminine costumes and outrageous moves such as Sky Love and Zona Rosa. On February 22, 2014, Santa Maria debuted for Dragon Gate USA losing to Caleb Konley, the following night she defeated Ethan Page. On March 1, Santa Maria had her first championship match against Genki Horiguchi H.A.Gee.Mee!! for the Open the Brave Gate Championship, which she lost. On November 2, Santa Maria teamed with the unaffiliated "Mr. High Tension" Kotoka and Yuga Hayashi to defeat Don Fujii, Stalker Ichikawa and Super Shisa, teasing their eventual joining. Four days later, the Millennials defeated Team Veteran Returns forcing them to disband, had the Millennials lost they would have been deported. On November 30, Santa Maria was pinned during a hair vs hair match. Santa Maria was forced into the chair for her haircut and despite her rampant protests, Fujii said that the rules were the rules, and as such the show has to end with Maria having her head shaved. However, he had a change of heart after seeing how dejected Santa Maria was, and after offering to cut someone else's hair, decided to cut his own hair in an act he considered tanpatsushiki. Following Flamita vacating the Open the Brave Gate Championship and abandoning the Millennials, Santa Maria entered a tournament to crown a new winner but on January 1, 2015, she lost to Dr. Muscle in the first round. On February 4, Santa Maria defeated Jimmy Kanda and via fan support won the Open the Owarai Gate Championship, his first professional wrestling title. She lost the title to Akira Tozawa on March 29, 2015. On August 6, 2015, Millennials lost a three-way match and were as a result forced to disband. Despite this, Watanabe retained the Yosuke ♡ Santa Maria gimmick.

==== Tribe Vanguard (2016–2019) ====
On March 5, 2016, Santa Maria defeated Kotoka to win the Open the Brave Gate Championship. On May 28, Santa Maria, along with BxB Hulk, Yamato, and Kzy, formed a new unit named Tribe Vanguard. On July 24, Santa Maria lost the Open the Brave Gate Championship to her former Millennials stablemate, Eita. In the latter half of 2016, Santa Maria began teaming with El Lindaman, with the duo beginning a kayfabe romance after Lindaman confessed that he liked Santa Maria and wanted "to fight with and protect her", the duo was officially named the Marilyns. After a poor showing in the 2016 Summer Adventure Tag League where the Marilyns tied for last place in their block with just two points, Tribe Vanguard leader Yamato declared that Lindaman would not be allowed to join their unit and Santa Maria slapped Lindaman, officially breaking up the Marilyns. In March 2017, Santa Maria participated in a tournament to crown a new Open The Brave Gate Championship, she lost to Lindaman in the semi-finals.

== Character and reception ==
Watanabe's gimmick is that of an exótico, or a wrestler performing in feminine drag. In accordance with the gimmick, Watanabe has long, feminine like hair, and wears makeup and a skirt during matches. Watanabe is also exclusively referred to using feminine pronouns and considered a woman by the Dragon Gate roster. Since becoming Santa Maria in 2014, Watanabe's popularity has skyrocketed with fans, becoming one of the most popular acts in the company.

== Championships and accomplishments ==
- Dragongate
  - Open the Owarai Gate Championship (2 times)
  - Open the Brave Gate Championship (1 time)
- Pro Wrestling Illustrated
  - PWI ranked her No. 344 of the top 500 singles wrestlers in the PWI 500 in 2016

== See also ==
- List of exóticos
