= King of Gate =

Japanese wrestling tournament

King of Gate is an annual single-elimination professional wrestling singles tournament held in the Japanese promotion Dragon Gate. It is the successor to El Numero Uno, previously held in Dragon Gate and Toryumon, although Uno was a round-robin tournament, as opposed to the single-elimination format used by King of Gate. In 2016, King of Gate adopted a round robin format with four separate blocks.

== Results ==
=== List of winners ===
Year	Winner	Total Won
2005	Ryo Saito	1
2006	Masaaki Mochizuki	1
2007	Gamma	1
2008	Naruki Doi	1
2010	Shingo Takagi	1
2011	BxB Hulk	1
2012	Genki Horiguchi H.A.Gee.Mee!!	1
2013	Ricochet	1
2014	Jimmy Susumu	1
2015	Masato Yoshino	1
2016	Yamato	1
2017	T-Hawk	1
2018	Masato Yoshino	2
2019	Ben-K	1
2020	Eita	1
2021	Kzy	1
2022	Yuki Yoshioka	1
2023	Kota Minoura	1
2024	Dragon Dia	1
2025	Gianni Valletta	1

=== 2005 ===
The 2005 King of Gate was a 26-man tournament held from December 23 to December 27 over 5 daily shows. Due to the uneven number of participants, six were given byes to the second round.

1st Round
Dragon Kid	Pin
Daniel Mishima	8:49
Naruki Doi	Pin
Johnson Florida	6:48
K-ness	Pin
Susumu Yokosuka	25:20
Don Fujii	Bye
-	-
Magnitude Kishiwada	Pin
Anthony W. Mori	8:11
Kenichiro Arai	Bye
-	-
CIMA	Sub
Naoki Tanizaki	13:02
Michael Iwasa	Bye
-	-
Shingo Takagi	Pin
Masato Yoshino	16:21
Super Shisa	Bye
-	-
Stalker Ichikawa	NC
Shachihoko Machine	2:34
BxB Hulk	Bye
-	-
Masaaki Mochizuki	Pin
Magnum TOKYO	16:56
Katsuo	Bye
-	-
Genki Horiguchi	Pin
Tozawa	4:31
Jackson Florida	Sub
Ryo Saito	7:34

2nd Round
Dragon Kid	Pin
Naruki Doi	9:56
Susumu Yokosuka	Pin
Don Fujii	20:11
Anthony W. Mori	Forf
Kenichiro Arai
CIMA	Sub
Michael Iwasa	8:02
Shingo Takagi	Pin
Super Shisa	6:14
-	-
BxB Hulk	Bye
Masaaki Mochizuki	Pin
Katsuo	3:53
Genki Horiguchi	Pin
Ryo Saito	1:10

Quarterfinals
Dragon Kid	Pin
Susumu Yokosuka	22:00
Kenichiro Arai	Sub
CIMA	10:56
Shingo Takagi	Pin
BxB Hulk	12:30
Masaaki Mochizuki	Pin
Ryo Saito	19:30

Semifinals
Sususmu Yokosuka	Pin
CIMA	14:45
Shingo Takagi	Pin
Ryo Saito	9:36

Finals
Susumu Yokosuka	Pin
Ryo Saito	30:00

=== 2006 ===
The 2006 King of Gate was a 15-man tournament held from December 10 to December 22 over four shows. The 2005 winner, Ryo Saito, received a bye to the second round.

First round
BxB Hulk	Pin
Yasushi Kanda	6:10
CIMA	Pin
Gamma	11:14
Genki Horiguchi	Pin
Masato Yoshino	8:07
Ryo Saito	Bye
-	-
Naruki Doi	Pin
Kouji Shishido	6:39
Masaaki Mochizuki	Pin
Susumu Yokosuka	18:49
Anthony W. Mori	Pin
Dick Togo	7:49
Don Fujii	Pin
Magnitude Kishiwada	13:33

Second round
BxB Hulk	Pin
Gamma	10:45
Masato Yoshino	Pin
Ryo Saito	12:07
Naruki Doi	Pin
Masaaki Mochizuki	13:02
Dick Togo	Pin
Don Fujii	17:10

Semifinals
Gamma	Pin
Ryo Saito	11:15
Masaaki Mochizuki	Pin
Dick Togo	15:00

Finals
Ryo Saito	Pin
Masaaki Mochizuki	17:21

=== 2007 ===
The 2007 King of Gate was a 16-man tournament, held from December 1 to December 9 over seven shows.

First round
Masato Yoshino	Pin
Susumu Yokosuka	19:55
Shingo Takagi	Pin
Dragon Kid	17:35
Gamma	Pin
Anthony W. Mori	5:39
BxB Hulk	Pin
Ryo Saito	14:28
CIMA	Pin
Don Fujii	20:19
Naruki Doi	Sub
Austin Aries	19:17
Masaaki Mochizuki	Pin
Yasushi Kanda	8:46
Kenichiro Arai	Pin
Cyber Kong	10:35

Second round
Susumu Yokosuka	Pin
Dragon Kid	18:24
Gamma	Pin
BxB Hulk	11:06
CIMA	Pin
Austin Aries	14:56
Masaaki Mochizuki	Sub
Cyber Kong	12:27

Semifinals
Dragon Kid	Pin
Gamma	3:46
CIMA	Sub
Masaaki Mochizuki	16:01

Finals
Gamma	Stop
CIMA	10:58

=== 2008 ===
The 2008 King of Gate tournament, a sixteen-man tournament, was held from December 2 to December 19, covering six shows. Before the tournament started, current Open the Dream Gate Champion Shingo Takagi pulled out, and was replaced by Madoka, who won a Battle Royal on November 29 for the 16th and final spot.

First round
Cyber Kong	6:35
Madoka	Pin
Susumu Yokosuka	13:02
Magnitude Kishiwada	Pin
Taku Iwasa	Pin
Anthony W. Mori	13:47
Masaaki Mochizuki	Sub
Gamma	7:52
Dragon Kid	20:57
Naruki Doi	Pin
Ryo Saito	11:05
BxB Hulk	Stop
YAMATO	9:56
Don Fujii	Sub
Naoki Tanizaki	Sub
Genki Horiguchi	11:11

Second round
Madoka	10:38
Magnitude Kishiwada	Pin
Taku Iwasa	14:24
Masaaki Mochizuki	Pin
Naruki Doi	Pin
BxB Hulk	20:29
Don Fujii	Ringout
Naoki Tanisaki	3:45

Semifinals
Magnitude Kishiwada	9:39
Masaaki Mochizuki	Pin
Naruki Doi	Sub
Don Fujii	9:59

Finals
Masaaki Mochizuki	16:30
Naruki Doi	Pin

=== 2010 ===
After being postponed in 2009, the King of Gate returned in April 2010. Sixteen wrestlers occupied two blocks of eight each. The first round of Block A was on April 3, and the first round of Block B on April 4. Quarterfinal action was on April 9 and 10. The semifinals and finals of the tournament occurred on April 14.

First round
KAGETORA	10:29
Dragon Kid	Pin
Naruki Doi	13:26
Gamma	Pin
CIMA	18:25
Masato Yoshino	Sub
YAMATO	20:19
Masaaki Mochizuki	Pin
Don Fujii	9:23
Genki Horiguchi	Pin
Shingo Takagi	Pin
Takuya Sugawara	10:05
BxB Hulk	Pin
Cyber Kong	5:46
K-ness	Pin
Susumu Yokosuka	21:49

Second round
Dragon Kid	Pin
Gamma	12:42
Masato Yoshino	Pin
Masaaki Mochizuki	18:29
Genki Horiguchi	8:31
Shingo Takagi	Pin
BxB Hulk	Pin
K-ness	12:32

Semifinals
Dragon Kid	Pin
Masato Yoshino	10:25
Shingo Takagi	Pin
BxB Hulk	16:06

Finals
Dragon Kid	Pin
Shingo Takagi	15:52

=== 2011 ===
The 2011 King of Gate tournament, a sixteen-man tournament, was held from May 12 to May 21, covering six shows.

First round
Masato Yoshino	11:54
Yasushi Kanda	Pin
PAC	11:54
Dragon Kid	Pin
Gamma	12:17
Cyber Kong	Pin
Shingo Takagi	18:16
Masaaki Mochizuki	KO
Don Fujii	7:36
YAMATO	Pin
CIMA	Pin
Susumu Yokosuka	14:53
Ryo Saito	Pin
Genki Horiguchi	16:33
Naruki Doi	18:31
BxB Hulk	Pin

Second round
Yasushi Kanda	Pin
Dragon Kid	10:41
Cyber Kong	15:22
Masaaki Mochizuki	Pin
YAMATO	18:53
CIMA	Pin
Ryo Saito	11:27
BxB Hulk	Pin

Semifinals
Yasushi Kanda	Pin
Masaaki Mochizuki	10:37
CIMA	7:10
BxB Hulk	Pin

Finals
Yasushi Kanda	14:04
BxB Hulk	Pin

=== 2012 ===
The 2012 King of Gate tournament, a sixteen-man tournament, took place from May 10 to May 19, covering six shows.

First round
Dragon Kid	13:26
Jimmy Susumu	Pin
YAMATO	13:01
Shingo Takagi	Sub
Akira Tozawa	15:30
Naruki Doi	Pin
Masato Yoshino	18:40
BxB Hulk	Sub
Eita Kobayashi	8:13
Kzy	Pin
Masaaki Mochizuki	11:18
Jimmy Kanda	Pin
Don Fujii	3:43
Mondai Ryu	Pin
Genki Horiguchi H.A.Gee.Mee!!	9:43
Cyber Kong	Pin

Second round
Dragon Kid	14:47
YAMATO	Pin
Akira Tozawa	14:45
Masato Yoshino	Pin
Eita Kobayashi	11:11
Masaaki Mochizuki	Pin
Don Fujii	10:49
Genki Horiguchi H.A.Gee.Mee!!	Pin

Semifinals
Dragon Kid	13:23
Akira Tozawa	Pin
Masaaki Mochizuki	11:02
Genki Horiguchi H.A.Gee.Mee!!	Pin

Finals
Akira Tozawa	18:08
Genki Horiguchi H.A.Gee.Mee!!	Pin

=== 2013 ===
The 2013 King of Gate tournament, a sixteen-man tournament, took take place from May 10 to May 25, covering seven shows.

First round
Don Fujii	Pin
Kotoka	6:23
Masaaki Mochizuki	15:48
YAMATO	Pin
BxB Hulk	24:23
Shingo Takagi	Pin
Genki Horiguchi H.A.Gee.Mee!!	Pin
Rich Swann	7:29
Dragon Kid	Pin
Naruki Doi	15:11
Jimmy Susumu	Pin
Uhaa Nation	8:45
Akira Tozawa	12:39
Masato Yoshino	Pin
Ricochet	Pin
Ryo "Jimmy" Saito	10:48

Second round
Don Fujii	14:40
YAMATO	Pin
Shingo Takagi	Pin
Genki Horiguchi H.A.Gee.Mee!!	11:25
Dragon Kid	21:24
Jimmy Susumu	Pin
Masato Yoshino	15:18
Ricochet	Pin

Semifinals
YAMATO	14:44
Shingo Takagi	Pin
Jimmy Susumu	10:55
Ricochet	Pin

Finals
Shingo Takagi	18:42
Ricochet	Pin

=== 2014 ===
The 2014 King of Gate tournament, a sixteen-man tournament, took take place from May 9 to May 31, covering nine shows.

First round
BxB Hulk	Pin
Naruki Doi	9:04
Genki Horiguchi H.A.Gee.Mee!!	Pin
YAMATO	14:13
T-Hawk	Pin
Akira Tozawa	17:35
Eita	12:38
Masato Yoshino	Sub
Jimmy Susumu	Pin
Cyber Kong	3:56
Masaaki Mochizuki	Pin
Jimmy Kagetora	14:25
Mr. Kyu Kyu Naoki Tanizaki Toyonaka Dolphin	Pin
Jimmy Kanda	6:31
Shingo Takagi	Pin
Ryotsu Shimizu	9:46

Second round
BxB Hulk	Pin
Genki Horiguchi H.A.Gee.Mee!!	7:58
T-Hawk	Pin
Masato Yoshino	13:48
Jimmy Susumu	Pin
Masaaki Mochizuki	18:37
Mr. Kyu Kyu Naoki Tanizaki Toyonaka Dolphin	13:41
Shingo Takagi	Pin

Semifinals
BxB Hulk	15:46
T-Hawk	Pin
Jimmy Susumu	Pin
Shingo Takagi	16:20

Finals
T-Hawk	20:14
Jimmy Susumu	Pin

=== 2015 ===
The 2015 King of Gate tournament, a sixteen-man tournament, took take place from May 8 to May 30, covering seven shows.

First round
T-Hawk	Pin
Yamato	24:38
Naruki Doi	Pin
CIMA	10:03
BxB Hulk	Pin
Ryo "Jimmy" Saito	15:03
Akira Tozawa	Pin
Shingo Takagi	18:38
Masato Yoshino	Pin
Dragon Kid	13:43
Big R Shimizu	14:36
Genki Horiguchi H.A.Gee.Mee!!	Pin
Jimmy Susumu	9:38
Masaaki Mochizuki	Pin
Cyber Kong	9:04
Shachihoko Boy	Pin

Second round
T-Hawk	Pin
Naruki Doi	12:29
BxB Hulk	Pin
Akira Tozawa	17:32
Masato Yoshino	Pin
Big R Shimizu	8:58
Masaaki Mochizuki	Pin
Syachihoko BOY	9:22

Semifinals
T-Hawk	Pin
BxB Hulk	21:26
Masato Yoshino	Pin
Masaaki Mochizuki	12:20

Finals
T-Hawk	25:15
Masato Yoshino	Pin

=== 2016 ===
The 2016 King of Gate tournament, a round robin tournament, featuring 4 blocks. It took place from May 8 to June 12, covering twenty shows.

Final standings
Block A		Block B		Block C		Block D	
YAMATO	6	Akira Tozawa	7	Masaaki Mochizuki	7	Big R Shimizu	8
Kzy	5	Eita	7	T-Hawk	6	Masato Yoshino	7
Shingo Takagi	5	CIMA	6	Dragon Kid	6	Gamma	6
Jimmy Kanda	5	Jimmy Susumu	6	Ryo "Jimmy" Saito	5	Naruki Doi	4
Don Fujii	5	Yosuke♥Santa Maria	4	Kotoka	4	Genki Horiguchi H.A.Gee.Mee!! 4	
Punch Tominaga	2	Mondai Ryu	0	Cyber Kong	2	El Lindaman	1

Block A	Shingo Takagi	YAMATO	Don Fujii	Jimmy Kanda	Kzy	Punch Tominaga
Shingo Takagi	X	Takagi (17:11)	Draw (20:00)	Takagi (13:22)	Kzy (15:28)	Double Countout (16:20)
YAMATO	Takagi (17:11)	X	Fujii (12:11)	YAMATO (10:06)	YAMATO (13:28)	YAMATO (6:55)
Don Fujii	Draw (20:00)	Fujii (12:11)	X	Kanda (8:50)	Kzy (10:26)	Fujii (13:24)
Jimmy Kanda	Takagi (13:22)	YAMATO (10:06)	Kanda (8:50)	X	Kanda (9:09)	Draw (20:00)
Kzy	Kzy (15:28)	YAMATO (13:26)	Kzy (10:26)	Kanda (9:09)	X	Draw (20:00)
Punch Tominaga	Double Countout (16:20)	YAMATO (6:55)	Fujii (13:24)	Draw (20:00)	Draw (20:00)	X
Block B	CIMA	Jimmy Susumu	Akira Tozawa	Eita	Yosuke♥Santa Maria	Mondai Ryu
CIMA	X	Susumu (16:39)	CIMA (16:03)	Eita (11:39)	CIMA (13:08)	CIMA (0:14)
Jimmy Susumu	Susumu (16:39)	X	Tozawa (19:03)	Eita (17:38)	Susumu (13:56)	Susumu (8:28)
Akira Tozawa	CIMA (16:03)	Tozawa (19:03)	X	Draw (20:00)	Tozawa (9:52)	Tozawa (6:50)
Eita	Eita (11:39)	Eita (17:38)	Draw (20:00)	X	Maria (10:19)	Eita (2:31)
Yosuke♥Santa Maria	CIMA (13:08)	Susumu (13:56)	Tozawa (9:52)	Maria (10:19)	X	Maria (6:18)
Mondai Ryu	CIMA (0:14)	Susumu (8:28)	Tozawa (6:50)	Eita (2:31)	Maria (6:18)	X
Block C	T-Hawk	Ryo "Jimmy" Saito	Masaaki Mochizuki	Dragon Kid	Cyber Kong	Kotoka
T-Hawk	X	T-Hawk (15:45)	Mochizuki (10:43)	T-Hawk (9:18)	T-Hawk (12:34)	Kotoka (8:05)
Ryo "Jimmy" Saito	T-Hawk (15:45)	X	Draw (20:00)	Saito (15:00)	Kong (6:28)	Saito (3:45)
Masaaki Mochizuki	Mochizuki (10:43)	Draw (20:00)	X	Kid (11:33)	Mochizuki (12:33)	Mochizuki (8:12)
Dragon Kid	T-Hawk (9:18)	Saito (15:00)	Kid (11:33)	X	Kid (9:20)	Kid (10:49)
Cyber Kong	T-Hawk (12:34)	Kong (6:28)	Mochizuki (12:33)	Kid (9:20)	X	Kotoka (5:30)
Kotoka	Kotoka (8:05)	Saito (3:45)	Mochizuki (8:12)	Kid (10:49)	Kotoka (5:30)	X
Block D	Masato Yoshino	Naruki Doi	Gamma	Genki Horiguchi H.A.Gee.Mee!! Big R Shimizu	El Lindaman	
Masato Yoshino	X	Yoshino (16:45)	Yoshino (8:43)	H.A.Gee.Mee (8:20)	Yoshino (10:46)	Draw (20:00)
Naruki Doi	Yoshino (16:45)	X	Gamma (7:54)	Doi (11:21)	Shimizu (15:20)	Doi (9:44)
Gamma	Yoshino (8:43)	Gamma (7:54)	X	Gamma (6:13)	Shimizu (4:34)	Gamma (7:49)
Genki Horiguchi H.A.Gee.Mee	H.A.Gee.Mee (8:20)	Doi (11:21)	Gamma (6:13)	X	Shimizu (8:29)	H.A.Gee.Mee (7:21)
Big R Shimizu	Yoshino (10:46)	Shimizu (15:20)	Shimizu (4:34)	Shimizu (8:29)	X	Shimizu (4:43)
El Lindaman	Draw (20:00)	Doi (9:44)	Gamma (7:49)	H.A.Gee.Mee (7:21)	Shimizu (4:43)	X

Block B Decision
B1	Akira Tozawa	Pin
B2	Eita	14:44

Semifinals
A1	YAMATO	Pin
B1	Akira Tozawa	18:53
C1	Masaaki Mochizuki	Pin
D1	Big R Shimizu	14:25

Finals
A1	YAMATO	Sub
D1	Big R Shimizu	24:15

=== 2017 ===
The 2017 King of Gate tournament, a round robin tournament, featuring 4 blocks. It took place from May 9 to June 11.

Final Standings
Block A		Block B		Block C		Block D	
Eita	7	T-Hawk	8	Naruki Doi	7	Shingo Takagi	8
Don Fujii	6	Jimmy Susumu	7	CIMA	6	BxB Hulk	6
Dragon Kid	6	Kzy	7	Jimmy Kagetora	5	Masaaki Mochizuki	6
YAMATO	6	Gamma	4	Ryo "Jimmy" Saito	5	Jimmy Kanda	4
Big R Shimizu	5	Ben-K	2	Takashi Yoshida(Cyber Kong)	3	Genki Horiguchi H.A.Gee.Mee	4
Jimmy Kness JKS	0	Yosuke♥Santa Maria	2	Takehiro Yamamura	3	El Lindaman	2

Block A	YAMATO	Don Fujii	Big R Shimizu	Jimmy Kness JKS	Dragon Kid	Eita
YAMATO	X	Fujii (8:43)	Shimizu (3:32)	YAMATO (14:10)	YAMATO (14:13)	YAMATO (18:19)
Don Fujii	Fujii (8:43)	X	Fujii (9:20)	Fujii (Forfeit)	Kid (9:57)	Eita (12:13)
Big R Shimizu	Shimizu (3:32)	Fujii (9:20)	X	Shimizu (8:14)	Kid (10:03)	DRAW (20:00)
Jimmy Kness JKS	YAMATO (14:10)	Fujii (Forfeit)	Shimizu (8:14)	X	Kid (6:19)	Eita (6:06)
Dragon Kid	YAMATO (14:13)	Kid (9:57)	Kid (10:03)	Kid (6:19)	X	Eita (14:44)
Eita	YAMATO (18:19)	Eita (12:13)	DRAW (20:00)	Eita (6:06)	Eita (14:44)	X
Block B	T-Hawk	Jimmy Susumu	Kzy	Yosuke♥Santa Maria	Ben-K	Gamma
T-Hawk	X	Susumu (13:27)	T-Hawk (11:49)	T-Hawk (11:15)	T-Hawk (11:49)	T-Hawk (7:50)
Jimmy Susumu	Susumu (13:27)	X	DRAW (20:00)	Yosuke (12:26)	Susumu (6:30)	Susumu (16:19)
Kzy	T-Hawk (11:49)	DRAW (20:00)	X	Kzy (11:33)	Kzy (7:56)	Kzy (7:57)
Yosuke♥Santa Maria	T-Hawk (11:15)	Maria (12:26)	Kzy (11:33)	X	Ben-K (8:28)	Gamma (7:39)
Ben-K	T-Hawk (11:49)	Susumu (6:30)	Kzy (7:56)	Ben-K (8:28)	X	Gamma (8:53)
Gamma	T-Hawk (7:50)	Susumu (16:19)	Kzy (7:57)	Gamma (7:39)	Gamma (8:53)	X
Block C	Naruki Doi	Jimmy Kagetora	CIMA	Takehiro Yamamura	Takashi Yoshida(Cyber Kong)	Ryo "Jimmy" Saito
Naruki Doi	X	Doi (13:06)	CIMA (16:25)	Doi (15:27)	Doi (11:20)	DRAW (20:00)
Jimmy Kagetora	Doi (13:06)	X	CIMA (13:07)	DRAW (20:00)	Kagetora (12:48)	Kagetora (8:10)
CIMA	CIMA (16:25)	CIMA (13:07)	X	Yamamura (6:00)	DRAW (7:45)	CIMA (16:22)
Takehiro Yamamura	Doi (15:27)	DRAW (20:00)	Yamamura (6:00)	X	Yoshida (7:51)	Saito (10:33)
Takashi Yoshida(Cyber Kong)	Doi (11:20)	Kagetora (12:48)	DRAW (7:45)	Yoshida (7:51)	X	Saito (13:15)
Ryo "Jimmy" Saito	DRAW (20:00)	Kagetora (8:10)	CIMA (16:22)	Saito (10:33)	Saito (13:15)	X
Block D	Shingo Takagi	BxB Hulk	El Lindaman	Masaaki Mochizuki	Genki Horiguchi H.A.Gee.Mee	Jimmy Kanda
Shingo Takagi	X	Takagi (19:42)	Takagi (12:35)	Mochizuki (13:52)	Takagi (10:22)	Takagi (13:47)
BxB Hulk	Takagi (19:42)	X	Hulk (12:58)	Hulk (13:28)	Horiguchi (11:25)	Hulk (9:04)
El Lindaman	Takagi (12:35)	Hulk (12:58)	X	Mochizuki (10:49)	Horiguchi (8:47)	Lindaman (8:28)
Masaaki Mochizuki	Mochizuki (13:52)	Hulk (13:28)	Mochizuki (10:49)	X	Mochizuki (8:36)	Kanda (11:21)
Genki Horiguchi H.A.Gee.Mee	Takagi (10:22)	Horiguchi (11:25)	Horiguchi (8:47)	Mochizuki (8:36)	X	Kanda (6:11)
Jimmy Kanda	Takagi (13:47)	Hulk (9:04)	Lindaman (8:28)	Kanda (11:21)	Kanda (6:11)	X

Semifinals
A1	Eita	Pin
B1	T-Hawk	14:13
C1	Naruki Doi	Pin
D1	Shingo Takagi	19:03

Finals
B1	T-Hawk	Pin
C1	Naruki Doi	23:50

=== 2018 ===
The 2018 King of Gate tournament, a round robin tournament, featuring 4 blocks and will take place from May 8 to June 10. The winner of each respective block will advance to a single elimination tournament that will take place on June 1 & June 9. The winner of this tournament receives a Dream Gate title match on June 10. The fighter with the lowest point total in each block will also compete in a single elimination tournament, to be held on June 2 & 3 to decide overall last place. Eita took part in the last place tournament due to Dragon Kid's injuries.

Final Standings
Block A		Block B		Block C		Block D	
YAMATO	6	Takashi Yoshida	6	Naruki Doi	8	Masato Yoshino	5
Ben-K	5	Jason Lee	4	Punch Tominaga	5	Susumu Yokosuka	4
Kzy	5	BxB Hulk	4	Yosuke♥Santa Maria	4	Shingo Takagi	4
Shun Skywalker	2	Genki Horiguchi	4	Eita	3	Kagetora	3
Yasushi Kanda	2	Big R Shimizu	2	Dragon Kid	0	Ryo Saito	2

Block A	Ben-K	Yasushi Kanda	Kzy	Shun Skywalker	YAMATO
Ben-K	X	Ben-K (9:07)	Draw (20:00)	Ben-K (9:15)	YAMATO (17:29)
Yasushi Kanda	Ben-K (9:07)	X	Kzy (9:15)	Skywalker (8:28)	Kanda (13:12)
Kzy	Draw (20:00)	Kzy (9:15)	X	Kzy (11:09)	YAMATO (19:42)
Shun Skywalker	Ben-K (9:15)	Skywalker (8:28)	Kzy (11:09)	X	YAMATO (8:26)
YAMATO	YAMATO (17:29)	Kanda (13:12)	YAMATO (19:42)	YAMATO (8:26)	X
Block B	Genki Horiguchi	BxB Hulk	Jason Lee	Big R Shimizu	Takashi Yoshida
Genki Horiguchi	X	Hulk (9:30)	Lee (7:33)	Horiguchi (10:19)	Horiguchi (12:09)
BxB Hulk	Hulk (9:30)	X	Lee (11:11)	Hulk (14:27)	Yoshida (15:10)
Jason Lee	Lee (7:33)	Lee (11:11)	X	Shimizu (10:11)	Yoshida (5:17)
Big R Shimizu	Horiguchi (10:19)	Hulk (14:27)	Shimizu (10:11)	X	Yoshida (2:17)
Takashi Yoshida	Horiguchi (12:09)	Yoshida (15:10)	Yoshida (5:17)	Yoshida (2:17)	X
Block C	Naruki Doi	Eita	Dragon Kid	Yosuke♥Santa Maria	Punch Tominaga
Naruki Doi	X	Doi (16:54)	Doi (forfeit)	Doi (12:02)	Doi (13:16)
Eita	Doi (16:54)	X	Eita (7:48)	Santa Maria (4:37)	Draw (20:00)
Dragon Kid	Doi (forfeit)	Eita (7:48)	X	Santa Maria (forfeit)	Tominaga (forfeit)
Yosuke♥Santa Maria	Doi (12:02)	Santa Maria (4:37)	Santa Maria (forfeit)	X	Tominaga (11:20)
Punch Tominaga	Doi (13:16)	Draw (20:00)	Tominaga (forfeit)	Tominaga (11:20)	X
Block D	Kagetora	Ryo Saito	Shingo Takagi	Susumu Yokosuka	Masato Yoshino
Kagetora	X	Draw (11:40)	Takagi (15:13)	Kagetora (10:10)	Double Pin (13:22)
Ryo Saito	Draw (11:40)	X	Draw (16:22)	Yokosuka (9:55)	Yoshino (9:41)
Shingo Takagi	Takagi (15:13)	Draw (16:22)	X	Yokosuka (17:38)	Takagi (18:38)
Susumu Yokosuka	Kagetora (10:10)	Yokosuka (9:55)	Yokosuka (17:38)	X	Yoshino (11:44)
Masato Yoshino	Double Pin (13:22)	Yoshino (9:41)	Takagi (18:38)	Yoshino (11:44)	X

King of Gate Semifinals
B1	Takashi Yoshida	Pin
D1	Masato Yoshino	16:40
A1	YAMATO	Pin
C1	Naruki Doi	23:16

King of Gate Finals
D1	Masato Yoshino	Pin
A1	YAMATO	23:16

Last Place Semifinals
A5	Yasushi Kanda	Pin
B5	Big R Shimizu	11:18
C4	Eita	Pin
D5	Ryo Saito	11:06

Last Place Finals
A5	Yasushi Kanda (Loser)	Pin
D5	Ryo Saito	13:16

=== 2019 ===
The 2019 King of Gate tournament, a round robin tournament, featuring 4 blocks took place from May 9 to June 8. The semi-finals and finals took place on June 6 and 8, respectively. U-T forfeited the rest of his matches due to injury. Ben-K is the first wrestler to go undefeated in the King of Gate tournament since the format change from single-elimination to round-robin.

Final Standings
Block A		Block B		Block C		Block D	
Kazma Sakamoto	8	Eita	10	Ben-K	10	KAI	7
Kzy	8	Susumu Yokosuka	8	YAMATO	6	Shun Skywalker	6
Naruki Doi	7	Masato Yoshino	6	Genki Horiguchi	4	Big R Shimizu	5
Ryo Saito	5	Yasushi Kanda	2	Kaito Ishida	4	Jason Lee	4
U-T	2	Yosuke♥Santa Maria	2	Takashi Yoshida	4	Dragon Kid	4
Punch Tominaga	0	Yuki Yoshioka	2	Kagetora	2	Masaaki Mochizuki	4

Block A	Kazma Sakamoto	Kzy	Naruki Doi	Punch Tominaga	Ryo Saito	U-T
Kazma Sakamoto	X	Sakamoto (14:52)	Doi (11:14)	Sakamoto (7:13)	Sakamoto (10:45)	Sakamoto (Forfeit)
Kzy	Sakamoto (14:52)	X	Kzy (14:05)	Kzy (10:01)	Kzy (15:38)	Kzy (10:55)
Naruki Doi	Doi (11:14)	Kzy (14:05)	X	Doi (9:11)	Draw (20:00)	Doi (Forfeit)
Punch Tominaga	Sakamoto (7:13)	Kzy (10:01)	Doi (9:11)	X	Saito (9:49)	U-T (8:39)
Ryo Saito	Sakamoto (10:45)	Kzy (15:38)	Draw (20:00)	Saito (9:49)	X	Saito (Forfeit)
U-T	Sakamoto (Forfeit)	Kzy (10:55)	Doi (Forfeit)	U-T (8:39)	Saito (Forfeit)	X
Block B	Eita	Masato Yoshino	Susumu Yokosuka	Yasushi Kanda	Yosuke♥Santa Maria	Yuki Yoshioka
Eita	X	Eita (4:08)	Eita (18:13)	Eita (6:52)	Eita (7:46)	Eita (9:16)
Masato Yoshino	Eita (4:08)	X	Yokosuka (14:30)	Yoshino (8:52)	Yoshino (4:51)	Yoshino (9:56)
Susumu Yokosuka	Eita (18:13)	Yokosuka (14:30)	X	Yokosuka (10:26)	Yokosuka (12:13)	Yokosuka (11:22)
Yasushi Kanda	Eita (6:52)	Yoshino (8:52)	Yokosuka (10:26)	X	Santa Maria (9:52)	Kanda (10:05)
Yosuke♥Santa Maria	Eita (7:46)	Yoshino (4:51)	Yokosuka (12:13)	Santa Maria (9:52)	X	Yoshioka (9:52)
Yuki Yoshioka	Eita (9:16)	Yoshino (9:56)	Yokosuka (11:22)	Kanda (10:05)	Yoshioka (9:52)	X
Block C	Ben-K	Genki Horiguchi	Kagetora	Kaito Ishida	Takashi Yoshida	YAMATO
Ben-K	X	Ben-K (10:56)	Ben-K (10:31)	Ben-K (11:56)	Ben-K (12:56)	Ben-K (17:01)
Genki Horiguchi	Ben-K (10:56)	X	Kagetora (7:54)	Horiguchi (7:08)	Yoshida (10:14)	Horiguchi (10:25)
Kagetora	Ben-K (10:31)	Kagetora (7:54)	X	Ishida (10:03)	Yoshida (9:12)	YAMATO (9:43)
Kaito Ishida	Ben-K (11:56)	Horiguchi (7:08)	Ishida (10:03)	X	Ishida (1:54)	YAMATO (15:08)
Takashi Yoshida	Ben-K (12:56)	Yoshida (10:14)	Yoshida (9:12)	Ishida (1:54)	X	YAMATO (15:34)
YAMATO	Ben-K (17:01)	Horiguchi (10:25)	YAMATO (9:43)	YAMATO (15:08)	YAMATO (15:34)	X
Block D	Big R Shimizu	Dragon Kid	Jason Lee	KAI	Masaaki Mochizuki	Shun Skywalker
Big R Shimizu	X	Shimizu (12:50)	Shimizu (10:51)	Draw (20:00)	Mochizuki (11:24)	Skywalker (12:29)
Dragon Kid	Shimizu (12:50)	X	Lee (11:15)	KAI (10:27)	Kid (12:19)	Kid (8:41)
Jason Lee	Shimizu (10:51)	Lee (11:15)	X	KAI (11:01)	Lee (17:00)	Skywalker (10:15)
KAI	Draw (20:00)	KAI (10:27)	KAI (11:01)	X	Mochizuki (11:49)	KAI (13:06)
Masaaki Mochizuki	Mochizuki (11:24)	Kid (12:19)	Lee (17:00)	Mochizuki (11:49)	X	Skywalker (11:28)
Shun Skywalker	Skywalker (12:29)	Kid (8:41)	Skywalker (10:15)	KAI (13:06)	Skywalker (11:28)	X

A Block Decision
A1	Kazma Sakamoto	Pin
A2	Kzy	3:28

Semifinals
A2	Kzy	Pin
C1	Ben-K	17:43
B1	Eita	Pin
D1	KAI	12:25

Finals
C1	Ben-K	Pin
B1	Eita	20:13

=== 2020 ===
The 2020 King of Gate tournament took place from May 15 to June 7, covering ten shows. Unlike the previous year, the tournament featured a singles elimination tournament contested by 24 wrestlers. Due to the coronavirus (COVID-19) pandemic in Japan, the tournament was held in empty arenas, with the tournament also being aired on tape delay.

First Round
H.Y.O	DQ
Kzy	9:08
Yamato	Pin
Ryo Saito	13:11
Dragon Kid	Pin
Diamante	10:53
Yosuke♥Santa Maria	Pin
Susumu Yokosuka	11:48

Second Round
Kzy	Pin
Yamato	14:12
Diamante	Pin
Yosuke♥Santa Maria	8:50

Quarterfinals
Yamato	Pin
Diamante	10:21

First Round
Jason Lee	Sub
Kaito Ishida	10:02
BxB Hulk	Pin
Keisuke Okuda	11:26
Genki Horiguchi	Pin
Kai	10:06
Big R Shimizu	Pin
Naruki Doi	4:38

Second Round
Kaito Ishida	CO
Keisuke Okuda	6:01
Kai	Pin
Naruki Doi	12:39

Quarterfinals
Kaito Ishida	Pin
Naruki Doi	14:10

First Round
Ben-K	Pin
Kagetora	11:04
Eita	Pin
Strong Machine J	14:21
Kazma Sakamoto	Pin
Masaaki Mochizuki	15:18
Dragon Dia	Pin
Takashi Yoshida	8:27

Second Round
Ben-K	Pin
Eita	13:14
Kazma Sakamoto	Pin
Dragon Dia	8:34

Quarterfinals
Eita	Pin
Dragon Dia	9:31

Semifinals
1	Naruki Doi*	Pin
4	Kaito Ishida	10:04
3	Eita	Pin
2	Yamato	15:56

Finals
Naruki Doi	Pin
Eita	18:52

* = Won a second chance battle royal also involving H.Y.O, Kzy, Ryo Saito, Yosuke♥Santa Maria, Genki Horiguchi, Jason Lee, Ben-K and Dragon Dia to secure the last semifinal spot.

=== 2021 ===
The 2021 King of Gate tournament took place from May 14 to June 3, covering fifteen shows. The tournament will see the return of the round-robin format, featuring 3 blocks. Repeating part of the previous year format, the final semifinal spot will be decided in a battle royal by a wrestler eliminated from the tournament. On May 7, it was announced that HipHop Kikuta would be forced to withdraw from the tournament, after suffering a shoulder injury, being replaced by his R.E.D stablemate H.Y.O. Ben-K forfeited all of his matches after testing positive for COVID-19. Naruki Doi, who wrestled Ben-K on the first day of the tournament, also withdrew from the tournament as a precaution.

Final Standings
Block A		Block B		Block C	
Kota Minoura	10	SB Kento	6	YAMATO	7
BxB Hulk	6	Dragon Kid	5	Shun Skywalker	6
Diamante	6	Eita	5	Keisuke Okuda	5
Takashi Yoshida	6	Jason Lee	5	Kaito Ishida	4
Naruki Doi	2	Susumu Yokosuka	5	U-T	4
Ben-K	0	Kzy	4	H.Y.O	0

Block A	Ben-K	Diamante	Naruki Doi	BxB Hulk	Kota Minoura	Takashi Yoshida
Ben-K	X	Diamante (Forfeit)	Doi (14:39)	Hulk (Forfeit)	Minoura (Forfeit)	Yoshida (Forfeit)
Diamante	Diamante (Forfeit)	X	Diamante (Forfeit)	Hulk (7:04)	Minoura (10:00)	Diamante (9:59)
Naruki Doi	Doi (14:39)	Diamante (Forfeit)	X	Hulk (Forfeit)	Minoura (Forfeit)	Yoshida (Forfeit)
BxB Hulk	Hulk (Forfeit)	Hulk (7:04)	Hulk (Forfeit)	X	Minoura (11:46)	Yoshida (9:36)
Kota Minoura	Minoura (Forfeit)	Minoura (10:00)	Minoura (Forfeit)	Minoura (11:46)	X	Minoura (13:00)
Takashi Yoshida	Yoshida (Forfeit)	Diamante (9:59)	Yoshida (Forfeit)	Yoshida (9:36)	Minoura (13:00)	X
Block B	Eita	SB Kento	Dragon Kid	Kzy	Jason Lee	Susumu Yokosuka
Eita	X	Eita (12:54)	Kid (17:44)	Kzy (18:02)	Eita (10:25)	Draw (20:00)
SB Kento	Eita (12:54)	X	Kid (9:23)	Kento (11:16)	Kento (13:10)	Kento (14:52)
Dragon Kid	Kid (17:44)	Kid (9:23)	X	Kzy (15:06)	Double Pin (12:04)	Yokosuka (16:13)
Kzy	Kzy (18:02)	Kento (11:16)	Kzy (15:06)	X	Lee (17:24)	Yokosuka (16:25)
Jason Lee	Eita (10:25)	Kento (13:10)	Double Pin (12:04)	Lee (17:24)	X	Lee (18:06)
Susumu Yokosuka	Draw (20:00)	Kento (14:52)	Yokosuka (16:13)	Yokosuka (16:25)	Lee (18:06)	X
Block C	U-T	H.Y.O	Kaito Ishida	Keisuke Okuda	Shun Skywalker	YAMATO
U-T	X	U-T (8:12)	Ishida (10:30)	U-T (1:58)	Skywalker (9:15)	YAMATO (17:48)
H.Y.O	U-T (8:12)	X	Ishida (7:33)	Okuda (10:53)	Double Countout (7:15)	Double Countout (5:35)
Kaito Ishida	Ishida (10:30)	Ishida (7:33)	X	Okuda (8:56)	Skywalker (14:03)	YAMATO (15:30)
Keisuke Okuda	U-T (1:58)	Okuda (10:53)	Okuda (8:56)	X	Skywalker (13:57)	Draw (20:00)
Shun Skywalker	Skywalker (9:15)	Double Countout (7:15)	Skywalker (14:03)	Skywalker (13:57)	X	YAMATO (16:12)
YAMATO	YAMATO (17:48)	Double Countout (5:35)	YAMATO (15:30)	Draw (20:00)	YAMATO (16:12)	X

Semifinals
A1	Kota Minoura	Pin
C1	YAMATO	11:13
B1	SB Kento	Pin
BRW	Kzy*	4:03

Finals
A1	Kota Minoura	Sub
BRW	Kzy	20:05

* = Won a second chance battle royal also involving H.Y.O, Shun Skywalker, Keisuke Okuda, Kaito Ishida, Diamante, BxB Hulk, Takashi Yoshida, Jason Lee, Dragon Kid, Susumu Yokosuka, and Eita to secure the last semifinal spot.

=== 2022 ===
The 2022 King of Gate took place between May 11th to June 3rd. The tournament reverted to a single elimination format, this time featuring 32 participants.

1st Round
Kai	Pin
Shuji Kondo	0:39
Jacky "Funky" Kamei	Pin
Yosuke Santa Maria	9:50
Kaito Ishida	Pin
Susumu Mochizuki	11:30
Keisuke Okuda	Pin
Mondai Ryu	10:55
Madoka Kikuta	Pin
SB Kento	7:43
BxB Hulk	Pin
Naruki Doi	13:55
Ben-K	Pin
Jason Lee	11:20
H.Y.O	DCO
Dragon Dia	14:59
Yuki Yoshioka	Pin
Yamato	13:01
U-T	Pin
Kagetora	8:02
Takuma Fujiwara	Draw
Ishin Iihashi	15:00
Dragon Kid	Pin
Diamante	12:12
Takashi Yoshida	Pin
Minorita	5:37
Kzy	Pin
Kota Minoura	13:30
Strong Machine J	Pin
La Estrella	10:19
Eita	Pin
Shun Skywalker	10:00

2nd Round
Shuji Kondo	Pin
Jacky "Funky" Kamei	8:01
Kaito Ishida	Stop
Keisuke Okuda	12:26
Madoka Kikuta	Pin
BxB Hulk	12:52
Jason Lee	Bye
-	-
Yuki Yoshioka	Pin
U-T	13:17
-	Bye
Diamante	-
Minorita	Pin
Kzy	10:42
Strong Machine J	Pin
Shun Skywalker	6:34

Quarterfinals
Shuji Kondo	Pin
Kaito Ishida	12:31
BxB Hulk	Pin
Jason Lee	6:22
Yuki Yoshioka	Pin
Diamante	11:39
Kzy	Pin
Shun Skywalker	20:40

Semifinals
Shuji Kondo	Pin
Kota Minoura*	4:14
Yuki Yoshioka	Pin
Shun Skywalker	9:48

Finals
Kota Minoura	Pin
Yuki Yoshioka	16:41

* = Won a second chance battle royal also involving H.Y.O, Kai, Dragon Dia, Yosuke Santa Maria, Mondai Ryu, Madoka Kikuta, Naruki Doi, Ben-K, U-T, Kagetora, Takuma Fujiwara, Ishin Iihashi, Kzy, Keisuke Okuda, Kaito Ishida, Diamante, BxB Hulk, Takashi Yoshida, Jacky "Funky" Kamei, SB Kento, Dragon Kid, Susumu Mochizuki, Yamato, Minorita, Strong Machine J, La Estrella and Eita to replace an injured Jason Lee in the semi-finals.

=== 2023 ===
The 2023 King of Gate took place between July 7th and August 3rd.

1st Round
Dragon Dia	Pin
Jason Lee	11:33
Yamato	Draw
Don Fujii	15:00
U-T	13:31
H.Y.O	Pin
Kzy	Pin
Eita	9:10
BxB Hulk	2:24
Punch Tominaga	Pin
Kota Minoura	Pin
Naruki Doi	13:05
Yuki Yoshioka	Pin
Jacky Kamei	9:53
Kagetora	12:15
Dragon Kid	Pin
Shun Skywalker	13:43
Big Boss Shimizu	Pin
Yasushi Kanda	Pin
Strong Machine J	8:26
Kai	10:46
Ben-K	Pin
Susumu Mochizuki
Diamante	Withdrawn
Shuji Kondo	Pin
Genki Horiguchi	7:39
Ishin	Pin
Minorita	7:56
Takashi Yoshida	Pin
Mondai Ryu	5:24
Masaaki Mochizuki	10:34
Madoka Kikuta	Pin

2nd Round
Dragon Dia	N/A
Bye
H.Y.O	Pin
Kzy	12:04
Punch Tominaga	3:34
Kota Minoura	Pin
Yuki Yoshioka	Pin
Dragon Kid	17:28
Big Boss Shimizu	Pin
Yasushi Kanda	3:43
Ben-K
Susumu Mochizuki	Bye
Shuji Kondo	Pin
Ishin	10:53
Takashi Yoshida	15:01
Madoka Kikuta	Pin

Quarterfinals
Dragon Dia	17:10
H.Y.O	Pin
Kota Minoura	Pin
Yuki Yoshioka	21:04
Big Boss Shimizu	Pin
Susumu Mochizuki	13:54
Shuji Kondo	20:43
Madoka Kikuta	Pin

Semifinals
H.Y.O	11:21
Kota Minoura	Pin
Big Boss Shimizu	16:37
Madoka Kikuta	Pin

Finals
Kota Minoura	14:34
Big Boss Shimizu	Pin

=== 2024 ===
The 2024 King of Gate tournament will take place from November 7 to December 3, covering sixteen shows. The tournament saw the return of the round-robin format, featuring 3 blocks. On November 8, it was announced that Dragon Kid suffered a neck injury and would forfeit the rest of his block matches. On November 30, Shun Skywalker forfeited his match that night due to illness.

Final Standings
Block A		Block B		Block C	
Kota Minoura	8	Masaaki Mochizuki	7	Dragon Dia	8
Luis Mante	7	Kzy	7	Yamato	7
Flamita	7	Shun Skywalker	6	Strong Machine J	5
Mochizuki Jr.	3	Madoka Kikuta	5	Ben-K	4
Ishin	3	Susumu Yokosuka	3	Big Boss Shimizu	4
Dragon Kid	0	H.Y.O	2	Jason Lee	2

Block A	Kid	Mante	Flamita	Mochizuki	Minoura	Ishin
Kid	—N/a	Mante (forfeit)	Flamita (6:05)	Mochizuki (forfeit)	Minoura (forfeit)	Ishin (forfeit)
Mante	Mante (forfeit)	—N/a	Draw (20:00)	Mante (9:16)	Mante (11:53)	Double; Countout (3:40)
Flamita	Flamita (6:05)	Draw (20:00)	—N/a	Flamita (6:18)	Minoura (11:35)	Flamita (9:41)
Mochizuki	Mochizuki (forfeit)	Mante (9:16)	Flamita (6:18)	—N/a	Minoura (2:53)	Draw (20:00)
Minoura	Minoura (forfeit)	Mante (11:53)	Minoura (11:35)	Minoura (2:53)	—N/a	Minoura (3:21)
Ishin	Ishin (forfeit)	Double; Countout (3:40)	Flamita (9:41)	Draw (20:00)	Minoura (3:21)	—N/a
Block B	Kikuta	H.Y.O	Kzy	Yokosuka	Mochizuki	Skywalker
Kikuta	—N/a	Kikuta (13:16)	Kikuta (16:04)	Draw (20:00)	Mochizuki (8:26)	Skywalker (15:53)
H.Y.O	Kikuta (13:16)	—N/a	Kzy (10:18)	Yokosuka (9:30)	H.Y.O (2:44)	Skywalker (2:10)
Kzy	Kikuta (16:04)	Kzy (10:18)	—N/a	Kzy (10:48)	Draw (20:00)	Kzy (forfeit)
Yokosuka	Draw (20:00)	Yokosuka (9:30)	Kzy (10:48)	—N/a	Mochizuki (10:05)	Skywalker (9:39)
Mochizuki	Mochizuki (8:26)	H.Y.O (2:44)	Draw (20:00)	Mochizuki (10:05)	—N/a	Mochizkui (11:46)
Skywalker	Skywalker (15:53)	Skywalker (2:10)	Kzy (forfeit)	Skywalker (9:39)	Mochizkui (11:46)	—N/a
Block C	Yamato	Dia	Ben-K	Machine	Shimuzu	Lee
Yamato	—N/a	Dia (17:35)	Yamato (17:32)	Draw (20:00)	Yamato (13:11)	Yamato (14:31)
Dia	Dia (17:35)	—N/a	Dia (13:06)	Machine (16:00)	Dia (12:34)	Dia (15:40)
Ben-K	Yamato (17:32)	Dia (13:06)	—N/a	Ben-K (11:00)	Ben-K (14:15)	Lee (9:51)
Machine	Draw (20:00)	Machine (16:00)	Ben-K (11:00)	—N/a	Shimuzu (11:00)	Machine (10:42)
Shimizu	Yamato (13:11)	Dia (12:34)	Ben-K (14:15)	Shimuzu (11:00)	—N/a	Shimizu (3:48)
Lee	Yamato (14:31)	Dia (15:40)	Lee (9:51)	Machine (10:42)	Shimizu (3:48)	—N/a

B Block Decision; Play-In
B1	Masaaki Mochizuki	Pin
B2	Kzy	11:36
A2 A3	Luis Mante Flamita	– 13:08
B2 C2	Kzy Yamato	Pin –

Semifinals
C1	Dragon Dia	Pin
B1	Masaaki Mochizuki	7:25
A1	Kota Minoura	Pin
PIW	Kzy	10:19

Finals
C1	Dragon Dia	22:30
A1	Kota Minoura	Pin

=== 2025 ===
The 2025 King of Gate took place between November 6 and December 3, with a 32-man single-elimination tournament format.

1st Round
Madoka Kikuta	17:36
Yuki Yoshioka	Pin
Takashi	13:11
U-T	Pin
Masaaki Mochizuki	7:40
Genki Horiguchi^{1}	Pin
Naruki Doi	10:06
Shun Skywalker	Pin
Luis Mante	9:15
Ishin	Pin
El Cucuy	Pin
Ryu Fuda	10:01
Kagetora	14:15
Jacky "Funky" Kamei	Pin
Susumu Yokosuka	Pin
Ben-K	16:00
Dragon Dia	10:33
Riiita	Pin
Kai	Pin
BxB Hulk	9:30
Ryoya Tanaka	Pin
Homare	8:52
Hyo	15:16
Yamato	Pin
Gianni Valletta	Pin
Dragon Kid	7:07
Kzy	Pin
Jason Lee	11:50
Mochizuki Jr.	9:30
Yoshiki Kato	Pin
Strong Machine J	5:28
El Cielo	Pin

2nd Round
Yuki Yoshioka	Pin
U-T	12:32
Genki Horiguchi	Pin
Shun Skywalker	2:04
Ishin	Pin
El Cucuy	5:13
Jacky "Funky" Kamei	Pin
Susumu Yokosuka	17:36
Riiita	Pin
Kai	10:44
Ryoya Tanaka	Forfeit^{2}
Yamato	Bye
Gianni Valletta	Pin
Kzy	9:20
Yoshiki Kato	Countout
El Cielo	10:14

Quarterfinals
Yuki Yoshioka	Pin
Genki Horiguchi	12:09
Ishin	Pin
Jacky "Funky" Kamei	9:36
Riiita	11:02
Yamato	Decision
Gianni Valletta	Pin
Yoshiki Kato	10:16

Semifinals
Yuki Yoshioka	11:10
Ishin	Pin
Riiita	9:39
Gianni Valletta	Pin

Finals
Ishin	13:25
Gianni Valletta	Pin

1 Horiguchi replaced Kota Minoura, who withdrew from the tournament due to a concussion.
2 Tanaka forfeited his second-round match to Yamato due to a shoulder injury.
