= Gamma (wrestler) =

Japanese wrestler (born 1973)

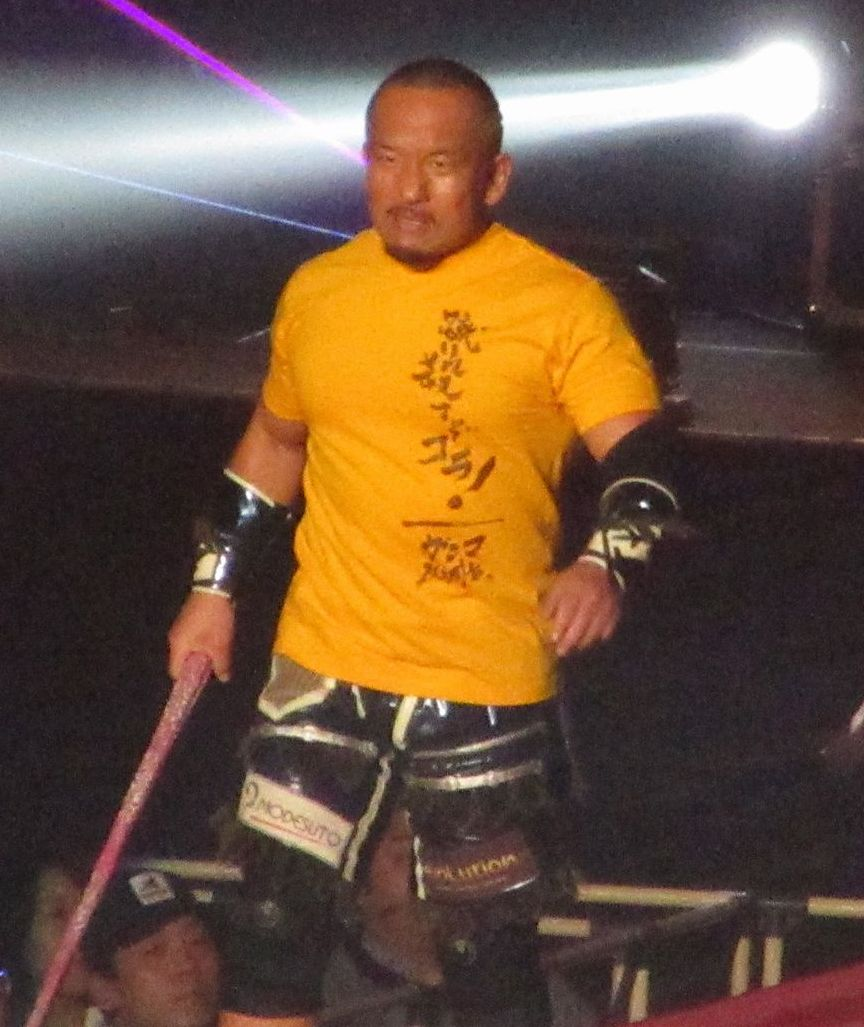
- Gamma in November 2016

Personal information
- Born: Yoshihito Sugamoto; May 16, 1973 (age 53) Iwaki, Fukushima, Japan

Professional wrestling career
- Ring name(s): Gamma; Gamma Daiou; Kishiwada King; Viewtiful Joe; Yoshihito Sugamoto
- Billed height: 1.70 m (5 ft 7 in)
- Billed weight: 82 kg (181 lb; 12.9 st)
- Trained by: Super Delfin
- Debut: April 23, 1996

Yoshihito Sugamoto (菅本 儀人, Sugamoto Yoshihito; born May 16, 1973), better known by the ring name Gamma, is a Japanese professional wrestler. He is best known for his Dragon Gate tenure.

== Professional wrestling career ==
Yoshihito Sugamoto began his career in Michinoku Pro Wrestling when he entered their dojo along with Makoto Saito and Susumu Mochizuki. He wrestled in several dark matches against Wellington Wilkins, but eventually left the promotion before gaining any status. A year later, he joined Osaka Pro Wrestling.

=== Osaka Pro Wrestling (1999–2005) ===
Sugamoto spent some years in the low card of Osaka Pro until finally breaking up in 2001, where he adopted the ring name of Gamma and the gimmick of a young punk. Turning heel, he joined Dick Togo's stable FLUXxx, whose leadership he inherited after Togo departed. Flanked by Big Boss MA-G-MA and Daio QUALLT, he achieved OPW's top heel status and feuded with Super Delfín and the rest of babyface wrestlers of the company. This lasted until 2003, when his henchmen betrayed him, kicked him out of the faction and renamed it Kishiwada Gurentai. Now as a face, Gamma allied himself with Delfín and his people and formed a tag team with Takehiro Murahama. However, a recurrent shoulder injury impeded him from recovering momentum, and in April 2005 he decided to leave the promotion.

=== Independent circuit (2005–2006) ===
After leaving OPW, Gamma started appearing as a freelancer in Michinoku Pro Wrestling and Pro Wrestling Zero1, again as a villainous character. His activity in M-Pro was mainly outside of the rings, but he managed to corrupt the Sato brothers into turning heel, attacking The Great Sasuke and helping him form the group STONED. At the same time, he exerted his influence over his tag team partner in Zero1, Takuya Sugawara, turning him into an honorary STONED member. Gamma also appeared in Dragondoor, teaming up with yet another STONED recruit, Kagetora, who he appointed as the stable's next leader after Gamma signed up with Dragon Gate.

=== Dragon Gate (2006–2022) ===
He turned up in Dragon Gate on March 19, 2006, being brought in by Magnitude Kishiwada (previously known as Big Boss MA-G-MA) to take over his position in Blood Generation while he recuperated from a severe shoulder injury. He and stable head CIMA took an instant dislike to each other, however, and he was soon kicked out of the faction. Naruki Doi, Masato Yoshino, and Naoki Tanizaki followed him, causing Blood Generation to split in two, with them on one side and CIMA, Don Fujii and Shingo Takagi on the other. On April 23, 2006, he and Doi beat CIMA and Fujii in a tag match to earn full rights to the Blood Generation name, but they immediately renounced it, instead forming the Muscle Outlaw'z faction. Though Naruki Doi was seen as the leader, Gamma was considered a co-leader or even the real leader. The split also marked the beginning of a long feud he would have with CIMA.

As September 2007 neared, he challenged the group's personal referee Kinta Tamaoka to a match on September 22 where the loser would be banished from Muscle Outlaw'z, after Tamaoka had cost the group several matches due to misaimed protein powder attacks. He lost the match when the whole stable surprisingly interfered on Tamaoka's behalf, so he left the stable and also seemingly left Dragon Gate when he had his contract annulled soon after. However, he would return a month later, saving Typhoon and New Hazard from a MO'z beatdown, and pledged his allegiance to Typhoon. It was all a ruse, as he immediately attacked CIMA and rejoined MO'z, and then he and the others members mobbed Tamaoka and kicked him out.

After he returned, he was no longer treated as a top line player, instead wrestling mainly in tag matches in the midcards. However, at the end of the year, he won the King of Gate Tournament, beating CIMA in the finals. The victory came by referee stoppage, after he low-blowed CIMA and rendered him unable to continue. Speculation still exists as to whether this was the intended finish to the match or not, but nevertheless, his victory won him the right to face CIMA for his Open the Dream Gate Title, which was set for February 3, 2008. CIMA defeated him, and in the process settled their long feud.

On April 27, he captured the vacant Open the Brave Gate Championship, beating previous champion Anthony W. Mori in a tournament final. After winning it, he discarded the eight pieces that made up the logo plate on the belt's face and replaced it with his own plate, and renamed the title the Open the Gamma Gate Championship. During his reign, he mostly defended the belt against weak opponents, and sometimes retained his title through outrageous means, thanks to him going under his real name and playing the role of the belt's corrupt commissioner, with stablemate Genki Horiguchi enforcing the rules as secretary of the commissioner. He became a dual champion on May 14, when he, Shingo Takagi and YAMATO won the newly vacated Open the Triangle Gate titles, beating Naruki Doi, Masato Yoshino and BxB Hulk in a decision match. Both of his reigns were brought to an end on June 28 and 29: He and his team lost the Triangle Gate to Kenichiro Arai, Taku Iwasa and Shinobu on the former date (where he took the fall), and on the latter date he lost the Gamma Gate title when Masato Yoshino, as Dr. Muscle, defeated him, and the Brave Gate's faceplate was restored to the belt. He would win the Triangle Gate titles back with Yasushi Kanda and YAMATO on July 12, and lost them to Masaaki Mochizuki, Don Fujii and Magnitude Kishiwada on September 28. He then got into a brief feud with BxB Hulk's "Killer Hulk" persona, and even came up with his own "killer" persona, Gamma Daiou, but he would lose their match on November 16 by countout after Hulk put him through a table on the outside with his E.V.O. finisher.

Shortly after losing the Triangle Gate titles, he began to have problems with Yasushi Kanda. These problems escalated when Kanda began to misfire on protein powder attacks during their tag matches, blinding him instead of their opponents and costing them the matches. He even chastized Kanda to the point that Kanda told him that he would rather team with Cyber Kongcito than him. Eventually, a match was made - at the request of YAMATO - between him and Kanda for January 18, 2009, where the loser would be kicked out of Real Hazard. He got the victory, but then, Kenichiro Arai came out, seemingly to assist Kanda from a beatdown by him and the rest of Real Hazard. However, Arai attacked him, and then he, Kanda, and the other group members beat him down and booted him out of their ranks.

He began making a slow turn to the face side for the first time in his career, but a shadow of doubt was cast over his future in Dragon Gate. On February 15, he came to the aid of Susumu Yokosuka after Ryo Saito had turned on him to join Real Hazard and he and the stable were beating him down. This led to him and Yokosuka challenging for the Open the Twin Gate titles held by YAMATO & Cyber Kong on March 1, but with the added stipulation that he would be permanently banished from Dragon Gate if he lost. However, he and Yokosuka pulled through and won the titles after some assistance from Real Hazard member KAGETORA, and when CIMA made his return that night, he brought them and KAGETORA into his new WARRIORS-5 stable. On April 15, he, CIMA & KAGETORA won the Open the Triangle Gate titles from Shingo Takagi, Taku Iwasa & Dragon Kid, but on May 5 he and Yokosuka lost the Twin Gate titles to Ryo Saito & Genki Horiguchi in a three-way Match, which included Kenichiro Arai & Yasushi Kanda. A month later, he, CIMA & KAGETORA would lose the Triangle Gate to Masato Yoshino, BxB Hulk & PAC.

In August 2009, he and CIMA participated in the annual Summer Adventure Tag League Tournament, but they performed very poorly, winning only one match out of eight and finishing in last place. However, they would win the Open the Twin Gate Titles on December 29, beating champions Shingo Takagi & YAMATO. Then, they strangely turned the belts in, declaring themselves to be only tentative champions, and announced their desire to face a strong team to determine the actual champions. On February 10, he and CIMA defeated Naruki Doi & Masato Yoshino to become the full champions. On March 22 they lost the titles to Shingo and Cyber Kong. On May 13, 2010, Gamma, CIMA and Genki Horiguchi defeated Don Fujii, Masaaki Mochizuki and Akebono to win the Open the Triangle Gate Championship. On October 25, 2010, Gamma, CIMA and Horiguchi lost the Open the Triangle Gate Championship to Naoki Tanisaki, Yasushi Kanda and Takuya Sugawara. On November 13, Gamma betrayed WARRIORS by revealing his partner as Naruki Doi for his upcoming Twin Gate championship match at Gate of Destiny, joining Doi's unnamed unit. On November 23, 2010, Gamma and Doi defeated K-ness and Susumu Yokosuka to win the Open the Twin Gate Championship. They would lose the title to Don Fujii and Masaaki Mochizuki on January 10, 2011. On January 14, 2011, Doi's unnamed unit aligned themselves with the WARRIORS stable, who turned heel in the process. On January 18 the new group was named Blood Warriors. On May 27, the rest of Blood Warriors turned on Gamma and gave his spot in the group to Kzy. Gamma then went on to join Masaaki Mochizuki's Junction Three stable. On June 18, Gamma, Masato Yoshino and YAMATO defeated the Blood Warriors team of CIMA, Naruki Doi and BxB Hulk to win the vacant Open the Triangle Gate Championship. They would go on to lose the title to the Blood Warriors team of Kzy, Naoki Tanisaki and Naruki Doi on September 2. On January 21, Gamma was pinned in a six-man "Loser Leaves Unit" match and was as a result forced to leave Junction Three. After aligning with Kaettekita Veteran-gun, Gamma and stablemates HUB and Magnitude Kishiwada won the Open the Triangle Championship on October 21. They lost the title to Masato Yoshino, Naruki Doi and Shachihoko BOY just a month later. On June 14, 2015, he, CIMA and Don Fujii defeated the Jimmyz (Ryo "Jimmy" Saito, Genki Horiguchi H.A.Gee.Mee!!, and Jimmy Susumu) to win the Open the Triangle Gate Championship. On October 8, Gamma formed a new unit with CIMA, Eita, El Lindaman, Punch Tominaga, and rookies Takehiro Yamamura and Kaito Ishida. On November 1, the unit was named Over Generation. The same day, he, CIMA, and Don Fujii defended the Open the Triangle Gate Championship against the Jimmyz (Jimmy Susumu, Jimmy K-Ness J.K.S., and Ryo "Jimmy" Saito), and vacated the titles afterwards.

== Championships and accomplishments ==
- Dragon Gate
  - Dragon Gate Open the Brave Gate Championship (1 time)
  - Dragon Gate Open the Twin Gate Championship (5 times) – with Susumu Yokosuka (1), CIMA (3) and Naruki Doi (1)
  - Dragon Gate Open the Triangle Gate Championship (13 times) – with Naruki Doi and Masato Yoshino (3), Naruki Doi and Magnitude Kishiwada (1), YAMATO and Shingo Takagi (1), Yasushi Kanda and Yamato (1), CIMA and KAGETORA (1), CIMA and Genki Horiguchi (2), Masato Yoshino and YAMATO (1), Hub and Magnitude Kishiwada (1) and Cima and Don Fujii (2), Strong Machine F and Strong Machine J (1)
  - King of Gate (2007)
- Osaka Pro Wrestling
  - Osaka Pro Wrestling Championship (1 time)
  - Osaka Pro Wrestling Tag Team Championship (3 time) – with Daio QUALLT, Super Shisa (1) and Super Delfin (1)
  - Osaka Pro Tag Festival (2001) – with Daio QUALLT
- Pro Wrestling Illustrated
  - PWI ranked him #198 of the top 500 wrestlers in the PWI 500 in 2012

=== Luchas de Apuestas record ===
Winner (wager)	Loser (wager)	Location	Event	Date	Notes
Gamma (hair)	CIMA (hair)	Osaka, Japan	Live event	November 23, 2006	
Anthony W. Mori (hair)	Gamma (hair)	Nagoya, Japan	Live event	August 11, 2007	(Note: This was a tag team Hair vs. Mask match, where Mori teamed with Dragon Kid and Gamma with Kinta Tamaoka.)
