= Open the Brave Gate Championship =

Professional wrestling championship

Open the Brave Gate
- Current design of the Open the Brave Gate Championship (2019 – present)

Details
- Promotion: Dragongate
- Date established: March 13, 2005
- Current champion: Homare
- Date won: November 5, 2026
Statistics
- First champion: Naruki Doi
- Most reigns: Masato Yoshino (6 reigns)
- Longest reign: Pac (447 days)
- Shortest reign: Anthony W. Mori and Masato Yoshino/Dr. Muscle (<1 day)
- Oldest champion: Dragon Kid (50 years, 7 months and 10 days)
- Youngest champion: Flamita (19 years, 3 months and 16 days)
- Heaviest champion: Pac (194 lbs)
- Lightest champion: Kotoka (145 lbs)

The Open the Brave Gate Championship (オープン・ザ・ブレイブゲート王座, Ōpun za Bureibugēto Ōza) is a professional wrestling title created and promoted by the Japanese promotion Dragongate. It has a weight limit of 82 kg (181 lb), though it has been won and defended against heavier wrestlers in the past. It can be considered the secondary singles title in Dragongate and is more of a light heavyweight championship.

== History ==
The championship was created on March 13, 2005 when Naruki Doi defeated Yossino in a tournament final.

=== Belt design ===
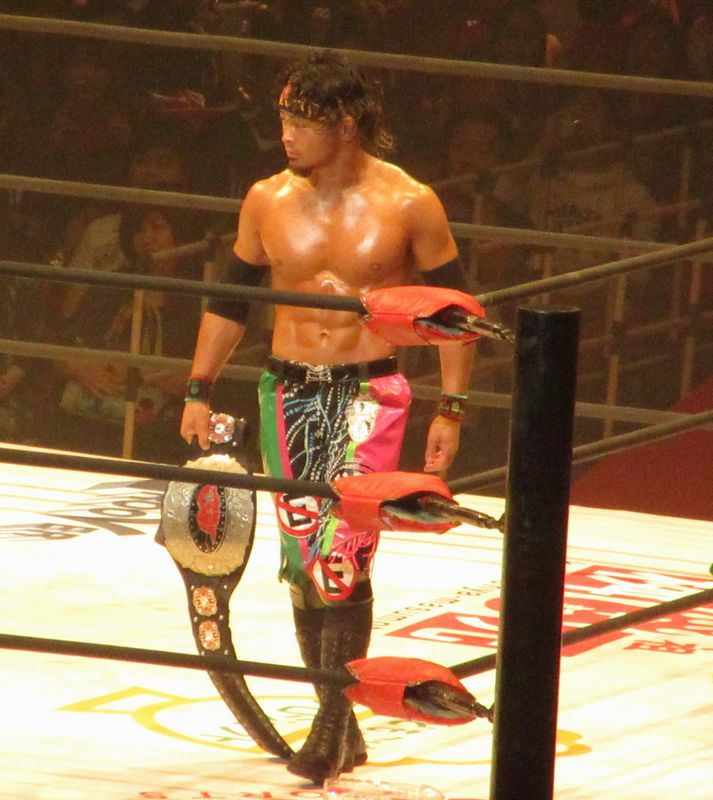
Eita with the (2005–2019) design of the title in November 2016.

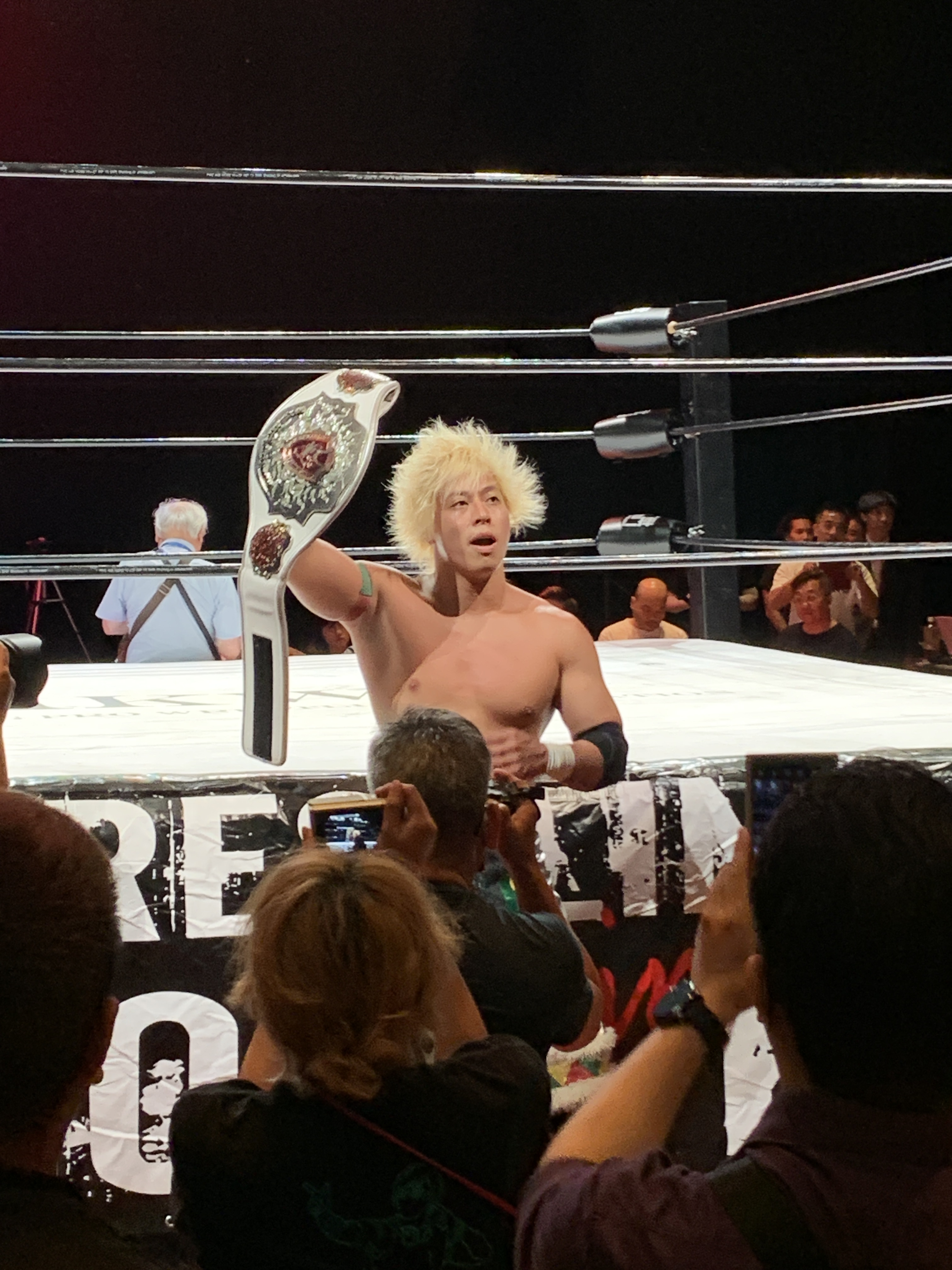
Jason Lee with the current design of the title (2019–present).

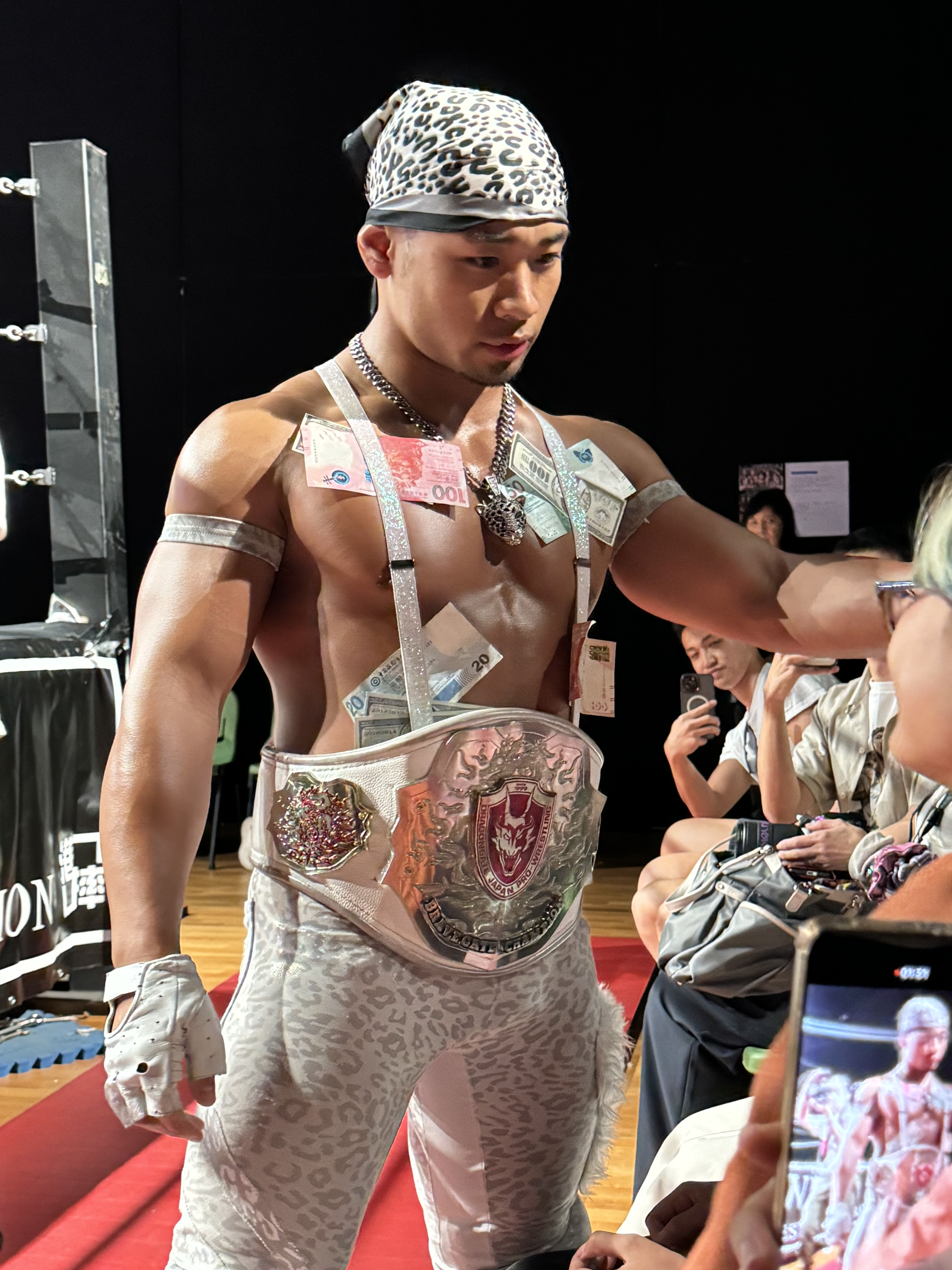
H.Y.O with a closer look to the current belt design.

The first design of the belt, from 2005 to 2019, had the faceplate logo divided into eight pieces, each representing the eight wrestlers who fought in the tournament to determine the inaugural champion. During Gamma's reign, he threw away all eight pieces of the faceplate and replaced it with his own plate, renaming it Open the Gamma Gate, and dictating and often changing the rules of his title defenses. This ended when Masato Yoshino, wrestling as the masked Dr. Muscle, defeated Gamma and restored it to the Brave Gate title, vacating it soon afterwards.

== Reigns ==
As of November 5, 2026, there have been a total of 57 reigns shared between 36 different champions. The current champion is Homare who is in his first reign.

Key
No.	Overall reign number
Reign	Reign number for the specific champion
Days	Number of days held
Defenses	Number of successful defenses
<1	Reign lasted less than a day
+	Current reign is changing daily

No.	Champion	Championship change			Reign statistics			Notes	Ref.
No.	Champion	Date	Event	Location	Reign	Days	Defenses	Notes	Ref.
Dragon Gate
1	Naruki Doi	March 13, 2005	The Brave Gate 2005	Nagoya, Japan	1	245	5	Doi defeated Yossino in a tournament final to become the inaugural champion.	
2	Dragon Kid	November 13, 2005	Crown Gate 2005	Nagoya, Japan	1	84	1		
—	Vacated	February 5, 2006	Primal Gate 2006	Fukuoka, Japan	—	—	—	The championship was vacated due to a title defense against Masato Yoshino ending in a no contest after outside interference from both men's factions.	
3	Masato Yoshino	March 19, 2006	Brave Gate 2006	Kawagoe, Japan	1	330	4	Yoshino defeated Dragon Kid and Naoki Tanizaki in a three-way elimination tournament final to win the vacant championship.	
4	Matt Sydal	February 12, 2007	Truth Gate 2007	Kobe, Japan	1	41	1		
5	Genki Horiguchi	March 25, 2007	Memorial Gate 2007	Tsu, Japan	1	98	2		
6	Yasushi Kanda	July 1, 2007	Kobe Pro-Wrestling Festival 2007	Kobe, Japan	1	83	2		
7	Masato Yoshino	September 22, 2007	Storm Gate 2007: Dragon Storm	Tokyo, Japan	2	204	6		
8	Anthony W. Mori	April 13, 2008	The Gate of Passion 2008	Nagoya, Japan	1	<1	0		
—	Vacated	April 13, 2008	The Gate of Passion 2008	Nagoya, Japan	—	—	—	The championship was vacated voluntarily by Anthony W. Mori due to Yasushi Kanda interfering in his title win.	
9	Gamma	April 27, 2008	The Gate of Passion 2008	Fukuoka, Japan	1	63	0	Gamma defeated Anthony W. Mori in a tournament final to win the vacant championship. The title was renamed "Open the Gamma Gate" during his reign. Gamma successfully defended his Open the Gamma Gate six times but none of the defenses were not counted as part of the official Brave Gate lineage.	
10	Dr. Muscle	June 29, 2008	The Gate of Maximum 2008	Osaka, Japan	3	<1	0	The championship was Renamed back to "Open the Brave Gate". This was Masato Yoshino disguised as Dr. Muscle but the reign is recognized as a Dr. Muscle reign.	
—	Vacated	June 29, 2008	The Gate of Maximum 2008	Osaka, Japan	—	—	—	Masato Yoshino vacated the championship.	
11	Genki Horiguchi	July 27, 2008	Kobe World Pro Wrestling Festival 2008	Kobe, Japan	2	77	2	Horiguchi defeated m.c.KZ to win the vacant championship.	
12	Masato Yoshino	October 12, 2008	The Gate of Victory 2008	Nagoya, Japan	4	161	2		
13	Cima	March 22, 2009	The Gate of Anniversary	Tokyo, Japan	1	119	3		
14	Naruki Doi	July 19, 2009	Kobe Pro-Wrestling Festival 2009	Kobe, Japan	2	9	0	This was a title vs. title match in which Doi also defended the Open the Dream Gate Championship.	
—	Vacated	July 28, 2009	—	—	—	—	—	The championship was vacated due to Naruki Doi also holding the Open the Dream Gate Championship.	
15	Naoki Tanizaki	August 30, 2009	Storm Gate 2009	Fukuoka, Japan	1	134	6	Tanizaki defeated Kagetora in a tournament final for the vacant championship.	
16	K-ness	January 11, 2010	Primal Gate 2010	Nagoya, Japan	1	47	1		
17	Super Shisa	February 27, 2010	Truth Gate 2010	Nagoya, Japan	1	50	1		
18	Tigers Mask	April 18, 2010	The Gate of Passion 2010	Osaka, Japan	1	118	3		
19	Masato Yoshino	August 14, 2010	Summer Adventure Tag League IV	Kobe, Japan	5	<1	0		
—	Vacated	August 14, 2010	Summer Adventure Tag League IV	Kobe, Japan	—	—	—	The championship was vacated due to Masato Yoshino also holding the Open the Dream Gate Championship.	
20	Pac	August 29, 2010	Storm Gate 2010	Fukuoka, Japan	1	447	11	Pac defeated Susumu Yokosuka in a tournament final to win the vacant championship.	
21	Ricochet	November 19, 2011	Crown Gate 2011	Osaka, Japan	1	169	3		
22	Dragon Kid	May 6, 2012	Dead or Alive 2012	Nagoya, Japan	2	364	9		
23	Masato Yoshino	May 5, 2013	Dead or Alive 2013	Nagoya, Japan	6	117	4		
—	Vacated	August 30, 2013	The Gate of Generation 2013	Kobe, Japan	—	—	—	Masato Yoshino vacated the championship, feeling it belonged to the younger generation.	
24	Genki Horiguchi H.A.Gee.Mee!!	September 29, 2013	Summer Adventure Tag League 2013	Kobe, Japan	3	168	4	H.A.Gee.Mee!! defeated Kzy in the finals of a tournament to win the vacant championship.	
25	Flamita	March 16, 2014	Memorial Gate 2014 in Wakayama	Wakayama, Japan	1	290	9		
—	Vacated	December 31, 2014	—	—	—	—	—	The championship was declared vacant three days after Flamita left the belt in the ring in protest, following his ninth defense ending in a disqualification.	
26	Kzy	January 12, 2015	Open the New Year Gate 2015	Kobe, Japan	1	47	1	Kzy, as the masked Dr. Muscle, defeated Eita in the finals of a tournament to win the vacant championship. Kzy was unmasked on January 16, 2015.	
27	Akira Tozawa	February 28, 2015	Champion Gate 2015 in Osaka	Osaka, Japan	1	246	6		
28	Kotoka	November 1, 2015	Gate of Destiny 2015	Osaka, Japan	1	125	1		
29	Yosuke♥Santa Maria	March 5, 2016	Champion Gate 2016 in Osaka: Sumoz Osaka Basho	Osaka, Japan	1	141	2		
30	Eita	July 24, 2016	Kobe Pro-Wrestling Festival 2016	Kobe, Japan	1	223	4		
—	Vacated	March 4, 2017	Champion Gate 2017 in Osaka	Osaka, Japan	—	—	—	The championship was vacated due to a match between Eita and El Lindaman being declared as no contest, due to multiple interference.	
31	Jimmy Kagetora	March 20, 2017	Memorial Gate 2017 in Wakayama	Wakayama, Japan	1	278	4	Kagetora defeated El Lindaman in a tournament final to win the vacant championship.	
32	Yasushi Kanda	December 23, 2017	The Final Gate 2017	Fukuoka, Japan	2	70	0		
33	Punch Tominaga	March 3, 2018	Champion Gate in Osaka 2018	Osaka, Japan	1	18	0		
—	Vacated	March 21, 2018	—	—	—	—	—	The championship was vacated after a Punch Tominaga's title defense against Yasushi Kanda ended in no contest.	
34	Dragon Kid	April 6, 2018	The Gate of Passion 2018	Tokyo, Japan	3	107	1	Dragon Kid defeated Kagetora to win the vacant championship.	
35	Eita	July 22, 2018	Kobe Pro-Wrestling Festival 2018	Kobe, Japan	2	64	1		
36	Dragon Kid	September 24, 2018	Dangerous Gate 2018	Tokyo, Japan	4	178	2		
37	Susumu Yokosuka	March 21, 2019	Memorial Gate in Wakayama 2019	Wakayama, Japan	1	228	4		
38	Kaito Ishida	November 4, 2019	Gate of Destiny 2019	Osaka, Japan	1	365	4		
39	Keisuke Okuda	November 3, 2020	Gate of Destiny 2020	Osaka, Japan	1	270	5		
40	Genki Horiguchi	July 31, 2021	Kobe Pro Wrestling Festival 2021	Kobe, Japan	4	1	0		
41	Kagetora	August 1, 2021	Speed Star Final 2021	Kobe, Japan	2	7	0		
42	SB Kento	August 8, 2021	The Gate Of Adventure 2021	Nagoya, Japan	1	1	0		
—	Vacated	August 9, 2021	—	—	—	—	—	The championship was vacated after a title defense against Keisuke Okuda ended in a no-contest.	
43	SB Kento	September 11, 2021	Storm Gate 2021	Osaka, Japan	2	123	4	Defeated Keisuke Okuda to win the vacant title.	
44	Dragon Dia	January 12, 2022	Open the New Year Gate 2022	Tokyo, Japan	1	199	3		
45	H.Y.O	July 30, 2022	Kobe World 2022 - Ultimo Dragon Debut 35th Anniversary	Kobe, Japan	1	148	4		
46	Minorita	December 25, 2022	Final Gate 2022	Fukuoka, Japan	1	69	0		
47	Jason Lee	March 4, 2023	Champion Gate in Osaka 2023 - Night 1	Osaka, Japan	1	120	1		
48	Ishin	July 2, 2023	Kobe Festival 2023	Kobe, Japan	1	99	1		
49	Kzy	October 9, 2023	Gate Of Origin 2023	Sendai, Japan	2	5	0		
50	Ishin	October 14, 2023	Gate Of Victory 2023	Kobe, Japan	2	52	1		
51	Hyo	December 5, 2023	Fantastic Gate 2023	Tokyo, Japan	2	229	7		
52	Dragon Dia	July 21, 2024	Kobe Pro-Wrestling Festival 2024	Kobe, Japan	2	147	3		
53	Yamato	December 15, 2024	Final Gate 2024	Fukuoka, Japan	1	113	1	This was a winner takes all match also disputed for Yamato's Open the Dream Gate Championship in which Dia cashed in his King of Gate contract.	
—	Vacated	April 7, 2025	Gate Of Passion 2025	Tokyo, Japan	—	—	—	Yamato vacated the title due to also holding the Open the Dream Gate Championship.	
54	U-T	May 5, 2025	Dead Or Alive 2025	Nagoya, Japan	1	69	1	Defeated Homare in a tournament final to win the vacant title.	
55	Ryoya Tanaka	July 13, 2025	Kobe Pro-Wrestling Festival 2025	Kobe, Japan	1	427	12		
56	Dragon Kid	September 13, 2026	Tokio ∞ hPa 2026 ~Tokyo Infinity Hectopascal~	Tokyo, Japan	5	7	0		
—	Vacated	September 20, 2026	Tohoku Dragongateway 2026	Sendai, Japan	—	—	—	The championship was vacated due to the circumstances surrounding the ending to Dragon Kid's defense against Ryu Fuda. Fuda defeated Kid with the assistance of Ishin, leading to Ryo Saito voiding the title change and vacating the championship.	
57	Homare	November 5, 2026	The Gate Of Evolution 2026	Tokyo, Japan	1	0+	0	Defeated Dragon Kid in a tournament final to win the vacant title.	

== Combined reigns ==
As of November 5, 2026.

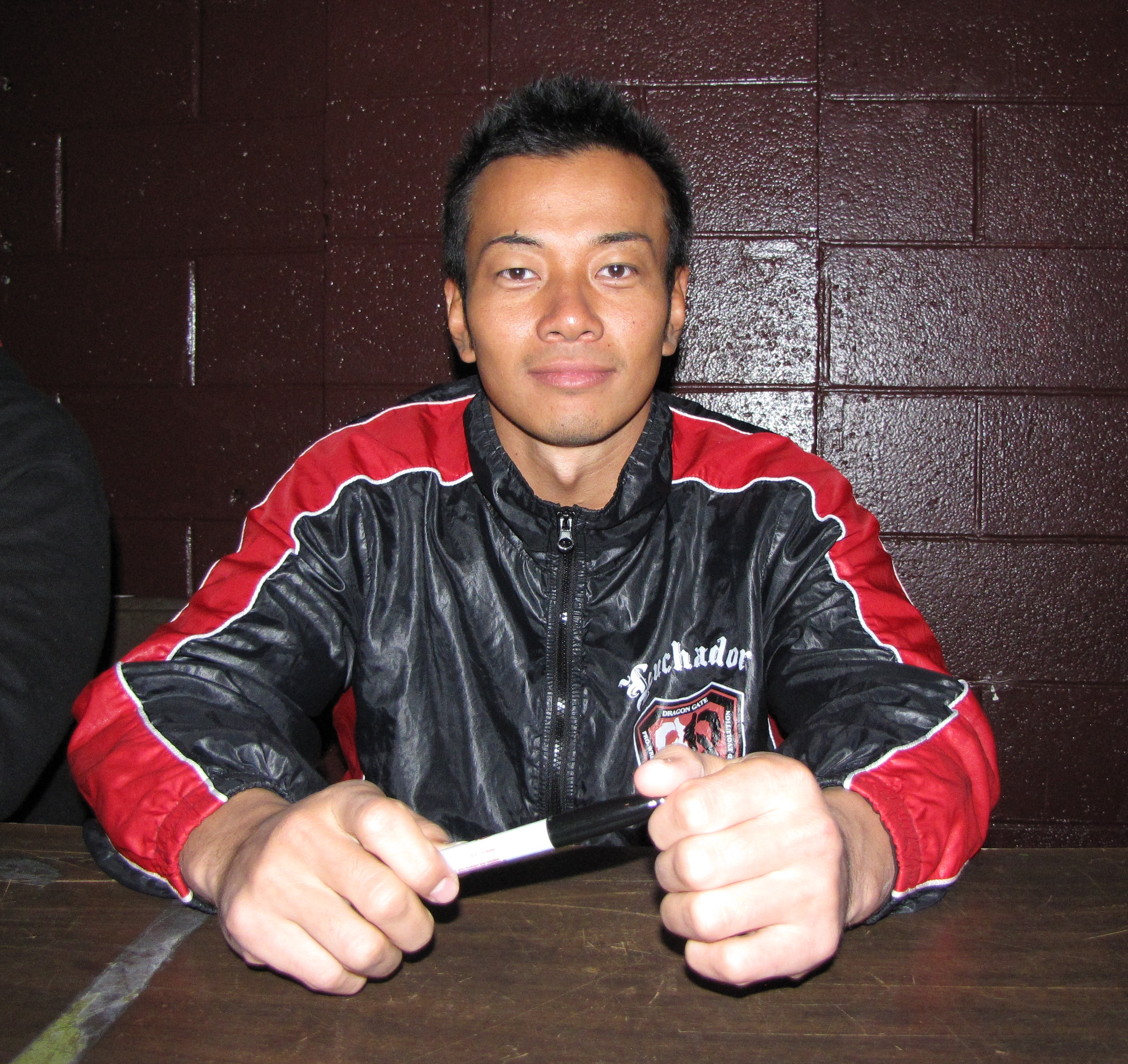
Record six-time champion Masato Yoshino/Dr. Muscle.

†	Indicates the current champion

Rank	Wrestler	No. of Reigns	Combined defenses	Combined days
1	Masato Yoshino/Dr. Muscle	6	16	813
2	Dragon Kid	5	13	740
3	Pac	1	11	447
4	Ryoya Tanaka	1	12	427
5	H.Y.O/Hyo	2	11	377
6	Kaito Ishida	1	4	365
7	Dragon Dia	2	6	346
8	Genki Horiguchi/H.A.Gee.Mee!!	4	8	344
9	Flamita	1	9	290
10	Eita	2	5	287
11	Jimmy Kagetora/Kagetora	2	5	286
12	Keisuke Okuda	1	5	270
13	Naruki Doi	2	5	254
14	Akira Tozawa	1	6	246
15	Susumu Yokosuka	1	4	228
16	Ricochet	1	3	169
17	Yasushi Kanda	2	1	153
18	Ishin	2	2	151
19	Yosuke ♥ Santa Maria	1	2	141
20	Naoki Tanizaki	1	6	134
21	Kotoka	1	1	125
22	SB Kento	2	4	124
23	Jason Lee	1	1	120
24	Cima	1	3	119
25	Tigers Mask	1	3	118
26	Yamato	1	1	113
27	U-T	1	1	69
27	Minorita	1	0	69
29	Gamma	1	0	63
30	Kzy	2	1	52
31	Super Shisa	1	1	50
32	K-ness	1	1	47
33	Matt Sydal	1	1	41
34	Punch Tominaga	1	0	18
35	Homare †	1	0	0+
36	Anthony W. Mori	1	0	<1

== Notes ==
1. – On May 20, 2014, Flamita successfully defended the title against Drastik Boy, Kaleth and Shane Strickland at a Desastre Total Ultraviolento (DTU) event in Pachuca, Mexico. Although Dragon Gate has not recognized the defense, it is included here.

== See also ==
- Dragon Gate
- Open the Dream Gate Championship
