= Keisuke Okuda =

Japanese professional wrestler

- 奥田啓介
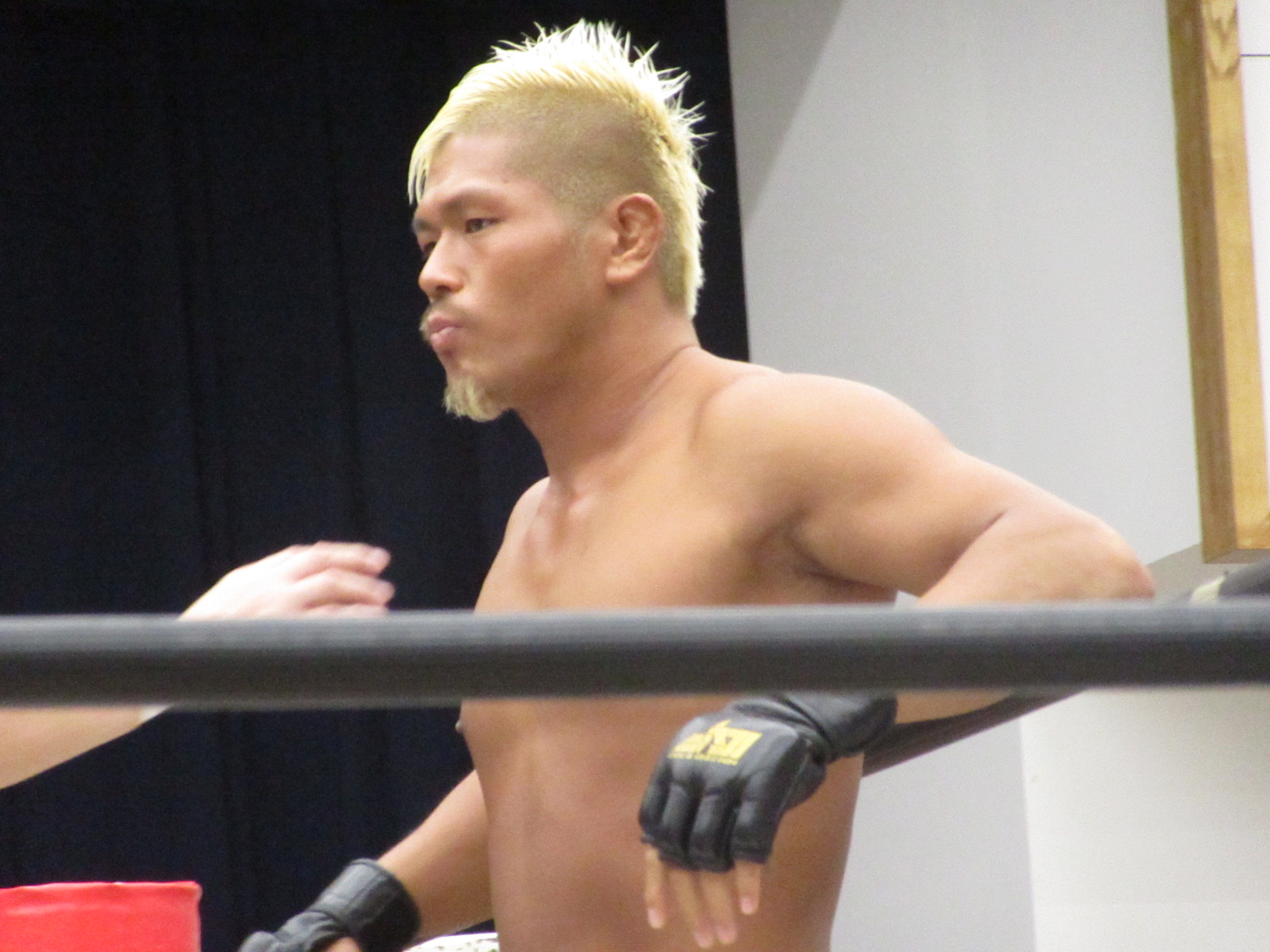
- Okuda in November 2018
- Born: June 5, 1991 (age 35); Tsu, Mie, Japan
- Professional wrestling career
- Billed height: 172 cm (5 ft 8 in)
- Billed weight: 73 kg (161 lb)
- Debut: November 3, 2009
- Martial arts career
- Nationality: Japanese
- Height: 5 ft 8 in (173 cm)
- Weight: 145 lb (66 kg)
- Division: Featherweight
- Years active: 2015–2022

Mixed martial arts record
- Total: 5
- Wins: 0
- Losses: 5
- By knockout: 3
- By submission: 1
- By disqualification: 1

Other information
- Mixed martial arts record from Sherdog
- Last updated on: May 20, 2025

Keisuke Okuda (奥田啓介, Okuda Keisuke; born June 5, 1991) is a Japanese professional wrestler and mixed martial artist currently working as a freelancer. He is best known for his tenure with Dragon Gate where he is a former Open the Brave Gate Champion.

== Career ==
He had a strong background in Greco-Roman wrestling and debuted on November 3, 2009 for Inoki Genome Federation (IGF). He went to a time limit draw against Akira Jo. He stopped wrestling to focus on college and returned on IGF's December 31, 2013 show in another time limit draw.

He continued wrestling mostly for IGF throughout 2014 and 2015 and made appearances for various promotions starting in 2016. On October 2, 2016, he and Tomohiko Hashimoto, captured Apache Pro's WEW World Tag Team Championship. The team held the titles until December 25, 2016, when they were defeated by Tatsuhito Takaiwa and Tetsuhiro Kuroda. In 2017, he competed in a lethwei match but was defeated. He became a full-time member of DDT Pro-Wrestling in 2018, but resigned on April 30, 2019. Almost immediately after, he started wrestling exclusively for Dragon Gate.

He became a member of Masaaki Mochizuki's unit, Mochizuki Dojo in the summer of 2019, after briefly feuding with Mochizuki. The unit was disbanded in December 2019 with most of its members merging into the Dragon Gate unit.

He captured the Open the Brave Gate Championship on November 3, 2020 by defeating Kaito Ishida.

Okuda made his return to MMA, facing kickboxer Hiroaki Suzuki on October 10, 2021 at Rizin Landmark Vol.1. He lost the bout via TKO in the first round.

Okuda faced Yuta Kubo at Rizin Landmark 4 on November 6, 2022. He lost the fight by TKO stoppage at the end of the first round.

== Championships and accomplishments ==
- Apache Pro-Wrestling Army
  - WEW World Tag Team Championship (1 time) – with Tomohiko Hashimoto
- Dragon Gate
  - Open the Brave Gate Championship (1 time)
- Pro Wrestling Illustrated
  - Ranked No. 302 of the top 500 singles wrestlers in the PWI 500 in 2021

== Mixed martial arts record ==
Professional record breakdown
5 matches	0 wins	5 losses
By knockout	0	3
By submission	0	1
By disqualification	0	1

Res.	Record	Opponent	Method	Event	Date	Round	Time	Location	Notes
Loss	0–5	Yuta Kubo	TKO (elbows and punches)	Rizin Landmark 4	November 6, 2022	1	4:43	Nagoya, Japan	Featherweight debut.
Loss	0–4	Grant Bogdanove	Submission (face crank)	Rizin Trigger 1	November 28, 2021	1	1:07	Kobe, Japan	
Loss	0–3	Hiroaki Suzuki	TKO (knee and punches)	Rizin Landmark Vol.1	October 2, 2021	1	1:42	Tokyo, Japan	
Loss	0–2	Tomoharu Toda	DQ (kick to head of grounded fighter)	Fighting Nexus 5	March 6, 2016	1	N/A	Tokyo, Japan	
Loss	0–1	Yuki Yamamoto	TKO (knee and punches)	Inoki Bom-Ba-Ye 2015	December 31, 2015	1	0:26	Tokyo, Japan	Lightweight debut.
