= Takayuki Mori =

Japanese professional wrestler

Personal information
- Born: September 10, 1976 (age 49) Matsuyama, Ehime, Japan
- Education: Ehime University

Professional wrestling career
- Ring name(s): Anthony W. Mori; Kentaro Mori; Takayuki Mori
- Billed height: 1.71 m (5 ft 7 in)
- Billed weight: 70 kg (154 lb)
- Debut: May 13, 2000
- Retired: December 2, 2010

Takayuki Mori (森 隆行, Mori Takayuki; born October 9, 1976) is a retired Japanese professional wrestler. He is best known for working for Dragon Gate, under the ring name Anthony W. Mori (アンソニー・W・森, Ansonī Daburyū Mori), where he is a one-time Open the Brave Gate Champion, one-time Open the Owarai Gate Champion and two-time Open the Triangle Gate Champion.

== Biography ==
Before entering the Toryumon dojo, Mori was an accomplished scholar, graduating with a law degree from Ehime University.

Mori debuted with the Toryumon T2P class in 2000 under his real name. The following year, he became Kentaro Mori (森Ken太郎, Mori Kentarō), "Barbie's boyfriend", and the year after that, he switched over to his current gimmick of Anthony W. Mori, a royal prince. The "W" stands for White.

Aside from a stint under his real name in 2006, when he became a member of Tozawa-juku for six months, Mori's character has not changed greatly since his debut. In 2002, upon taking on the royal prince character, he formed the Royal Prince Brothers unit with Junya Fukumasa and Takuya Sugawara, who were renamed to – respectively – Phillip J. Fukumasa and Henry III Sugawara and wore royalty inspired outfits. However, the group would go on hiatus at the end of the year when Fukumasa left wrestling and Sugawara returned to Mexico for more training. He would spend 2003 with various alignments, most notably the Italian Connection (Milano Collection A.T. & YOSSINO). His best friend Ryo Saito also betrayed him that year to join Do FIXER.

When Sugawara returned to Japan in 2004, Mori quickly revived the Royal Brothers unit with him, but the unit would not last long, because Sugawara would soon violently turn on him and join heel stable Aagan Iisou. The betrayal greatly hurt Mori, rendering him catatonic for several months. His refusal to fight Sugawara caused him to be subjected to further attacks from him. However, when Mori saw his old friend Ryo Saito getting beaten up by Aagan Iisou, he snapped out of his catatonic state and saved him. He and Ryo reconciled, and he also officially joined the Italian Connection. Mori ended his feud with Sugawara on November 28 by winning a hair vs. hair match against him, but Sugawara managed to avoid getting his hair cut off (Dragon Gate President Takashi Okamura ended up taking the haircut for him), and on December 16, he and the rest of the Italian Connection became the first Open the Triangle Gate Champions.

The Italian Connection would dissolve in 2005 when Milano left the promotion, and some time after, Mori approached Magnum TOKYO with the idea to form Pos.HEARTS. The stable was formed, with Super Shisa and a then-rookie BxB Hulk as the other members. Though Mori was the leader of the stable, the stable's main purpose was to launch BxB Hulk's career. In 2006, Magnum would betray Mori, causing Pos.HEARTS to go on hiatus for a while. He soon became heavily pursued by the cram school stable Tozawa-juku with offers to join them. Mori initially refused all of the offers, but he would slowly come around to the idea, and in July he admitted that he was not enough of a man and thus would join the school to gain polish. He reverted to his real name during his tenure with Tozawa-juku. On occasion, he would wrestle as Anthony, and in December, Pos.HEARTS reunited and captured the Open the Triangle Gate titles from Naruki Doi, Masato Yoshino & Gamma of the Muscle Outlaw'z.

Mori graduated from Tozawa-juku in January 2007, and he continued to focus on Pos.HEARTS. However, the trio lost the titles that month back to Doi, Yoshino & Gamma, and the month after that, they were forced to dissolve Pos.HEARTS after losing another match to them, where he took the fall. He (along with BxB Hulk) would soon join CIMA in his Typhoon stable.

In April 2008, he won the Open the Brave Gate Title from Masato Yoshino, but because he won it due to unwanted outside interference from Yasushi Kanda, he immediately vacated it. He was entered into the subsequent tournament for the vacant title, and he made it to the finals, but he lost to Gamma.

When the Typhoon unit was brought to an end at the end of the year, he began to ally with Super Shisa and Shisa BOY again in 2009, as well as with Masaaki Mochizuki and Don Fujii, and soon started feuding with Cyber Kong. Each one gained victories over the other, both in singles and tag team competition, until they agreed to settle the feud on March 22 in a Mascara contra Caballera match (his hair against Kong's mask). The match initially ended in a no-contest after Real Hazard intruded, and when they went for his hair, Mochizuki and Fujii made the save. The match was restarted, and Cyber Kong won it decisively, so he lost his hair. On April 4, he captured the Open the Owarai Gate Title from Hollywood Stalker Ichikawa. He held onto the title for over a month before losing it to Kikutaro.

At the start of November, Takuya Sugawara started to get involved with Dragon Gate again. Mori immediately began to try to convince him to reform the Royal Brothers with him once more. On November 28, Sugawara and Masaaki Mochizuki tried to recruit him into the Veteran-gun to take on the New Generation (which was odd, because he debuted in the same class as Naruki Doi, a member of the New Generation), and he agreed to join them, but only if Sugawara would agree to reform the Royal Brothers with him once the generation war was over. Sugawara accepted the offer, but mentioned that they were short one member, since Phillip J. Fukumasa was retired. Mori asked for Mochizuki to be the heir to Phillip's throne, and he accepted, becoming Phillip J. Mochizuki. They agreed to team as the new Royal Brothers on the first Buyuden show after the generation war was finished. Mori wrestled his retirement match on December 2, 2010. He remains with Dragon Gate in a backstage role.

== Championships and accomplishments ==
- Dragon Gate

- Open the Brave Gate Championship (1 time)
- Open the Owarai Gate Championship (1 time)
- Open the Triangle Gate Championship (2 times) – with BxB Hulk & Super Shisa (1) and Milano Collection AT & YOSSINO (1)

=== Luchas de Apuestas record ===
Winner (wager)	Loser (wager)	Location	Event	Date	Notes
Takuya Sugawara (hair)	Anthony W. Mori (hair)	Tokyo, Japan	Live event	September 17, 2004	(Note: This was a tag team match, where Sugawara teamed with Shuji Kondo and Mori with Ryo Saito.)
Anthony W. Mori (hair)	Takuya Sugawara (hair)	Tokyo, Japan	Live event	November 28, 2004	
Anthony W. Mori (hair)	Gamma (hair)	Nagoya, Japan	Live event	August 11, 2007	(Note: Tag team Hair vs. Mask match, where Mori teamed with Dragon Kid and Gamma with Kinta Tamaoka.)
Cyber Kong (mask)	Anthony W. Mori (hair)	Tokyo, Japan	Live event	March 22, 2009	
