= Ryoya Tanaka =

Japanese wrestler (born 1999)

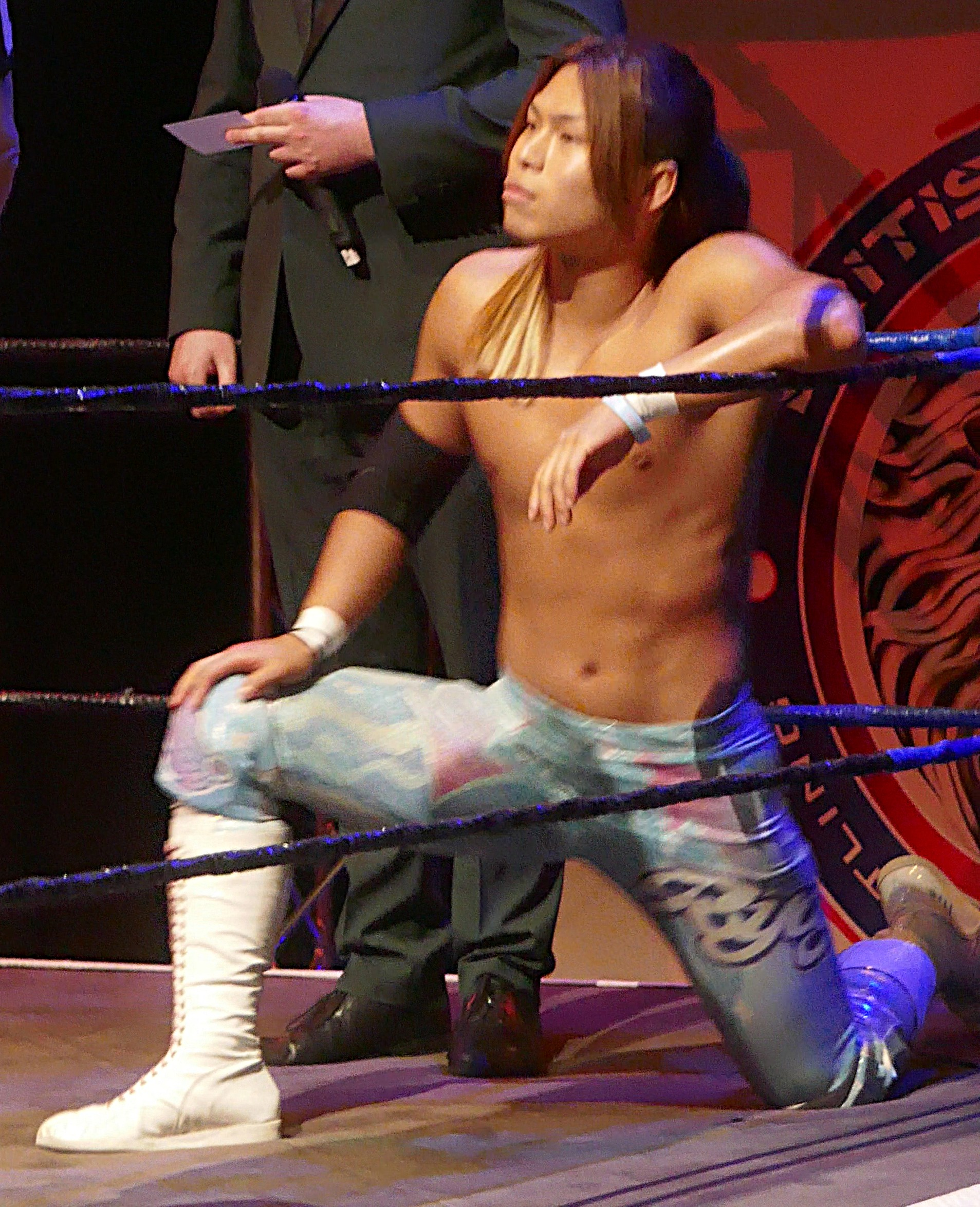
- Tanaka in may 2025

Personal information
- Born: 16 January 1999 (age 27) Amagasaki, Japan

Professional wrestling career
- Ring name: Ryoya Tanaka Orion
- Billed height: 168 cm (5 ft 6 in)
- Billed weight: 70 kg (154 lb)
- Trained by: Billy Ken Kid
- Debut: 2023

Ryoya Tanaka (田中 良弥, Tanaka Ryōya) is a Japanese professional wrestler signed to Dragongate where he is the current Open the Brave Gate Champion in his first reign. He often competes in promotions from the Japanese independent scene.

== Professional wrestling career ==
=== Dragongate (2023–present) ===
Kato made his professional wrestling debut in Dragongate on the seventh night of the DG Hopeful Gate 2023 from May 14, where he fell short to Kagetora in an exhibition bout. During his tenure with the promotion, he was part of the "D'courage" stable. at DG Champion Gate In Osaka 2024 on March 3, he teamed up with stablemates Dragon Dia and Madoka Kikuta to unsuccessfully challenge Z-Brats (Ishin, Kai and Shun Skywalker) for the Open the Triangle Gate Championship. At DG Kobe Pro-Wrestling Festival 2025 on July 13, Tanaka defeated U-T to win the Open the Brave Gate Championship, the first title of his career.

He competed in various signature events of the promotion. In Gate of Destiny, the promotion's grandest annual event, Kato made his first appearance at the 2023 edition where he unsuccessfully challenged Ishin for the Open the Brave Gate Championship. At the 2024 edition of the event, Tanaka unsuccessfully challenged Dragon Dia for the same championship.

=== Japanese independent circuit (2023–present) ===
Kato competes in promotions of the Japanese independent scene as a developmental talent sent by Dragongate. One of these promotions is Ryukyu Dragon Pro Wrestling where he is a former Sou Ryuo Tag Team Champion, titles which he won as "Orion" alongside Chraumi Silver at RDPW Dragon X Dragon 2024 on June 16.

== Championships and accomplishments ==
- Dragongate
  - Open the Brave Gate Championship (1 time)
- Pro Wrestling Illustrated
  - Ranked No. 146 of the top 500 singles wrestlers in the PWI 500 in 2026
- Ryukyu Dragon Pro Wrestling
  - Sou Ryuo Tag Team Championship (1 time) – with Churaumi Saver
