= Naoki Tanizaki =

Japanese wrestler (born 1978)

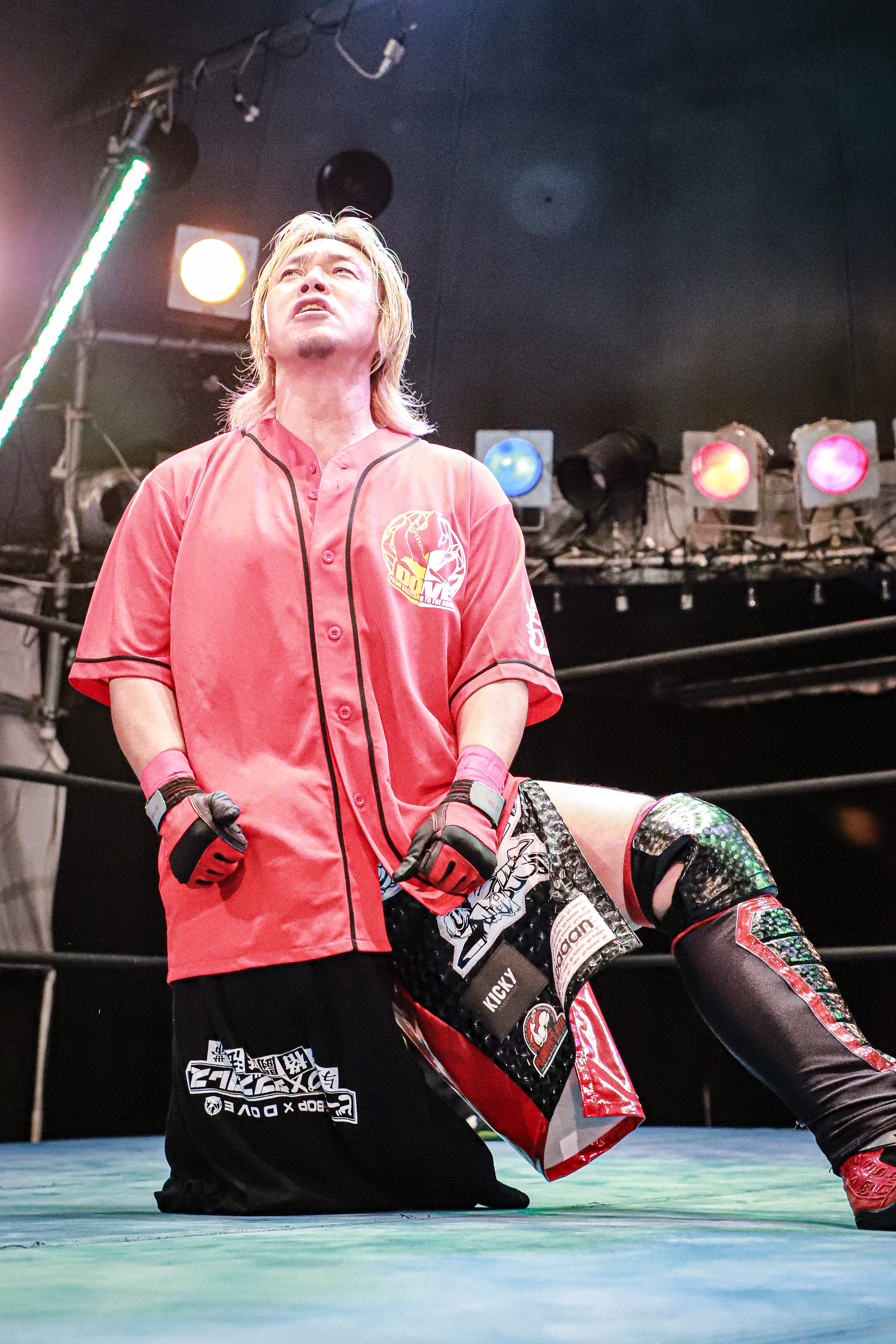
- Tanizaki in July 2023

Personal information
- Born: December 1, 1978 (age 47) Toyonaka-shi, Osaka Prefecture, Japan

Professional wrestling career
- Ring names: Mr. Kyu Kyu "Naoki Tanizaki" Toyonaka Dolphin; Mr. Kyu Kyu Toyonaka Dolphin; Naoki Tanizaki
- Billed height: 1.72 m (5 ft 8 in)
- Billed weight: 78 kg (172 lb)
- Trained by: Último Dragón
- Debut: December 7, 2002

Naoki Tanizaki (谷嵜 直樹, Tanizaki Naoki; ring name: 谷嵜 なおき) (born December 1, 1978) is a Japanese professional wrestler. He is known for his work in Dragon Gate. He previously went under the ring name Mr. Kyu Kyu Naoki Tanizaki Toyonaka Dolphin (Mr.キューキュー“谷嵜なおき”豊中ドルフィン, Mr. Kyū Kyū Tanizaki Naoki Toyonaka Dorufin).

== Professional wrestling career ==
=== Toryumon system and Dragon Gate (2002–2006) ===
Originally from the Toryumon X promotion, Naoki Tanizaki debuted in a Toryumon Mexico show in December 2002. When Toryumon X made their Japanese landing in August 2003, Naoki debuted as a surfer (similar to Genki Horiguchi) defeating Kenichi Hanai. After losing to Horiguchi, he partnered with Horiguchi as the Surfing Brothers for his final two appearances in Toryumon X. The next month, Tanizaki made the jump to Toryumon Japan as a part of El Numero Uno 2004. When Toryumon Japan became, Dragon Gate in July 2005, Tanizaki was the only Toryumon X graduate to fully integrate into Dragon Gate, prior to Kagetora in 2009. Due to his relationship with Horiguchi, appealed to join Magnum Tokyo's Do Fixer stable. Magnum agreed provided that Tanizaki won one match out of a 10 match trial series. Tanizaki lost all 10 matches and was given a five match re-trial series. He lost all of his five matches. Despite losing all of his matches during his trial series, he joined Do Fixer stable and became Shingo Takagi's rival. He was soon overshadowed by Shingo and BxB Hulk and showed signs of breaking into singles competition. He was recruited for Cima's Blood Generation stable and after showing heelish mannerisms, he eventually turned on his Do Fixer stablemates and joined up with Cima in 2006. The night that he joined, Blood Generation split into two separate factions known as the Muscle Outlaw'z and Cima's new version of the Blood Generation. Tanizaki joined up with Muscle Outlaw'z but soon had a losing streak against Jack Evans and any other gaijin wrestler Cima brought in. His contract was then terminated in July and he officially left in December.

=== Independent circuit (2006–2008) ===
Tanizaki quickly joined the El Dorado Wrestling roster, even though he continued to remain a freelance wrestler. He was out injured after his second match with the company, however. He joined up with Shuji Kondo upon returning. Parts of his freelancing included forays into Pro Wrestling ZERO1-MAX, Big Japan Pro Wrestling and Kaientai Dojo. In the latter, he joined the heel stable Omega. In 2008, he resigned from El Dorado.

=== Return to Dragon Gate (2008–2017) ===
Tanizaki once again signed with Dragon Gate six days after announcing he was becoming freelance again, as a result of being sacrificed to the newly arriving Magnitude Kishiwada just like in 2005. He signed an open contract, in which he competes on all Dragon Gate shows but is also free to compete elsewhere. Tozawa-juku offered him membership into their stable, but he ended up joining Naruki Doi, Masato Yoshino, BxB Hulk and m.c.KZ in Doi & Yoshino's new faction WORLD-1.

On December 21, he fought Cyber Kong in a Mask vs. Hair match, which he initially won after interference from Cyber Kongcito backfired. Real Hazard (Kong's stable) came out to protest the result, but Cyber Kong said he would own up to the mask stipulation - except that it would be Kongcito's mask, not his. Kongcito was unmasked, beaten up, and kicked out of Real Hazard. Cyber Kong then demanded a restart, due to Kongcito's intrusion, and Cima came out, appointed the special referee, and agreed to let the match restart, since both Real Hazard and WORLD-1 had intruded in the match. Cyber Kong won, and Tanizaki lost his hair.

On August 30, 2009, he won his first title in his career when he defeated Kagetora in a tournament final to win the vacant Open the Brave Gate Championship. He successfully defended the title six times before dropping it to K-ness on January 11, 2010.

On June 13, 2010, he started showing some heel tendencies during his match against Super Shisa where he used a low blow to set up for his Implant finisher. Later during the main event he almost cost his fellow World-1 teammate Masato Yoshino a chance at becoming the number one contender for Yamato's Open The Dream Gate title by mistakenly hitting him with the Deep Drunkers signature Blue Box nearly costing him the match to Deep Drunkers leader Takuya Sugawara. On June 20, 2010, he teamed up with Naruki Doi and Pac to defeat the Warriors team of Genki Horiguchi, Cima, Gamma to win the Open the Triangle Gate Championship for the first time. During the final moments of the match he once again used a low blow as a set up for his Implant finisher further teasing a heel turn. However, only 4 days later they were beaten in a rematch and lost the titles back to the former champions.

On August 5, 2010, he interfered in a match pitting his World-1 teammates Naruki Doi and Masato Yoshino against the Warriors team of Cima and Gamma assisting them in gaining the victory without there consent and expressed anger towards them since no one from World-1 was in his corner for his dark match. On August 24, 2010, he accidentally cost his team the win against Deep Drunkers after a misfired Protein Powder attack struck Pac leading to their loss, he quickly apologized to his partners after they questioned what was wrong with him lately and told them everything was fine. On August 29, 2010, he competed in a tournament to crown a new Open The Brave Gate Champion after Masato Yoshino vacated the title but fell to his Deep Drunkers rival Kzy in the first round. On September 3, 2010, he along with Naruki Doi and BxB Hulk challenged for the Open The Triangle Gate Championship but fell short after he was pinned following Genki Horiguchi's Backslide From Heaven. The team then argued with one another and agreed to face off in a Three Way Match on October 3.

On September 17, 2010, following another loss, Tanizaki finally snapped as he and his partner BxB Hulk argued over the loss and was stopped by Dr. Muscle who then attacked BxB Hulk and gave him an Implant, he offered a handshake to Tanizaki and was refused. Later on in the main event pitting his World-1 teammates Masato Yoshino and Naruki Doi against K-ness and Susumu Yokosuka for the Open The Twin Gate Championship he attacked both Yoshino and Susumu giving both men an Implant but then laying Yokosuka over Yoshino costing them the titles. He further cemented his betrayal of World-1 by joining up with The Deep Drunkers Stable thus completing his heel turn. On October 3, 2010, he went on to win the Three Way Match between himself, Hulk, and Doi following interference from his new Deep Drunkers teammates as he eliminated both men and went so far as to mock them by saying their diamonds were probably made of glass, a knock on the World-1 logo. On October 13, 2010, the Deep Drunkers were forced to split up, after losing a match against World–1 (BxB Hulk, Masato Yoshino and Naruki Doi), but after the match Doi turned on his partners to form a new stable with Tanizaki, Yasushi Kanda, Kzy and Takuya Sugawara. On October 25 Tanizaki, Kanda and Sugawara defeated Cima, Gamma and Genki Horiguchi to win the Open the Triangle Gate Championship. They would lose the title to Cima, Dragon Kid and Ricochet on December 26, 2010. On January 14, 2011, Team Doi aligned themselves with the Warriors stable, who turned heel in the process. On January 18 the new group was named Blood Warriors. On July 17, Tanizaki attacked Open the Brave Gate Champion and member of rival group Junction Three, Pac, and stole his championship belt. Tanizaki then announced that since Pac was heading home to England for the next month, he would defend the championship in his place. Blood Warriors named the title the "Blood Warriors Authorized Open the Brave Gate Championship" with Tanizaki defending it in matches, where he only needed to score two counts to win them. On September 2, Tanizaki, Kzy and Naruki Doi defeated Gamma, Masato Yoshino and Yamato to win the Open the Triangle Gate Championship. On September 16, the returning Pac defeated Tanizaki to regain possession of the Open the Brave Gate Championship. On January 8, 2012, Tanizaki was sidelined with a shoulder injury. The injury also led to Dragon Gate stripping Blood Warriors of their Open the Triangle Gate Championship on January 19.

Very shortly after Tanizaki was injured, his Blood Warriors stablemate Tomahawk T.T. adapted Tanizaki's moveset, attire, and obtained fake tattoos that were copies of Tanizaki's. Blood Warriors claimed he was the real Tanizaki returning early from injury, but the slight change in spelling of his name (written as 谷崎なおき instead of 谷嵜なおき) was used to indicate that Tomahawk T.T. was an imposter.

On March 1, the new leader of Blood Warriors, Akira Tozawa, changed the stable's name to Mad Blankey. Tanizaki returned on June 30, saving Cima from Mad Blankey. The following day, he joined the Jimmyz stable. On September 23, Tanizaki lost the right to use his name, when he, Genki Horiguchi H.A.Gee.Mee!! and Ryo "Jimmy" Saito unsuccessfully challenged the Mad Blankey trio of Akira Tozawa, BxB Hulk and the fake Naoki Tanizaki for the Open the Triangle Championship. As a result, Tanizaki lost the rights to his name. He attempted to rename himself to Naoki Jimmy, but fake Tanizaki claimed the right to choose Tanizaki's new name. Saying that Tanizaki's whining and crying reminded him of the "kyu kyu" noise a dolphin makes, he renamed Tanizaki to Mr. Kyu Kyu Toyonaka Dolphin.

Dolphin continued to team with the Jimmyz. On December 16, 2012, Dolphin won his first pinfall over the fake Tanizaki, after Cyber Kong, a stablemate of fake Tanizaki's, interfered in the match but inadvertently cost him the match while trying to help him. On January 27, 2013, Dolphin defeated the fake Naoki Tanizaki to regain the right to use his real name, while also earning the right to rename the fake Tanizaki "Mr. Pii Pii Tomakomai Penguin". The rivalry culminated on February 11, when the Jimmyz defeated Mad Blankey in a five-on-five elimination tag team match, as a result of which Penguin was exiled from Dragon Gate. After the match, Tanizaki shook hands with Penguin and offered to team with him in the future. Tanizaki then also fought off Mad Blankey, when they turned on Penguin. Tanizaki then began working as "Mr. Kyu Kyu Naoki Tanizaki Toyonaka Dolphin" and formed a partnership with Penguin, with the two losing to Akira Tozawa and BxB Hulk in their first match together on February 15.

On October 8, 2015, Tanizaki betrayed the Jimmyz after his match with Jimmy K-Ness J.K.S. and joined VerserK, in the process ending the Mr. Kyu Kyu Toyonaka Dolphin gimmick and reverting to his real name. Over the course of 2017, Tanizaki was quietly removed from Dragon Gates official website before announcing his contract with the promotion expired in October.

== Factions ==
- Do Fixer (2004–2006)
- Blood Generation (2006)
- Muscle Outlaw'z (2006)
- Sukiyaki (El Dorado) (2007–2008)
- World-1 (2008–2010)
- Deep Drunkers (2010)
- Blood Warriors (2011–2012)
- Jimmyz (2012–2015)
- VerserK (2015–2017)

== Championships and accomplishments ==
- Dotonbori Pro Wrestling
  - WDW Six Man Tag Team Championship (1 time) – with Kohei Kinoshita and Shoichi Uchida
- DDT Pro-Wrestling
  - UWA World Trios Championship (1 time) – with Ryota Nakatsu and Akiyori Takizawa (1)
- Dove Pro Wrestling
  - Dove Pro Heavyweight Championship (1 time)
  - Dove Pro Tag Team Championship (1 time, current) – with Ryota Nakatsu
- Colega Pro Wrestling
  - King Of Colega Championship (1 time, inaugural)
  - King Of Colega Title Battle Royal (2021)
- Dragon Gate

- Open the Brave Gate Championship (1 time)
- Open the Triangle Gate Championship (6 times) – with Naruki Doi and Pac (1), Yasushi Kanda and Takuya Sugawara (1), Kzy and Naruki Doi (1), Genki Horiguchi H.A.Gee.Mee!! and Ryo "Jimmy" Saito (1), Jimmy Susumu and Ryo "Jimmy" Saito (1), and Jimmy Kanda and Jimmy Susumu (1)
- Blood Warriors Authorized Open the Brave Gate Championship (1 time)^{1}

- Pro-Wrestling Basara
  - Union Max Championship (1 time)
- Professional Wrestling Just Tap Out
  - Independent World Junior Heavyweight Championship (1 time)

^{1}Championship not recognized by Dragon Gate.

=== Luchas de Apuestas record ===
Winner (wager)	Loser (wager)	Location	Event	Date	Notes
Cyber Kong (mask)	Naoki Tanizaki (hair)	Kobe, Japan	Live event	December 21, 2008	
