= Ryo Saito =

Japanese professional wrestler (born 1979)

Personal information
- Born: August 15, 1979 (age 47) Yamagata-shi, Yamagata, Japan

Professional wrestling career
- Ring name: Ryo Saito
- Billed height: 1.75 m (5 ft 9 in)
- Billed weight: 82 kg (181 lb)
- Trained by: Último Dragón; Skayde
- Debut: May 15, 1999

Ryo Saito (斎藤 了, Saitō Ryō) (born August 15, 1979) is a Japanese professional wrestling personality and semi-retired professional wrestler primarily working in Dragongate, where he is their general manager. He is a former member of numerous stables within Dragongate as both a heel and a face, including Jimmyz (where he adopted "Jimmy" as a nickname), Real Hazard and Blood WARRIORS; he served as the second leader of Do FIXER (replacing Magnum TOKYO) from 2004 until its dissolution in February 2007. His name is sometimes abbreviated as SaiRyo, so as not to confuse him with Yoshiyuki Saito, who primarily wrestles as Super Shisa.

== Professional wrestling career ==
=== Toryumon (1999–2004) ===
Ryo Saito debuted in 1999 as a fourth term student. He fought in that year's Young Dragons Cup, but lost in the finals to the newly-heel Yasushi Kanda.

In 2000, he divided his time between Japan and Mexico, and in Japan he adopted the gimmick of a bicycling enthusiast, wearing a professional bicycler's outfit, helmet, and glasses and coming to the ring on a bicycle. He became something of a jobber, losing nearly 20 opening matches in a row to Kenichiro Arai. He also participated in that year's Young Dragons Cup, and made it to the finals again, but lost to the man who became his greatest foil, Milano Collection A.T. When he returned to Japan, his bicycle was stolen by Sumo "Dandy" Fuji 2000, starting up a feud between them that led into 2001. Saito eventually managed to win his bicycle back, and he and the now-renamed Big Fuji started teaming on and off as the Bicycle Brothers for the next couple of years.

2001 was also the year when Saito finally broke out of his small role and achieved some championship success. On August 14, he teamed with Magnum TOKYO and Dragon Kid to win the UWA World Trios Championship from CIMA, SUWA, and Big Fuji of Crazy MAX, and on September 30, he beat Susumu Mochizuki for the NWA World Welterweight Title. His momentum came to a halt in late 2001 when the T2P class arrived in Japan, and he spent the next few months losing to Milano Collection A.T. and feuding with the newly-heel Genki Horiguchi. It was during this time that he formed a close friendship with T2P student Anthony W. Mori.

In 2002, Saito began to make a heel turn. He, along with Dragon Kid, aligned with Darkness Dragon after he lost a mask vs. mask match to Dragon Kid on September 8 and was booted out of M2K, joining the Do Fixer unit that Darkness created. On October 28, Magnum Tokyo sealed M2K after Yasushi Kanda retired, and later that night he revealed that he and the other members were the real Do Fixer, along with the newly renamed K-ness. K-ness had been sent into the home army as a spy to cause problems within it, and it worked in that Saito was not welcomed back into the home army. Because of this, he decided to actively pursue gaining membership into Do Fixer. He abandoned his bicyclist character, smashing up his bike with a chair, but he could not pass leader Magnum Tokyo's dance test and was denied entrance. That all changed in December when he debuted his own personal and bizarre dance called the "SaiRyo Dance", and Magnum Tokyo, pleased with it, allowed him to join should he pass one more test, which was a match on December 20 where he and the other Do Fixer members faced Masaaki Mochizuki, Kenichiro Arai, Raimu Mishima, Takamichi Iwasa, and Anthony W. Mori in an elimination match. Towards the end, Magnum eliminated himself, leaving just Ryo and his friend Mori as the final two. Saito proved his allegiance to Do Fixer by betraying Mori, smacking him with a black box and winning the match. 2003 went by quite uneventfully for Saito. He acted as the main H-A-G-E call cheerleader for stablemate Genki Horiguchi, and he was derailed by injuries.

=== Dragon Gate (2004–present) ===
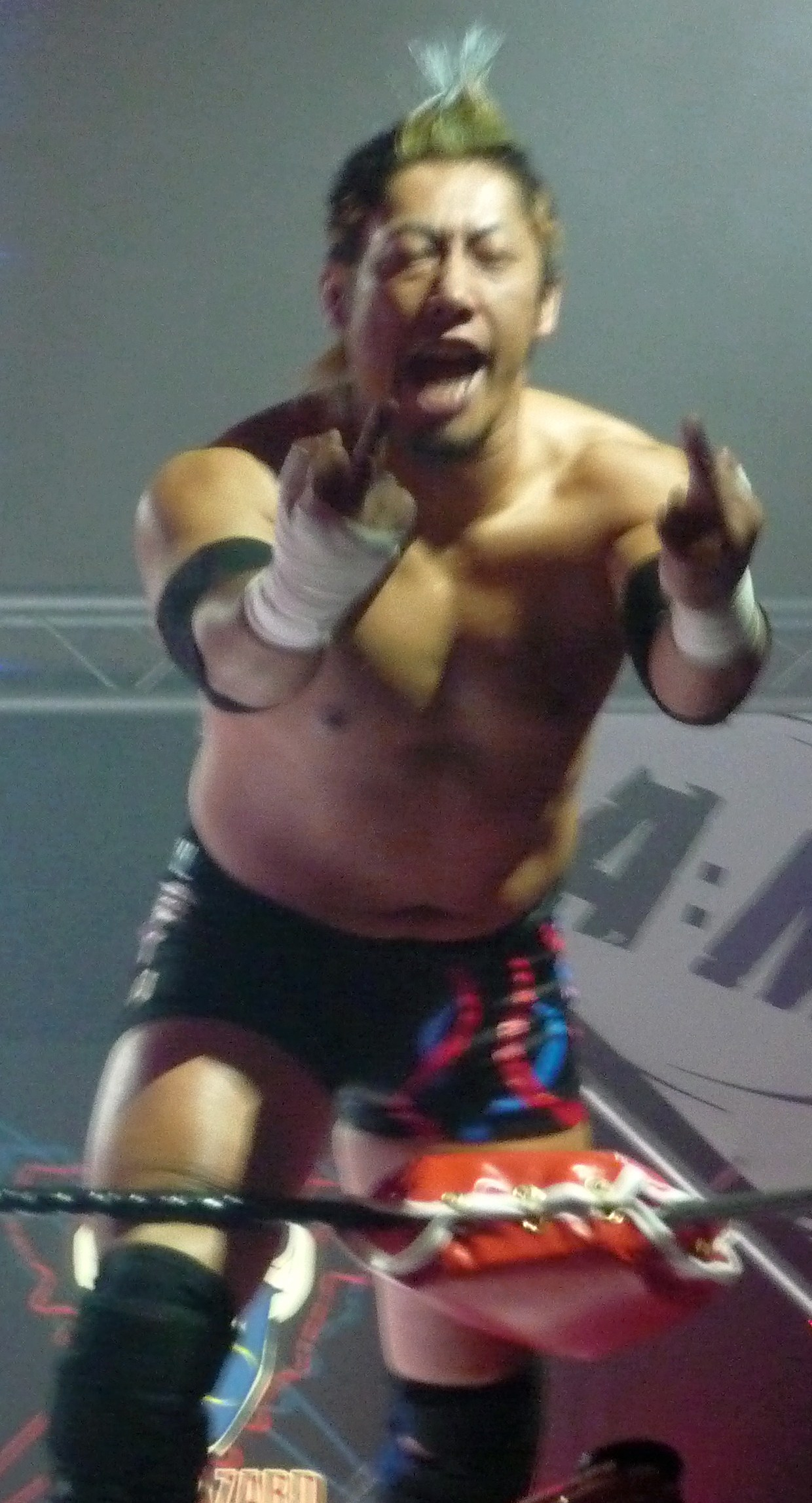
Saito in Oxford, November 2009

2004 was also another injury-plagued year, but he began to turn face again, aiding his old friend Mori in his feud with Takuya Sugawara. He helped him overcome the shock of Sugawara's betrayal, and when Mori lost a hair vs. hair match, Saito took the haircut for him.

2005 brought about a major resurgence in his career. He opened the first show of the year on January 9 by pinning CIMA in a six-man tag match. Then, when he appealed for a shot at the Open the Dream Gate title, held by Masaaki Mochizuki, he was given a January 14 singles match with Milano Collection A.T. as a hurdle, and he defeated Milano after four years of losses to him. He failed to win the Open the Dream Gate title in the February 6 match. He spent the remainder of the year garnering high-profile victories, as well as two Open the Triangle Gate Championship reigns with Genki Horiguchi and Dragon Kid, and when Magnum began to move down a different path with his Renaissance project, he named Saito the new leader of Do Fixer. Saito then won a feud with CIMA, and in December he won the inaugural King of Gate Tournament. His momentum continued right into February 2006, when he beat Magnitude Kishiwada to win the Open the Dream Gate Championship and became the ace of the promotion.

His quick ascent to the top was not entirely accepted by the fans, and thus his career went downhill after his title victory. He dropped the championship to Susumu Yokosuka in his first defense, and though he had a third Open the Triangle Gate title reign with Genki and Dragon Kid, things were quiet for him for the rest of the year. He made it to the finals of that year's King of Gate Tournament again, but lost to Masaaki Mochizuki.

In February 2007, Genki Horiguchi betrayed Do Fixer to join the Muscle Outlaw'z, so Ryo decided to end Do Fixer activity and follow the only other remaining member Dragon Kid into CIMA's Typhoon stable. In Typhoon, he reunited with Susumu Yokosuka to form the RyoSuka team. Despite achieving some success in the tag ranks, most notably winning the WAR I-J Heavyweight Tag Team Championship in July from Jado and Gedo and two more reigns as Open the Triangle Gate champion with CIMA and Susumu, Ryo continued to slide further in rank.

In 2008, Ryo began to regain rank in the promotion. He took offense to CIMA putting down the Open the Brave Gate title after he challenged for it, causing some strife within Typhoon. It resulted in Ryo challenging CIMA for the Open the Dream Gate title on April 27, and though Ryo lost, their issues were reconciled afterwards. On May 5, Ryo and Susumu achieved further success with their team when they won the Open the Twin Gate titles from Kenichiro Arai and Taku Iwasa of Tozawa-juku. They dropped the championship to inaugural champions Speed Muscle (Naruki Doi and Masato Yoshino) on September 26.

On December 28, he was without a unit after he, Dragon Kid, and Susumu Yokosuka lost a Unit Split survival three-way six-man tag team match to teams from WORLD-1 and Real Hazard, ending Typhoon. He continued to team with Susumu, and also made attempts to form his own unit. On February 15, 2009, he ended up joining a unit instead, turning heel and aligning with Real Hazard after turning on Susumu during an attempt on the Open the Twin Gate titles held by YAMATO and Cyber Kong.

Upon joining Real Hazard he reformed his tag team with Genki Horiguchi, and they won the Open the Twin Gate Championship on May 5, 2009, in a three-way match, which included Real Hazard stablemates Kenichiro Arai and Yasushi Kanda. On June 26, when YAMATO defected from Real Hazard, he assumed the leadership role in the stable. His title reign with Horiguchi ended on September 17, when they lost the belts to Shingo Takagi and YAMATO. On December 3, Susumu Yokosuka turned heel and joined Real Hazard, and they reformed their team, but their reunion plans were quickly derailed when Saito sustained a ruptured Achilles tendon, sidelining him. On February 27, 2010, Genki Horiguchi joined up with the Warriors stable after leaving Real Hazard two weeks earlier, and as a condition of him joining, Saito was brought out of Real Hazard and into Warriors.

Saito turned heel on January 14, 2011, along with the rest of Warriors, when they attacked Masato Yoshino and World-1, and joined forces with Naruki Doi's group. On January 18 the new group was named Blood Warriors. On February 6, 2011, Saito and his Blood Warriors stablemate Genki Horiguchi defeated Don Fujii and Masaaki Mochizuki to win the Open the Twin Gate Championship. They lost the title to rival group Junction Three representatives Dragon Kid and PAC on June 19, 2011. On February 9, 2012, new Blood Warriors leader Akira Tozawa kicked Saito and Horiguchi out of the group. On March 3, after Saito teamed with Genki Horiuchi and Yasushi Kanda to win the vacant Open the Triangle Gate Championship, he renamed himself Ryo "Jimmy" Saito and formed the Jimmyz stable with H-A-Gee-Mee, Jimmy KAGETORA, Jimmy Kanda and Jimmy Susumu. The Jimmyz lost the Open the Triangle Gate Championship to World-1 International (Masato Yoshino, Naruki Doi and Pac) on May 6.

== Championships and accomplishments ==
- Dragon Gate
  - I-J Heavyweight Tag Team Championship (1 time) – with Susumu Yokosuka
  - Open the Dream Gate Championship (1 time)
  - Open the Owarai Gate Championship (2 times)
  - Open the Triangle Gate Championship (11 times) – with Dragon Kid and Genki Horiguchi (3), Susumu Yokosuka and CIMA (2), Genki Horiguchi H.A.Gee.Mee!! and Jimmy Kanda (3), Genki Horiguchi H.A.Gee.Mee!! and Mr. Kyu Kyu Toyonaka Dolphin (1), Jimmy Susumu and Mr. Kyu Kyu Naoki Tanizaki Toyonaka Dolphin (1), and Genki Horiguchi H.A.Gee.Mee!! and Jimmy Susumu (1)
  - Open the Twin Gate Championship (3 times) – with Susumu Yokosuka (1) and Genki Horiguchi (2)
  - King of Gate (2005)
- International Wrestling Revolution Group
  - Copa Higher Power (1998) - with Último Dragón, Magnum Tokyo, Shiima Nobunaga, Judo Suwa, Sumo Fujii & Lyguila
- Pro Wrestling Illustrated
  - PWI ranked him #170 of the top 500 singles wrestlers in the PWI 500 in 2012
- Toryumon Japan
  - NWA World Welterweight Championship (1 time)
  - UWA World Trios Championship (2 times) – with Magnum Tokyo and Dragon Kid (1) and Susumu Yokosuka and Genki Horiguchi (1)
- Westside Xtreme Wrestling
  - Golden Pineapple Tournament (2007) – with Matt Sydal
- Wrestling Observer Newsletter
  - Match of the Year (2006) with Genki Horiguchi and Dragon Kid vs. CIMA, Naruki Doi and Masato Yoshino (ROH Supercard of Honor, March 31)
