= Yūki Ōno =

Japanese professional wrestler

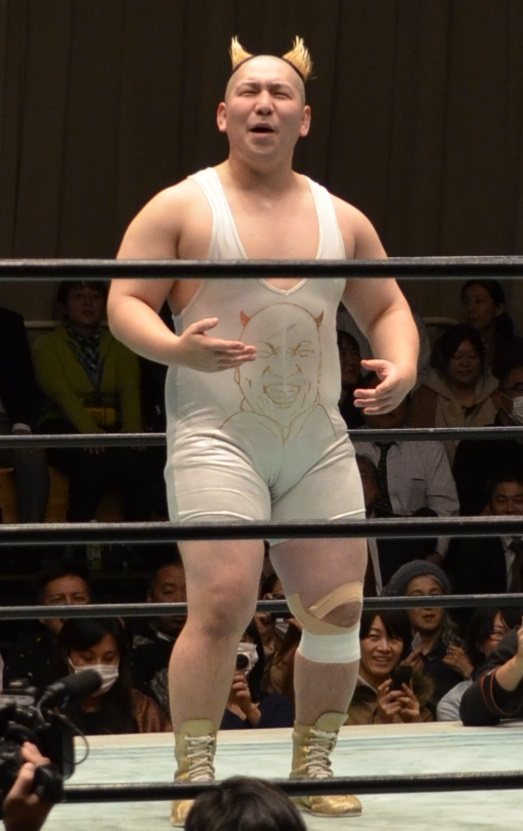
- December 2013

Personal information
- Born: October 4, 1985 (age 40) Hakodate, Hokkaidō

Professional wrestling career
- Ring name(s): Cyber Kongcito; Katsuo; Ultra Mango; Yūki Ōno
- Billed height: 1.65 m (5 ft 5 in)
- Billed weight: 100 kg (220 lb)
- Trained by: Yoshiyuki Saito
- Debut: October 5, 2005

Yūki Ōno (大野 勇樹, Ōno Yūki; born April 10, 1985 in Hakodate, Hokkaidō, Japan) is a Japanese wrestler who most notably worked for Dragon Gate.

== Biography ==
=== Dragon Gate ===
He is the 4th graduate from the Dragon Gate dojo. He debuted in October 2005 against Don Fujii. After losing the match he was renamed Katsuo by Fujii. The name came from the comic strip Sazae-san, and his resemblance to the character Katsuo Isono.

He joined Tozawa-juku in 2006, assuming the role of their drum bearer. He reverted to his real name with the Tozawa-juku faction, but he continued to wrestle in Dragon Gate NEX as Katsuo. Like his stablemate Akira Tozawa, he became known as a troublemaker backstage, and didn't seem to catch on with fans.

In 2007, he started to gain weight, and eventually reached 102 kilograms. He became a charming fat man, wearing silver tights and boots instead of the gakuran pants worn by the rest of the Tozawa-juku unit, and it resulted in a big increase of his popularity. When it surpassed Tozawa's, it caused Tozawa to begin a similar weight gain program. They began to team together as the Metabolic Brothers within Tozawa-juku, but the team found no success. Ono was derailed by injuries, and the gimmick, despite having worked well for Ono previously, did not get over with the fans. On July 11, 2008, the team came to an end when Tozawa announced his intentions to go on a diet. He asked Ono to lose weight as well, but Ono refused and vowed to balloon up to 170 kilograms.

On August 26, Yuki Ono asked for – and was granted – a release from his contract with Dragon Gate. However, it was all a ruse, for he immediately returned the next day as the heel "Cyber Kongcito", a miniature version of Cyber Kong, and joined Real Hazard. His identity was technically secret, but his voice and weight gave him away. The new gimmick did not improve his standing in the federation, and he was sparingly used. On December 21, he interfered in a Mask vs. Hair match between Cyber Kong and Naoki Tanizaki, and his attempt to aid Cyber Kong backfired, resulting in him being pinned. Real Hazard came out to protest the result, but Cyber Kong said he would own up to the mask stipulation – except that it would be Kongcito's mask, not his. Kongcito was unmasked, beaten up, and kicked out of the group.

His last appearance in wrestling was on the December 22, 2008 NEX card. Wrestling under his old Katsuo gimmick, he lost to m.c.KZ. This makes him the first wrestler trained at the Dragon Gate dojo to leave the promotion.

=== Post Dragon Gate ===
As of October 2011, Ono is working in Okinawa Pro Wrestling under the gimmick Ultra Mango.

== Personal life ==
On April 26, 2026, Katsuo announced his marriage to a Yuu.

== Championships and accomplishments ==
- Okinawa Pro Wrestling
  - MWF World Tag Team Championship (1 time) – with Kijimuna
