= Tag League =

Tag League may refer to:

- G1 Tag League, a professional wrestling round-robin tag team tournament held annually by New Japan Pro Wrestling
- Global Tag League, a professional wrestling round-robin tag team tournament held annually by Pro Wrestling NOAH
- Summer Adventure Tag League, a professional wrestling tag team tournament held annually by Dragon Gate
- Tag League the Best, a professional wrestling tag team tournament originally held by All Japan Women's Pro-Wrestling and currently by JWP Joshi Puroresu
