= Yasushi Tsujimoto =

Japanese professional wrestler

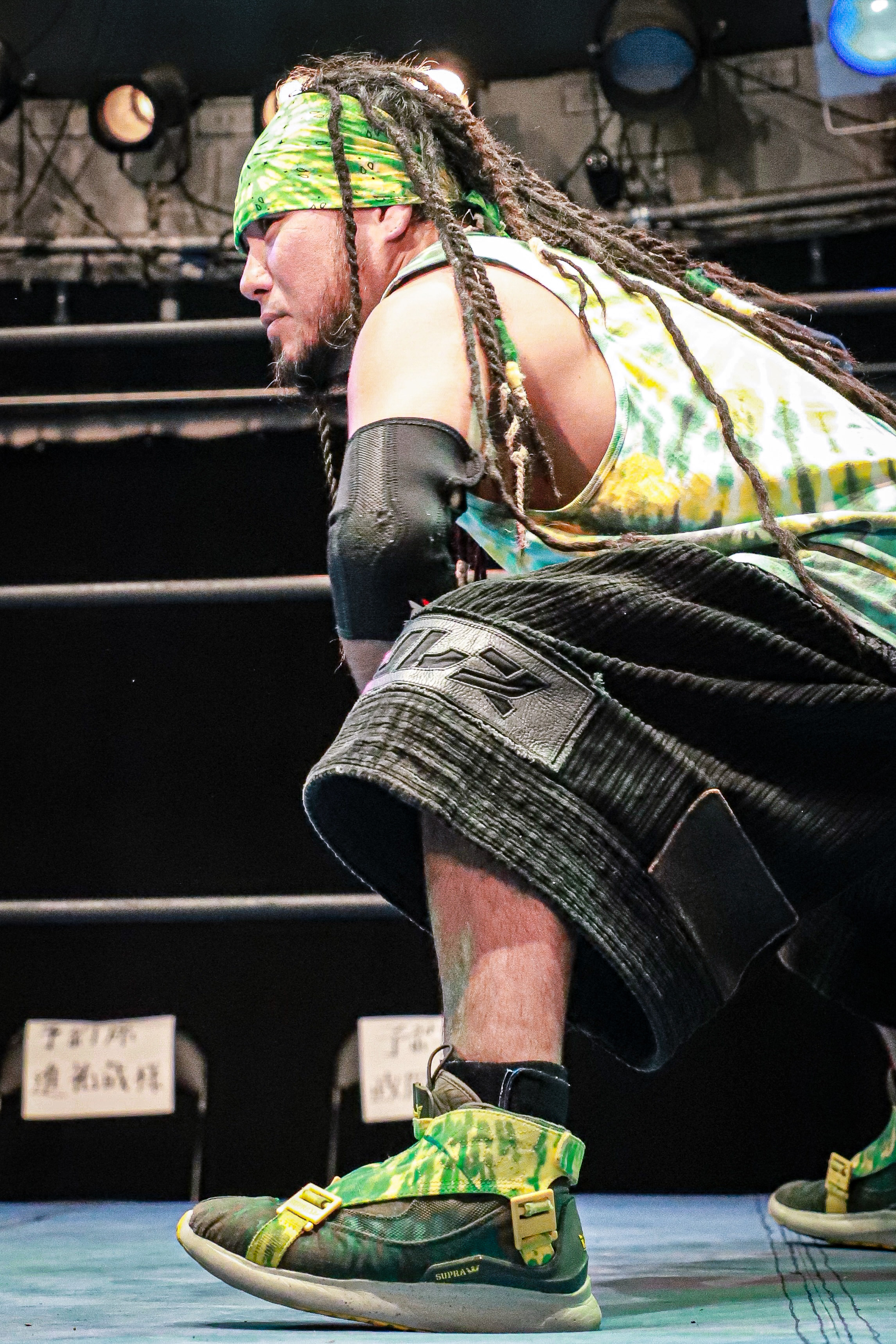
- Yasshi in July 2023

Personal information
- Born: January 26, 1982 (age 44)

Professional wrestling career
- Ring name(s): "brother" Tom Yankun "brother" Yasshi "brother" Yassini "samurai" Yasshi; Stevie "brother" Tsujimoto "strong" Yasshi; Yassini; Yasushi Tsujimoto
- Billed height: 1.73 m (5 ft 8 in)
- Billed weight: 80 kg (176 lb)
- Trained by: Último Dragón; Jorge Rivera
- Debut: 2000

Yasushi Tsujimoto (辻本 恭史, Tsujimoto Yasushi), better known by his ringname "brother" Yasshi (stylised as "brother"YASSHI), is a Japanese professional wrestler, known for his appearances in El Dorado Wrestling, Dragon Gate, and All Japan Pro Wrestling. He is currently working for Pro Wrestling Zero1. He was an amateur wrestler before becoming a pro wrestler.

== Career ==
=== Toryumon – Japan ===
Tsujimoto debuted in Toryumon Japan as part of the T2P class as Stevie "brother" Tsujimoto. He was ranked second, roughly tied with Masato Yoshino, but far behind Milano Collection AT. Both he and Yoshino would join Milano's faction The Italian Connection, renaming to Yassini and Yossino respectively. Tsujimoto did not like his new name, and after arguing with Milano, settled on "brother Yassini".

The Italian Connection began showing a divide, as Milano and Yossino were face oriented, whereas Yassini and fellow ItaCon stablemates Condotti Shuji, Bakery Yagi and Berlinetta Boxer were all heels. Yassini and Shuji would split from the ItaCon when they attacked Milano and Yossino with blue boxes. They renamed to brother Yasshi and Shuji Kondo respectively, and as of 2008 have remained together. Kondo and Yasshi brought Toru Owashi and Shogo Takagi (the unmasked Berlinetta Boxer) into their group, and renamed to Hagure Gundam.

=== Dragon Gate – Aagan Iisou ===
Veteran Dragon Gate wrestler Masaaki Mochizuki joined Hagure Gundam as the leader. The stable renamed to Aagan Iisou, which means roughly Villains all wear the same colors. They added Takuya Sugawara into the mix shortly after. Kondo, Yasshi and Sugawara formed a regular three man tag team. Kondo and Mochizuki began to argue over who was the ace of the stable, and Aagan sided with Kondo, kicking Mochi out of the group.

All five members of Aagan Iisou – Kondo, Yasshi, Sugawara, Owashi and Takagi – were fired from Dragon Gate on December 31, 2004, for controversial and mostly unexplained reasons.

=== All Japan Pro Wrestling ===
After Kondo and Yasshi were fired from Dragon Gate, they surfaced in AJPW as part of DG alumni TARU's stable Voodoo Murders.

=== Dragondoor/El Dorado ===
Yasshi and Kondo reprised their alliance in the short lived Dragondoor promotion, as well as their three-man tag team with Takuya Sugawara. Although Toru Owashi and Shogo Takagi were both in the promotion, a full reunion of Aagan Iisou never happened.

In El Dorado, Yasshi split from Kondo for the first time since their early days in the Italian Connection. Yasshi returned to the wrestling and Llave style he used in the early days of his career, and formed a stable of his own called the Nanking Fucking Wrestling Team alongside high school wrestling teammates Masaki Okimoto and Yuji Hino. It did not last long as he made few attempts to expand it, and after losing a match to Kondo in which the loser disbanded his faction, Yasshi reformed his alliance with Kondo.

Yasshi retired in February 2009.

=== Diamond Ring ===
On December 9, 2012, Yasshi made a special appearance in Kensuke Sasaki's Diamond Ring. On February 11, 2013, he, Taru, Kazunari Murakami, Kengo Nishimura, Kento Miyahara and Taishi Takizawa reformed the Voodoo Murders, with Yasshi positioned as the leader of the group.

=== Return to Dragon Gate ===
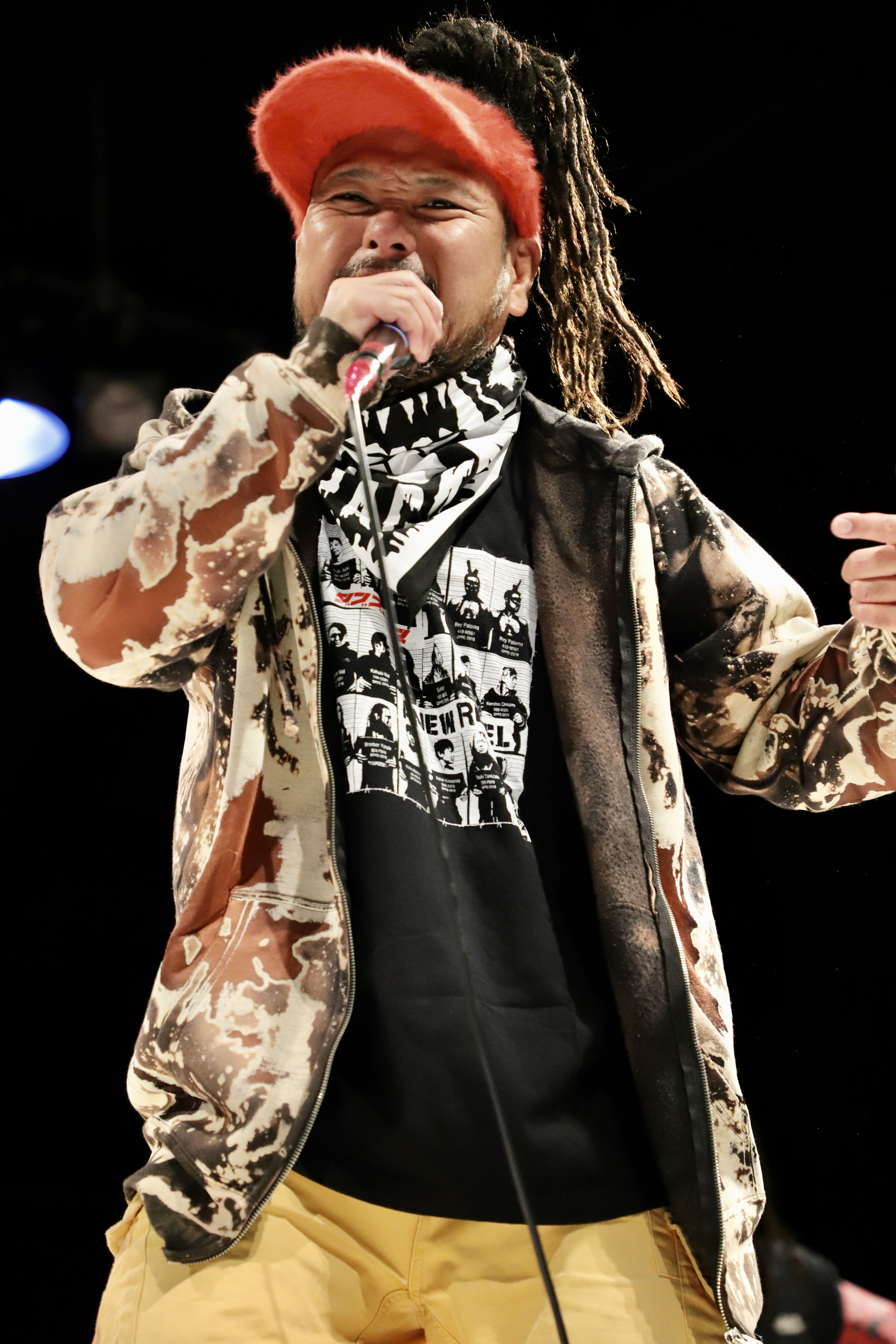
Yasshi in November 2020

On February 4, 2016, Yasshi returned to Dragon Gate, 11 years after his controversial firing, and reunited with his former Italian Connection stablemate Masato Yoshino. On May 11, Yasshi returned once again and joined Verserk.

== Championships and accomplishments ==
- All Japan Pro Wrestling
  - All Asia Tag Team Championship (1 time) – with Shuji Kondo
  - January 3 Korakuen Hall Junior Heavyweight Battle Royal (2006, 2007, 2009)
  - Aquamarine Cup Tag Tournament (2005) – with Shuji Kondo
- Big Japan Pro Wrestling
  - UWA World Tag Team Championship (1 time) – with Kohei Kinoshita
- Pro Wrestling Zero1
  - NWA International Lightweight Tag Team Championship (2 times) – with Takuya Sugawara
- Tenryu Project
  - Tenryu Project World 6-Man Tag Team Championship (2 times) — with Minoru Suzuki and Kengo (1) and Don Fujii and Kenichiro Arai (1)
- Tokyo Sports
  - Tag Team of the Year (2006) – with Taru, Suwama and Shuji Kondo
- Toryumon Japan
  - UWA World Trios Championship (2 times) – with Milano Collection A.T. and Yossino (1), and Condotti Shuji and Toru Owashi (1) (Note: The UWA closed in 1995, since then various UWA titles had been used by promotions in Mexico and Japan, this title was promoted by Toryumon Japan at the time Taru won it.)
  - Rey de Parejas (2003) – with Dotti Shuji

== Mixed martial arts record ==
Professional record breakdown
1 match	0 wins	1 loss
By knockout	0	0
By submission	0	1
By decision	0	0

Res.	Record	Opponent	Method	Event	Date	Round	Time	Location	Notes
Loss	0–1	(Japan) Takasuke Kume	Submission (rear naked choke)	HEAT 4	August 11, 2007	2	3:07	Tokyo, Japan	
