= Yamato (wrestler) =

Japanese professional wrestler

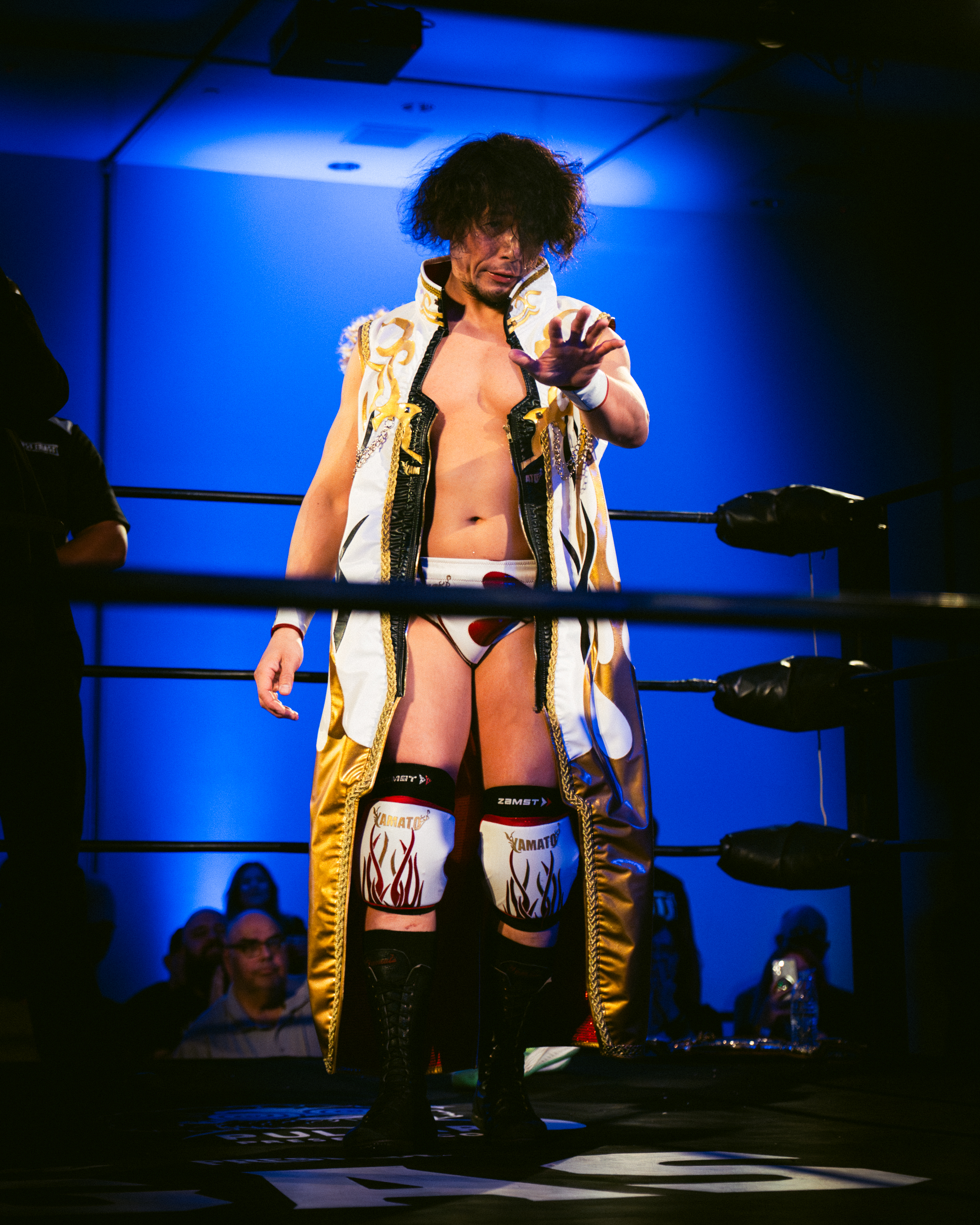
- Yamato in April 2025

Personal information
- Born: Masato Onodera; September 10, 1981 (age 44) Ichinoseki, Iwate, Japan

Professional wrestling career
- Ring name(s): Yamato; Yamato Onodera; Masato Onodera
- Billed height: 1.72 m (5 ft 8 in)
- Billed weight: 82 kg (181 lb)
- Trained by: Yasushi Kanda
- Debut: July 29, 2006

Masato Onodera (小野寺 正人, Onodera Masato; born September 10, 1981), better known by the ring name Yamato (stylized in all capital letters), is a Japanese professional wrestler and former mixed martial artist currently signed to Dragongate, where he is a record six-time Open the Dream Gate Champion.

== Professional wrestling career ==
=== Dragon Gate (2006–present) ===
The 5th graduate of the Dragon Gate dojo, Onodera had previous mixed martial arts experience competing under his real name in Pancrase and was recruited into Final M2K directly after his debut. Yasushi Kanda gave him his "Gekokujoh" character, and inherited a lot of the Gekokujoh-era moves that Kanda had used during his own career. He later chose to leave Final M2K so he could grow along his own path, which was one of the reasons for the M2K breakup.

He won the first Nex-1 tournament, which earned him the right to travel to the U.S. His stay was brief, lasting under three months. He returned in May, aligning with his generation peers Shingo Takagi, BxB Hulk and Cyber Kong in New Hazard, dropping the Gekokujoh lineage completely and renaming himself Yamato.

He appeared in Ring of Honor's All Star Extravaganza III and Super Card of Honor II. He defeated Pelle Primeau and was beaten by Claudio Castagnoli during a U.S. tour.

On April 17, 2008, Yamato betrayed New Hazard and sided with the Muscle Outlaw'z after he attacked his partner Naoki Tanizaki in a tag match against Gamma and Genki Horiguchi. However, the betrayal was a ruse, for on May 14, Takagi and Kong betrayed Hulk before the trio were scheduled to defend their Open the Triangle Gate Championship against Yamato, Gamma and Horiguchi. New Hazard was ended, and Takagi and Kong joined up with Yamato and company to form the new super-heel group Real Hazard. Then, he, Gamma, and Takagi won the newly-vacant Open the Triangle Gate titles in an impromptu match against Hulk, Naruki Doi and Masato Yoshino. Their title reign lasted until June 28, when they were defeated by Kenichiro Arai, Taku Iwasa and Shinobu. However, he would win them back from them on July 12, along with Yasushi Kanda and Gamma, and the trio would lose the titles to Masaaki Mochizuki, Don Fujii and Magnitude Kishiwada on September 28. But, Yamato would not be without a championship for long, for a week later, he teamed with Cyber Kong to defeat Naruki Doi and Masato Yoshino for the Open the Twin Gate Championship.

When Gamma and Yasushi Kanda began to have serious problems with each other, he helped organize a match between them where the loser would be kicked out of Real Hazard. Even though Kanda lost, Gamma ended up being the one ousted from the unit, after Kenichiro Arai joined the group's ranks and assisted them in beating down Gamma. Yamato then took over Gamma's role as leader.

On March 1, he and Cyber Kong lost the Open the Twin Gate titles to Susumu Yokosuka and Gamma after stablemate Kagetora interfered and turned on them. He then began to provoke BxB Hulk, and offered him to join Real Hazard under his Black Hulk persona. Hulk responded by randomly attacking members of Real Hazard as Black Hulk, dominating each attack until April 15, when Real Hazard got the better of him and laid him out. Yamato then challenged him to a match, and said he did not care whether Hulk fought him as Black Hulk or his normal self. In the match, held on May 5, saw BxB Hulk as Black Hulk beat him by referee stoppage.

Shortly after this, a lot of friendly fire began to occur between Real Hazard in their matches. On May 23, Yamato told the group not to interfere in his match the next day against Shingo Takagi. However, Kanda still hits Takagi with a blue box and then tossed the box to Yamato. A disappointed Yamato refused to use the blue box and even gave Takagi a free shot on him due to the interference. In the end, Yamato lost the match. The refusal of help from his stable caused Genki Horiguchi to question his reasoning. He then went to New Japan Pro-Wrestling to compete in their annual Best of the Super Juniors tournament, hoping tensions would've cooled down by the time he returned to Dragon Gate. Though he was eliminated from contention in the round-robin portion of the tournament, only winning two of six matches, his two wins came against junior heavyweight greats Jyushin Thunder Liger and eventual winner Koji Kanemoto. When he returned to Dragon Gate, he continually refused to team with his Real Hazard stablemates, and finally quit the group altogether on June 26.

He joined up with Kamikaze and re-formed his team with Shingo Takagi, and they made a challenge for Ryo Saito and Genki Horiguchi's Open the Twin Gate Titles on July 19. They failed to capture the titles due to him being blinded by a protein powder attack from Kenichiro Arai. However, they would gain another title shot in August, after winning the annual Summer Adventure Tag League Tournament, and they would win the titles a month later. They would lose the title to Cima and Gamma on December 27.

On March 22, 2010, Yamato defeated Naruki Doi via Gallaria to become the 11th Open the Dream Gate Champion at Compilation Gate 2010 in Tokyo. Following this match, Yamato enjoyed three successful title defenses against Susumu Yokosuka, Shingo Takagi and Masaaki Mochizuki. On July 11, 2010, Yamato lost the Open the Dream Gate Championship to Masato Yoshino at Kobe World 2010. On May 13, 2011, Takagi disbanded Kamikaze and the following day both him and Yamato joined Masaaki Mochizuki's new stable, Junction Three, to battle Cima's Blood Warriors. On June 18, Yamato, Gamma and Yoshino defeated the Blood Warriors team of Cima, Naruki Doi and BxB Hulk to win the vacant Open the Triangle Gate Championship. They would go on to lose the title to the Blood Warriors team of Kzy, Naoki Tanisaki and Naruki Doi on September 2. On October 16, Yamato lost his hair to Cyber Kong in a six-way steel cage Hair vs. Hair match. On February 9, 2012, Junction Three was forced to disband, after losing a fourteen-man elimination tag team match to Blood Warriors. On April 19, 2012, Yamato, alongside Shingo Takagi joined with Dragon Gate NEX Member Chihiro Tominaga, and the debuting Super Shenlong III and formed -akatsuki-. On July 22, 2012, Yamato and Shingo Takagi defeated Jimmy Kagetora and Jimmy Susumu to become the 22nd Open the Twin Gate Champions. They lost the title to Don Fujii and Masaaki Mochizuki on September 23, 2012. Yamato and Takagi won the title for their third time together on May 5, 2013, by defeating BxB Hulk and Uhaa Nation. They lost the title to Akira Tozawa and BxB Hulk on June 15, when Yamato turned on Takagi to join Tozawa's and Hulk's Mad Blankey stable. On August 1, Yamato became the new leader of Mad Blankey, when the stable turned on Akira Tozawa. On August 23, Yamato defeated Shingo Takagi to win the Open the Dream Gate Championship for the second time. On October 6, Yamato became a double champion, when he, BxB Hulk and Cyber Kong defeated Takagi, Akira Tozawa and Masato Yoshino to win the vacant Open the Triangle Gate Championship. However, just four days later, he lost the Open the Dream Gate Championship to Yoshino. On December 5, Mad Blankey also lost the Open the Triangle Gate Championship to Millennials (Eita, Flamita and T-Hawk). On December 8, the Mad Blankey duo of Yamato and Naruki Doi defeated the Millennials to win the Open the Twin Gate Championship. They lost the title to Akira Tozawa and Shingo Takagi on December 22. On May 5, 2014, Yamato won the Open the Dream Gate Championship for a record-tying third time by defeating Ricochet. He lost the title to former Mad Blankey stablemate BxB Hulk on July 20. On August 16, 2015, Mad Blankey was forced to disband after losing to Jimmyz in a five-on-five elimination tag team match, after being betrayed by K-ness. On September 23, Yamato formed a new stable named VerserK with Cyber Kong, Kotoka, Mondai Ryu, Naruki Doi and Shingo Takagi. On May 6, Yamato and Doi would lose the Twin Gate Championships to Big R Shimizu and T-Hawk, ending their record-breaking 267-day reign with record breaking 9 defenses. On May 5, Yamato was betrayed by his VerserK stablemates and later aligned with BxB Hulk, Kzy, and Yosuke♥Santa Maria, turning face in the process. The four ended up forming a new unit, which was named Tribe Vanguard on May 28, 2016. On June 12, Yamato defeated Big R Shimizu to win the annual King of Gate tournament. On July 24, Yamato defeated Shingo Takagi to become Dream Gate Champion for the fourth time. On September 22 at "Dangerous Gate", Yamato defeated Akira Tozawa marking his first defense. Yamato defeated Naruki Doi December 25 at "Final Gate" for his second defense. February 2 at "Truth Gate", Yamato defeated BxB Hulk marking his third defense. Yamato defeated Cyber Kong on March 5 at "Champion Gate", for his fourth successful defense. He defeated Shingo Takagi, Cyber Kong, BxB Hulk and Naruki Doi in a cage match on May 5, 2017, at Dead Or Alive, marking his fifth defense. Afterwards, Cyber Kong was forced to unmask. On September 18, 2017, at Dangerous Gate, Yamato lost the Dream Gate Championship to Masaaki Mochizuki in his seventh defense.

=== Dragon Gate USA (2009–2012) ===
On Enter the Dragon, Dragon Gate USA's first ever pay-per-view which first aired on September 4, 2009, Yamato defeated BxB Hulk in the opener. On the very same show, Yamato cemented his villainous status when he and Gran Akuma engaged in a post-match attack on Mike Quackenbush and Jigsaw, starting a feud with the Chikara wrestlers. This led to Yamato and Akuma facing Quackenbush and Jigsaw in a losing effort at Untouchable. At Freedom Fight, Yamato entered the tournament to crown the first Open the Freedom Gate Champion. He defeated Davey Richards to qualify for the four-way elimination match tournament finals against Hulk, Akuma and Cima, but Hulk gained revenge when by last eliminated Yamato to become champion. At Fearless, Yamato teamed with Shingo Takagi in an elimination match against Naruki Doi and Masato Yoshino and The Young Bucks. The duo would survive seeing the Bucks eliminated but fell to Doi and Yoshino in defeat. After the conclusion of Fearless' main-event, Yamato ran out with Takagi, Akuma and Richards to beat down both Hulk and Dragon Kid, but the attackers were thwarted by the Chikara wrestlers. At Mercury Rising, Yamato successfully defended his newly won Open the Dream Gate championship against Susumu Yokosuka in his first defense, while forming the Kamikaze USA stable with Takagi and Jon Moxley. At Uprising, Akira Tozawa and Gran Akuma were added to the Kamikaze USA stable, while Yamato teamed again with Takagi to defeat the team of Cima and Dragon Kid. Kamikaze USA would also attack Quackenbush, Jigsaw, Yoshino and Hulk after their matches, leading to Quackenbush challenging Yamato to a match between Kamikaze USA and the Chikara wrestlers. The match took place at Enter The Dragon 2010, which saw Yamato, Tozawa, Moxley and Akuma, representing Kamikaze USA, being defeated by Yoshino, Quackenbush, Jigsaw and Hallowicked, ending the feud between Kamikaze USA and the Chikara wrestlers. At Untouchable 2010, Yamato was defeated by WWE wrestler Bryan Danielson.

At United: NYC in January 2011, Yamato defeated nemesis BxB Hulk to win the Open the Freedom Gate Championship. At Mercury Rising 2011, Austin Aries challenged Yamato for his title by putting his own career on the line. Yamato defeated Aries, who would later renege on his promise to leave the company. At Open the United Gate 2011, Yamato defeated his former Kamikaze USA stable-mate Akira Tozawa to retain his title. By June, Yamato had joined the Junction Three stable in Japan to feud with heels Blood Warriors after the dissolution of Kamikaze and its American version, Kamikaze USA, which cemented Yamato's face status. At Fearless 2011, Yamato would join forces with Tozawa to challenge for the Open the United Gate Championship from tag team champions (and Junction Three stable-mates) Masato Yoshino and Pac, but Pac pinned Tozawa to ensure the champions retained their titles. At Enter the Dragon 2011, Yamato defeated his stable-mate Pac to retain his Open the Freedom Gate championship in his fourth successful defense. (Yamato's third successful defense of his title was against Yasushi Kanda in Japan in April 2011) At Untouchable 2011, Cima, Yamato's longtime rival and the leader of the Blood Warriors' stable, challenged Yamato for his Open the Freedom Gate championship based on Cima's pin on Yamato in a fatal-four-way non-title match earlier that year at Uprising 2011. Yamato managed to beat Cima in his fifth successful defense of his title. At Revolt!, Yamato defeated BxB Hulk, who was now a Blood Warriors member, in DGUSA's first no-rope no-DQ match, which was also a non-title match. At Bushido 2011, Yamato equalled BxB Hulk's number of successful title defenses with six by defeating Chuck Taylor of Ronin. At Freedom Fight 2011 in November, Yamato lost the Open the Freedom Gate Championship to Johnny Gargano of Ronin. After Freedom Fight 2011, Yamato took an eight month hiatus from Dragon Gate USA. He returned to the promotion in July 2012, for two shows, the annual Untouchable and Enter the Dragon events. In his return match at Untouchable, Yamato defeated Ricochet. The following night at Enter the Dragon, Yamato was defeated in a surprise upset by Jon Davis. This was Yamato's final match with the promotion.

== Championships and accomplishments ==
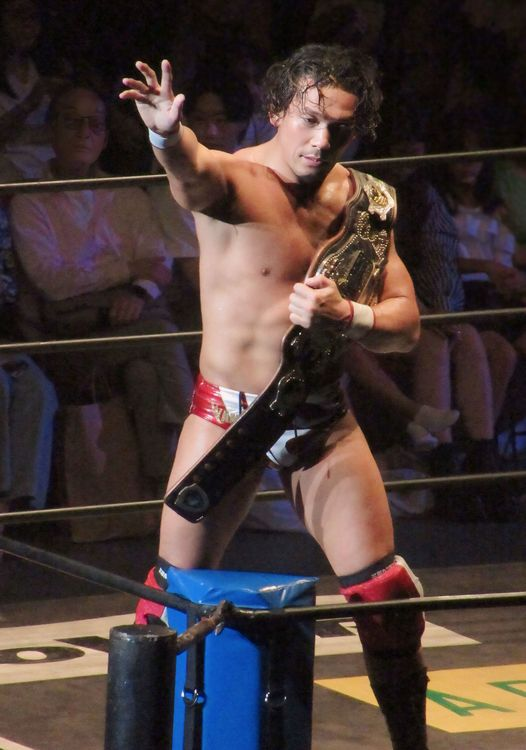
In Dragon Gate, Yamato is a record six-time Open the Brave Gate Champion.

- Dragon Gate
  - Open the Dream Gate Championship (6 times)
  - Open the Brave Gate Championship (1 times)
  - Open the Triangle Gate Championship (6 times) – with Gamma and Shingo Takagi (1), Yasushi Kanda and Gamma (1), Gamma and Masato Yoshino (1), BxB Hulk and Cyber Kong (1), BxB Hulk and Kzy (1) and Dragon Kid and Punch Tominaga (1)
  - Open the Twin Gate Championship (10 times) – with Cyber Kong (2), Shingo Takagi (3), Naruki Doi (2), BxB Hulk (2) and Kai (1)
  - King of Gate (2016)
  - Summer Adventure Tag League (2009) – with Shingo Takagi
  - Dragon Gate Nex-1 (2007)
- Dragon Gate USA
  - Open the Freedom Gate Championship (1 time)
- Pro Wrestling Freedoms
  - King of Freedom World Tag Team Championship (1 time) – with Takashi Sasaki
- Pro Wrestling Illustrated
  - PWI ranked him #47 of the top 500 singles wrestlers in the PWI 500 in 2017
- Tokyo Sports
  - Outstanding Performance Award (2017)

=== Luchas de Apuestas record ===
Winner (wager)	Loser (wager)	Location	Event	Date	Notes
Cyber Kong (mask)	Yamato (hair)	Osaka, Japan	Gate of Destiny	October 16, 2011	(Note: This was a six-way steel cage match, also involving Akira Tozawa, BxB Hulk, Kagetora and Shingo Takagi.)
Yamato (hair)	Kotoka (hair)	Nagoya, Japan	Dead or Alive 2016	May 5, 2016	(Note: This was a six-way steel cage match, also involving Shingo Takagi, Naruki Doi, Naoki Tanizaki and Cyber Kong.)
Yamato (Open the Dream Gate Championship)	Cyber Kong (mask)	Nagoya, Japan	Dead or Alive 2017	May 5, 2017	(Note: This was a five-way steel cage match, also involving BxB Hulk, Naruki Doi and Shingo Takagi, who wagered their hairs.)

== Mixed martial arts record ==
Professional record breakdown
2 matches	0 wins	2 losses
By knockout	0	0
By submission	0	0
By decision	0	2

Res.	Record	Opponent	Method	Event	Date	Round	Time	Location	Notes
Loss	0-2	(Japan) Kazuya Hirose	Decision (unanimous)	Pancrase Brave 9	October 12, 2004	2	5:00	Tokyo, Japan	
Loss	0-1	(Japan) Motokazu Kobayashi	KO (punch)	Pancrase Brave 5	March 28, 2004	2	0:08	Tokyo, Japan	
