= Kagetora (wrestler) =

Japanese professional wrestler

Fumiyuki Hashimoto
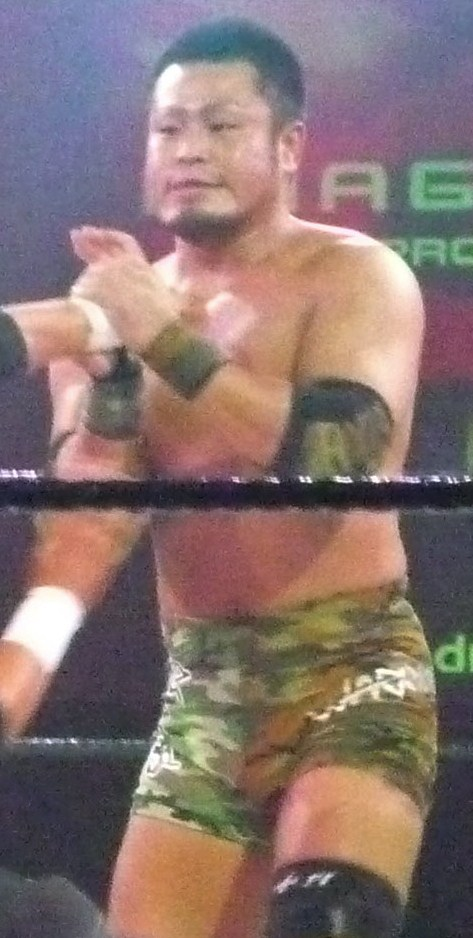
- KAGETORA in 2009

Personal information
- Born: April 21, 1982 (age 44) Tokyo, Japan

Professional wrestling career
- Ring name(s): Kagetora; SUWAcito; Monster Kamen Black; Como Leopardo; Yellow Devil Spider; Jimmy Kagetora
- Billed height: 1.70 m (5 ft 7 in)
- Billed weight: 81 kg (179 lb)
- Trained by: Skayde; Último Dragón
- Debut: May 11, 2002

Fumiyuki Hashimoto (橋本 史之, Hashimoto Fumiyuki) (born April 21, 1982), known by his ring name Kagetora (formerly stylized in all capitals), is a Japanese professional wrestler who works for Dragon Gate. He wrestles in independent wrestling leagues all around Japan and has wrestled in the United States for Chikara and Pro Wrestling Guerrilla. He has wrestled many famous wrestlers including Jinsei Shinzaki.

== Career ==
=== Toryumon (2002–2004) ===
Hashimoto was part of Mini Crazy MAX as SUWAcito early in his career with Takuya Sugi (Mini CIMA) and Masaki Okimoto (Small Dandy Fuji). They were little versions of the Japanese wrestlers CIMA, Suwa and Don Fujii.

=== Michinoku Pro Wrestling (2004–2009) ===
Hashimoto started competing in Michinoku Pro Wrestling in 2005 under the new name of Kagetora, based on Uesugi Kagetora. He initially wore a menpō mask during his matches, but later dropped it. After a tag team tenure with Shanao, Kagetora turned on him and became a heel. He joined Gamma's faction STONED and, after Gamma departed from Michinoku Pro, Kagetora became the leader of the stable. He won the Tohoku Junior Heavyweight Championship on March 19, 2006 but vacated the championship after the match so it could be decided in a tournament.

He turned face again after he was kicked from STONED in El Dorado Wrestling. In 2007, Kagetora and Rasse beat Shu and Kei Sato for the Tohoku Tag Team Championship and, during their title reign, they won the Osaka Pro Wrestling Tag Team Championship, becoming dual champions.

=== Dragondoor and El Dorado Wrestling (2006–2007) ===
After Kagetora became the leader of STONED, the stable started appearing in Dragondoor, where they clashed with dominant stable Aagan Iisou, led by Shuji Kondo. As the promotion closed after a few events, Kagetora moved his independent ventures to Pro Wrestling Zero1, where he found himself teaming up with a member of Aagan Iisou, Takuya Sugawara, who had been recruited for STONED by Gamma.

When Dragondoor was reopened as El Dorado Wrestling, Kagetora started wrestling regularly there under the modified name of KAGETORA, in all caps. Under his command, STONED started a feud against Aagan Iisou over which team would recruit Sugawara, as he was now a member of both factions at the same time, and there waa friction between all three parties. Ultimately, Sugawara chose STONED, but he and the Brahman Brothers turned on KAGETORA and expelled him, renaming the group HELL DEMONS.

Afterwards, KAGETORA, ironically, allied with another ex-member of Aagan Iisou, Toru Owashi, as part of the latter's Animal Planets faction. He challenged Kota Ibushi for the Independent World Junior Heavyweight Championship, but lost the match. He started teaming with Ibushi and they won the UWA World Tag Team Championship, but later vacated the titles.

=== Dragon Gate (2008–present) ===
On December 19, 2008, KAGETORA debuted in Dragon Gate, after it was announced that El Dorado would be closing, intruding after the opening match. He openly declared war on Dragon Gate, attacking m.c.KZ and criticizing fellow former El Dorado wrestler Naoki Tanisaki for abandoning the company months prior. He stated that he himself had abandoned Dragon Gate in 2004, but was now back to wreak havoc.

However, Toryumon veteran K-ness reminded him that it was Dragon Gate who had abandoned KAGETORA and the rest of Toryumon X, not the other way around. K-ness stated that he was happy that some Toryumon X wrestlers, such as El Blazer and Shinjitsu Nohashi, were returning, but not KAGETORA, dismissing him and referring to him by his dojo boy name, "Hashimoto-kun". This led to the announcement of KAGETORA's first two Dragon Gate matches, against m.c.KZ and then K-ness. He then joined up with the Real Hazard stable.

He fought in the one-night Battle of Tokyo Tournament on January 25, 2009, where he beat K-ness in the opening round and then went on to win the tournament, beating Akira Tozawa in the finals. The victory earned him an Open the Brave Gate title shot against Masato Yoshino a few weeks later, but he failed to win. Kenichiro Arai started verbally abusing him for the loss, which continued right up until March 1. On that day, he had had enough: while YAMATO & Cyber Kong were defending their Open the Twin Gate Championship against Susumu Yokosuka & Gamma, he interfered and cost his stablemates the titles. He then left Real Hazard and joined Yokosuka, Gamma, and the returning CIMA in their WARRIORS-5 stable.

On April 15, he captured his first title in Dragon Gate, winning the Open the Triangle Gate titles with CIMA & Gamma. In August, he made another attempt at the Brave Gate by participating in a tournament for the vacant title and made it to the finals, although he lost to Naoki Tanizaki.

When Susumu Yokosuka left WARRIORS-5 for Real Hazard on December 3, KAGETORA began to distance himself from the remainder of the unit over the next few weeks, and then went missing. When he went missing, a new Dr. Muscle appeared in Real Hazard. When Dragon Kid left KAMIKAZE for WARRIORS-5 on January 11, 2010, he broke his silence the next day, posting a blog where he questioned why Kid was allowed into the stable, and hinted at crashing the January 15th show, since he had no match scheduled for that day. He didn't show up, but the day after, he revealed himself to be the one under the Dr. Muscle mask, and re-joined Real Hazard.

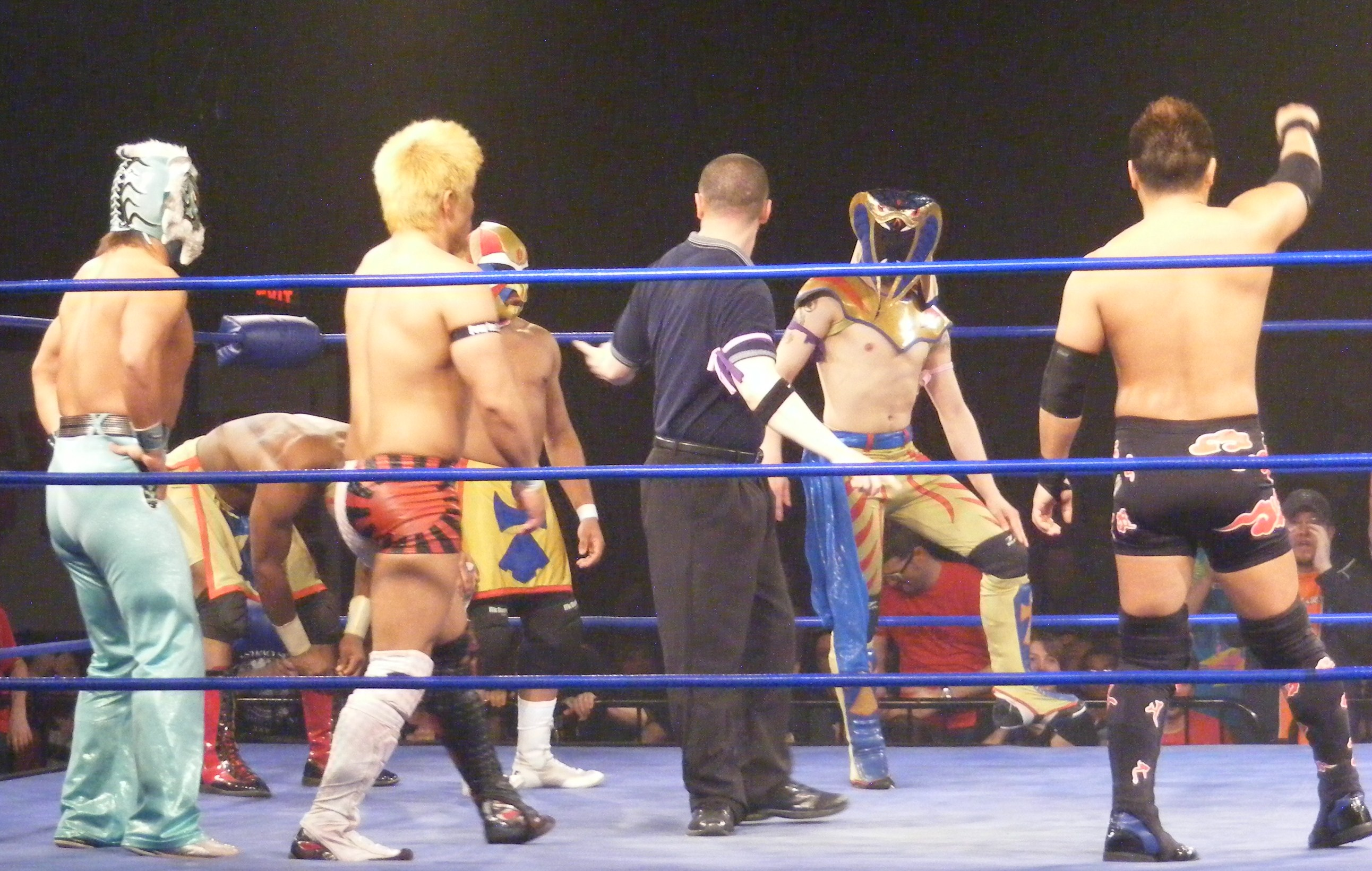
KAGETORA, (far right) along with Akira Tozawa and Super Shisa represent Dragon Gate in the 2011 King of Trios tournament, where they faced the Osirian Portal in the quarter-finals.

However, he openly stated his distrust of everyone in the stable, except for Takuya Sugawara, and very quickly began to regret joining them. Then, on February 7, he oddly went to Akira Tozawa for advice, asking him if he made the right decision in rejoining Real Hazard, or if he should have stayed in the WARRIORS-5 stable. Tozawa simply replied that it was his path, so he had to find his own answer. Things got worse for KAGETORA three days later, when he accidentally cost Sugawara a shot at becoming the next challenger for the Open the Dream Gate Title. This set up a match for the following day between himself and stablemate Kzy (formerly m.c.KZ), where the loser would be kicked out of Real Hazard. He also sought advice from Tozawa again, wondering if his upcoming trip to Germany would go wrong, just like how leaving WARRIORS-5 and joining Real Hazard went wrong, but neither could come up with an answer. The next day, Kzy defeated him, expelling him from Real Hazard. Yasushi Kanda and Kenichiro Arai started to attack him afterwards, but Tozawa came to his rescue. He tried to console KAGETORA, but KAGETORA told him he wanted to be alone and ran off. After the main event match concluded, CIMA called him out. He came to the ring and apologized for deserting WARRIORS-5, and then tried to get some advice from him, prompting Tozawa to come back out and attempt to assert his newfound role as KAGETORA's mentor. As a result, a match was made for February 27, with CIMA, Gamma & Dragon Kid of Warriors-5 facing Tozawa, YAMATO & Shingo Takagi of KAMIKAZE, where the winning team would get KAGETORA. During the match, KAGETORA was hit by an errant cane attack from Gamma, and took the cane away from Gamma when he attempted to cheat again. The finish of the match occurred when KAGETORA accidentally hit Gamma with his cane, leading to Tozawa pinning Gamma for KAMIKAZE's win. KAGETORA thus joined KAMIKAZE, promising his new stablemates that he would do his best.

On April 15, 2011, KAGETORA represented Team Dragon Gate in the 2011 King of Trios tournament along with Akira Tozawa and Super Shisa. In the first round of the tournament, Team Dragon Gate defeated the Spectral Envoy (UltraMantis Black, Hallowicked and Frightmare). The following day, Team Dragon Gate was eliminated from the tournament in the quarter-final stage by The Osirian Portal (Amasis, Hieracon and Ophidian). On April 17, the final day of the tournament, KAGETORA and Shisa took part in a gauntlet tag match and were the final team to enter, but were defeated by Atsushi Kotoge and Daisuke Harada.

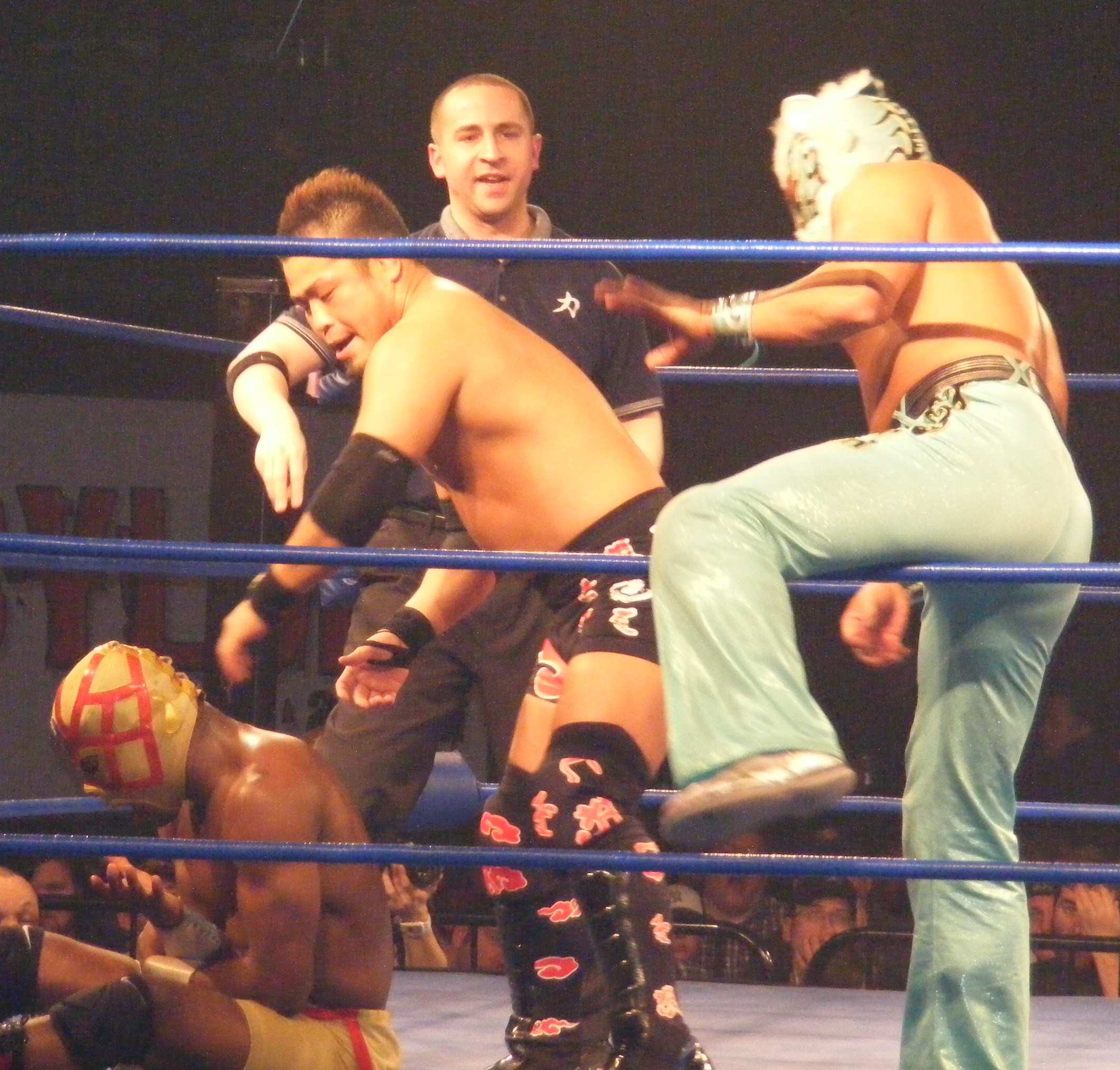
KAGETORA and Super Shisa attack Amasis.

On May 13, 2011, Takagi disbanded KAMIKAZE, after which KAGETORA followed him and YAMATO to Masaaki Mochizuki's new stable, Junction Three. On December 1, KAGETORA and Susumu Yokosuka failed to capture the Open the Twin Gate Championship in a match against the Blood Warriors team of Akira Tozawa and BxB Hulk and, as a result, were forced to change their ring names to Jimmy KAGETORA and Jimmy Susumu, respectively. On February 9, 2012, Junction Three was forced to disband, after losing a fourteen-man elimination tag team match to Blood Warriors. On March 3, KAGETORA formed the Jimmyz stable with H-A-Gee-Mee, Jimmy Kanda, Ryo "Jimmy" Saito and Jimmy Susumu. The following day, KAGETORA and Jimmy Susumu defeated Akira Tozawa and BxB Hulk to win the Open the Twin Gate Championship. They lost the title to BxB Hulk and "Naoki Tanisaki" on June 10, but regained them on June 17 in a 3-way elimination tag team match, which also included MadoGiwa Windows members K-ness & Kenichiro Arai. They would lose the Twin Gate belts to -akatsuki- members Shingo Takagi and YAMATO at the Kobe Pro-Wrestling PPV on July 22, 2012.

On June 19, 2016, Kagetora and Susumu defeated T-Hawk and Big R Shimizu to capture their third Twin Gate Championship. They would lose the titles to CIMA and Dragon Kid on November 3. On March 20, 2017, Jimmy Kagetora defeated El Lindaman in the finals of a tournament to win the vacant Open the Brave Gate Championship. He made his first successful defense on May 5, 2017 at Dead Or Alive, against Takehiro Yamamura.

== Championships and accomplishments ==
- Dragon Gate
  - Open the Triangle Gate Championship (3 times) – with CIMA & Gamma (1), Genki Horiguchi H.A.Gee.Mee!! and Jimmy Susumu (1), and BxB Hulk and Susumu Yokosuka (1)
  - Open the Twin Gate Championship (4 times, current) – with Jimmy Susumu
  - Open the Brave Gate Championship (2 times)
  - Battle of Tokyo Tournament (2009)
  - Summer Adventure Tag League (2014) - with Jimmy Susumu
- El Dorado Wrestling
  - UWA World Tag Team Championship (1 time) - with Kota Ibushi
- Michinoku Pro Wrestling
  - Tohoku Junior Heavyweight Championship (1 time)
  - Tohoku Tag Team Championship (2 times) - with Rasse (1) and Sugi (1)
  - Iron Man Tournament (2005)
  - Futaritabi Tag Team League (2005) - with Shanao
  - Futaritabi Tag Team League (2007) - with Rasse
  - M-12 Battle Royal (2006) with Yoshitsune
- Osaka Pro Wrestling
  - Osaka Pro Wrestling Tag Team Championship (1 time) - with Rasse
- Pro Wrestling Illustrated
  - Ranked No. 230 of the top 500 singles wrestlers in the PWI 500 in 2017
- Toryumon X
  - Yamaha Cup Tag Tournament (2004) - with Mini CIMA
- Pro Wrestling Zero1
  - NWA International Lightweight Tag Team Championship (1 time) - with Jimmy Susumu
