= BxB Hulk =

Japanese professional wrestler

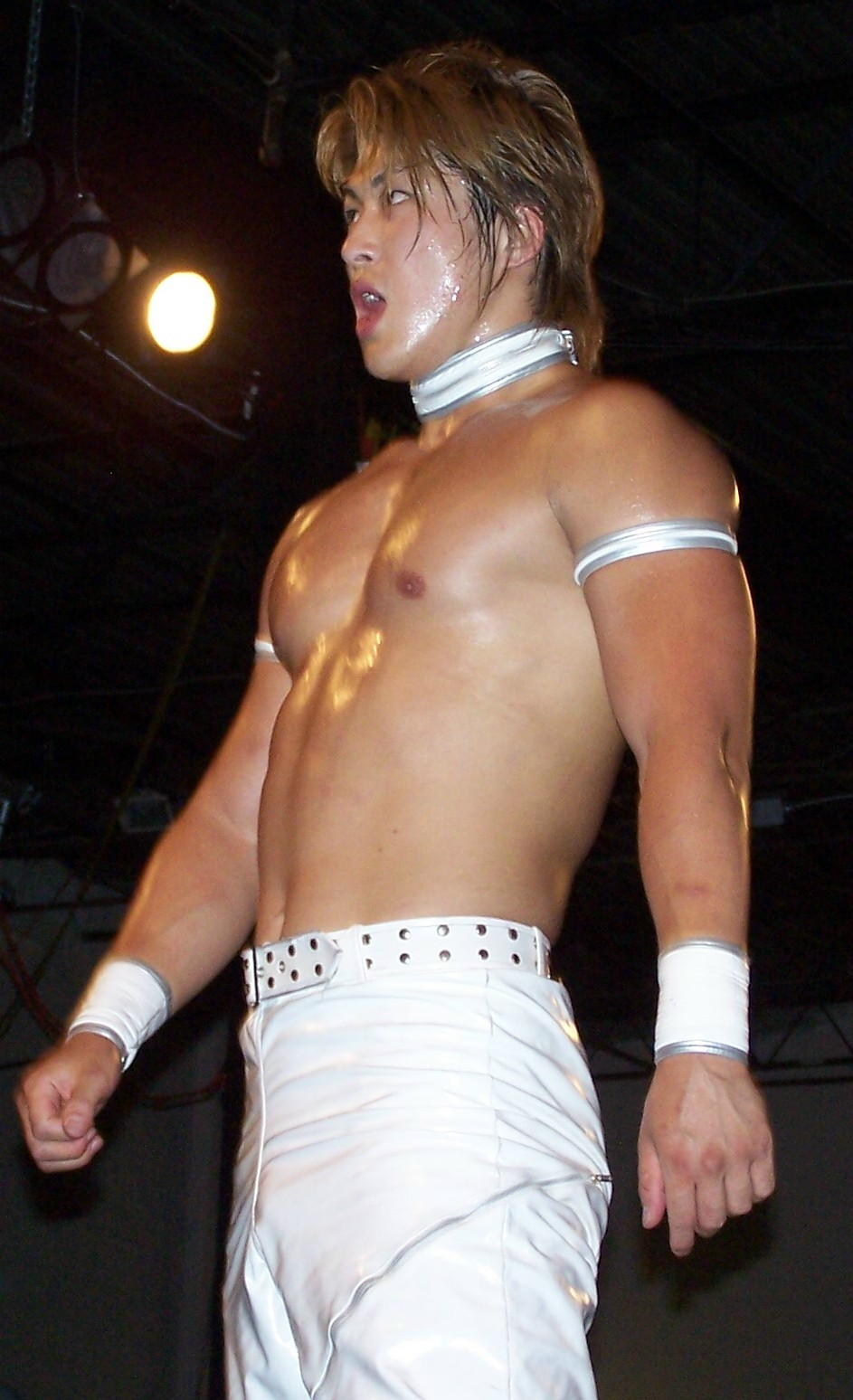
- BxB Hulk in 2006

Personal information
- Born: Terumasa Ishihara; July 15, 1980 (age 46) Sapporo, Hokkaido, Japan

Professional wrestling career
- Ring name(s): BxB Hulk; Killer Hulk; Black Hulk; Terumasa Ishihara
- Billed height: 1.78 m (5 ft 10 in)
- Billed weight: 81 kg (179 lb)
- Trained by: Dragon Gate Dojo; Hayabusa; Magnum Tokyo
- Debut: March 5, 2005

Terumasa Ishihara (石原 輝政, Ishihara Terumasa; born July 15, 1980), better known by his ring name B×B Hulk (B×Bハルク, Bī Bī Haruku) (/bbhʌlk/ BEE-BEE-hulk), is a Japanese professional wrestler. As of 2005, he is currently working for Dragon Gate. He was also known for his longstanding rivalry with Shingo Takagi.

== Professional wrestling career ==
He was the second student from the Dragon Gate Dojo. He was brought into Dragon Gate by Magnum Tokyo, with Tokyo's influence evident in many aspects of his character, most notably his trademark pre-match dance routine. Magnum Tokyo had him placed in the Pos.Hearts unit he created ("Pos." representing the limitless possibilities Hulk showed), with Anthony W. Mori and Super Shisa as the other members. The unit largely served as a launching pad to get his career off the ground. Pos.Hearts would have only one major success, winning the Open the Triangle Gate titles in December 2006 from Naruki Doi, Masato Yoshino and Gamma, but they lost the titles in their first defense the following month back to them, and when they lost to them again the month after that, they were forced to dissolve the unit.

He would join up with CIMA's Typhoon stable, but a few months later, in the midst of Typhoon's feud with the faction Muscle Outlaw'z, he and MO'z member Cyber Kong both betrayed their stables to join together and form New Hazard, along with Shingo Takagi and YAMATO. While in the group, he would hold the Triangle Gate titles twice, and most notably, he and Takagi would win the GHC Junior Heavyweight Tag Team Championship in January 2008.

In April, YAMATO betrayed New Hazard and defected to Muscle Outlaw'z. A month later, Takagi and Kong turned on BxB Hulk before they were to defend the Triangle Gate titles against YAMATO, Genki Horiguchi and Gamma, citing him as a weakling, effectively vacating the titles and ending New Hazard. Then, Naruki Doi and Masato Yoshino — who had recently split from MO'z — came to his aid, and although the trio failed to win the vacant titles from Takagi, YAMATO & Gamma of the newly formed Real Hazard, they formed a new unit with Naoki Tanizaki and m.c.KZ called WORLD-1.

On June 12, BxB Hulk unveiled a persona that he had hinted at doing several months ago called "Killer Hulk" (later renamed Black Hulk), wearing black pants and black make-up and using a violent fighting style. Under this persona, he dismantled Real Hazard's Yasushi Kanda, blowing off what was left of their feud that they had going on for the last few months. He then got into a feud with Takagi. They fought in a match on June 29 to determine the #1 contender for CIMA's Open the Dream Gate Championship, but the match ended in a one-hour draw. They were soon scheduled to do battle again on July 27, but this time it would be for the Open the Dream Gate Title itself, due to CIMA vacating it because of a neck injury. Hulk lost that match, but his performance impressed Takagi enough that he retracted his statement about Hulk being weak and shook hands with him. He then got into a feud with Gamma, and he as Black Hulk fought Gamma as Gamma Daiou on November 16, which he won by count-out after putting Gamma through a table outside the ring with his E.V.O. finisher.

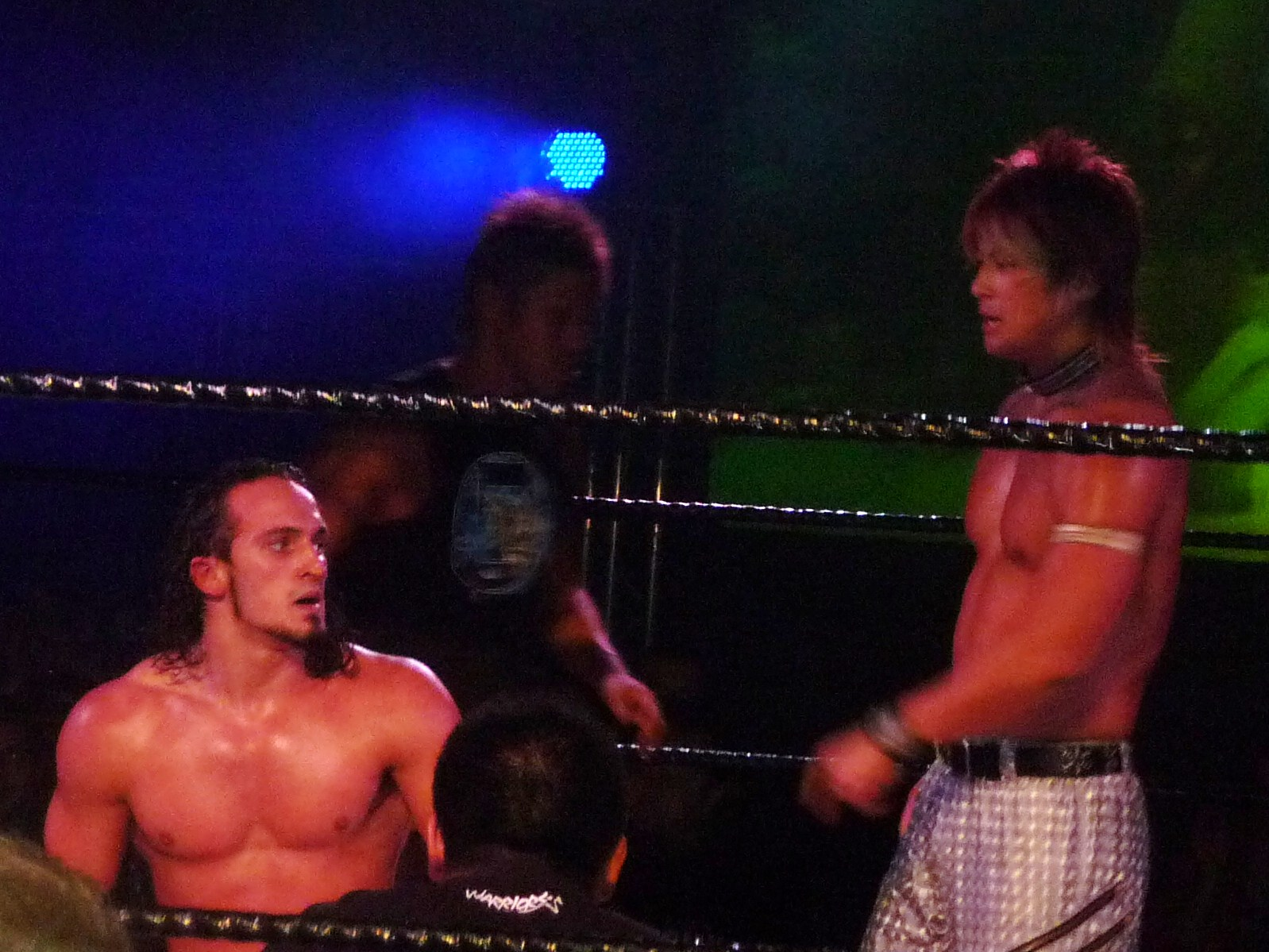
Hulk (right) with his World-1 stable-mate PAC (left) in November 2009

In March 2009, YAMATO began provoking him, and even offered him membership into Real Hazard under his Black Hulk persona. He responded by randomly attacking members of Real Hazard under his Black Hulk persona until YAMATO and the rest of the group got the better of him on April 15. YAMATO then challenged him to a match, and he did not care whether he fought Hulk as Black Hulk or his normal self. Hulk fought YAMATO as Black Hulk and won by referee stoppage.

On June 7, he won the Triangle Gate titles with Masato Yoshino and PAC, and they held them for three months before losing them to Masaaki Mochizuki, Don Fujii & Akebono. He challenged his stablemate Naruki Doi for the Open the Dream Gate Title on November 23, but was unsuccessful in capturing the title. However, five days later, he became the inaugural Open the Freedom Gate Champion of Dragon Gate USA by winning a 14-man tournament at DGUSA Freedom Fight. On July 11, 2010, BxB Hulk lost a Hair vs. Hair match against Shingo Takagi and was as a result shaved bald. On October 29, 2010, Hulk successfully retained his Open the Freedom Gate Championship by defeating Shingo in the main event of Dragon Gate USA's inaugural iPPV "Bushido: Code of the Warrior". On January 28, 2011, at the United: NYC pay-per-view, Hulk lost the Open the Freedom Gate Championship to YAMATO. On April 14, 2011, Hulk, PAC and Susumu Yokosuka failed to win the Open the Triangle Gate Championship from Blood Warriors (CIMA, Dragon Kid and Ricochet) and as a result, WORLD-1 was forced to disband.

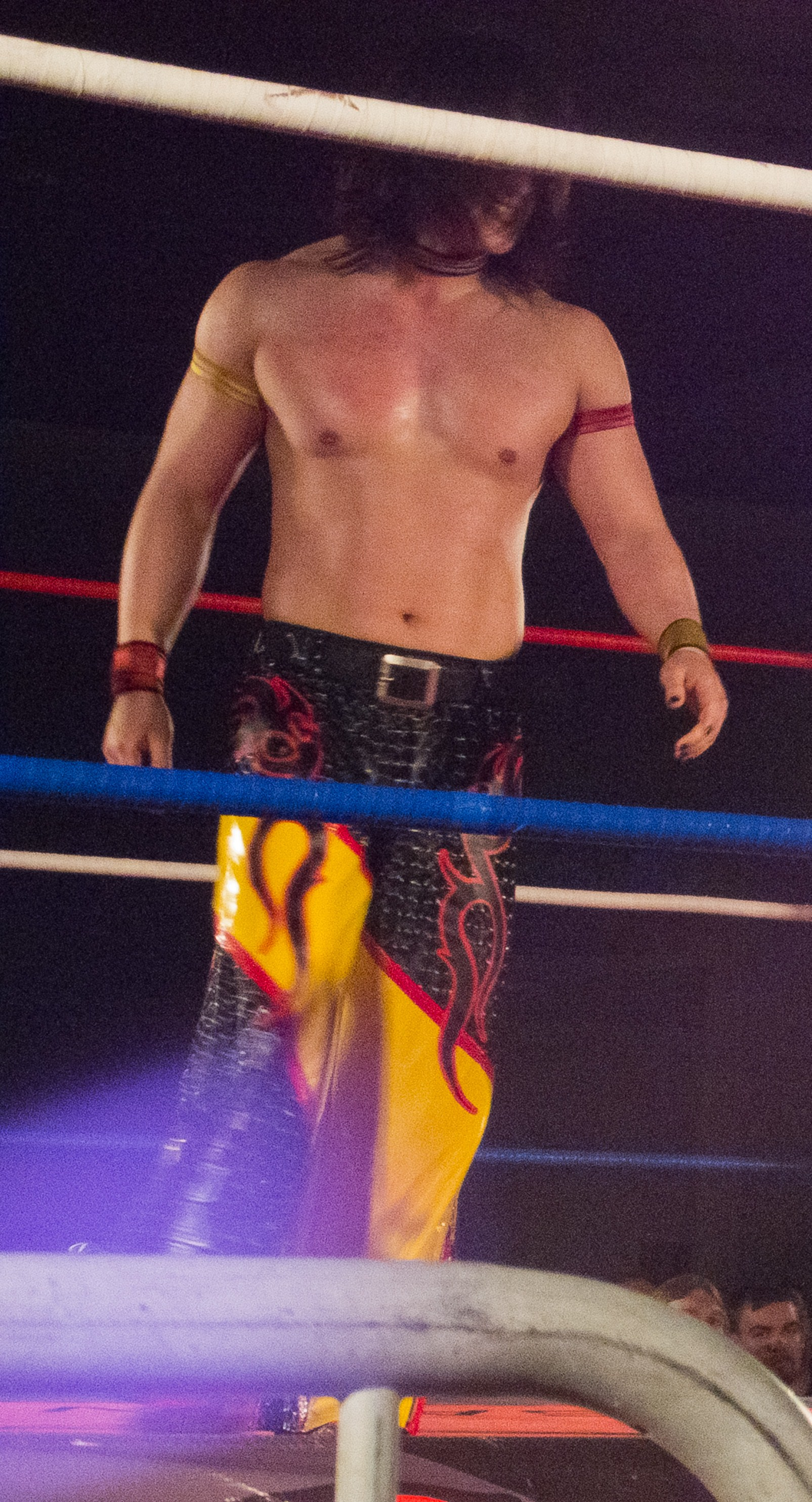
Ishihara in 2012

On April 24, former WORLD-1 members Hulk, PAC, Yokosuka and Yoshino agreed to form a new alliance with Masaaki Mochizuki to battle Blood Warriors. On May 21, Hulk first defeated CIMA in the semifinals and then CIMA's Blood Warriors stablemate Yasushi Kanda in the finals to win the 2011 King of Gate tournament. However, much to Hulk's surprise, Masaaki Mochizuki named Kanda the next challenger to his Open the Dream Gate Championship. On June 8, before Hulk was scheduled to team with Shingo Tagaki, Naoki Tanizaki came out dressed as Black Hulk. With Takagi distracted with Tanizaki, Hulk hit Takagi with a chair, turning heel and joining Blood Warriors. Hulk finally received his shot at the Open the Dream Gate Championship on July 17, but was defeated by Masaaki Mochizuki. On August 7, Hulk and Akira Tozawa defeated Masaaki Mochizuki and YAMATO in the finals to win the 2011 Summer Adventure Tag League. On December 1, Hulk and Tozawa defeated KAGETORA and Susumu Yokosuka to win the vacant Open the Twin Gate Championship. On January 19, 2012, Hulk and Tozawa turned on CIMA, causing him to lose a ten-man "Loser Leaves Unit" tag team match; as a result, CIMA was kicked out of Blood Warriors. On March 1, the new leader of Blood Warriors, Akira Tozawa, changed the stable's name to Mad Blankey. On March 4, Hulk and Tozawa lost the Open the Twin Gate Championship to Jimmy Kagetora and Jimmy Susumu. Hulk regained the title from the Jimmyz on June 10, teaming with "Naoki Tanisaki". However, they lost the belts back to Jimmy Kagetora and Jimmy Susumu on June 17 in a 3-way elimination tag team match which also included MadoGiwa Windows members K-ness & Kenichiro Arai. On August 19, Hulk, Tozawa and Naoki Tanisaki defeated CIMA, Gamma and Magnitude Kishiwada to win the 2012 Summer Adventure Tag League and the vacant Open the Triangle Gate Championship. They lost the title to Kaettekita Veteran-gun (Gamma, HUB and Magnitude Kishiwada) on October 21. On June 15, 2013, Hulk and Tozawa regained the Open the Twin Gate Championship from Shingo Takagi and Yamato, when Yamato turned on Takagi and joined Mad Blankey. Hulk and Tozawa went on to lose the title to Naruki Doi and Ricochet on July 21. On May 5, 2014, after being the last to escape and win the Cage match at Dead or Alive 2014, Hulk quit Mad Blankey, thus turning face. After losing the rights to the Mad Blankey name and logo, he soon began a gradual return to his dancer gimmick, teaming up with Masaaki Mochizuki (who was competing as BxB Masa) on July 3, 2014, to unsuccessfully challenge the Mad Blankey team of YAMATO and Naruki Doi after Hulk was attacked by Dr. Muscle. On July 20, Hulk defeated YAMATO to win the Open the Dream Gate Championship for the first time. After a reign of only 16 days, Hulk lost the title to Naruki Doi in a four-on-one handicap match on August 5, which also included Doi's Mad Blankey partners Cyber Kong, Kzy and Mondai Ryu. On August 17, Hulk defeated Doi, now recognized as a "provisional" champion, in a one-on-one match to resume his first title reign and make his first successful title defense. On September 9 BxB Hulk formed his new stable called Dia Hearts alongside Maasaki Mochizuki and Dragon Kid. On October 5, Hulk made his 2nd successful title defense against Cyber Kong of Mad Blankey. On November 2, Hulk made his 3rd successful title defense against Monster express member and former tag team partner Akira Tozawa. On December 28, BxB Hulk successfully defended his belt for the 4th time against Shingo Takagi. Hulk separated his shoulder during the match but was not forced to vacate and made his surprise return January 11, 2015, defeating Punch Tominaga. On June 14, Hulk lost the Open the Dream Gate Championship to Masato Yoshino in his eighth title defense. On February 4, 2016, Dia.HEARTS was forced to disband after losing a match to Monster Express and VerserK. On May 28, Hulk, along with YAMATO, Kzy, and Yosuke♥Santa Maria, formed a new unit named Tribe Vanguard.

In October 2018, Eita announced that R.E.D would be joined by two new members, with their identity being kept in secret under the disguise of Dr. Muscle, known as the Green and Red Masked Demons, respectively. On December 15 at Final Gate, Hulk and YAMATO defeated Eita and Big R Shimizu to regain the Open The Twin Gate Championship. Three days later, Hulk turned on YAMATO to join R.E.D, revealing himself to be the Red Masked Demon. He would blame YAMATO for inviting KAI to the stable, while he was injured when KAI also had a neck injury. This led to Hulk stealing the Open The Twin Gate Championship belts. Afterwards, R.E.D began a "Generation War" against Dragon Gate and Toryumon. On December 22, YAMATO forfeited his half of the Open The Twin Gate Championship, leading to Hulk protest against the decision. Afterwards, General Manager Takayuki Yagi declared the titles vacated, with the new champions being crowned in a tournament in January which he would later win with Kazma Sakamoto. Later that month, Hulk, Sakamoto and Takashi Yoshida took part in the 2020 Ashiyanikki Cup 6 Man Tag Team Tournament. In the first round of the tournament, Hulk helped Eita, Ishida and Shimizu to defeat the Dragon Gate trio of YAMATO, KAI and Kzy, leading KAI to get his revenge and cost Hulk, Sakamoto and Yoshida's match against Ben-K, Strong Machine J and Dragon Dia.

== Championships and accomplishments ==
- Dragon Gate
  - Open the Dream Gate Championship (1 time)
  - Open the Triangle Gate Championship (10 times) – with CIMA and Jack Evans (1), Anthony W. Mori and Super Shisa (1), Shingo Takagi and Cyber Kong (2), Masato Yoshino and PAC (1), Akira Tozawa and Naoki Tanisaki (1), Cyber Kong and YAMATO (1), YAMATO and Kzy (1) Ben-K and Kota Minoura (1) and Kagetora and Susumu Yokosuka (1)
  - Open the Twin Gate Championship (9 times) – with Akira Tozawa (2), Naoki Tanisaki (1), Uhaa Nation (1) Yamato (2), Kazma Sakamoto (1) and, KAI (2)
  - 6 Unit Warfare One Night Tag Tournament (2012) – with Naoki Tanisaki
  - King of Gate (2011)
  - Summer Adventure Tag League (2011) – with Akira Tozawa
  - Summer Adventure Tag League (2012) – with Akira Tozawa and Naoki Tanisaki
- Dragon Gate USA
  - Open the Freedom Gate Championship (1 time)
- Pro Wrestling Illustrated
  - PWI ranked him #59 of the top 500 singles wrestlers in the PWI 500 in 2015
- Pro Wrestling Noah
  - GHC Junior Heavyweight Tag Team Championship (1 time) – with Shingo Takagi
- Tokyo Sports
  - Newcomer Award (2007)
  - Technique Award (2014)

=== Luchas de Apuestas record ===
Winner (wager)	Loser (wager)	Location	Event	Date	Notes
Shingo Takagi (hair)	BxB Hulk (hair)	Kobe, Japan	Live event	July 11, 2010	
BxB Hulk (hair of Cyber Kong)	Naruki Doi (hair of Kzy)	Aichi, Japan	Dead Or Alive 2014	May 5, 2014	(Note: This was a six-way steel cage match, also involving CIMA (Dragon Kid), Jimmy Kanda (Jimmy Susumu), Masato Yoshino (Shachihoko Boy) and Mr. Kyu Kyu Naoki Tanizaki Toyonaka Dolphin (Genki Horiguchi H.A.Gee.Mee!!))
