= Rey de Parejas =

Professional wrestling tag team tournament

The Rey de Parejas (Spanish for "King of Tag Teams") is a professional wrestling round-robin tag team tournament held by Dragongate. It was created in 2003 by Toryumon Japan to determine the strongest tag team of the promotion. In 2004, after Último Dragón left Toryumon with the name and trademarks associated, the Toryumon Japan roster and staff formed Dragon Gate and a second Rey de Parejas tournament was held to establish the inaugural Open the Triangle Gate Championship as a spiritual successor to the UWA World Trios Championship.

From 2007 to 2016, the tournament was held as the Summer Adventure Tag League. In 2011, it was held as a single-elimination tournament under the name of Summer Adventure Tag Tournament. In 2012, the tournament featured trios instead of tag teams. In 2023, the tournament was revived as the Rey de Parejas once again.

The tournament is held under a points system, with 2 points for a win, 1 for a time limit draw, and 0 for a loss, no contest or double decision. The two top-scoring teams in each block advance to a single-elimination playoff to determine the winners of the Rey de Parejas.

== List of winners ==
Tournament	Year	Winners (total won as an individual)	Total won as a team	Refs.
Rey de Parejas; Toryumon Tag League	2003	Hagure Gundam (Dotti Shuji and "brother" Yasshi)	1	
Rey de Parejas; Inaugural Open the Triangle Gate Championship 6-Man Tag League	2004	Italian Connection (Milano Collection A. T., Yossino and Anthony W. Mori)	1	
Summer Adventure Tag League	2007	Muscle Outlaw'z (Naruki Doi and Masato Yoshino (2))	1	
Summer Adventure Tag League II	2008	World-1 (Naruki Doi (2) and Masato Yoshino (3))	2	
Summer Adventure Tag League III	2009	Kamikaze (Shingo Takagi and Yamato)	1	
Summer Adventure Tag League IV	2010	World-1 (Masato Yoshino (4) and Naruki Doi (3))	3	
Summer Adventure Tag Tournament 2011	2011	Blood Warriors (B×B Hulk and Akira Tozawa)	1	
Summer Adventure Tag League 2012	2012	Blankey Yellow (B×B Hulk (2), Akira Tozawa (2) and "Naoki Tanizaki")	1	
Summer Adventure Tag League 2013	2013	Millenials (T-Hawk (2) and Eita)	1	
Summer Adventure Tag League 2014	2014	Jimmyz (Jimmy Susumu and Jimmy Kagetora)	1	
Summer Adventure Tag League 2015	2015	Jimmyz (Jimmy Susumu (2) and Jimmy K-ness J. K. S.)	1	
Summer Adventure Tag League 2016	2016	Over Generation (Eita (2) and Dragon Kid)	1	
Rey de Parejas 2023	2023	D'Courage (Yuki Yoshioka and Madoka Kikuta)	1	
Rey de Parejas 2024	2024	Dragon Kid (2) and Naruki Doi (4)	1	
Rey de Parejas 2025	2025	Shun Skywalker and Homare	1	
Rey de Parejas 2026	2026	El Cielo and Luis Mante	1	

== Results ==
=== 2003 ===
The first Rey de Parejas featured eight teams in a single block and was held from October 5 to October 26, 2003.

Final standings
Wrestlers	Score
Dotti Shuji and "brother" Yasshi	10
Susumu Yokosuka and K-ness.	10
Magnum Tokyo and Milano Collection A. T.	9
Cima and Jun	9
Dragon Kid and Kenichiro Arai	8
Yossino and Anthony W. Mori	4
Masaaki Mochizuki and Second Doi	4
Karaoke Machine #1 and Karaoke Machine #2	2

Results	Magnum Milano	Cima Jun	Mochizuki Doi	Kid Arai	Yokosuka K-ness.	Yossino Mori	Shuji Yasshi	Machine #1 Machine #2
Magnum Milano	—N/a	Draw (30:00)	Magnum; Milano (12:35)	Magnum; Milano (13:38)	Yokosuka; K-ness. (17:03)	Magnum; Milano (16:08)	Shuji; Yasshi (15:23)	Magnum; Milano (5:51)
Cima Jun	Draw (30:00)	—N/a	Cima; Jun (13:52)	Cima; Jun (12:46)	Yokosuka; K-ness. (14:14)	Cima; Jun (11:23)	Shuji; Yasshi (4:05)	Cima; Jun (8:25)
Mochizuki Doi	Magnum; Milano (12:35)	Cima; Jun (13:52)	—N/a	Kid; Arai (10:54)	Yokosuka; K-ness. (13:27)	Mochizuki; Doi (11:03)	Shuji; Yasshi (15:36)	Mochizuki; Doi (6:02)
Kid Arai	Magnum; Milano (13:38)	Cima; Jun (12:46)	Kid; Arai (10:54)	—N/a	Yokosuka; K-ness. (12:56)	Kid; Arai (9:34)	Kid; Arai (12:41)	Kid; Arai (9:06)
Yokosuka K-ness.	Yokosuka; K-ness. (17:03)	Yokosuka; K-ness. (14:14)	Yokosuka; K-ness. (13:27)	Yokosuka; K-ness. (12:56)	—N/a	Yossino; Mori (12:17)	Shuji; Yasshi (11:41)	Yokosuka; K-ness. (11:30)
Yossino Mori	Magnum; Milano (16:08)	Cima; Jun (11:23)	Mochizuki; Doi (11:03)	Kid; Arai (9:34)	Yossino; Mori (12:17)	—N/a	Shuji; Yasshi (14:04)	Yossino; Mori (7:09)
Shuji Yasshi	Shuji; Yasshi (15:23)	Shuji; Yasshi (4:05)	Shuji; Yasshi (15:36)	Kid; Arai (12:41)	Shuji; Yasshi (11:41)	Shuji; Yasshi (14:04)	—N/a	Machine #1; Machine #2 (8:21)
Machine #1 Machine #2	Magnum; Milano (5:51)	Cima; Jun (8:25)	Mochizuki; Doi (6:02)	Kid; Arai (9:06)	Yokosuka; K-ness. (11:30)	Yossino; Mori (7:09)	Machine #1; Machine #2 (8:21)	—N/a

Final
1	Dotti Shuji and "brother" Yasshi	Pin
2	Susumu Yokosuka and K-ness.	19:24

=== 2004 ===
The 2004 edition of the Rey de Parejas took place from October 3 to November 7. The tournament featured seven trios competing in a single block to win the newly created Open the Triangle Gate Championship. From October 28 onward, Ryo Saito replaced Magnum Tokyo who suffered an injury.

Do Fixer (Magnum Tokyo/Ryo Saito, Dragon Kid and Genki Horiguchi), Final M2K (Masaaki Mochizuki, Susumu Yokosuka and K-ness.) and Italian Connection (Milano Collection A. T., Yossino and Anthony W. Mori) finished tied in second place with 6 points each and equal head-to-head results. An elimination three-way match was held on November 6 to break the tie, which was won by Italian Connection. The next day, they won the final against Aagan Iisou (Shuji Kondo, "brother" Yasshi and Takuya Sugawara) and became the first Open the Triangle Gate Champions.

Final standings
Wrestlers	Score
Shuji Kondo, "brother" Yasshi and Takuya Sugawara (Aagan Iisou)	8
Magnum Tokyo/Ryo Saito, Dragon Kid and Genki Horiguchi (Do Fixer)	6
Masaaki Mochizuki, Susumu Yokosuka and K-ness. (Final M2K)	6
Milano Collection A. T., Yossino and Anthony W. Mori (Italian Connection)	6
Cima, Taru and Shingo Takagi (Crazy-Max)	4
Don Fujii, Second Doi and Naoki Tanizaki (Iron Perms)	4
Michael Iwasa, Daniel Mishima and Johnson Florida (Florida Express)	4

Results	Magnum/Saito Kid Horiguchi	Cima Taru Takagi	Mochizuki Yokosuka K-ness.	Milano Yossino Mori	Kondo Yasshi Sugawara	Fujii Doi Tanizaki	Iwasa Mishima Florida
Magnum/Saito Kid Horiguchi	—N/a	Magnum; Kid; Horiguchi (15:05)	Kid; Horiguchi; Saito (22:02)	Milano; Yossino; Mori (22:25)	Kondo; Yasshi; Sugawara (16:09)	Magnum; Kid; Horiguchi (17:45)	Iwasa; Mishima; Florida (12:13)
Cima Taru Takagi	Magnum; Kid; Horiguchi (15:05)	—N/a	Mochizuki; Yokosuka; K-ness. (Forfeit)	Cima; Taru; Takagi (18:21)	Kondo; Yasshi; Sugawara (12:46)	Fujii; Doi; Tanizaki (15:49)	Cima; Taru; Takagi (10:54)
Mochizuki Yokosuka K-ness.	Kid; Horiguchi; Saito (22:02)	Mochizuki; Yokosuka; K-ness. (Forfeit)	—N/a	Mochizuki; Yokosuka; K-ness. (22:07)	Double; Countout (5:28)	Fujii; Doi; Tanizaki (14:45)	Mochizuki; Yokosuka; K-ness. (11:59)
Milano Yossino Mori	Milano; Yossino; Mori (22:25)	Cima; Taru; Takagi (18:21)	Mochizuki; Yokosuka; K-ness. (22:07)	—N/a	Kondo; Yasshi; Sugawara (13:14)	Milano; Yossino; Mori (16:10)	Milano; Yossino; Mori (10:37)
Kondo Yasshi Sugawara	Kondo; Yasshi; Sugawara (16:09)	Kondo; Yasshi; Sugawara (12:46)	Double; Countout (5:28)	Kondo; Yasshi; Sugawara (13:14)	—N/a	Kondo; Yasshi; Sugawara (14:19)	Iwasa; Mishima; Florida (6:20)
Fujii Doi Tanizaki	Magnum; Kid; Horiguchi (17:45)	Fujii; Doi; Tanizaki (15:49)	Fujii; Doi; Tanizaki (14:45)	Milano; Yossino; Mori (16:10)	Kondo; Yasshi; Sugawara (14:19)	—N/a	Double; DQ (12:34)
Iwasa Mishima Florida	Iwasa; Mishima; Florida (12:13)	Cima; Taru; Takagi (10:54)	Mochizuki; Yokosuka; K-ness. (11:59)	Milano; Yossino; Mori (10:37)	Iwasa; Mishima; Florida (6:20)	Double; DQ (12:34)	—N/a

Tie-breaker
Masaaki Mochizuki, Susumu Yokosuka and K-ness.	29:38
Dragon Kid, Genki Horiguchi and Ryo Saito	25:02
Milano Collection A. T., Yossino and Anthony W. Mori	Pin

Final
1	Shuji Kondo, "brother" Yasshi and Takuya Sugawara	17:26
2	Milano Collection A. T., Yossino and Anthony W. Mori	Pin

Three-way elimination tie-breaker match
Eliminated	Wrestler	Team	Eliminated by	Method	Time
1	Genki Horiguchi	Do Fixer	Susumu Yokosuka	Pinfall	25:02
2	Susumu Yokosuka	Final M2K	Milano Collection A. T.	Pinfall	29:38
Winners:	Italian Connection (Milano Collection A. T., Yossino and Anthony W. Mori)				

=== 2007 ===
The first Summer Adventure Tag League was held from August 5 to August 26, 2007. The tournament featured ten teams in a single block, with the top-four scoring teams advancing to a single-elimination bracket. Block matches were fought with a 20-minute time limit; semi-finals with a 30-minute time limit. B×B Hulk and Yamato were originally scheduled to participate in the league, but both men got injured and had to withdraw. They were replaced by Lupin Matsutani and m.c.KZ.

Final standings
Wrestlers	Score
Naruki Doi and Masato Yoshino	14
Susumu Yokosuka and Ryo Saito	14
Shingo Takagi and Cyber Kong	14
Kenichiro Arai and Taku Iwasa	14
Masaaki Mochizuki and Yasushi Kanda	10
Cima and Dragon Kid	10
Don Fujii and K-ness.	6
Lupin Matsutani and m.c.KZ.	4
Super Shisa and Shisa Boy	2
Gamma and Genki Horiguchi	2

Results	Cima Kid	Yokosuka Saito	Doi Yoshino	Gamma Horiguchi	Takagi Kong	Matsutani m.c.KZ.	Mochizuki Kanda	Shisa Boy	Arai Iwasa	Fujii K-ness.
Cima Kid	—N/a	Yokosuka; Saito (15:04)	Cima; Kid (16:28)	Cima; Kid (11:03)	Takagi; Kong (15:48)	Cima; Kid (11:55)	Mochizuki; Kanda (9:11)	Cima; Kid (11:40)	Arai; Iwasa (19:38)	Cima; Kid (12:25)
Yokosuka Saito	Yokosuka; Saito (15:04)	—N/a	Doi; Yoshino (17:59)	Yokosuka; Saito (15:37)	Yokosuka; Saito (15:04)	Yokosuka; Saito (13:23)	Yokosuka; Saito (13:07)	Yokosuka; Saito (14:00)	Arai; Iwasa (16:27)	Yokosuka; Saito (11:19)
Doi Yoshino	Cima; Kid (16:28)	Doi; Yoshino (17:59)	—N/a	Gamma; Horiguchi (15:28)	Doi; Yoshino (15:40)	Doi; Yoshino (10:44)	Doi; Yoshino (15:59)	Doi; Yoshino (8:58)	Doi; Yoshino (16:13)	Doi; Yoshino (12:11)
Gamma Horiguchi	Cima; Kid (11:03)	Yokosuka; Saito (15:37)	Gamma; Horiguchi (15:28)	—N/a	Takagi; Kong (10:19)	Matsutani m.c.KZ. (9:34)	Mochizuki; Kanda (9:32)	Shisa; Boy (10:47)	Arai; Iwasa (11:47)	Fujii; K-ness. (11:38)
Takagi Kong	Takagi; Kong (15:48)	Yokosuka; Saito (15:04)	Doi; Yoshino (15:40)	Takagi; Kong (10:19)	—N/a	Takagi; Kong (10:00)	Takagi; Kong (8:21)	Takagi; Kong (8:43)	Takagi; Kong (12:13)	Takagi; Kong (13:28)
Matsutani m.c.KZ.	Cima; Kid (11:55)	Yokosuka; Saito (13:23)	Doi; Yoshino (10:44)	Matsutani m.c.KZ. (9:34)	Takagi; Kong (10:00)	—N/a	Mochizuki; Kanda (10:09)	Matsutani m.c.KZ. (11:57)	Arai; Iwasa (10:41)	Fujii; K-ness. (9:32)
Mochizuki Kanda	Mochizuki; Kanda (9:11)	Yokosuka; Saito (13:07)	Doi; Yoshino (15:59)	Mochizuki; Kanda (9:32)	Takagi; Kong (8:21)	Mochizuki; Kanda (10:09)	—N/a	Mochizuki; Kanda (10:16)	Arai; Iwasa (12:07)	Mochizuki; Kanda (9:58)
Shisa Boy	Cima; Kid (11:40)	Yokosuka; Saito (14:00)	Doi; Yoshino (8:58)	Shisa; Boy (10:47)	Takagi; Kong (8:43)	Matsutani m.c.KZ. (11:57)	Mochizuki; Kanda (10:16)	—N/a	Arai; Iwasa (8:53)	Fujii; K-ness. (8:45)
Arai Iwasa	Arai; Iwasa (19:38)	Arai; Iwasa (16:27)	Doi; Yoshino (16:13)	Arai; Iwasa (11:47)	Takagi; Kong (12:13)	Arai; Iwasa (10:41)	Arai; Iwasa (12:07)	Arai; Iwasa (8:53)	—N/a	Arai; Iwasa (9:33)
Fujii K-ness.	Cima; Kid (12:25)	Yokosuka; Saito (11:19)	Doi; Yoshino (12:11)	Fujii; K-ness. (11:38)	Takagi; Kong (13:28)	Fujii; K-ness. (9:32)	Mochizuki; Kanda (9:58)	Fujii; K-ness. (8:45)	Arai; Iwasa (9:33)	—N/a

Semi-finals
Susumu Yokosuka and Ryo Saito	16:42
Shingo Takagi and Cyber Kong	Pin
Kenichiro Arai and Taku Iwasa	13:24
Naruki Doi and Masato Yoshino	Sub

Final
Shingo Takagi and Cyber Kong	23:52
Naruki Doi and Masato Yoshino	Pin

=== 2008 ===
The second edition of the Summer Adventure Tag League was held from August 9 to August 28, 2008. The tournament featured the same format as the previous year, with one fewer team. On the opening day, held at Korakuen Hall, the steel structure of the ring broke during the first match. The ring was dismantled and a wrestling mat taped to the floor without ropes was used for the remainder of the event, as the ring crew was unable to repair it on site and it was deemed too dangerous.

Final standings
Wrestlers	Score
Yamato and Cyber Kong	14
Dragon Kid and Shingo Takagi	12
Naruki Doi and Masato Yoshino	10
Susumu Yokosuka and Ryo Saito	10
Matt Jackson and Nick Jackson	8
Kenichiro Arai and Taku Iwasa	8
Gamma and Yasushi Kanda	6
Masaaki Mochizuki and Don Fujii	2
B×B Hulk and Naoki Tanizaki	2

Results	Doi Yoshino	Arai Iwasa	Yokosuka Saito	Mochizuki Fujii	Kid Takagi	Hulk Tanizaki	Gamma Kanda	Yamato Kong	M. Jackson N. Jackson
Doi Yoshino	—N/a	Doi; Yoshino (9:37)	Doi; Yoshino (19:15)	Doi; Yoshino (9:48)	Doi; Yoshino (19:19)	Doi; Yoshino (16:53)	Gamma; Kanda (11:49)	Yamato; Kong (19:12)	M. Jackson; N. Jackson (14:04)
Arai Iwasa	Doi; Yoshino (9:37)	—N/a	Yokosuka; Saito (16:18)	Arai; Iwasa (14:02)	Kid; Takagi (17:18)	Arai; Iwasa (14:12)	Arai; Iwasa (11:54)	Arai; Iwasa (16:12)	M. Jackson; N. Jackson (14:13)
Yokosuka Saito	Doi; Yoshino (19:15)	Yokosuka; Saito (16:18)	—N/a	Yokosuka; Saito (17:45)	Kid; Takagi (18:32)	Yokosuka; Saito (9:37)	Yokosuka; Saito (13:07)	Yamato; Kong (17:36)	Yokosuka; Saito (12:39)
Mochizuki Fujii	Doi; Yoshino (9:48)	Arai; Iwasa (14:02)	Yokosuka; Saito (17:45)	—N/a	Kid; Takagi (13:08)	Mochizuki; Fujii (10:45)	Gamma; Kanda (10:48)	Yamato; Kong (15:24)	M. Jackson; N. Jackson (5:53)
Kid Takagi	Doi; Yoshino (19:19)	Kid; Takagi (17:18)	Kid; Takagi (18:32)	Kid; Takagi (13:08)	—N/a	Kid; Takagi (13:42)	Kid; Takagi (9:37)	Yamato; Kong (19:10)	Kid; Takagi (12:42)
Hulk Tanizaki	Doi; Yoshino (16:53)	Arai; Iwasa (14:12)	Yokosuka; Saito (9:37)	Mochizuki; Fujii (10:45)	Kid; Takagi (13:42)	—N/a	Hulk; Tanizaki (9:44)	Yamato; Kong (16:45)	M. Jackson; N. Jackson (12:49)
Gamma Kanda	Gamma; Kanda (11:49)	Arai; Iwasa (11:54)	Yokosuka; Saito (13:07)	Gamma; Kanda (10:48)	Kid; Takagi (9:37)	Hulk; Tanizaki (9:44)	—N/a	Yamato; Kong (1:22)	Gamma; Kanda (10:28)
Yamato Kong	Yamato; Kong (19:12)	Arai; Iwasa (16:12)	Yamato; Kong (17:36)	Yamato; Kong (15:24)	Yamato; Kong (19:10)	Yamato; Kong (16:45)	Yamato; Kong (1:22)	—N/a	Yamato; Kong (12:45)
M. Jackson N. Jackson	M. Jackson; N. Jackson (14:04)	M. Jackson; N. Jackson (14:13)	Yokosuka; Saito (12:39)	M. Jackson; N. Jackson (5:53)	Kid; Takagi (12:42)	M. Jackson; N. Jackson (12:49)	Gamma; Kanda (10:28)	Yamato; Kong (12:45)	—N/a

Semi-finals
Ryo Saito and Susumu Yokosuka	10:02
Naruki Doi and Masato Yoshino	Pin
Yamato and Cyber Kong	14:10
Shingo Takagi and Dragon Kid	Sub

Final
Naruki Doi and Masato Yoshino	Pin
Shingo Takagi and Dragon Kid	25:52

=== 2009 ===
The third edition of the Summer Adventure Tag League was held from August 1 to August 26, 2009.

Final standings
Wrestlers	Score
Shingo Takagi and Yamato	12
Masaaki Mochizuki and Katsuhiko Nakajima	12
Masato Yoshino and B×B Hulk	11
Yasushi Kanda and Kenichiro Arai	10
Naruki Doi and Naoki Tanizaki	9
Susumu Yokosuka and Kagetora	8
Dragon Kid and Akira Tozawa	4
Cyber Kong and Kzy	4
Cima and Gamma	2

Results	Doi Tanizaki	Yoshino Hulk	Cima Gamma	Yokosuka Kagetora	Takagi Yamato	Kid Tozawa	Kanda Arai	Kong Kzy	Mochizuki Nakajima
Doi Tanizaki	—N/a	Yoshino; Hulk (16:05)	Doi; Tanizaki (15:08)	Yokosuka; Kagetora (15:00)	Takagi; Yamato (17:21)	Doi; Tanizaki (6:52)	Doi; Tanizaki (10:59)	Doi; Tanizaki (9:11)	Draw (20:00)
Yoshino Hulk	Yoshino; Hulk (16:05)	—N/a	Yoshino; Hulk (13:56)	Yoshino; Hulk (15:22)	Draw (20:00)	Kid; Tozawa (11:07)	Kanda; Arai (10:03)	Yoshino; Hulk (10:39)	Yoshino; Hulk (12:02)
Cima Gamma	Doi; Tanizaki (15:08)	Yoshino; Hulk (13:56)	—N/a	Yokosuka; Kagetora (18:44)	Takagi; Yamato (18:34)	Cima; Gamma (12:16)	Kanda; Arai (15:43)	Kong; Kzy (12:58)	Mochizuki; Nakajima (15:05)
Yokosuka Kagetora	Yokosuka; Kagetora (15:00)	Yoshino; Hulk (15:22)	Yokosuka; Kagetora (18:44)	—N/a	Takagi; Yamato (18:50)	Yokosuka; Kagetora (13:16)	Kanda; Arai (10:51)	Yokosuka; Kagetora (10:15)	Mochizuki; Nakajima (14:54)
Takagi Yamato	Takagi; Yamato (17:21)	Draw (20:00)	Takagi; Yamato (18:34)	Takagi; Yamato (18:50)	—N/a	Takagi; Yamato (16:13)	Kanda; Arai (16:45)	Takagi; Yamato (17:24)	Draw (20:00)
Kid Tozawa	Doi; Tanizaki (6:52)	Kid; Tozawa (11:07)	Cima; Gamma (12:16)	Yokosuka; Kagetora (13:16)	Takagi; Yamato (16:13)	—N/a	Kanda; Arai (8:46)	Kid; Tozawa (10:21)	Mochizuki; Nakajima (11:42)
Kanda Arai	Doi; Tanizaki (10:59)	Kanda; Arai (10:03)	Kanda; Arai (15:43)	Kanda; Arai (10:51)	Kanda; Arai (16:45)	Kanda; Arai (8:46)	—N/a	Kong; Kzy (4:19)	Mochizuki; Nakajima (12:29)
Kong Kzy	Doi; Tanizaki (9:11)	Yoshino; Hulk (10:39)	Kong; Kzy (12:58)	Yokosuka; Kagetora (10:15)	Takagi; Yamato (17:24)	Kid; Tozawa (10:21)	Kong; Kzy (4:19)	—N/a	Mochizuki; Nakajima (12:16)
Mochizuki Nakajima	Draw (20:00)	Yoshino; Hulk (12:02)	Mochizuki; Nakajima (15:05)	Mochizuki; Nakajima (14:54)	Draw (20:00)	Mochizuki; Nakajima (11:42)	Mochizuki; Nakajima (12:29)	Mochizuki; Nakajima (12:16)	—N/a

Semi-finals
Shingo Takagi and Yamato	DQ
Yasushi Kanda and Kenichiro Arai	9:30
Masato Yoshino and B×B Hulk	13:26
Masaaki Mochizuki and Katsuhiko Nakajima	Pin

Final
Shingo Takagi and Yamato	TKO
Masaaki Mochizuki and Katsuhiko Nakajima	19:25

=== 2010 ===
The fourth edition of the Summer Adventure Tag League was held from July 30 to August 24, 2010. The tournament featured ten teams in two blocks of five, with the top-two scoring teams of each block advancing to a single-elimination bracket.

Final standings
Block A		Block B	
Susumu Yokosuka and K-ness.	7	Genki Horiguchi and Ryo Saito	7
Masato Yoshino and Naruki Doi	6	Shingo Takagi and Yamato	5
Cima and Gamma	5	Masaaki Mochizuki and Don Fujii	4
Pac and Mark Haskins	2	B×B Hulk and Naoki Tanizaki	2
Cyber Kong and Kagetora	0	Yasushi Kanda and Kzy	2

Block A	Yokosuka K-ness.	Yoshino Doi	Pac Haskins	Cima Gamma	Kong Kagetora
Yokosuka K-ness.	—N/a	Yokosuka; K-ness. (13:58)	K-ness; Yokosuka (12:16)	Draw (20:00)	Yokosuka; K-ness. (14:07)
Yoshino Doi	Yokosuka; K-ness. (13:58)	—N/a	Yoshino; Doi (13:53)	Yoshino; Doi (11:09)	Yoshino; Doi (15:14)
Pac Haskins	Yokosuka; K-ness. (12:16)	Yoshino; Doi (13:53)	—N/a	Cima; Gamma (13:25)	Pac; Haskins (15:15)
Cima Gamma	Draw (20:00)	Yoshino; Doi (11:09)	Cima; Gamma (13:25)	—N/a	Cima; Gamma (6:02)
Kong Kagetora	Yokosuka; K-ness. (14:07)	Yoshino; Doi (15:14)	Pac; Haskins (15:15)	Cima; Gamma (6:02)	—N/a
Block B	Takagi Yamato	Hulk Tanizaki	Mochizuki Fujii	Horiguchi Saito	Kanda Kzy
Takagi Yamato	—N/a	Takagi; Yamato (15:34)	Mochizuki; Fujii (17:11)	Draw (20:00)	Takagi; Yamato (15:42)
Hulk Tanizaki	Takagi; Yamato (15:34)	—N/a	Mochizuki; Fujii (15:45)	Horiguchi; Saito (12:32)	Hulk; Tanizaki (11:04)
Mochizuki Fujii	Mochizuki; Fujii (17:11)	Mochizuki; Fujii (15:45)	—N/a	Horiguchi; Saito (16:01)	Kanda; Kzy (11:51)
Horiguchi Saito	Draw (20:00)	Horiguchi; Saito (12:32)	Horiguchi; Saito (16:01)	—N/a	Horiguchi; Saito (14:27)
Kanda Kzy	Takagi; Yamato (15:42)	Hulk; Tanizaki (11:04)	Kanda; Kzy (11:51)	Horiguchi; Saito (14:27)	—N/a

Semi-finals
A1	Susumu Yokosuka and K-ness.	10:36
A2	Masato Yoshino and Naruki Doi	Pin
B1	Genki Horiguchi and Ryo Saito	Pin
B2	Shingo Takagi and Yamato	14:18

Final
A2	Masato Yoshino and Naruki Doi	Pin
B1	Genki Horiguchi and Ryo Saito	19:16

=== 2011 ===
The 2011 Summer Adventure Tag Tournament was held from August 3 to August 7 across three shows. The tournament featured twelve teams competing in a single-elimination tournament. Four teams received a bye into the second round. Kotoka qualified to be Don Fujii's partner by beating Shisa Boy, Super Shenlong and Eita Kobayashi.

Round 1 August 3	Round 2 August 6
Naoki Tanizaki and Kzy	13:01
Masaaki Mochizuki and Yamato	Pin
Masaaki Mochizuki and Yamato	Pin
Ryo Saito and Genki Horiguchi	22:59
Block A
Don Fujii and Kotoka	10:41
Naruki Doi and Yasushi Kanda	Pin
Naruki Doi and Yasushi Kanda	Pin
Gamma and Rich Swann	12:02
Super Shisa and Kagetora	12:38
B×B Hulk and Akira Tozawa	Pin
B×B Hulk and Akira Tozawa	Pin
Kenichiro Arai and Taku Iwasa	13:57
Block B
Cyber Kong and Tomahawk T.T.	13:34
Shingo Takagi and Susumu Yokosuka	Pin
Shingo Takagi and Susumu Yokosuka	21:06
Masato Yoshino and Dragon Kid	Pin

Semi-finals; August 7
Masaaki Mochizuki and Yamato	Pin
Naruki Doi and Yasushi Kanda	10:02
B×B Hulk and Akira Tozawa	Pin
Masato Yoshino and Dragon Kid	12:51

Final; August 7
Masaaki Mochizuki and Yamato	25:08
B×B Hulk and Akira Tozawa	Pin

=== 2012 ===
The 2012 Summer Adventure Tag League was held from August 2 to August 19. It featured eight trios competing in two blocks of four with the top-scoring team of each block advancing to a final for the Open the Triangle Gate Championship, left vacant after Pac's departure from Dragon Gate. In addition, the last team from each block faced each other to determine the last place.

Super Shenlong III qualified to be Shingo Takagi and Yamato's partner and represent Akatsuki by beating Chihiro Tominaga.

Final standings
Block A		Block B	
B×B Hulk, Akira Tozawa and Naoki Tanizaki (Note: Tomahawk T.T. under the name Naoki Tanizaki (谷崎なおき, Tanizaki Naoki; with "zaki" written as 崎 instead of 嵜).) (Blankey Yellow)	6	Cima, Gamma and Magnitude Kishiwada (South Osaka Strongest Trio)	6
Masaaki Mochizuki, Don Fujii and Dragon Kid (Zetsurinryū)	4	Jimmy Susumu, Jimmy Kanda and Jimmy Kagetora (Shokuninsan)	4
Kenichiro Arai, Super Shisa and Shachihoko Boy (Howl at the Window!)	2	Shingo Takagi, Yamato and Super Shenlong III (Rising Dragon)	2
Genki Horiguchi H.A.Gee.Mee!!, Ryo "Jimmy" Saito and Naoki Tanizaki (MaraIsa Chūi!)	0	Cyber Kong, Kzy and Mondai Ryu (Team Salty Dog)	0

Block A	Mochizuki Fujii Kid	Horiguchi Saito Tanizaki	Hulk Tozawa Tanizaki	Arai Shisa Shachihoko
Mochizuki Fujii Kid	—N/a	Mochizuki; Fujii; Kid (19:52)	Hulk; Tozawa; Tanizaki (20:11)	Mochizuki; Fujii; Kid (14:49)
Horiguchi Saito Tanizaki	Mochizuki; Fujii; Kid (19:52)	—N/a	Hulk; Tozawa; Tanizaki (10:09)	Arai; Shisa; Shachihoko (13:44)
Hulk Tozawa Tanizaki	Hulk; Tozawa; Tanizaki (20:11)	Hulk; Tozawa; Tanizaki (10:09)	—N/a	Hulk; Tozawa; Tanizaki (11:29)
Arai Shisa Shachihoko	Mochizuki; Fujii; Kid (14:49)	Arai; Shisa; Shachihoko (13:44)	Hulk; Tozawa; Tanizaki (11:29)	—N/a
Block B	Cima Gamma Kishiwada	Susumu Kanda Kagetora	Kong Kzy Mondai	Takagi Yamato Shenlong
Cima Gamma Kishiwada	—N/a	Cima; Gamma; Kishiwada (15:00)	Cima; Gamma; Kishiwada (10:50)	Cima; Gamma; Kishiwada (17:30)
Susumu Kanda Kagetora	Cima; Gamma; Kishiwada (15:00)	—N/a	Susumu; Kanda; Kagetora (16:29)	Susumu; Kanda; Kagetora (10:51)
Kong Kzy Mondai	Cima; Gamma; Kishiwada (10:50)	Susumu; Kanda; Kagetora (16:29)	—N/a	Takagi; Yamato; Shenlong (15:25)
Takagi Yamato Shenlong	Cima; Gamma; Kishiwada (17:30)	Susumu; Kanda; Kagetora (10:51)	Takagi; Yamato; Shenlong (15:25)	—N/a

Final
A1	B×B Hulk, Akira Tozawa and Naoki Tanizaki	Pin
B1	Cima, Gamma and Magnitude Kishiwada	23:20

Last place
A4	Genki Horiguchi H.A.Gee.Mee!!, Ryo "Jimmy" Saito and Naoki Tanizaki	Pin
B4	Cyber Kong, Kzy and Mondai Ryu	16:34

=== 2013 ===
The 2013 Summer Adventure Tag League was held from September 7 to September 28. It featured eight teams in two blocks. On the opening day of the tournament, it was announced that Dragon Kid would have to vacate both the Open the Twin Gate and Open the Triangle Gate Championships due to a knee injury. It was then decided that the winners of the Tag League would become interim Open the Twin Gate Champions.

On September 12, the Block A match pitting Shingo Takagi and Akira Tozawa against World-1 International representatives Naruki Doi and Masato Yoshino ended in a no contest decision when the Mad Blankey stable intervened and Doi betrayed his partner Yoshino and joined Mad Blankey, effectively disbanding World-1 International. This caused Yoshino to team up with the Former Super Shenlong III, Yosuke Watanabe for his final Block A match.

Final standings
Block A		Block B	
Yamato and B×B Hulk	4	T-Hawk and Eita	6
Masato Yoshino and Naruki Doi/Former Super Shenlong III, Yosuke Watanabe	2	K-ness. and Gamma	4
Masaaki Mochizuki and Don Fujii	2	Jimmy Susumu and Jimmy Kanda	2
Shingo Takagi and Akira Tozawa	2	Cyber Kong and Mondai Ryu	0

Block A	Yoshino Doi/Watanabe	Mochizuki Fujii	Takagi Tozawa	Yamato Hulk
Yoshino Doi/Watanabe	—N/a	Yoshino; Watanabe (11:33)	No contest (15:26)	Yamato; Hulk (17:39)
Mochizuki Fujii	Yoshino; Watanabe (11:33)	—N/a	Mochizuki; Fujii (15:30)	Yamato; Hulk (17:48)
Takagi Tozawa	No contest (15:26)	Mochizuki; Fujii (15:30)	—N/a	Takagi; Tozawa (21:25)
Yamato Hulk	Yamato; Hulk (17:39)	Yamato; Hulk (17:48)	Takagi; Tozawa (21:25)	—N/a
Block B	K-ness. Gamma	Susumu Kanda	Kong Mondai	T-Hawk Eita
K-ness. Gamma	—N/a	K-ness. Gamma (10:57)	K-ness. Gamma (14:10)	T-Hawk; Eita (11:42)
Susumu Kanda	K-ness. Gamma (10:57)	—N/a	Susumu; Kanda (15:11)	T-Hawk; Eita (12:46)
Kong Mondai	K-ness. Gamma (14:10)	Susumu; Kanda (15:11)	—N/a	T-Hawk; Eita (14:23)
T-Hawk Eita	T-Hawk; Eita (11:42)	T-Hawk; Eita (12:46)	T-Hawk; Eita (14:23)	—N/a

Final
A1	Yamato and B×B Hulk	19:26
B1	T-Hawk and Eita	Pin

=== 2014 ===
The 2014 Summer Adventure Tag League was held from September 6 to September 23. It featured ten teams in two blocks of five, with the top-two scoring teams of each block advancing to a single-elimination bracket. Like in 2012, the last team from each block faced each other to determine the last place.

During the tournament, "Mister High Tension" Kotoka was injured and was replaced by Yuga Hayashi.

Final standings
Block A		Block B	
T-Hawk and Eita	6	B×B Hulk and Masaaki Mochizuki	6
Jimmy Susumu and Jimmy Kagetora	5	Shingo Takagi and Akira Tozawa	6
Cima and Gamma	4	Yamato and Punch Tominaga	4
Masato Yoshino and Shachihoko Boy	3	Genki Horiguchi H.A.Gee.Mee!! and Mr. Kyu Kyu "Naoki Tanizaki" Toyonaka Dolphin	4
Naruki Doi and Kzy	2	"Mister High Tension" Kotoka/Yuga Hayashi and Ryotsu Shimizu	0

Block A	T-Hawk Eita	Cima Gamma	Yoshino Shachihoko	Susumu Kagetora	Doi Kzy
T-Hawk Eita	—N/a	Cima; Gamma (18:06)	T-Hawk; Eita (15:35)	T-Hawk; Eita (16:17)	T-Hawk; Eita (18:28)
Cima Gamma	Cima; Gamma (18:06)	—N/a	Yoshino; Shachihoko (13:56)	Susumu; Kategora (17:33)	Cima; Gamma (11:43)
Yoshino Shachihoko	T-Hawk; Eita (15:35)	Yoshino; Shachihoko (13:56)	—N/a	Draw (20:00)	Doi; Kzy (15:07)
Susumu Kagetora	T-Hawk; Eita (16:17)	Susumu; Kategora (17:33)	Draw (20:00)	—N/a	Susumu; Kategora (16:20)
Doi Kzy	T-Hawk; Eita (18:28)	Cima; Gamma (11:43)	Doi; Kzy (15:07)	Susumu; Kategora (16:20)	—N/a
Block B	Hulk Mochizuki	Takagi Tozawa	Horiguchi Tanizaki	Kotoka/Hayashi Shimizu	Yamato Tominaga
Hulk Mochizuki	—N/a	Hulk; Mochizuki (16:03)	Horiguchi; Tanizaki (13:31)	Hulk; Mochizuki (10:33)	Hulk; Mochizuki (13:21)
Takagi Tozawa	Hulk; Mochizuki (16:03)	—N/a	Takagi; Tozawa (14:06)	Takagi; Tozawa (13:19)	Takagi; Tozawa (16:49)
Horiguchi Tanizaki	Horiguchi; Tanizaki (13:31)	Takagi; Tozawa (14:06)	—N/a	Horiguchi; Tanizaki (10:46)	Yamato; Tominaga (12:46)
Kotoka/Hayashi Shimizu	Hulk; Mochizuki (10:33)	Takagi; Tozawa (13:19)	Horiguchi; Tanizaki (10:46)	—N/a	Yamato; Tominaga (15:41)
Yamato Tominaga	Hulk; Mochizuki (13:21)	Takagi; Tozawa (16:49)	Yamato; Tominaga (12:46)	Yamato; Tominaga (15:41)	—N/a

Semi-finals
B2	Shingo Takagi and Akira Tozawa	19:44
A1	T-Hawk and Eita	Pin
B1	B×B Hulk and Masaaki Mochizuki	18:22
A2	Jimmy Susumu and Jimmy Kagetora	Pin

Final
A1	T-Hawk and Eita	24:06
A2	Jimmy Susumu and Jimmy Kagetora	Pin
Last place
A5	Naruki Doi and Kzy	Pin
B5	Ryotsu Shimizu and Yuga Hayashi	11:53

=== 2015 ===
The 2015 Summer Adventure Tag League was held from September 5 to September 27. It featured ten teams in two blocks of five, with the top-two scoring teams of each block advancing to a single-elimination bracket.

On September 9, Cima was injured and was replaced by Takehiro Yamamura.

Final standings
Block A		Block B	
Naruki Doi and Yamato	6	Masato Yoshino and Akira Tozawa	5
Jimmy Susumu and Jimmy K-ness J.K.S.	6	Sumo Fujii and Ryo "Sumo" Saito	5
B×B Hulk and Kzy	4	Shingo Takagi and Cyber Kong	4
Dragon Kid and Flamita	4	T-Hawk and Big R Shimizu	4
Eita and Kotoka	0	Cima/Takehiro Yamamura and Gamma	2

Block A	Doi Yamato	Susumu K-ness	Kid Flamita	Hulk Kzy	Eita Kotoka
Doi Yamato	—N/a	Doi; Yamato (17:04)	Kid; Flamita (18:08)	Doi; Yamato (18:15)	Doi; Yamato (14:23)
Susumu K-ness	Doi; Yamato (17:04)	—N/a	Susumu; K-ness (13:25)	Susumu; K-ness (14:48)	Susumu; K-ness (15:03)
Kid Flamita	Kid; Flamita (18:08)	Susumu; K-ness (13:25)	—N/a	Hulk; Kzy (14:18)	Kid; Flamita (16:11)
Hulk Kzy	Doi; Yamato (18:15)	Susumu; K-ness (14:48)	Hulk; Kzy (14:18)	—N/a	Hulk; Kzy (15:14)
Eita Kotoka	Doi; Yamato (14:23)	Susumu; K-ness (15:03)	Kid; Flamita (16:11)	Hulk; Kzy (15:14)	—N/a
Block B	Cima/Yamamura Gamma	Yoshino Tozawa	Fujii Saito	Takagi Kong	T-Hawk Shimizu
Cima/Yamamura Gamma	—N/a	Cima; Gamma (15:45)	Fujii; Saito (14:37)	Takagi; Kong (12:08)	T-Hawk; Shimizu (12:03)
Yoshino Tozawa	Cima; Gamma (15:45)	—N/a	Draw (20:00)	Yoshino; Tozawa (14:03)	Yoshino; Tozawa (17:09)
Fujii Saito	Fujii; Saito (14:37)	Draw (20:00)	—N/a	Fujii; Saito (12:38)	T-Hawk; Shimizu (17:38)
Takagi Kong	Takagi; Kong (12:08)	Yoshino; Tozawa (14:03)	Fujii; Saito (12:38)	—N/a	Takagi; Kong (15:22)
T-Hawk Shimizu	T-Hawk; Shimizu (12:03)	Yoshino; Tozawa (17:09)	T-Hawk; Shimizu (17:38)	Takagi; Kong (15:22)	—N/a

Semi-finals
A1	Naruki Doi and Yamato	Pin
B2	Sumo Fujii and Ryo "Sumo" Saito	16:20
B1	Masato Yoshino and Akira Tozawa	19:28
A2	Jimmy Susumu and Jimmy K-ness J.K.S.	Pin

Final
A1	Naruki Doi and Yamato	24:46
A2	Jimmy Susumu and Jimmy K-ness J.K.S.	Pin

=== 2016 ===
The 2016 Summer Adventure Tag League was held from August 6 to September 10. It featured twelve teams in two blocks of six, with the top-two scoring teams of each block advancing to a single-elimination bracket.

Futa Nakamura suffered an injury just before the start of the tournament, forcing him and his partner Masaaki Mochizuki to forfeit their first three matches.

Final standings
Block A		Block B	
Naruki Doi and "brother" Yasshi	10	Dragon Kid and Eita	8
Jimmy Susumu and Jimmy Kagetora	6	Cima and Gamma	7
Masato Yoshino and T-Hawk	6	Akira Tozawa and Big R Shimizu	6
Genki Horiguchi H.A.Gee.Mee!! and Ryo "Jimmy" Saito	4	Yamato and B×B Hulk	6
Takehiro Yamamura and Kaito Ishida	2	Shingo Takagi and Cyber Kong	3
Yosuke ♡ Santa Maria and El Lindaman	2	Masaaki Mochizuki and Futa Nakamura	0

Block A	Susumu Kagetora	Horiguchi Saito	Yoshino T-Hawk	Yosuke Lindaman	Yamamura Ishida	Doi Yasshi
Susumu Kagetora	—N/a	Horiguchi; Saito (14:23)	Susumu; Kagetora (17:30)	Susumu; Kagetora (15:55)	Susumu; Kagetora (13:07)	Doi; Yasshi (15:28)
Horiguchi Saito	Horiguchi; Saito (14:23)	—N/a	Yoshino; T-Hawk (16:16)	Yosuke; Lindaman (14:58)	Horiguchi; Saito (12:14)	Doi; Yasshi (13:37)
Yoshino T-Hawk	Susumu; Kagetora (17:30)	Yoshino; T-Hawk (16:16)	—N/a	Yoshino; T-Hawk (16:36)	Yoshino; T-Hawk (14:22)	Doi; Yasshi (19:01)
Yosuke Lindaman	Susumu; Kagetora (15:55)	Yosuke; Lindaman (14:58)	Yoshino; T-Hawk (16:36)	—N/a	Yamamura; Ishida (12:35)	Doi; Yasshi (15:48)
Yamamura Ishida	Susumu; Kagetora (13:07)	Horiguchi; Saito (12:14)	Yoshino; T-Hawk (14:22)	Yamamura; Ishida (12:35)	—N/a	Doi; Yasshi (8:42)
Doi Yasshi	Doi; Yasshi (15:28)	Doi; Yasshi (13:37)	Doi; Yasshi (19:01)	Doi; Yasshi (15:48)	Doi; Yasshi (8:42)	—N/a
Block B	Yamato Hulk	Tozawa Shimizu	Kid Eita	Takagi Kong	Mochizuki Nakamura	Cima Gamma
Yamato Hulk	—N/a	Tozawa; Shimizu (19:14)	Draw (20:00)	Draw (20:00)	Yamato; Hulk (Forfeit)	Yamato; Hulk (17:00)
Tozawa Shimizu	Tozawa; Shimizu (19:14)	—N/a	Kid; Eita (18:04)	Tozawa; Shimizu (16:02)	Tozawa; Shimizu (Forfeit)	Cima; Gamma (18:26)
Kid Eita	Draw (20:00)	Kid; Eita (18:04)	—N/a	Kid; Eita (15:31)	Kid; Eita (14:41)	Draw (20:00)
Takagi Kong	Draw (20:00)	Tozawa; Shimizu (16:02)	Kid; Eita (15:31)	—N/a	Takagi; Kong (9:33)	Cima; Gamma (10:56)
Mochizuki Nakamura	Yamato; Hulk (Forfeit)	Tozawa; Shimizu (Forfeit)	Kid; Eita (14:41)	Takagi; Kong (9:33)	—N/a	Cima; Gamma (Forfeit)
Cima Gamma	Yamato; Hulk (17:00)	Cima; Gamma (18:26)	Draw (20:00)	Cima; Gamma (10:56)	Cima; Gamma (Forfeit)	—N/a

Semi-finals
A1	Naruki Doi and "brother" Yasshi	Pin
B2	Cima and Gamma	10:12
B1	Dragon Kid and Eita	Pin
A2	Jimmy Susumu and Jimmy Kagetora	11:34

Final
A1	Naruki Doi and "brother" Yasshi	19:23
B1	Dragon Kid and Eita	Pin

=== 2023 ===
After a seven-year hiatus, a tag league was held from February 3 to March 2, 2023 under the revived name of Rey de Parejas. The league featured twelve teams in two blocks of six, with the top-two scoring teams of each block advancing to a single-elimination bracket.

Final standings
Block A		Block B	
Kota Minoura and B×B Hulk	7	Shun Skywalker and Kai	8
Yuki Yoshioka and Madoka Kikuta	6	Susumu Mochizuki and Yasushi Kanda	6
H·Y·O and Ishin	5	Yamato and Naruki Doi	5
Jason Lee and Jacky "Funky" Kamei	5	Strong Machine J and Strong Machine F	5
Masaaki Mochizuki and Mochizuki Jr.	4	Dragon Kid and Dragon Dia	4
Yoshiki Kato and Kaito Nagano	3	Ben-K and Minorita	0

Block A	Minoura Hulk	Yoshioka Kikuta	M. Mochizuki Junior	Lee Kamei	Kato Nagano	H·Y·O Ishin
Minoura Hulk	—N/a	Draw (20:00)	Minoura; Hulk (13:25)	Lee; Kamei (9:38)	Minoura; Hulk (14:01)	Minoura; Hulk (18:13)
Yoshioka Kikuta	Draw (20:00)	—N/a	Yoshioka; Kikuta (13:17)	Lee; Kamei (19:23)	Yoshioka; Kikuta (10:58)	Draw (20:00)
M. Mochizuki Junior	Minoura; Hulk (13:25)	Yoshioka; Kikuta (13:17)	—N/a	Draw (20:00)	Draw (20:00)	M. Mochizuki; Junior (20:00)
Lee Kamei	Lee; Kamei (9:38)	Lee; Kamei (19:23)	Draw (20:00)	—N/a	Kato; Nagano (10:00)	H·Y·O; Ishin (17:41)
Kato Nagano	Minoura; Hulk (14:01)	Yoshioka; Kikuta (10:58)	Draw (20:00)	Kato; Nagano (10:00)	—N/a	H·Y·O; Ishin (8:37)
H·Y·O Ishin	Minoura; Hulk (18:13)	Draw (20:00)	M. Mochizuki; Junior (20:00)	H·Y·O; Ishin (17:41)	H·Y·O; Ishin (8:37)	—N/a
Block B	Yamato Doi	Kid Dia	S. Mochizuki Kanda	Ben-K Minorita	Machine J Machine F	Skywalker Kai
Yamato Doi	—N/a	Yamato; Doi (12:00)	Double; Countout (9:52)	Yamato; Doi (12:00)	Draw (20:00)	Skywalker; Kai (11:39)
Kid Dia	Yamato; Doi (12:00)	—N/a	S. Mochizuki; Kanda (13:48)	Kid; Dia (13:02)	Kid; Dia (9:56)	Skywalker; Kai (14:05)
S. Mochizuki Kanda	Double; Countout (9:52)	S. Mochizuki; Kanda (13:48)	—N/a	S. Mochizuki; Kanda (11:20)	S. Mochizuki; Kanda (11:07)	Skywalker; Kai (7:29)
Ben-K Minorita	Yamato; Doi (12:00)	Kid; Dia (13:02)	S. Mochizuki; Kanda (11:20)	—N/a	Machine J Machine F (4:24)	Skywalker; Kai (16:48)
Machine J Machine F	Draw (20:00)	Kid; Dia (9:56)	S. Mochizuki; Kanda (11:07)	Machine J Machine F (4:24)	—N/a	Machine J Machine F (11:57)
Skywalker Kai	Skywalker; Kai (11:39)	Skywalker; Kai (14:05)	Skywalker; Kai (7:29)	Skywalker; Kai (16:48)	Machine J Machine F (11:57)	—N/a

Semi-finals
B2	Susumu Mochizuki and Yasushi Kanda	Pin
A1	Kota Minoura and B×B Hulk	12:25
B1	Shun Skywalker and Kai	9:58
A2	Yuki Yoshioka and Madoka Kikuta	Pin

Final
B2	Susumu Mochizuki and Yasushi Kanda	22:54
A2	Yuki Yoshioka and Madoka Kikuta	Pin

=== 2024 ===
The 2024 Rey de Parejas was held from March 6 to April 10. It featured twelve teams in two blocks of six, with the top-two scoring teams of each block advancing to a single-elimination bracket.

Final standings
Block A		Block B	
Dragon Kid and Naruki Doi	8	Yamato and Susumu Mochizuki	7
Big Boss Shimizu and Strong Machine J	7	Luis Mante and Hyo	6
Toru Owashi and Shuji Kondo	5	Shun Skywalker and Ishin	5
Kai and Gianni Valletta	4	Kzy and U-T	4
Kota Minoura and Ben-K	1	Jason Lee and Jacky "Funky" Kamei	4
Mozuku Tominaga and Shuri Joe	1	Madoka Kikuta and Dragon Dia	4

Block A	Minoura Ben-K	Shimizu Machine	Kid Doi	Owashi Kondo	Kai Valletta	Tominaga Joe
Minoura Ben-K	—N/a	Shimizu; Machine (17:39)	Kid; Doi (15:01)	Owashi; Kondo (13:16)	Kai; Valletta (10:35)	Draw (20:00)
Shimizu Machine	Shimizu; Machine (17:39)	—N/a	Kid; Doi (12:13)	Draw (20:00)	Shimizu; Machine (12:47)	Shimizu; Machine (14:54)
Kid Doi	Kid; Doi (15:01)	Kid; Doi (12:13)	—N/a	Kid; Doi (13:30)	Kai; Valletta (4:51)	Kid; Doi (13:05)
Owashi Kondo	Owashi; Kondo (13:16)	Draw (20:00)	Kid; Doi (13:30)	—N/a	Double; Countout (5:25)	Owashi; Kondo (11:45)
Kai Valletta	Kai; Valletta (10:35)	Shimizu; Machine (12:47)	Kai; Valletta (4:51)	Double; Countout (5:25)	—N/a	Double; Countout (8:51)
Tominaga Joe	Draw (20:00)	Shimizu; Machine (14:54)	Kid; Doi (13:05)	Owashi; Kondo (11:45)	Double; Countout (8:51)	—N/a
Block B	Mante Hyo	Kikuta Dia	Kzy U-T	Lee Kamei	Yamato Mochizuki	Skywalker Kato
Mante Hyo	—N/a	Draw (20:00)	Mante; Hyo (16:02)	Lee; Kamei (19:23)	Draw (20:00)	Mante; Hyo (12:44)
Kikuta Dia	Draw (20:00)	—N/a	Kikuta; Dia (10:12)	Lee; Kamei (18:09)	Yamato; Mochizuki (19:23)	Draw (20:00)
Kzy U-T	Mante; Hyo (16:02)	Kikuta; Dia (10:12)	—N/a	Kzy; U-T (11:34)	Yamato; Mochizuki (18:40)	Kzy; U-T (16:59)
Lee Kamei	Lee; Kamei (19:23)	Lee; Kamei (18:09)	Kzy; U-T (11:34)	—N/a	Yamato; Mochizuki (16:30)	Skywalker; Ishin (16:51)
Yamato Mochizuki	Draw (20:00)	Yamato; Mochizuki (19:23)	Yamato; Mochizuki (18:40)	Yamato; Mochizuki (16:30)	—N/a	Skywalker; Ishin (15:56)
Skywalker Kato	Mante; Hyo (12:44)	Draw (20:00)	Kzy; U-T (16:59)	Skywalker; Ishin (16:51)	Skywalker; Ishin (15:56)	—N/a

Semi-finals
B1	Yamato and Susumu Mochizuki	Pin
A2	Big Boss Shimizu and Strong Machine J	9:54
A1	Dragon Kid and Naruki Doi	Pin
B2	Luis Mante and Hyo	10:46

Final
B1	Yamato and Susumu Mochizuki	21:44
A1	Dragon Kid and Naruki Doi	Pin

=== 2025 ===
The 2025 Rey de Parejas was held from March 2 to March 30. It featured twelve teams in two blocks of six, with the top-two scoring teams of each block advancing to a single-elimination bracket.

Final standings
Block A		Block B	
Jacky Kamei and Riiita	7	Hyo and Kuroshio Tokyo Japan	8
Kota Minoura and Jason Lee	6	Strong Machine J and Kzy	6
Ishin and Yoshiki Kato	5	Shun Skywalker and Homare	6
Susumu Yokosuka and Kagetora	5	Yamato and B×B Hulk	5
Yuki Yoshioka and Dragon Dia	3	Ben-K and Mochizuki Jr.	4
Ryu Fuda and Daiki Yanagiuchi	2	Masaaki Mochizuki and Akihiro Sahara	1

Block A	Yoshioka Dia	Yokosuka Kagetora	Kamei Riiita	Minoura Lee	Ishin Kato	Fuda Yanagiuchi
Yoshioka Dia	—N/a	Draw (20:00)	Kamei; Riita (14:58)	Minoura; Lee (17:20)	Double; Count Out (8:50)	Yoshioka; Dia (9:51)
Yokosuka Kagetora	Draw (20:00)	—N/a	Kamei; Riita (16:08)	Yokosuka; Kagetora (16:16)	Ishin; Kato (10:22)	Yokosuka; Kagetora (12:33)
Kamei Riiita	Kamei; Riita (14:58)	Kamei; Riita (16:08)	—N/a	Draw (20:00)	Ishin; Kato (8:35)	Kamei; Riita (12:04)
Minoura Lee	Minoura; Lee (17:20)	Yokosuka; Kagetora (16:16)	Draw (20:00)	—N/a	Draw (20:00)	Minoura; Lee (9:22)
Ishin Kato	Double; Count Out (8:50)	Ishin; Kato (10:22)	Ishin; Kato (8:35)	Draw (20:00)	—N/a	Fuda; Yanagiuchi (12:59)
Fuda Yanagiuchi	Yoshioka; Dia (9:51)	Yokosuka; Kagetora (12:33)	Kamei; Riita (12:04)	Minoura; Lee (9:22)	Fuda; Yanagiuchi (12:59)	—N/a
Block B	Yamato Hulk	Machine Kzy	Hyo Kuroshio	Ben-K Junior	Mochizuki Sahara	Skywalker Homare
Yamato Hulk	—N/a	Yamato; Hulk (15:51)	Yamato; Hulk (11:46)	Ben-K; Junior (15:01)	Draw (20:00)	Skywalker; Homare (9:11)
Machine Kzy	Yamato; Hulk (15:51)	—N/a	Hyo; Kuroshio (13:40)	Machine; Kzy (14:58)	Machine; Kzy (10:28)	Machine; Kzy (Forfeit)
Hyo Kuroshio	Yamato; Hulk (11:46)	Hyo; Kuroshio (13:40)	—N/a	Hyo; Kuroshio (12:17)	Hyo; Kuroshio (10:07)	Hyo; Kuroshio (10:52)
Ben-K Junior	Ben-K; Junior (15:01)	Machine; Kzy (14:58)	Hyo; Kuroshio (12:17)	—N/a	Ben-K; Junior (11:55)	Skywalker; Homare (14:11)
Mochizuki Sahara	Draw (20:00)	Machine; Kzy (10:28)	Hyo; Kuroshio (10:07)	Ben-K; Junior (11:55)	—N/a	Skywalker; Homare (12:11)
Skywalker Homare	Skywalker; Homare (9:11)	Machine; Kzy (Forfeit)	Hyo; Kuroshio (10:52)	Skywalker; Homare (14:11)	Skywalker; Homare (12:11)	—N/a

Decision
B2	Strong Machine J and Kzy	7:08
B3	Shun Skywalker and Homare	Pin

Semi-finals
A1	Jacky Kamei and Riiita	14:31
B2	Shun Skywalker and Homare	Pin
B1	Hyo and Kuroshio Tokyo Japan	10:54
A2	Kota Minoura and Jason Lee	Pin

Final
B2	Shun Skywalker and Homare	Pin
A2	Kota Minoura and Jason Lee	23:46

=== 2026 ===
The 2026 Rey de Parejas took place between August 4 and September 3. It featured twelve teams in two blocks of six, with the top-two scoring teams of each block advancing to a single-elimination bracket.

Final standings
Block A		Block B	
Susumu Yokosuka and Kagetora	7	Yuki Yoshioka and Kota Minoura	10
Ishin and Yoshiki Kato	6	El Cielo and Luis Mante	8
Jacky Kamei and Riiita	5	Flamita and Sangre Azteca Jr.	6
Strong Machine J and Leona	4	Homare and Kazuma Kimura	4
Genki Horiguchi and Yasushi Kanda	4	GuC and @Key	2
Hyo and Gianni "Myon Myon" Valletta	2	Madoka Kikuta and Jason Lee	0

Block A	Kamei Riiita	Yokosuka Kagetora	Hyo Valletta	Machine Leona	Horiguchi Kanda	Ishin Kato
Kamei Riiita	—N/a	Draw (20:00)	Double; Count Out (9:59)	Kamei; Riiita (17:13)	Kamei; Riiita (11:27)	Ishin; Kato (11:48)
Yokosuka Kagetora	Draw (20:00)	—N/a	Yokosuka; Kagetora (14:27)	Machine; Leona (11:26)	Yokosuka; Kagetora (9:18)	Yokosuka; Kagetora (14:42)
Hyo Valletta	Double; Count Out (9:59)	Yokosuka; Kagetora (14:27)	—N/a	Machine; Leona (10:55)	Horiguchi; Kanda (3:24)	Hyo; Valletta (10:31)
Machine Leona	Kamei; Riiita (17:13)	Machine; Leona (11:26)	Machine; Leona (10:55)	—N/a	Horiguchi; Kanda (12:55)	Ishin; Kato (10:55)
Horiguchi Kanda	Kamei; Riiita (11:27)	Yokosuka; Kagetora (9:18)	Horiguchi; Kanda (3:24)	Horiguchi; Kanda (12:55)	—N/a	Ishin; Kato (13:20)
Ishin Kato	Ishin; Kato (11:48)	Yokosuka; Kagetora (14:42)	Hyo; Valletta (10:31)	Ishin; Kato (10:55)	Ishin; Kato (13:20)	—N/a
Block B	Yoshioka Minoura	Cielo Mante	Flamita Azteca	Homare Kimura	GuC @Key	Kikuta Lee
Yoshioka Minoura	—N/a	Yoshioka; Minoura (10:53)	Yoshioka; Minoura (14:05)	Yoshioka; Minoura (18:19)	Yoshioka; Minoura (13:59)	Yoshioka; Minoura (13:40)
Cielo Mante	Yoshioka; Minoura (10:53)	—N/a	Cielo; Mante (12:40)	Cielo; Mante (09:39)	Cielo; Mante (Forfeit)	Cielo; Mante (12:40)
Flamita Azteca	Yoshioka; Minoura (14:05)	Cielo; Mante (12:40)	—N/a	Flamita; Azteca (14:12)	Flamita; Azteca (11:15)	Flamita; Azteca (12:20)
Homare Kimura	Yoshioka; Minoura (18:19)	Cielo; Mante (09:39)	Flamita; Azteca (14:12)	—N/a	GuC @Key (12:30)	Homare; Kimura (12:41)
GuC @Key	Yoshioka; Minoura (13:59)	Cielo; Mante (Forfeit)	Flamita; Azteca (11:15)	GuC @Key (12:30)	—N/a	GuC @Key (10:48)
Kikuta Lee	Yoshioka; Minoura (13:40)	Cielo; Mante (12:40)	Flamita; Azteca (12:20)	Homare; Kimura (12:41)	GuC @Key (10:48)	—N/a

Semi-finals
B1	El Cielo and Luis Mante	Pin
A2	Kagetora and Susumu Yokosuka	10:53
A1	Ishin and Yoshiki Kato	11:43
B2	Kota Minoura and Yuki Yoshioka	Pin

Final
El Cielo and Luis Mante	Pin
Kota Minoura and Yuki Yoshioka	19:04

== See also ==
- Global Tag League
- Saikyo Tag League
- Ultimate Tag League
- World's Strongest Tag Determination League
- World Tag League
- Dragongate
- Professional wrestling in Japan
