= International Light Heavyweight Championship =

Professional wrestling championship

Details
- Promotion: Toryumon 2000 Project
- Date established: March 3, 2002
- Date retired: May 6, 2003

Other name
- NWA International Light Heavyweight Championship
Statistics
- First champion: Milano Collection A. T.
- Final champion: Cima
- Longest reign: Milano Collection A. T. (298 days)
- Shortest reign: Cima (131 days)

The International Light Heavyweight Championship (Japanese: インターナショナルライトヘビー級王座, Hepburn: Intānashonaru Raito Hebī-kyū Ōza) was a professional wrestling championship promoted by Último Dragón's Toryumon 2000 Project (T2P) promotion. Title matches were fought under "Lucha Libre Classica" rules.

== History ==
On January 23, 2002, at Desembarcamiento II, Toryumon President Último Dragón announced the T2P Strongest Merit Assessment League (実力査定リーグ戦, Jitsuryoku Satei Rīgusen; also known as the T2P Lucha Libre Classica League), a 12-man round-robin tournament that would crown the first International Light Heavyweight Champion. The tournament opened on February 17 at a Toryumon Mexico show, then resumed in T2P between February 27 and March 3. Milano Collection A. T. defeated Masato Yoshino in the final to win the tournament and become the inaugural champion.

T2P closed a month after Cima won the title, so Cima took the title to Toryumon Japan but never defended it. The title was later abandoned when Cima won the Último Dragón Gym Championship.

=== Strongest Merit Assessment League ===
The tournament featured 12 participants divided into four blocks of three. In Block B, Shuji Kondo and Toru Owashi finished tied at 3 points, while in Block C, all three participants finished tied at 2 points. Kondo won a playoff match against Owashi, and Anthony W. Mori defeated Stevie "brother" Tsujimoto and Takayuki Yagi in a three-way playoff match to qualify to the semifinals.

Final standings
Block A		Block B		Block C		Block D	
Milano Collection A. T.	4	Shuji Kondo	3	Anthony W. Mori	2	Masato Yoshino	4
Second Doi	2	Toru Owashi	3	Stevie "brother" Tsujimoto	2	Jun Ogawauchi	2
Raimu Mishima	0	Noriaki Kawabata	0	Takayuki Yagi	2	Kinya Oyanagi	0

Block A	Doi	Milano	Mishima	Block B	Kawabata	Kondo	Owashi
Doi	—N/a	Milano (10:13)	Doi (15:00)	Kawabata	—N/a	Kondo (4:43)	Owashi (7:01)
Milano	Milano (10:13)	—N/a	Milano (0:51)	Kondo	Kondo (4:43)	—N/a	Draw (20:00)
Mishima	Doi (15:00)	Milano (0:51)	—N/a	Owashi	Owashi (7:01)	Draw (20:00)	—N/a
Block C	Mori	Tsujimoto	Yagi	Block D	Ogawauchi	Oyanagi	Yoshino
Mori	—N/a	Mori (10:15)	Yagi (15:00)	Ogawauchi	—N/a	Ogawauchi (10:31)	Yoshino (8:34)
Tsujimoto	Mori (10:15)	—N/a	Tsujimoto (12:05)	Oyanagi	Ogawauchi (10:31)	—N/a	Yoshino (10:13)
Yagi	Yagi (15:00)	Tsujimoto (12:05)	—N/a	Yoshino	Yoshino (8:34)	Yoshino (10:13)	—N/a

Semifinals
A1	Milano Collection A. T.	Sub
B1	Shuji Kondo	0:59
C1	Anthony W. Mori	8:31
D1	Masato Yoshino	Sub

Final
A1	Milano Collection A. T.	Sub
D1	Masato Yoshino	10:13

== Reigns ==
Key
No.	Overall reign number
Reign	Reign number for the specific champion
Days	Number of days held
Defenses	Number of successful defenses

No.	Champion	Championship change			Reign statistics			Notes	Ref.
No.	Champion	Date	Event	Location	Reign	Days	Defenses	Notes	Ref.
1	Milano Collection A. T.	March 3, 2002	Strongest Merit Assessment League Finals	Tokyo, Japan	1	298	1	Defeated Masato Yoshino in the Strongest Merit Assessment League final to win the inaugural title.	
2	Cima	December 26, 2002	La Ultima Caida	Tokyo, Japan	1	131	0		
—	Deactivated	May 6, 2003	—	—	—	—	—	Deactivated after Cima won the Último Dragón Gym Championship.	

== See also ==
- Toryumon
- Último Dragón Gym Championship
