= Jun Ogawauchi =

Japanese professional wrestler

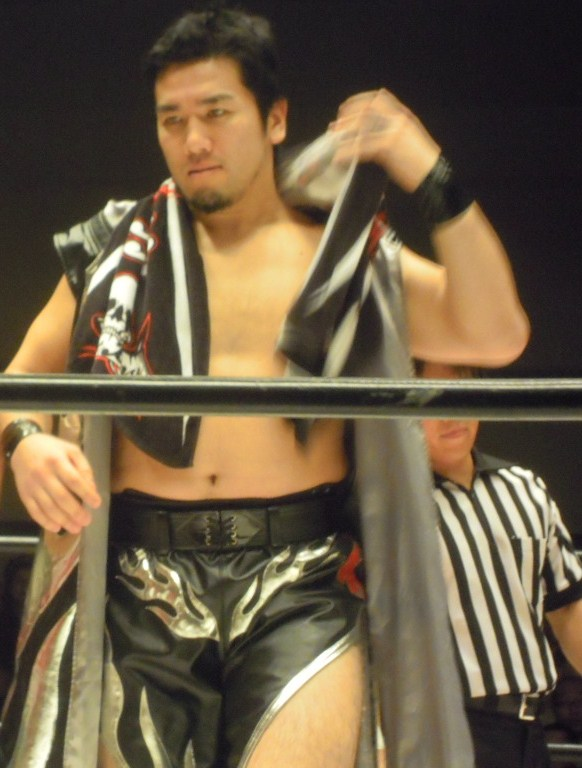

Personal information
- Born: January 11, 1979

Professional wrestling career
- Ring name(s): Jun Ogawauchi; JUN
- Trained by: Jorge "Skayde" Rivera, Último Dragón
- Debut: May 18, 2001

Jun Ogawauchi (小川内 潤, Ogawauchi Jun; born January 11, 1979), also known as JUN, is a Japanese professional wrestler and former Japanese professional wrestling ring announcer, working for the Pro Wrestling Secret Base. Ogawauchi's greatest fame came as the fifth member of the Crazy Max stable in Toryumon.

== Career ==
=== Toryumon (2001–2004) ===
Jun Ogawauchi debuted as a member of the T2P project, a particular branch of the Toryumon system led by Último Dragón, wrestling his early career in Mexico. He began to make appearances in Toryumon Japan in 2002 alongside classmate Shuji Kondo, but Kondo was clearly considered to be of a higher rank to Ogawauchi. This would be a theme of Ogawauchi's career for many years, with him suffering in the shadow of his peers. He struggled through a few injuries once he came to Toryumon Japan on a permanent basis and also impressed on the last T2P show with his performance against T2P monster Toru Owashi.

Ogawauchi received his biggest break in 2003. Crazy Max, arguably the greatest stable in Dragon System history, declared they were looking for a new member. However, fans were shocked when Takamichi Iwasa, who had been appealing to become the 5th member, was denied the spot, and the place was actually given to the rookie Ogawauchi on May 11, 2003, who was renamed to simply JUN. After a slow start where he struggled to gain acceptance, an impressive performance in the 2003 Rey de Parejas lead to an increase in his charisma and alterations in his ring style to fit in with his new team-mates. These alterations were rewarded when he defeated Shuji Condo for the British Commonwealth Junior Heavyweight Championship. He is the last person to date to have held that particular title, as the title was vacated on November 10, 2003 and has not been revived since. However, disaster struck in December when he suffered an injury during a match against "brother" Yasshi. Rumours also circulated that his injury had been worsened during a Crazy Max trip to South Korea. This was bad news, as Cima himself had declared that 2004 would be a renaissance year for Crazy Max.

Ogawauchi retired from active professional wrestling in February 2004, tearfully citing herniated cervical vertebrae which were causing numbness in his left arm. His final match was a tag team match on February 26, 2004 alongside his Crazy Max mentor Cima in a loss to the Aagan Issou team of Shuji Kondo and "brother" Yasshi. Following the loss, Ogawauchi took the microphone and told his Crazy Max team-mates how much he loved them. Don Fujii then helped him to climb up the corner of the ring and pose for one last time, and Cima carried him out on his back. In an interesting note, they never played the 10 bell salute for Ogawauchi, a custom for leaving wrestlers, suggesting there was a glimmer of hope for a return.

=== Dragondoor and El Dorado (2005–2008) ===
Ogawauchi resurfaced on July 19, 2005 on the debut show of Dragondoor Project, reuniting with several of his T2P classmates on the show, such as Toru Owashi, Shuji Kondo and Milano Collection AT. Still firmly retired, Ogawauchi worked as the ring announcer for the promotion. Jun was not the only T2P star to resurface for the promotion, as he was joined by Mototsugu Shimizu, Kinya Oyanagi and Venezia.

When Dragondoor ended in early 2006, Ogawauchi moved on to the followup promotion Pro Wrestling El Dorado set up by Dragondoor owner Noriaki Kawabata. To fit with the El Dorado theme, Ogawauchi has taken to dressing as a pirate for his ring announcing duties, donning a look reminiscent of Jack Sparrow. El Dorado ceased operations in December 2008 due to dwindling fan interest caused by the departure of the Aagan Iisou stable.

=== Pro Wrestling Secret Base (2009–present) ===
Following El Dorado's closure, several former members formed Pro Wrestling Secret Base, a small scale continuation of El Dorado wrestling out of Chofu. Initially working as a ring announcer, Ogawauchi made a return to the ring after five years on October 20, 2009. He teamed with Masa Takanashi against Kinya Oyanagi and Satoshi Kajiwara. Though Ogawauchi was pinned by Oyanagi, it marked the beginning of his return to full-time active wrestling. Ogawauchi continues to wrestle for Secret Base as a member of the promotion's home army, regularly teaming with Mototsugu Shimizu. Since returning, he has wrestled most notably for Big Japan Pro Wrestling and New Japan Pro-Wrestling's NEVER series. On May 4, 2015, Ogawauchi defeated Go to win the Captain of the Secret Base Openweight Championship, losing the title to Mototsugu Shimizu on September 9.

== Championships and accomplishments ==
- Guts World Pro Wrestling
  - GWC Tag Team Championship (1 time) - with Chango
- Pro Wrestling Secret Base
  - Captain of the Secret Base Openweight Championship (1 time)
  - Secret Base Six Man Tag Team Tournament (2011) – with Ken45º & Kinya Oyanagi
- Toryumon
  - British Commonwealth Junior Heavyweight Championship (1 time)
