= Magnum Tokyo =

Japanese professional wrestler (born 1973)

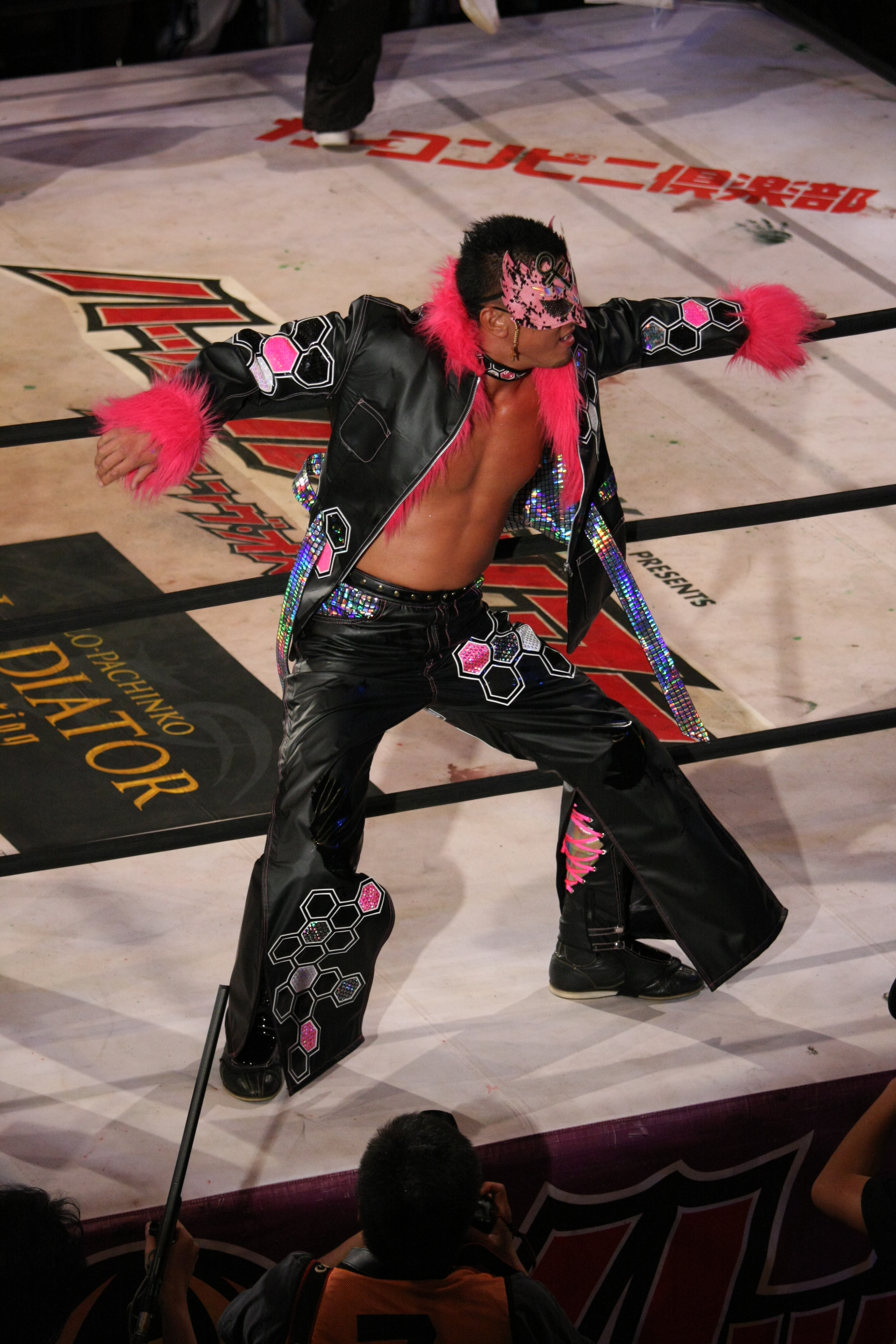
- Magnum Tokyo in 2009

Personal information
- Born: Katsumasa Kuroki (黒木克正, Kuroki Katsumasa); January 9, 1973 (age 53) Nerima-ku, Tokyo, Japan

Professional wrestling career
- Ring name(s): Detective Alan Kuroki; Tokyo Magnum; Magnum Tokyo
- Billed height: 1.85 m (6 ft 1 in)
- Billed weight: 85 kg (187 lb)
- Billed from: Tokyo, Japan
- Trained by: Último Dragón
- Debut: May 11, 1997
- Retired: October 10, 2009 (final match)

Katsumasa Kuroki (黒木克正, Kuroki Katsumasa; born January 9, 1973) is a Japanese professional wrestler, better known by his ring name Magnum Tokyo (マグナムTOKYO, Magunamu Tōkyō). Most closely associated with the now-defunct Toryumon Japan, he also competed for World Championship Wrestling, HUSTLE professional wrestling promotion and Dragon Gate as Tokyo Magnum and Magnum Tokyo.

Magnum debuted in 1997 and become popular in Japan for both his high-flying junior-heavyweight style (a style common amongst students of Último Dragón) and his elaborate entrances, which included dancing through the crowd and dance sequences in the ring with his own dance troupe. His character was immensely popular with women, and was instrumental in building a large female fanbase in Toryumon's early years.

Kuroki initially retired in 2007 after a persistent eye injury, but briefly returned two years later for the Hustle promotion before retiring again in late 2009. Currently, Kuroki works as a Daido-juku Kudo trainer in both Japan and Colombia.

== Professional wrestling career ==
=== Early career ===
Magnum Tokyo was a popular mainstay in Japan's Dragon Gate promotion. He was trained by Último Dragón and graduated from Dragon's "Toryumon Gym" in 1997, making his professional wrestling debut on May 11, 1997 by defeating fellow débutante Nobuhiko Oshima. After his first match he would change his name to Magnum Tokyo, adopting the gimmick of a male stripper (with his name being a reference to AV actor Magnum Hokuto). He used to dance his way to the ring, wearing elaborate costumes and eye-masks, and stripped from them before the matches, sometimes with women in the crowd actually stuffing money into his tights. He would also make appearances for Consejo Mundial de Lucha Libre and International Wrestling Revolution Group. Magnum defeated Tony Rivera in the final of the Young Dragons Cup 1997. On July 5, he defeated El Hijo del Gladiador for the IWRG Intercontinental Middleweight Championship and held it for three months before losing it to Mr. Niebla.

=== World Championship Wrestling (1998) ===
Less than a year into his professional career, he gained some mainstream notoriety in North America with World Championship Wrestling in early and mid-1998. While there, he participated in a brief program wherein he wanted to become a member of The Dancing Fools, (a tag team consisting of Disco Inferno and Alex Wright), and would appear dancing behind them (without their knowledge) during their entrance. The program came to a head when his interference backfired in a tag team match between The Dancing Fools and The Public Enemy at the 1998 Road Wild pay-per-view. Two nights later on the August 10 episode of Nitro, he was told by Wright and Disco Inferno that if he wanted to be a member of The Dancing Fools, he needed to impress them in a match against Eddie Guerrero. He lost the match in under two minutes, and the match was his last appearance with the company until he returned briefly in October and November of that same year. During those two months, he appeared sporadically in squash matches and as a participant in the annual World War 3 battle royal on November 22, 1998. One night later (on the November 23 episode of Nitro) he made his final televised appearance on Nitro in a loss against Kanyon. He then appeared on Saturday Night on December 5, 1998 in a segment with Barry Darsow where he got laid out.

=== Toryumon/Dragon Gate (1999–2006) ===
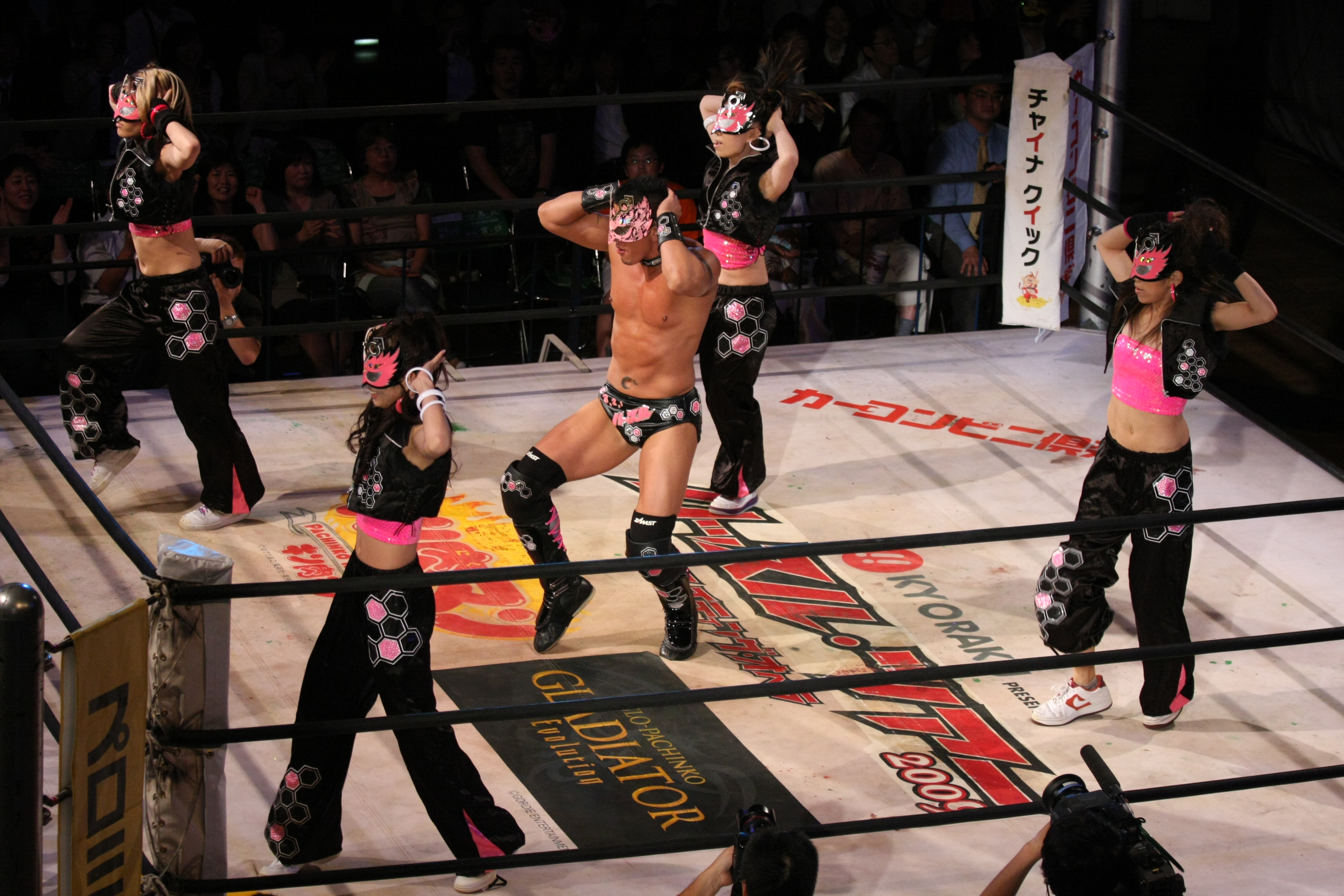
Magnum TOKYO (center) and dancers during his ring entrance.

Magnum returned to Japan and made his debut for Toryumon Japan on January 31, 1999. Magnum participated in the NWA World Middleweight Title Tournament but lost in the finals to SASUKE. During his early years in Toryumon he would align himself with wrestlers such as Dragon Kid and Kenichiro Arai to combat the factions of Crazy MAX and M2K. In March and April 2001, Magnum took part in El Numero Uno and was placed into block A. With three points he progressed to the semi-final and then eventually the final which took place on April 4. In the final he took on M2K leader Masaaki Mochizuki where the match would end in a double count out, therefore the match would restart and this time Mochizuki would come out on top. On July 1, 2001 he defeated Mochizuki for the British Commonwealth Junior Heavyweight Championship and on August 14, he, Dragon Kid and Ryo Saito won the UWA World Trios Championship from Crazy MAX. On October 28, the trio lost the title to M2K. On March 15, 2002, Magnum lost the British Commonwealth Junior Heavyweight Championship to SUWA. In 2002's El Numero Uno, Magnum would this time defeat Mochizuki. In a shocking turn of events, on May 19, Magnum joined M2K and became their leader, on that night he teamed up with Mochizuki in a one night tag team tournament where they were defeated by Crazy MAX. On September 8, Darkness Dragon was kicked out of M2K and went on to form Do Fixer with Dragon Kid and Ryo Saito. On October 28, Magnum dissolved M2K and announced that he and the remnants of M2K were the real Do FIXER, and that Darkness Dragon – now renamed K-ness – was still a member of the group and was sent into the home army (Seikigun) to cause problems within it. It worked in that Ryo Saito was not welcomed back into Seikigun, but Dragon Kid, however, was. In El Numero Uno 2003, Magnum only reached the quarter-finals before losing to Genki Horiguchi. On June 29, Magnum defeated CIMA for the Último Dragón Gym Championship and would lose it to SUWA on February 8, 2004. From the end of 2003, there were problems between Magnum and the remaining stable members again and again and on March 27, 2005, Magnum appointed Ryo Saito as the new leader. On March 28, Magnum joined PoS.HEARTS but was still considered a member of Do FIXER. Magnums first title shot since Toryumon became Dragon Gate came on May 1, for the Open the Triangle Gate Championship against Do FIXER. Magnum took part in King Of Gate 2005 but was eliminated in the first round by Masaaki Mochizuki. Magnum would leave PoS.HEARTS and formed a new stable called Renaissance and was still considered a member of Do FIXER.

=== Retirement ===
On August 26, 2006, Magnum and Mochizuki took part in the Dragon Gate I-J Heavyweight Tag Team Championship tournament and during the second round match up involving Don Fujii and Yasushi Kanda, although they won the match, Magnum's career was put into jeopardy after he suffered a very serious eye injury. After being out for seven months with little to no improvement to the condition of his eye, TOKYO announced his retirement in April 2007.

=== Hustle (2008–2009) ===
On November 20, 2008, Magnum returned to professional wrestling, appearing under a new gimmick, Detective Alan Kuroki, at a Hustle event in Tokyo, Japan. He wrestled his return match for HUSTLE on November 22, 2008. On March 25, 2009, he announced he would be returning to his Magnum Tokyo gimmick. After returning as Magnum Tokyo he would team up with TAJIRI. Magnum appeared at Hustle Jihad 2009 where he teamed with Akira Shoji, Rene Dupree, Shiro Koshinaka and Toshiaki Kawada and lost to Genichiro Tenryu, King RIKI, Riki Choshu, Wataru Sakata and Yoshihiro Takayama. Since the closure of HUSTLE, Magnum has stayed away from wrestling and is presumed retired.

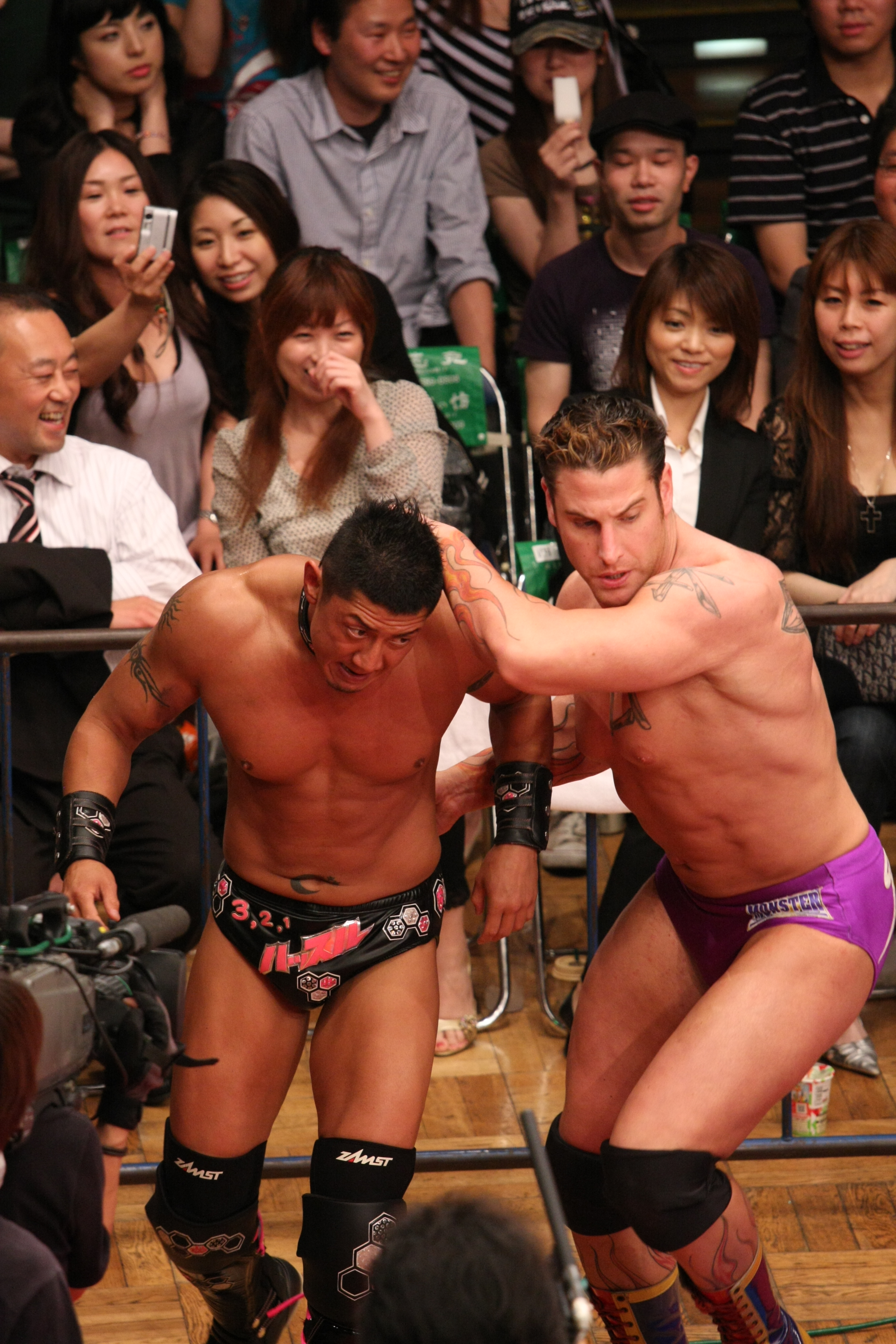
Magnum TOKYO wrestling against René Bonaparte in 2009.

== Championships and accomplishments ==
- International Wrestling Revolution Group
  - IWRG Intercontinental Middleweight Championship (1 time)
  - Copa Higher Power (1998) – with Judo Suwa, Lyguila, Ryo Saito, Shiima Nobunaga, Sumo Fujii and Último Dragón
- Michinoku Pro Wrestling
  - British Commonwealth Junior Heavyweight Championship (1 time)
- Pro Wrestling Illustrated
  - PWI ranked him #44 of the best 500 singles wrestlers in the PWI 500 in 2001
- Toryumon
  - Último Dragón Gym Championship (1 time)
  - UWA World Trios Championship (1 time) – with Dragon Kid & Ryo Saito
  - El Número Uno League (2002)
  - Young Dragons Cup (1997)

=== Luchas de Apuestas record ===
Winner (wager)	Loser (wager)	Location	Event	Date	Notes
Masaaki Mochizuki (hair)	Magnum TOKYO (hair)	Osaka, Japan	Live event	September 30, 2001	(Note: This was a five-way steel cage match, which also included CIMA, Darkness Dragon and Dragon Kid.)
