= Toryumon (Último Dragón) =

Japanese professional wrestling promotion

- Founded: May 11, 1997 (Toryumon Mexico); January 31, 1999 (Toryumon Japan); November 13, 2001 (Toryumon 2000 Project); August 22, 2003 (Toryumon X)
- Defunct: January 27, 2003 (Toryumon 2000 Project); July 4, 2004 (Toryumon Japan); September 9, 2004 (Toryumon X); March 2020 (Toryumon Mexico)
- Style: Lucha libre Puroresu; Sports entertainment
- Headquarters: Tokyo, Japan; Naucalpan, Mexico
- Founder: Último Dragón
- Owner: Último Dragón
- Parent: Último Dragón Gym
- Successor: To Toryumon Japan: Dragon Gate; To Toryumon X: Dragondoor; To Toryumon Mexico: Toryumon Casa

Toryumon (闘龍門, Tōryūmon) is the name of several professional wrestling promotions that have operated in Japan and Mexico. The promotions were owned and operated by Yoshihiro Asai, who is best known under the ring name Último Dragón. Toryumon is a coined word that means Fighting Dragon Gate. The word was derived from the homonym Tōryūmon (登龍門) that literally means climbing up the dragon gate (or less literally climbing up the gateway to success). The Toryumon Mexico promotion was originally created to give graduates of the Último Dragón Gym a promotion to gain their initial in-ring experience in. Its Japan-based sister promotion Toryumon Japan developed a major cult following and grew into becoming one of the hottest independent promotions in the country. The promotion would run for five years. On July 4, 2004, Último Dragón left the promotion and took the name and trademarks with him. Toryumon Japan's wrestlers and officials decided to form a new promotion, adopting the name Dragon Gate (later Dragongate) and continuing in the traditions of Toryumon. Since then Último Dragón would continue to promote Toryumon events mainly in Mexico but also has occasionally held shows in Japan until 2020 when he signed with Dragongate.

== History ==
During his time working for World Championship Wrestling (WCW) in the United States Japanese wrestler Último Dragón decided to open up a wrestling school in Naucalpan, Mexico to give Japanese hopefuls the chance to learn the Mexican lucha libre style like Dragón had. The wrestling school operated after the same principles of a university, divided into classes with several terms where wrestlers would "graduate" (debut) at the same time. The Ultimo Dragon Gym's first graduating term consisted of Cima, Don Fujii, Dragon Kid, Magnum Tokyo and Suwa who collectively became known as Toryumon Japan (a name that would be used for the first four terms). Toryumon promoted their first show on May 11, 1997, in Naucalpan on a show that was co-promoted with International Wrestling Revolution Group (IWRG). Toryumon and IWRG would co-promote shows in Japan from 1997 until 2001, allowing the Ultimo Dragon Gym graduates to work on IWRG shows and even saw several graduates wrestlers win IWRG Championship. Through his contacts with WCW Último Dragón also arranged for some of his first term graduates to wrestle on World Championship Wrestling shows. On January 1, 1999, Toryumon held its first show in Japan and from that point forward began promoting regular shows in Japan. Toryumon's combination of traditional Japanese puroresu, Mexican lucha libre and elements of sports entertainment that Último Dragón had observed while working for WCW such as outside interference and referee's being knocked out, something that at the time was not traditionally used in Japanese wrestling. The second class of Último Dragón Gym graduates began their own promotion, called the Toryumon 2000 Project, or T2P for short. The T2P promotion debuted on November 13, 2001, and became known for their use of the six-sided wrestling ring, the first promotion to regularly use such a ring shape. T2P wrestlers primarily used a submission based style called Llave (Spanish for "Key" the lucha libre term for submission locks). T2P ran until January 27, 2003, when the roster was absorbed into Toryumon. The third graduating class was known as "Toryumon X" and like T2P also started their own promotion under their class name. Toryumon X made its debut on August 22, 2003, and lasted until early 2004.

Último Dragón had been forced to retire from active competition in 1998 after a mistake during an elbow surgery that caused nerve damage. In 2001 Dragón had another round of surgery on his elbow, restoring mobility and feeling. Following his rehabilitation Último Dragón made his return to active wrestling on a Toryumon / T2P co-promoted pay-per-view on September 8, 2002. In the following months Dragón wrestled regularly for Toryumon and various companies around the world. Because of his active scheduled Último Dragón stepped down as the director of Toryumon leaving the job to Takashi Okamura. Okamura handled the job while Dragón began working full-time for World Wrestling Entertainment (WWE) in the United States. After his run with WWE ended Dragón returned to Japan and announced that he was leaving Toryumon and taking all the trademarks he owned with him. Toryumon Japan changed its name to Dragon Gate as a result of this, continuing the traditions of Toryumon Japan including references to Último Dragón. Since the break Toryumon has primarily promoted shows in Mexico, featuring students trained by Dragón and Jorge "Skayde" Rivera and a number of wrestlers from various Mexican and American promotions.

In Japan a group of remaining Toryumon students, including ousted members of Dragon Gate, joined with the internet-firm Livedoor to create the promotion Dragondoor, a promotion that only ran six shows.

In 2020, Toryumon Mexico would quietly close its doors with Dragón later founding Toryumon Casa in 2022, as base to serve as the home promotion for Japanese wrestlers from Dragongate and Pro Wrestling Noah who had been sent on learning excursions in Mexico.

== Shows and events ==
Toryumon Japan ran a series of PPVs under the names Vamonos Amigos ("Let's go friends" in Spanish) and "Revolucion" ("Revolution") as well as an annual anniversary show. They also held an annual Numero Uno League that became one of the highlights of the promotional year. Since the split in 2004 Toryumon has not promoted any major shows or PPVs, focusing their promotional efforts on Toryumon Mexico. In Mexico Dragón promoted an annual DragonMania show, with the last being DragonMania XI held on May 28, 2016. In August 2017 Toryumon Mexico started working with All Japan Pro Wrestling in with a collaborated event tour called Lucha Fiesta.

== Championships promoted ==
Before the Dragon Gate split in 2004 Toryumon Japan promoted a series of championships, only one of which originated in the promotion, Último Dragón Gym Championship, the rest were either bought from its previous owner or acquired after promotions closed. When the promotion turned to Dragon Gate all its championships were vacated, leaving only the Toryumon Mexico promoted titles.

Championship	Last champion(s)	Reign	Date retired	Notes
UWA World Trios Championship	Aagan Iisou (Shuji Kondo, Takuya Sugawara and Toru Owashi)	1 (6, 3, 4)	—	Dormant ever since Aagan Iisou won the vacant title in Pro-Wrestling Basara on October 24, 2021; status unclear.
NWA World Welterweight Championship	Akantus	1	September 30, 2017	Revived in 1999 following the dissolution of the J-Crown. Briefly moved to Osaka Pro Wrestling in early 2007, then to Consejo Mundial de Lucha Libre (CMLL) before returning to NWA until the promotion was purchased by Lighting One, Inc.
NWA International Junior Heavyweight Championship	Último Dragón	2	March 16, 2014	Revived by Toryumon Mexico in 2007. Defended in Dradition between 2008 and 2009. Abandoned since Último Dragón's last defense in 2014.
UWA World Welterweight Championship	Takeshi Minamino	1	October 14, 2004	Promoted by Michinoku Pro Wrestling; abandoned in late 2004.
Último Dragón Gym Championship	Cima	1	July 5, 2004	Vacated after the Dragon Gate split and replaced with the Open the Dream Gate Championship.
British Commonwealth Junior Heavyweight Championship	Jun	1	December 7, 2003	Vacated after Jun's title defense against Second Doi was ruled a no contest. Remained inactive until the promotion closed.
International Light Heavyweight Championship	Cima	1	May 6, 2003	Defended in Toryumon 2000 Project (T2P). Retired after T2P closed and Cima won the Último Dragón Gym Championship.

== Annual tournaments ==
=== Suzuki Cup ===
Suzuki Cup is a Team Tournament that began in 2007

- 2007: Marco Corleone, Kensuke Sasaki and Ultimo Dragon
- 2008: Alex Koslov, Marco Corleone and Ultimo Dragon

=== Young Dragons Cup ===
Every year Toryumon Mexico holds the Young Dragons Cup, an annual tournament that began in 1997. The tournament is used to showcase Dragon Gym students. Originally it was a traditional single-elimination tournament, in 2006 it was changed into a torneo cibernetico and has had that format ever since. Rocky Romero, Kota Ibushi, Ryuji Yamaguchi and Trauma II are the only tournament winners who were not actually trained by Último Dragón.

- 1997: Magnum Tokyo
- 1998: Genki Horiguchi
- 1999: Yasushi Kanda
- 2000: Milano Collection AT
- 2001: Toru Owashi
- 2002: Taiji Ishimori
- 2003: Takeshi Minamino
- 2004: Rocky Romero
- 2005: Kazuchika Okada
- 2006: Kota Ibushi
- 2007: Ryuji Yamaguchi
- 2008: Satoshi Kajiwara
- 2009: Trauma II
- 2010: Angélico

=== Yamaha Cup ===
Toryumon Mexico holds the Yamaha Cup about once a year, although there have been years without a Cup. The Yamaha Cup is a tag team tournament that features a mixture of Último Dragón trainees and a combination of wrestlers from the Mexican Independent circuit, IWRG and Consejo Mundial de Lucha Libre (CMLL).

- 2000: Susumu Mochizuki and Yasushi Kanda
- 2003: Taiji Ishimori and Shu Sato
- 2004: Mini Cima and SUWAcito
- 2005: Hiromi Horiguchi and Ryusuke Taguchi
- 2006: Johnny Stamboli and Chuck Palumbo
- 2008: Último Dragón and Yutaka Yoshie
- 2010: Angélico and El Hijo del Fantasma
- 2012: Angélico and Último Dragón

== Último Dragón Gym students ==
Toryumon graduates
Year	Term	Class	Name	Currently working
1997	1st Term	Toryumon Japan	Magnum Tokyo	Inactive
1997	1st Term	Toryumon Japan	Cima	Freelancer
1997	1st Term	Toryumon Japan	Suwa	Retired
1997	1st Term	Toryumon Japan	Don Fujii	Dragongate
1997	1st Term	Toryumon Japan	Dragon Kid	Dragongate
1998	2nd Term	Toryumon Japan	Yasushi Kanda	Dragongate
1998	2nd Term	Toryumon Japan	Genki Horiguchi	Dragongate
1998	2nd Term	Toryumon Japan	Kenichiro Arai	Dragongate
1998	2nd Term	Toryumon Japan	Stalker Ichikawa	Retired
1998	3rd Term	Toryumon Japan	Susumu Yokosuka	Dragongate
1999	4th Term	Toryumon Japan	Ryo Saito	Dragongate
2000	3rd Term	Toryumon Japan	Mototsugu Shimizu	Pro-Wrestling Secret Base
2000	5th Term	Toryumon 2000 Project	Taku Iwasa	Inactive
2000	5th Term	Toryumon 2000 Project	Raimu Mishima	Retired
2000	5th Term	Toryumon 2000 Project	Anthony W. Mori	Retired
2000	5th Term	Toryumon 2000 Project	Naruki Doi	Freelancer
2000	6th Term	Toryumon 2000 Project	Milano Collection A.T.	Retired
2000	6th Term	Toryumon 2000 Project	Philip J. Fukumasa	Retired
2000	6th Term	Toryumon 2000 Project	Takuya Murakami	Retired
2000	6th Term	Toryumon 2000 Project	Kinya Oyanagi	Retired
2000	6th Term	Toryumon 2000 Project	Skayde Jr.	Pro-Wrestling Secret Base
2000	7th Term	Toryumon 2000 Project	Masato Yoshino	Retired
2000	7th Term	Toryumon 2000 Project	brother "Yasshi"	Dove Pro Wrestling; Kobe Meriken Pro-Wrestling
2000	7th Term	Toryumon 2000 Project	Toru Owashi	Freelancer
2000	7th Term	Toryumon 2000 Project	Shachihoko Machine #1	Retired
2000	7th Term	Toryumon 2000 Project	Shachihoko Boy	Dragongate
2001	7th Term	Toryumon 2000 Project	Takayuki Yagi	Dragongate
2001	8th Term	Toryumon 2000 Project	Shuji Kondo	Freelancer
2001	8th Term	Toryumon 2000 Project	Shogo Takagi	Semi-retired
2001	8th Term	Toryumon 2000 Project	Takuya Sugawara	Pro Wrestling Zero1
2001	8th Term	Toryumon 2000 Project	Jun Ogawauchi	Pro-Wrestling Secret Base
2002	Scout Caravan	Toryumon X	Hisamaru Tajima	Retired
2002	8th Term	Toryumon X	Akihiko Inoue	Retired
2002	9th Term	Toryumon X	Taiji Ishimori	New Japan Pro-Wrestling
2002	9th Term	Toryumon X	Takeshi Minamino	Freelancer
2002	9th Term	Toryumon X	Ken45°	Michinoku Pro Wrestling
2002	9th Term	Toryumon X	Manjimaru	Michinoku Pro Wrestling
2002	9th Term	Toryumon X	Lambo Miura	Retired
2002	9th Term	Toryumon X	Kagetora	Dragongate
2002	9th Term	Toryumon X	Rasse	Michinoku Pro Wrestling
2002	9th Term	Toryumon X	Taro Nohashi	Michinoku Pro Wrestling
2002	9th Term	Toryumon X	Brahman Shu	Freelancer
2002	9th Term	Toryumon X	Brahman Kei	Freelancer
2002	10th Term	Toryumon X	Naoki Tanizaki	Dove Pro Wrestling
2003	10th Term	Toryumon X	Bear Fukuda	Pro-Wrestling Secret Base
2003	11th Term	Toryumon X	Ferist	Pro-Wrestling Secret Base
2003	11th Term	Toryumon X	Saito Masuda	Retired
2003	11th Term	Toryumon X	Sugi	Freelancer
2003	12th Term	Toryumon X	Mentai☆Kid	Retired
2003	12th Term	Toryumon X	Spark Aoki	Freelancer
2003	12th Term	Toryumon X	Kondo & Co.	Retired
2003	12th Term	Toryumon X	Yasuhiko Dokan	Retired
2004	11th Term	Toryumon X	Amigo Suzuki	Freelancer
2004	13th Term	Toryumon X	Banana Senga	Freelancer
2004	13th Term	Toryumon X	Kazuchika Okada	All Elite Wrestling
2004	13th Term	Toryumon X	Hajime Ohara	Pro Wrestling Noah
2004	13th Term	Toryumon X	Hiromi Horiguchi	Retired
2004	13th Term	Toryumon X	Kanjyuro Matsuyama	Mass Pro-Wrestling Matsuyama-za
2004	13th Term	Toryumon X	Chango	Freelancer
2004	13th Term	Toryumon X	Tsutomu Oosugi	Freelancer
2004	14th Term	Toryumon Mexico	Pequeño Ninja	Retired
2006	14th Term	Toryumon Mexico	Hanaoka	Pro-Wrestling Secret Base
2006	14th Term	Toryumon Mexico	Satoshi Kajiwara	Retired

Other students
Name	From	Currently working
Takashi Okamura	Bukō Dojo	Retired/Deceased
Masaaki Mochizuki	Bukō Dojo	Dragongate
Taru	Bukō Dojo	Makai
Keiichi Kawano	Bukō Dojo	Retired
Noriaki Kawabata	Bukō Dojo	Inactive
Super Shisa	—	Freelancer
K-ness.	Michinoku Pro Wrestling	Retired

Students who didn't graduate
Term	Name	Currently working
4th Term	Kinta Tamaoka	Inactive
9th Term	Masahiro Takanashi	DDT Pro-Wrestling

== See also ==
- List of professional wrestling promotions in Mexico
- Universal Lucha Libre
- Michinoku Pro Wrestling
- WAR
