= Takahiro Suwa =

Japanese professional wrestler (born 1975)

Personal information
- Born: August 31, 1975 (age 50)

Professional wrestling career
- Ring name(s): Judo Suwa; Maybach Taniguchi Jr; Somusawa; Suwa
- Billed height: 1.70 m (5 ft 7 in)
- Billed weight: 82 kg (181 lb)
- Trained by: Último Dragón; Animal Hamaguchi
- Debut: May 11, 1997
- Retired: May 11, 2013

Takahiro Suwa (諏訪 高広, Suwa Takahiro), better known simply as Suwa (stylized in all capital letters), is a retired Japanese professional wrestler. He originally retired from professional wrestling in 2007, but later returned for a short period of time in 2013 as Maybach Taniguchi Jr before a cervical spine injury forced him to retire once again.

== Professional wrestling career ==
=== Toryumon and Dragon Gate ===
Suwa, one of Último Dragón's first trainees, made his professional wrestling debut on the first card of Dragon's Toryumon promotion on May 11, 1997. He went on to become one of the founding fathers of the Crazy Max faction along with Cima, Taru, and Don Fujii, being portraited as a cocky and aggressive villain. Suwa won the Último Dragón Gym Championship, the promotion's top title, from Magnum Tokyo on February 8, 2004. He held it for two months before a shoulder injury suffered in a match with Dragon Kid forced him to vacate the belt. Later that same year, Suwa signed with Pro Wrestling Noah.

=== Pro Wrestling Noah ===
Soon after his arrival in Noah, on September 18, 2005, he challenged Kenta for the GHC Junior Heavyweight Championship. Suwa was originally disqualified for attacking Kenta with a foreign object, but the match was restarted, and Suwa eventually lost.

On December 10, 2006, Suwa teamed with Taru, Shuji Kondo and brother YASSHI during an eight man tag team match against Akira Taue, Mushiking Terry, Atsushi Aoki and Taiji Ishimori. After his team lost the match, Suwa announced his intention to retire from wrestling. In his last match, on January 21, 2007, he teamed up with Yoshihiro Takayama and Minoru Suzuki, losing to Kenta, Naomichi Marufuji and Takeshi Rikio. During the match, Suwa turned on his partners. Suwa retired from professional wrestling on March 11, 2007.

In January 2013, Suwa returned to Noah under a mask as "Maybach Taniguchi, Jr.", a junior version of Maybach Taniguchi and a member of No Mercy. However, when Taniguchi turned on No Mercy leader Kenta on February 9, Taniguchi, Jr. did not follow him, but instead remained loyal to No Mercy. On March 10, Taniguchi, Jr. and No Mercy stablemate Genba Hirayanagi defeated Ricky Marvin and Super Crazy to win the GHC Junior Heavyweight Tag Team Championship. On March 31, the two Taniguchis faced off in a grudge match, during which Taniguchi unmasked Taniguchi, Jr., revealing him as Suwa, before pinning him for the win. Following the event, Suwa abandoned the Taniguchi, Jr. gimmick and returned to working under his surname. On May 11 at Final Burning in Budokan, Suwa suffered a cervical spine injury and was replaced on all upcoming cards by "Maybach Suwa Jr", portrayed by Hajime Ohara. The injury also forced Suwa and Hirayanagi to vacate the GHC Junior Heavyweight Tag Team Championship on May 30. In December 2014, Suwa announced he was suffering from ossification of the posterior longitudinal ligament (OPLL) and would have to pull out of his scheduled return to the ring.

== Championships and accomplishments ==
- Distrito Federal
  - Distrito Federal Trios Championship (1 time) – with Shiima Nobunaga and Sumo Fuji
- International Wrestling Revolution Group
  - Copa Higher Power (1998) – with Lyguila, Magnum Tokyo, Ryo Saito, Shiima Nobunaga, Sumo Fujii and Último Dragón
- Michinoku Pro Wrestling
  - Futaritabi Tag Team League (1999) – with Cima
- Pro Wrestling Noah
  - GHC Junior Heavyweight Tag Team Championship (1 time) – with Genba Hirayanagi
- Toryumon Japan
  - British Commonwealth Junior Heavyweight Championship (1 time)
  - NWA World Welterweight Championship (1 time)
  - Último Dragón Gym Championship (1 time)
  - UWA World Trios Championship (3 times) – with Cima and Don Fujii
  - One Night Tag Tournament (2002) – with Taru
  - One Night Tag Tournament (2002) – with Cima
