= Cima (wrestler) =

Japanese professional wrestler

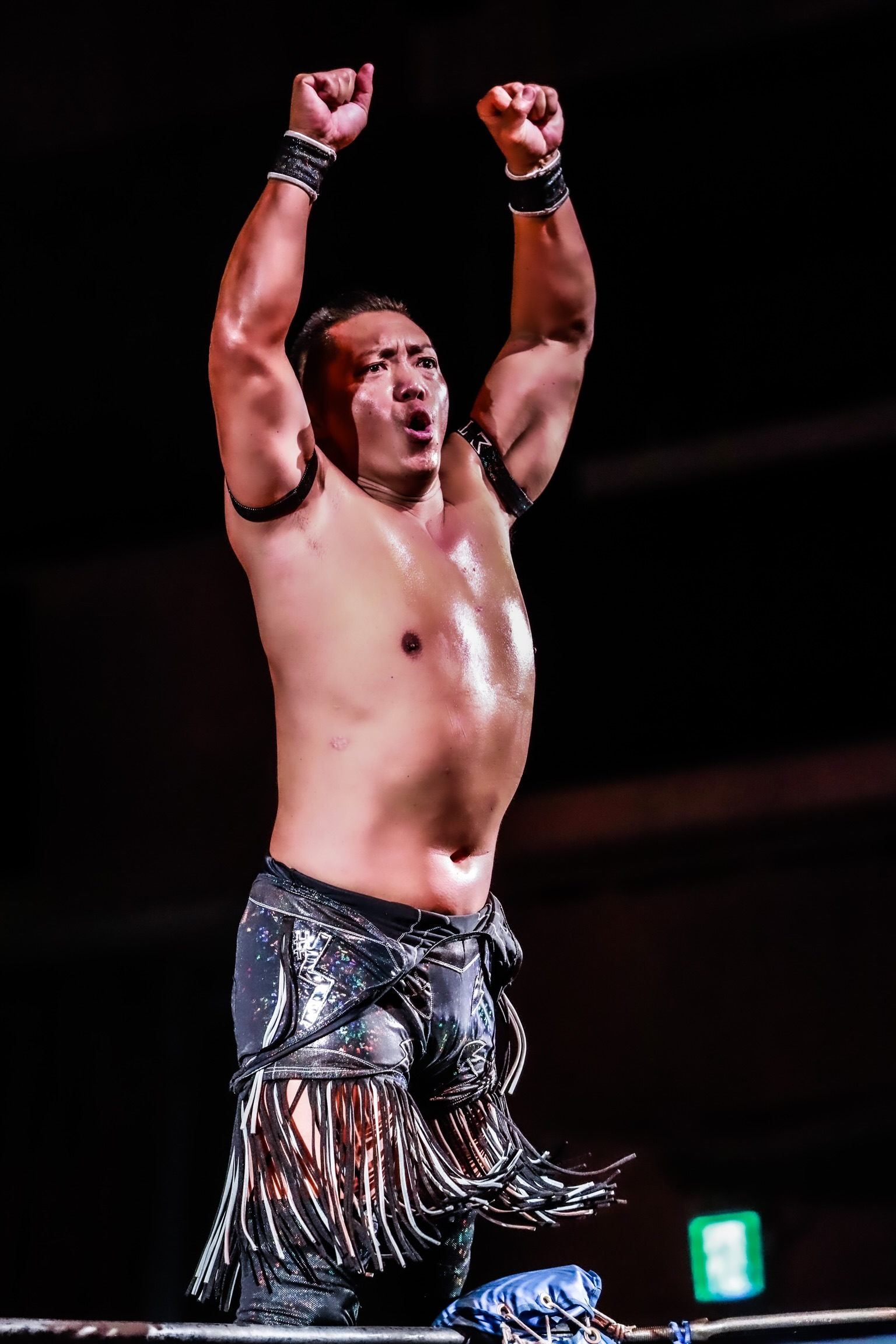
- Cima in 2022

Personal information
- Born: Nobuhiko Oshima (大島 伸彦, Ōshima Nobuhiko); November 15, 1977 (age 48) Sakai, Osaka, Japan
- Spouse: Eleni Masuda (m. 2009)

Professional wrestling career
- Ring name(s): Cima; Shiima Nobunaga; Shiima; Fuku-bancho Cima; BxB Cima; Ape Cima; Cima Nobunaga
- Billed height: 1.74 m (5 ft 9 in)
- Billed weight: 85 kg (187 lb)
- Billed from: Osaka, Japan
- Trained by: Último Dragón; Dos Caras
- Debut: May 11, 1997
- Retired: 2027

Nobuhiko Oshima (大島 伸彦, Ōshima Nobuhiko) (born November 15, 1977), better known by his ring name Cima (/ˈʃiːmə/ SHEE-mə) (most often stylized as CIMA), is a Japanese professional wrestler. As of 2025, he is currently a freelancer, but is inactive due to injury. He had previously worked for Oriental Wrestling Entertainment (OWE), where he had also served as the company's president. He was previously signed to Gleat from 2021 to 2025. He also made appearances for All Elite Wrestling (AEW) in 2019 and 2020.

Cima is best known for his work with Dragon Gate (DG), whom he worked for from the promotion's formation in 2004 up until 2018. In Dragon Gate, he held every available championship in the promotion, including the Open the Triangle Gate Championship a record 12 times. Cima has confirmed that 2027 will be his final year in professional wrestling, with his final match to be determined.

== Professional wrestling career ==
=== Toryumon and Dragon Gate (1997–2018) ===
Nobuhiko Oshima, otherwise known as Cima, graduated from the first class of Último Dragón's Toryumon dojo. He quickly became the Toryumon wrestling promotion's biggest star. He first wrestled as Shiima Nobunaga (making a few appearances in WCW under that name), then as Shiima (stylized in all capital letters), until finally shortening his stage name to Cima (also stylized in all capital letters), under which he still wrestles today. He was one of the founders of the Crazy Max stable, and had a years-long feud with Magnum Tokyo, another first class graduate. He began as a high flyer, utilizing the Mad Splash as his finisher. This, however, took a toll on his body and especially his knees. After returning from knee surgery he changed his style and started using the Schwein as his finisher. He wrestled in Toryumon Japan until 2004, when the promotion separated itself from Último Dragón's dojo, and changed its name to Dragon Gate. He created the Blood Generation stable in 2005, which had its final match in January 2007. On July 1, 2007, Cima won Dragon Gate's main title, the Open the Dream Gate Championship, from Jushin Thunder Liger in Kobe, Japan. Cima thus became the first wrestler to hold this title on two occasions.

Some time in May 2008, Cima developed a neck injury. He tried to recuperate from it early as best as he could, but by the end of June, it was becoming obvious that he would need to take considerable time off to rest and heal up properly. On June 29, he vacated the Dream Gate title, just a day shy of a one-year reign as champion. On September 8, 2008, Cima appeared in a non-wrestling role at Dragon Gate's event Dragon Gate Hawaii at the Waikiki Shell, although he got involved in one match accidentally, hitting Stalker Ichikawa with a steel chair. Cima would return to the ring on December 28, 2008, when he teamed with Jushin Thunder Liger in a losing effort to capture the Open the Twin Gate Championship. It was also on this day that his Typhoon unit was brought to an end, after Dragon Kid, Ryo Saito & Susumu Yokosuka lost in a Unit Split Survival Three-Way Six-Man Tag Match to teams from World-1 and Real Hazard. After that, nothing more was heard from him for over a month.

The silence was broken when, on February 9, 2009, before WWE Friday Night SmackDown, he wrestled in a dark match against Jamie Noble in a losing effort. He also wrestled for WPW in California on February 15 in a tag match. On March 1, he made his return to Dragon Gate, and announced the formation of the Warriors-5 stable along with Susumu Yokosuka, Gamma, and Kagetora. The fifth member, Ryoma, was added on the 20th.

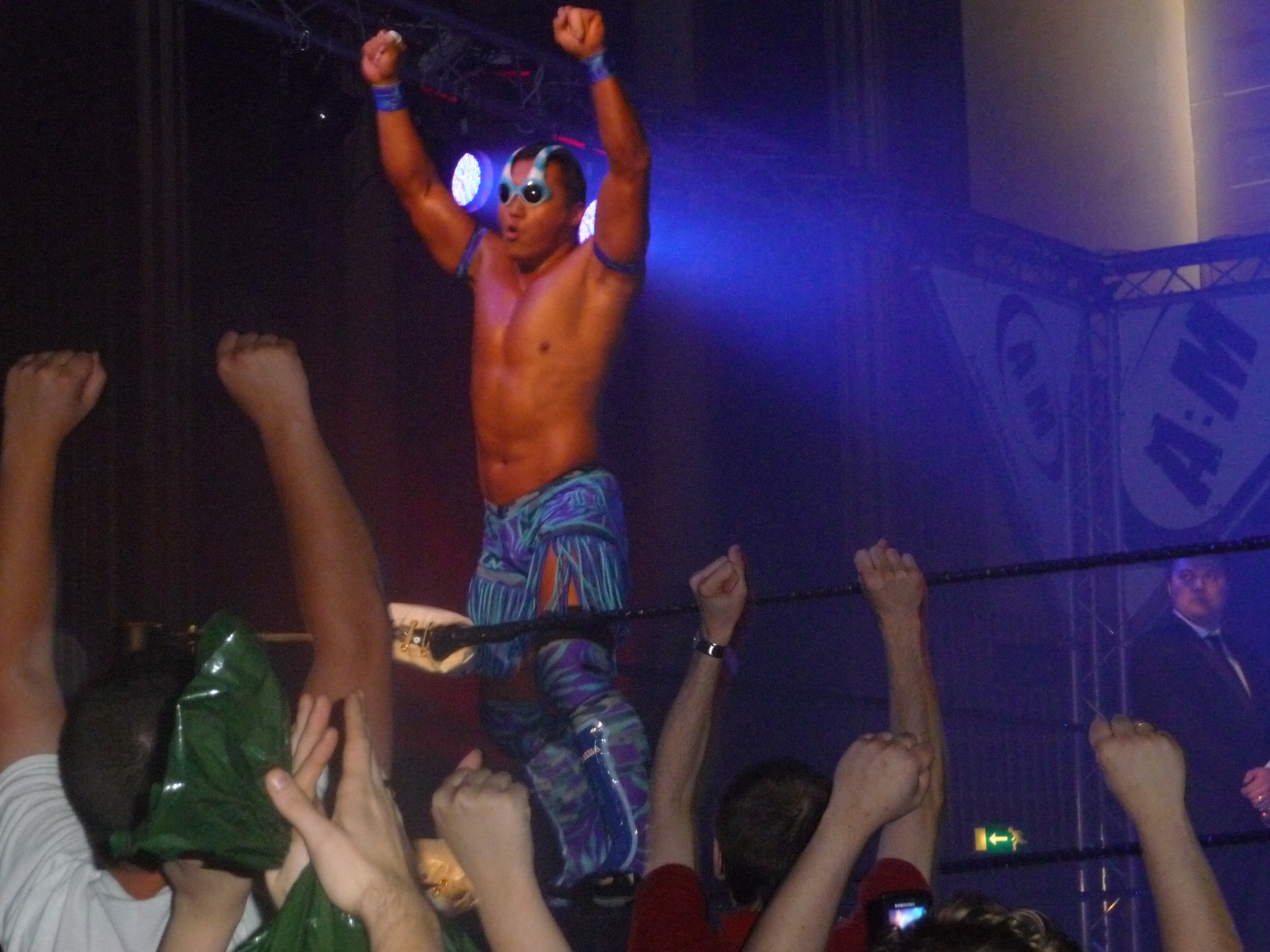
Cima during his ring entrance

Two days later, he defeated Masato Yoshino to become the new Open the Brave Gate Champion. On April 15, he, Gamma, and Kagetora won the Open the Triangle Gate Title from Shingo Takagi, Taku Iwasa, and Dragon Kid. They would eventually lose the belts to Masato Yoshino, BxB Hulk and Pac. He also challenged Open the Dream Gate Champion Naruki Doi to a Title vs. Title Match on July 19, and despite putting up a valiant effort, he lost the Brave Gate to Doi.

He and Gamma then participated in the 2009 Summer Adventure Tag League Tournament, but they performed very poorly, only winning one match out of eight and finishing in last place. On December 29, they won the Open the Twin Gate Title from Shingo Takagi and Yamato, but they immediately handed them back, declaring themselves only tentative champions, and desired to face a strong team to determine the actual champions. On February 10, Cima and Gamma defeated Naruki Doi and Masato Yoshino, officially becoming the Open the Twin Gate Champions. This win made Cima the first man to win every title in Dragon Gate. On March 22, Cima and Gamma lost the title to Takagi and Cyber Kong. On May 13, 2010, Cima, Gamma and Genki Horiguchi defeated Don Fujii, Masaaki Mochizuki and Akebono to win the Open the Triangle Gate Championship. On October 25, 2010, Cima, Gamma and Horiguchi lost the Open the Triangle Gate Championship to Naoki Tanizaki, Yasushi Kanda and Takuya Sugawara. Cima would regain the title on December 26, 2010, teaming with Dragon Kid and Ricochet.

On January 14, 2011, Cima and the Warriors turned heel, revealing themselves as the masked men who had been interfering in matches, and attacking Masato Yoshino and the World–1 group, before joining forces with Naruki Doi's group. On January 18 the new group was named Blood Warriors, a combination of the names of Cima's two previous stables, Blood Generation and Warriors. On May 15, the rest of Blood Warriors turned on Dragon Kid and kicked him out of the group, despite the fact that he still held the Open the Triangle Gate Championship with Cima and Ricochet, and replaced him with Cyber Kong and Tomahawk T.T. As a result, the title was declared vacant. On July 17, Cima and Ricochet defeated Dragon Kid and Pac of rival group Junction Three to win the Open the Twin Gate Championship. On September 11 at Way of the Ronin 2011, Cima and Ricochet defeated Masato Yoshino and Pac in a title vs. title match to win Dragon Gate USA (DGUSA)'s Open the United Gate Championship. After their third successful defense of the Open the Twin Gate Championship on November 30, Cima and Ricochet vacated the title in order for Ricochet to concentrate on defending the Open the Brave Gate Championship and Cima to concentrate on chasing the Open the Dream Gate Championship. On December 25 at Final Gate 2011, Cima defeated Masaaki Mochizuki to win the Open the Dream Gate Championship for the third time. On January 19, 2012, BxB Hulk and Akira Tozawa turned on Cima, causing him to lose a ten-man "Loser Leaves Unit" tag team match; as a result, Cima was kicked out of Blood Warriors.

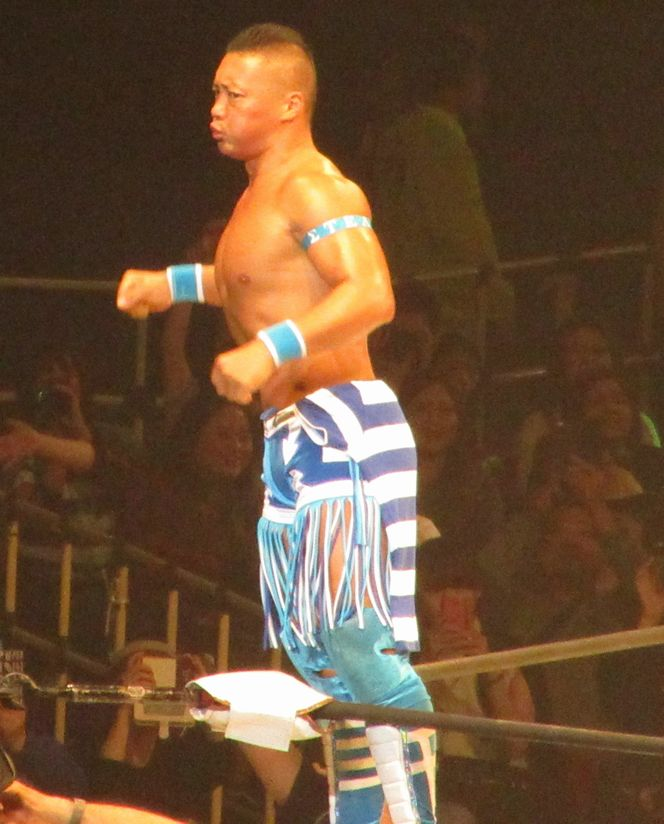
Cima in November 2016

After fifteen successful defenses and a reign of 574 days, Cima lost the Open the Dream Gate Championship to Shingo Takagi on July 21, 2013. During 2014, Cima won both the Open the Triangle Gate and Open the Twin Gate Championship alongside his Veteran-gun stablemates, but lost both titles in first defense. On December 3, 2014, after losing the Open the Twin Gate Championship, Cima and Gamma were forced into joining the villainous Mad Blankey stable. As part of the stable, Cima made unsuccessful attempts at recapturing the Open the Triangle Gate Championship. Cima remained a part of Mad Blankey until May 5, 2015, when members of the stable turned on him, costing him a six-way steel cage match, as a result of which he was shaved bald. On June 14, he, Don Fujii and Gamma defeated the Jimmyz (Genki Horiguchi H.A.Gee.Mee!!, Jimmy Susumu and Ryo "Jimmy" Saito) to win the Open the Triangle Gate Championship. On October 8, Cima formed a new unit with Eita, Gamma, El Lindaman, Punch Tominaga, and rookies Kaito Ishida and Takehiro Yamamura. On November 1, the unit was named Over Generation. The same day, he, Gamma, and Don Fujii defended the Open the Triangle Gate Championship against the Jimmyz (Jimmy Susumu, Jimmy K-Ness J.K.S., and Ryo "Jimmy" Saito), and vacated the title afterwards. In the summer of 2016, Cima took part in the 2016 King of Gate, finishing with 6 points and failing to advance to the final. Cima teamed up with Gamma once again for the Summer Adventure Tag League, making it to the semi-finals where they lost to VerserK (Naruki Doi and Yasshi). On November 3, Cima and Dragon Kid captured the Open The Dream Gate Titles, defeating Jimmy Kagetora and Jimmy Susumu in Osaka. The two held the titles for over a year until they were forced to vacate them due to Dragon Kid suffering an injury. Cima found a new partner in Susumu, but the two were unsuccessful in defeating Eita and T-Hawk for the vacant titles at Final Gate in December 2017.

=== Overseas promotions (2005–present) ===
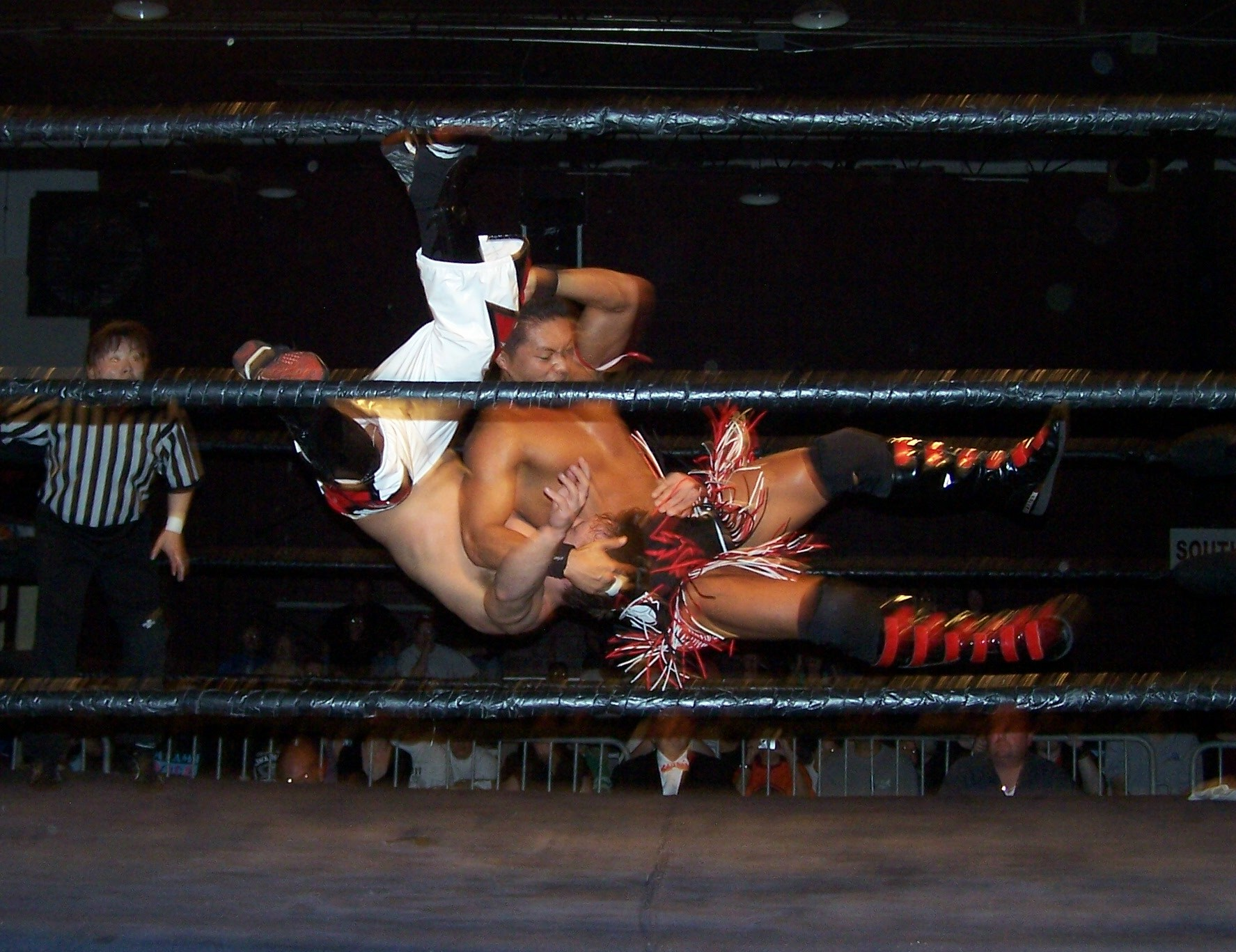
Cima performing the Schwein on Jack Evans.

Cima also made his first appearance in a North American wrestling promotion in about seven years in August 2005, appearing in Ring of Honor in a match against A.J. Styles, who Cima defeated.

Cima would return to North America for a three-day tour with Ring of Honor (ROH). On March 30, 2006, in Detroit, Michigan, Cima teamed with fellow Blood Generation members Naruki Doi and Masato Yoshino to defeat Ring of Honor faction Generation Next, represented by Austin Aries, Roderick Strong, and Jack Evans.

On March 31, 2006, in Chicago, Illinois, Cima would once again team with fellow Blood Generation members Naruki Doi and Masato Yoshino in Ring of Honor, this time losing a match to another stable from Dragon Gate, Do Fixer (Dragon Kid, Ryo Saito, and Genki Horiguchi). Dave Meltzer of The Wrestling Observer gave the match the coveted 5 star rating.

On April 1, 2006, once again in Chicago, Illinois, at the third and final Ring of Honor show, Cima teamed with Naruki Doi in a losing attempt to win the Ring of Honor Tag Title from champions Generation Next (Austin Aries and Roderick Strong).

In September 2006 during the Labor Day Weekend, Cima participated in the Pro Wrestling Guerrilla (PWG) Battle of Los Angeles super tournament. He was able to advance all the way to the finals where he lost to Davey Richards.

Cima's next return to Ring of Honor happened in late December 2006. Cima teamed with Shingo on December 22 in Hartford, Connecticut, to challenge Christopher Daniels and Matt Sydal for the ROH World Tag Team Title, but the Japanese stars came up short in the match. The next night, in Manhattan, New York, Cima and Shingo teamed with Matt Sydal to take on the team of Austin Aries, Roderick Strong, and Delirious. This time, they were successful in their outing, when Cima pinned Delirious. After the match, Cima proclaimed "Thank you US, thank you ROH, see you in 2007".

On January 6, 2007, Cima traveled to Australia and competed in the Australasian Wrestling Federation. In the main event, he wrestled the AWF Champion Steve Ravenous and TNT in a three-way elimination match, which Cima won to become the AWF Champion. The next night in Newcastle, TNT defeated Cima for the AWF Title.

On September 2, 2007, Cima won Pro Wrestling Guerrilla's Battle of Los Angeles tournament, defeating Human Tornado, Shingo and Pac on his way to the finals where he eliminated both El Generico and Roderick Strong.

On September 5, 2007, Cima made his debut in Hawaii (along with Dragon Kid, Susumu Yokosuka and Shingo Takagi) for Action Zone Wrestling, losing to AZW Heavyweight Champion Kris Kavanaugh. After the match, Cima thanked the fans and asked if Hawaii enjoyed Dragon Gate, to which the crowd started a loud Dragon Gate chant. He promised Dragon Gate would be back in Hawaii, and in AZW. He returned to AZW on January 7, 2008 at Battleclash III to defeat "Sweet & Sour" Larry Sweeney.

On January 29, 2012, Cima returned to PWG, teaming with Ricochet in a match, where they were defeated by the RockNES Monsters (Johnny Goodtime and Johnny Yuma). On March 30, Cima and Ricochet were forced to vacate the Open the United Gate Championship, after Cima was sidelined with a neck injury. On July 29 at Enter the Dragon 2012, Dragon Gate USA's third anniversary event, Cima and A. R. Fox defeated Rich Swann and Ricochet to win the vacant Open the United Gate Championship. They lost the title to The Young Bucks (Matt Jackson and Nick Jackson) on April 6, 2013. He participated in the 2018 Battle of Los Angeles, making it to the second round where he lost to Joey Janela.

On May 25, 2019, Cima appeared at All Elite Wrestling's inaugural event Double or Nothing, alongside his #StrongHearts stablemates T-Hawk, El Lindaman, in a defeat to SoCal Uncensored (Christopher Daniels, Frankie Kazarian and Scorpio Sky).

=== Oriental Wrestling Entertainment and Gleat (2018–2025) ===
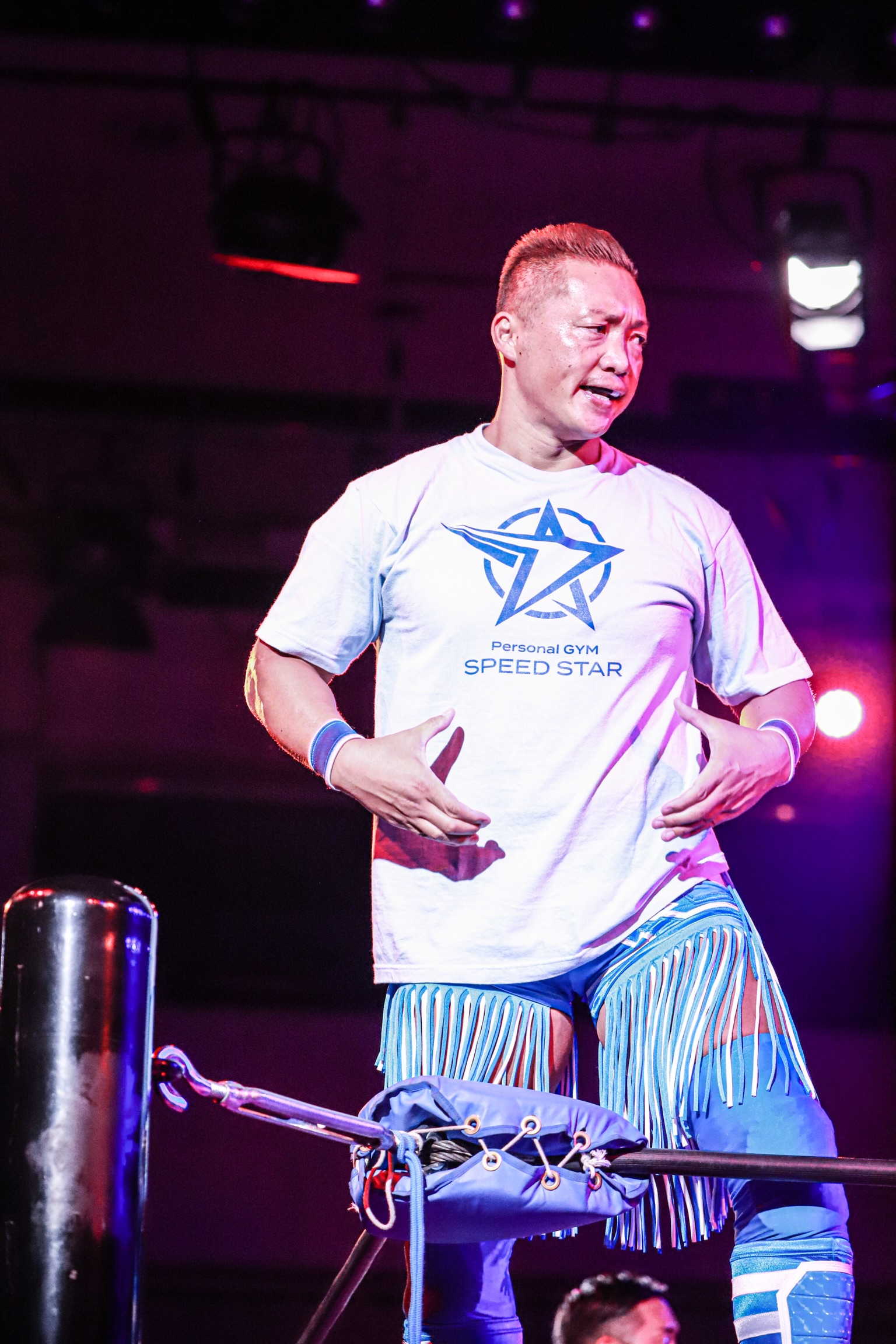
Cima at a Gleat show in November 2022

In early 2018, Cima announced his departure from Dragon Gate after 21 years working for the promotion, and also announced the formation of a new promotion, Oriental Wrestling Entertainment (OWE), to be primarily based in China. T-Hawk, El Lindaman and Takehiro Yamamura also left Dragon Gate to join OWE. At OWE's inaugural event on May 7, Cima defeated T-Hawk. On June 22, representing OWE, he debuted in Wrestle-1, defeating Jun Tonsho. The rest of the OWE roster soon debuted in the promotion too, and named themselves "#StrongHearts", later recruiting Dezmond Xavier and Zachary Wentz to the group. Cima and Strong Hearts also debuted for DDT Pro-Wrestling (DDT) in September, defeating All Out (Konosuke Takeshita, Akito, Shunma Katsumata and Yuki Iino). On October 28, Cima, Duan Yingnan and T-Hawk defeated Damnation (Mad Paulie, Soma Takao and Tetsuya Endo) to win the KO-D 6 Man Tag Team Championship. The group dropped the titles to All Out on January 3.

In May 2021, it was announced that Cima, along with El Lindaman and T-Hawk, would be leaving OWE to join Gleat. At Wrestle Kingdom 16, he participated in the battle royal match, marking his first appearance for New Japan Pro-Wrestling (NJPW) in over a decade.

On December 31, 2025, Cima's contract with Gleat expired and he elected to depart from the company, ending his four-year tenure with the promotion.

== Personal life ==
Oshima is married to television personality Eleni Masuda. The pair met in 2003 during a baseball game in Fukuoka, where he threw out the first pitch. He proposed to her in 2005 during a vacation in Greece and they finally wed in June 2009.

In 2009, Cima was one of many Dragon Gate wrestlers embroiled in an animal abuse scandal surrounding Cora, the pet monkey that lived in the Dragon Gate dojo. It was alleged the monkey had been choked until it passed out, burned with charcoal, thrown into a tub of boiling hot water, fed sake regularly until it would pass out, dragged around by a chain on its neck, and burned with fire crackers. Cima was reportedly the one who had brought the monkey into the dojo, but had failed to keep up with the exotic animals preservation laws, though he was not accused of any of the abuse. After the events came to light, Cima took a three-month pay cut and shaved his head to show remorse.

== Championships and accomplishments ==
- All Japan Pro Wrestling

- World Junior Heavyweight Championship (1 time)

- Australasian Wrestling Federation

- AWF Australasian Championship (1 time)

- DDT Pro-Wrestling

- KO-D 6 Man Tag Team Championship (1 time) – with Duan Yingnan and T-Hawk
- Ironman Heavymetalweight Championship (1 time)

- Dragon Gate

- Open the Brave Gate Championship (1 time)
- Open the Dream Gate Championship (3 times)
- Open the Owarai Gate Championship (3 times)
- Open the Twin Gate Championship (5 times) – with Gamma (3), Ricochet (1) and Dragon Kid (1)
- Open the Triangle Gate Championship (12 times) – with Naruki Doi and Shingo Takagi (1), Naruki Doi and Don Fujii (1), Magnitude Kishiwada and Masato Yoshino (1), Jack Evans and BxB Hulk (1), Ryo Saito and Susumu Yokosuka (2), Gamma and Kagetora (1), Gamma and Genki Horiguchi (2), Dragon Kid and Ricochet (1), and Don Fujii and Gamma (2)
- Open the Triangle Gate League (2006)

- Dragon Gate USA

- Open the United Gate Championship (2 times) – with Ricochet (1) and A. R. Fox (1)

- Gleat
  - G-Infinity Championship (2 times) – with Kaz Hayashi (1) and Kuroshio Tokyo Japan (1)
  - G-Infinity Title Tournament (2024) with – Kaz Hayashi
- International Wrestling Revolution Group

- IWRG Intercontinental Welterweight Championship (2 times)
- Copa Higher Power (1998) – with Judo Suwa, Lyguila, Magnum Tokyo, Ryo Saito, Sumo Fujii and Último Dragón
- Copa Higher Power (2007)

- Michinoku Pro Wrestling

- Futaritabi Tag Team League (1999) – with Suwa

- Pro Wrestling Guerrilla

- Battle of Los Angeles (2007)

- Pro Wrestling Illustrated

- Ranked No. 44 of the top 500 singles wrestlers in the PWI 500 in 2000

- Tokyo Sports

- Technique Award (2006)

- Toryumon Japan

- International Light Heavyweight Championship (1 time, final)
- Último Dragón Gym Championship (2 times)
- UWA World Trios Championship (4 times) – with Suwa and Big/Don Fujii (3), and Big Fujii and Taru (1)
- El Numero Uno League (2003)
- One Night Tag Tournament (2002) – with Suwa
- UDG Championship Tournament (2004)

- Wrestling Observer Newsletter

- Wrestling Observer Newsletter Hall of Fame (2024)

== Luchas de Apuestas record ==
Winner (wager)	Loser (wager)	Location	Event	Date	Notes
Cima (hair)	Masaaki Mochizuki (hair)	Tokyo, Japan	La Ultima Calola	December 10, 2001	(Note: This was a Lumberjack match.)
Gamma (hair)	Cima (hair)	Osaka, Japan	Crown Gate: Osaka Special	November 23, 2006	
Cima (hair)	Yasushi Kanda (hair)	Aichi, Japan	Dead or Alive	May 5, 2008	(Note: This was a six-way steel cage match, which also included BxB Hulk, Dragon Kid, Masato Yoshino and Yamato.)
Cima (passport)	Mondai Ryu (mask)	Tokyo, Japan	Rainbow Gate 2012	July 6, 2012	(Note: Two-on-one handicap Falls Count Anywhere, where Cima faced Ryu and Akira Tozawa.)
T-Hawk (hair)	Cima (hair)	Nagoya, Japan	Dead or Alive 2015	May 5, 2015	(Note: This was a steel cage match, which also included Kzy, Ryo "Jimmy" Saito, Shingo Takagi and Yamato.)
