= Copa Higher Power =

International Wrestling Revolution Group tournament

The Copa Higher Power (Spanish for "Cup of Higher Power") is an annual tournament promoted by the Mexican lucha libre professional wrestling promotion International Wrestling Revolution Group (IWRG). The tournament has been annual since September 1997.

== Tournament ==
The tournament is featured in two different forms, as a singles tournament and as a tag team tournament. It was featured as a team tournament in 1997 and in 2003 it began as a singles tournament.

== Copa Higher Power Tournament winners ==
Year	Winner(s)	Date	Location	Notes
1997	Dr. Cerebro, Fantasy, Mr. Águila, Neblina and Tony Rivera	September 16, 1997	Naucalpan, State of Mexico, Mexico	
1998	Judo Suwa, Lyguila, Magnum Tokyo, Ryo Saito, Shiima Nobunaga, Sumo Fujii and Último Dragón	January 18, 1998	Naucalpan, State of Mexico, Mexico	
1998	Mr. Niebla, El Pantera, Shocker, El Solar, Star Boy and Mike Segura	September 6, 1998	Naucalpan, State of Mexico, Mexico	
1999	Astro Rey Jr., Máscara Mágica, Rey Bucanero, El Satánico and Último Guerrero	September 16, 1999	Naucalpan, State of Mexico, Mexico	
2003	Villano V	September 25, 2003	Naucalpan, State of Mexico, Mexico	
2004	NOSAWA, MAZADA, Garuda & Black Tiger III	January 22, 2004	Naucalpan, State of Mexico, Mexico	
2006	Marco Corleone	October 29, 2006	Naucalpan, State of Mexico, Mexico	
2007	CIMA	May 17, 2007	Naucalpan, State of Mexico, Mexico	
2009	Bobby Lee Jr.	September 6, 2009	Naucalpan, State of Mexico, Mexico	
2010	Dr. Cerebro, El Hijo del Pantera and Trauma II	February 4, 2010	Naucalpan, State of Mexico, Mexico	
2010	Silver King	May 16, 2010	Naucalpan, State of Mexico, Mexico	
2010	911	July 24, 2010	Naucalpan, State of Mexico, Mexico	
2011	Damián 666 and Lizmark, Jr.	January 16, 2011	Naucalpan, State of Mexico, Mexico	
2011	La Máquina Infernal	July 23, 2011	Naucalpan, State of Mexico, Mexico	
2011	Multifacético	July 31, 2011	Naucalpan, State of Mexico, Mexico	
2011	Saruman	September 16, 2011	Naucalpan, State of Mexico, Mexico	
2012	Trauma II	May 17, 2012	Naucalpan, State of Mexico, Mexico	
