= British Commonwealth Junior Heavyweight Championship =

Professional wrestling championship

Details
- Promotion: Michinoku Pro Wrestling (1995–2001); Toryumon (2001–2003)
- Date established: 1995
- Date retired: December 7, 2003
Statistics
- First champion: Doc Dean
- Final champion: Jun
- Most reigns: The Great Sasuke, Último Dragón, Jushin Thunder Liger and Tiger Mask (IV) (2 reigns)
- Longest reign: Suwa (461 days)
- Shortest reign: Danny Collins (1 day)

The British Commonwealth Junior Heavyweight Championship (Note: Known in Japan as 英連邦ジュニアヘビー級王座 (Eirenbō Junia Hebī-kyū Ōza).) was a professional wrestling championship that although being created in England, was most notorious in Japan.

== History ==
Not long after its creation in 1995, the title made its way to Michinoku Pro Wrestling where it stayed until Jushin Thunder Liger took it to New Japan Pro-Wrestling and combined it with seven other junior heavyweight titles to create the J-Crown. After the J-Crown was disbanded, the title resurfaced in England for a short time. After a tour of England, Tiger Mask took the title back to Japan, where it returned to Michinoku Pro then made its way to Toryumon, where it was last defended before being deactivated.

== Reigns ==
Key
No.	Overall reign number
Reign	Reign number for the specific champion
Days	Number of days held
N/A	Unknown information
(NLT)	Championship change took place "no later than" the date listed

No.	Champion	Championship change			Reign statistics		Notes	Ref.
No.	Champion	Date	Event	Location	Reign	Days	Notes	Ref.
1	Doc Dean	April 1995 (NLT)	N/A	N/A	1	(Note: The exact date the championship was won has not been confirmed, putting this title reign at between 104 days and 133 days.)	Title won in unknown circumstances.	
2	Stevie "J"	August 12, 1995	N/A	London, England	1	44		
Michinoku Pro Wrestling (MPW)
3	The Great Sasuke	September 25, 1995	Lucha Path 1995	Akita, Japan	1	223		
4	Danny Collins	May 5, 1996	Sasuke, What Did I Do, Yo? 1996	Sendai, Japan	1	1		
5	Dick Togo	May 6, 1996	Sasuke, What Did I Do, Yo? 1996	Nakayama, Japan	1	42		
6	Jushin Thunder Liger	June 17, 1996	The Skydiving-J	Tokyo, Japan	1	46	This was a New Japan Pro-Wrestling event.	
7	Último Dragón	August 2, 1996	G1 Climax 1996	Tokyo, Japan	1	3	This was the first round of the J-Crown tournament, held by New Japan Pro-Wrestling.	
8	The Great Sasuke	August 5, 1996	G1 Climax 1996	Tokyo, Japan	2	67	This was the final of the J-Crown tournament, held by New Japan Pro-Wrestling. The title became part of the J-Crown.	
9	Último Dragón	October 11, 1996	Osaka Crush Night!	Osaka, Japan	2	85	This match, held at a Wrestle Association R event, was for The Great Sasuke's eight-title J-Crown.	
10	Jushin Thunder Liger	January 4, 1997	'97 Wrestling World in Tokyo Dome	Tokyo, Japan	2	183	This match, held at a New Japan Pro-Wrestling event, was for Último Dragón's eight-title J-Crown.	
11	El Samurai	July 6, 1997	Summer Struggle 1997	Sapporo, Japan	1	35	This match, held at a New Japan Pro-Wrestling event, was for Jushin Thunder Liger's seven-title J-Crown.	
12	Shinjiro Otani	August 10, 1997	The Four Heaven in Nagoya Dome	Nagoya, Japan	1	87	This match, held at a New Japan Pro-Wrestling event, was for El Samurai's seven-title J-Crown.	
—	Vacated	November 5, 1997	—	—	—	—	After being asked by World Wrestling Federation to vacate and return the WWF Light Heavyweight Championship, Shinjiro Otani vacated all the J-Crown titles with the exception of the IWGP Junior Heavyweight Championship.	
13	Dirtbike Kid	February 14, 1998	EWA St. Valentine's Day Massacre	London, England	1	(Note: The exact date the championship was vacated has not been confirmed, putting this title reign at between 321 days and 421 days.)	Defeated Mikey Whipwreck to win the vacant title.	
—	Vacated	1999	—	—	—	—	Title vacated for unknown reasons.	
14	Tiger Mask (IV)	April 11, 1999	Wrestling Rampage	London, England	1	(Note: The exact date the championship was vacated has not been confirmed, putting this title reign at between 1 day and 247 days.)	Defeated Jason Cross to win the vacant title on the first episode of Ultimate Wrestling Alliance's Wrestling Rampage that aired on May 14, 1999.	
—	Vacated	1999	—	—	—	—	Title vacated for unknown reasons.	
15	Curry Man	December 14, 1999	N/A	Niigata, Japan	1	103	Defeated Minoru Fujita to win the vacant title.	
16	Tiger Mask (IV)	March 26, 2000	House show	Aomori, Japan	2	349		
17	Masaaki Mochizuki	March 10, 2001	Lucha Baka Diary	Tokyo, Japan	1	113		
Toryumon Japan
18	Magnum Tokyo	July 1, 2001	II Aniversario	Kobe, Japan	1	257		
19	Suwa	March 15, 2002	Alegria	Kawasaki, Japan	1	461		
20	Condotti Shuji	June 19, 2003	El Camino Para Aniversario	Tokyo, Japan	1	144	This was a three-way match also involving Masaaki Mochizuki. During his reign, Condotti Shuji shortened his name to Dotti Shuji.	
21	Jun	November 10, 2003	Premium Live Match Vol. 46	Kobe, Japan	1	27		
—	Deactivated	December 7, 2003	Feliz Navidad	—	—	—	Title vacated after Jun's defense against Second Doi was ruled a no contest due to interference by "brother" Yasshi and Dotti Shuji. The title then remained inactive until the promotion closed.	

== Combined reigns ==
¤	The exact length of at least one title reign is uncertain, so the shortest possible length is used.

Rank	Wrestler	No. of reigns	Combined days
1	Suwa	1	461
2	Tiger Mask (IV)	2	350¤
3	Dirtbike Kid	1	321¤
4	The Great Sasuke	2	290
5	Magnum Tokyo	1	257
6	Jushin Thunder Liger	2	229
7	Condotti Shuji	1	144
8	Masaaki Mochizuki	1	113
9	Doc Dean	1	104¤
10	Curry Man	1	103
11	Último Dragón	2	88
12	Shinjiro Otani	1	87
13	Stevie "J"	1	44
14	Dick Togo	1	42
15	El Samurai	1	35
16	Jun	1	27
17	Danny Collins	1	1

== See also ==
- Professional wrestling in the United Kingdom
