= Último Dragón Gym Championship =

Professional wrestling championship

Details
- Promotion: Toryumon
- Date established: April 22, 2003
- Date retired: July 5, 2004
Statistics
- First champion: Cima
- Final champion: Cima
- Most reigns: Cima (2 reigns)
- Longest reign: Magnum Tokyo (224 days)
- Shortest reign: Cima (1 day)

The Último Dragón Gym Championship (also shortened to UDG Championship) was a professional wrestling championship created and promoted by the Japanese promotion Toryumon Japan. It was established in April 2003 as an award for the winner of the El Numero Uno tournament. The title was short-lived however, with only three distinctive champions over four reigns. It was deactivated on July 5, 2004, after Toryumon Japan restructured into Dragon Gate, and was replaced by the Open the Dream Gate Championship. The inaugural and final champion was Cima.

As it was a professional wrestling championship, the championship was not won not by actual competition, but by a scripted ending to a match determined by the bookers and match makers. (Note: Hornbaker (2016) p. 550: "Professional wrestling is a sport in which match finishes are predetermined. Thus, win–loss records are not indicative of a wrestler's genuine success based on their legitimate abilities – but on now much, or how little they were pushed by promoters") On occasion the promotion declares a championship vacant, which means there is no champion at that point in time. This can either be due to a storyline, (Note: Duncan & Will (2000) p. 271, Chapter: Texas: NWA American Tag Team Title [World Class, Adkisson] "Championship held up and rematch ordered because of the interference of manager Gary Hart") or real life issues such as a champion suffering an injury being unable to defend the championship, (Note: Duncan & Will (2000) p. 20, Chapter: (United States: 19th Century & widely defended titles – NWA, WWF, AWA, IW, ECW, NWA) NWA/WCW TV Title "Rhodes stripped on 85/10/19 for not defending the belt after having his leg broken by Ric Flair and Ole & Arn Anderson") or leaving the company. (Note: Duncan & Will (2000) p. 201, Chapter: (Memphis, Nashville) Memphis: USWA Tag Team Title "Vacant on 93/01/18 when Spike leaves the USWA.")

== Title history ==
Key
No.	Overall reign number
Reign	Reign number for the specific champion
Days	Number of days held
Defenses	Number of successful defenses

No.	Champion	Championship change			Reign statistics			Notes	Ref.
No.	Champion	Date	Event	Location	Reign	Days	Defenses	Notes	Ref.
1	Cima	April 22, 2003	El Numero Uno 2003 Final Day	Tokyo, Japan	1	68	1	Defeated Genki Horiguchi in the final of the 2003 El Numero Uno tournament to become the first champion.	
2	Magnum Tokyo	June 29, 2003	IVrt Aniversario	Kobe, Japan	1	224	3		
3	Suwa	February 8, 2004	El Mes el Amor y la Amistad	Fukuoka, Japan	1	77	0		
—	Vacated	April 25, 2004	El Numero Uno 2004	Nagoya, Japan	—	—	—	Suwa vacated the title due to injury.	
4	Cima	July 4, 2004	Vo Aniversario	Kobe, Japan	2	1	0	Defeated Shuji Kondo in a tournament final to win the vacant title.	
—	Deactivated	July 5, 2004	—	—	—	—	—	Cima vacated the title and abandoned it when Toryumon Japan changed its name to Dragon Gate. The title was replaced with the Open the Dream Gate Championship.	

== Combined reigns ==
Rank	Wrestler	No. of reigns	Combined defenses	Combined days
1	Magnum Tokyo	1	3	224
2	Suwa	1	0	77
3	Cima	2	1	69
