= Último Dragón =

Mexican-Japanese professional wrestler

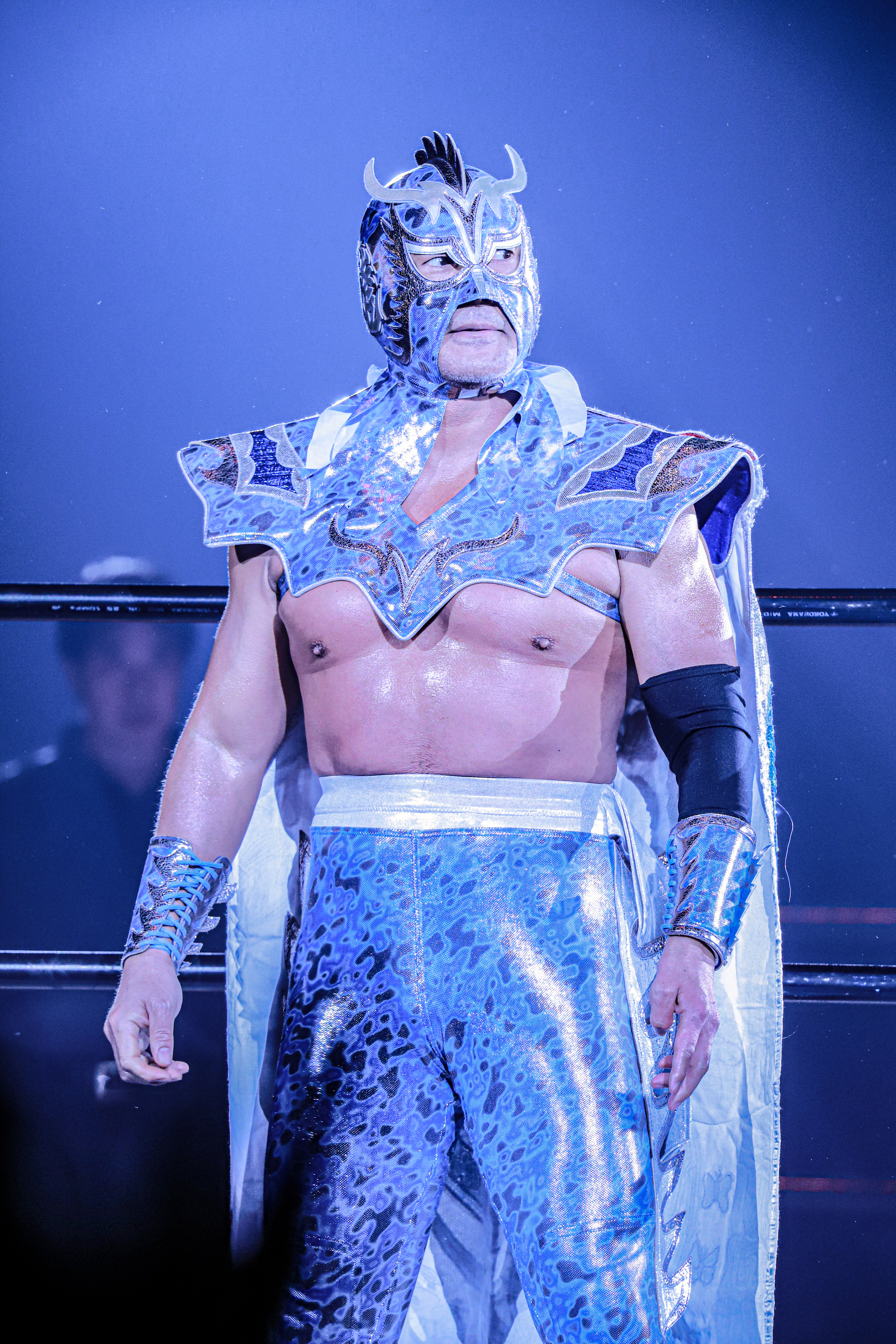
- Último Dragón in 2023

Personal information
- Born: Yoshihiro Asai; December 12, 1966 (age 59) Nagoya, Aichi, Japan

Professional wrestling career
- Ring name(s): Asai; Saigon Dragon; The Tiger II; Tiger Dragon; Ultimate Dragon; Último Dragón; Yoshihiro Asai
- Billed height: 5 ft 8 in (173 cm)
- Billed weight: 185 lb (84 kg)
- Billed from: Mexico City, Mexico; Nagoya, Japan
- Trained by: Gran Hamada; Kotetsu Yamamoto; NJPW Dojo
- Debut: May 13, 1987

Yoshihiro Asai (浅井嘉浩, Asai Yoshihiro; born December 12, 1966), better known by his ring name Último Dragón (ウルティモ・ドラゴン, Urutimo Doragon), is a Japanese professional wrestler signed to Dragon Gate, where he acts as an in-ring talent, trainer and senior advisor. In addition to having trained in Japan, Asai learned to wrestle in the lucha libre style while working in Mexico. He is credited with popularizing the "Asai Moonsault".

On October 11, 1996, Asai won the J-Crown, a unification of eight lower weight division titles from various international promotions. At the time, he already held the NWA World Middleweight Championship and during this reign he also became the WCW Cruiserweight Champion. From December 29, 1996, through January 4, 1997, he concurrently held ten titles, making him the most simultaneously-decorated wrestler in history until Mercedes Moné broke his record in 2025. From 2013 until 2019, he competed primarily for All Japan Pro Wrestling (AJPW) as a freelancer. In 2019, he joined Dragon Gate as a senior advisor and wrestler.

== Professional wrestling career ==
=== Early years (1984–1996) ===
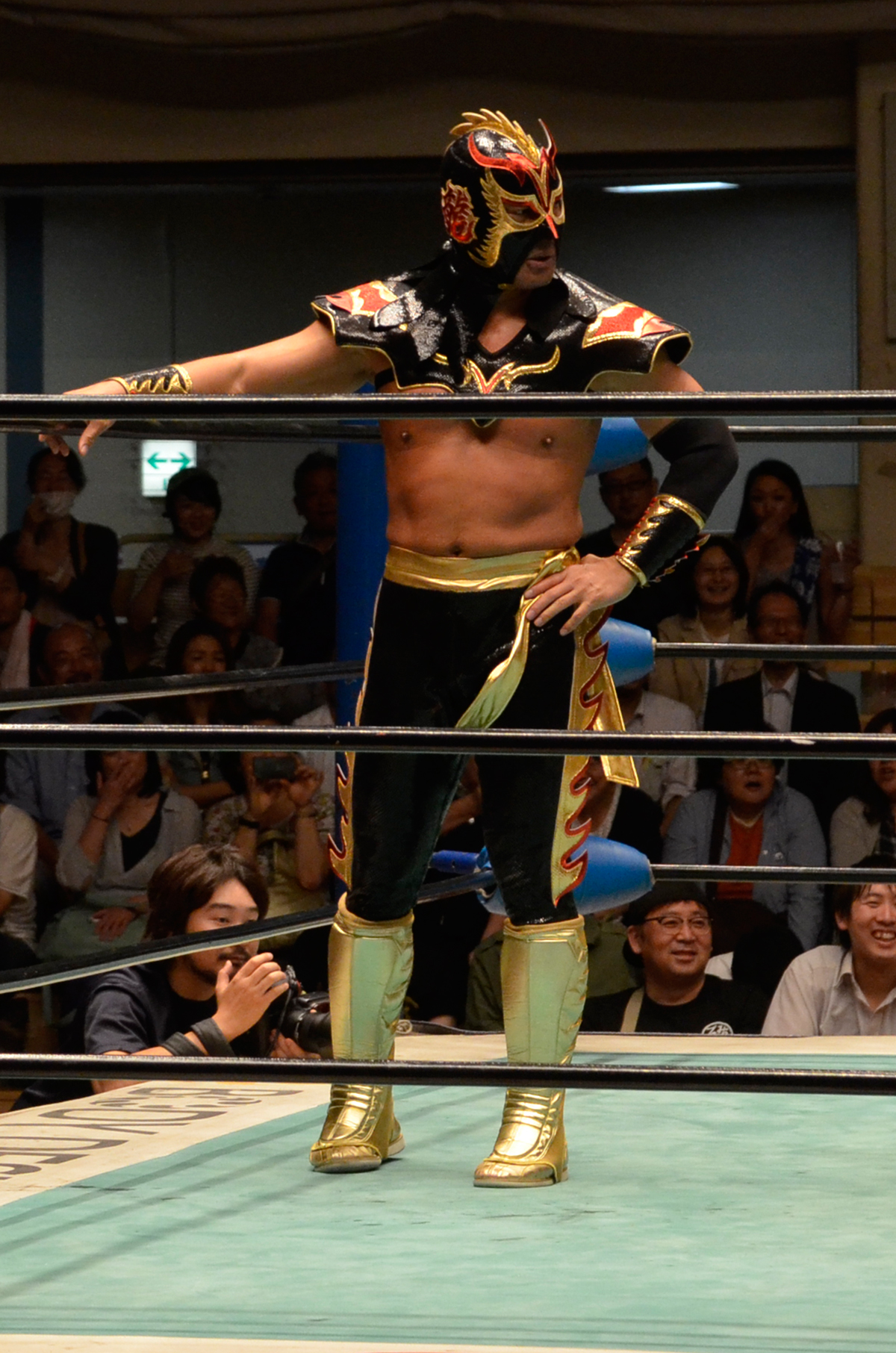
Asai performing as Último Dragón

Asai trained in the New Japan Pro-Wrestling (NJPW) dojo in 1987, but was not drafted up by the promotion due to his small size. He moved to Mexico where he joined the Universal Wrestling Association and subsequently won the UWA World Welterweight Championship in 1988. In March 1990, he joined the Universal Wrestling Federation in Japan. He also competed in the Universal Lucha Libre promotion founded by his mentor Gran Hamada.

In 1991, he signed with the Mexican Consejo Mundial de Lucha Libre (CMLL) promotion. In CMLL, he adopted the Último Dragón mask and persona. "Último Dragón", which means "Last Dragon" in Spanish, was initially a gimmick that saw Asai claiming to be the last student taught by legendary martial artist Bruce Lee, whose nickname was "The Dragon". The gimmick was later dropped, but the name remained. When he returned to Japan in 1992, he chose to join Super World of Sports. Late in 1992, Misteriosito was turned into "Último Dragoncito", a Mini-Estrella version of Asai. After SWS closed, Asai signed with the Japanese WAR promotion, and due to co-promoting, he was able to wrestle for NJPW. In Japan, he became IWGP Junior heavyweight champion twice, and in Mexico, he held various titles. In later years, he wrestled for AAA.

=== World Championship Wrestling (1996–1998) ===
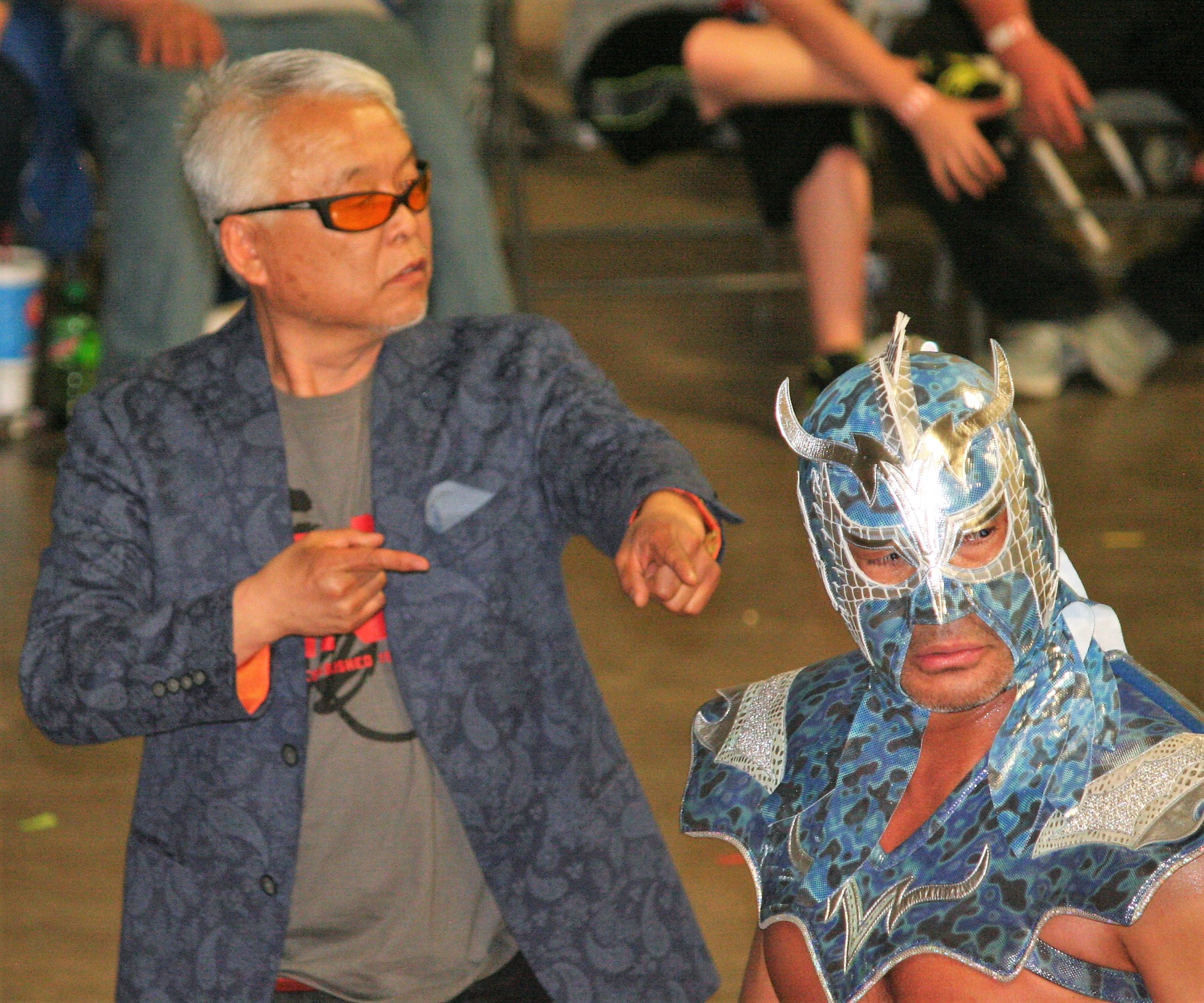
Último Dragón and former manager Sonny Onoo in 2017

Asai made his American debut for the World Championship Wrestling (WCW) promotion in August 1996 initially under the mistranslated name "Ultimate Dragon". He was referred to by this name for over a year in WCW until they reverted to using his Spanish ring name. He quickly was pushed into the lime-light of the WCW Cruiserweight division with Sonny Onoo as his manager. He was instantly a heel based upon the fact he was Japanese and Onoo was his manager. He made his WCW pay-per view debut in 1996's Hog Wild against Rey Misterio Jr. for the WCW Cruiserweight Championship but lost. He got back the win at WCW World War 3 (1996) when he returned to WCW as the J-Crown champion. Between November 24, 1996 and January 4, 1997 Último Dragón held the WWF Light Heavyweight title simultaneously with the WCW Cruiserweight title. He then feuded with Dean Malenko for the WCW Cruiserweight title which he won at Starrcade 1996.

Dragon later dropped the WCW Cruiserweight title back to Malenko but his stock was rising as he won the WCW World Television Championship from Prince Iaukea but lost it to Steven Regal. He then turned on Onoo and began a face run and (kayfabe) moved back to Mexico and regained the World Television title from Regal before losing to Alex Wright at Clash of the Champions XXXV. He would then win the WCW Cruiserweight title one last time from Eddie Guerrero, before losing the title on the first WCW Thunder to Juventud Guerrera. He then suffered an arm injury in 1998 that required surgery. The operation was botched, causing nerve damage. It was thought that this would force an end of his career and he announced his retirement in November.

=== Toryumon (1997–2003) ===
In 1997, Asai then became a trainer and founded the Último Dragón Gym, where he trained three classes of students, "Toryumon Japan", "Toryumon 2000 Project" (T2P), and "Toryumon X". His first class of students, which included Don Fuji, Dragon Kid, Magnum Tokyo, Cima and Suwa, worked for WCW early in their career. In 1998, Asai began co-promoting Grupo Internacional Revolución (IWRG) based out of Mexico, where he trained several of the top young wrestlers. In 1999, a promotion named Toryumon opened, with the vast majority of the roster having been trained by Asai. Toryumon was later renamed Dragon Gate as Asai parted ways with the promotion. He continued to train students at his gym.

In 2002, Asai underwent another surgery to repair the damage done to his arm in hopes of returning to wrestling. In late 2002 Ultimo Dragon was in talks with World Wrestling Entertainment for another shot at a United States run. To get back into ring shape he returned to action for his T2P and Toryumon Mexico promotions. On November 26, he teamed with former WCW wrestlers Norman Smiley and Perry Saturn in a win against Masaaki Mochizuki, Kenichiro Arai and Toru Owashi for T2P. On December 7 he teamed with Mochizuki and Dragon Kid in a win over the team of Bestia Salvaje, Scorpio Jr. and El Duende for Toryumon Mexico.

=== World Wrestling Entertainment (2003–2004) ===
In the spring of 2003, he signed with World Wrestling Entertainment as the Último Dragón, seeking to realize his two lifelong goals of competing in Madison Square Garden and performing at WrestleMania. He was brought in on the heels of the signing of Rey Mysterio on the belief that he would make as big of an impact as Mysterio did upon his WWE debut. Asai made his WWE debut in dark match victories against Rico, Crash Holly and Shannon Moore as they debuted a series of video packages hyping the debut of Dragon on SmackDown!. He made his WWE television debut at Madison Square Garden on June 26, 2003 episode of SmackDown! in a match with Shannon Moore, where he debuted his finisher, the Asai DDT (a standing shiranui), to the American wrestling audience.

Throughout the summer he competed in a tournament for the WWE United States Championship beating Jamie Noble but losing to eventual winner, Eddie Guerrero. He quickly rebounded by beating Kanyon in a WWE Heat match taped before Vengeance. He then wrestled on WWE Velocity for the next few weeks, leading to a match with Rey Mysterio on SmackDown. Dragon won the match only after Tajiri interfered and showed respect to Dragon due to their Japanese heritage. The next week Dragon teamed with Mysterio to take on Tajiri and Nunzio. After this match, he was not seen on SmackDown! for several months until the build for the Cruiserweight Open at WrestleMania XX. At the event, Dragon participated in the Open. Dragon's WrestleMania resulted in one of WrestleMania's most famous blunders, tripping as he entered the arena from the backstage area and tripping as he was going up the turnbuckle for a pose. The first trip was edited out of the WrestleMania XX DVD, but the second wasn't. After the open, he faced Chavo Guerrero and Nunzio in his last WWE matches. On April 22, 2004, WWE announced that Asai asked for his release from WWE when he knew WWE wanted to unmask him and went back to Japan immediately.

=== Return to Japan (2004–present) ===
One month after being released from WWE, Asai quickly picked up a New Japan tour on May 1, 2004. He returned to Mexico by occasionally wrestling for Consejo Mundial de Lucha Libre (CMLL). He also took part in the short lived Japanese independent promotion Dragondoor, ran by one of his students Noriaki Kawabata using mostly T2P and Toryumon X graduates. He would wrestle in matches against Último Guerrero and various other stars who wrestled in Mexico or Japanese based lucha libre promotions. Since the fall of Dragondoor he went back to Mexico to run another class of the Toryumon school, which has led to some standouts in Hajime Ohara, Kazuchika Okada and Pequeño Ninja. The rest of the Toryumon students along with Asai joined the Tatsumi Fujinami promoted Dradition promotion in Japan. In 2006, Asai began promoting the annual "Toryumon Mexico: Dragon Mania" wrestling show. He also wrestled at UWA Hardcore Wrestling based outside of Toronto, Ontario, Canada. He has wrestled against Sonjay Dutt, M-Dogg 20, Chris Sabin, Alex Shelley, Jyushin Thunder Liger and Black Tiger all in the UWA. Since then he has been working in Japan for various independent promotions such as Pro Wrestling Kageki and Michinoku Pro. He has also been to Mexico as well as in Spain, working for Nu Wrestling Evolution.

On December 15, 2013, Dragón defeated Yoshinobu Kanemaru to win All Japan Pro Wrestling's World Junior Heavyweight Championship. He lost the title to Atsushi Aoki on May 29, 2014. On August 27, 2017, he regained the title by defeating Tajiri. On March 22, 2015, Dragón won another title in All Japan, when he and Kanemaru defeated Mitsuya Nagai and Takeshi Minamino for the All Asia Tag Team Championship. They vacated the title on October 14.

On August 30 and 31, 2014, Dragón participated in a show in Pyongyang, North Korea promoted by the Inoki Genome Federation. He defeated Hajime Ohara on the first day and Heddi French on the second in singles matches.

== Acting career ==
Último Dragón starred in 2008's Bloodstained Memoirs, a non-scripted documentary film also starring Chris Jericho, Rob Van Dam, Mick Foley and Keiji Muto. Último Dragón's scenes were filmed in the UK and Italy. He previously appeared as an actor in La Llave Mortal (1990) and Vampiro, guerrero de la noche (1993).

== Wrestlers trained ==
Wrestlers trained by Último Dragón or at the Último Dragón Gym:

- Ai Fujita
- American Balloon
- Amigo Suzuki
- Angélico
- Anthony W. Mori
- Banana Senga
- Bear Fukuda
- Brahman Kei
- Brahman Shu
- "brother" Yasshi
- Bryan Lee
- Chango
- Cima
- Dan Paysan
- Darkness Dragon
- Derek Wylde
- Don Fujii
- Douki
- Dragon Kid
- Dulce Gardenia
- El Hornet
- Ferist/Passion Hasegawa
- Fujita "Jr." Hayato
- Genki Horiguchi
- Hajime Ohara
- Hanaoka
- Hiromi Horiguchi
- Hiroshi Erikawa
- Hisamaru Tajima
- Joe E. Potter
- Jun Ogawauchi
- Kanjyuro Matsuyama
- Kaz Hayashi
- Kazuchika Okada
- Kagetora
- Keiichi Kawano
- Ken45°
- Ken Ohka
- Kenichiro Arai
- King Danza
- Kinta Tamaoka (referee)
- Kinya Oyanagi
- Kondo & Co.
- Lambo Miura
- Magnum Tokyo
- Manjimaru
- Manuel Bottazzini
- Masa Takanashi
- Masaaki Mochizuki
- Masato Yoshino
- Mentai☆Kid
- Milano Collection A.T.
- Milanito Collection a.t.
- Mini Cima
- Miss Italy
- Mototsugu Shimizu
- Naoki Tanizaki
- Naruki Doi
- Noriaki Kawabata
- Osiris
- Pequeño Ninja
- Philip J. Fukumasa
- Raimu Mishima
- Rasse
- Ryo Saito
- Saito Masuda (never debuted)
- Satoshi Kajiwara
- Shachihoko Machine/Shachihoko Boy
- Shadow Phoenix
- Shogo Takagi
- Shuji Kondo
- Spark Aoki
- Stalker Ichikawa
- Super Shisa
- Susumu Yokosuka
- Suwa
- Tadasuke
- Takashi Okamura
- Taiji Ishimori
- Takeshi Minamino
- Taku Iwasa
- Takuya Murakami
- Takuya Sugawara
- Takayuki Yagi
- Taro Nohashi
- Taru
- Tarucito [I]/Skayde Jr.
- Tarucito [II]/Yasuhiko Dokan (manager)
- Toru Owashi
- Yamada Man Pondo
- Yasushi Kanda

== Championships and accomplishments ==
- All Japan Pro Wrestling
  - World Junior Heavyweight Championship (2 times)
  - All Asia Tag Team Championship (1 time) – with Yoshinobu Kanemaru
- Associate Bitteroise De Catch
  - Coupe Max Soulie (2025)
- Canadian National Wrestling Alliance
  - CNWA National Championship (1 time)
- Consejo Mundial de Lucha Libre
  - NWA World Middleweight Championship (2 times)
- Comision de Box y Lucha D.F.
  - Distrito Federal Trios Championship (1 time) – with Naoki Sano and Hirokazu Hata
- Dragongate
  - Open the Owarai Gate Championship (1 time)
- International Wrestling Revolution Group
  - Copa Higher Power (1998) – with Judo Suwa, Lyguila, Magnum Tokyo, Ryo Saito, Shiima Nobunaga and Sumo Fujii
- International Wrestling Alliance
  - IWA Heavyweight Championship (1 time)
  - IWA Junior Heavyweight Championship (1 time)
- Michinoku Pro Wrestling
  - British Commonwealth Junior Heavyweight Championship (1 time)
  - Tohoku Tag Team Championship (2 times) – with Jinsei Shinzaki (1) and Kesen Numagirolamo (1)
- New Japan Pro-Wrestling
  - IWGP Junior Heavyweight Championship (2 times)
  - J-Crown (1 time)
  - British Commonwealth Junior Heavyweight Championship (1 time)
  - NWA World Junior Heavyweight Championship (1 time)
  - NWA World Welterweight Championship (2 times)
  - UWA World Junior Light Heavyweight Championship (1 time)
  - WAR International Junior Heavyweight Championship (1 time)
  - WWA World Junior Light Heavyweight Championship (1 time)
  - WWF Light Heavyweight Championship (1 time)
- Pro Wrestling Noah
  - Differ Cup (2003) – with Yossino
- Pro Wrestling Illustrated
  - Ranked No. 12 of the top 500 singles wrestlers in the PWI 500 in 1997
  - Ranked No. 61 of the 500 best singles wrestlers of the "PWI Years" in 2003
- Pro Wrestling Revolution
  - PWR World Heavyweight Championship (1 time)
- Tokyo Sports
  - Technique Award (1992)
- Toryumon Mexico
  - NWA International Junior Heavyweight Championship (2 time, final)
  - Yamaha Cup (2008) – with Yutaka Yoshie
  - Yamaha Cup (2012) – with Angélico
  - Suzuki Cup (2007) – with Kensuke Sasaki and Marco Corleone
  - Suzuki Cup (2008) – with Alex Koslov and Marco Corleone
- Universal Wrestling Association
  - UWA World Middleweight Championship (5 times)
  - UWA World Welterweight Championship (1 time)
- World Championship Wrestling
  - WCW Cruiserweight Championship (2 times)
  - WCW World Television Championship (2 times)
- Wrestle And Romance / Wrestle Association R
  - WAR International Junior Heavyweight Championship (2 times)
  - WAR World Six-Man Tag Team Championship (1 time) – with Nobutaka Araya and Genichiro Tenryu
  - Super J Cup 1995 Contestant Decision Tournament (1995) - with Gedo and Lionheart
  - One Night Tag Team Tournament (1995) - with Genichiro Tenryu
- Wrestling Observer Newsletter awards
  - Best Wrestling Maneuver (1996) Running Liger bomb
  - Most Underrated (2003)
  - Wrestling Observer Newsletter Hall of Fame (Class of 2004)

=== Luchas de Apuestas record ===
Winner (wager)	Loser (wager)	Location	Event	Date	Notes
Yoshihiro Asai (career)	Cuchillo (mask and championship)	Tokyo, Japan	UWF live event	June 4, 1990	
Último Dragón (mask)	Dark Dragon (mask)	Barcelona, Spain	NWE live event	June 25, 2008	
Último Dragón (mask)	Hajime Ohara (hair)	Mexico City, Mexico	DragonMania IV	August 22, 2009	
Último Dragón (mask)	Black Tiger V (mask)	Mexico City, Mexico	DragonMania VI	May 14, 2011	
Último Dragón (mask)	Sushi (mask)	Tokyo, Japan	AJPW live event	December 14, 2014	(Note: Tag team match, where Dragón and Masked Burning #2 defeated Sushi and Mr. Christmas. Sushi, as the loser of the fall, was as per stipulation supposed to unmask, but instead Mr. Christmas unmasked, revealing himself as Jun Akiyama.)
Último Dragón (mask)	Tiger Ali (hair)	Mexico City, Mexico	DragonMania X	May 23, 2015	
