= Taku Iwasa =

Japanese professional wrestler

Personal information
- Born: November 15, 1977 (age 48) Sendai-shi, Miyagi Prefecture, Japan

Professional wrestling career
- Ring name(s): Taku Iwasa; Takamichi Iwasa; Michael Iwasa; Iwasanto
- Billed height: 1.78 m (5 ft 10 in)
- Billed weight: 94 kg (207 lb)
- Trained by: Último Dragón; Jorge Rivera
- Debut: September 2, 2000

Taku Iwasa (born November 15, 1977) is a Japanese professional wrestler best known for his work in Dragon Gate.

== Career ==
=== Early ===
Iwasa graduated as part of the Toryumon T2P class. He initially portrayed Takamichi Iwasa, a Satanic character. Injuries derailed his career, and he soon ended up as a jobber to the stars. He was briefly scouted by the famous Crazy MAX stable, and they gave him a ten match trial series. CMAX was never truly interested in Iwasa, though, and he lost all 10 matches.

Following this, he joined forces with Raimu Mishima, who had been exiled from M2K for losing too many matches and general weakness. They petitioned to form their own unit, but were unable to do so. They then left for America to undergo "Warrior Training".

=== The Florida Brothers ===
Upon returning to Toryumon, Iwasa and Mishima proclaimed themselves to be Americans. They changed their first names to Michael and Daniel respectively.

The Florida Brothers were a comedy team. Their routine involved spoofing American southern style wrestling, and winning matches by DQ. Iwasa carried a folding chair painted in a stars and stripes pattern to the ring, and the Floridas would throw the chair to their opponents, then fake having been hit with it. The referee would then DQ their opponents, and the Floridas would leap to their feet and put their hands over their hearts as the American national anthem played. Later, they would add Takayuki Yagi to their shtick. Yagi portrayed a partial referee, dressing in an American Flag motif shirt and wearing oversized sunglasses that he required to see.

Kensuke Sasaki joined the Floridas as a part-time member after losing to them via DQ, and called himself Kenskee whenever he teamed with them.

The Florida Brothers gimmick had run its course in 2006, and Iwasa and Mishima put the gimmick on the line in a match against Stalker Ichikawa. Ichikawa won the match. Iwasa and Mishima went their separate ways. Mishima would leave the company very shortly after, while Iwasa joined the cram school stable Tozawa-juku.

=== Tozawa-juku ===
Akira Tozawa had earlier announced his intention to open a cram school based stable, Tozawa-juku, for wrestlers to get polish and become men. Iwasa was one of his first recruits.

The character change greatly improved Iwasa's rank within Dragon Gate. Instead of returning to the submission style he used as Takamichi Iwasa, he became a power wrestler and renamed himself Taku Iwasa. Later, when Kenichiro Arai joined Tozawa-juku, he and Iwasa began teaming regularly. The two managed to win the WAR I-J Heavyweight Tag Team Titles on September 22, 2007 from Ryo Saito & Susumu Yokosuka, but lost them on October 12 to Naruki Doi & Masato Yoshino in a match that was also to determine the inaugural Open the Twin Gate Champions. On February 8, 2008, Iwasa & Arai would beat Doi & Yoshino for the Open the Twin Gate Titles, and they successfully defended them twice before losing them to Ryo Saito & Susumu Yokosuka on May 5. He would find championship success again the following month, when he, Arai, and newest member Shinobu defeated Shingo Takagi, YAMATO and Gamma on June 28 to capture the latter trio's Open the Triangle Gate Titles. However, they lost the titles in their first defense the month after that, to Yasushi Kanda, YAMATO and Gamma.

On November 16, Tozawa selected him and Arai to challenge Masaaki Mochizuki, Don Fujii & Magnitude Kishiwada for the Open the Triangle Gate titles, but agreed with the champions to end Tozawa-juku if they failed to beat them. Mochizuki and company got the win, bringing about the end of the unit, and he and the other stablemates were given a graduation ceremony.

=== KAMIKAZE ===
Iwasa began a rivalry with Masaaki Mochizuki after swearing revenge on him for causing the end of Tozawa-juku. They faced off in a second round match in the King of Gate Tournament in December, where Mochizuki had promised that he would show Iwasa's one "fundamental flaw." Mochizuki won, and afterwards, he told Iwasa that his "fundamental flaw" was that he had been a tag team wrestler for so long that he had forgotten how to wrestle on his own, and would have to re-learn how.

During this rivalry, he and Tozawa started teaming with Shingo Takagi in the weeks following the unit's demise, and on December 19, they agreed to the formation of a new unit with Takagi and Dragon Kid. On December 28, he fought Mochizuki for a second time, but lost to him again. Then, later in the night, when Naruki Doi won the Open the Dream Gate Title from Takagi on December 28, Iwasa came to him demanding a title shot, but was initially turned down because, according to Doi, he had not won anything in singles competition. However, on January 11, 2009, Iwasa was given the title shot for February 8, and the unit he was in was finally given a name: KAMIKAZE. Despite a valiant effort against Doi, he was not able to win the Dream Gate from him, but a week later, he, Shingo Takagi & Dragon Kid would win the Open the Triangle Gate titles from Masaaki Mochizuki, Don Fujii & Magnitude Kishiwada, where he pinned Mochizuki, gaining a measure of revenge on him. He, Takagi, and Dragon Kid would lose the titles to CIMA, Gamma & KAGETORA on April 15.

In mid-2009, Iwasa abruptly announced his retirement. His stablemates protested and Iwasa relented, but still decided to take an undisclosed amount of time off to heal. He has not set a timetable for his return. He made a one shot appearance in May 2010 where he appealed to Takagi to not secede from KAMIKAZE and helped the various members of the stable reconcile their differences.

On March 1, 2011, Iwasa announced that he would be making a return from his 18 month hiatus on March 20, which was later postponed to April 12. In his return match Iwasa and Cyber Kong were defeated by Don Fujii and Super Shisa. In May, Takagi disbanded KAMIKAZE.

Iwasa never returned to a full-time wrestling schedule. He has not wrestled since 2012.

== Factions ==
- Tozawa-juku (2006–2008)
- Kamikaze (2008–2011)

== Championships and accomplishments ==
- Dragon Gate
  - Dragon Gate I-J Heavyweight Tag Team Championship (1 time) - with Kenichiro Arai
  - Dragon Gate Open the Triangle Gate Championship (2 times) - with Kenichiro Arai and Shinobu (1), and Shingo Takagi and Dragon Kid (1)
  - Dragon Gate Open the Twin Gate Championship (1 time) - with Kenichiro Arai
