= Dragongate =

Japanese professional wrestling promotion company

- Founded: July 5, 2004
- Style: Puroresu; Lucha Libre
- Headquarters: Kobe, Japan
- Founder: Takashi Okamura
- Owner: Toru Kido
- Sister: Dragon Gate USA (2009–2015); Dragon Gate UK (2009–2014)
- Split from: Toryumon Japan
- Website: www.gaora.co.jp/dragongate/

Dragongate (DRAGONGATE株式会社, DRAGONGATE Kabushiki-gaisha; formerly Dragon Gate and currently promoted as Dragongate Japan Pro-Wrestling (ドラゴンゲート・ジャパン・プロレスリング, Doragongēto Japan puroresuringu)) is a Japanese professional wrestling promotion founded and headquartered in Kobe, Hyōgo, Japan.

The byproduct of the original Japanese Toryumon (闘龍門, Tōryūmon) promotion founded by Último Dragón, it is considered one of the current five major wrestling promotions in Japan. The promotion is based on a junior heavyweight style with varying emphasis on high flying maneuvers, flashy technical grappling, and submission wrestling. In its founding, and continuous to this day, Dragongate runs on a faction-based roster system, with the main heel stable(s) being derived from the previous, and face stables coming and going as time goes on.

Dragongate is currently owned by CEO Toru Kido as of 2018, and is a member of the United Japan Pro-Wrestling association.

== History ==
On July 4, 2004, Último Dragón departed from the Toryumon Gym and seized ownership of the "Toryumon" trademarks. The Toryumon Japan promotion subsequently restructured and changed its name to Dragon Gate. Dragon Gate declared Cima (the last one to hold the Último Dragón Gym Championship) to be the inaugural Open the Dream Gate Champion, thus making him the first champion in the promotion's history.

Dragon Gate would make a TV deal to air on Gaora TV, who was also a shareholder of All Japan Pro Wrestling after Motoko Baba sold the rights to the company and gave her power to Keiji Muto. Dragon Gate TV's first episode aired live on July 16, 2004. AJPW TV episodes would also air commercials advertising Dragon Gate's TV debut and would frequently promote future Dragon Gate shows during AJPW commercials, despite there being little interpromotional crossover of AJPW and Dragon Gate in their events. Dragon Gate TV would use an anime intro depicting their wrestlers, the intro's art style being a blend of mainstream anime with Fujiko Fujio-esque animation.

Since its founding, Dragon Gate wrestlers have also made appearances on the United States independent wrestling circuit, including Ring of Honor which held a Dragon Gate Invasion show on August 27, 2005, in Buffalo, New York, Dragon Gate Challenge on March 30, 2006, in Detroit, Michigan and Supercard of Honor and Better Than Our Best in Chicago, Illinois on March 31 and April 1, 2006, respectively. A six-man match pitting Cima, Naruki Doi and Masato Yoshino against Dragon Kid, Ryo Saito and Genki Horiguchi at Supercard of Honor is one of only a handful of North American matches that wrestling journalist Dave Meltzer has given a five-star rating. Both Ring of Honor's All Star Extravaganza III on March 30 and Supercard of Honor II on March 31, 2007, in Detroit, Michigan featured Dragon Gate in the main events.

On October 12, 2007 Baseball Magazine Sha, the publisher of Weekly Pro-Wrestling released Dragon Gate trading cards.

In 2008, Dragon Gate promoted their first set of shows in the United States. The first show took place in Los Angeles on September 5 and featured El Generico, Necro Butcher, and Kendo. Their second show was in Hawaii on September 8.

Japan's Dragon Gate promotion announced its expansion into the United States with Dragon Gate USA on April 14, 2009, at the Korakuen Hall event in Tokyo.

Also in 2009 it was announced that they created another branch promotion Dragon Gate UK. Their first show was held on November 1, 2009, in Oxford, England.

On March 21, 2018, Dragon Gate announced the creation of Dragon Gate Network, an on-demand service similar to WWE Network and New Japan Pro-Wrestling World. The service officially launched on April 1, 2018. On May 7, 2018, Okamura left his job as president. Toru Kido became the new president and Cima became the President of Dragon Gate Inc., the international department with the headquarter in Shanghai, China. In 2019, the promotion celebrated its 20th anniversary. As part of the celebration Último Dragón returned to the promotion in July as a senior advisor. Afterwards, the promotion changed its logo and its parent company Dragon Entertainment would be known as Dragongate Inc. Within the time of all the changes of the promotion, they started to use the combined Dragongate moniker as its official romaji name.

On February 1, 2020, Dragongate announced a working relationship with American promotion Major League Wrestling (MLW), which would include a talent-exchange between the two promotions.

On December 15, 2023, Dragongate was announced as one of the founding members of the United Japan Pro-Wrestling alliance, a joint effort to further develop professional wrestling in Japan through promotion and organization, with Seiji Sakaguchi being named as the chairman of the project.

== Features ==
=== Dragongate Network ===
Dragongate Network is a subscription-based video streaming service owned by Japanese professional wrestling promotion Dragongate. Development of the on-demand service was announced on March 21, 2018. Dragongate Network was officially launched on April 1, 2018. It operates similarly to WWE Network, New Japan Pro-Wrestling's NJPW World and most notably Ring of Honor's Honor Club, in that pay-per-view events are available to stream through the service, but unlike its aforementioned competitors, some membership tiers must pay extra for these events.

The service currently includes a Dragongate PPV archive and past pay-per-view events and access to all future pay-per-view events and the Dragongate Studio which includes the Prime Zone events with no additional costs for monthly subscription price of ¥1,500, as well as access to the Dragongate and Toryumon Japan video tape archive.

=== Trueborn (Dragongate Dojo) ===
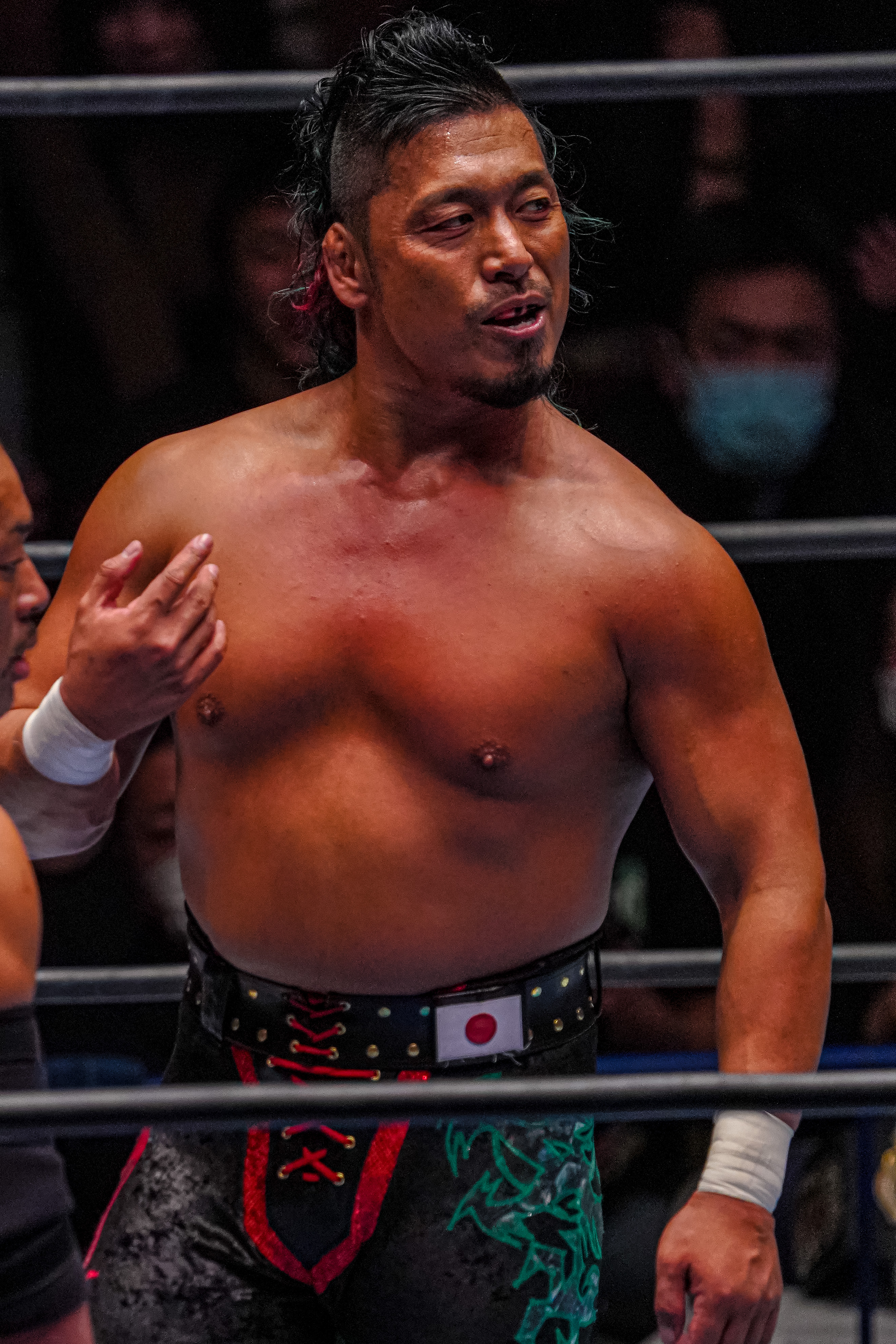
Shingo Takagi

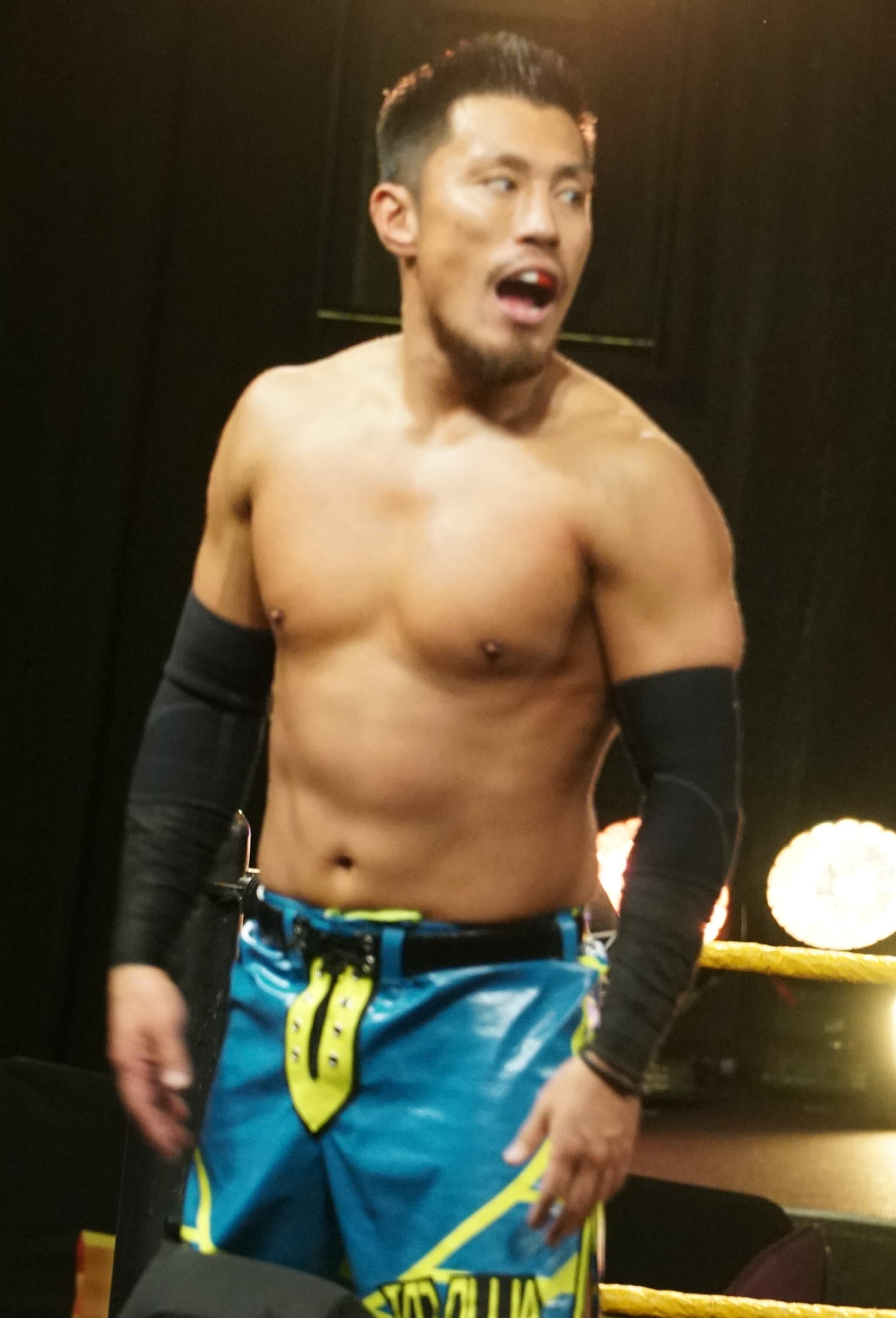
Akira Tozawa

The following is a list of Japanese wrestlers who have graduated from the Dragongate Dojo in Kobe, along with the USA Dojo in Houston, Texas. Graduates are regarded as Trueborn, having been trained in the Dragon System exclusively through Dragongate as opposed to the Último Dragón Gym. They are listed in alphabetical order.

==== List of wrestlers graduated ====
Ring name	Real name	Years Active	Current Company
Akira Tozawa	Akira Tozawa	2005 – Present	WWE
Ben-K	Futa Nakamura	2016 – Present	Dragongate
Big R Shimizu	Ryotsu Shimizu	2013 – Present	Dragongate
B×B Hulk	Terumasa Ishihara	2005 – Present	Dragongate
Cyber Kong / Takashi Yoshida	Takashi Yoshida	2006 – Present	Dragongate
Dragon Dia	Undisclosed	2018 – Present	Dragongate
Eita	Eita Kobayashi	2011 – Present	Pro Wrestling Noah
Hyo	Hyo Watanabe	2016 – Present	Dragongate
Ishin	Ishin Iihashi	2021 – Present	Dragongate
Jacky Kamei	Taketo Kamei	2019 – Present	Dragongate
Katsuo	Yūki Ōno	2005 – Present	Hokuto Pro
Kenshin Chikano	Kenshin Chikano	2008 – Present	Dove Pro
Kota Minoura	Kota Minoura	2018 – Present	Dragongate
Kotoka	Kotoka Shiiba	2009 – 2018	Retired
Jackson Florida	Kouji Shishido	2006 – 2012	Retired
Kzy	Kazuki Sawada	2006 – Present	Dragongate
Lupin Matsutani	Kei Matsutani	2006 – 2008	Retired
Madoka Kikuta	Madoka Kikuta	2020 – Present	Dragongate
Mondai Ryu	Daisuke Kimata	2006 – Present	Dragongate
Punch Tominaga	Chihiro Tominaga	2011 – Present	Dragongate
Riiita	Takumi Hayakawa	2021 – Present	Dragongate
Shingo Takagi	Shin Takagi	2004 – Present	New Japan Pro-Wrestling
Shun Skywalker	Shun Watanabe	2015 – Present	New Japan Pro-Wrestling
Strong Machine J	Undisclosed	2019 – Present	Dragongate
T-Hawk	Takuya Onodera	2010 – Present	Gleat
U-T	Yūta Tanaka	2013 – Present	Dragongate
Yamato	Masato Onodera	2006 – Present	Dragongate
Yosuke♡Santa Maria	Yosuke Watanabe	2006 – Present	Dragongate
Yo-Hey	Yohei Fujita	2008 – Present	Pro Wrestling Noah

== Championships ==
=== Current championships ===
Championship	Current champion(s)	Reign	Date won	Days held	Location	Notes
Open the Dream Gate Championship	Yoshiki Kato	1	October 2, 2026	44+	Tokyo, Japan	Defeated Kzy at The Gate Of Victory 2026.
Open the Brave Gate Championship	Homare	1	November 5, 2026	10+	Tokyo, Japan	Defeated Dragon Kid in a tournament final to win the vacant title at The Gate Of Evolution 2026
Open the Owarai Gate Championship	Shin Sakura Hirota	1	May 31, 2026	168+	Tokyo, Japan	Defeated Yosuke Santa Maria at Marvelous.
Open the Twin Gate Championship	Paradox (Kagetora and Susumu Yokosuka)	4 (4, 9)	November 15, 2026	0+	Yokosuka, Japan	Defeated Gajadokuro (Ishin and Yoshiki Kato) at The Gate Of Evolution. Kagetora and Yokosuka previously won the titles as Jimmyz (Jimmy Kagetora and Jimmy Susumu).
Open the Triangle Gate Championship	XenisS (El Cielo, Kota Minoura and Yuki Yoshioka)	1 (1, 5, 1)	November 5, 2026	10+	Tokyo, Japan	Defeated Love And Peace (Hyo, Jacky Kamei and Riiita) at The Gate Of Evolution 2026.

=== Defunct Championships ===
Championship	Last champion(s)	Date won
I-J Heavyweight Championship	Masaaki Mochizuki	November 23, 2006
I-J Heavyweight Tag Team Championship	Muscle Outlaw'z (Naruki Doi and Masato Yoshino)	October 12, 2007
Open the Owarai Twin Gate Championship	Don Fujii and Kikutaro	April 12, 2009
Open the Freedom Gate Championship	Timothy Thatcher	July 10, 2015
Open the United Gate Championship	Rich Swann and Johnny Gargano	May 30, 2015

_{(I-J Heavyweight Tag Team Championship unified with Open the Twin Gate Championship on October 12, 2007)}

== Events ==
=== Tournaments ===
Tournament	Latest winner(s)	Date won	Location	Notes
King of Gate	Gianni Valletta	December 3, 2025	Tokyo	Defeated Ishin in the tournament final.
Rey de Parejas	El Cielo and Luis Mante	September 3, 2026	Kobe	Defeated Kota Minoura and Yuki Yoshioka in the tournament final.

=== Dragon Gate Nex ===
Dragon Gate Nex was a project of Dragongate, which gave young wrestlers of the promotion more experience.

In mid-2006, the Nex project was announced. It would be a series of shows and events that would focus primarily on the recent graduates of the Dragon Gate Dojo, allowing for them to further gain experience in ability while also being seen as the main attraction of a show. Virtually all of the shows take place in the Dragon Gate Arena, the main training ring at the Dragon Gate offices in Kobe, Hyogo, Japan.

In addition to the recent graduates, comedy characters, gaijin talent, and any freelance wrestler currently on tour in Japan would also compete on these shows. The occasional main card member of the roster would compete as well. This was done to further enhance the experience to be gained for the trainees and teach the outsiders how to compete in the Dragon System of wrestling.

The vast majority of Nex shows were called "Sanctuary" and were held twice a month. They generally drew an attendance of around 90 fans due to the limited size and space of the venue. There were also special event shows called "Premium," which were the equivalent in atmosphere to a pay-per-view. These shows involved the main card members of the roster and would draw up to 100 in attendance. Early in NEX, they ran two anniversary shows at Shin-Kiba 1st RING in Tokyo, Japan, although this has since been discontinued.

== Affiliates ==
Promotion name	Location	Partnered on	Ref.	Notes
Dragon Gate USA	United States	2009		Closed in 2015 and purchased by WWE in 2020.
Dragon Gate UK	United Kingdom	2009		Never officially closed but has not promoted events since 2014.

== Broadcasters ==
=== Current ===
Domestic:

- Gaora (2004–present, broadcasting monthly shows and live specials and taped shows of Dragon Gate Infinity)
- MBS TV (2018–present, currently broadcasting weekly highlights show Cutting Edge Battle Dragon Gate)
- SKY PerfecTV! (2017–present, currently broadcasting live pay-per-view events)
- Nico Nico Douga (2016–present, streaming untelevised spot-shows and interviews)

Worldwide:

- Dragongate Network (2018–present, streaming service, in partnership with Gaora, broadcasting most Dragongate shows live, as well as on-demand classic)

=== Former ===
- Fighting TV Samurai

== See also ==
- Gate of Destiny
- Professional wrestling in Japan
- List of professional wrestling promotions in Japan
