= AR Fox =

American professional wrestler

- Fox at Death Before Dishonor 2026

Personal information
- Born: Thomas James Ballester; September 5, 1987 (age 39) Ansonia, Connecticut, U.S.

Professional wrestling career
- Ring name(s): Ampliflyer; AR Fox; Dante Fox; R. J. Fox
- Billed height: 6 ft 0 in (183 cm)
- Billed weight: 200 lb (91 kg)
- Billed from: Ansonia, Connecticut
- Trained by: Mr. Hughes
- Debut: 2007

Thomas James Ballester (born September 5, 1987), better known by his ring name AR Fox, is an American professional wrestler and trainer. He is signed to All Elite Wrestling (AEW) and its sister promotion Ring of Honor (ROH), where he is a former one-time ROH World Television Champion. He currently serves as the head trainer of the WWA4 wrestling school in Atlanta, Georgia. He is best known for his work in promotions like Combat Zone Wrestling (CZW), Dragon Gate USA, and Evolve.

== Early life ==
Growing up in Ansonia, Connecticut, Ballester studied Bruce Lee tapes and eventually channeled his love of doing backflips, handstands and scaling walls into backyard wrestling. Fox worked for a brief time at Big Y World Class Market, a grocery store, that he left shortly after finding popularity in wrestling.

== Professional wrestling career ==
=== Early career (2007–2010) ===
In 2007, Ballester turned his backyard wrestling hobby into a career in professional wrestling, debuting after being trained by Curtis "Mr." Hughes at his World Wrestling Alliance 4 (WWA4) promotion's wrestling school in Atlanta, Georgia. He later also underwent further training in WWE's developmental territory Florida Championship Wrestling (FCW). Originally working under the ring name "Ampliflyer", Ballester spent the next couple of years working minor promotions on the American independent circuit including WWA4 and Prime Time Pro Wrestling (PTPW). Ballester eventually adopted the ring name "AR Fox", feeling that due to his small size, he needed to "outfox" his opponents to gain an advantage.

=== Combat Zone Wrestling (2010–2014) ===
Ballester, as AR Fox, made his debut for Combat Zone Wrestling (CZW) on February 13, 2010, losing to Aaron Arbo in an "Opportunity Knocks" three-way match, which also included Unbreakable Andy. After teaming with Chip Day in a tag team loss against Zero Gravity (Brett Gakiya and CJ Esparza) on March 27, Fox picked up his first win in CZW on April 10, when he defeated Aaron Arbo and Unbreakable Andy in another three-way match. Fox then entered a storyline, where it was rumored that CZW officials did not believe he had what it took to be a wrestler for the promotion. On September 10, Fox defeated Alex Colon, Facade, Ricochet, Ruckus and tHURTeen in to win the Chris Cash Aerial Assault ladder match and become the number one contender to the CZW World Junior Heavyweight Championship. However, he would go on to fail in his title challenge against Adam Cole on October 9. After defeating Alex Colon on November 13, Fox was granted another shot at the title on December 11, but was again defeated by Cole, following interference from his new manager, Mia Yim. On March 12, 2011, Fox defeated Alex Colon and Ryan McBride in a three-way match to qualify for the Best of the Best X tournament. He entered the tournament on April 9, but was eliminated by Sami Callihan in a first round three-way match, which included Jake Crist. Despite his early elimination, Fox earned praise from Callihan, who named him the "people's choice", giving him the People's Choice Award he had won himself. This effectively ended the story, where CZW officials were doubting Fox's abilities.

On April 10, 2011, Fox defeated Alex Colon, Jonathan Gresham, Ryan McBride, Ryan Slater and Ty Hagen in a six-way match to earn another shot at the CZW World Junior Heavyweight Championship. On May 14, Fox faced Adam Cole for the third match between the two for the CZW World Junior Heavyweight Championship. After debuting his new finishing maneuver, Lo Mein Pain, Fox had the match won when CZW owner D. J. Hyde entered the ring and hit him with a lariat, leading to Cole retaining his title. At the following event on June 11, Fox won his first title in CZW, when he defeated Drew Gulak for the CZW Wired TV Championship. However, he would lose the title to Jake Crist in his first title defense on July 9. On October 7, Fox received his first shot at the CZW World Heavyweight Championship, but was defeated by the defending champion, Devon Moore. From November 5 to 12, Fox took part in a single-elimination tournament to determine the number one contender to the CZW World Junior Heavyweight Championship, and in the end, he defeated Ryan McBride to win the tournament. On December 3 at Cage of Death 13, Fox unsuccessfully challenged new World Junior Heavyweight Champion Sami Callihan for his title.

On April 14, Fox took part in the Best of the Best 11 tournament. After wins over A. C. H. and Lince Dorado in a three-way match, and Samuray del Sol in a semifinal match, Fox was defeated in the finals of the tournament by Sami Callihan. Winning the Best of the Best 11 People's Choice Award, Fox was granted the right to challenge for any CZW title whenever he wanted. On July 14, Fox unsuccessfully challenged Masada for the CZW World Heavyweight Championship. Later that same event, Fox used his title challenge right and challenged Sami Callihan to a match for the CZW World Junior Heavyweight Championship, immediately after he had regained it from Drake Younger. In the end, Fox was victorious, finally winning the World Junior Heavyweight Championship for the first time. After a successful title defense against Alex Colon on August 11, Fox defeated Dave Crist on September 8 in a ladder match to not only retain the World Junior Heavyweight Championship, but to also win the CZW Wired TV Championship for the second time. Following the match, the World Junior Heavyweight Championship was retired with Fox recognized as the final champion. On November 10, Fox made his first defense of the Wired TV Championship, defeating Lucky 13, Rich Swann and Shane Strickland in a four-way match. On December 8 at Cage of Death XIV, Fox successfully defended the CZW Wired TV Championship against a surprise opponent, the returning Robert Anthony. On March 9, 2013, at the Wanted internet pay-per-view, Fox made another successful defense of the title against Azrieal. On March 31, Fox successfully defended the title against Flamita at a Desastre Total Ultraviolento (DTU) event in Mexico City. On April 13, Fox entered the Best of the Best XII tournament, defeating Andrew Everett and Uhaa Nation in his first round match. After defeating Tommy End in his semifinal match, Fox was defeated in the finals of the tournament by Alex Colon. On May 11, Fox teamed with Athena in the 2013 Queen and King of the Ring tournament, which CZW co-promoted with the Women Superstars Uncensored (WSU) promotion. After wins over Ezavel Suena and Latin Dragon, and Addy Starr and Matt Tremont, Fox and Athena defeated Drew Gulak and Kimber Lee in the finals to win the tournament. On September 14, Fox lost the Wired TV Championship to Alex Colon in a four-way ladder match, which also included Andrew Everett and Shane Strickland. On February 8, 2014, at CZW's 15th anniversary event, Fox defeated Blk Jeez, Chris Dickinson and Drake Younger in a four-way match to become the number one contender to the CZW World Heavyweight Championship. Fox received his title shot on March 8, but was defeated by the defending champion, Drew Gulak.

=== Dragon Gate USA and Evolve (2010–2015) ===
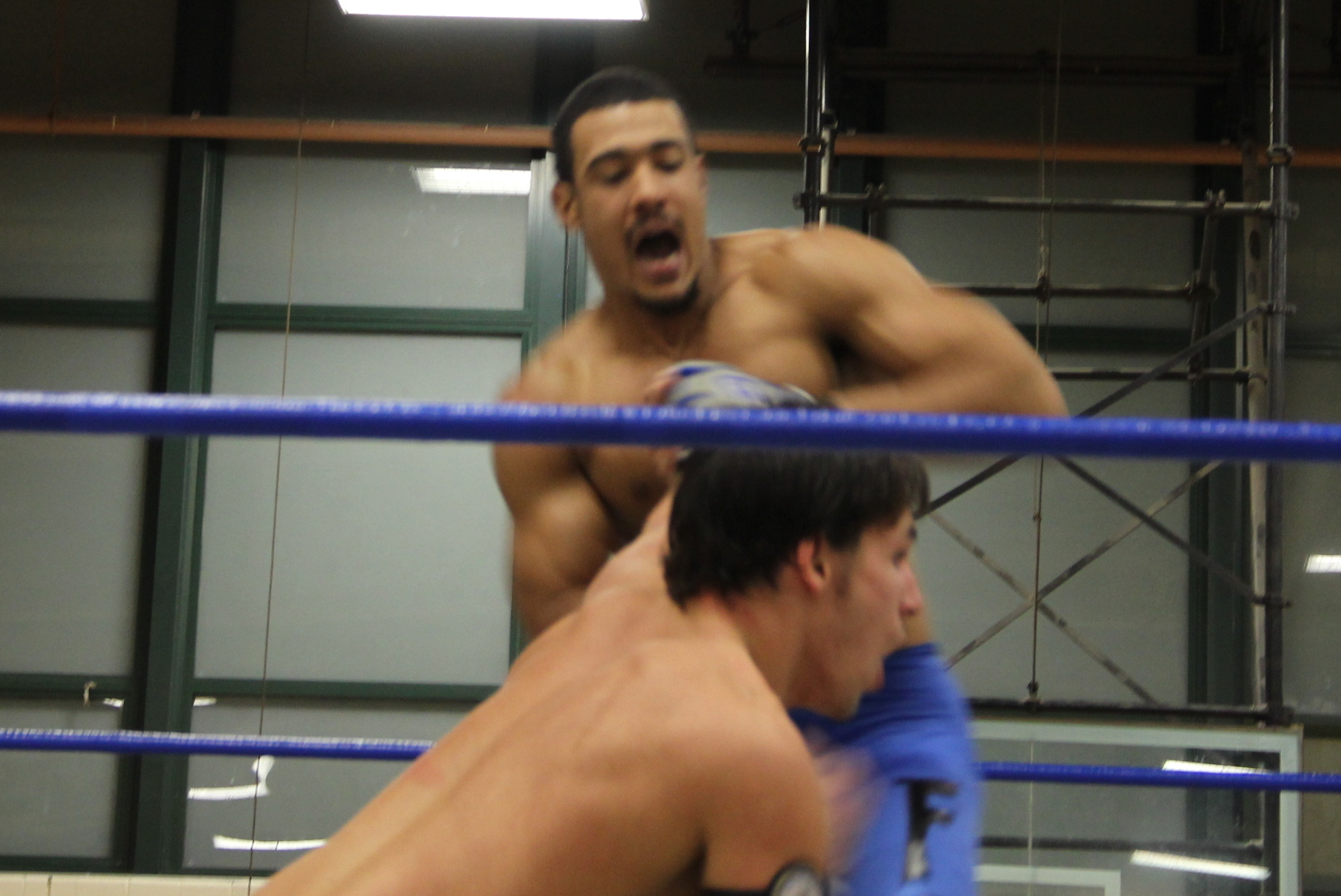
Fox in the ring with Chuck Taylor

On November 20, 2010, Fox made his debut for the Evolve promotion, defeating Rich Swann, Scott Reed and Tony Nese in a four-way match. On January 29, 2011, Fox made his debut for Evolve's close affiliate, Dragon Gate USA, losing to Sami Callihan in a six-way match. The following day, Fox defeated Cheech for his first win in Dragon Gate USA. On May 20, Fox defeated Rich Swann, Jon Davis and Sami Callihan during a one-night tournament to win Evolve's inaugural Style Battle tournament. After a series of multi-man matches, Fox wrestled his, up to that point, highest profile Dragon Gate USA match on June 4, where he was defeated by Akira Tozawa.

On June 5, Fox defeated Pinkie Sanchez at Dragon Gate USA's second anniversary event, after which he was beaten down by Sanchez and his D.U.F. (Dirty Ugly Fucks) stablemates Arik Cannon and Sami Callihan, starting his first storyline rivalry in the promotion. In July, Fox made his first trip to Japan for a tour with Dragon Gate USA's parent promotion, Dragon Gate. He made his debut on July 23, when he teamed with Junction Three members Gamma and Masato Yoshino in a six-man tag team match, where they were defeated by the Blood Warriors trio of Genki Horiguchi, Naruki Doi and Yasushi Kanda. During the rest of the tour, which lasted until August 8, Fox continued working mainly against the Blood Warriors stable. Back in Dragon Gate USA on September 10, Fox teamed with the debuting veteran wrestler Sabu to defeat Cannon and Sanchez in a No Disqualification match. The following day, D.U.F. came back, in the form of Callihan and Cannon, to defeat Fox and Yamato in a tag team match. On November 13, Fox, Jon Davis and Sabu were defeated in a six-man "Extreme Warfare" main event by Callihan, Cannon and Sanchez, with Callihan pinning Fox for the win. Fox started off his 2012 by losing to Callihan in an Anything Goes Tables match on January 27. On May 11, Fox returned to Evolve, which was now unified with Dragon Gate USA, defeating Callihan in a main event grudge match. The following day at Evolve 13, Fox defeated Jigsaw, Ricochet and Samuray del Sol in the opening match to earn a shot at the Open the Freedom Gate Championship later in the main event. Fox then went on to fail in his title challenge against the defending champion, Johnny Gargano.

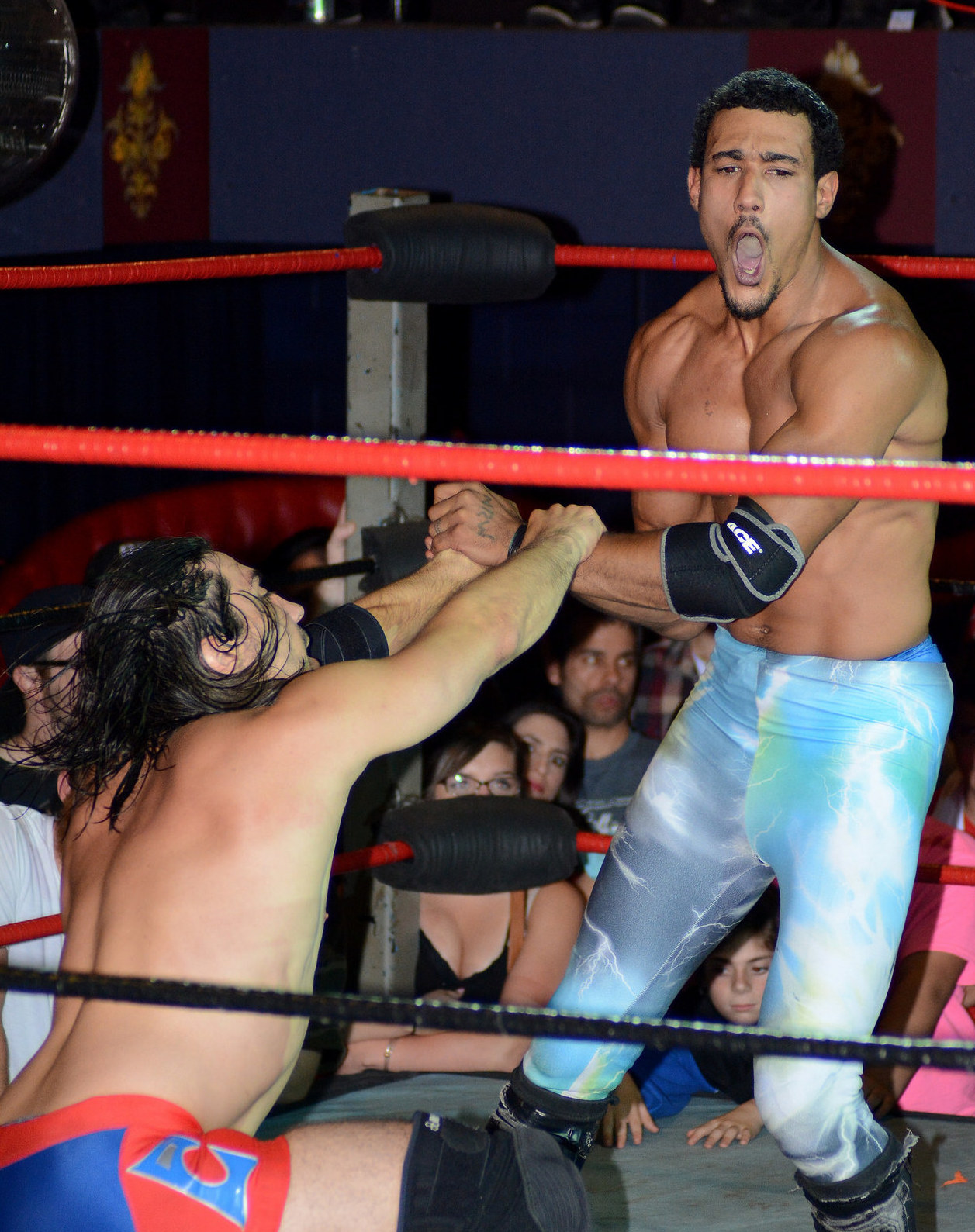
Fox in the ring with Paul London

Back in Dragon Gate USA in July 2012, Fox formed a tag team with Cima, who had been told to find a partner for an upcoming Open the United Gate Championship match. The two defeated El Generico and Samuray del Sol in their first match together on July 28. The following day, Fox and Cima defeated Rich Swann and Ricochet to win the vacant Open the United Gate Championship. On October 6, Fox started his second tour with Dragon Gate with a win over Jimmy Kagetora. During the tour, which lasted until October 28, Fox and Cima successfully defended the Open the United Gate Championship, first against World-1 International representatives Masato Yoshino and Naruki Doi on October 7, and then against Jimmyz representatives Jimmy Susumu and Mr. Kyu Kyu Toyonaka Dolphin on October 8. Upon his return to Dragon Gate USA, Fox defeated Ricochet in a main event on November 2; as a result, Ricochet was forced to tell Fox that he respected him. The following day, Fox and Cima defeated Genki Horiguchi and Ryo Saito to retain the Open the United Gate Championship. On November 4, Fox received another shot at the Open the Freedom Gate Championship in a four-way elimination match with champion Johnny Gargano, Akira Tozawa and Ricochet. Fox was the first man eliminated from the match by Ricochet. On April 5, 2013, Fox defeated Jon Davis, Ricochet and Sami Callihan during a one-night single-elimination tournament to become the inaugural Evolve Champion. The following night at Open the Ultimate Gate 2013, Fox and Cima lost the Open the United Gate Championship to The Young Bucks (Matt Jackson and Nick Jackson). On May 30 at Evolve 20, Fox made his first successful defense of the Evolve Championship against Nick Jackson. Two days later at Evolve 22, Fox defeated Lince Dorado for his second successful title defense. On July 28 at Enter the Dragon 2013, Dragon Gate USA's fourth anniversary event, Fox was defeated by Trent Beretta in a non-title match. Immediately afterwards, Fox agreed to defend the Evolve Championship against Beretta and defeated him to make his third successful title defense. Post-match, Fox was attacked by Mr. A and Su Yung, whose managee Anthony Nese he then defeated on September 21 at Evolve 23 for his fourth successful defense of the Evolve Championship. The following day at Evolve 24, Fox ended his rivalry with Ricochet by defeating him in an "Evolution's End" match. On November 16, Fox made his fifth successful defense of the Evolve Championship in a four-way match against Fire Ant, Mr. Touchdown and Shane Strickland. On January 10, 2014, Fox made another successful title defense against Davey Richards. Fox's next two title defenses took place during Dragon Gate USA's February events. After successfully defending the title against Drew Gulak on February 22, Fox lost the title to Chris Hero in his eighth title defense the following day. In November, Fox took part in Dragon Gate USA's parent company WWNLive's tour of China, during which he unsuccessfully challenged Ricochet for the Open the Freedom Gate Championship on November 14 and Rich Swann for the FIP World Heavyweight Championship on November 16. On March 26, 2015, Fox received another shot at the Open the Freedom Gate Championship, but was again defeated by Johnny Gargano. On April 8, 2015, Fox announced his departure from WWNLive due to lack of communication with the office regarding future bookings.

=== Independent circuit (2010–present) ===
On December 3, 2010, Fox made his debut for Full Impact Pro (FIP), unsuccessfully challenging Jon Moxley for the FIP World Heavyweight Championship. This was followed by Fox also unsuccessfully challenging Craig Classic for the NWA World Junior Heavyweight Championship on March 19, 2011. On October 28, Fox picked up his first win in FIP, when he defeated Jake Manning in the first round of the 2011 Jeff Peterson Memorial Cup. The following day, Fox defeated Flip Kendrick, Bobby Fish and finally Johnny Gargano to win the entire tournament. On February 1, 2013, FIP held its first event in fifteen months, which saw AR Fox being defeated by Jon Davis in the main event for the vacant FIP World Heavyweight Championship. On March 22, Fox made his debut for Southern California-based Pro Wrestling Guerrilla (PWG) during the promotion's All Star Weekend 9, teaming with Samuray del Sol in a tag team match, where they were defeated by the Inner City Machine Guns (Rich Swann and Ricochet). The following day, Fox teamed with the Inner City Machine Guns in a six-man tag team match, where they were defeated by Brian Cage, Kevin Steen and Michael Elgin. On March 29, Fox made his debut for the Mexican AAA promotion, teaming with Dr. Cerebro and Eterno in a six-man tag team match, where they were defeated by Crazy Boy, Joe Líder and Willie Mack. On June 8, Fox made his debut for Chilean promotion Chile Lucha Libre (CLL), defeating Beto Velez, Bunny and Sito King in a four-way main event to become the inaugural CLL International All Star Champion. On August 30, Fox returned to PWG to take part in the 2013 Battle of Los Angeles, but was eliminated from the tournament in his first round match by Roderick Strong. From October 3 to 6, Fox took part in Westside Xtreme Wrestling's (wXw) 2013 World Triangle League, which also marked his debut for the German promotion. Fox finished his tournament with a record of one win and two losses, failing to advance from his block. On September 20, 2014, Fox made his debut for Chikara, entering the Rey de Voladores tournament and losing to The Great Sanada in a four-way match, which also included Amasis and Orlando Christopher. On June 20, 2015, Fox made his debut for Ring of Honor (ROH), working in a dark match at a Ring of Honor Wrestling taping. On July 10, Fox made his debut for Global Force Wrestling (GFW), defeating Aaron Draven and Chuck Taylor in a three-way match. At WWNLive Mercury Rising, an event promoted by WWNLive on April 5, 2019, he teamed up with The Skulk stablemates Adrian Alanis and Leon Ruff in a losing effort against Damnation (Daisuke Sasaki, Soma Takao and Tetsuya Endo).

=== Lucha Underground (2016–2018) ===
In March 2016, Fox started working for Lucha Underground as Dante Fox, a storyline military friend of Killshot, who had supposedly been killed in combat. Fox feuded with Killshot until June 25 and the season three concluding Ultima Lucha Tres event, where he was defeated by Killshot in a "Hell of War" match. The following day, Fox and Killshot, having seemingly made up, teamed with Willie Mack to win the Lucha Underground Trios Championship.

=== All Elite Wrestling / Ring of Honor (2022–present) ===
In October 2022, AR Fox began making appearances for All Elite Wrestling (AEW) on their AEW Dark and AEW Dark: Elevation programs. He picked up his first victory against Serpentico on the November 9 edition of Dark: Elevation. Fox made his AEW Dynamite debut on November 16, 2022, forming a trio with Top Flight (Dante Martin and Darius Martin) in a losing effort to Death Triangle. On November 30, it was reported AR Fox officially signed with AEW. Fox also makes sporadic appearances in AEW's sister promotion Ring of Honor (ROH), usually teaming with Top Flight in trios matches against various opponents.

Following a loss to Orange Cassidy in a match for the AEW International Championship on the July 26, 2023 episode of Dynamite, AR Fox joined the Mogul Embassy after helping Swerve Strickland defeat Darby Allin, turning heel in the process. On the August 23 episode of Dynamite, Strickland kicked Fox out of Mogul Embassy after the duo were defeated by Allin and Nick Wayne in a tag team match, turning face once again in the process. On the November 4 episode of AEW Collision, Fox was defeated by Strickland. Fox would spend the majority of 2023 and 2024 wrestling on Collision, AEW Rampage, and ROH HonorClub.

On May 9, 2026 (aired May 14) at ROH Supercard Showdown, Fox defeated Nick Wayne to win the ROH World Television Championship, marking his first championship in AEW/ROH. The following night at Supercard of Honor, Fox successfully defended his title against "Blackheart" Lio Rush. On June 13 (aired June 18) at Global Wars, Fox lost his title to Rush in a three-way match that involved Action Andretti, ending his reign at 33 days (though ROH recognizes his reign at 35 days).

== Personal life ==
Ballester was married in June 2015.

== Championships and accomplishments ==
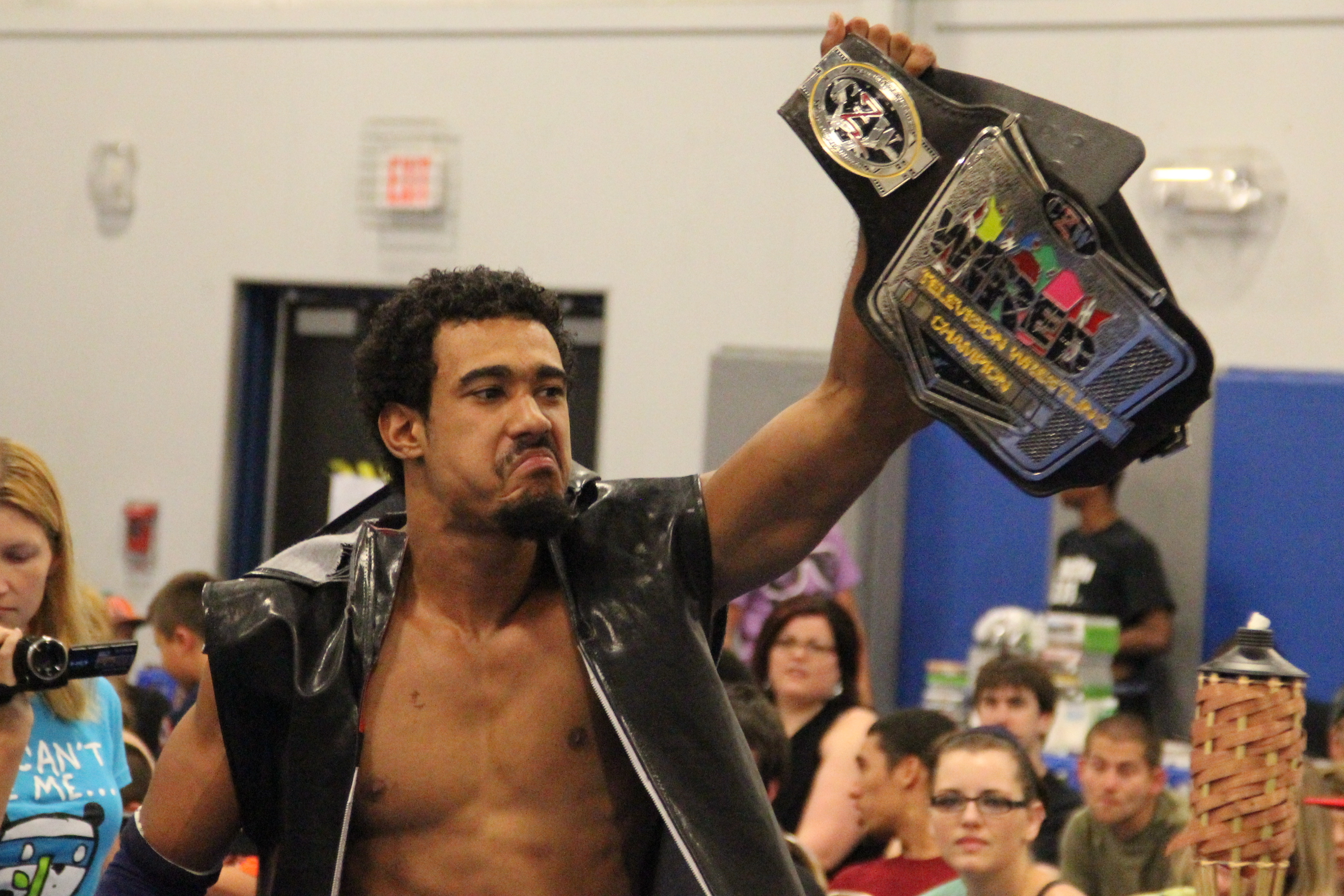
Fox is a three-time CZW Wired TV Champion

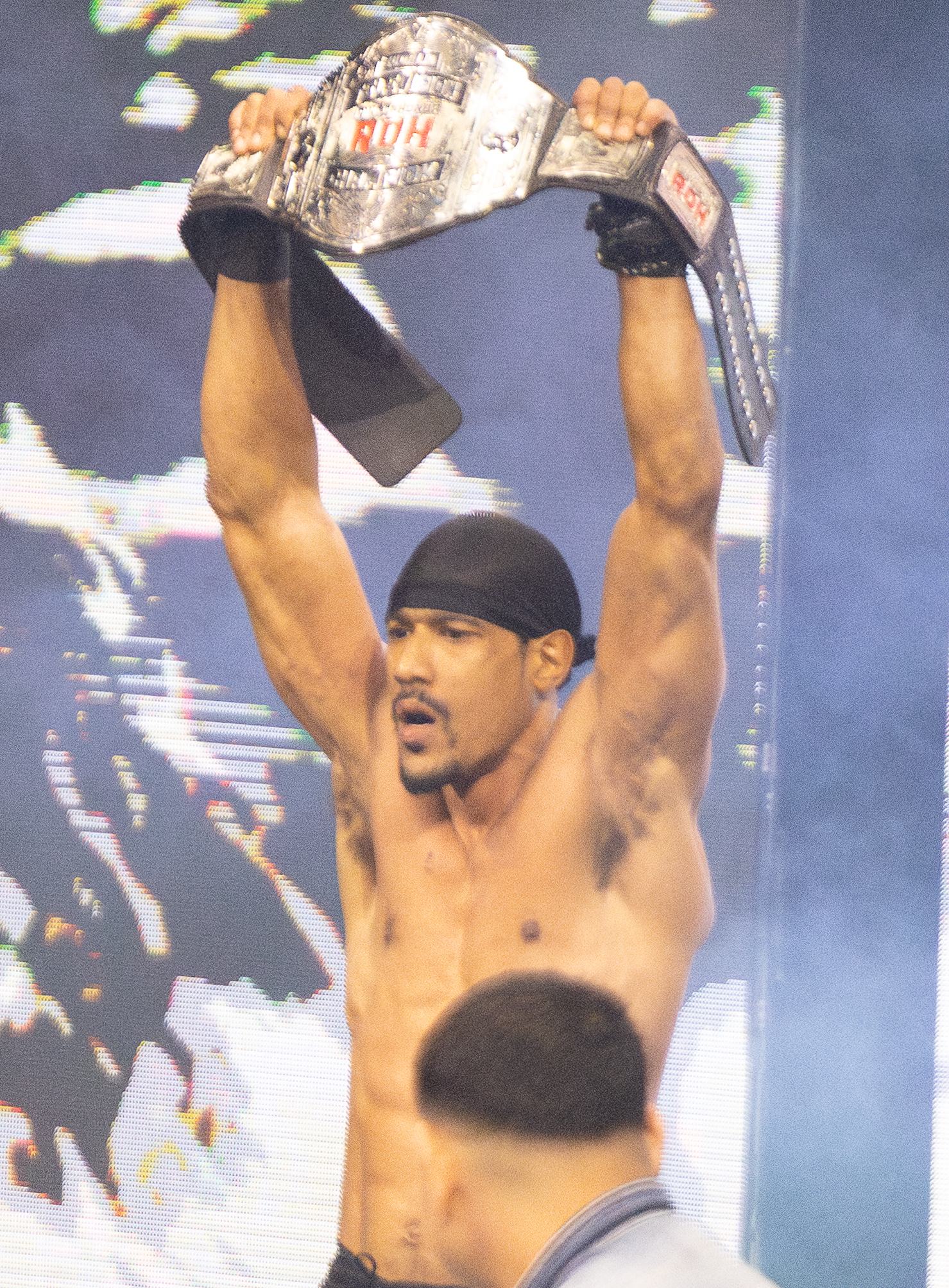
Fox is a one-time ROH World Television Champion

- AAW: Professional Wrestling Redefined
  - AAW Heritage Championship (1 time)
  - AAW Tag Team Championship (2 times) – with Myron Reed (1) and Rey Fenix (1)
- All Elite Wrestling
  - Casino Trios Royale (2022) – with Dante Martin and Darius Martin
- Chile Lucha Libre
  - CLL International All Star Championship (1 time, inaugural)
  - Torneo Sala de Campeones (2013)
- Combat Zone Wrestling
  - CZW World Junior Heavyweight Championship (1 time)
  - CZW Wired TV Championship (3 times)
  - CZW World Junior Heavyweight #1 Contendership Tournament (2011)
  - Queen and King of the Ring (2013) – with Athena
  - Best of the Best 11 People's Choice Award (2012)
- Dragon Gate USA
  - Open the United Gate Championship (1 time) – with Cima
- Dreamwave Wrestling
  - Dreamwave Alternative Championship (1 time)
- Evolve
  - Evolve Championship (1 time, inaugural)
  - Evolve Tag Team Championship (1 time) – with Leon Ruff
  - Evolve Championship Tournament (2013)
  - Style Battle Tournament (2011)
- Fight The World Wrestling
  - FTW Heavyweight Championship (1 time)
- Full Impact Pro
  - Jeff Peterson Memorial Cup (2011)
- Insanity Pro Wrestling
  - IPW Junior Heavyweight Championship (1 time)
- Legacy Wrestling
  - Legacy Heavyweight Championship (1 time)
- Lucha Underground
  - Lucha Underground Trios Championship (1 time) – with Killshot and Willie Mack
- Mucha Lucha Atlanta
  - MLA Global Championship (1 time)
- Pro Wrestling Illustrated
  - Ranked No. 94 of the top 500 singles wrestlers in the PWI 500 in 2014
- Ring of Honor
  - ROH World Television Championship (1 time)
- Rockstar Pro Wrestling
  - Tournament of Flight (2017)
- Southern Wrestling Association
  - SWA Tag Team Championship (1 time) – with Moose
  - Rhymer Cup (2015) – with Moose
- The Wrestling Revolver
  - Open Invite Scramble Championship (1 time)
- WrestleCircus
  - WC Sideshow Championship (1 time)
- World Wrestling Alliance 4
  - WW4 Heavyweight Championship (2 times)
  - WW4 Internet Championship (1 time)
- Other accomplishments
  - Wrestling World Championships Cruiserweight Tournament (2016)
