= Tony Nese =

American professional wrestler (born 1985)

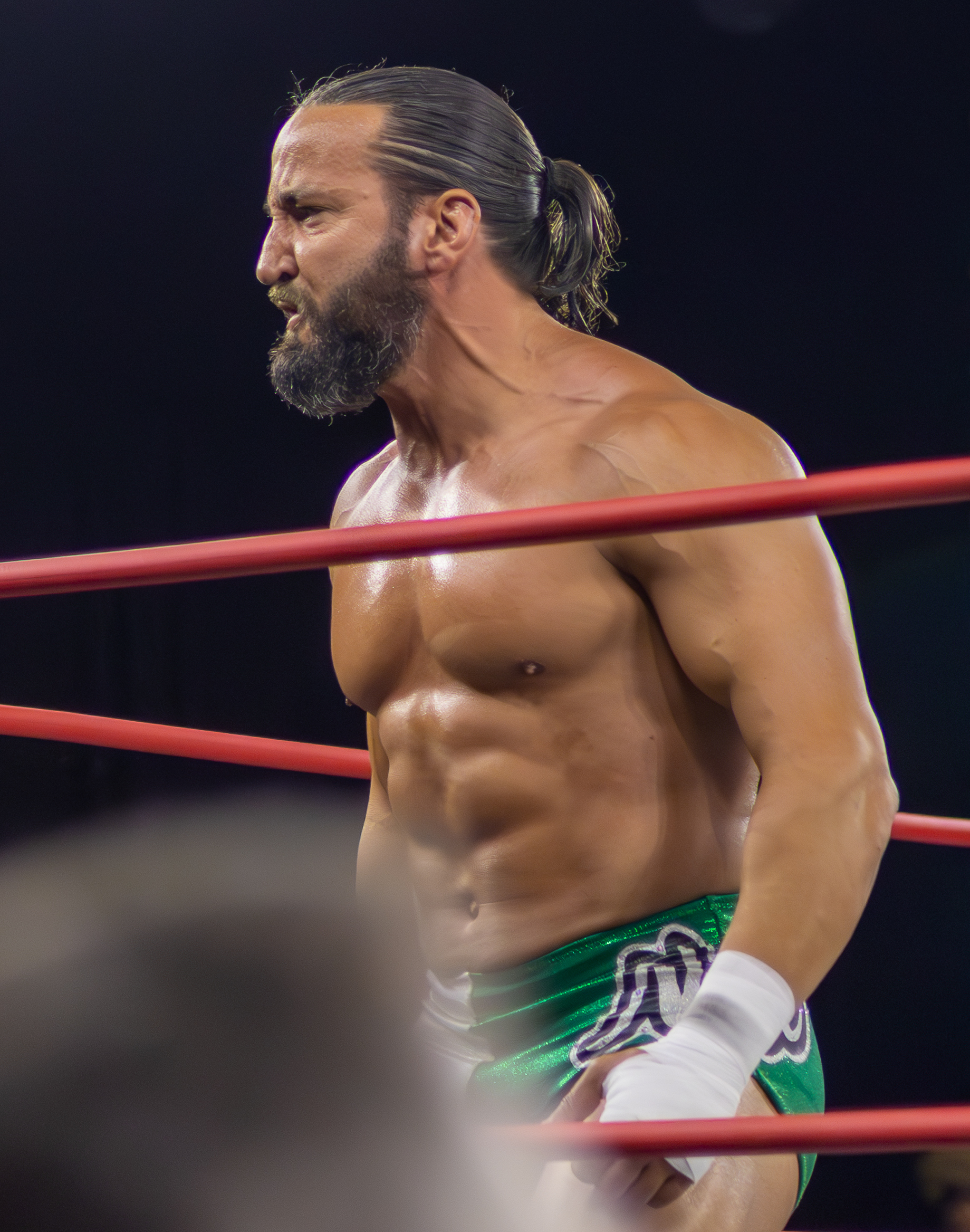
- Nese in 2025

Personal information
- Born: Anthony Nese; August 6, 1985 (age 41) Ridge, New York, U.S.
- Spouse: Liz Nese
- Children: 4

Professional wrestling career
- Ring name(s): Anthony Nese; Matt Maverick; Maverick; Tony Nese
- Billed height: 5 ft 9 in (1.75 m)
- Billed weight: 196 lb (89 kg)
- Billed from: Long Island, New York
- Trained by: Mikey Whipwreck
- Debut: September 23, 2005

Anthony Nese (born August 6, 1985) is an American professional wrestler. He has been signed to All Elite Wrestling (AEW) since December 2021, where he performs under his real name (stylized as Tony Nese), and also works as a coach. He also makes appearances for AEW's sister promotion Ring of Honor (ROH), where he is a member of The Premier Athletes stable.

He is best known for his time in WWE from 2016 to 2021, where he performed primarily on the now-defunct 205 Live brand, and is a former one-time WWE Cruiserweight Champion.

== Professional wrestling career ==
=== Independent circuit (2005–2011) ===
Nese made his professional wrestling debut on September 23, 2005, for the New York Wrestling Connection promotion in a #1 contender's battle royal match for the NYWC Interstate Championship, which was won by Rob Eckos. On November 11, 2005, Nese made his in-ring debut under the ring name Matt Maverick in a losing effort against Spyder. Nese won his first match on December 17, 2005, in a triple threat match defeating Spyder and Amazing Red. Nese continued to wrestle for the promotion for several years, shortening his ring name to Maverick. His independent wrestling career was jumpstarted after he competed in the 2008 ECWA Super 8 Tournament, where he won the first round around against Loca Vida but lost in the semi-finals to Aden Chambers. Nese would then later on compete in various dark matches for Ring of Honor (ROH) in 2009.

=== Total Nonstop Action Wrestling (2011–2013) ===
Nese made his debut for Total Nonstop Action (TNA) on the July 7, 2011, episode of Impact Wrestling as part of the X Division Showcase tournament. He was eliminated from the tournament after losing to Jack Evans in a three-way match that included Jesse Sorensen On August 18, TNA announced that Nese had signed a contract with the promotion. On that evening's episode of Impact Wrestling, he took part in a gauntlet match to determine the #1 contender to the X-Division Championship which he would be eliminated early in the match. Nese did not appear on television for a while after this. He made his return on the December 15 episode of Impact Wrestling, where he would compete in a Best of Three Series with Zema Ion to determine the third and final challenger for the X Division Championship at Genesis. Nese would lose the first match of the series.

On the December 22 edition of Impact Wrestling, Nese defeated Ion in the second round of the series. Two weeks later, Nese lost to Ion in a Contract on a Pole match in the final round of the series. Nese appeared on the March 22, 2012, episode of Impact Wrestling, competing in fatal-four-way match that included Austin Aries, Kid Kash, and Zema Ion which ended in a no contest. This would also mark Nese's final appearance in company. Nese was released from TNA on May 17, 2012, after asking permission to work a scheduled tag team match for Pro Wrestling Syndicate, which would include Nese teaming with Sami Callihan against The Great Muta and Kai. Nese was offered his release from TNA which he accepted.

Nese returned for one night only for the company's One Night Only pay-per-view show, X-Travaganza on January 12 the following year competing in a tag team match in a losing effort.

=== Return to independent circuit (2012–2016) ===
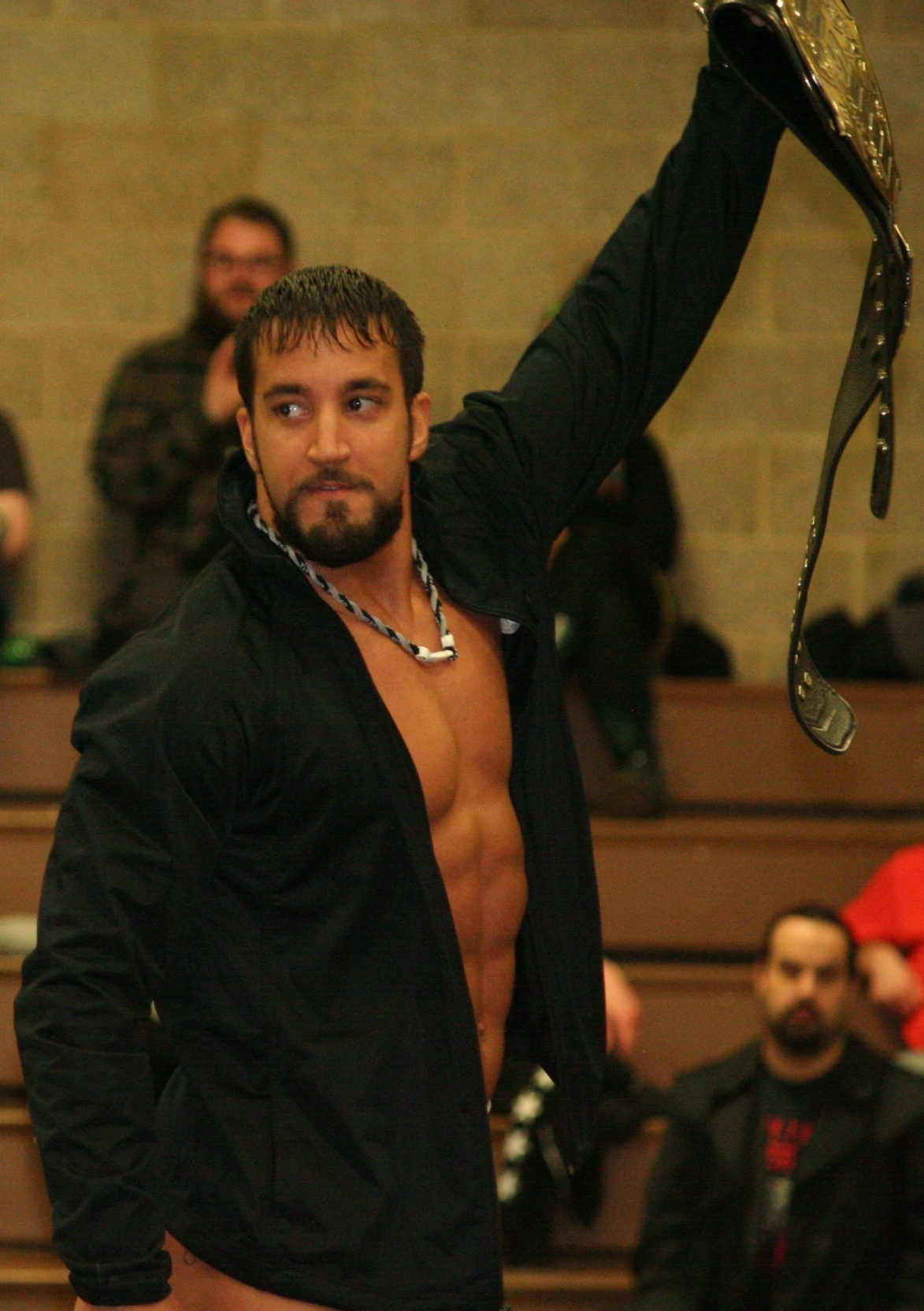
Nese at an independent circuit event in 2013

After departing from TNA, Nese returned to the independent wrestling circuit continuing to appear for the New York Wrestling Connection promotion also competing in several independent wrestling promotions including Pro Wrestling Syndicate. He started using his real name, Anthony Nese as his ring name. Nese became the first PWS Tri-State champion and was undefeated. He shortly feuded with Matt Hardy, defeating him in a match for the Tri-State title before eventually losing the title to Star Man on November 9, 2012, in a triple threat match. On October 12, 2013, Nese defeated the FWE Tri Borough Champion Paul London in a non-title match. In early 2013, Nese began working for Dragon Gate USA and Evolve. On November 3, Nese began his first tour of Dragon Gate USA's Japanese parent promotion, Dragon Gate, unsuccessfully challenging Genki Horiguchi H.A.Gee.Mee!! for the Open the Brave Gate Championship. On November 9, 2013, at House of Hardcore 3, Nese defeated Alex Reynolds and Petey Williams. On December 8, 2013, Nese won the Family Wrestling Entertainment's Openweight Grand Prix.

On September 14, 2014, at Evolve 35, Nese and Caleb Konley won the Open the United Gate Championship from The Bravado Brothers (Harlem and Lancelot) in a three-way match, also involving A. R. Fox and Rich Swann. At FWE ReFueled day 1, Nese and Jigsaw defeated Adrenaline Express to win the FWE Tag Team Championship. The following day, they lost the title to The Young Bucks.

=== WWE (2016–2021) ===
==== 205 Live debut (2016–2018) ====
On June 11, 2016, at Evolve 63, Nese defeated Lince Dorado, Drew Gulak, Johnny Gargano and T. J. Perkins to qualify for WWE's Cruiserweight Classic tournament. The tournament began on June 23, with Nese defeating Anthony Bennett in his first round match. On July 14, Nese was eliminated from the tournament by Brian Kendrick.

On the September 26 episode of Raw, Nese made his main roster debut, losing to Cruiserweight Champion T.J. Perkins. On the October 3 episode of Raw, Nese won his first match on the main roster against Rich Swann. Nese made his pay-per-view debut on the Hell in a Cell pre-show, teaming with Drew Gulak and Ariya Daivari in a losing effort to Cedric Alexander, Lince Dorado and Sin Cara. On the Survivor Series pre-show, Nese, Drew Gulak and Ariya Daivari lost to T.J. Perkins, Rich Swann, and Noam Dar. In early 2017, Nese would later wrestle on 205 Live and Main Event, trading wins and losses over Gran Metalik, Lince Dorado and Mustafa Ali. Nese began aligning with Enzo Amore's faction which consisting of Ariya Daivari, Drew Gulak and Noam Dar, they dubbed themselves as "The Zo Train". On the December 12 episode of 205 Live, Nese was attacked by The Zo Train. Nese returned two weeks later, unsure of his position as a member of the Zo Train, and defeated Akira Tozawa. Amore was fired from WWE in January 2018, thus quietly disbanding The Zo Train.

On the February 13 episode of 205 Live, Nese was entered into a Cruiserweight Championship tournament to determine a new Cruiserweight Champion, where he was defeated by Drew Gulak in a first round. On the March 27 episode of 205 Live, Nese was defeated by Mark Andrews. On the April 10 episode of 205 Live, Nese saved Andrews from an attack of Drew Gulak, turning face in the process. On April 27, Nese participated in the Greatest Royal Rumble, entering at number 10, eliminating Hornswoggle, before being eliminated by Kofi Kingston and Xavier Woods.

==== Cruiserweight Champion (2018–2019) ====
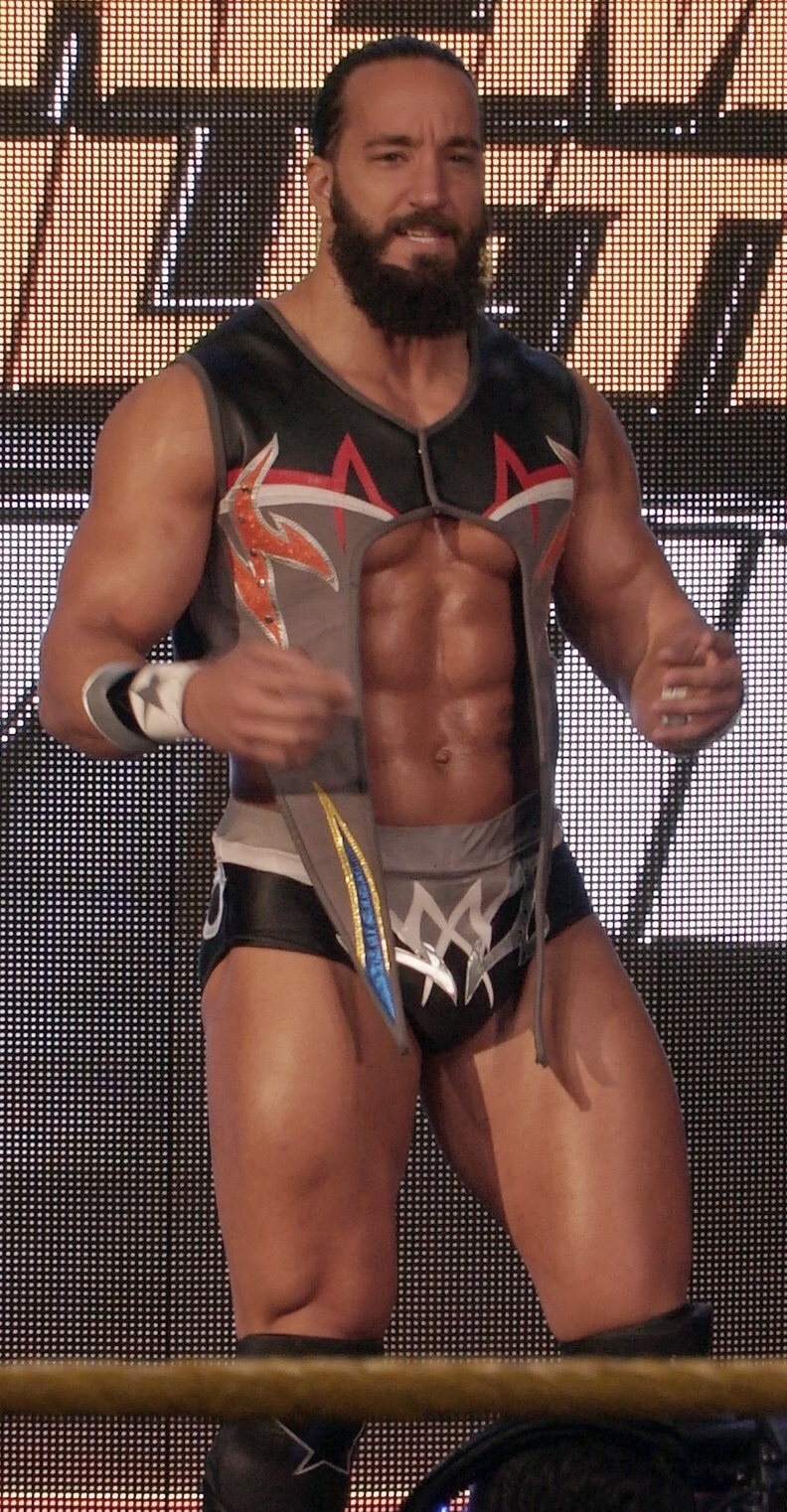
Nese in 2018

Some weeks later, he aligned himself with Buddy Murphy, turning heel once again. They went on to feud with Lucha House Party (Kalisto, Gran Metalik and Lince Dorado), with the two sides trading victories. On the October 10 episode of 205 Live, Nese defeated Cedric Alexander, who had recently lost the Cruiserweight Championship to Murphy. On the October 17 episode of 205 Live, Nese won a fatal five-way match including Alexander, Gran Metalik, TJP and Lio Rush after pinning Alexander. On the October 31 episode of 205 Live, Nese lost to Mustafa Ali in a number one contender's match for the Cruiserweight Championship. Nese then began feuding with Noam Dar as the two traded victories over each other. On the January 29, 2019, episode of 205 Live, he was suspended indefinitely for attacking Dar in the parking lot. Nese returned on the February 12 episode of 205 Live, defeating Dar in a well-received No Disqualification match, ending their feud.

Prior to WrestleMania 35, a tournament to determine the number one contender for the Cruiserweight Championship was arranged, in which Nese defeated Kalisto in the first round, Drew Gulak in the semifinals, and Cedric Alexander in the finals to become the number one contender for the Cruiserweight Championship against his ally Buddy Murphy. After the match, he was attacked by Murphy, turning face in the process. On April 7, during the pre-show of WrestleMania 35, Nese defeated Murphy to win the Cruiserweight Championship for the first time. Two days later, on the April 9 episode of 205 Live, Nese defeated Murphy in a rematch to retain his championship. At Money in the Bank, Nese defeated Ariya Daivari to retain the Cruiserweight Championship. On June 23 at the Stomping Grounds, Nese lost the title to Drew Gulak in a triple threat match which also involved Akira Tozawa, ending his reign at 77 days. He would go on to lose a subsequent rematch against Gulak at Extreme Rules.

==== Various feuds (2019–2021) ====
On the September 3 episode of 205 Live, after losing to Mike Kanellis, Nese attacked Oney Lorcan backstage, turning heel. On that same night, Nese joined forces with Drew Gulak to attack Humberto Carrillo and Lince Dorado. On the September 17 episode of 205 Live, Nese defeated Lorcan with assistance from Gulak. Nese continued teaming with Gulak before he was drafted to SmackDown Live in October. Following this, Nese would find himself feuding with members of the NXT roster who began appearing on 205 Live such as Oney Lorcan and Tyler Breeze which culminated in a 5-on-5 match pitting himself, Brian Kendrick, Jack Gallagher, Ariya Daivari and Mike Kanellis representing Team 205 against Oney Lorcan, Danny Burch, Isaiah "Swerve" Scott, Tyler Breeze and Kushida representing Team NXT where they were defeated.

In April 2020, Nese was announced as a participant in the Interim Cruiserweight Title tournament representing Group A in the tournament. Nese was defeated by Kushida, Drake Maverick and Jake Atlas failing to score a single win in the tournament. Nese would then begin feuding with Scott who made fun of him for not scoring a single win in the tournament which led to them facing off on the June 3 episode of NXT and again on the June 26 episode of 205 Live where Nese lost. On the July 3 episode of 205 Live, Nese assisted Scott in defeating Ever-Rise in a tag team match and shook hands with him after. In late 2020, Nese aligned himself with Ariya Daivari and referred to themselves as the "205 Live OGs", and throughout the first half of 2021 would feud with newcomers such as August Grey, Curt Stallion, and Ikemen Jiro. On June 25, 2021, Nese was released from his WWE contract.

=== All Elite Wrestling / Ring of Honor (2021–present) ===
On the October 23 episode of AEW Dynamite, Nese was shown seated in the crowd during the show with commentators hyping him as "one of the hottest free agents in pro wrestling". Nese made his AEW debut on the November 3rd episode of AEW Dark in a winning effort against Fuego Del Sol. On December 3, it was announced that Nese had officially signed with AEW. That same night, he unsuccessfully challenged Sammy Guevara for the AEW TNT Championship on AEW Rampage. In the summer of 2022, Nese formed a tag team with Josh Woods, and the duo would acquire the services of Mark Sterling as their manager and on-screen attorney. On the August 5 edition of Rampage, Nese & Woods unsuccessfully challenged Swerve in our Glory (Keith Lee & Swerve Strickland) for the AEW World Tag Team Championship. On the October 7 edition of Rampage, Nese & Woods defeated The Varsity Blonds (Brian Pillman Jr. & Griff Garrison), and after the match, Sterling revealed he had "trademarked" the term Varsity as it relates to professional wrestling, and that Woods & Nese would be known as The Varsity Athletes going forward.

In August 2025, it was reported that Nese had been working in a backstage role in AEW as a coach.

== Other media ==
Nese is a playable character in the video games WWE 2K19 and WWE 2K20.

== Personal life ==
Nese is married to a woman named Liz, and they have four children: a girl, a boy and two twin sons. His first son Eric was born on November 21, 2019. His twin sons Bryce and Benjamin were born on October 22, 2024.

== Championships and accomplishments ==
- Dragon Gate USA
  - Open the United Gate Championship (1 time) – with Caleb Konley and Trent Baretta^{1}
  - Six-Man Tag Team Tournament (2014) – with Caleb Konley and Trent Baretta
- Family Wrestling Entertainment
  - FWE Tag Team Championship (1 time) – with Jigsaw
  - Openweight Grand Prix (2013)
- International Wrestling Cartel
  - IWC Super Indy Championship (1 time)
- Five Borough Wrestling
  - FBW Heavyweight Championship (1 time)
- New York Wrestling Connection
  - NYWC Heavyweight Championship (2 times)
  - NYWC Tag Team Championship (1 time) – with Plazma
  - NYWC Interstate Championship (1 time)
  - NYWC Fusion Championship (1 time)
  - NYWC Six Man Tag Team Tournament (2009) – with Bruno Marciano and Joey Braggiol
  - March Madness Sweet 16 Battle Royal (2011) – with Pat Buck and Stockade
  - Masters of the Mat (2012, 2015)
  - Joker's Wild Battle Royal (2015)
  - NYWC Hall of Fame (2022)
- Pro Wrestling Illustrated
  - Ranked No. 45 of the top 500 singles wrestlers in the PWI 500 in 2019
- Pro Wrestling Syndicate
  - PWS Tri-State Championship (1 time)
- WWE
  - WWE Cruiserweight Championship (1 time)
  - WWE Cruiserweight Championship Tournament (2019)
