= Ariya Daivari =

American professional wrestler (born 1989)

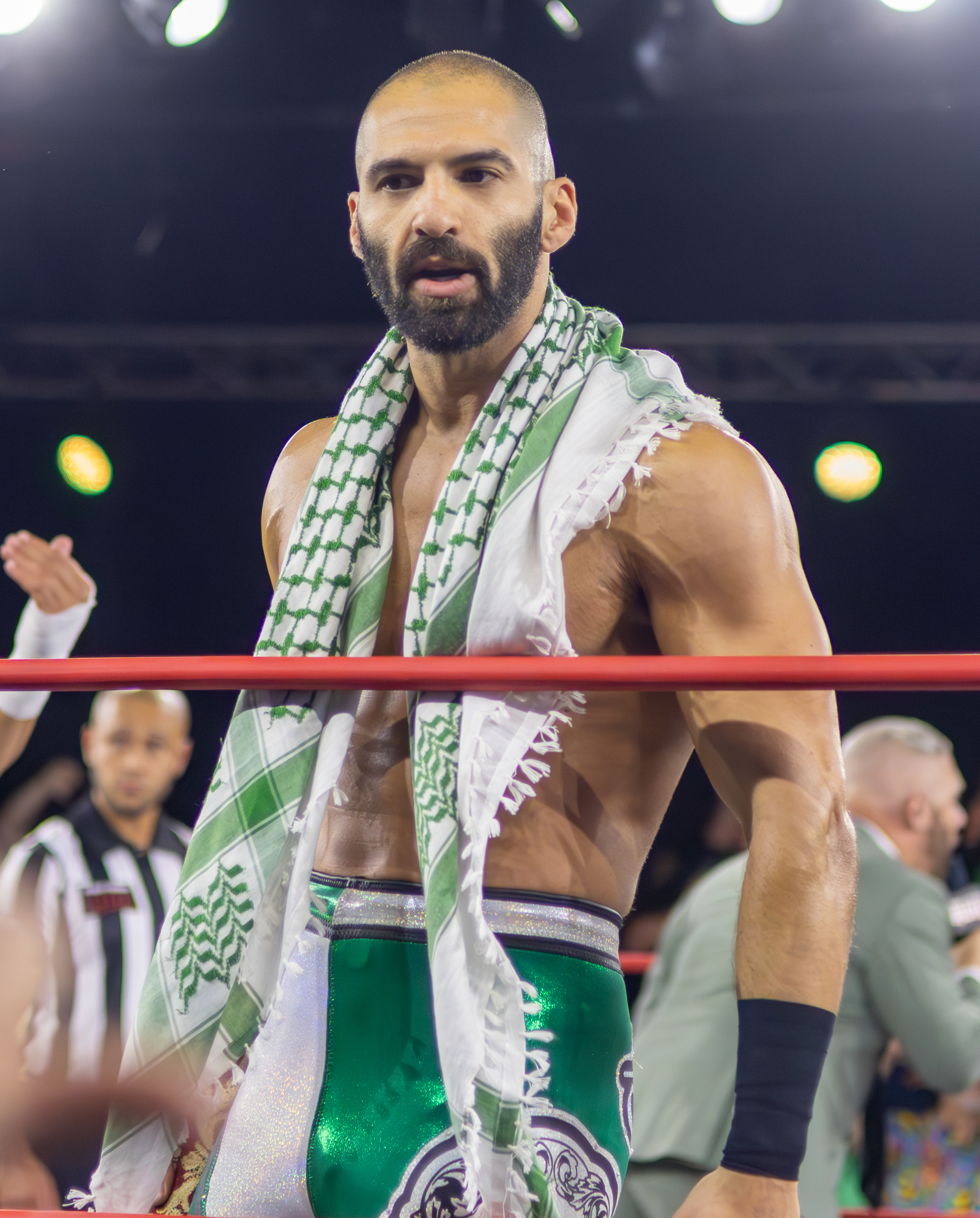
- Daivari in August 2025

Personal information
- Born: Ariya Daivari; April 11, 1989 (age 37) Plymouth, Minnesota, U.S.
- Family: Shawn Daivari (brother)

Professional wrestling career
- Ring name(s): Ari Daivari; Ariya Daivari; Arya Daivari; Sheik Ariya Daivari; Sheik Mustafa Bashir
- Billed height: 5 ft 10 in (178 cm)
- Billed weight: 189 lb (86 kg)
- Billed from: Minneapolis, Minnesota by way of Tehran, Iran; Tehran, Iran
- Trained by: Arik Cannon; Ken Anderson; Shawn Daivari; Shelton Benjamin
- Debut: September 26, 2006

Ariya Daivari (Persian: آریا داوری; born April 11, 1989) is an American professional wrestler. He is signed to All Elite Wrestling (AEW), and is a member of The Premier Athletes stable. He also works as a coach for the promotion. He also performs for its sister promotion Ring of Honor (ROH). Daivari is best known for his time in WWE, where he performed in the now-defunct Cruiserweight Division. He is previous appearances on the New Japan Pro-Wrestling (NJPW) and the National Wrestling Alliance (NWA).

== Professional wrestling career ==
=== Independent circuit (2006–2017) ===
After building a background in Taekwondo and amateur wrestling during his high school years, Ariya was trained in professional wrestling by his brother Shawn Daivari and fellow wrestler Arik Cannon. He also trained with Shelton Benjamin and former WWE wrestler Ken Anderson. Ariya debuted in a Midwest Pro Wrestling Academy event on September 26, 2006, at the First Avenue nightclub. Before his 2016 WWE debut, Ariya performed for various U.S. wrestling promotions, including Ring of Honor, Global Force Wrestling, and Impact Wrestling's India project, Ring Ka King.

=== WWE (2016–2021, 2022) ===
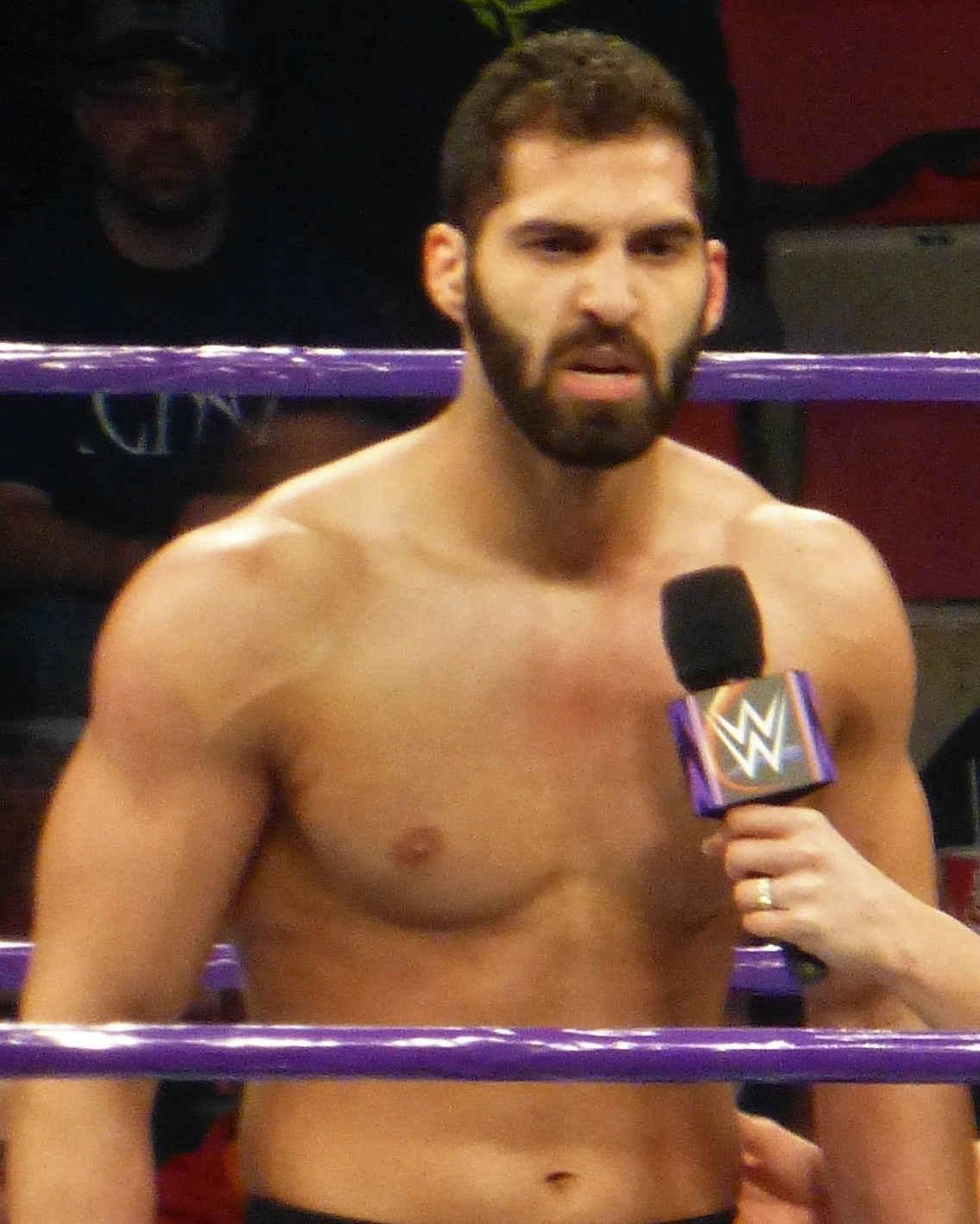
Daivari in 2016

==== Cruiserweight division (2016–2021) ====
Daivari's first experience with WWE was wrestling in a non-televised match for WWE SmackDown at the Target Center in 2013. The following year he participated in a tryout at the WWE Performance Center. On June 13, 2016, Daivari was announced as a competitor in the WWE Cruiserweight Classic. On June 23, 2016, Daivari was eliminated from the tournament in his first round match by Ho Ho Lun. On the October 10, 2016 episode of Raw, Daivari made his main roster debut as part of the cruiserweight division on Raw as a heel, losing by submission to the Cruiserweight Champion T. J. Perkins. On the Hell in a Cell pre-show, Daivari teamed with Tony Nese and Drew Gulak in a losing effort to Cedric Alexander, Lince Dorado and Sin Cara. On the Survivor Series pre-show, Daivari, Nese and Gulak were defeated by TJ Perkins, Rich Swann and Noam Dar. He then started a feud with Gentleman Jack Gallagher, which ended in an "I forfeit" match, which he lost.

Daivari began his championship pursuits for the Cruiserweight Championship in July 2017. Akira Tozawa called Daivari out on the July 24 episode of Raw for a rematch after Titus O'Neil forfeited their singles match the week prior on Tozawa's behalf. While Neville showed up to confront Tozawa, Daivari then appeared to attack both Tozawa and Neville. He faced off against Neville the next night on 205 Live, winning via count-out. When Enzo Amore became the Cruiserweight Champion, Daivari appeared to support Amore on 205 Live and became a member of Amore's heel faction "The Zo Train", along with Tony Nese, Drew Gulak, and Noam Dar. On January 23, 2018, Enzo Amore was fired from WWE after allegations of sexual assault were made public, thus forcing Amore to vacate the Cruiserweight Championship and quietly disbanding "The Zo Train". Following this, Daivari participated in a tournament to crown a new Cruiserweight Champion but lost in the first round to the debuting Buddy Murphy on the February 6, 2018 episode of 205 Live.

In WWE Greatest Royal Rumble, Ariya teamed up with his brother Shawn Daivari and insulted four Saudi Arabian prospects before being driven out by Mansoor. After an extended break from action to recover from an unspecified injury, Daivari returned on the November 28 episode of 205 Live, joining Hideo Itami in an attack on a local competitor. After that, he began accompanying Itami to the ring for his matches and interfering on his behalf. On January 29 episode of 205 Live Daivari turned on Itami after the latter lost to Akira Tozawa, the same day that Itami requested his release from WWE. On the March 23 episode of 205 Live, Daivari defeated Cedric Alexander, following a distraction from Oney Lorcan. On the April 23 episode of 205 Live, Daivari defeated Lorcan to become the number one contender for the Cruiserweight Championship. However at Money in the Bank, he failed to capture the title from Tony Nese. Shortly after he would feud with Oney Lorcan which lead to an Anything Goes match where he was defeated to end their feud.

In October 2019 he would begin a feud with Isaiah "Swerve" Scott but never defeated him. Around this time he would start wearing white pants and a Gucci belt to the ring. In 2020 he took a long hiatus from the ring and returned in August 2020 upset that new cruiserweights were not respecting him. He would then form an alliance with Tony Nese calling themselves the "205 Live OG's" and throughout the first few months of 2021, they would mostly be defeated by the likes of newcomers Curt Stallion and August Grey. On June 25, 2021, Daivari was released from his WWE contract.

==== Producer (2022) ====
In April 2022, Daivari was rehired by WWE as a producer.

=== New Japan Pro Wrestling (2021–2022) ===
On September 28, 2021, it was announced that Daivari would be debuting for New Japan Pro Wrestling for their New Japan Showdown shows facing Alex Zayne on Night 1 and teaming with Lio Rush against El Phantasmo and Chris Bey on Night 2. He would make his return on June 18, 2022, at NJPW Strong, scoring a victory over Delirious.

=== All Elite Wrestling (2021–present) ===
On November 12, 2021, Daivari made his All Elite Wrestling debut on AEW Rampage losing to Dante Martin. On the June 28, 2022 episode of AEW Dark, he would make his return for the brand, defeating Caleb Konley. Daivari also serves as a coach for AEW.

=== National Wrestling Alliance (2022) ===
On April 16, 2022, Daivari made his debut for the National Wrestling Alliance, facing Nick Aldis in a losing effort.

== Personal life ==
Daivari attended Wayzata High School in Plymouth, Minnesota. He is Iranian-American and sometimes incorporates spoken Persian in his performances. His brother, Dara, is also a professional wrestler, mostly known for his time in WWE under the names Khosrow Daivari and Daivari (shortened from his previous in ring name).

== Other media ==
Ariya Daivari made his video game debut as a playable character in WWE 2K19. He also appeared in WWE 2K20 and WWE 2K22.

== Championships and accomplishments ==
- American Wrestling Association
  - AWA Rush YouTube Championship (1 time)
- American Wrestling Federation
  - AWF Elite Championship (1 time)
  - AWF Heavyweight Championship (2 times)
- Born Championship Wrestling
  - BCW Tag Team Championships (1 time) – with Judd Jennrich
- F1RST Wrestling
  - F1RST Wrestlepalooza Championship (2 times)
- French Lake Wrestling Association
  - FLWA VFW Championship (1 time)
- Heavy on Wrestling
  - HOW Undisputed Championship (1 time)
- Insane Championship Wrestling (Milwaukee)
  - ICW Tag Team Championship (1 time) – with Shawn Daivari
- Mid American Wrestling
  - MAW Junior Heavyweight Championship (1 time)
- National Wrestling Alliance Midwest
  - NWA Midwest X-Division Championship (1 time)
- National Wrestling Alliance Wisconsin
  - NWA Wisconsin Tag Team Championship (1 time) – with Dysfunction
- Prime Time Wrestling
  - PTW Heavyweight Championship (2 times)
- Pro Wrestling Illustrated
  - PWI ranked him No. 201 of the top 500 singles wrestlers in the PWI 500 in 2017
