= Masato Yoshino =

Japanese professional wrestler (born 1980)

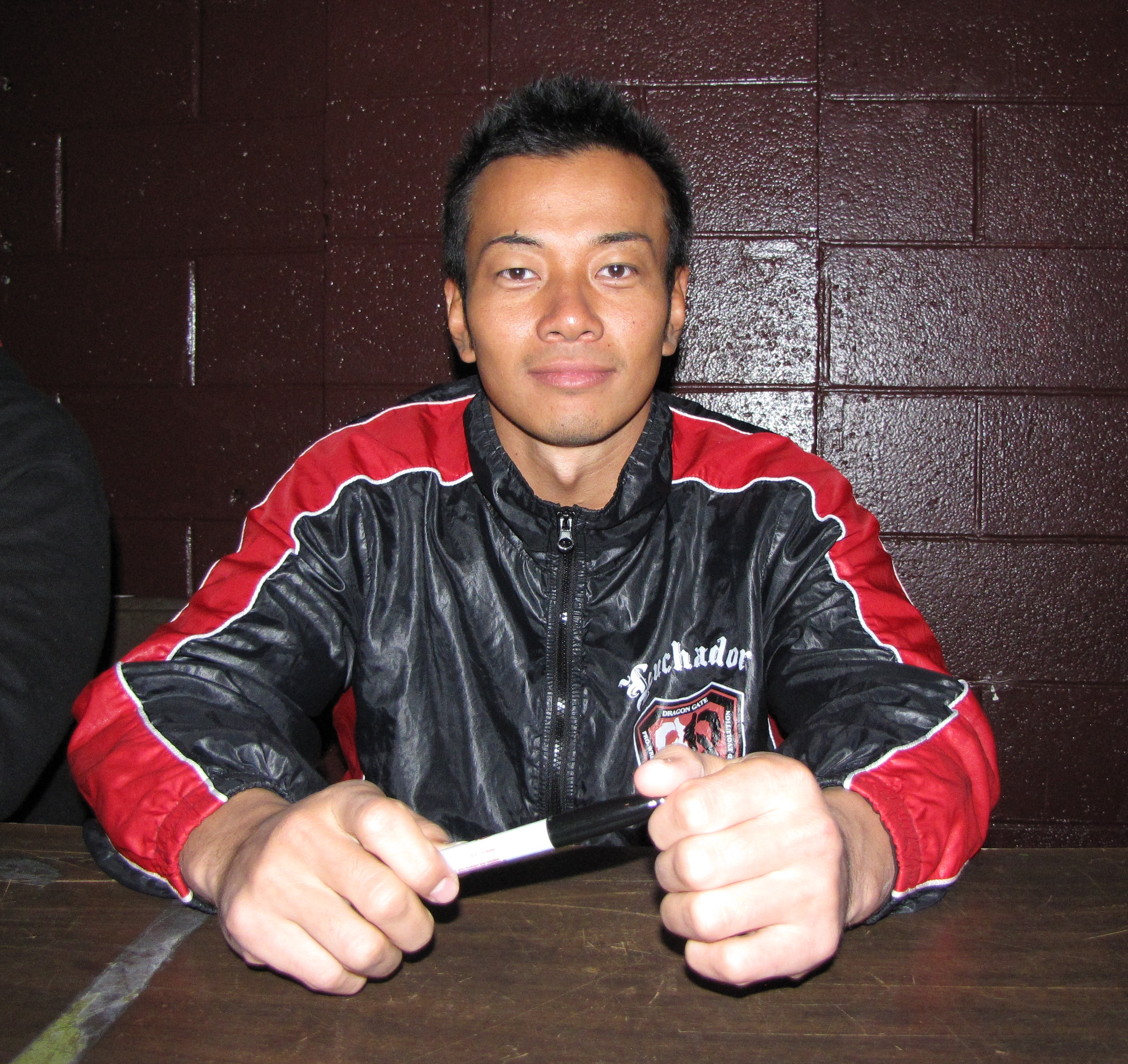
- Yoshino in 2009

Personal information
- Born: July 17, 1980 (age 46) Higashiōsaka, Osaka, Japan

Professional wrestling career
- Ring name(s): Masato Yoshino; Yoshino; Yossino; Speed Star; Sexy Tarzan
- Billed height: 1.73 m (5 ft 8 in)
- Billed weight: 74 kg (163 lb)
- Trained by: Último Dragón; Jorge "Skayde" Rivera
- Debut: September 2, 2000
- Retired: August 1, 2021

Masato Yoshino (吉野正人, Yoshino Masato; born July 17, 1980) is a retired Japanese professional wrestler, best known for working in Dragon Gate, where he was known as Speed Star. Dragon Gate's second Grand Slam champion, having been a record six-time Open the Brave Gate Champion, four-time Open the Dream Gate Champion and two-time King of Gate winner, Yoshino was one of the most decorated and longest-tenured wrestlers in Dragon Gate. He made his debut in 2000 as part of Toryumon's Toryumon 2000 Project, where he graduated as part of the 7th term.

In his nearly 21-year professional wrestling career, he notably also wrestled for Ring of Honor, Pro Wrestling NOAH and Dragon Gate USA (Dragon Gate's United States expansion). He also was influential on many professional wrestlers, both in Japan and the rest of the world due to his high-flying technique and advanced move-set. He retired on August 1, 2021, where he and Naruki Doi were defeated by Eita and long-time rival BxB Hulk.

== Career ==
=== Toryumon ===
Masato Yoshino was part of the T2P class, tied with Stevie "brother" Tsujimoto for the second highest rank of the students, although far behind top ranked Milano Collection A.T. He was noted early on for his incredible speed in the ring, earning him the nickname Speed Star. He patterned his look after Tarzan in a homage to Mexican wrestler Tarzan Boy, which involved tights fringed in a pattern to imitate a grass skirt, and the names of several of his moves centered around a jungle theme. He was nicknamed Sexy Tarzan at times by female fans, due to his outfit and muscular physique. He also adopted a "pet gorilla" (actually midget wrestler Tzuki in a monkey suit) named Venezia.

Yoshino and Tsujimoto joined Milano Collection A.T.'s Italian Connection stable when it was formed on March 3, 2002, and renamed to YOSSINO and "brother" YASSINI, respectively. While in the Italian Connection, he would hold the UWA World Trios Championship twice, with Milano/YASSINI, and with Milano/Condotti Shuji, and would also hold the NWA World Welterweight Championship once. He would also have several highly acclaimed matches with Darkness Dragon/K-ness that would increase his standing within the federation.

The Italian Connection began splintering in 2003 when Milano and Yossino wished to take the stable in a face direction, while Shuji, YASSINI, Berlinetta Boxer and Bakery Yagi wanted to remain heel. The ItaCon split when Kondo and YASSINI attacked Venezia, then Yossino for trying to stop them, and finally Milano. Kondo and the others went on to form Aagan Iisou, and ItaCon would settle as a face stable, adding Anthony W. Mori as a third member after his former partner Takuya Sugawara joined Aagan Iisou. ItaCon would feud with Aagan Iisou into the birth of Dragon Gate in July 2004.

=== Dragon Gate ===
During the early days of Dragon Gate, Yossino continued to team with his fellow Italian Connection members. Together they would become the first Dragon Gate Open the Triangle Gate Champions. The ItaCon would dissolve in 2005 when Milano left the promotion. Alone as Mori went to create PosHearts with Magnum TOKYO, Super Shisa and the debuting BxB Hulk, Yossino prepared for the tournament to crown the first Dragon Gate Open The Brave Gate champion, which was won by Doi . He also briefly teamed with his respected rival K-Ness, but shortly afterwards backstabbed him to join the newly formed Blood Generation stable. He also did away with his Tarzan gimmick, cutting his hair short and switching from fringed tights to a singlet, and he returned to using his given name, Masato Yoshino, in the ring. On April 12, 2006, when CIMA kicked Gamma out of the group due to their constantly butting heads, Yoshino - along with Naruki Doi and Naoki Tanizaki - followed Gamma. Eleven days later, after Doi & Gamma won full rights to the Blood Generation name from CIMA & Don Fujii in a tag match, they refused the name and became the Muscle Outlaw'z.

Yoshino began to gain rank within Dragon Gate rapidly in 2007. He began teaming with stable leader Naruki Doi as Speed Muscle, and together they would win the I-J Heavyweight Tag Team Championship and the GHC Junior Heavyweight Tag Team Championship, as well as become the first Open the Twin Gate Champions and Summer Adventure Tag League Tournament winners. He also captured the Open the Brave Gate Championship twice that year.

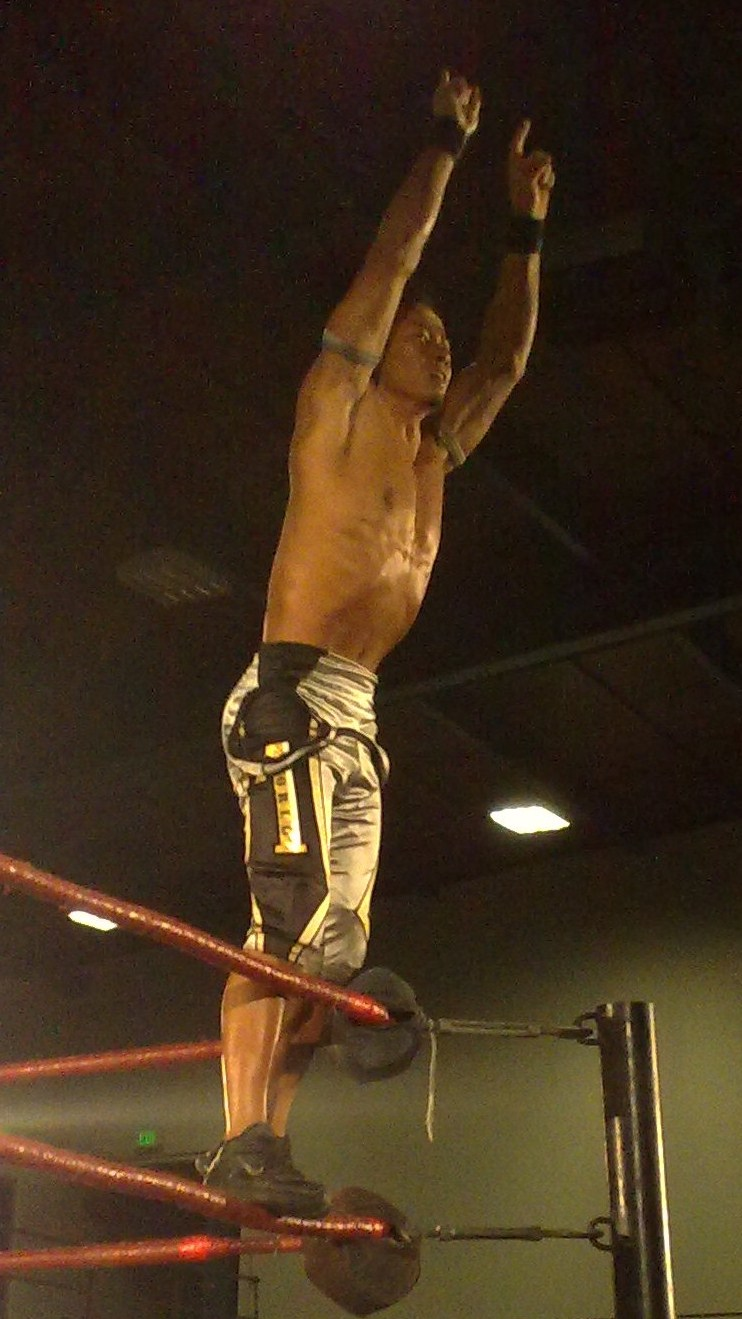
Yoshino at a Pro Wrestling Guerrilla event in 2008

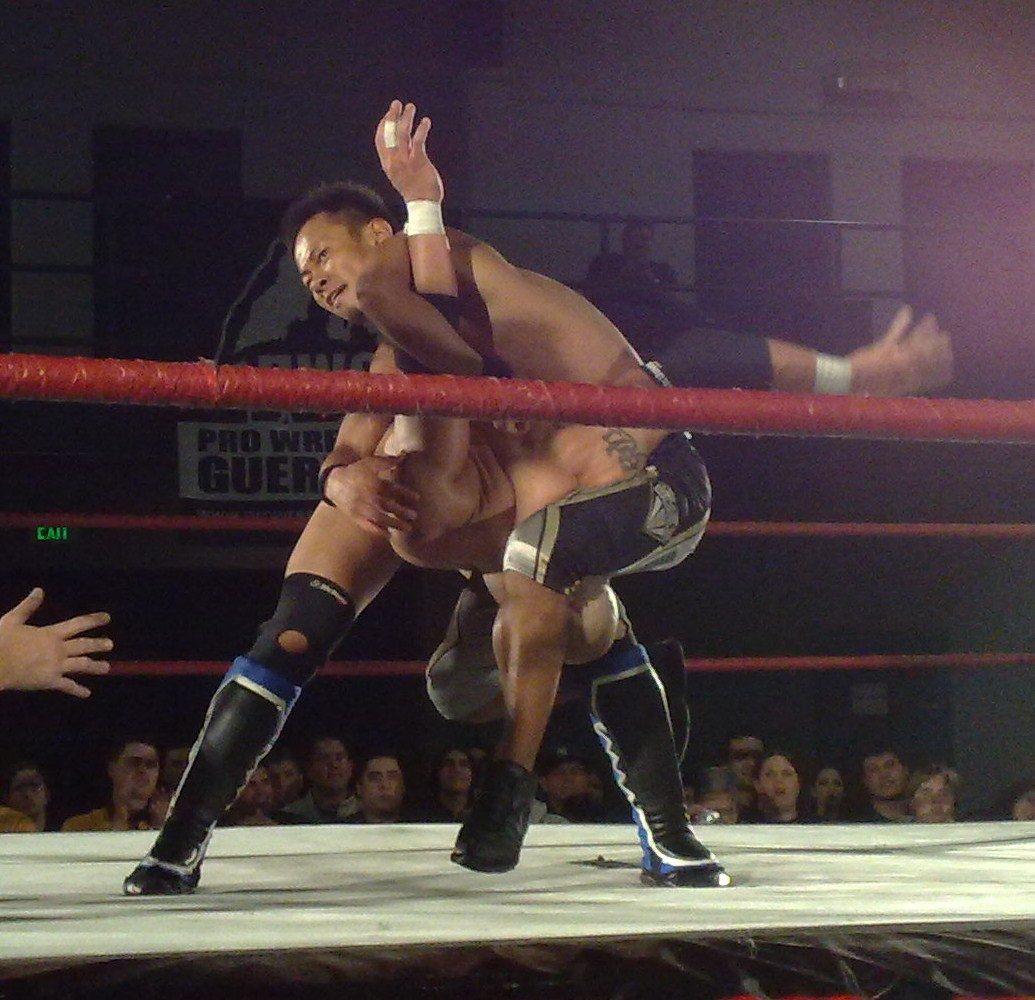
Yoshino applying the From Jungle on Low Ki.

On January 7, 2008, he made his debut in Hawaii for Action Zone Wrestling at Battleclash III, teaming with Naruki Doi in a Four-Way Elimination Tag Team match for the AZW Tag Team Championships.

During 2008, Yoshino continued to gain rank. In March, he faced CIMA for the Open the Dream Gate Title, losing in just under 30 minutes when Doi threw in the towel. His performance was praised by stablemates and rivals alike, and his team with Doi - which looked for a while like it was going to come apart - was reconciled. By this time, Doi & Yoshino were leaning towards becoming faces again, thus causing tensions to start stirring in MO'z, and the tensions grew more and more as the weeks went on. Finally, on May 5, Doi & Yoshino turned on the other members of MO'z when they attacked stablemate Yasushi Kanda and cost him his hair in a Mascara contra Cabellera (Mask vs. Hair) Cage Survival Six-Way Match. Nine days later, soon after the mega-group Real Hazard was formed, Doi and Yoshino - along with BxB Hulk, Naoki Tanisaki, and m.c.KZ - formed the group WORLD-1.

On June 29, he wrestled Gamma for the Open the Brave Gate title (which Gamma had renamed to the "Open the Gamma Gate" title) under the mask of Dr. Muscle, defeating him and restoring the Brave Gate's faceplate to the belt. He then had it vacated, only winning it to see its restoration and for a proper decision match to take place. In August, he and Doi won their second straight Summer Adventure Tag League Tournament, and then the next month, on September 26, they beat Ryo Saito and Susumu Yokosuka to become the Open the Twin Gate Champions for the second time. Though their second reign would only last nine days, for they lost the belts to YAMATO & Cyber Kong, Yoshino rebounded a week later when he captured the Open the Brave Gate Title for a fourth time, besting Genki Horiguchi. He defended it twice before losing it to CIMA on March 22 in another great match between the two.

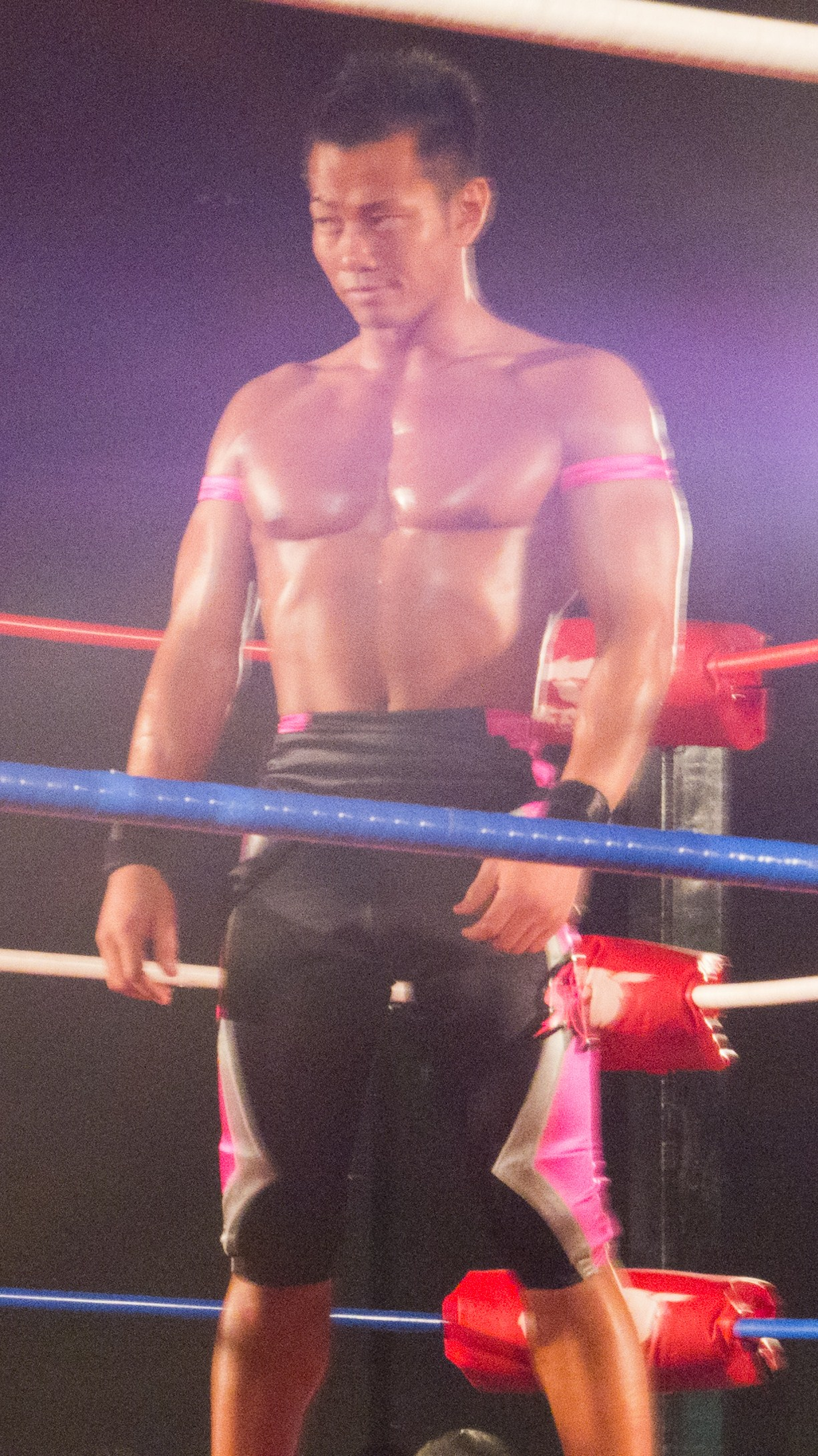
Yoshino at the Open the Ultimate Gate event in March 2012

On June 7, he, BxB Hulk and PAC captured the Triangle Gate titles from CIMA, Gamma & KAGETORA, and they held them for three months before dropping them to Masaaki Mochizuki, Don Fujii & Akebono. On July 11, 2010, Yoshino defeated YAMATO to win the Open the Dream Gate Championship for the first time. On August 14, 2010, Yoshino defeated Tigers Mask to win the Open the Brave Gate Championship for the fifth time, but immediately afterwards vacated the title, due to also holding the Open the Dream Gate Championship. On August 24, 2010, Yoshino and Naruki Doi won their third Summer Adventure Tag League by defeating Genki Horiguchi and Ryo Saito in the finals. On October 13, 2010, Doi, bitter about Yoshino winning the Open the Dream Gate Championship, turned on him and BxB Hulk and joined the former Deep Drunkers and Takuya Sugawara to form a new heel stable. On December 26, 2010, at Final Gate 2010 Yoshino successfully defended the Open the Dream Gate Championship against Doi. On January 30, 2011, Yoshino and PAC defeated Chuck Taylor and Johnny Gargano to become Dragon Gate USA's first ever Open the United Gate Champions. On April 14, 2011, Yoshino lost the Open the Dream Gate Championship to Masaaki Mochizuki. At the same event, World-1 failed to win the Open the Triangle Gate Championship from Blood Warriors and was as a result forced to disband. On April 24 former World-1 members Yoshino, BxB Hulk, PAC and Susumu Yokosuka agreed to form a new alliance with Masaaki Mochizuki to battle Blood Warriors. On June 8, the new group was named Junction Three in reference to it being a union between the former members of World-1, KAMIKAZE and the Veteran-gun. On June 18, Yoshino, Gamma and YAMATO defeated the Blood Warriors team of CIMA, Naruki Doi and BxB Hulk to win the vacant Open the Triangle Gate Championship. They would go on to lose the title to the Blood Warriors team of Kzy, Naoki Tanisaki and Naruki Doi on September 2. On September 11, Yoshino and PAC lost the Open the United Gate Championship to Open the Twin Gate Champions, CIMA and Ricochet, in a title vs. title match. On February 9, 2012, Junction Three was forced to disband, after losing a fourteen-man elimination tag team match to Blood Warriors. Yoshino then reunited with Naruki Doi to form World-1 International. On March 30, 2012, he and Ricochet defeated Ronin's Chuck Taylor and Johnny Gargano at a Dragon Gate USA event in Miami, Florida, to win the vacant Open the United Gate Championship. On May 6, Yoshino, Doi and Pac won the Open the Triangle Gate Championship. On June 21, 2012, Yoshino and Ricochet were stripped of the United Gate Championship due to Yoshino being forced to miss Dragon Gate USA's July 2012 events. On May 5, 2013, Yoshino defeated Dragon Kid to win the Open the Brave Gate Championship for the sixth time. He vacated the title on August 30 after he, Chihiro Tominaga and Ryotsu Shimizu lost to the debuting Millennials (T-Hawk, Eita and U-T), saying he felt the title should be competed for within the new generation. On September 12, Naruki Doi turned on Yoshino, signaling the end of World-1 International. Yoshino quickly formed a new stable named Monster Express with Akira Tozawa, Ricochet, Shachihoko Boy, Shingo Takagi and Uhaa Nation. On October 10, Yoshino defeated YAMATO to win the Open the Dream Gate Championship for the second time. On March 2, 2014, Yoshino dropped the Open the Dream Gate Championship to Monster Express stablemate Ricochet. On May 30, 2015, Yoshino defeated T-Hawk in the finals to win the 2015 King of Gate tournament. On June 14, Yoshino defeated BxB Hulk to win the Open the Dream Gate Championship for the third time. He lost the title to Shingo Takagi on August 16. On November 23, 2015, Yoshino defeated Mr. Nakagawa via fan decision the Open the Owarai Gate Championship. He was stripped of the title on April 3 due to failure to defend it within the previous three months. On October 12, Monster Express was forced to disband after losing a match to VerserK.

=== Wrestling Society X ===
Yoshino competed for the MTV-based wrestling promotion Wrestling Society X, where he teamed up with Genki Horiguchi to form "Team Dragon Gate". At the time they were teaming together in WSX, Yoshino and Horiguchi were in rival stables, although Horiguchi would eventually turn heel and join the Muscle Outlaw'z himself.

=== Total Nonstop Action Wrestling ===
Yoshino and Naruki Doi came to TNA in June 2008 in order to participate in that year's World X Cup, representing Team Japan as heels. They competed in various tag team matches against members of the other teams in the weeks leading up to the World X Cup, but they lost every one of them. In the World X Cup 12 Man Elimination Tag Match at TNA Victory Road, he represented Team Japan alongside Puma and Milano Collection A.T. As the last surviving member of his team, he overcame numerous obstacles to become one of the last two men in the match, before succumbing to Alex Shelley in the loss.

== Championships and accomplishments ==
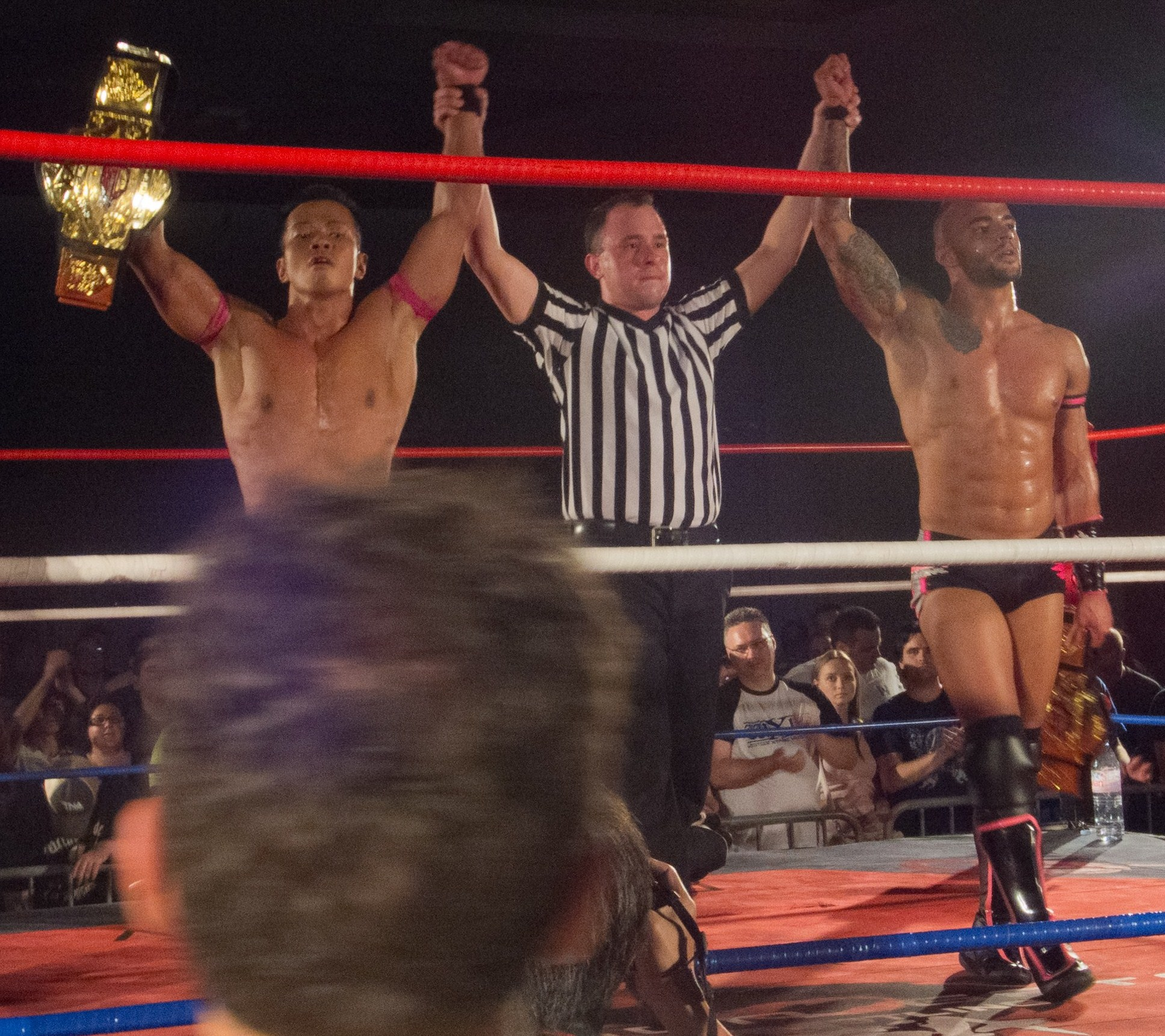
Yoshino and Ricochet after winning the Open the United Gate Championship at the Open the Ultimate Gate event in March 2012.

- Dragon Gate
  - Dragon Gate I-J Heavyweight Tag Team Championship (1 time) – with Naruki Doi
  - Open the Dream Gate Championship (4 times)
  - Open the Brave Gate Championship (6 times)
  - Open the Owarai Gate Championship (1 time)
  - Open the Triangle Gate Championship (11 times) – Milano Collection AT and Anthony W. Mori (1), CIMA and Magnitude Kishiwada (1), Naruki Doi and Gamma (2), Naruki Doi and Magnitude Kishiwada (1), BxB Hulk and PAC (1), Gamma and Yamato (1), Naruki Doi and Pac (1), and Naruki Doi and Shachihoko Boy (1), Akira Tozawa and T-Hawk (1), and Naruki Doi and Jason Lee (1)
  - Open the Twin Gate Championship (3 times) – with Naruki Doi (2) and Shachihoko Boy (1)
  - King of Gate (2015, 2018)
  - Summer Adventure Tag League (2007, 2008, 2010) – with Naruki Doi
  - Third Triple Crown Champion
  - Second Grand Slam Champion
- Dragon Gate USA
  - DGUSA Open the United Gate Championship (2 times) – with PAC (1) and Ricochet (1)
- Pro Wrestling Illustrated
  - PWI ranked him #116 of the top 500 singles wrestlers in the PWI 500 in 2012
  - Ranked No. 209 of the top 500 singles wrestlers in the PWI 500 in 2019
- Pro Wrestling Noah
  - GHC Junior Heavyweight Tag Team Championship (1 time) – with Naruki Doi
- Tokyo Sports
  - Technique Award (2013)
- Toryumon Japan
  - Differ Cup (2003) – with Ultimo Dragon
  - NWA World Welterweight Championship (1 time)
  - UWA World Trios Championship (2 times) – with Milano Collection AT and "brother" YASSINI (1) and Milano Collection AT and Condotti Shuji (1)
- Wrestling Observer Newsletter
  - Match of the Year (2006) with Naruki Doi and CIMA vs. Dragon Kid, Genki Horiguchi and Ryo Saito (ROH Supercard of Honor, March 31)

=== Lucha de Apuesta record ===
Winner (wager)	Loser (wager)	Location	Event	Date	Notes
Susumu Yokosuka (hair)	Masato Yoshino (hair)	Fukuoka, Japan	DragonGate event	December 27, 2009	(Note: Six-way steel cage match, which also included BxB Hulk, Dragon Kid, MAZADA and K-Ness.)
