= Open the United Gate Championship =

Professional wrestling tag team championship

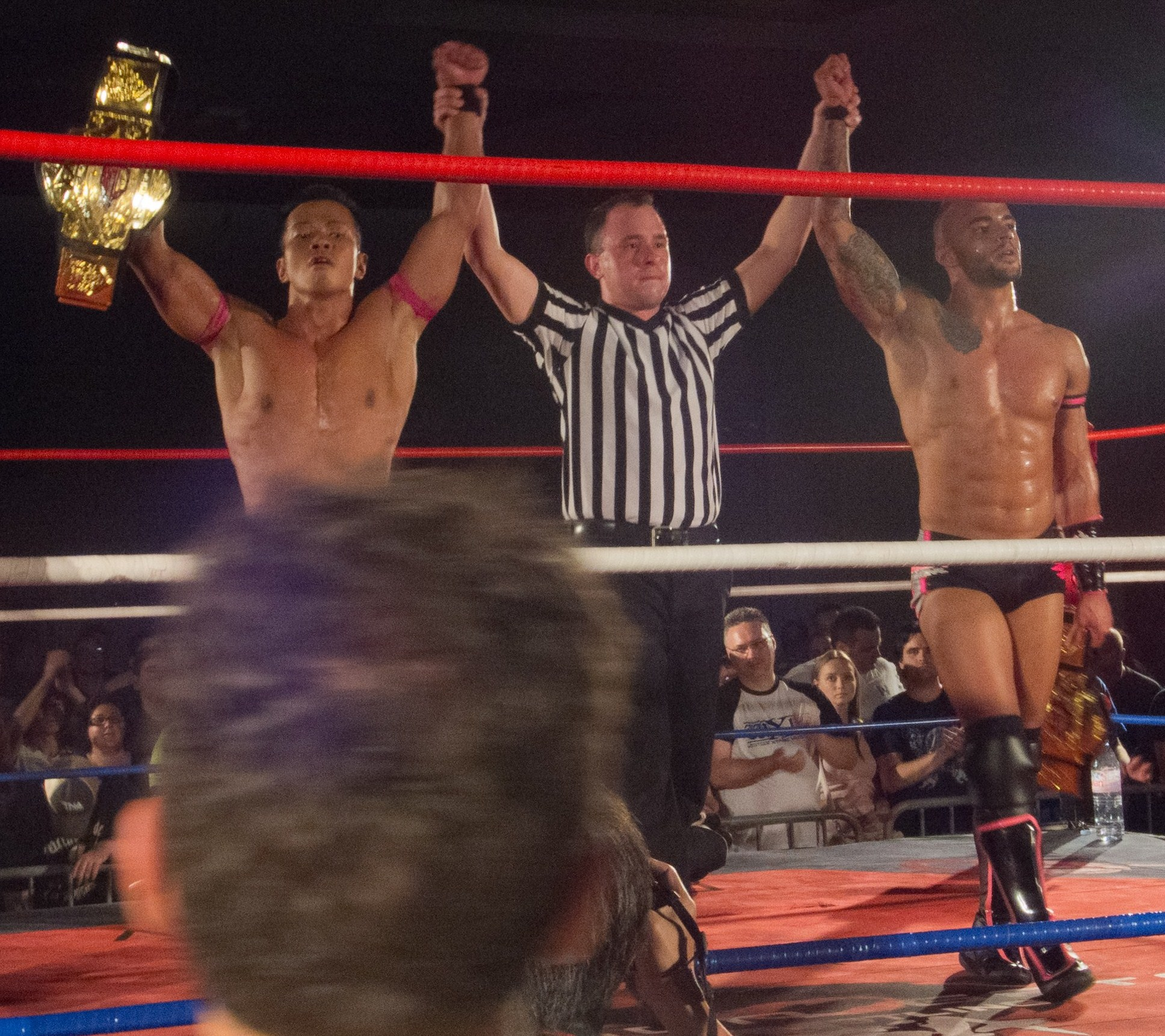
- Masato Yoshino (left) and Ricochet after winning the title in March 2012

Details
- Promotion: Dragon Gate USA; Dragon Gate; Evolve
- Date established: January 30, 2011
- Date retired: May 30, 2015
Statistics
- First champions: Masato Yoshino and Pac
- Final champions: Ronin (Johnny Gargano and Rich Swann)
- Most reigns: (as a team) All teams (1 reign): (as an individual) Cima, Masato Yoshino and Ricochet (2 reigns)
- Longest reign: The Bravado Brothers (Harlem Bravado and Lancelot Bravado) (302 days)
- Shortest reign: Ronin (42 days)
- Oldest champion: Cima, 34 years.
- Youngest champion: Ricochet, 22 years.
- Heaviest champion: The Bravado Brothers and Premiere Athlete Brand (191 kg)
- Lightest champion: Blood Warriors (156 kg)

The DGUSA Open the United Gate Championship was a tag team championship within the Dragon Gate USA promotion. The first champions were World–1 (Masato Yoshino and Pac) and were crowned at United: Finale in the tournament final, which was held in Union City, New Jersey. It aired on March 11, 2011 on pay-per-view tape delay entitled United We Stand. The title is also recognized by Dragon Gate USA's parent promotion, Dragon Gate, and it has been defended at a Dragon Gate show in Japan. The title is also recognized by the Evolve promotion. On May 30, 2015, Gargano retired the titles after a title defense.

Being a professional wrestling championship, it is not won via direct competition; it is instead won via a predetermined ending to a match or awarded to a wrestler because of a wrestling angle. Johnny Gargano and Rich Swann were the last champions, retiring the titles in their first reign both individually and as a team.

== Tournament ==
A three-day round robin tournament was held from January 28–30, 2011; which involved four teams. The four teams were World-1 members Masato Yoshino and Pac, Ronin members Johnny Gargano and Chuck Taylor, Blood Warriors members Naruki Doi and Ricochet, and Blood Warriors members Cima and Dragon Kid.

The tournament was points based with wins getting two points, a draw one point, and a loss was zero points.

Team	Wins	Losses	Draw	Points
Masato Yoshino and Pac	3	0	0	6
Johnny Gargano and Chuck Taylor	2	1	0	4
Naruki Doi and Ricochet	0	2	0	0
Cima and Dragon Kid	0	2	0	0

== Title history ==
=== Reigns ===
Key
No.	Overall reign number
Reign	Reign number for the specific team—reign numbers for the individuals are in parentheses, if different
Days	Number of days held
Defenses	Number of successful defenses

No.	Champion	Championship change			Reign statistics			Notes	Ref.
No.	Champion	Date	Event	Location	Reign	Days	Defenses	Notes	Ref.
Dragon Gate USA (DG-USA)
1	WORLD-1 / Junction Three (Masato Yoshino and PAC)	January 30, 2011	United: Finale	Union City, NJ	1	224	3	Defeated Ronin (Chuck Taylor and Johnny Gargano) in a round robin tournament. It aired on pay-per-view tape delay on March 11, 2011 under the name United We Stand	
2	Blood Warriors (Cima and Ricochet)	September 11, 2011	Way of the Ronin 2011	Milwaukee, WI	1	201	2	This match was also for the Dragon Gate Open the Twin Gate Championship	
—	Vacated	March 30, 2012	Open the Ultimate Gate 2012	Miami Beach, FL	—	—	—	The title was vacated, after Cima was sidelined with a neck injury	
3	World-1 International (Masato Yoshino (2) and Ricochet (2))	March 30, 2012	Open the Ultimate Gate 2012	Miami Beach, FL	1	83	0	Defeated Ronin (Chuck Taylor and Johnny Gargano) to win the vacant title	
—	Vacated	June 21, 2012	—	—	—	—	—	The title was vacated due to Yoshino being forced to miss Dragon Gate USA's July 2012 events	
4	A. R. Fox and Cima (2)	July 29, 2012	Enter the Dragon 2012	Chicago, IL	1	251	3	Defeated Rich Swann and Ricochet to win the vacant title	
5	The Young Bucks (Matt and Nick Jackson)	April 6, 2013	Open the Ultimate Gate 2013	Secaucus, NJ	1	224	2		
6	The Bravado Brothers (Harlem and Lancelot)	November 16, 2013	Fearless 2013	Queens, NY	1	302	7		
7	The Premier Athlete Brand (Anthony Nese, Caleb Konley and Trent Baretta)	September 14, 2014	Evolve 35	Brooklyn, NY	1	216	3	Nese and Konley defeated The Bravado Brothers in a three-way elimination match, also involving the team of A. R. Fox and Rich Swann. They defended the title with Baretta under the Freebird Rule	
8	Ronin (Johnny Gargano and Rich Swann)	April 18, 2015	Evolve 42	Orlando, FL	1	42	1	Defeated Nese and Konley	
—	Deactivated	May 30, 2015	Evolve 43	Queens, New York	—	—	—	Gargano vacated and retired the titles	

== Combined reigns ==
=== By team ===
Rank	Team	No. of reigns	Combined days
1	The Bravado Brothers (Harlem and Lancelot)	1	302
2	A. R. Fox and Cima	1	251
3	WORLD-1 / Junction Three (Masato Yoshino and PAC)	1	224
3	The Young Bucks (Matt and Nick Jackson)	1	224
5	The Premier Athlete Brand (Anthony Nese, Caleb Konley and Trent Baretta)	1	216
6	Blood Warriors (Cima and Ricochet)	1	201
7	World-1 International (Masato Yoshino and Ricochet)	1	83
8	Ronin (Johnny Gargano and Rich Swann)	1	42

=== By wrestler ===
Rank	Wrestler	No. of reigns	Combined days
1	Cima	2	452
2	Masato Yoshino	2	307
3	Harlem Bravado	1	302
3	Lancelot Bravado	1	302
5	Ricochet	2	284
6	A. R. Fox	1	251
7	Matt Jackson	1	224
7	Nick Jackson	1	224
7	Pac	1	224
10	Anthony Nese	1	216
10	Caleb Konley	1	216
10	Trent Baretta	1	216
13	Johnny Gargano	1	42
13	Rich Swann	1	42

== See also ==
- Evolve Tag Team Championship
