= Akira Tozawa =

Japanese professional wrestler (born 1985)

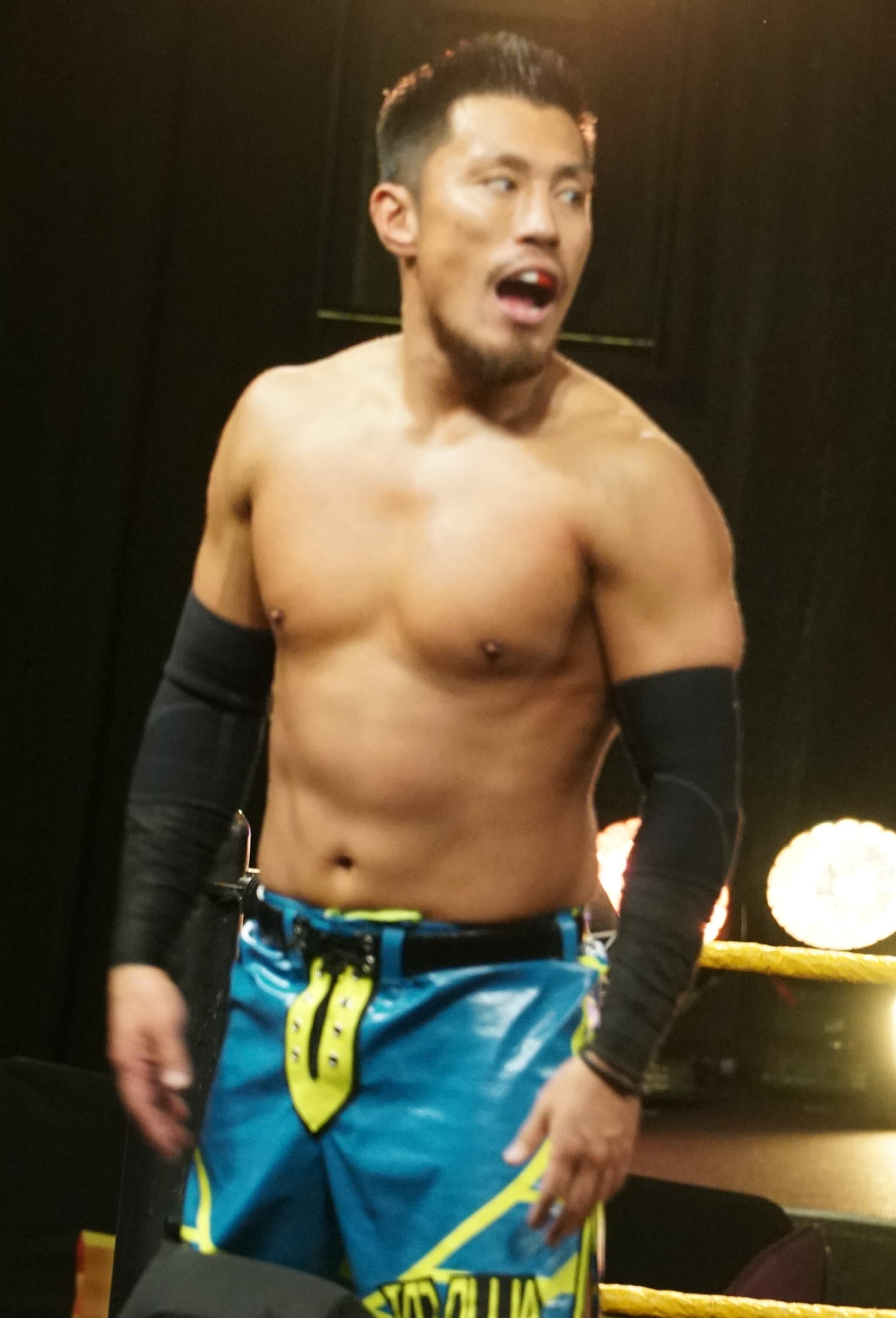
- Tozawa in 2018

Personal information
- Born: July 22, 1985 (age 41) Nishinomiya, Hyogo, Japan
- Children: 1

Professional wrestling career
- Ring name(s): Akira Tozawa; Tozawa; Tozawa Kengai
- Billed height: 5 ft 7 in (170 cm)
- Billed weight: 156 lb (71 kg)
- Billed from: Kobe, Japan
- Trained by: Kenichiro Arai; Masaaki Mochizuki
- Debut: April 3, 2005

Akira Tozawa (戸澤 陽, Tozawa Akira, born July 22, 1985) is a Japanese professional wrestler. As of 2016, he is signed to WWE, where he performs on the Raw brand under his real name and is one-half of the Alpha Academy with Otis.

Prior to signing with WWE, Tozawa had a 12-year run in Dragon Gate where he is a former Open the Brave Gate, Open the Twin Gate, Open the Triangle Gate and Open the Owarai Gate champion and the winner of the 2011 and 2012 Summer Adventure Tag League. He is also known for his year-long excursion to the United States, during which he performed for promotions such as Chikara, Dragon Gate USA, and Pro Wrestling Guerrilla. In WWE, he is a former one-time WWE Cruiserweight Champion and 16-time WWE 24/7 Champion.

== Professional wrestling career ==
=== Dragon Gate (2005–2010) ===
Tozawa was the third graduate of the Dragon Gate dojo to debut. After debuting, he underwent a 10 match trial series, but lost all 10 matches and was banished back to the dojo.

Tozawa returned in October 2005, teaming with fellow rookie Yuki Ono. He then teamed with Vangelis, a wrestler with a Nazi stripper gimmick. Kenichiro Arai intervened, much to Tozawa's resentment. When Tozawa defeated Naruki Doi during the Brave Gate League, Arai offered him a spot in the M2K stable. Tozawa, however, refused and stated his intention to run a stable of his own, creating a stable called Tozawa-juku. Even though Tozawa-juku bore his name, he was not necessarily the leader. Because of his backstage reputation as a troublemaker at the time, he was regularly held off of shows, progressed little, and was far beneath his stablemates Taku Iwasa, Kenichiro Arai, and even fellow troublemaker Ono in rank.

When Ono experienced newfound popularity and rank courtesy of a massive amount of weight gain, Tozawa began to bulk up as well, and he and Ono formed the Metabolic Brothers tag team within Tozawa-juku. They discarded the gakuran pants worn by the unit and wore silver tights and boots. However, injuries to Ono held the team back from any major success.

On July 11, 2008, after having teamed with Ono for a little over half a year, he appeared on a show with his gakuran pants on and announced that, in light of the success that new stablemates Shinobu and El Generico had brought to the unit (as well as constant pestering from Iwasa and Arai), he was going on a diet. After a diet trial series, where he actually had success, he brashly challenged Open the Triangle Gate Champions Masaaki Mochizuki, Don Fujii, and Magnitude Kishiwada to a title match against him, Iwasa & Arai on November 16. The trio agreed, but on the condition that Tozawa-juku would have to disband if his team lost. His team lost the match, bringing about the end of the unit, and he and his stablemates were given a graduation ceremony.

He and Iwasa began to team with Shingo Takagi in the weeks that followed, and then on December 19, he appealed to Shingo to form a new unit with him and Iwasa. Shingo agreed to it. On January 11, 2009, Dragon Kid joined up with him and the others, and Shingo gave the unit the name of Kamikaze. Tozawa participated in the Battle of Tokyo Tournament two weeks later, and made it to the finals before losing to Kagetora. Highlights of this time period were an Open the Brave Gate Championship challenge in 2009 against Cima and a "Loser is Banished to Dark Matches" match on May 5, 2010, against Kamikaze stablemate Cyber Kong, which he lost. After losing to Kong, Tozawa left Japan for an extended tour of the United States beginning in May 2010.

=== American exploits (2010–2016) ===
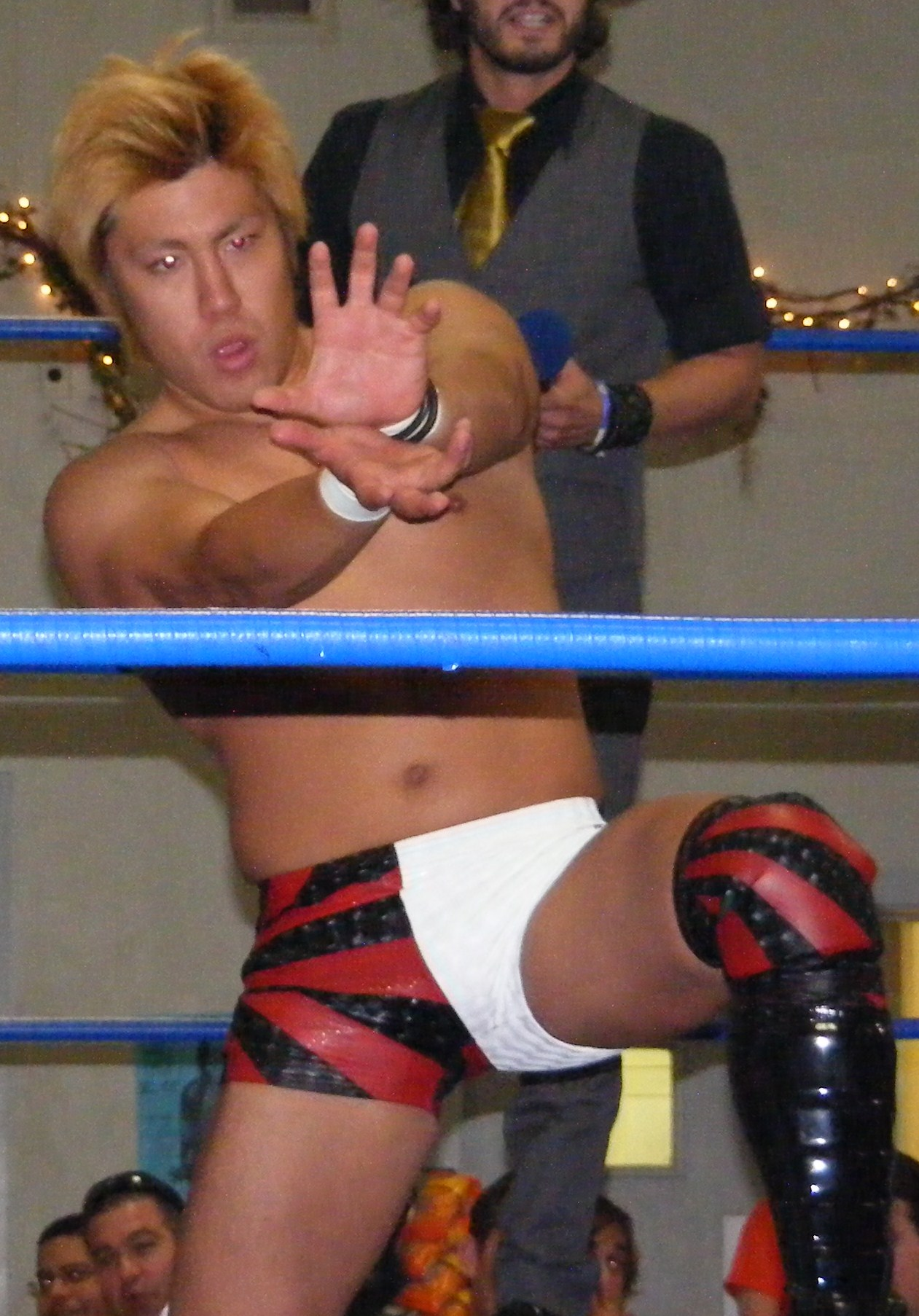
Tozawa in August 2010

On May 7, 2010, Tozawa made his debut for Dragon Gate's international expansion Dragon Gate USA, as a member of the group Kamikaze USA, teaming with Gran Akuma in a match, where they were defeated by Mike Quackenbush and Jigsaw.

Also in May 2010, Tozawa began working regularly for SoCal promotion Pro Wrestling Guerrilla (PWG). He made his PWG debut on May 9, during the Dynamite Duumvirate Tag Team Title Tournament, teaming with fellow Kamikaze partner Yamato in a first-round losing effort against The Briscoe Brothers (Jay and Mark Briscoe). At the following show on June 11, he defeated Scott Lost and on July 30 defeated Chris Sabin.

Tozawa also competed in Chikara's Young Lions Cup VIII in August 2010. He defeated Green Ant on August 27 in the first round, but was the last man eliminated from the six-way elimination semifinal match later that same night. On August 29, the final day of the tournament, Tozawa was defeated by Hallowicked in a singles match.

On September 5 Tozawa entered PWG's 2010 Battle of Los Angeles, defeating El Generico in his first round match. The following night, Tozawa was eliminated from the tournament by Chris Hero. The match was considered Tozawa's breakout performance, which got him noticed by the Dragon Gate office. Tozawa returned to PWG on December 11, 2010, losing to Kevin Steen. Afterwards, Steen recruited Tozawa as his partner for the March 4 DDT4 tournament.

Tozawa defeated Sami Callihan, Austin Aries, and BxB Hulk for Dragon Gate USA in January 2011, but run-ins with stablemates Jon Moxley and Yamato led to him being kicked out of Kamikaze USA. At the following Dragon Gate USA tapings on April 3, Tozawa defeated Moxley to earn an immediate shot at Yamato's Open the Freedom Gate Championship. He was, however, unsuccessful in his attempt to become the new champion. Tozawa was also unsuccessful in beating Pac for his Open the Brave Gate Championship on April 2, at Mercury Rising 2011.

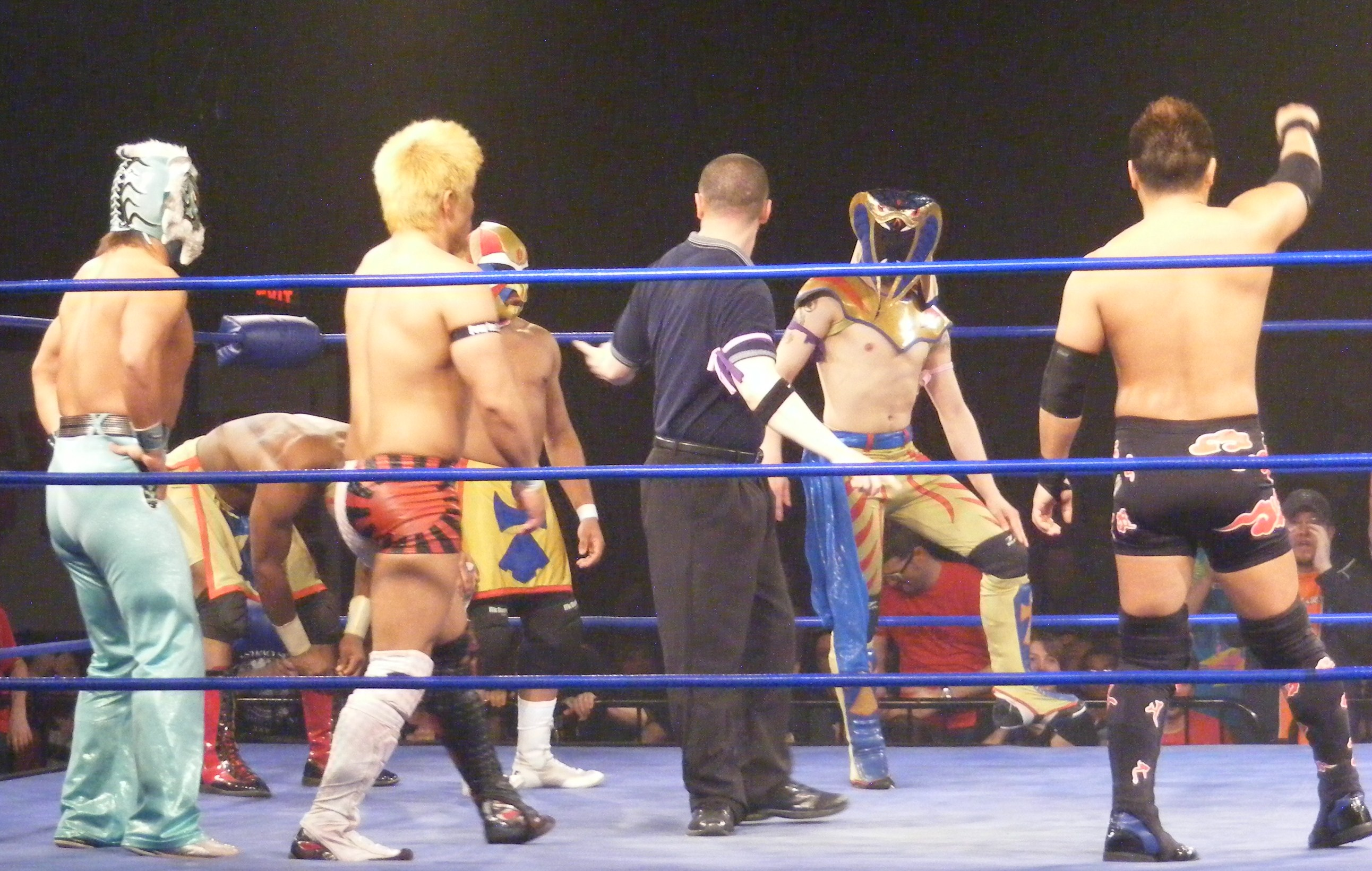
Tozawa (blonde hair), along with Kagetora and Super Shisa representing Dragon Gate in the 2011 King of Trios tournament, where they faced The Osirian Portal in the quarter-finals

On March 4, 2011, Tozawa and Kevin Steen, dubbing themselves the Nightmare Violence Connection, entered PWG's DDT4 tournament, upsetting the Briscoe Brothers in their first round match. After another upset victory over the ROH World Tag Team Champions, The Kings of Wrestling (Chris Hero and Claudio Castagnoli), he and Steen made it to the finals of the tournament, where they were defeated by The Young Bucks (Matt and Nick Jackson). On April 9, Tozawa was defeated by Low Ki in a singles match in PWG.

On April 15, Tozawa returned to Chikara, captaining Team Dragon Gate, consisting of himself, Kagetora and Super Shisa, in the 2011 King of Trios tournament. In the first round of the tournament, Team Dragon Gate defeated the Spectral Envoy (UltraMantis Black, Hallowicked and Frightmare). The following day, Team Dragon Gate was eliminated from the tournament in the quarterfinal stage by The Osirian Portal (Amasis, Hieracon and Ophidian). On April 17, the final day of the tournament, Tozawa faced Eddie Kingston in a losing effort.

On April 19, Tozawa made his debut for Evolve at the promotion's first live internet pay-per-view, facing Chuck Taylor in a losing effort. On May 15, 2011, in Austin, Texas, Tozawa captured the Anarchy Championship Wrestling (ACW) U–30 Young Gun Championship, the first title of his career, by defeating previous champion ACH, Arik Cannon and Gary Jay in a four-way match. He would lose the title to Gerald James six days later.

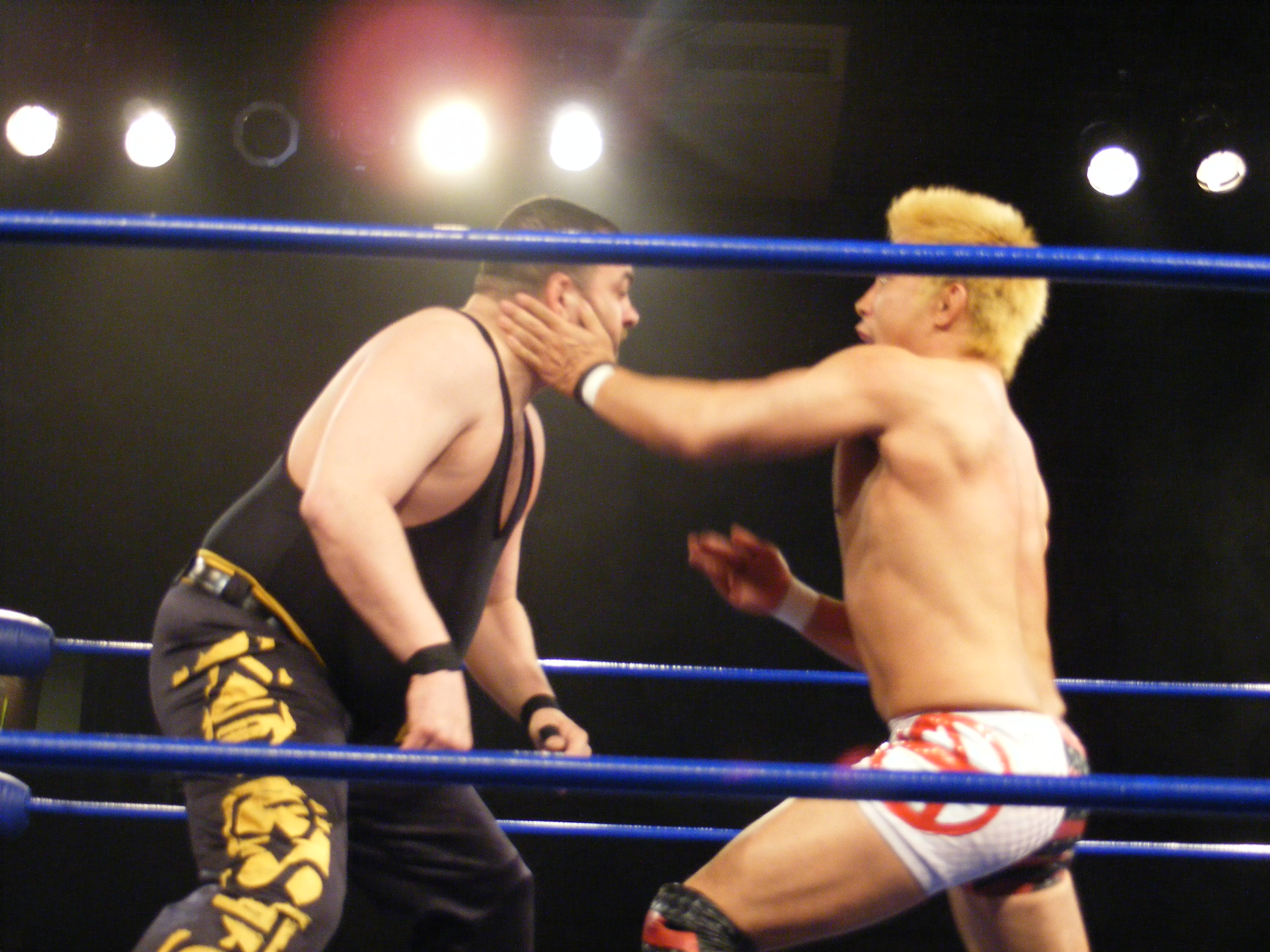
Tozawa (right) wrestling Eddie Kingston in 2011

On May 27, Tozawa returned to PWG for his final weekend with the promotion before his return to Japan. During the first night of All Star Weekend 8, Tozawa and Kevin Steen defeated El Generico and Ricochet in a tag team match. The following night, Tozawa wrestled two matches, first teaming with Steen to defeat the RockNES Monsters (Johnny Goodtime and Johnny Yuma) in a tag team match, before defeating Chris Hero in his PWG farewell match.

On June 3, Tozawa and Yamato failed to capture the Open the United Gate Championship when they lost to reigning champions Masato Yoshino and Pac at Fearless 2011. On June 28, 2012, Tozawa unsuccessfully challenged Johnny Gargano for the Open the Freedom Gate Championship. Tozawa received another shot at the title on July 28, 2013, at Dragon Gate USA's fourth anniversary event, but was again defeated by Gargano.

On July 24, 2015, Tozawa returned to PWG, losing to Ricochet, and on the first show of 2016, returned once again, losing to Zack Sabre Jr.

=== Return to Dragon Gate (2011–2016) ===
On June 8, 2011, Tozawa made his return to Dragon Gate, joining the stable Blood Warriors. Upon his return, Tozawa defeated Shingo Takagi on July 17 at Kobe Pro Wrestling Festival 2011. In August, Tozawa and fellow Blood Warriors member BxB Hulk took part in the 2011 Summer Adventure Tag League, where they ultimately defeated Masaaki Mochizuki and Yamato of rival group Junction Three to win the tournament. On September 16, Tozawa defeated rival Yamato in a no ropes, no disqualification match. This led to Tozawa challenging Masaaki Mochizuki for the Open the Dream Gate Championship on October 13, but Tozawa was defeated. On December 1, Tozawa and BxB Hulk defeated Kagetora and Susumu Yokosuka to win the vacant Open the Twin Gate Championship, Tozawa's first title in Dragon Gate. On January 19, 2012, Tozawa and Hulk turned on Blood Warriors leader Cima, causing him to lose a ten-man "Loser Leaves Unit" tag team match; as a result, Cima was kicked out of Blood Warriors. After this match, Tozawa assumed the leadership role in Blood Warriors. On January 29, Tozawa made a one night return to PWG, when he teamed with Kevin Steen and Super Dragon in a six-man tag team main event, where they were defeated by El Generico, Masato Yoshino and Pac. On February 9, the Tozawa-led Blood Warriors won their feud with Junction Three by defeating them in a fourteen-man elimination tag team match, forcing their rival group to disband. On March 1, Tozawa renamed the Blood Warriors to Mad Blankey. Three days later, he and BxB Hulk lost the Open the Twin Gate Championship to Jimmy Kagetora and Jimmy Susumu.

On July 22, Tozawa received another shot at the Open the Dream Gate Championship, but was this time defeated by Cima. On August 19, Tozawa, BxB Hulk and Naoki Tanisaki defeated Cima, Gamma and Magnitude Kishiwada to win the 2012 Summer Adventure Tag League and the vacant Open the Triangle Gate Championship. They lost the title to Kaettekita Veteran-gun (Gamma, Hub and Magnitude Kishiwada) on October 21. On May 5, 2013, Tozawa received another shot at the Open the Dream Gate Championship in the main event of Dead or Alive 2013, but was again defeated by Cima. On June 15, Tozawa and BxB Hulk regained the Open the Twin Gate Championship from Shingo Takagi and Yamato, when Yamato turned on Takagi and joined Mad Blankey. Tozawa and Hulk lost the title to Naruki Doi and Ricochet on July 21. On August 1, after Tozawa had led Mad Blankey to victory against -akatsuki- in a match, where the losing stable would have to disband, the rest of Mad Blankey turned on him, kicking him out of the group and assuming Yamato as their new leader.

On August 30, Tozawa formed a new stable with former Mad Blankey stablemate Uhaa Nation and Shingo Takagi. On September 12, the three were joined by Masato Yoshino, Ricochet and Shachihoko Boy, forming a stable named Monster Express. On December 22, Tozawa and Takagi defeated Naruki Doi and Yamato to win the Open the Twin Gate Championship. They lost the title to Eita and T-Hawk on July 20, 2014. On February 28, 2015, Tozawa won his first singles title in Dragon Gate, when he defeated Kzy for the Open the Brave Gate Championship. On March 29, Tozawa also won the Open the Owarai Gate Championship by defeating Yosuke♥Santa Maria. On November 1, Tozawa lost the Open the Brave Gate Championship to Kotoka in a three-way match, which also involved Naoki Tanizaki. On November 14, 2015, Tozawa lost the Open the Owarai Gate Championship to referee Mr. Nakagawa via fan support. On September 22, 2016, Tozawa unsuccessfully challenged Yamato for the Dream Gate Championship. On September 25, he announced that he would be wrestling his final Dragon Gate match on November 3, before moving to the United States to work for WWE. In his send-off match, he teamed with Masato Yoshino and Naruki Doi in a losing effort against the team of Shingo Takagi, Yamato, and BxB Hulk.

=== WWE (2016–present) ===
==== 205 Live (2016–2019) ====
On March 31, 2016, Tozawa was announced as a participant in WWE's Global Cruiserweight Series tournament, which was later renamed the "Cruiserweight Classic". The tournament began on June 23 with Tozawa defeating Kenneth Johnson in his first round match. On July 14, Tozawa defeated Jack Gallagher in his second round match. On August 26, Tozawa was eliminated from the tournament in the quarterfinals by Gran Metalik.

On the September 5 episode of Raw, Tozawa was announced as part of WWE's upcoming cruiserweight division. On November 2, Tozawa was announced as a roster member for the upcoming cruiserweight-centric 205 Live show. On February 6, 2017, Tozawa made his debut on Raw, defeating Drew Gulak. In June, Tozawa was recruited by Titus O'Neil to the "Titus Worldwide" stable and entered in a feud with the Cruiserweight Champion Neville. At Great Balls of Fire event, Tozawa was unsuccessful in his first championship opportunity against Neville; however, he pinned Neville in a tag team match the next night. On the August 14 episode of Raw, Tozawa defeated Neville to win the Cruiserweight Championship. However, at SummerSlam, he dropped the title to Neville, ending the reign at 6 days. In late 2017, Tozawa quietly left Titus Worldwide.

On the October 10 episode of 205 Live, Tozawa was attacked on the ramp by Drew Gulak, which began a rivalry. Tozawa was out of action for a few weeks until he returned on the October 31 episode of 205 Live, where he defeated Gulak. On the November 21 episode of 205 Live, Tozawa defeated Gulak in a Street Fight, ending their feud. In February 2018, Tozawa formed a tag team with Hideo Itami, and they defeated Gran Metalik and Lince Dorado on the March 13 episode of 205 Live, but got into a confrontation with them and their ally Kalisto post-match. After trading victories between each other, they finally lost a tornado tag team match to Metalik and Dorado on the April 17 episode of 205 Live after Tozawa accidentally kicked Itami. On the May 1 episode of 205 Live, Tozawa and Itami were defeated by The Brian Kendrick and Gentleman Jack Gallagher after another miscommunication between the two, after which Itami shoved Tozawa, thus ending their partnership. The following week, Tozawa was defeated by Itami.

==== 24/7 Champion (2019–2022) ====
On the January 2, 2019, episode of 205 Live, Tozawa defeated Drew Gulak to qualify for the fatal four-way match at Royal Rumble for the Cruiserweight Championship, which was won by champion Buddy Murphy. On the January 29 episode of 205 Live, Tozawa defeated Hideo Itami in Itami's final match with the company. On the February 14, episode of 205 Live, Tozawa defeated Cedric Alexander, Humberto Carrillo and Lio Rush to become the number one contender for the Cruiserweight Championship at the Elimination Chamber, where he was defeated by Murphy. As part of the 2019 draft, Tozawa was drafted to the Raw brand. On the November 18 episode of Raw, Tozawa made his debut on the brand, where he was defeated by Buddy Murphy. At Survivor Series, Tozawa represented Raw in an Interbrand triple threat match for the NXT Cruiserweight Championship, which was won by NXT's Lio Rush. On the December 23 episode of Raw, Tozawa captured the 24/7 Championship after pinning champion R-Truth, but lost the title to Santa Claus. On April 12, 2020, Tozawa was announced as a participant in the Interim NXT Cruiserweight Championship Tournament, representing Group B in the tournament. He defeated Isaiah "Swerve" Scott in his first match and Gentleman Jack Gallagher in his second match, but lost to El Hijo del Fantasma, thus leaving him with two wins in the tournament, failing to advance to the finals.

At Backlash, during a segment between The Street Profits and The Viking Raiders, Tozawa appeared with a gang of ninjas on motorcycles, turning heel. On the June 22 episode of Raw, Tozawa defeated R-Truth to become the 24/7 Champion for the second time, only to lose the title back to Truth one week later. On the August 3 episode of Monday Night Raw, Tozawa won the 24/7 Championship for a third time in a triple threat match against champion Shelton Benjamin and R-Truth. A week later R-Truth, disguised as a Tozawa's ninjas, pinned him ending his third reign. He would win the title five other times. On the February 15 episode of Raw, he pinned R-Truth backstage to win the 24/7 Championship but lost it to Bad Bunny after being attacked by Damian Priest, ending his reign at 28 seconds. Afterwards, he and R-Truth continued feuding over the title, alongside Drew Gulak and others. When Reggie won the title after he was abandoned by Nia Jax and Shayna Baszler, he and R-Truth began feuding with him, even building a temporary alliance with Drake Maverick. On the September 27 episode of Raw, Tozawa would be quickly defeated by Keith "Bearcat" Lee. In early 2022, after spending months with both him and Tamina Snuka trying to win the 24/7 Title, Tozawa and Tamina ended up becoming lovers and on March 28 they got (kayfabe) engaged. On April 18, Tozawa won the championship for the fifth time by pinning his partner, Tamina, during their wedding ceremony. Tozawa then lost the championship back to Dana Brooke. Later that month, due to him being unable to help her win the title, she filed for divorce. On May 30, 2022, at Raw, he pinned her during the Miz TV winning the title. On the November 14 episode of Raw, Tozawa turned face after beating Baron Corbin and JBL in a game of cards. He would subsequently return to wearing more traditional ring gear as opposed to his ninja gimmick.

==== Alpha Academy (2023–present) ====
Tozawa joined Alpha Academy and was assigned as a "junior member" of the stable in a Digital Exclusive before the October 23, 2023, episode of Raw. In a bid to prove himself to the stable, Tozawa challenged Bronson Reed to a match but lost. The following day, Tozawa appeared on Night 1 of NXT: Halloween Havoc and stole Noam Dar's NXT Heritage Cup. Tozawa would return the Cup to Dar on Night 2 before managing to spook Dar into a match for the Cup on the following week's NXT but lost the match 2-1 under British Round Rules.

In April 2024, Alpha Academy leader Chad Gable turned heel after failing to win the Intercontinental Championship multiple times, with Gable assigning blame that he had spent too much time training his "loser" stablemates and declaring that the stable's focus was to help win Gable the Intercontinental Championship. After weeks of mistreatment by Gable on the rest of the stable for not assisting him to win the title by cheating, Tozawa, alongside stablemates Otis and Maxxine Dupri, walked out of Gable on the June 17 episode of Raw, who subsequently left Alpha Academy. Otis then took over as the leader of the stable. On the July 15 episode of Raw, Otis, Dupri and Tozawa agreed to team up with The New Day's Xavier Woods in his feud against The Final Testament. On the following week, the team of Otis, Tozawa and Woods were defeated by The Final Testatement's Karrion Kross and The Authors of Pain (Akam and Rezar) in a six-man tag team match. After the match, Gable, together with the newly-aligned Creed Brothers (Julius and Brutus), continued to convince Otis, Tozawa and Dupri to reunite. Otis refused and were beaten down by Gable and The Creed Brothers.

At the 2025 Royal Rumble, Tozawa entered the Royal Rumble as entrant #8, but was attacked by Carmelo Hayes, which caused him to be injured. YouTuber IShowSpeed replaced him and entered instead.

In May 5, 2025, after Otis was defeated by Rusev, Tozawa unsuccessfully attempted to stop Rusev's further attack on his stablemate. Tozawa was close to being choked out by Rusev when stuck in his prolonged submission after the bell but was saved by Sheamus, who stared Rusev down. After the loss, a new wrinkle in his character was teased referring to him as a potential disciple of the Hart Dungeon under Natalya's training.

On the January 26, 2026 episode of Raw, Alpha Academy defeated New Day, Creed Brothers, and Los Americanos in a fatal four-way number one contenders match for the World Tag Team titles. On February 9, Alpha Academy was defeated in a title match by the reigning champions The Usos.

== Other media ==
Tozawa made his video game debut as a playable character in WWE 2K18 and later appeared in WWE 2K19, WWE 2K20, WWE 2K22, WWE 2K23 and WWE 2K24, WWE 2K25 and WWE 2K26.

== Championships and accomplishments ==
- Anarchy Championship Wrestling
  - ACW U–30 Young Gun Championship (1 time)
- Cultaholic
  - Most Underrated Wrestler (2019)
- Dragon Gate
  - Open the Brave Gate Championship (1 time)
  - Open the Owarai Gate Championship (1 time)
  - Open the Triangle Gate Championship (2 times) – with BxB Hulk and Naoki Tanisaki (1), Masato Yoshino and T-Hawk (1)
  - Open the Twin Gate Championship (3 times) – with BxB Hulk (2), and Shingo Takagi (1)
  - Open The Triangle Gate Championship Tournament (2015)
  - Summer Adventure Tag League (2011) – with BxB Hulk
  - Summer Adventure Tag League (2012) – with BxB Hulk and Naoki Tanisaki
- Pro Wrestling Illustrated
  - Ranked No. 92 of the top 500 singles wrestlers in the PWI 500 in 2018
- WWE
  - WWE 24/7 Championship (16 times)
  - WWE Cruiserweight Championship (1 time)
  - NXT North American Championship Invitational (2018)

== Luchas de Apuestas record ==
Winner (wager)	Loser (wager)	Location	Event	Date	Notes
Akira Tozawa (hair)	Super Shenlong III (mask)	Tokyo, Japan	Dragon Gate event	August 1, 2013	(Note: This was an eight-man tag team Mask vs. Hair match, where Tozawa, BxB Hulk, Kzy, Mondai Ryu and Yamato faced Shenlong, Chihiro Tominaga, Cyber Kong and Shingo Takagi.)
