= List of Dragongate personnel =

Dragongate is a Japanese professional wrestling promotion that was founded in 2004. This is a list of their current wrestlers that appear on their shows, as well as their ‘unit’ (team, faction). Other notes included are those of injured wrestlers, championships wrestlers hold, and if they're a sporadic or dormant character. This page is kept up to date with changes on Dragongate's official website.

== Roster ==
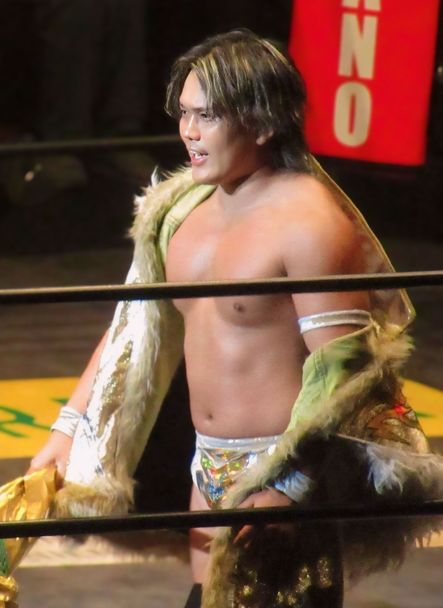
Riiita

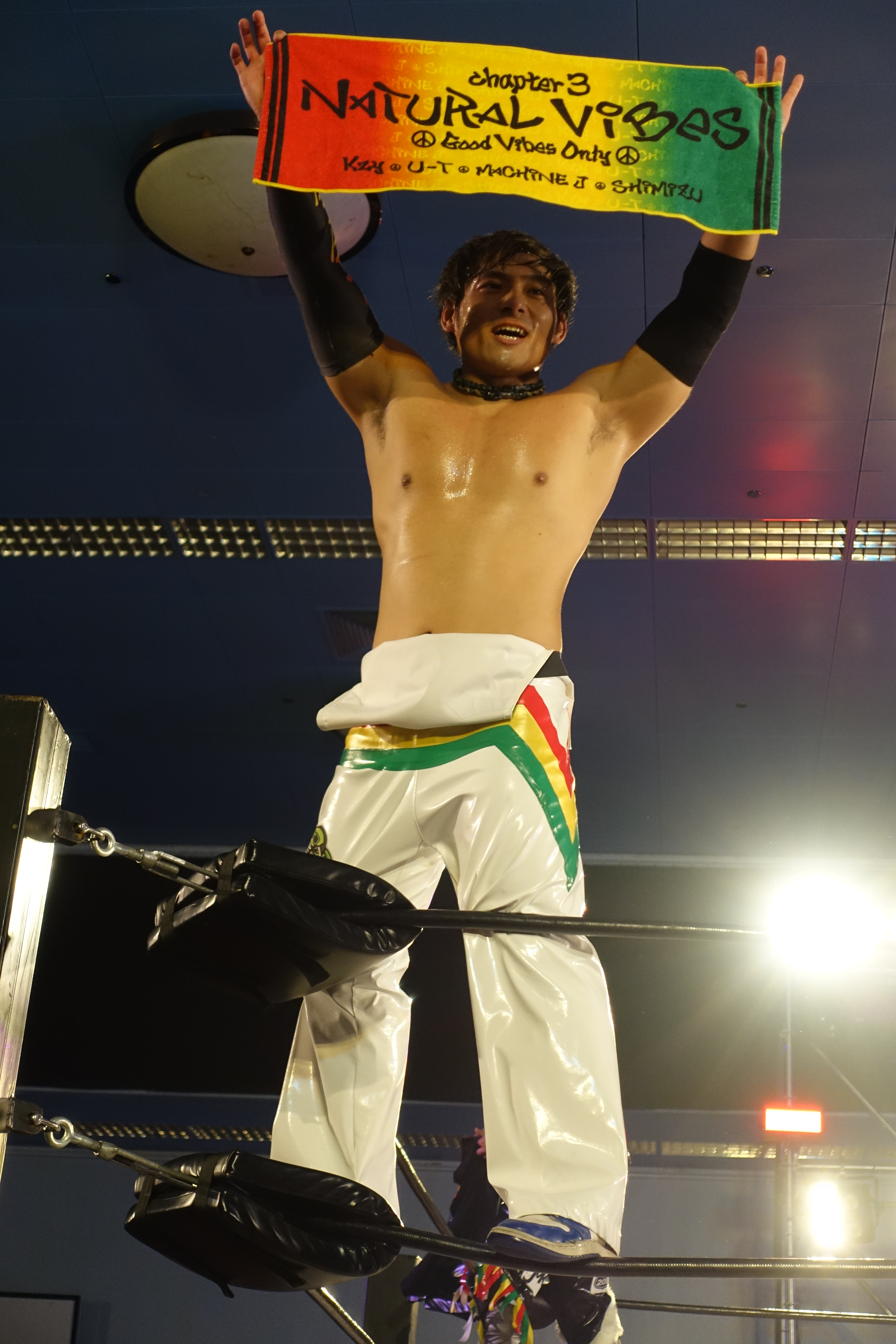
Jacky Kamei

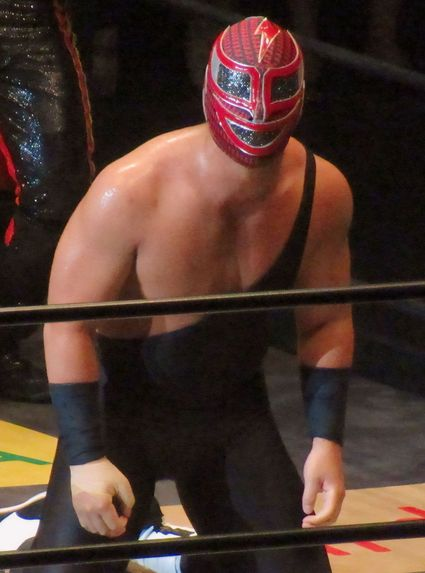
Strong Machine J

This is a list of professional wrestlers who currently wrestle for Dragongate. This list also acknowledges which stable (referred to by Dragongate as "units") a wrestler is a part of – this is listed as it is considered by the company to be a vital part of Dragongate. "(L)" indicates the leader of the group. Executive officers, referees and ring announcers are also listed. A large part of wrestlers went under separate classes in the Toryumon and Dragongate Trueborn systems, so their debut classes and year of official debut are provided (as does outsiders' debut classes or training schools).

There are six central units in Dragongate:

- Gajadokuro
- Love & Peace
- Natural Vibes
- Paradox
- XenisS
- Xenostal Nova

There is another unit that is not central, and appears based either on location or another circumstance. Kung Fu Masters 2 show up to Dragongate shows when they are in a city in Japan that has a Chinatown, or has a greatly-sized Chinese expat or ancestral population.

=== Wrestlers ===
Ring name	Real name	Unit	Debut class	Notes
@KEY	Akihiro Sahara	Natural Vibes	Future (2024)	
B×B Hulk	Terumasa Ishihara	Paradox	NEX (2004)	
Ben-K	Futa Nakamura	Love & Peace	NEX (2016)	
BIG BOSS Shimizu	Ryotsu Shimizu	Gajadokuro	NEX (2013)	
Don Fujii	Tatsuki Fujii	N/A	Toryumon (1997)	
Dragon Kid	Nobuyoshi Nakamura	Paradox	Toryumon (1997)	
El Cielo	Unknown (speculated)	XenisS	N/A	
Flamita	Undisclosed	Natural Vibes	Arkangel de la Muerte (2009)	Freelancer
Genki Horiguchi	Hiromasa Horiguchi	N/A	Toryumon (1998)	
Gianni Valletta	Wayne Pace	N/A	Varsity Pro Wrestling (2011)	Signed to Pro Wrestling Malta
GuC	Daiki Yanagiuchi	Natural Vibes	Future (2023)	
Ho Ho Lun	Wong Yuk Lun	Kung Fu Masters 2	N/A (2009)	English commentator
Homare	Homare Kato	Xenostal Nova	Future (2024)	
Hyo	Hyo Watanabe	Love & Peace	NEX (2016)	Open the Triangle Gate Champion
ISHIN	Ishin Iihashi	Gajadokuro	Future (2021)	Open the Twin Gate Champion
Jacky Kamei	Taketo Kamei	Love & Peace	Future (2019)	Open the Triangle Gate Champion
Jason Lee	Liáo Gōng-lín	Gajadokuro	N/A (2009)	
Jiro Shimbashi	Ryuta Sugihara	N/A	Future (2025)	
KAGETORA	Fumiyuki Hashimoto	Paradox	Toryumon X (2002)	RDPW Sou Ryuo Tag Team Champion
KAI	Atsushi Sakai	Gajadokuro	Mutojuku (2007; via Animal Hamaguchi & Keiji Muto)	
Kazuma Kimura	Kazuma Kimura	Xenostal Nova	Future (2025)	
Kenichiro Arai	Kenichiro Arai	N/A	Toryumon (1998)	Freelancer
Kota Minoura	Kota Minoura	XenisS	NEX (2018)	
Kzy	Kazuki Sawada	Natural Vibes	NEX (2006)	
La Estrella	Unknown	N/A	Future (2020)	Freelancer; Mexican representative
Lucky Oshima	Koki Oshima	Bang☆Bang Piero	Future (2026)	
Luis Mante	Luis Meza Casas	N/A	Astuto (2005)	
Madoka Kikuta	Madoka Kikuda	Gajadokuro (L)	Future (2020)	
Masaaki Mochizuki	Masaaki Mochizuki	N/A	Buko Dojo (1994; via Koji Kitao)	
Mochizuki Jr.	Ryoto Mochizuki	Love & Peace	Future (2022)	
Mondai Ryu	Daisuke Kimata	N/A	NEX (2006)	
Naruki Doi	Naruki Doi	Paradox	Toryumon 2000 Project (2000)	Freelancer
Punch Tominaga	Chihiro Tominaga	N/A	NEX (2011)	Dragongate Studios audio engineer
Riiita	Takumi Hayakawa	Love & Peace	Future (2021)	Open the Triangle Gate Champion
Ryo Saito	Ryo Saito	N/A	Toryumon (1997)	On-screen general manager
Ryoya Tanaka	Ryoya Tanaka	Xenostal Nova (L)	Future (2023)	
Ryu Fuda	Ryu Fuda	Gajadokuro	Future (2021)	
Shachihoko BOY	Unknown	N/A	Toryumon 2000 Project (2002)	
Strong Machine J	Unknown	Natural Vibes (L)	Future (2019)	
Susumu Yokosuka	Susumu Mochizuki	Paradox	Toryumon (1998)	RDPW Sou Ryuo Tag Team Champion
Takashi	Takashi Yoshida	N/A	NEX via Inoki Dojo (2004)	Freelancer
Tsujiguchi Big Circus	Dai Tsujiguchi	Bang☆Bang Piero	Future (2026)	
Último Dragón	Yoshihiro Asai	N/A	NJPW Dojo (1987; via Kotetsu Yamamoto)	Founder of Toryumon
U-T	Yūta Tanaka	Natural Vibes	NEX (2013)	
YAMATO	Masato Onodera	Paradox (L)	NEX (2005)	
Yasushi Kanda	Yasushi Kanda	N/A	Toryumon (1998)	
Yoshiki Kato	Yoshiki Kato	Gajadokuro	Future (2022)	Open the Dream Gate Champion Open the Twin Gate Champion
Yosuke♡Santa Maria	Yosuke Watanabe	N/A	NEX (2011)	Dual-signed to Marvelous
Yuki Yoshioka	Yuki Yoshioka	XenisS	NEX (2016)	

=== Dormant/Sporadic characters ===
Ring name	Real name	Unit	Notes
Bokutimo Dragon	Ryotsu Shimizu	N/A	Alter ego of Big Boss Shimizu
Gianni "Myon Myon" Valletta	Wayne Pace	Love & Peace	Alter ego of Gianni Valletta
Ho Lee	Hiromasa Horiguchi	Kung Fu Masters 2	Alter ego of Genki Horiguchi
Johnson Florida	Takayuki Yagi	N/A	Alter ego of referee Takayuki Yagi
Karaoke Machine	Tatsuki Fujii	N/A	Alter ego of Don Fujii
Keirinman	Unknown	N/A	
Mozoku Tominaga	Chihiro Tominaga	N/A	Alter ego of Punch Tominaga; Ryukyu Dragon Pro-Wrestling
Riichi Tominaga	Chihiro Tominaga	Kung Fu Masters 2	Alter ego of Punch Tominaga
Shachihoko Machine	Unknown	N/A	Alter ego of Shachihoko Boy
Shisa BOY	Unknown	N/A	Alter ego of Shachihoko Boy
Shin Sakura Katsushika Hirota	Sakura Hirota	N/A	Open the Owarai Gate Champion
Strong Machine F	Tatsuki Fujii	N/A	Alter ego of Don Fujii
Super Shenlong II	Daisuke Kimata	N/A	Alter ego of Mondai Ryu
Super Shenlong III	Yosuke Watanabe	N/A	Alter ego of Yosuke♡Santa Maria

=== Guests ===
Ring name	Real name	Unit	Notes
Drake Morimatsu	Yuki Morimatsu	N/A	
El Cucuy	Unknown	N/A	Signed to Pro Wrestling Revolution
Katsuo	Yuki Ono	N/A	
LEONA	Reona Fujinami	N/A	Signed to Dradition
Marcus Mathers	Marc Anthony Mattiacci Jr.	N/A	WWE ID
Oni El Bendito	Unknown	N/A	
Sangre Azteca Jr.	Unknown	N/A	Signed to Michinoku Pro-Wrestling
Shingo Takagi	Shin Takagi	Unbound Co. (NJPW)	Signed to New Japan Pro-Wrestling
Shuji Kondo	Shuji Kondo	N/A	
Toru Owashi	Toru Ito	N/A	
Tristan Moody	Tristan Moody	N/A	

=== Staff ===
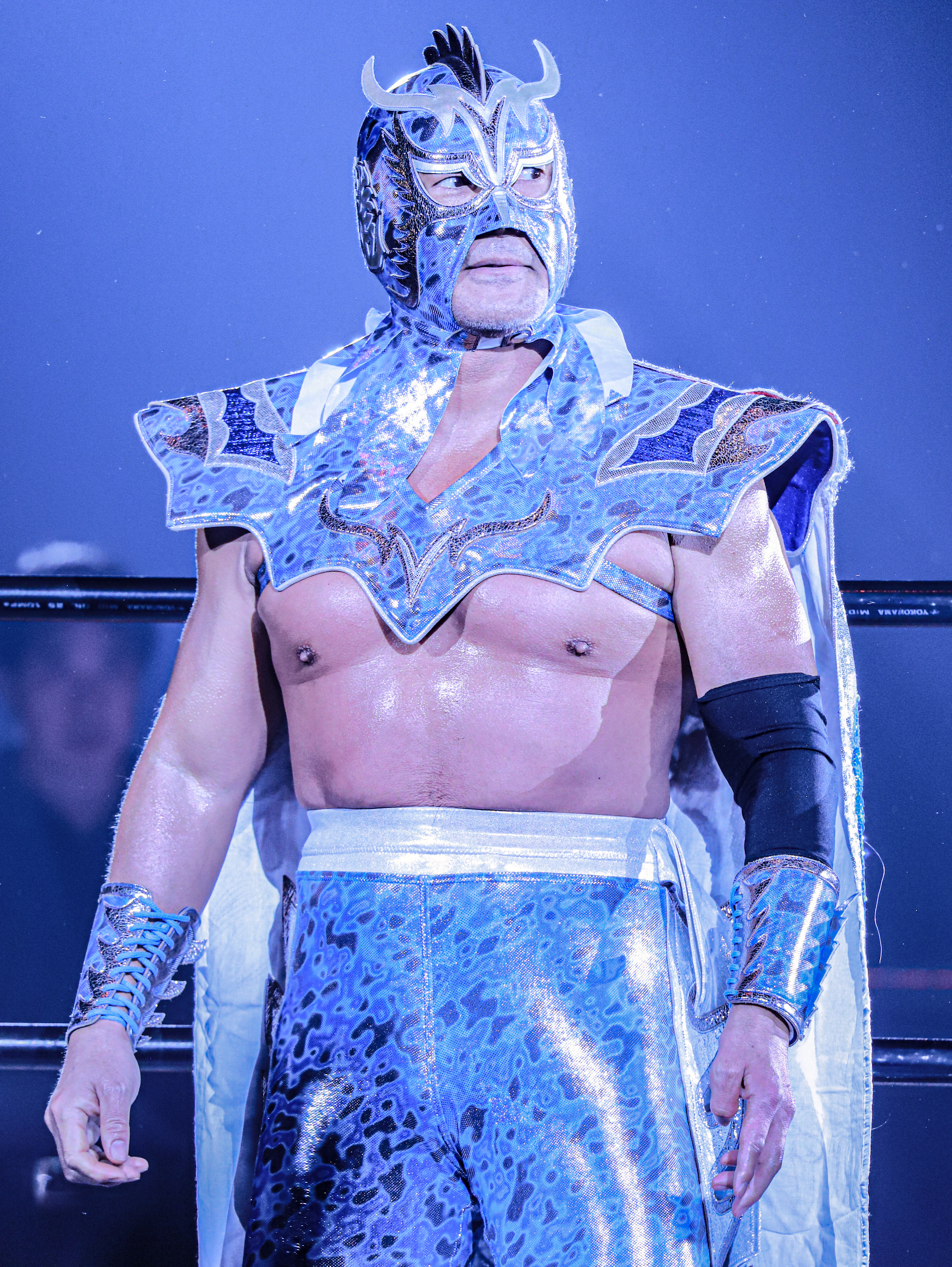
Último Dragón

Name	Role
Eiichi Fujimoto	Photographer
Jae Church	English commentator
Katsuya Ichikawa	Play-by-play commentary and backstage interviewer
Mr. Nakagawa	Referee
Naoto Kikuchi	Ring announcer and official record keeper
Shoki Ono	Ring announcer
Takayuki Yagi	Referee and general manager
Toru Kido	Owner and CEO
Yatsuka Nakazawa	Dragongate Records
Yoshihiro Asai	Senior advisor

== Alumni ==
=== Former wrestlers ===
- Akira Tozawa
- Anthony W. Mori
- "brother" YASSHI
- CIMA
- Eita
- El Lindaman
- Gamma
- El Apache
- The Great Sasuke
- HUB
- Jack Evans
- Jun Ogawauchi
- Jushin Thunder Liger
- Kaito Ishida
- KAZMA SAKAMOTO
- Keisuke Okuda
- Kensuke Sasaki
- Kikutaro
- Kinta Tamaoka
- K-ness.
- Konomama Ichikawa
- Kouji Shishido
- Magnitude Kishiwada
- Magnum TOKYO
- Masato Yoshino
- Matt Sydal
- Milano Collection A. T.
- Mototsugu Shimizu
- Naoki Tanizaki
- Oji Shiiba
- PAC
- Rich Swann
- Ricky Marvin
- Ricochet
- SB KENTo
- Shingo Takagi
- Shinobu
- Shun Skywalker
- Super Shisa
- SUWA
- Taku Iwasa
- Takuma Fujiwara
- T-Hawk
- Takehiro Yamamura
- Taku Iwasa
- Takuya Sugawara
- TARU
- Tigers Mask
- Uhaa Nation

=== Notable past units ===
- Aagan Issou
- Antias
- Blood Generation
- Blood Warriors
- Crazy MAX
- D'Courage
- Do Fixer
- Gold Class
- Italian Connection
- Jimmyz
- Junction Three
- Los Perros del Mal de Japón
- M2K
- Mad Blankey
- MaxiMuM
- Millenials
- Monster Express
- Muscle Outlaw'z
- New Hazard
- Over Generation
- Psypatra
- Real Hazard
- R.E.D.
- Tokyo Gurentai
- Tozawa-juku
- Tribe Vanguard
- Typhoon
- VerserK
- Warriors
- WORLD-1
- WORLD-1 International
- Z-Brats
