= Gate of Destiny =

The Gate of Destiny
- Promotions: Dragon Gate
- First event: 2007
- Signature matches: Multiple

The Gate of Destiny is an annual signature professional wrestling pay-per-view (PPV) created and promoted by the Japanese professional wrestling promotion Dragon Gate. The event has been held annually since 2007 as a pay-per-view (PPV). Attendance stayed constant until 2009. Since 2009, the attendance increased until 2011 and the 2012 Gate of Destiny featured also Dragon Gate USA championship matches. On 2013, the attendance increased with 7100 persons. The best attendance was 7150 persons. The event is part of the Crown Gate tour. The 2020 edition of the event was held with a limited audience due to in part to the ongoing COVID-19 pandemic at the time.

== Event chronology ==
No.	Event	Date	City	Venue	Attendance
1	The Gate of Destiny 2007	November 25, 2007	Osaka, Japan	Osaka Prefectural Gymnasium	6,500
2	The Gate of Destiny 2008	November 16, 2008	Osaka, Japan	Osaka Prefectural Gymnasium	6,500
3	The Gate of Destiny 2009	November 23, 2009	Osaka, Japan	Osaka Prefectural Gymnasium	6,500
4	The Gate of Destiny 2010	November 23, 2010	Osaka, Japan	Osaka Prefectural Gymnasium	7,000
5	The Gate of Destiny 2011	November 16, 2011	Osaka, Japan	Osaka Prefectural Gymnasium	7,000
6	The Gate of Destiny 2012	October 21, 2012	Osaka, Japan	Osaka Prefectural Gymnasium	6,800
7	The Gate of Destiny 2013	November 3, 2013	Osaka, Japan	Bodymaker Colosseum	7,100
8	The Gate of Destiny 2014	November 2, 2014	Osaka, Japan	Bodymaker Colosseum	7,150
9	The Gate of Destiny 2015	November 1, 2015	Osaka, Japan	Edion Arena Osaka	7,150
10	The Gate of Destiny 2016	November 3, 2016	Osaka, Japan	Edion Arena Osaka	7,150
11	The Gate of Destiny 2017	November 3, 2017	Osaka, Japan	Edion Arena Osaka	5,500
12	The Gate of Destiny 2018	November 3, 2018	Osaka, Japan	Edion Arena Osaka	3,150
13	The Gate of Destiny 2019	November 4, 2019	Osaka, Japan	Edion Arena Osaka	3,120
14	The Gate of Destiny 2020	November 3, 2020	Osaka, Japan	Edion Arena Osaka	1,885
15	The Gate of Destiny 2021	November 3, 2021	Osaka, Japan	Edion Arena Osaka	1,685
16	The Gate of Destiny 2022	November 6, 2022	Osaka, Japan	Edion Arena Osaka	2,208
17	The Gate of Destiny 2023	November 5, 2023	Osaka, Japan	Edion Arena Osaka	2,408
17	The Gate of Destiny 2024	November 3, 2024	Osaka, Japan	Edion Arena Osaka	2,686

== 2007 ==
No.	Results	Stipulations	Times
1^{P}	"Hollywood" Stalker Ichikawa, Shinobu and Shisa Boy defeated Yūki Ōno, m.c.KZ and Ape Kimata	Six-man tag team match	4:36
2	Super Shisa and Typhoon (Pac and Anthony W. Mori) defeated New Hazard (Yamato, BxB Hulk and El Generico)	Six-man tag team match	10:05
3	Muscle Outlaw'z (Genki Horiguchi and Arik Cannon) defeated Tozawa-juku (Akira Tozawa and Kenichiro Arai)	Tag team match	8:22
4	Magnitude Kishiwada defeated Cyber Kong	Singles match	11:28
5	Mushozoku (Masaaki Mochizuki, Don Fujii and K-ness) (c) defeated Muscle Outlaw'z (Gamma and Yasushi Kanda) and Nosawa Rongai	Six-man tag team match for the Open the Triangle Gate Championship	14:26
6	Dragon Kid defeated Kenzo Suzuki	Singles match	13:04
7	Muscle Outlaw'z (Naruki Doi and Masato Yoshino) (c) defeated Typhoon (Susumu Yokosuka and Ryo Saito)	Tag team match for the Open the Twin Gate Championship	28:50
8	Cima (c) defeated Shingo Takagi	Singles match for the Open the Dream Gate Championship	31:31
(c) / – the champion(s) heading into the match; P / – the match was broadcast on the pre-show

== 2008 ==
No.	Results	Stipulations	Times
1^{P}	Super Shisa and Shisa Boy defeated Shinobu and m.c.KZ	Tag team match	5:39
2	Typhoon (Ryo Saito and Anthony W. Mori) defeated Real Hazard (Genki Horiguchi and Yasushi Kanda)	Tag team match	8:18
3	Shiro Koshinaka defeated "Hollywood" Stalker Ichikawa	5th Singles match in the "Hollywood" Stalker Ichikawa Bosou 10 Match Series	3:43
4	Black Hulk defeated Gamma Daiou by countout	Singles match	14:50
5	Zetsurins (Masaaki Mochizuki, Don Fujii and Magnitude Kishiwada) (c) defeated Tozawa-juku (Akira Tozawa, Kenichiro Arai and Taku Iwasa)	Six-man tag team match for the Open the Triangle Gate Championship; if Tozawa-juku lost, they would have to disband	12:28
6	Real Hazard (Yamato and Cyber Kong) (c) defeated World-1 (Naruki Doi and Naoki Tanizaki)	Tag team match for the Open the Twin Gate Championship	23:56
7	Masato Yoshino (c) defeated Dragon Kid	Singles match for the Open the Brave Gate Championship	26:53
8	Shingo Takagi (c) defeated Susumu Yokosuka	Singles match for the Open the Dream Gate Championship	34:03
(c) / – the champion(s) heading into the match; P / – the match was broadcast on the pre-show

== 2009 ==
No.	Results	Stipulations	Times
1^{P}	Super Shisa and Shisa Boy defeated "Hollywood" Stalker Ichikawa and Kotoka	Tag team match	4:27
2	Anthony Turbo Mori and Turboness defeated Real Hazard (Kenichiro Arai and Kzy)	Tag team match	7:12
3	Susumu Yokosuka defeated Super Shenlong	25th Singles match in the 50 Match Super Shenlong Trial Series	2:19
4	Masato Yoshino and Dragon Kid defeated Ryo Saito and Mazada by disqualification	Tag team match	15:30
5	Naoki Tanizaki (c) defeated Kagetora and Akira Tozawa	Three-way match for the Open the Brave Gate Championship	11:17
6	Warriors-5 (Cima and Gamma) and Magnitude Kishiwada defeated Real Hazard (Genki Horiguchi and Yasushi Kanda and Dr. Muscle)	Six-man tag team match	13:28
7	Kamikaze (Shingo Takagi and Yamato) (c) and Zetsurins (Masaaki Mochizuki and Don Fujii) ended in a double knockout	Tag team match for the Open the Twin Gate Championship	25:12
8	Naruki Doi (c) defeated BxB Hulk	Singles match for the Open the Dream Gate Championship	27:02
(c) / – the champion(s) heading into the match; P / – the match was broadcast on the pre-show

== 2010 ==
No.	Results	Stipulations	Times
1^{P}	Super Shenlong defeated Kotoka and Shisa Boy	Three-way match	3:01
2	Warriors (Genki Horiguchi & Ryo Saito) and Nosawa Rongai defeated PoS.HEARTS (Anthony W. Mori, BxB Hulk and Super Shisa)	Six-man tag team match	7:53
3	Riki Choshu defeated "Hollywood" Stalker Ichikawa	Singles match	0:42
4	Kagetora defeated Kzy	Singles match	8:08
5	Pac (c) defeated Dragon Kid	Singles match for the Open the Brave Gate Championship	17:45
6	Gamma and Naruki Doi defeated Knesuka (K-ness and Susumu Yokosuka) (c)	Tag team match for the Open the Twin Gate Championship	23:14
7	Naoki Tanizaki, Takuya Sugawara and Yasushi Kanda (c) defeated Kamikaze (Cyber Kong, Shingo Takagi and Yamato) and Don Fujii, Kenichiro Arai and Masaaki Mochizuki	Three-way elimination tag team match for the Open the Triangle Gate Championship	27:06
8	Masato Yoshino (c) defeated Cima	Singles match for the Open the Dream Gate Championship	30:38
(c) / – the champion(s) heading into the match; P / – the match was broadcast on the pre-show

== 2011 ==
No.	Results	Stipulations	Times
1	K-ness, Kenichiro Arai and Taku Iwasa defeated Kotoka, Super Shenlong and Super Shisa	Six-man tag team match	8:15
2	Don Fujii, Stalker Ichikawa and Yoshihiro Takayama defeated Blood Warriors (Brodie Lee & Yasushi Kanda) and Metal Warrior	Six-man tag team match	10:58
3	Ryo Saito defeated Rich Swann	Singles match	7:05
4	Blood Warriors (Kzy, Naoki Tanizaki and Naruki Doi) (c) defeated Junction Three (Gamma, Masaaki Mochizuki and Susumu Yokosuka)	Six-man tag team match for the Open the Triangle Gate Championship	13:12
5	Pac (c) defeated Genki Horiguchi	Singles match for the Open the Brave Gate Championship	15:32
6	Spiked Mohicans (Cima and Ricochet) (c) defeated Junction Three (Dragon Kid and Masato Yoshino)	Tag team match for the Open the Twin Gate Championship	26:04
7	Akira Tozawa, BxB Hulk, Cyber Kong, Kagetora and Shingo Takagi defeated Yamato	Six-man mask vs. hair steel cage match (Note: Yamato was the last of the six men to climb the cage and grab one of the five flags and subsequently got his head shaved.)	40:44
(c) / – the champion(s) heading into the match

== 2012 ==
No.	Results	Stipulations	Times
1	A. R. Fox, Super Shisa and Shachihoko Boy defeated Jimmy Kagetora, Kotoka and Super Shenlong	Six-man tag team match	7:04
2	Kenichiro Arai (c) defeated Stalker Ichikawa	Singles match for the Open the Owarai Gate Championship	7:49
3	Jimmyz (Genki Horiguchi HAGeeMee, Mr. Kyu Kyu Toyonaka Dolphin and Ryo Jimmy Saito) defeated Mad Blankey (Cyber Kong, Kzy and Mondai Ryu)	Six-man tag team match	9:14
4	Dragon Kid (c) defeated Eita	Singles match for the Open the Brave Gate Championship	15:23
5	Team Veteran Returns (Gamma and HUB) and Magnitude Kishiwada defeated Mad Blankey (Akira Tozawa, BxB Hulk and Naoki Tanisaki) (c)	Six-man tag team match for the Open the Triangle Gate Championship	12:24
6	Akatsuki (Shingo Takagi and Yamato) defeated WORLD-1 International (Johnny Gargano and Naruki Doi)	Tag team match	23:15
7	Team Veteran Returns (Don Fujii and Masaaki Mochizuki) (c) defeated Jimmyz (Jimmy Kanda and Jimmy Susumu)	Tag team match for the Open the Twin Gate Championship	20:33
8	Cima (c) defeated Masato Yoshino	Singles match for the Open the Dream Gate Championship	27:02
(c) / – the champion(s) heading into the match

== 2013 ==
No.	Results	Stipulations	Times
1	Jimmyz (Jimmy Kanda, Jimmy Susumu and Ryo Jimmy Saito) defeated Ryotsu Shimizu, Super Shisa and Shachihoko Boy	Six-man tag team match	9:10
2	Jimmyz (Jimmy Kagetora and Mr. Kyu Kyu Naoki Tanizaki Toyonaka Dolphin) defeated We Are Team Veteran (Don Fujii and Gamma) and Mad Blankey (Kzy and Mondai Ryu)	Three-way elimination tag team match	8:59
3	Ciba, Tsubasa and We Are Team Veteran (Cima and Masaaki Mochizuki) defeated Millennials (Flamita, Rocky Lobo, U-T and Yosuke Santa Maria)	Eight-man tag team match	12:00
4	Genki Horiguchi HAGeeMee (c) defeated Anthony Nese	Singles match for the Open the Brave Gate Championship	12:35
5	Millennials (Eita and T-Hawk) defeated We Are Team Veteran (Dragon Kid and K-ness) (c)	Tag team match for the Open the Twin Gate Championship	20:21
6	Mad Blankey (BxB Hulk, Cyber Kong and Yamato) (c) defeated Monster Express (Akira Tozawa, Shingo Takagi and Uhaa Nation)	Six-man tag team match for the Open the Triangle Gate Championship	24:05
7	Masato Yoshino (c) defeated Naruki Doi	Singles match for the Open the Dream Gate Championship	28:58
(c) / – the champion(s) heading into the match

== 2014 ==
No.	Results	Stipulations	Times
1	Kotoka, Yosuke Santa Maria and Yuga Hayashi defeated We Are Team Veteran (Don Fujii, Stalker Ichikawa and Super Shisa)	Six-man tag team match	6:40
2	Jimmyz (Jimmy Kagetora and Mr. Kyu Kyu Naoki Tanizaki Toyonaka Dolphin) defeated Mad Blankey (Mondai Ryu and Punch Tominaga)	Tag team match	6:08
3	Flamita (c) defeated Jimmy Kanda	Singles match for the Open the Brave Gate Championship	12:42
4	Monster Express (Masato Yoshino, Shingo Takagi and Shachihoko Boy) defeated Dia.HEARTS (Big R Shimizu, Dragon Kid and Masaaki Mochizuki)	Six-man tag team match	15:25
5	Jimmyz (Genki Horiguchi HAGeeMee, Jimmy Susumu and Ryo Jimmy Saito) (c) defeated Mad Blankey (Cyber Kong, Naruki Doi and Yamato)	Six-man tag team match for the Open the Triangle Gate Championship	24:02
6	Osaka06 (Cima and Gamma) defeated Millennials (Eita and T-Hawk) (c)	Tag team match for the Open the Twin Gate Championship	22:04
7	BxB Hulk (c) defeated Akira Tozawa	Singles match for the Open the Dream Gate Championship	26:06
(c) / – the champion(s) heading into the match

== 2015 ==
No.	Results	Stipulations	Times
1	Super Shisa and Shachihoko Boy defeated U-T and Yosuke Santa Maria	Tag team match	6:36
2	Over Generation (Eita, El Lindaman and Kaito Ishida) defeated Dia.HEARTS (Big R Shimizu and Kzy) and Drastik Boy	Six-man tag team match	6:11
3	VerserK (Cyber Kong and Mondai Ryu) defeated Over Generation (Punch Tominaga and Takehiro Yamamura)	Tag team match	6:41
4	Dia.HEARTS (Dragon Kid and Flamita) defeated Jimmyz (Genki Horiguchi HAGeeMee and Jimmy Kanda)	Tag team match	8:07
5	Kotoka defeated Akira Tozawa (c) and Naoki Tanizaki	Three-way match for the Open the Brave Gate Championship	18:05
6	Over Generation (Cima and Gamma) and Don Fujii (c) defeated Jimmyz (Jimmy K-ness JKS, Jimmy Susumu and Ryo Jimmy Saito)	Six-man tag team match for the Open the Triangle Gate Championship	17:52
7	VerserK (Naruki Doi and Yamato) (c) defeated Monster Express (Masato Yoshino and T-Hawk)	Tag team match for the Open the Twin Gate Championship	21:48
8	Shingo Takagi (c) defeated Masaaki Mochizuki	Singles match for the Open the Dream Gate Championship	24:55
(c) / – the champion(s) heading into the match

== 2016 ==
No.	Results	Stipulations	Times
1	Shun Watanabe, Hyo Watanabe and Futa Nakamura defeated Over Generation (Punch Tominaga, Kaito Ishida and Takehiro Yamamura)	Six-man tag team match	6:16
2	Tribe Vanguard (Kzy and Yosuke Santa Maria) defeated Shachihoko Boy and Stalker Ichikawa	Tag team match	5:20
3	VerserK (El Lindaman and Mondai Ryu) defeated Don Fujii and Gamma	Tag team match	9:57
4	Eita (c) defeated Flamita	Singles match for the Open the Brave Gate Championship	14:48
5	Jimmyz (Genki Horiguchi H.A.Gee.Mee!!, Jimmy Kanda and Ryo "Jimmy" Saito) (c) defeated VerserK (T-Hawk, Cyber Kong and "brother" Yasshi) and Masaaki Mochizuki, Big R Shimizu and Peter Kaasa	Three-way elimination match for the Open the Triangle Gate Championship	21:27
6	Over Generation (Cima and Dragon Kid) defeated Jimmyz (Jimmy Susumu and Jimmy Kagetora) (c)	Tag team match for the Open the Twin Gate Championship	21:36
7	Shingo Takagi, YAMATO and BxB Hulk defeated Akira Tozawa, Masato Yoshino and Naruki Doi	Six-man tag team match	27:49
(c) / – the champion(s) heading into the match

== 2017 ==
No.	Results	Stipulations	Times
1	Shun Skywalker defeated Hyo Watanabe	Dark match	6:11
2	K-ness, Misterioso Jr., Shachihoko Boy and Yosuke Santa Maria defeated Over Generation (Gamma, Kaito Ishida & Mondai Ryu) and Jason Lee	Eight-man tag team match	7:47
3	VerserK (Punch Tominaga, T-Hawk and Yasushi Kanda) defeated Don Fujii, Ryo Saito and U-T	Six-man tag team match	9:52
4	Kagetora (c) defeated Genki Horiguchi	Singles match for the Open the Brave Gate Championship	10:26
5	Ricochet defeated Eita	Singles match	15:41
6	Over Generation (Cima and Dragon Kid) (c) defeated MaxiMuM (Ben-K and Big R Shimizu)	Tag team match for the Open the Twin Gate Championship	17:30
7	Tribe Vanguard (BxB Hulk, Kzy and Yamato) defeated VerserK (El Lindaman, Shingo Takagi and Takashi Yoshida) (c) and MaxiMuM (Kotoka, Masato Yoshino and Naruki Doi)	Three-way elimination match for the Open the Triangle Gate Championship	24:08
8	Masaaki Mochizuki (c) defeated Susumu Yokosuka	Singles match for the Open the Dream Gate Championship	23:40
(c) / – the champion(s) heading into the match

== 2018 ==
No.	Results	Stipulations	Times
1	K-ness and Mondai Ryu defeated Shachihoko Boy and Stalker Ichikawa	Dark Tag team match	3:59
2	Don Fujii, Gamma and Ryo Saito defeated Natural Vibes (Punch Tominaga and "brother" Yasshi) and H.Y.O	Six-man tag team match	8:30
3	Daga and R.E.D. (Eita, Kazma Sakamoto and Yasushi Kanda) defeated Tribe Vanguard (Kagetora, U-T, Yosuke Santa Maria) and Kota Minoura	Eight-man tag team match	8:22
4	Natural Vibes (Genki Horiguchi, Kzy and Susumu Yokosuka) (c) defeated MaxiMuM (Jason Lee, Kaito Ishida and Naruki Doi) and Mochizuki Dojo (Masaaki Mochizuki, Shun Skywalker and Yuki Yoshioka)	Three-way elimination tag team match for the Open the Triangle Gate Championship	18:58
5	Pac defeated Flamita	Singles match	17:45
6	Dragon Kid (c) defeated Bandido	Singles match for the Open the Brave Gate Championship	11:17
7	Tribe Vanguard (BxB Hulk and Yamato) (c) defeated R.E.D. (Big R Shimizu and Takashi Yoshida)	Tag team match for the Open the Twin Gate Championship	14:12
8	Masato Yoshino (c) defeated Ben-K	Singles match for the Open the Dream Gate Championship	25:07
(c) / – the champion(s) heading into the match

== 2019 ==
No.	Results	Stipulations	Times
1	Mochizuki Dojo (Keisuke Okuda, Kota Minoura and Yuki Yoshioka) defeated Tribe Vanguard (BxB Hulk, Kai and Yosuke Santa Maria)	Six-man tag team match	7:57
2	Dragon Dia defeated Ho Ho Lun, Jimmy, Kagetora, Kanjyuro Matsuyama, Mondai Ryu, Oji Shiiba, Punch Tominaga, Stalker Ichikawa and Shachihoko Boy	Ten-man battle royal	7:35
3	Kzy and Yamato defeated Mochizuki Dojo (Masaaki Mochizuki and Shun Skywalker)	Tag team match	13:28
4	R.E.D. (H.Y.O, Kazma Sakamoto and Takashi Yoshida and Diamante) vs. Genki Horiguchi, K-ness, Super Shisa and Último Dragón ended in a double count-out	Eight-man tag team match	14:00
5	Kaito Ishida defeated Susumu Yokosuka (c)	Singles match for the Open the Brave Gate Championship	17:47
6	Strong Machine F, Strong Machine G and Strong Machine J (with KY Wakamatsu) (c) defeated MaxiMuM (Dragon Kid, Jason Lee and Naruki Doi)	Six-man tag team match for the Open the Triangle Gate Championship	12:08
7	R.E.D. (Big R Shimizu and Eita) (c) defeated Ryo Saito and Yasushi Kanda	Tag team match for the Open the Twin Gate Championship	12:29
8	Ben-K (c) defeated Masato Yoshino	Singles match for the Open the Dream Gate Championship	21:45
(c) / – the champion(s) heading into the match

== 2020 ==
No.	Results	Stipulations	Times
1	Jimmy, Mondai Ryu, U-T and Yosuke Santa Maria defeated K-ness, Shachihoko Boy, Konomama Ichikawa and Ho Ho Lun	Eight-man tag team match	3:36
2	Team Dragon Gate (Ben-K, Dragon Dia and Strong Machine J) defeated R.E.D (BxB Hulk, Dia Inferno and H.Y.O)	Six-man tag team match	9:18
3	Team Toryumon (Dragon Kid, Kagetora, Ryo Saito and Shuji Kondo) defeated Don Fujii, Gamma, Masaaki Mochizuki and The Bodyguard	Eight-man tag team match	9:58
4	Kento Kobune, Madoka Kikuta and Taketo Kamei defeated Team Toryumon (Masato Yoshino, Último Dragón and Yasushi Kanda)	Six-man tag team match	9:24
5	Yamato defeated Kai by disqualification	Singles match	7:08
6	Keisuke Okuda defeated Kaito Ishida (c)	Singles match for the Open the Brave Gate Championship	10:48
7	Team Dragon Gate (Jason Lee and Kota Minoura) (c) defeated Team Toryumon (Genki Horiguchi and Susumu Yokosuka)	Tag team match for the Open the Twin Gate Championship	11:58
8	R.E.D (Kazma Sakamoto, Kento Kobune and Takashi Yoshida) defeated Team Boku (Naruki Doi, Punch Tominaga and Ryotsu Shimizu)	Six-man tag team match for the vacant Open the Triangle Gate Championship	12:57
9	Eita (c) defeated Kzy	Singles match for the Open the Dream Gate Championship	20:52
(c) / – the champion(s) heading into the match

== 2021 ==
No.	Results	Stipulations	Times
1	Naruki Doi, Takashi Yoshida, Don Fujii and Gamma defeated Natural Vibes (Kzy, Genki Horiguchi, Jacky "Funky" Kamei and U-T)	Eight-man tag team match	7:59
2	Jason Lee defeated Ho Ho Lun, Yosuke Santa Maria, Strong Machine J, Mondai Ryu, Super Shisa, Punch Tominaga, Konomama Ichikawa and Shachihoko Boy	Nine-person battle royal	7:08
3	Masaaki Mochizuki, Yasushi Kanda and Takumi Hayakawa defeated Último Dragón and Iihashi Brothers (Riki Iihashi and Ishin Iihashi)	Six-man tag team match	10:42
4	MASQUERADE (Shun Skywalker, Kota Minoura, Dragon Dia and La Estrella) defeated R.E.D (Kai, Diamante, SB Kento and Dia Inferno) by disqualification	Eight-man tag team match	10:04
5	R.E.D (Eita, Kaito Ishida and H.Y.O) (c) defeated High-End (Ben-K, Dragon Kid and Kagetora)	Six-man tag team match for the Open the Triangle Gate Championship	11:09
6	Natural Vibes (King Shimizu and Susumu Yokosuka) (c) defeated Kongo (Kenoh and Haoh)	Tag team match for the Open the Twin Gate Championship	14:00
7	Yamato (c) defeated BxB Hulk	Singles match for the Open the Dream Gate Championship	19:36
(c) / – the champion(s) heading into the match

== 2022 ==
No.	Results	Stipulations	Times
1	Natural Vibes (Kzy, Jason Lee, Jacky "Funky" Kamei and U-T) defeated Naruki Doi, Último Dragón, Don Fujii and Shuji Kondo	Eight-man tag team match	9:32
2	Yasushi Kanda and Ishin Iihashi defeated Genki Horiguchi and Kaito Nagano	Tag team match	3:43
3	Takashi Yoshida, Yosuke Santa Maria, Ho Ho Lun and Punch Tominaga defeated Gurukun Mask, Konomama Ichikawa, Shachihoko Boy and Mondai Ryu	Eight-man tag team match	2:26
4	Z-Brats (BxB Hulk and Diamante) defeated Gold Class (Kota Minoura, Ben-K and Minorita)	Handicap match	8:03
5	Eita defeated Takuma Fujiwara	Singles match	9:52
6	D'courage (Dragon Dia and Madoka Kikuta) (c) defeated Natural Vibes (Big Boss Shimizu and Strong Machine J)	Tag team match for the Open the Twin Gate Championship	12:02
7	H.Y.O (c) defeated Dragon Kid	Singles match for the Open the Brave Gate Championship	12:54
8	Z-Brats (Kai, Shun Skywalker and Masked Z) defeated M3K (Masaaki Mochizuki, Susumu Mochizuki and Mochizuki Jr.) (c)	Six-man tag team match for the Open the Triangle Gate Championship	12:26
9	Yuki Yoshioka (c) defeated Yamato	Singles match for the Open the Dream Gate Championship	23:08
(c) / – the champion(s) heading into the match

== 2023 ==
No.	Results	Stipulations	Times
1	Gold Class (Ben-K, BxB Hulk & Kota Minoura) defeated Genki Horiguchi, Kagetora and Mondai Ryu	Six-man tag team match	4:23
2	Ishin (c) defeated Ryoya Tanaka	Singles match for the Open the Brave Gate Championship	9:43
3	Z-Brats (H.Y.O, Kai & Shun Skywalker) defeated M3K (Masaaki Mochizuki & Mochizuki Jr.) and Yoshiki Kato	Six-man tag team match	7:07
4	Eita, Luis Mante, Naruki Doi, Shuji Kondo and Último Dragón defeated Natural Vibes (Jacky "Funky" Kamei, Jason Lee, Kzy, Strong Machine J & U-T)	Ten-man tag team match	10:21
5	Dragon Kid, Punch Tominaga and Yamato (c) defeated Don Fujii, Takashi Yoshida and The Bodyguard	Six-man tag team match for the Open the Triangle Gate Championship	14:03
6	D'courage (Dragon Dia & Yuki Yoshioka) defeated M3K (Susumu Mochizuki & Yasushi Kanda) (c)	Tag team match for the Open the Twin Gate Championship	21:29
7	Madoka Kikuta (c) defeated Big Boss Shimizu	Singles match for the Open the Dream Gate Championship	25:35
(c) / – the champion(s) heading into the match

== 2024 ==
No.	Results	Stipulations	Times
1	Paradox (Kagetora & Susumu Yokosuka) defeated Madoka Kikuta and Ryu Fuda	Tag team match	3:46
2	Kateika Dragon, Mondai Ryu, Takashi Yoshida and Último Dragón defeated Don Fujii, Genki Horiguchi, Masaaki Mochizuki and Toru Owashi	Eight Man Tag Team match	7:00
3	Natural Vibes (Big Boss Shimizu, Strong Machine J & U-T) (c) defeated Z-Brats (Homare & KAI) and Demus	Six-man tag team match for the Open the Triangle Gate Championship	11:36
4	Dump Matsumoto defeated Kono Mama Ichikawa	Bosou 10 Match Series Revival Match #6	2:49
5	Darkside Hulk vs. Shun Skywalker ended in a Double Count Out	No Disqualification match	8:05
6	Dragon Dia (c) defeated Ryoya Tanaka	Singles match for the Open the Brave Gate Championship	13:35
7	Natural Vibes (Flamita & Kzy) defeated Paradox (Dragon Kid & Naruki Doi) (c)	Tag team match for the Open the Twin Gate Championship	14:05
8	Gold Class (Ben-K, Mochizuki Jr. & Riiita) defeated Z-Brats (ISHIN, Jason Lee & Kota Minoura) and Big Hug (Hyo, Jacky Kamei & Luis Mante)	Losing Unit Must Disband Three Way Elimination Match	15:52
9	YAMATO (c) defeated Kenoh	Singles match for the Open the Dream Gate Championship	21:41
(c) / – the champion(s) heading into the match
