= Kouji Shishido =

Japanese wrestler (born 1972)

Personal information
- Born: February 2, 1972 (age 54) Fukushima-shi, Fukushima, Japan

Professional wrestling career
- Ring name(s): Kouji Shishido; Oyaji; Jackson Florida
- Billed height: 1.70 m (5 ft 7 in)
- Billed weight: 70 kg (150 lb)
- Trained by: Dragon Gate Dojo
- Debut: October 20, 2006

Kouji Shishido (宍戸 幸之, Shishido Kōji; born February 2, 1972) is a Japanese professional wrestler who competes for Dragon Gate.

== Professional wrestling career ==
=== Dragon Gate (2006-present) ===
He plays the Jackson Florida character, who is a popular masked comedy wrestler in the promotion. He debuted the character on July 3, 2005, in a tag match where he and Johnson Florida battled the Florida Brothers, Michael Iwasa and Daniel Mishima. His character is the uncle of the Florida Brothers, and he has earned the nickname "The Stuntman" because of his high-risk wrestling style. His risk taking is always unsuccessful, however, which provides much of the character's comedy. In particular, he has missed his diving knee drop so many times that he requires the use of a cane to walk and wrestle, and what's worse, he refuses to stop using the move. Despite this, he has managed to become a three-time Open the Owarai Gate Champion. As the Owarai Gate Championship is decided based on fan support rather than actually winning matches, his poor win-loss record doesn't prevent him from being a staple of the division.

He competed for the Tozawa-juku stable under his real name, joining in 2006 as their flag bearer. However, he was used sporadically during his whole tenure, and spent a lot of time injured. When the unit was brought to an end on November 16, 2008, after his stablemates Akira Tozawa, Taku Iwasa and Kenichiro Arai lost a match to Open the Triangle Gate champions Masaaki Mochizuki, Don Fujii and Magnitude Kishiwada, he and his stablemates were given a graduation ceremony. He competed solely on the Jackson Florida character until his departure from the company at the end of 2011.

== Championships and accomplishments ==
- Dragon Gate

- Dragon Gate Open the Owarai Gate Championship (3 times)
