= Takayuki Yagi =

Japanese wrestler (born 1975)

Personal information
- Born: March 20, 1975 (age 51) Asahi, Chiba, Japan

Professional wrestling career
- Ring name(s): Takayuki Yagi; Johnson Florida; Pescatore Yagi; Bakery Yagi
- Billed height: 1.70 m (5 ft 7 in)
- Billed weight: 80 kg (180 lb)
- Trained by: Dragon Gate Dojo; Último Dragón; Skayde
- Debut: January 19, 2001

Takayuki Yagi (八木 隆行, Yagi Takayuki; born March 20, 1975) is a Japanese professional wrestling referee and former professional wrestler who works for the Japanese professional wrestling promotion Dragon Gate.

== Biography ==
=== Wrestler ===
Yagi joined the Toryumon system as a part of the T2P class. He started his career under his real name, and his initial gimmick was that of a fisherman who carried a large flag with a sea-oriented design to the ring. Following the formation of the Italian Connection on March 3, 2002, he was accepted into the unit and renamed Pescatore Yagi, "pescatore" being the Italian word for fisherman, and he began carrying a large Italian flag to the ring instead.

When the ItaCon admitted on January 23, 2003 that they were all indeed Japanese and not Italian, Yagi admitted that he was not a fisherman, but instead the son of a baker. Stable leader Milano Collection A.T. then (kayfabe) banished him to his father's bakery to learn the family trade.

He would make his return as Bakery Yagi, costing Crazy MAX a match against the Italian Connection by whacking SUWA in the knee with a baguette. At this point, the Italian Connection was full of internal strife as to whether the stable was to be face or heel. As Bakery, he came down on the heel side. He began carrying loaves of bread to the ring, and using them as weapons in matches. When the ItaCon split, Yagi sided with the heels.

Yagi's in-ring career would end as part of the unnamed ItaCon breakaway faction. He, group leader Shuji Kondo, and brother YASSHI were in the ring when Kondo ordered him to the back to get some bread he baked. While he was backstage, Toru Owashi entered the ring. He made the statement that "sumos don't eat bread", and the three men attacked Yagi, shoving his bread down his throat.

=== Referee ===
Yagi returned to Dragon Gate, but as a referee rather than a wrestler. It is presumed that he stepped down because of injury.

His first role as a referee was that of a face referee who was continually bothered by the antics of the Florida Brothers. He would eventually join the Floridas, however, as a partial referee. He wore an American flag motif shirt instead of a referee's jersey, and wore oversized celebrity sunglasses, without which he couldn't see.

He also performed with the Floridas as the masked Johnson Florida. Even though the Floridas Brothers have ended, he still performs as Johnson on occasion. He and Jackson Florida make up the Florida Express.

When the Florida Bros ended, Yagi returned to being the face referee. On a few occasions, he attacked Kinta Tamaoka, the partial heel referee for the Muscle Outlaw'z.

== Championships and accomplishments ==
- Dragon Gate
  - Open the Owarai Gate Championship (1 time)
