= Kinta Tamaoka =

Japanese professional wrestler

Kinta Tomoaka
Personal information
- Born: Kinta Tomoaka

Professional wrestling career
- Ring name: Kinta Tomoaka
- Billed height: 1.69 m (5 ft 7 in)
- Billed weight: 77 kg (170 lb)
- Trained by: Último Dragón
- Debut: March 11, 2001

Koichi Tamaoka (玉岡 孝一, Tamaoka Kōichi; born August 17, 1977) is a Japanese professional wrestling referee and semi-retired professional wrestler, best known for working for Dragon Gate under the ring name Kinta Tamaoka (玉岡 金太, Tamaoka Kinta).

== Professional wrestling career ==
=== Japanese independent scene (2001–present) ===
Tamaoka joined the Toryumon system as a wrestler, but dropped out of the dojo for unknown reasons. He then became a referee.

In May 2006, he joined heel unit Muscle Outlaw'z to act as their own personal referee. He used fast counts and allowed rule breaking to give them an advantage. He also would simply refuse to count for MO'z opponents, and occasionally go so far as to attack them. A particular trick of his was to throw "protein" in the opponents' faces.

Come September 2007, Tamaoka's relationship with the MO'z began to disintegrate after he cost the MO'z several matches with misaimed protein attacks. He was challenged to a banishment match by Gamma on September 22. The MO'z surprisingly aided Tamaoka against Gamma, causing Gamma's brief departure from the federation. However, Gamma returned to Dragon Gate and MO'z a month later, and Tamaoka was mobbed and kicked out of the unit upon doing so.

After his exile from MO'z, Tamaoka briefly had an active schedule as a wrestler, but he stopped wrestling abruptly and returned to refereeing. As of May 2008, his profile was placed under the regular referee section on the Official Dragon Gate website. He continues to referee, but no longer plays a role or shows a distinct personality.

On March 20, 2009, Tamaoka won the Open the Owarai Gate Championship from "Hollywood" Stalker Ichikawa. The title match was actually between Stalker and Masaaki Mochizuki, but Tamaoka won more fan support than either of them, so he became champion. He then vacated the title immediately afterwards since he wasn't a full-time wrestler.

On April 5, 2011, Dragon Gate announced that they had fired Tamaoka, when it was learned that the night before he had been arrested for public drug use in a Kobe area restroom. The drug in question has been identified for now as simply a stimulant. The company had initially announced that he had been in violation of his contract when they announced his firing and the real reason had not been revealed until April 22 when the story received some mainstream press. As of that date, he was still in police custody.

== Championships and accomplishments ==
- Dragon Gate

- Dragon Gate Open the Owarai Gate Championship (1 time)
