= Genki Horiguchi =

Japanese professional wrestler (born 1978)

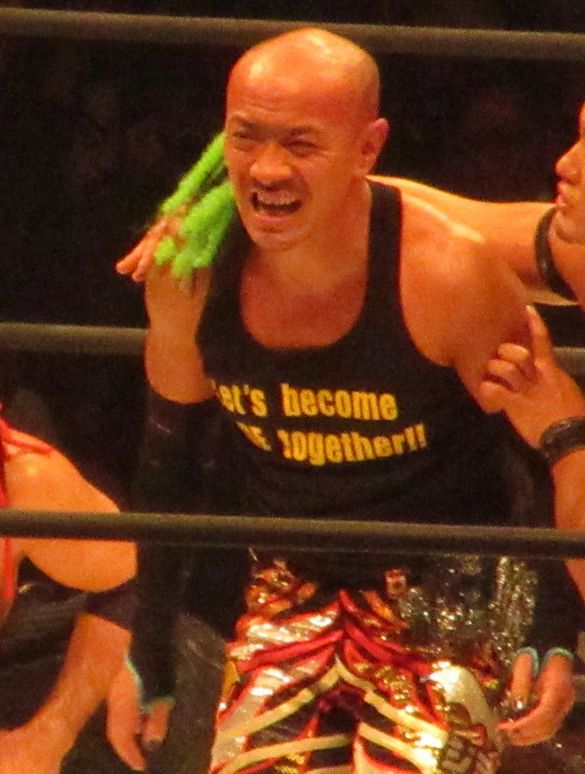
- Horiguchi in 2016

Personal information
- Born: Hiromasa Horiguchi; September 15, 1978 (age 48) Kumamoto, Japan

Professional wrestling career
- Ring name(s): Genki Horiguchi; H.A.G.E. Horiguchi; Genki Horiguchi H.A.Gee.Mee!! Genki Horiguchi S.U.M.O
- Billed height: 1.73 m (5 ft 8 in)
- Billed weight: 75 kg (165 lb)
- Trained by: Último Dragón; Dos Caras
- Debut: October 17, 1998

Hiromasa Horiguchi (堀口博正, Horiguchi Hiromasa; born September 15, 1978) is a Japanese professional wrestler, better known by the ring name Genki Horiguchi (堀口元気, Horiguchi Genki). He is currently a full-time wrestler for Dragon Gate. He has also competed in Wrestling Society X and Ring of Honor.

When Horiguchi's hairline began receding, the fans began to chant H-A-G-E (hage (禿) being Japanese for "baldness") at him. He managed to use this to gain a sort of cult popularity, and his catchphrase, "Who has called me hage?", is one of the best known in Japan.

Hiromi Horiguchi, a wrestler currently working for Toryumon Mexico, was thought for some time to be Genki's brother, but the relationship was only a gimmick.

== Career ==
=== Toryumon ===
Horiguchi debuted in Toryumon as a face wrestler with a surfer gimmick. In 2001, he began to lose his hair, and in November he turned heel, cast away his surfer gimmick, and he joined the original M2K as a replacement for Chocoflake K-ICHI. He was the last wrestler to be added to the group.

During his days in the M2K stable, he held the NWA World Welterweight Title twice, defeating Ryo Saito to win it, vacating the title after a no-contest match with Dragon Kid, defeating Ricky Marvin to win it again, and finally losing it to M2K stablemate Darkness Dragon. As part of Do FIXER, he won the UWA World Trios Titles with Susumu Yokosuka and Ryo Saito.

He was responsible for bringing in Magnum TOKYO to lead the remnants of M2K after the name was sealed. In 2002, he would team with Magnum TOKYO and Darkness Dragon in a three-way trios tag team match against Ryo Saito, Masaaki Mochizuki & Dragon Kid and CIMA, Don Fujii & Yoshikazu Taru and was pinned by CIMA.

In Spring 2003, he scored a series of upset wins, most of them via backslide. This led to the rise of his finisher, the Backslide from Heaven.

=== Dragon Gate ===
While in Do FIXER, he formed a friendship with Ryo Saito that would endure for several years. He teamed with Saito to defeat The Florida Brothers at the 2004 Revolucion ppv event on January 31, 2004. He, Saito and Dragon Kid would win the Open the Triangle Gate Championship three times while teaming together in Do FIXER. The three of them would travel to Ring of Honor to take part in a match against Blood Generation's CIMA, Naruki Doi & Masato Yoshino.

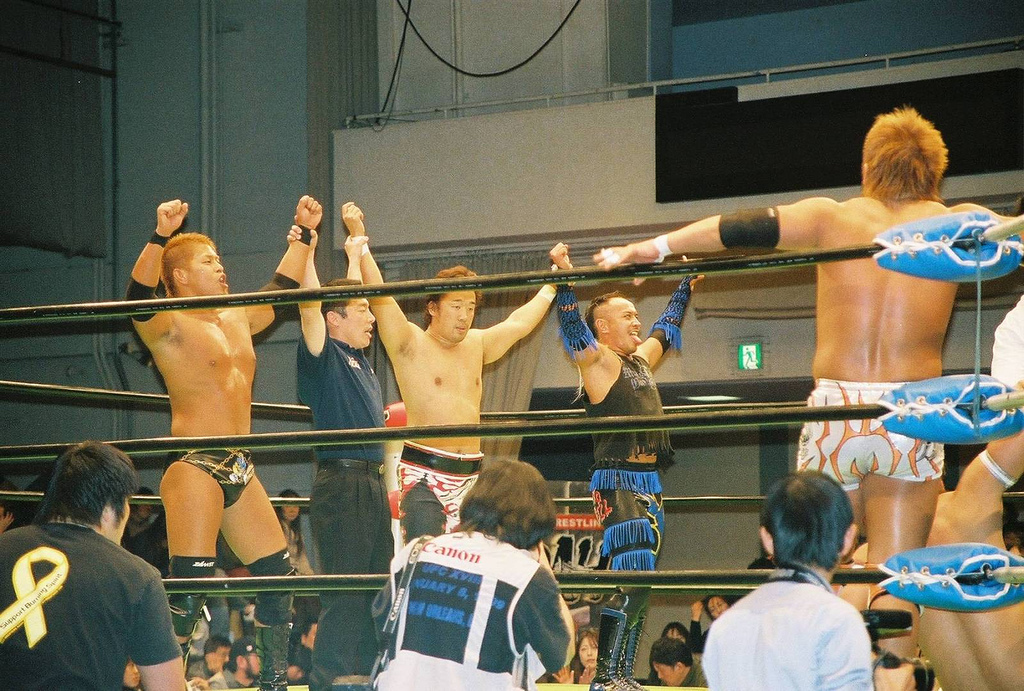
Horiguchi (far right) with Naruki Doi (far left) and Yoshinobu Kanemaru (second from the right) in July 2007.

In January 2007, he betrayed Saito and Do FIXER to join heel stable Muscle Outlaw'z. He underwent a radical transformation in appearance, and added blue mist to his arsenal. This turn lead him to an Open the Brave Gate title run, and a pinfall victory over CIMA in an 8-man elimination match (incidentally not his first direct win over CIMA). He feuded with gaijin Matt Sydal over the title before dropping it to Yasushi Kanda. After dropping the title, his push was not maintained. He began wrestling mainly early on the cards, taking the falls in multi-person matches, and was winless during all of March 2008. He began to develop kleptomania, stealing Tozawa-juku's pants and Anthony W. Mori's ring costume.

During the unit turmoil in the early parts of 2008, Horiguchi remained firmly on the heel side of Muscle Outlaw'z, and followed them to Real Hazard. He acted as secretary to the Brave Gate belt commissioner Yoshito Sugamoto, which was actually the Brave Gate champion (and his fellow MO'z stablemate) Gamma himself, enforcing the outrageous rules randomly put in place by him that allowed Gamma to win title matches or retain his title if he lost the match.

On July 27, 2008, Horiguchi defeated m.c.KZ to win the vacant Open the Brave Gate title for a second time. Despite the title win, his push was not increased, as he did not score any wins over any wrestler in higher standing than he had been previously. He defended it twice before losing it to Masato Yoshino on October 12, and then went right back to taking the falls in most multi-person matches for the remainder of 2008 and into 2009.

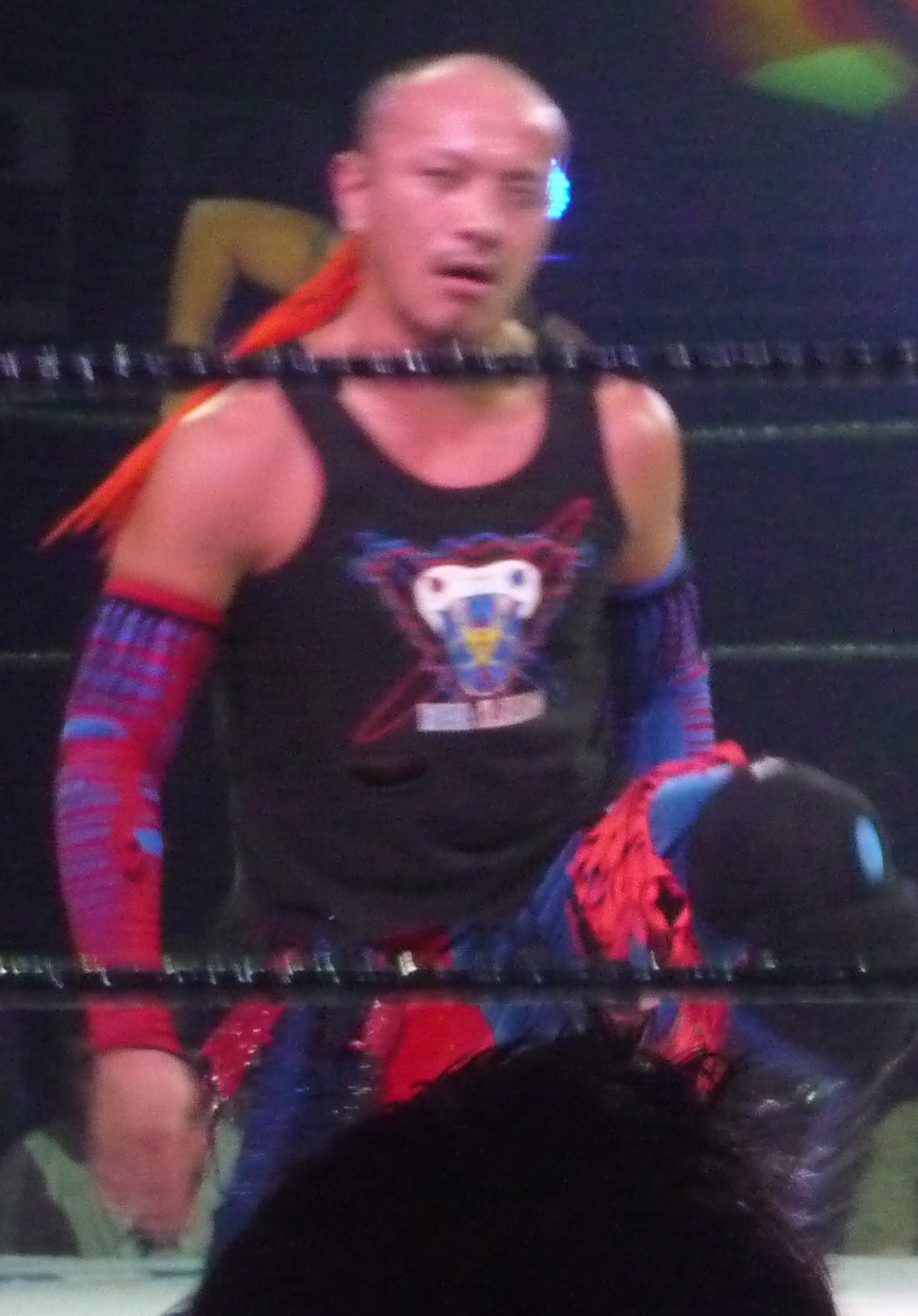
Horiguchi in 2009

When Ryo Saito turned heel in February 2009 and joined Real Hazard, he and Horiguchi began teaming again. On May 5, they won the Open the Twin Gate Championship from Susumu Yokosuka & Gamma in a Three-Way Match, which included fellow Real Hazard stablemates Kenichiro Arai & Yasushi Kanda. They would hold them until September 17, when they lost them to Shingo Takagi & YAMATO. Afterwards, Horiguchi was relatively quiet again. He unsuccessfully challenged Naoki Tanizaki in the fall of 2009 for the Open the Brave Gate Championship.

On January 10, 2010, Horiguchi put out a blog where he stated that Real Hazard would win more matches via teamwork instead of illegal tactics and weapons play in 2010. He would prove to be a man of his word that day when he stopped Yasushi Kanda from using a blue box in a tag team match they had. Though they still won, his actions caused him and Kanda to begin bickering. The bickering intensified the following day, when Kanda made him lose a tag team match by accidentally hitting him. Five days later, Horiguchi would be backed up by Susumu Yokosuka and K-ness in his quest for clean matches, after they all refused help from Kanda in a six-man tag match they were involved in. However, the new clean fight trio suddenly found themselves winless in every match they were in, with Horiguchi taking the fall every time. Also, their mission caused a divide to slowly form in Real Hazard, with them on one side and Kanda, Kzy, and Takuya Sugawara on the other. (Kenichiro Arai and KAGETORA remained neutral).

Tensions finally boiled over on February 10, after KAGETORA accidentally cost Sugawara a shot at becoming the next challenger for the Open the Dream Gate Title. Horiguchi left Real Hazard, along with Susumu and K-ness, and was put in a match against Sugawara, scheduled for March 3. However, K-neSuka and Horiguchi decided to not team together anymore, since they all did not like how he was losing constantly, and they all agreed that this was preventing K-neSuka from getting to the top of the tag team division. Genki remained a lone wolf up until the 27th, when Dragon Kid suggested him to CIMA and Gamma as a new member of the WARRIORS stable, and he was welcomed into the fold. On May 13, 2010, Horiguchi, CIMA and Gamma defeated Don Fujii, Masaaki Mochizuki and Akebono to win the Open the Triangle Gate Championship. On October 25, 2010, Horiguchi, CIMA and Gamma lost the Open the Triangle Gate Championship to Naoki Tanizaki, Yasushi Kanda and Takuya Sugawara.

Horiguchi turned heel on January 14, 2011, along with the rest of WARRIORS, when they attacked Masato Yoshino and WORLD-1, and joined forces with Naruki Doi's unnamed group. On January 18 the new group was named Blood Warriors. On February 6, 2011, Horiguchi and his Blood WARRIORS stablemate Ryo Saito defeated Don Fujii and Masaaki Mochizuki to win the Open the Twin Gate Championship. They would lose the title to rival group Junction Three representatives, Dragon Kid and PAC, on June 19, 2011. On February 9, 2012, new Blood Warriors leader Akira Tozawa kicked Horiguchi and Saito out of the group. On March 3, after Horiguchi teamed with Yasushi Kanda and Ryo Saito to win the vacant Open the Triangle Gate Championship, he renamed himself Genki Horiguchi H.A.Gee.Mee!! and formed the Jimmyz stable with Jimmy KAGETORA, Jimmy Kanda, Ryo "Jimmy" Saito and Jimmy Susumu. The Jimmyz lost the Open the Triangle Gate Championship to World-1 International (Masato Yoshino, Naruki Doi and Pac) on May 6. On May 19, Horiguchi defeated Akira Tozawa in the finals to win the 2012 King of Gate tournament. On September 29, 2013, Horiguchi defeated Kzy in the finals of a tournament to win the Open the Brave Gate Championship for the third time. He lost the title to Flamita on March 16, 2014.

=== Outside the Dragon System ===
Appearing in Aja Kong's "Yo! All the Members Set" 20th anniversary card, he teamed with Ryo Saito and Naoki Tanizaki against CIMA, Naruki Doi and Masato Yoshino at Korakuen Hall in Tokyo, Japan on August 21, 2005.

At the beginning of 2007, he was briefly affiliated with the Wrestling Society X company that was run by MTV. He and Masato Yoshino were a tag team known as Team Dragon Gate, despite the fact the two were in rival stables at the time; Horiguchi was still aligned with face stable Do FIXER while Yoshino was in heel stable Blood Generation. They would only win an exploding cage timebomb deathmatch in their time in this promotion.

== Championships and accomplishments ==
- All Japan Pro Wrestling
  - All Asia Tag Team Championship (1 time) – with Yasushi Kanda
- Dragon Gate

- Open the Brave Gate Championship (3 times)
- Open the Triangle Gate Championship (13 times) – with Dragon Kid and Ryo Saito (3), CIMA and GAMMA (2), Jimmy Kanda and Ryo "Jimmy" Saito (3), Mr. Kyu Kyu Toyonaka Dolphin and Ryo "Jimmy" Saito (1), Jimmy Susumu and Ryo "Jimmy" Saito (1), Jimmy Kagetora and Jimmy Susumu (1) and Kzy and Susumu Yokosuka (2)
- Open the Twin Gate Championship (2 times) – with Ryo Saito
- King of Gate (2012)
- Open the Brave Gate Championship Tournament (2013)

- Pro Wrestling Illustrated

- PWI ranked him #104 of the 500 best singles wrestlers of the PWI 500 in 2006

- Toryumon Mexico

- NWA World Welterweight Championship (2 times)
- UWA World Trios Championship (1 time) – with Susumu Yokosuka and Ryo Saito
- Young Dragons Cup (1998)

- Wrestling Observer Newsletter awards

- Match of the Year with Dragon Kid and Ryo Saito vs. CIMA, Naruki Doi and Masato Yoshino (ROH – Supercard of Honor – March 31)
