= Don Fujii =

Japanese professional wrestler

Personal information
- Born: Tatsuki Fuji; July 6, 1970 (age 56) Minoh-shi, Osaka, Japan

Professional wrestling career
- Ring name(s): Big Fuji; Don Fujii; Don Fujimmy; Karaoke Machine (#1); Sumo Dandy Fuji; Sumo Fujii
- Billed height: 1.75 m (5 ft 9 in)
- Billed weight: 100 kg (220 lb)
- Trained by: Último Dragón; Dos Caras; Animal Hamaguchi
- Debut: May 11, 1997

Rikinoumi Tatsuki
Personal information
- Native name: 力の湖 達樹 力の海 達樹
- Born: Tatsuki Fuji; 6 July 1970 (age 56) Minoh-shi, Osaka
- Height: 1.74 m (5 ft 8 1/2 in)
- Weight: 95.5 kg (211 lb)

Sport
- Sport: Sumo
- Retired: September, 1995
- Heya: Kitanoumi
- Record: 183-202
- Debut: July, 1986
- Highest rank: Sandanme 51 (May, 1990)
- Updated on Apr. 2026

Tatsuki Fuji (藤井 達樹, Fujii Tatsuki; born July 6, 1970), better known by his ring name Don Fujii (ドン・フジイ), is a Japanese professional wrestler and former sumo wrestler. He is signed to Dragongate, where he has wrestled for the majority of his 29-year career. As a sumo wrestler, he competed under the name Rikinoumi Tatsuki (stylized 力の湖 達樹 and 力の海 達樹); his highest rank was sandanme 51. He is a former Open the Dream Gate Champion, as well as of the former one-time AJPW All Asia Tag Team Champions with long-time partner Masaaki Mochizuki (as Mocchy-Fujii).

== Biography ==
He was one of the original graduates from the Toryumon dojo. He was also one of the founding members of the Crazy Max and Blood Generation stables. He made a few appearances in World Championship Wrestling as Sumo Fuji. He has wrestled as Karaoke Machine #1 at times as well. From 1999 until 2002, he changed his name annually. He first went from Sumo Fuji to Sumo "Dandy" Fuji, then to Sumo "Dandy" Fuji 2000, then to Big Fuji, and finally to Don Fujii.

Fujii has spent most of his Toryumon/Dragon Gate career in heel stables. He was a founding member of Crazy Max, as well as a founding member of Blood Generation. When Blood Generation ended in December 2006, Fujii signed on with Magnum Tokyo's Renaissance project. The project never went anywhere as Tokyo suffered a career-ending eye injury shortly after it started.

When Cima started the Typhoon stable, it caused the first split between Cima and Fujii, as Fujii did not want to align himself with Susumu Yokosuka and BxB Hulk. He is currently aligned with Masaaki Mochizuki and K-ness as part of a "seniors" unit. The three of them had an Open the Triangle Gate title run, but upon losing the belts, K-ness stepped back into a lower card role in the promotion while Fujii and Mochi have been focusing on representing Dragon Gate in other promotions. In 2008, the duo added Magnitude Kishiwada to their ranks, and the trio would eventually win the Open the Triangle Gate Titles from Yasushi Kanda, Yamato and Gamma on September 28. They held them until February 15, 2009, dropping them to Shingo Takagi, Taku Iwasa and Dragon Kid.

On April 12, he teamed with Kikutaro to beat Hollywood Stalker Ichikawa and Magnitude Kishiwada to become the inaugural Open the Owarai Twin Gate Champions. On October 14, he added the Triangle Gate titles to his collection, teaming with Masaaki Mochizuki and Akebono to defeat the champions Masato Yoshino, BxB Hulk and Pac. On May 13, 2010, Fujii, Mochizuki and Akebono lost the Open the Triangle Gate Championship to Cima, Gamma and Genki Horiguchi. On January 10, 2011, Fujii and Mochizuki defeated Naruki Doi and Gamma to win the Open the Twin Gate Championship. They would lose the title to Genki Horiguchi and Ryo Saito on February 6, 2011. On September 23, 2012, Fujii and Mochizuki, now representing the Kaettekita Veteran-gun stable, regained the title from Shingo Takagi and Yamato. They lost the title to BxB Hulk and Uhaa Nation on March 2, 2013. On June 14, 2015, he, Cima and Gamma defeated the Jimmyz (Ryo "Jimmy" Saito, Genki Horiguchi H.A.Gee.Mee!!, and Jimmy Susumu) to win the Open the Triangle Gate Championship. On October 8, Cima and Gamma formed a new unit called Over Generation with Eita, El Lindaman, Punch Tominaga, and rookies Takehiro Yamamura and Kaito Ishida. Don Fujii did not join the new unit despite holding the Open the Triangle Gate Championship with Cima and Gamma. On November 1, he, Cima, and Gamma defended the Open the Triangle Gate Championship against the Jimmyz (Jimmy Susumu, Jimmy K-Ness J.K.S., and Ryo "Jimmy" Saito), and vacated the titles afterwards.

== Championships and accomplishments ==
- All Japan Pro Wrestling
  - All Asia Tag Team Championship (1 time) – with Masaaki Mochizuki
- Dragon Gate
  - Open the Dream Gate Championship (1 time)
  - Open the Triangle Gate Championship (6 times) – with Cima and Naruki Doi (1), Masaaki Mochizuki and K-ness. (1), Masaaki Mochizuki and Magnitude Kishiwada (1), Masaaki Mochizuki and Akebono (1), and Cima and Gamma (2)
  - Open the Twin Gate Championship (2 times) – with Masaaki Mochizuki
  - Open the Owarai Gate Championship (1 time)
  - Open the Owarai Twin Gate Championship (1 time) – with Kikutaro
  - WAR International Junior Heavyweight Tag Team Championship (1 time) – with Masaaki Mochizuki
- International Wrestling Revolution Group
  - Copa Higher Power (1998) – with, Judo Suwa, Lyguila, Magnum Tokyo, Ryo Saito, Shiima Nobunaga and Último Dragón
- Osaka Pro Wrestling
  - Osaka Pro Wrestling Tag Team Championship (1 time) – with Masaaki Mochizuki
  - Osaka Tag Festival (2010) – Masaaki Mochizuki
- Tenryu Project
  - Tenryu Project World 6-Man Tag Team Championship (1 time) – with Kenichiro Arai and Yasshi
- Toryumon Japan
  - UWA World Trios Championship (4 times) – with Cima and Suwa (3) and Cima and Taru (1)
