= Stalker Ichikawa =

Japanese professional wrestler

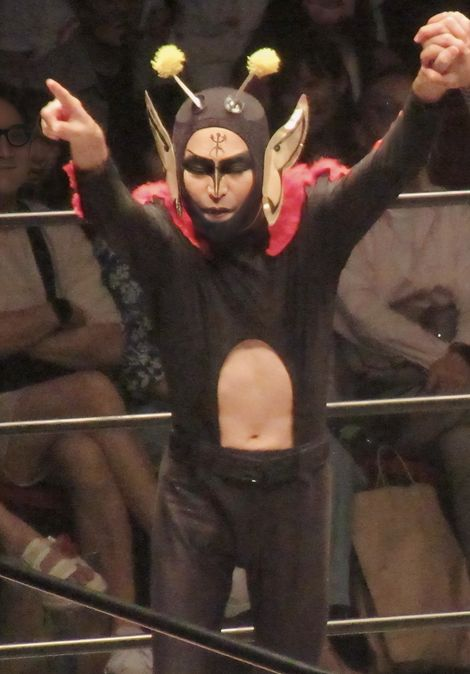
- Ichikawa in July 2024

Personal information
- Born: Kanji Ichikawa; October 12, 1974 (age 51) Kakamigahara, Gifu, Japan

Professional wrestling career
- Ring name(s): Ichikawa; Stalker Ichikawa; Konomama Ichikawa; Stalker Ichikawa Z Stan Ichikawa; Strong Machine Ichikawa; Tiger Jeet Ichikawa
- Billed height: 1.70 m (5 ft 7 in)
- Billed weight: 42 kg (93 lb)
- Billed from: Tokyo Fuji Television Network
- Trained by: Último Dragón; Dos Caras
- Debut: December 12, 1998
- Retired: December 17, 2024

Kanji Ichikawa (市川 寛二, Ichikawa Kanji; born October 12, 1974), better known by his stage name "Hollywood" Stalker Ichikawa (“ハリウッド”ストーカー市川, “Hariuddo” Sutōkā Ichikawa), is a Japanese retired professional wrestler he is best known tenure for Dragon Gate.

== Professional wrestling career ==
A member of Último Dragón's Toryumon Dojo second class gifted with an extensive amateur wrestling background, Ichikawa is one of the many comedy characters whose purpose is more based on entertaining the fans than it is to actually win matches. Stalker's matches do not last very long, often within five to ten minutes tops. His offenses would have little to no effect on his opponents and they would simply side-step whenever he attempts any sort of high flying move. In some cases, just as Stalker is about to be hit by his opponent's finisher someone, usually his wife Namiko, would throw in the towel to stop the match. The opponent would still hit him with his finisher shortly after. He is very good friends with CIMA and Don Fuji, though the two have no problem beating him up many times to the delight of the fans.

Stalker gained mass popularity with the Reckless Run series. When not wrestling a regular member of the Dragon Gate roster, he would face an endless run of X opponents of great importance. Among those he had faced during the series included The Great Kabuki, Mitsuhiro Matsunaga, Kintaro Kanemura, Yoshihiro Takayama, Toshiaki Kawada, and even female wrestlers such as Aja Kong.

When Stalker started out in Japan in 1999, he had a legendary rivalry with Crazy MAX member TARU, the two having many comedy-themed matches. Eventually, he began to occasionally team with TARU and was made an honorary member of Crazy MAX in August 2000. He was promoted to full member after gaining his first victory, scoring the pin in a Hair vs. Mask tag team match where he and TARU beat M2K's Susumu Mochizuki and Yasushi Kanda. His affiliation with the group would not last, however, for he was booted out three months later on the grounds that he did not fit their heel image. In 2002, he became the first member of the Toryumon roster to marry when he married Namiko. Stalker would rejoin CIMA and Don Fujii after Crazy MAX ended in November 2004 in their new stable, Waku Waku Fuji Land, but when CIMA and Don Fujii renamed the stable to Blood Generation in January, Stalker was booted out for not meeting the strength principle set by the group.

In late 2006, Stalker Ichikawa announced he would be retiring to spend more time with Namiko. On November 12, 2006, Dragon Gate held the Stalker Bom-Ba-Ye show at Shinjuk FACE in Tokyo. In addition to regular Dragon Gate matches featuring the likes of CIMA, Don Fuji, BxB Hulk and Gamma along with guests such as Mr. Pogo, Onryo, and Kevin Steen, the show centered on a series of three matches between Stalker Ichikawa and Akira Tozawa. The first, which opened the show, was a Stalker victory in a Miki Bean Jam Filled Rice Cake Eating Contest, where the first to successfully eat three would win. Half-way through the show, Akira would win in a regular wrestling match that saw members of Akira's Tozawajuku faction as well as CIMA and Don Fuji getting involved. The main event was Akira defeating Stalker in a Vale Tudo fight.

Stalker's retirement lasted a week and was talked into returning to the ring by his wife Namiko. He honoured the stipulation of retiring the Stalker Ichikawa name and returned as Stalker Ichikawa Z. Not long after returning, he engaged in another Reckless Run series which included him facing Pro Wrestling Noah superstar Jun Akiyama.

In 2007, Stalker was invited to wrestle in the United States for the first time in his career. Joining CIMA, Don Fuji, and the Muscle Outlaw'z of Naruki Doi and Masato Yoshino, he competed on the two-night Dynamite Duumvirate Tag Team Title Tournament event for Pro Wrestling Guerrilla at the Burbank National Guard Armory in Burbank, California. On May 19, Stalker opened the first night's show in a loss to Don Fuji. He would open night two on May 20 against one of the PWG Six in Top Gun Talwar, once again on the losing end though walking away with a greater fan base.

Upon his return from the United States, it was announced on May 25 that he would change his name to "Hollywood" Stalker Ichikawa. He also introduced the Open the Owarai Gate Championship, nicknamed O2G and Open the Comedy Gate, with him as its first champion. The idea would be that the belt could only change hands from earning a particular set of laughter from the audience regardless if the champion lost the actual match itself.

The first defense of the championship was made on June 10 at Hakata Star Lanes in Fukuoka with Stalker retaining against Don Fuji in an Extreme Comedy match. which Stalker won in under fifteen seconds. Then, much to Stalker's dismay, they would have an immediate second match only without his title on the line. During the match, they both spilled out into the crowd and bumped into attending guest and reigning official IWGP World Heavyweight Champion Yuji Nagata from New Japan Pro-Wrestling. Nagata and Fuji traded blows, during which Stalker decided to challenge Nagata to be in the Reckless Run series during the Dragon Gate pay-per-view show on July 1 at the Kobe World Hall in Hyogo. Nagata initially refused, but then Stalker tricked him into signing a contract for the match during a New Japan autograph session on June 8. Nagata would defeat Stalker in just over five minutes with a left middle kick.

Stalker would engage in a highly anticipated feud with renowned comedy wrestler Kikutaro during the Storm Gate tour in September. Kikutaro would intrude in the middle of Stalker's matches, setting the stage for their Open the Owarai Gate Championship match on September 22 during the Dragon Gate pay-per-view show at the Ota-ku Gymnasium in Tokyo. Kikutaro won the match in under four minutes and it seemed that he had also won the championship, until Stalker's mother appeared after the match appealing to Kikutaro and the fans that Stalker should retain given that the belt is one of the few things he had left. It worked as Stalker's match with Jackson Florida on October 7 at Nagoya Telepia Hall in Aichi was for the belt. However, he officially lost the belt on October 8 at the Twin Messe Shizuoka in Shizuoka during a 3-way match against Open The Dream Gate Champion CIMA and K-ness. Because Ichikawa failed to receive Audience Approval, CIMA won the belt after pinning him. In their title rematch on October 17, Ichikawa failed in both beating CIMA as well as failing to receive Audience Approval. However, instead of retaining the belt, CIMA dropped it to Jackson Florida, who happened to be sitting at ringside.

A second Stalker Bom-Ba-Ye show took place on November 9, once again at Shinjuk FACE. It was previously implied that this would be his last show and that he would be stepping away from the ring this time due to trouble he and his wife Namiko were having with their marriage and wanted to work things out. The show was based around a team put together by Ichikawa facing a team put together by Naoshi Sano. Like the previous show, Ichikawa and Sano competed in a series of three matches with varying gimmicks. The first was a 3 Question Quiz, which Sano won 3–0. The second was a Sumo Wrestling Match, which Ichikawa won. The third was a Lights Out Death Match. Masaaki Mochizuki was to be the scheduled guest referee, but it was announced that due to an unfortunate accident involving Lupin Matsutani's pistol, Kenichiro Arai would take his place. During the match, Arai lost his glasses. Sano would take advantage by faking a Firebird Splash for the win.

Ichikawa would make a return to the United States on September 5, 2008, to take part in the first Dragon Gate-produced show in the country, "Friday LA Extreme Night." Ichikawa would face Necro Butcher as part of his current Reckless Run Series and in a match dubbed a "Dangerous Comedy Match." He would lose in eighteen seconds, getting knocked out by a punch in retaliation for slapping Necro in the face. He asked for a restart and their match went longer before Necro pinned him with the Necro Bomb on a pile of chairs.

== Championships and accomplishments ==
- Dragon Gate

- Open the Owarai Gate Championship (8 times)

- Tokyo Gurentai

- Tokyo Intercontinental Tag Team Championship (1 time) – with Kikutaro
