= Open the Owarai Gate Championship =

Professional wrestling championship

Open the Owarai Gate
- Former design of the title (2007–2018)

Details
- Promotion: Dragon Gate
- Date established: May 4, 2007
- Current champion: Shin Sakura Hirota
- Date won: May 31, 2026
Statistics
- First champion: "Hollywood" Stalker Ichikawa
- Most reigns: "Hollywood" Stalker Ichikawa (7 reigns)
- Longest reign: Kikutaro (695 days)
- Shortest reign: Kinta Tamaoka, CIMA, Masaaki Mochizuki, Último Dragón (<1 day)
- Oldest champion: Último Dragón (59 years and 4 days)
- Heaviest champion: Don Fujii 220 lb (100 kg)
- Lightest champion: "Hollywood" Stalker Ichikawa 93 lb (42 kg)

The Open the Owarai Gate Championship (オープン・ザ・お笑いゲート王座, Ōpun Za Owarai Gēto Ōza) is a professional wrestling title in Japanese promotion Dragon Gate. The word owarai in the title's name is the Japanese word for comedy.

The championship was first conceived during Stalker Ichikawa's first United States tour, joining fellow Dragon Gate wrestlers Cima, Naruki Doi, Masato Yoshino and Don Fujii during the Pro Wrestling Guerrilla two-night event Dynamite Duumvirate Tag Team Title Tournament on May 19 and May 20, 2007, in Burbank, California. In addition to changing his name to "Hollywood" Stalker Ichikawa, he also gave birth to the Open the Owarai Gate Championship which he wore during the second night of the event against Top Gun Talwar. The name change and the introduction of the belt was made official on May 25. The championship was deactivated at Dead or Alive 2018, when Shingo Takagi, per stipulation, was the last person to escape the cage in the Hair vs. Hair Steel Cage Survival seven-way match.

The championship is both unique and very unusual. The title is not necessarily defended by traditional methods of simply beating the champion by pinfalls or submission. While such a situation can still happen, the title also has a stipulation regarding audience approval during the match. This means that while the champion could still technically lose the match, he could retain the belt simply by having earning more applause and/or laughter from the audience.

The championship was defended for the first time on June 10 at Hakata Star Lanes in Fukuoka, Fukuoka. In addition, Ichikawa also began by having ten "Free Defense" tickets that would ensure he would always retain the title regardless. However, before his defense against Kikutaro on September 22 at the Ota-ku Gymnasium in Tokyo, the tickets were destroyed and he was forced to defend the belt on his own merit. He was able to successfully retain due to unusual circumstances since, such as his mother appealing to the crowd and later his opponent feeling sorry.

On June 3, 2023, at their Korakuen Hall show, the company announced the belt would be returning. They made Konomama Ichikawa the interim champion, and announced the new official champion would be decided at the Buyuden Zero vol.2 event on July 8, 2023. At the event, Kikutaro defeated Ichikawa to become the lineal champion.

== Title history ==
Key
No.	Overall reign number
Reign	Reign number for the specific champion
Days	Number of days held
Defenses	Number of successful defenses
<1	Reign lasted less than a day

No.	Champion	Championship change			Reign statistics			Notes	Ref.
No.	Champion	Date	Event	Location	Reign	Days	Defenses	Notes	Ref.
Dragon Gate
1	Stalker Ichikawa	May 25, 2007	The Gate of Maximum	Burbank, California	1	136	7	Conceived during a visit to Pro Wrestling Guerrilla; officially defended on June 10 in Fukuoka.	
2	Cima	October 8, 2007	The Gate of Victory	Shizuoka, Japan	1	<1	0	Defeated Ichikawa and K-Ness in a three-way match. Ichikawa failed to gain approval from the crowd, so CIMA, as the match winner, won the title.	
3	Jackson Florida	October 17, 2007	The Gate of Victory	Hyogo, Japan	1	94	1	Cima fails his first defense for various purposes against Stalker Ichikawa. Jackson Florida becomes champion since he was sitting at ring	
4	Masaaki Mochizuki	January 19, 2008	Wrestle Jam 3rd Season	Nagoya, Japan	1	14	0	Mochizuki won the title by disqualification and fan support.	
5	Jackson Florida	February 2, 2008	Truth Gate	Hakata, Japan	2	160	5		
6	Johnson Florida	July 11, 2008	Nex 2nd Anniversary Show	Tokyo, Japan	1	10	0		
7	Ichikawa	July 21, 2008	Rainbow Gate	Kumamoto, Japan	2	26	0	Ichikawa stole title belt from Johnson after beating him in three way match with K-Ness. Repeated attempts to contact the title belt commissioner were met with only his voicemail, so ICHIKAWA was just named the 7th champion.	
8	Jackson Florida	August 16, 2008	Summer Adventure Tag League	Toyama, Japan	3	212	4		
9	"Hollywood" Stalker Ichikawa	March 16, 2009	Glorious Gate	Kumamoto, Japan	3	4	0		
10	Kinta Tamaoka	March 20, 2009	Glorious Gate	Kobe, Japan	1	<1	0	The title match was between Stalker and Masaaki Mochizuki, but Kinta - the referee - received more fan support than either of them, so he became champion.	
—	Vacated	March 20, 2009	Glorious Gate	Kobe, Japan	—	—	—	Vacated immediately after winning it.	
11	"Hollywood" Stalker Ichikawa	March 29, 2009	Glorious Gate	Fukui, Japan	4	6	0		
12	Anthony W. Mori	April 4, 2009	Yokozuna Impact!	Nagoya, Japan	1	41	1		
13	Kikutaro	May 15, 2009	Aggressive Gate	Tokyo, Japan	1	695	3	Kikutaro becomes 13th Champion via fan support	
14	Don Fujii	April 10, 2011	Don Fujii Triumphant Hometown Return	Tsu, Japan	1	133	0	Don Fujii becomes 14th Champion via fan support	
15	"Hollywood" Stalker Ichikawa	August 21, 2011	Storm Gate 2011	Hakata, Japan	5	76	4	"Hollywood" Stalker Ichikawa becomes 15th Champion via fan support. CIMA refuses the title on September 24, 2011, despite getting fan support.	
16	Rich Swann	November 5, 2011	Crown Gate 2011	Gifu, Japan	1	50	0	Swann became the 16th Champion via fan support.	
—	Vacated	December 25, 2011	N/A	Fukuoka, Japan	—	—	—	Vacated after Naoki Tanizaki stole the title belt from Swann.	
17	Kenichiro Arai	August 2, 2012	Summer Adventure Tag League 2012	Tokyo, Japan	1	140	1	Arai defeated "Hollywood" Stalker Ichikawa via fan support to become the 17th Champion.	
18	Kikutaro	December 20, 2012	Fantastic Gate 2012	Tokyo, Japan	2	77	2	Kikutaro became the 18th Champion via fan support.	
19	Ryo "Jimmy" Saito	March 7, 2013	Glorious Gate 2013	Tokyo, Japan	1	626	7	Saito became the 19th Champion via fan support.	
20	Jimmy Kanda	November 23, 2014	Crown Gate 2014	Saga, Japan	1	73	1	Kanda became the 20th Champion via fan support.	
21	Yosuke Santa Maria	February 4, 2015	Truth Gate 2015	Kasukabe, Japan	1	53	2	Santa Maria became the 21st Champion via fan support.	
22	Akira Tozawa	March 29, 2015	Glorious Gate 2015	Saga, Japan	1	230	1	Tozawa became the 22nd Champion via fan support.	
23	Mr. Nakagawa	November 14, 2015	Crown Gate 2015	Fukuoka, Japan	1	9	2	The title match was between "Hollywood" Stalker Ichikawa and Akira Tozawa, the reigning champion, but Nakagawa - the referee - received more fan support than either of them, so he became champion.	
24	Masato Yoshino	November 23, 2015	Crown Gate 2015	Okayama, Japan	1	132	0	Yoshino became the 23rd champion via fan support.	
—	Vacated	April 3, 2016	N/A	Kobe, Japan	—	—	—	Yoshino was stripped of the title after failing to defend it within the previous three months.	
25	Cima	April 10, 2016	The Gate of Passion 2016	Tsu, Japan	2	<1	0	Defeated "Hollywood" Stalker Ichikawa for the vacated title.	
26	"Hollywood" Stalker Ichikawa	April 10, 2016	The Gate of Passion 2016	Tsu, Japan	6	97	2	Since CIMA did not want the title, his opponent Ichikawa was awarded the championship.	
27	Masaaki Mochizuki	July 16, 2016	Rainbow Gate 2016	Tsu, Japan	2	<1	0		
28	"Hollywood" Stalker Ichikawa	July 16, 2016	Rainbow Gate 2016	Tsu, Japan	7	491	1	Mochizuki returned the title immediately after.	
29	Cima	November 19, 2017	The Gate of Evolution 2017 – Day 10	Nobeoka, Japan	3	7	0		
—	Vacated	November 26, 2017	Memorial Gate in Sendai 2017	Sendai, Japan	—	—	—		
30	Ryo Saito	November 26, 2017	Memorial Gate in Sendai 2017	Sendai, Japan	2	100	0	Defeated "Hollywood" Stalker Ichikawa for the vacant title.	
31	Shingo Takagi	March 6, 2018	Kotoka Road To Final - The Ending	Tokyo, Japan	1	61	1		
—	Deactivated	May 6, 2018	—	—	—	—	—		
32	Kikutaro	July 8, 2023	DG/Masaaki Mochizuki Produce Buyuden Rei ~ Zero ~ Vol. 2	Tokyo, Japan	3	89	0	Defeated Kono Mama Ichikawa to win the reactivated title.	
33	Lingerie Muto	October 5, 2023	DG/Masaaki Mochizuki Produce Buyuden Rei ~ Zero ~ Vol. 3	Tokyo, Japan	1	469	1	Match ended in a double knockout but was ruled as a win for Muto.	
34	Takashi Yoshida	January 16, 2025	Open The New Year Gate 2025	Tokyo, Japan	1	44	1	As "Takako Yoshida", a drag persona.	
35	Kuishinbo Kamen	March 1, 2025	Truth Gate 2025	Osaka, Japan	1	246	1		
36	Jiro Shimbashi	November 2, 2025	Gate Of Destiny 2025	Osaka, Japan	1	44	1		
37	Último Dragón	December 16, 2025	Fantastic Gate 2025	Tokyo, Japan	1	<1	0	Dragon won the championship through the viewers' vote.	
—	Vacated	December 16, 2025	Fantastic Gate 2025	Tokyo, Japan	—	—	—	Vacated immediately after winning it.	
37	Otoko Sakari	February 20, 2026	Truth Gate 2026	Nagasaki, Japan	1	<1	0	Defeated Jiro Shimbashi to win the vacant title.	
—	Vacated	February 20, 2026	Fantastic Gate 2025	Tokyo, Japan	—	—	—	Vacated immediately after winning it.	
38	Yosuke Santa Maria	February 28, 2026	Glorious Gate 2026	Osaka, Japan	2	92	0	Defeated Jiro Shimbashi to win the vacant title.	
39	Shin Sakura Hirota	May 31, 2026	Marvelous	Tokyo, Japan	1	147+	0	This was a Marvelous That's Women Pro Wrestling event. Hirota became the first female wrestler to hold the title.	

== Combined reigns ==
As of October 25, 2026.

†	Indicates the current champion

Rank	Wrestler	No. of Reigns	Combined defenses	Combined days
1	Kikutaro	3	5	861
2	"Hollywood" Stalker Ichikawa/Ichikawa	7	14	836
3	Ryo Saito/Ryo "Jimmy" Saito	2	7	726
4	Lingerie Muto	1	1	469
5	Jackson Florida	3	10	466
6	Kuishinbo Kamen	1	1	246
7	Akira Tozawa	1	1	230
8	Shin Sakura Hirota †	1	0	147+
9	Yosuke Santa Maria	2	2	145
10	Kenichiro Arai	1	1	140
11	Don Fujii	1	0	133
12	Masato Yoshino	1	0	132
13	Jimmy Kanda	1	1	73
14	Shingo Takagi	1	0	61
15	Rich Swann	1	0	50
16	Jiro Shimbashi	1	1	44
16	Takashi Yoshida	1	1	44
18	Anthony W. Mori	1	1	41
19	Cima	3	0	16
20	Masaaki Mochizuki	2	0	14
21	Johnson Florida	1	0	10
22	Mr. Nakagawa	1	2	9
23	Kinta Tamaoka	1	0	<1
23	Otoko Sakari	1	0	<1
23	Último Dragón	1	0	<1

== See also ==
- Osaka Pro Wrestling Owarai Championship

== Exterminal link ==
- Open the Owarai Gate Championship
