= Susumu Yokosuka =

Japanese professional wrestler

- Yosuka in November 2017

Personal information
- Born: February 18, 1978 (age 48) Yokosuka, Kanagawa Prefecture, Japan

Professional wrestling career
- Ring name(s): Susumu Yokosuka; Susumu Mochizuki; BxB Susumu; Jimmy Susumu; Sumo Susumu
- Billed height: 1.73 m (5 ft 8 in)
- Billed weight: 77 kg (170 lb)
- Trained by: Último Dragón; Dos Caras
- Debut: November 22, 1998

Susumu Mochizuki (望月享, Mochizuki Susumu; born February 18, 1978), better known by his ring name Susumu Yokosuka (横須賀ススム, Yokosuka Susumu) is a Japanese professional wrestler currently signed to Dragon Gate. He is not related to fellow Dragon Gate wrestler and long-term ally/rival Masaaki Mochizuki, who debuted much earlier for WAR.

== Professional wrestling career ==
=== Mexico ===
After a brief stay in the Michinoku Pro Wrestling dojo, he entered Ultimo Dragon's dojo in Mexico. He debuted in 1998 as a third-term student. He and Yasushi Kanda formed a tag team there, and they found success, winning the IWRG Intercontinental Tag Team Championship. They would hold these titles upon their arrival in Toryumon.

=== Toryumon / Dragon Gate ===
==== M2K ====
He and Kanda debuted in Toryumon as a heel team, causing mayhem in matches and frequently forcing double count-outs to disappoint fans and ruin shows. They were invited to join the legendary Crazy Max stable and accepted but turned on them later that same night. A few months later they were joined by Masaaki Mochizuki, and they dubbed themselves M2K (meaning two Mochizukis and Kanda). They added Darkness Dragon, Chocoball Kobe, and Genki Horiguchi to their ranks over time (Horiguchi replaced Kobe).

On December 15, 2002, he won his first singles title when he topped Kenichiro Arai for the NWA World Welterweight Title, but six days later he was stripped of the belt because he won it due to outside interference. He won it a second time from Arai cleanly on May 27 of the following year but lost it to Ryo Saito on September 30. He also had two reigns as UWA World Trios Champion, the first time with Kanda and Dragon in July, and the second with Dragon and Masaaki Mochizuki in October.

After Masaaki Mochizuki was kicked out of M2K early in 2002 for trying to reform it, Susumu Mochizuki challenged Masaaki Mochizuki to a match on February 24 for the rights to the Mochizuki surname. Susumu Mochizuki lost and was forced to rename himself Susumu Yokosuka, after his hometown.

==== Do FIXER ====
Magnum TOKYO would take over M2K, eventually transforming it into Do FIXER after Yasushi Kanda retired due to neck problems. Like all of his stablemates, he served as a backup dancer for Magnum TOKYO. During this time, Yokosuka formed a long-lasting tag team with K-ness (formerly known as Darkness Dragon) and continued to establish himself as a choker. He and K-ness would make it to the finals of the inaugural Rey de Parejas Tournament in 2003 but lost to Dotti Shuji and Brother Yasshi. Also in 2003, he captured the UWA World Trios Championship for a third time that year in May with Genki Horiguchi and Ryo Saito.

==== Final M2K ====
Things remained quiet for him until July 7, 2004. After Masaaki Mochizuki was kicked out of Aagan Iisou, he reconciled with him, Second Doi, and Kenichiro Arai, and after K-ness returned from a stint of injury, the five of them would form Final M2K. This caused him to depart from Do FIXER. On September 17, 2004, Yokosuka faced CIMA for CIMA's Open The Dream Gate title but was unsuccessful in his challenge. 2005 was another quiet but steady year, and he finally began to shake the choke artist stigma. He made it to the finals of that year’s King of Gate Tournament, but he lost to Ryo Saito.

2006 saw him finally emerge as a top-line player. On April 23, he usurped Ryo Saito as Open the Dream Gate Champion, and soon after, Mochizuki named him the leader of Final M2K so he could join Magnum TOKYO in his short-lived Renaissance project. However, he did not reach the status of ace, and his title reign became overshadowed by other events in the promotion. He had successful defenses against BxB Hulk, Dragon Kid and Pentagon Black. On November 23, he lost the title to Don Fujii in his fourth defense, and on January 14, 2007, Final M2K was brought to an end after he, Mochizuki, and K-ness lost a match to CIMA, Don Fujii and Matt Sydal of the also-ending Blood Generation.

==== Typhoon ====
He would soon join CIMA in his new Typhoon unit, and he reunited with Ryo Saito in it, and they formed the RyoSuka tag team. This tandem brought him success, as he and Saito would win the WAR I-J Heavyweight Tag Team Titles in July and had two reigns as Open the Triangle Gate Champions with CIMA.

In 2008, he and Saito added another title to their list of accolades, winning the Open the Twin Gate Championship from Kenichiro Arai and Taku Iwasa on May 5. They defended it three times before losing to inaugural champions Speed Muscle – Naruki Doi and Masato Yoshino – on September 26. In the interim, Shingo Takagi joined Typhoon, and he was the only member who did not take well to it, creating some dissention. He fought Takagi for his Open the Dream Gate title but lost. After that, Takagi was booted from Typhoon for trying to banish Yokosuka and for attacking CIMA. The rest of the year remained quiet for him up until the end, when he, Ryo Saito and Dragon Kid lost a Unit Split Survival Three-Way Nine-Man Tag Match against teams from World-1 and Real Hazard.

==== WARRIORS-5 ====
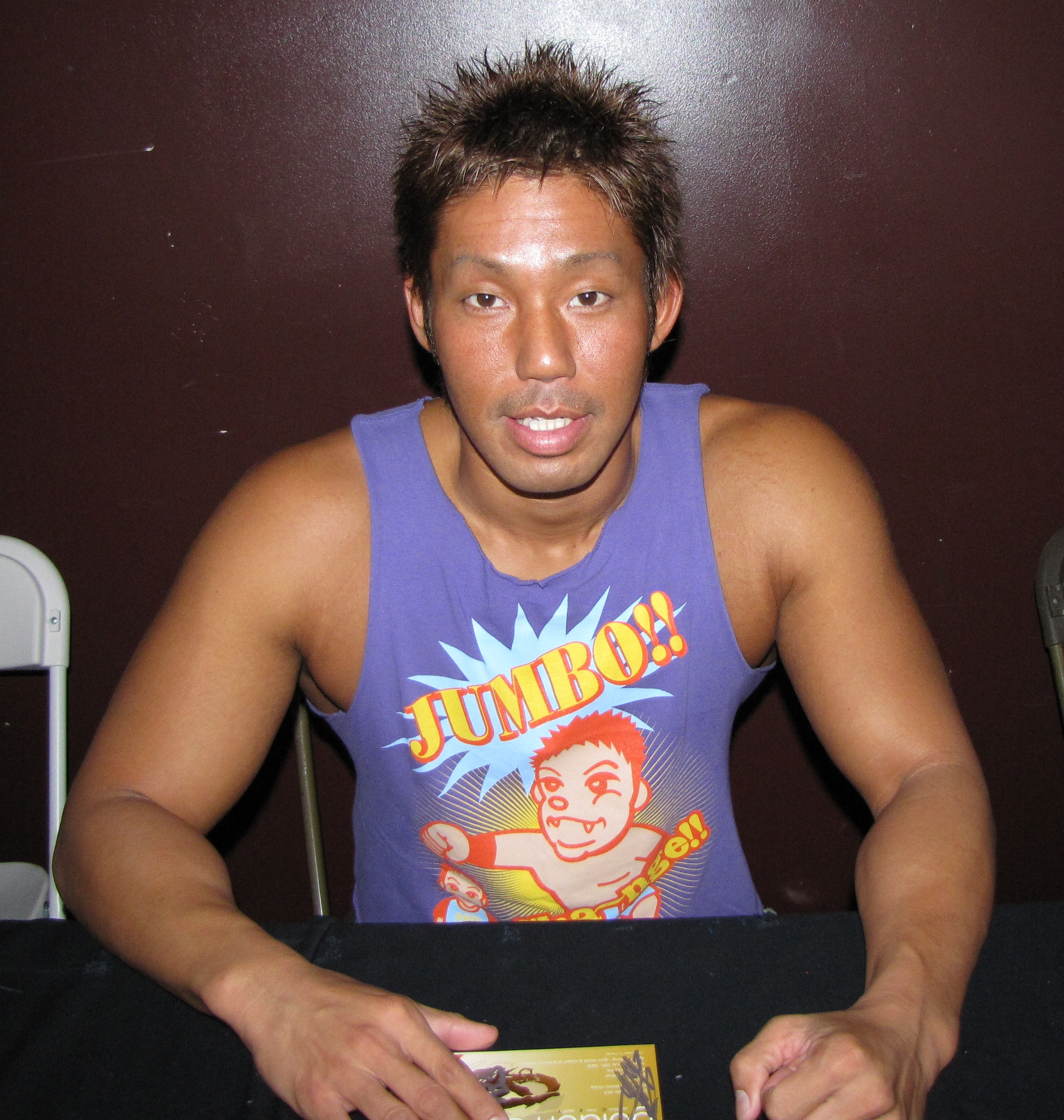
Yokosuka in 2009

He continued his team with Saito, and they were given a shot at the Open the Twin Gate titles held by YAMATO and Cyber Kong on February 15, 2009. However, near the end of the match, Saito turned on him, causing him to take the fall, and joined up with Real Hazard. Ryo and the rest of Real Hazard then proceeded to beat him up until Gamma came down to make the save. He began to team with Gamma, and they were given a shot at YAMATO and Kong’s Twin Gate titles on March 1, but with the added stipulation that Gamma would be banished from Dragon Gate if he lost. However, he and Gamma pulled through and won the titles after some assistance from Real Hazard member KAGETORA, and after that, a returning CIMA brought them and KAGETORA into his new stable WARRIORS-5. They would hold the titles until May 5, when they lost them to Ryo Saito and Genki Horiguchi in a Three-Way Match that also included Kenichiro Arai and Yasushi Kanda. On October 25, Yokosuka challenged Naruki Doi for his Open the Dream Gate title. Leading up to the match, Yokosuka used Doi's finisher, the Muscular Bomb, to pin his opponents, and also vowed that he would not be pinned due to the Muscular Bomb. Despite Yokosuka successfully blocking Doi from using the Muscular Bomb and hitting Doi with a Muscular Bomb himself, Doi still pinned Yokosuka with the V9 Clutch to retain the title.

In November, he began to mysteriously associate himself with Real Hazard member Dr. Muscle. The first incident with him came on the 11th: Gamma cost Yokosuka a match against Ryo Saito when he tried to throw protein powder into Saito's eyes and it hit Susumu instead, allowing him to be pinned. After the match, Yokosuka left with Dr. Muscle. On the 14th, Dr. Muscle drew Yokosuka's attention away from a tag match that he and Gamma were in against Naruki Doi and BxB Hulk, causing them to lose. After the match, Yokosuka attacked Hulk with a Jumbo no Kachi! and then left with Dr. Muscle again. Following this, Dr. Muscle began to exhibit moves from Yokosuka's move set, which continued throughout the next couple of weeks. On the 23rd, Yokosuka blew off CIMA and Gamma after winning a match, and later on that night, Gamma tried to unmask Dr. Muscle, but the Doctor escaped.

Finally, on December 3, Yokosuka's true colors became known: After he didn't show up for a tag team match he had with KAGETORA against Ryo Saito and Genki Horiguchi, causing KAGETORA to lose, Dr. Muscle came out and struck down KAGETORA with a Mugen and Jumbo no Kachi!, then unmasked to reveal himself to be Yokosuka. He joined Saito and Horiguchi in beating down KAGETORA some more before CIMA and Gamma stopped him, and he officially joined Real Hazard and reformed his team with Saito. On December 6, he faced BxB Hulk for his Open the Freedom Gate title, but lost the title match.

==== Real Hazard ====
Saito and Yokosuka's reunion was quickly derailed, however, when Ryo suffered a ruptured Achilles tendon on December 15, sidelining him. An unknown new member of Real Hazard was then scheduled to take Saito's place in all of his matches for the remainder of the tour, and five days later, it was revealed to be K-ness. He and Yokosuka reformed their "K-neSuka" team straight away.

On January 10, 2010, Genki Horiguchi announced that Real Hazard would start winning matches through teamwork rather than illegal tactics. He initially started alone on this mission, but six days later, Yokosuka and K-ness decided to help him in his pursuit of clean fights. However, they all found themselves on the losing end of trios matches, with Horiguchi taking the fall every time, and a divide formed in Real Hazard over the clean fights issue, with them on one side and Yasushi Kanda, Kzy, and Takuya Sugawara - who wanted to win through illegal methods - on the other. On February 10, after KAGETORA accidentally cost Sugawara a shot at becoming the next challenger for the Open the Dream Gate Title, tensions boiled over. Yokosuka and K-ness left Real Hazard, along with Horiguchi. K-neSuka also agreed to stop teaming with Horiguchi, since they all did not like how Horiguchi was losing constantly, and they all felt that that was preventing K-neSuka from getting to the top of the tag team division. On May 13, 2010, Yokosuka and K-ness defeated Cyber Kong and Shingo Takagi to win the Open the Twin Gate Championship. After the longest reign in the title's history, with four successful defenses, Yokosuka and K-ness lost the Open the Twin Gate Championship to Gamma and Naruki Doi on November 23, 2010.

==== WORLD-1 ====
On December 4, Yokouska and K-ness joined WORLD-1. On April 14, 2011, Yokosuka, BxB Hulk and PAC failed to win the Open the Triangle Gate Championship from Blood Warriors (CIMA, Dragon Kid and Ricochet) and as a result, World-1 was forced to disband.

==== Junction Three ====
On April 24 former World-1 members Yokosuka, BxB Hulk, PAC and Masato Yoshino agreed to form a new alliance with Masaaki Mochizuki to battle Blood Warriors. On June 8, the new group was named Junction Three about being a union between the former members of World-1, KAMIKAZE and the Veteran-gun. On December 1, Yokosuka and KAGETORA failed to capture the Open the Twin Gate Championship in a match against the Blood Warriors team of Akira Tozawa and BxB Hulk and as a result were forced to change their ring names to Jimmy Susumu and Jimmy KAGETORA, respectively. On February 9, 2012, Junction Three was forced to disband, after losing a fourteen-man elimination tag team match to Blood Warriors.

==== Jimmyz ====
On March 3, Susumu formed the Jimmyz stable with Genki Horiguchi H-A-Gee-Mee, Jimmy Kanda, Ryo "Jimmy" Saito and Jimmy KAGETORA. The following day, Susumu and KAGETORA defeated Akira Tozawa and BxB Hulk to win the Open the Twin Gate Championship. They lost the title to BxB Hulk and "Naoki Tanisaki" on June 10, but regained them on June 17 in a 3-way Elimination tag team match which also included MadoGiwa Windows members K-ness & Kenichiro Arai. They would lose the Twin Gate belts to Akatsuki members Shingo Takagi and YAMATO at the Kobe Pro-Wrestling PPV on July 22, 2012. On May 31, 2014, Susumu defeated T-Hawk in the finals to win the 2014 King of Gate tournament. On February 14, 2016, Susumu defeated Shingo Takagi to win his second Open the Dream Gate Championship, ending his ten-year drought of holding a singles championship with the promotion. He would drop the title back to Takagi on March 6. On June 19, Susumu and Jimmy Kagetora defeated T-Hawk and Big R Shimizu to win the Open the Twin Gate Championship.

=== Action Zone Wrestling ===
Susumu Yokosuka made his Hawaii debut on September 5, 2007, losing to stablemate Dragon Kid. The match was voted AZW Match of the Year for 2007. Susumu returned to AZW on January 7, 2008, where he defeated AZW wrestler Kaniala.

=== Dragon Gate USA ===
On Dragon Gate USA's first pay-per-view Enter the Dragon, first aired on September 4, 2009, Yokosuka teamed with CIMA in a losing effort against The Young Bucks. On March 27, 2010, at Mercury Rising, Yokosuka unsuccessfully challenged YAMATO for his Open the Dream Gate title.

== Championships and accomplishments ==
- All Japan Pro Wrestling
  - World Junior Heavyweight Championship (1 time)
  - World Junior Heavyweight Championship Tournament (2020)
- Dragon Gate
  - I-J Heavyweight Tag Team Championship (1 time) – with Ryo Saito
  - Open the Dream Gate Championship (2 times)
  - Open the Brave Gate Championship (1 time)
  - Open the Triangle Gate Championship (12 times) – with CIMA and Ryo Saito (2), K-ness. and Masaaki Mochizuki (1), Mr. Kyu Kyu Naoki Tanizaki Toyonaka Dolphin and Ryo "Jimmy" Saito (1), Jimmy Kanda and Mr. Kyu Kyu Naoki Tanizaki Toyonaka Dolphin (1), Genki Horiguchi H.A.Gee.Mee!! and Ryo "Jimmy" Saito (1), Genki Horiguchi H.A.Gee.Mee!! and Jimmy Kagetora (1), Jimmy Kanda and Ryo "Jimmy" Saito (1), Kzy and Genki Horiguchi (2) and Kagetora and BxB Hulk (1)
  - Open the Twin Gate Championship (9 times, current) – with Ryo Saito (1), Gamma (1), K-ness. (1), King Shimizu (1), Jimmy Kagetora (4) and Yasushi Kanda (1)
  - King of Gate (2014)
  - Summer Adventure Tag League (2014) – with Jimmy Kagetora
  - Summer Adventure Tag League (2015) – with Jimmy K-ness J.K.S.
  - Sixth Triple Crown Champion
  - Sixth Grand Slam Champion
- International Wrestling Revolution Group
  - IWRG Intercontinental Tag Team Championship (1 time) – with Yasushi Kanda
- Pro Wrestling Illustrated
  - Ranked No. 139 of the top 500 wrestlers in the PWI 500 in 2012
- Pro Wrestling Zero1
  - NWA International Lightweight Tag Team Championship (1 time) – with Jimmy Kagetora
- Toryumon Japan
  - NWA World Welterweight Championship (2 times)
  - UWA World Trios Championship (3 times) (Note: The UWA closed in 1995, since then various UWA titles have been used by promotions in Mexico and Japan, this title was promoted by Toryumon Japan at the time Dragon Kid won it.) – with Yasushi Kanda and Darkness Dragon (1), Masaaki Mochizuki and Darkness Dragon (1) and Genki Horiguchi and Ryo Saito (1)
