= Dragon Kid =

Japanese professional wrestler

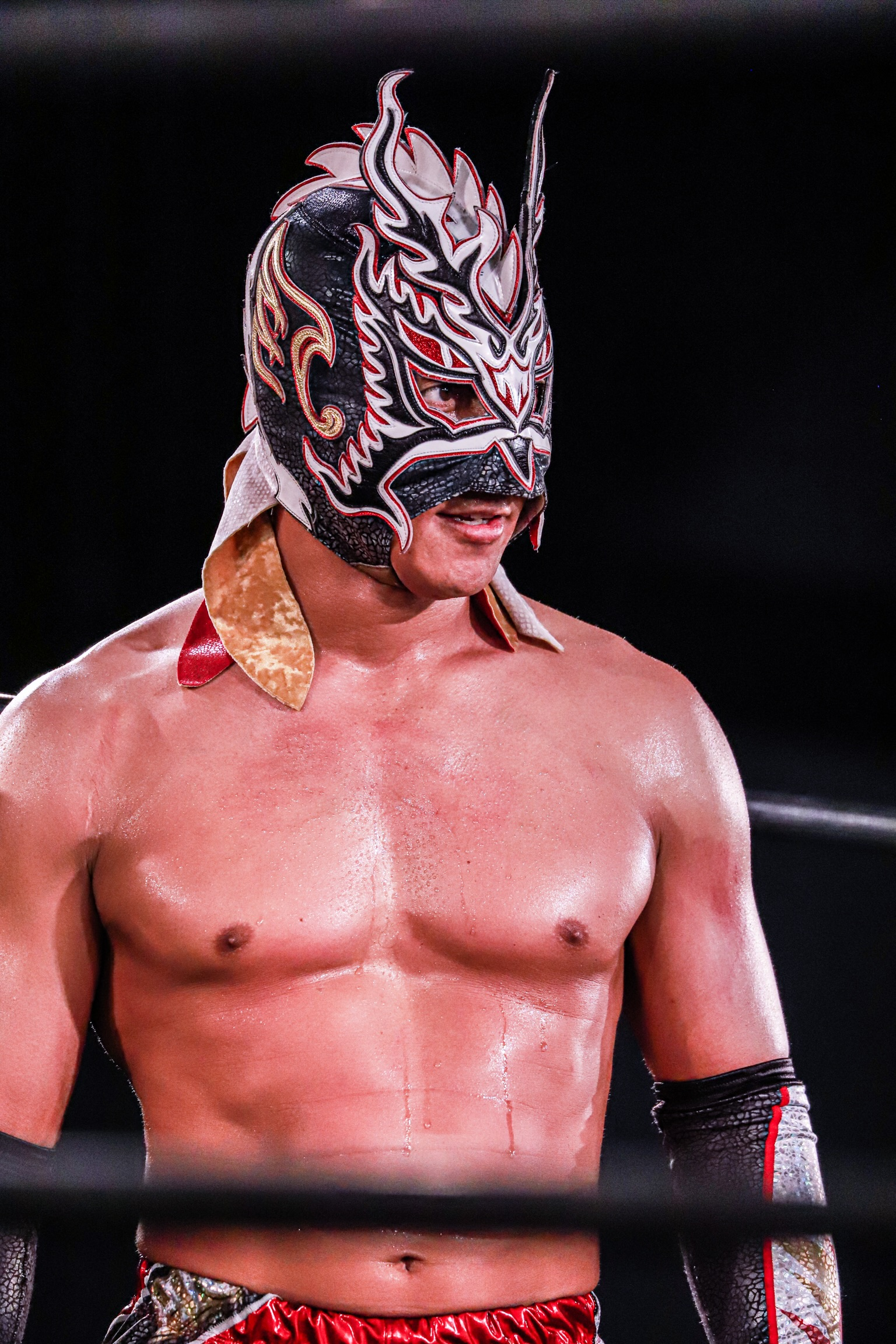
- Dragon Kid in September 2022

Personal information
- Born: Nobuyoshi Nakamura (中村信義, Nakamura Nobuyoshi); February 2, 1976 (age 50) Tōkai, Aichi, Japan

Professional wrestling career
- Ring name(s): Dragon Kid; Little Dragon; Hayabusa Kid
- Billed height: 1.63 m (5 ft 4 in)
- Billed weight: 70 kg (154 lb)
- Trained by: Último Dragón; Dos Caras
- Debut: 1994

Nobuyoshi Nakamura (中村信義, Nakamura Nobuyoshi; born February 2, 1976) is a Japanese professional wrestler currently working for Dragon Gate as Dragon Kid (ドラゴン・キッド, Doragon Kiddo).

Nakamura initially broke into the wrestling business with Frontier Martial Arts Wrestling (FMW), but was not allowed to be a wrestler by owner Atsushi Onita and instead worked as a referee for the promotion during the mid-1990s. Longing to become a wrestler, he left FMW in 1997 and joined Ultimo Dragon's Toryumón Gym, where he was given the gimmick of “Dragon Kid”, a character he has used for his entire career.

== Professional wrestling career ==
=== Training and early career (1994–1997) ===
Nobuyoshi Nakamura wanted to be a wrestler for a long time, but he was told that he was too small to become one. He started training in the Frontier Martial-Arts Wrestling dojo in 1994, but ended up as a referee (FMW head Atsushi Onita, wary of injury to smaller wrestlers from his days as a junior heavyweight in All Japan Pro Wrestling, prevented him from trying to achieve his potential). Nakamura never gave up his dream of being a wrestler. He was eventually introduced to Último Dragón by Nakamura's relative Jinsei Shinzaki, who told him that his wrestling school had no size restriction, so he entered the Último Dragón Gym.

=== Toryumon and Dragon Gate (1997–present) ===
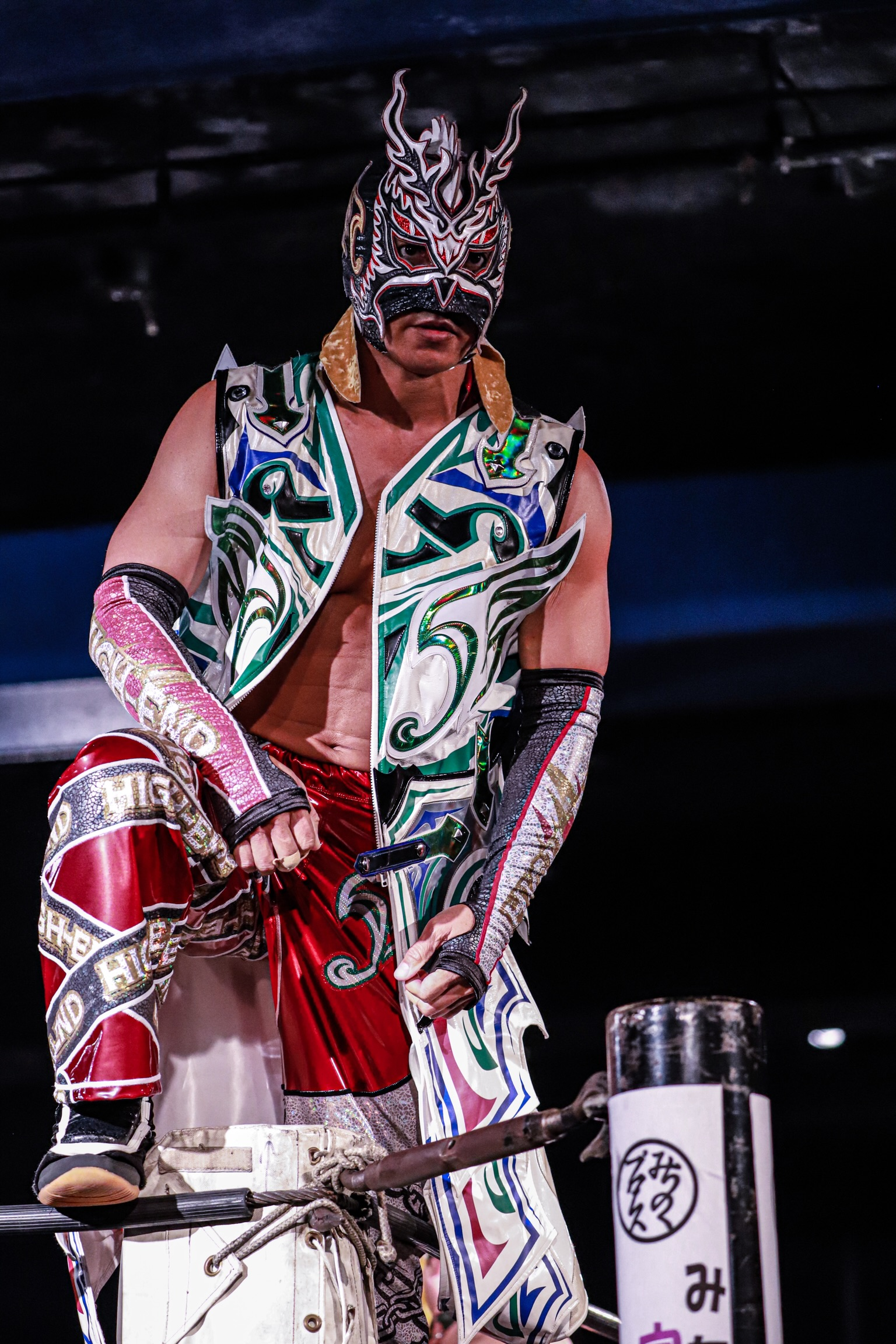
Dragon Kid at a show held in Shinjuku Face, September 2022

Nakamura debuted in 1997 as a first term student, and was given the gimmick of Dragon Kid, Último Dragón's pupil, as he was perceived as the Último Dragón's heir. He spent 1998 wrestling in Mexico, but he did some spot participation with Michinoku Pro and also had a short run with World Championship Wrestling working as "Little Dragon." His only appearance on Monday Nitro would be a victory over Eddie Guerrero via rollup after interference.

In 1999, he debuted in Japan along with the rest of Toryumon. In February, he captured his first title, defeating Dr. Cerebro to win the vacant NWA World Welterweight Title. He would lose the title two months later to SUWA, and in that match, he suffered a bad knee injury that put him out of action for the remainder of the year. He would return to action on the first show of 2000 and proceeded to feud with SUWA. Though he failed to win the NWA World Welterweight Title back from SUWA, he did defeat him in a Mask vs. Hair match on August 24. Shortly after winning, he was attacked by a debuting Darkness Dragon, and they started a feud that would last for a little over two years. It ended on September 8, 2002, when he defeated Darkness Dragon in a Best of Three Falls Mask vs. Mask Match, forcing Darkness to unmask.

Darkness Dragon was booted out of M2K following the loss. He announced the formation of a new stable dubbed Do FIXER, and he invited Kid and Ryo Saito to join him, and they both accepted. On October 28, after Magnum TOKYO dissolved M2K, he announced that he and the remnants of M2K were the real Do FIXER, and that Darkness Dragon - now renamed K-ness - was still a member of the group and was sent into the home army (Seikigun) to cause problems within it. It worked in that Ryo Saito was not welcomed back into Seikigun, but Dragon Kid, however, was.

When Seikigun disbanded at the end of 2002, he joined Masaaki Mochizuki's Shin M2K stable at the start of 2003. He stayed with the group until it dissolved in December, after Mochizuki lost a match to stablemate Kenichiro Arai. After that, Kid would go unaligned until mid-2004, and in May he won that year's El Numero Uno Tournament to the surprise of everyone. In mid-2004, he became a member of Do FIXER, and would stay in it until the very end. During his tenure with them, he won the Open the Brave Gate Championship from inaugural champion Naruki Doi in November 2005, and would hold the Open the Triangle Gate Titles with Ryo Saito and Genki Horiguchi on three separate occasions in 2005 and 2006. During the last few months of 2006, he contracted appendicitis, forcing him out of action for several months.

2007 he won his first non-Japanese promotion's championship, wXw's Lightweight Championship, in Essen, Germany after defeating the British wrestler PAC.

When Dragon Kid returned in early 2007, Saito decided to end Do FIXER activity following the betrayal of Genki Horiguchi, and brought him along into CIMA's new Typhoon stable. He joined them with a new look, marking the first ever change of his ring attire. When Saito and Susumu Yokosuka started teaming together, he and CIMA started teaming up exclusively with each other, calling themselves CK-1. When CIMA was out injured in mid-2008, Dragon Kid formed a team with Shingo Takagi for that year's Summer Adventure Tag League Tournament. The team proved very successful, even making it to the finals, but they lost out to the previous year's winners Naruki Doi and Masato Yoshino.

On December 28, he, Ryo Saito and Susumu Yokosuka fought a Unit Split Survival Three-Way Six-Man Tag Match against teams from WORLD-1 and Real Hazard, and they lost, bringing about the end of Typhoon. However, he did not remain unaligned for very long, for on January 11, 2009, he joined Shingo Takagi's new unit, KAMIKAZE. On February 15, he, Shingo, and Taku Iwasa won the Open the Triangle Gate titles, but they lost them two months later.

At the end of the year, when the Generation War was going on, the Veteran-gun extended an invite to him to join their ranks. He did not accept nor reject the invitation, which eventually caused his KAMIKAZE stablemates to question where his loyalties lied. After Akira Tozawa interrupted an Ultra Hurricanrana attempt in a six-man tag match on January 11, 2010, causing them and YAMATO to lose, Kid decided to leave KAMIKAZE and side with CIMA, Gamma Susumu Yokosuka and KAGETORA in the WARRIORS-5 group, and by default the Veteran-gun.

Dragon Kid turned heel on January 14, 2011, along with the rest of WARRIORS, when they attacked Masato Yoshino and World-1, and joined forces with Naruki Doi's group. On January 18 the new group was named Blood Warriors. On May 15, the rest of Blood Warriors turned on Dragon Kid and kicked him out of the group, despite the fact that he still held the Open the Triangle Gate Championship with CIMA and Ricochet. He then joined Masaaki Mochizuki's new stable, Junction Three, to battle his former group. As a result, the title was declared vacant. On June 19 Dragon Kid gained a measure of revenge on Blood Warriors, when he and PAC defeated Ryo Saito and Genki Horiguchi to win the Open the Twin Gate Championship. They would lose the title to Blood Warriors representatives CIMA and Ricochet on July 17. On February 9, 2012, Junction Three was forced to disband, after losing a fourteen-man elimination tag team match to Blood Warriors. After joining the Veteran-gun, Dragon Kid won the Open the Brave Gate Championship for the second time on May 6, defeating Ricochet. After a reign of 364 days and nine successful defenses, he lost the title to Masato Yoshino on May 5, 2013. He would go on to team with Oretachi Veteran-gun stablemate K-Ness to win the Open the Twin Gate Championship, and with K-Ness and Masaaki Mochizuki, won the Open the Triangle Gate Championship. He would suffer an injury later on, and would be forced to vacate both titles. On August 17, 2014, Dragon Kid and Masaaki Mochizuki quit Oretachi Veteran-gun to form a new stable with BxB Hulk, which on September 9, 2014, would be named Dia.HEARTS. On February 4, 2016, Dia.HEARTS was forced to disband after losing a match to Monster Express and VerserK. On April 7, Dragon Kid joined the Over Generation unit.

On April 6, 2018, Kid defeated Kagetora to win the vacant Open the Brave Gate Championship for the third time.

== Music career ==
On November 11, 2007, Dragon Gate Records (a subsidiary of Dragon Gate Wrestling) released a CD featuring music from Nakamura and Eiji Ezaki (Japanese singer and retired wrestler, also known as Hayabusa).

== Championships and accomplishments ==
- Dragon Gate
  - Open the Brave Gate Championship (5 times)
  - Open the Triangle Gate Championship (9 times) – with Ryo Saito and Genki Horiguchi (3), Shingo Takagi and Taku Iwasa (1), Cima and Ricochet (1), K-ness. and Masaaki Mochizuki (1), Big R Shimizu and Masaaki Mochizuki (1), Kenichiro Arai and Ryo Saito (1) and Punch Tominaga and Yamato (1)
  - Open the Twin Gate Championship (4 times) – with Pac (1), K-ness (1), Cima (1), and Naruki Doi (1 time)
  - Open The Triangle Gate Title #1 Contendership Tournament (2014) - with BxB Hulk and Masaaki Mochizuki
  - Summer Tag League (2016) - with Eita
  - Open The Brave Gate Title Tournament (2018)
  - Open the Triangle Gate Titles Tournament (2023) - with Yamato and Punch Tominaga
  - Rey De Parejas (2024)
- Pro Wrestling Illustrated
  - Ranked No. 106 of the top 500 singles wrestlers in the PWI 500 in 2006
- Toryumon Japan
  - El Numero Uno (2004)
  - NWA World Welterweight Championship (1 time)
  - UWA World Trios Championship (3 times) – with Magnum Tokyo and Ryo Saito (1), with Masaaki Mochizuki and Kenichiro Arai (1) and Kenichiro Arai and Second Doi (1) (Note: The UWA Closed in 1995, since then various UWA titles have been used by promotions in Mexico and Japan, this title was promoted by Toryumon Japan at the time Dragon Kid won it.)
- Westside Xtreme Wrestling
  - wXw World Lightweight Championship (1 time)
- Wrestling Observer Newsletter
  - Best Flying Wrestler (2001)
  - Best Wrestling Maneuver (1999, 2000) Dragonrana
  - Match of the Year (2006) with Genki Horiguchi and Ryo Saito vs. CIMA, Naruki Doi and Masato Yoshino (ROH Supercard of Honor, March 31
