= Kenichiro Arai =

Japanese wrestler for Dragon Gate

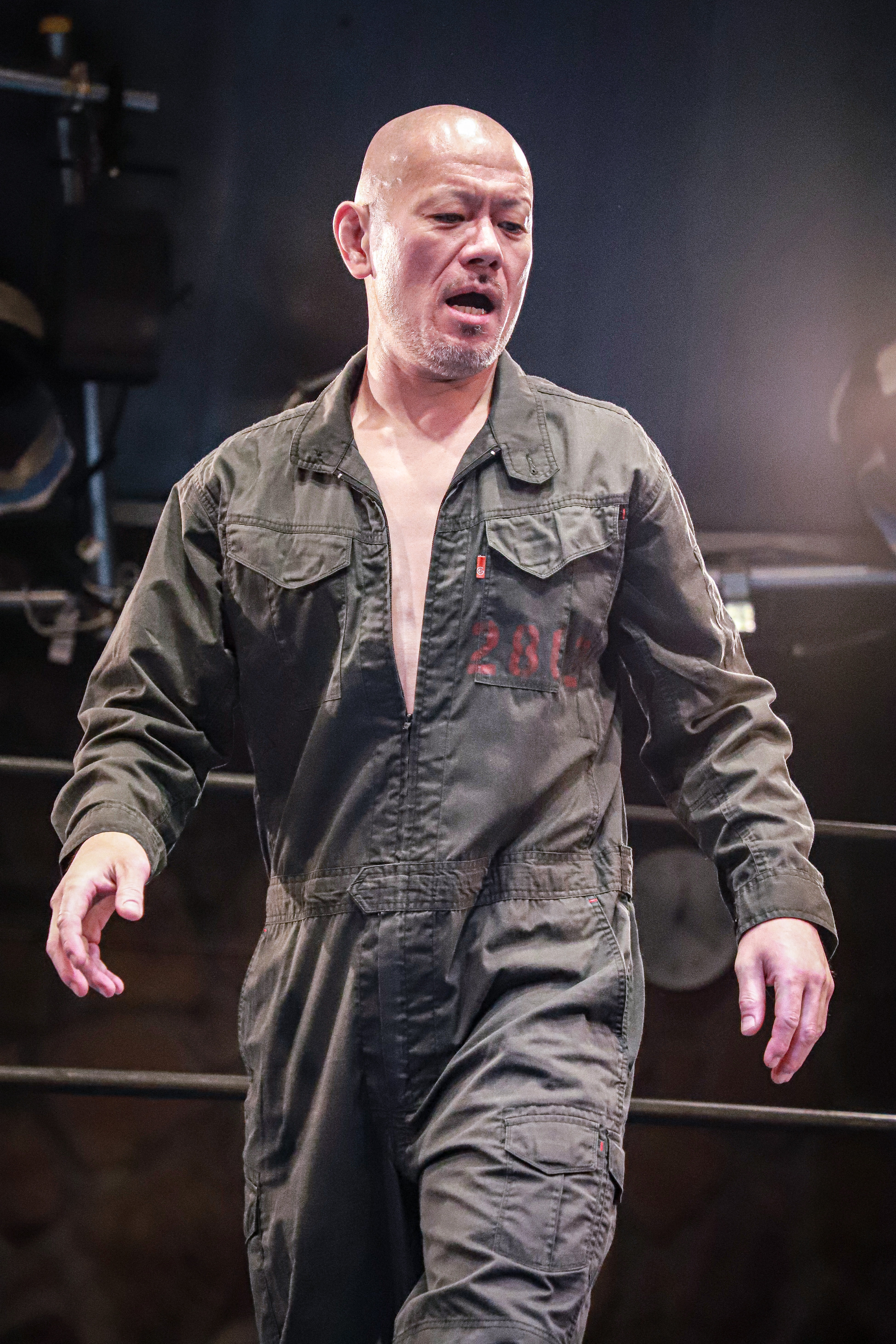
- Arai in July 2023

Personal information
- Born: July 7, 1972 (age 54) Nerima-Ku, Tokyo, Japan

Professional wrestling career
- Ring name(s): Kenichiro Arai; AraKen
- Billed height: 1.75 m (5 ft 9 in)
- Billed weight: 86 kg (190 lb)
- Trained by: Último Dragón; Dos Caras
- Debut: May 13, 1998

Kenichiro Arai (新井 健一郎, Arai Ken'ichirō; born July 7, 1972) is a Japanese professional wrestler best known for his time with the Japanese promotion Dragon Gate.

== Biography ==
Kenichiro Arai, also known as AraKen, is a second term graduate of Último Dragón's Toryumon Japan group, and has been a mainstay on the roster ever since. He participated in FMW before joining Toryumon. He debuted as a heel, but turned face within the year and remained so for over a decade. He is known for his love of the Hanshin Tigers baseball team, and for his very hard head. Arai frequently no-sells attacks to the head when wrestling. Earlier in his career, he played an alcoholic, and would spit beer in his opponent's faces, but this aspect of his character was quietly dropped.

Arai started as a midcarder, but gradually lost card position over the years, until he was fighting mainly in opening matches and rarely winning. However, his career changed for the better when he joined the cram school based stable Tozawa-juku in early 2007. It saw the first ever alteration of his character, and he formed a tag team with Taku Iwasa that gave his career a resurgence. The two won the Open the Twin Gate championship from inaugural champions Naruki Doi and Masato Yoshino on February 8, 2008, successfully retaining the titles twice before dropping them to Ryo Saito and Susumu Yokosuka on May 5. However, he would find championship success again the following month, for on June 28, he – along with Iwasa and newest Tozawa-juku member Shinobu – would capture the Open the Triangle Gate Titles from Shingo Takagi, Yamato and Gamma. Unfortunately for them, they lost the titles in their first defense on July 12, losing them to Yasushi Kanda, Yamato and Gamma.

On November 16, he, Iwasa & Tozawa fought the Triangle Gate champions Masaaki Mochizuki, Don Fujii and Magnitude Kishiwada for the titles, but they had agreed to end Tozawa-juku if they lost. Arai ended up being pinned, bringing the stable to an end, and he and the others were given a graduation ceremony.

On January 18, 2009, Arai shocked everyone when he joined the heel group Real Hazard, turning heel for the first time since 1998. It came about when he came to the ring seemingly to assist Yasushi Kanda from suffering a beatdown from Real Hazard, after he lost a Real Hazard banishment match to Gamma, but instead, he joined the group, and then he joined Kanda and the other group members in beating down and ousting Gamma. He adopted a violent fight style and also re-introduced the alcoholic aspect of his character, carrying large amounts of alcohol bottles to the ring, which he used in his matches.

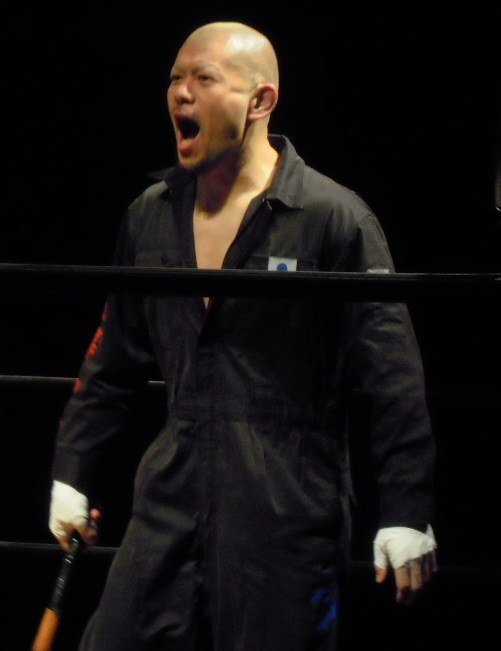
Arai in December 2011

Since joining Real Hazard, Arai's career has been relatively uneventful. He has won matches on a semi-regular basis, usually via a low blow followed by a flash pinfall, but he has not been in title contention. In January 2010, during Real Hazard's disagreement on whether to fight clean matches or continue to cheat, Arai continued to team with the "cheat" side but didn't take a strong position on the issue. When the clean fight side of Genki Horiguchi, Susumu Yokosuka and K-ness left Real Hazard on February 10, Arai stayed with the heels, and with them became one of the founding members of the new Deep Drunkers stable a couple of weeks later.

Since the formation of the Deep Drunkers, Arai has been mostly absent from cards and losing matches in short order when he does appear.

On October 13, 2010, the Deep Drunkers lost a six-man tag team match to World-1 and were as a result forced to split up. However, following the match World-1 member Naruki Doi turned on his stablemates and joined the former Deep Drunkers and Takuya Sugawara to form a new heel group. They however decided that Arai was not needed in the new group and kicked him out.

== Championships and accomplishments ==
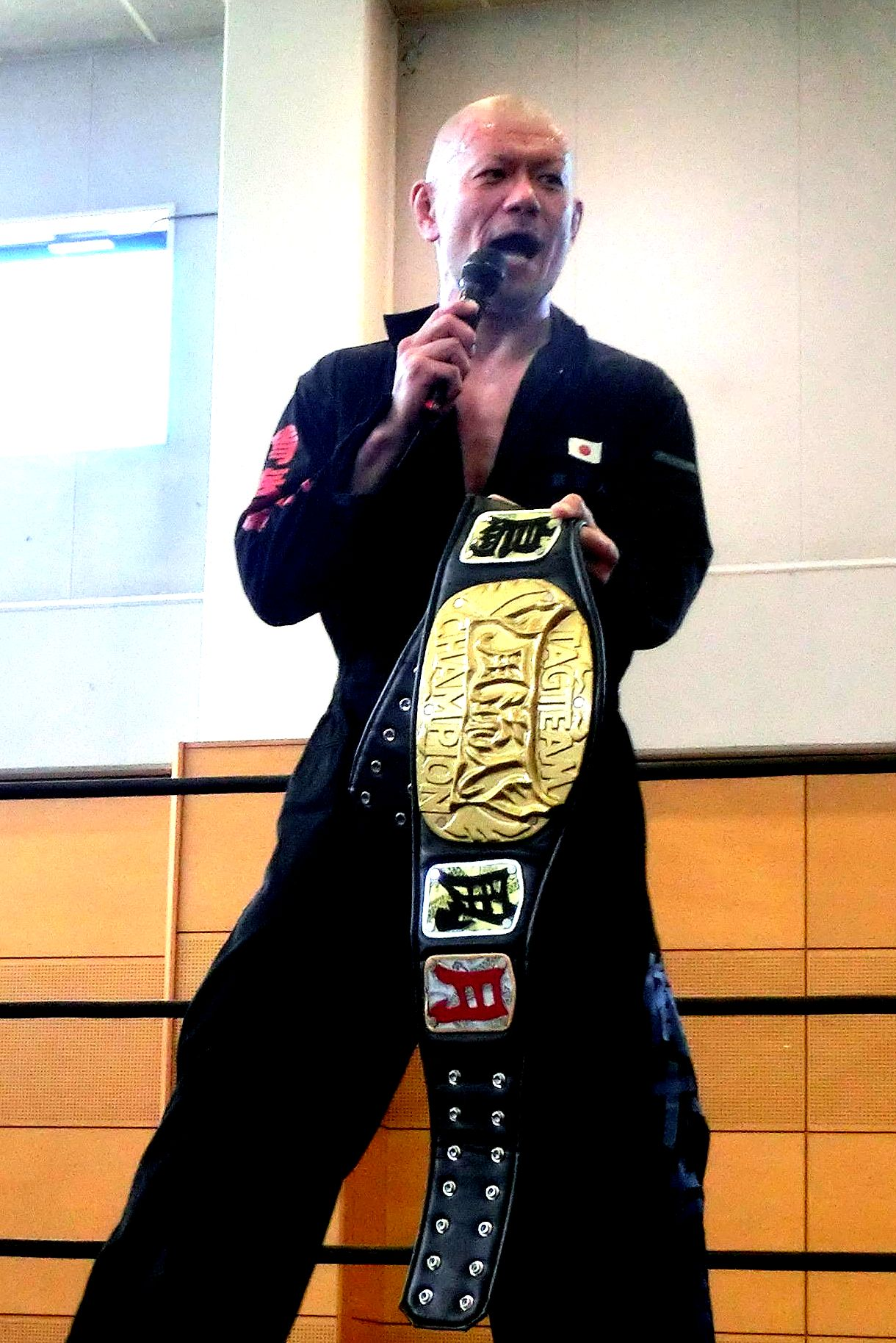
Arai as a Furyujin Tag Team Champion in August 2017

- Asuka Project

- Asuka Project Championship (1 time)

- Dragon Gate

- Dragon Gate I-J Heavyweight Tag Team Championship (1 time) – with Taku Iwasa
- Dragon Gate Open the Owarai Gate Championship (1 time)
- Dragon Gate Open the Triangle Gate Championship (1 time) – with Taku Iwasa and Shinobu
- Dragon Gate Open the Twin Gate Championship (1 time) – with Taku Iwasa

- Fight of the Ring

- UWA Intercontinental Tag Team Championship (1 time) – with The Wolf

- Guts World Pro-Wrestling

- GWC Championship (1 time)
- GWC Tag Team Championship (3 times) – with Shota
- GWC 6-Man Tag Team Championship (2 times) – with Masked Mystery and Ryan Upin (1), Masked Mystery and Shota (1)

- Pro Wrestling Freedoms

- King of Freedom World Tag Team Championship (1 time) – with Gentaro
- UWA World Junior Heavyweight Championship (1 time)

- Mutoha Pro-Wrestling

- Haoh Championship (1 time, current)

- Pro Wrestling Heat-Up

- Heat-Up Universal Tag Team Championship (1 time, current) – with Hide Kubota
- Powerful Tag Tournament (2017) – with Hide Kubota

- Style-E

- Style-E Openweight Championship (1 time)

- Tenryu Project

- Tenryu Project World 6-Man Tag Team Championship (2 times) – with Kohei Sato and Masayuki Kono (1) and Don Fujii and Yasshi (1)

- Theater Puroresu

- Furyujin Tag Team Championship (1 time) – with Kenta Hattori

- Toryumon Japan

- NWA World Welterweight Championship (2 times)
- UWA World Trios Championship (2 times) – with Masaaki Mochizuki and Dragon Kid (1), Dragon Kid and Naruki Doi (1)
