= Navajo Warrior =

American retired professional wrestler (born 1970)

Personal information
- Born: Steve Islas; October 21, 1971 (age 55) Gilbert, Arizona, U.S.

Professional wrestling career
- Ring names: Navajo Warrior; Ghostdancer; Iceman; Jimmy Cruz; Navajo Kid; Shawn Dakota; Steve Greyeyes
- Billed height: 6 ft 2 in (188 cm)
- Billed weight: 266 lb (121 kg)
- Trained by: Steve Gatorwolf
- Debut: 1989
- Retired: November 8, 2025

Steve Islas (born October 21, 1971), better known by the ring name Navajo Warrior, is an American professional wrestling promoter and retired professional wrestler. Islas performed for many different wrestling companies in Arizona, the Southwest United States and the independent circuit. Islas currently is the owner of Impact Zone Wrestling (IZW) since 2000. He also previous wrestled in WWE, National Wrestling Conference (NWC) and Pro Wrestling Zero1 in Japan.

== Professional wrestling career ==
Trained by Steve Gatorwolf, Islas made his wrestling debut in 1989 in Arizona. He won his first title in 1990 when he defeated his trianer, Steve Gatorwolf for the AWF (Arizona) Heavyweight title.

Islas worked for the WWF as Shawn Dakota from 1993 to 1996 losing to Razor Ramon, Yokozuna, Owen Hart, Vader, Headshrinkers, and The Smokin' Gunns.

Islas worked for the National Wrestling Conference in Las Vegas as The Navajo Kid from 1995 to 1998.

In 2000, Islas had a feud with a young John Cena who was then known as the Prototype in Arizona, California, Utah and New Mexico.

In the early 2000s, Islas began teaming with Ghostwalker as "Native Blood". On September 1, 2000, they defeated The Corporate Stooges (Jonnie Stewart & Tony DeNucci) in Gallup, New Mexico to win the AWA Superstars World Tag Team Championship. Native Blood held the belts for over three years until Ghostwalker turned on Navajo Warrior. Ghostwalker aligned himself with Charming Chad, as Model's Inc., and subsequently changed his name to G.Q. Gallo. In a match to decide new champions, Navajo Warrior teamed with Evan Karagias in a losing effort against Model's Inc. on March 26, 2004.

From 2000 to 2005, Navajo worked for Ultimate Pro Wrestling in Southern California. He was the UPW Internet Champion when he defeated Billy D on December 20, 2000. He dropped the title to The Blue Meanie on March 14, 2001.

In 2002, Navajo made his debut in Japan for Pro Wrestling Zero1.

From 2005 to 2007, Islas worked for the WWE where he fought against Chris Benoit, Jim Duggan, Eugene, Big Daddy V and the Highlanders.

Islas and Ghostwalker eventually reunited in Impact Zone Wrestling and twice won the IZW Tag Team Championship. On January 5, 2008, they defeated NWA Arizona Tag Team Champions The 602 Wrecking Crew (Jacob Herzberg & Marty Murphy) to unify the titles. Around this time, Native Blood formed a brief alliance in World Pro Wrestling with Tatanka against then WPW Heavyweight Champion "Golden Boy" Jerry Grey and WPW Tag Team Champions Heinrich Volkoff and Gino Santana.

Navajo Warrior later formed a successful tag team with John Williams (The Hawaiian Lion / Shooting Wolf) as both "Native Warriors" and "The Tribe". On July 10, 2011, The Tribe beat Natural Selection (Brian Cage and Shaun Ricker) for the CWFH Heritage Tag Team Championship in Los Angeles, California. They defended the belts throughout the Southwestern United States for nearly two years before losing the belts to Los Banditos (Rico Dynamite and Tito Escondido) in Glendale, California on February 10, 2013. At the time, they were the longest-reigning champions in the promotion's history.

After a 35-year career, Islas announced his retirement from pro wrestling with the "Last Mile Tour". His final match took place on November 8, 2025 when he lost to Samoa Joe in Impact Zone Wrestling.

== Championships and accomplishments ==
- All Star Wrestling Alliance
  - ASWA Heavyweight Championship (1 time)
- AWA Superstars
  - AWA Superstars World Tag Team Championship (1 time) – with Ghostwalker
- American Wrestling Federation
  - AWF Heavyweight Championship (8 times)
- Championship Wrestling from Hollywood
  - CWFH Heritage Tag Team Championship (1 time) – with The Hawaiian Lion
- Dragon's Den
  - Dragon's Den Championship (1 time)
- Florida Championship Wrestling / Native American Wrestling Federation
  - FCW/NAWF Tag Team Championship (1 time) – with Ghostwalker
- Impact Wrestling Federation
  - IWF Heavyweight Championship (1 time)
- Impact Zone Wrestling
  - IZW Heavyweight Championship (2 times)
  - IZW Tag Team Championship (2 times) – with The Hawaiian Lion and Ghostwalker
- International Championship Wrestling
  - ICW Tag Team Championship (1 time) – with Shooting Wolf
- NWA Arizona
  - NWA Arizona Tag Team Championship – with Ghostwalker (1 time)
- National Wrestling Federation
  - NWF Tag Team Championship (1 time) – with Jules Strongbow
- Rage in the Cage Wrestling
  - Rage in the Cage Wrestling Championship (1 time)
- Pro Wrestling Illustrated
  - PWI ranked him # 482 of the 500 best singles wrestlers of the PWI 500 in 1997
  - PWI ranked him # 351 of the 500 best singles wrestlers of the PWI 500 in 2002
  - PWI ranked him # 344 of the 500 best singles wrestlers of the PWI 500 in 2003
  - PWI ranked him # 375 of the 500 best singles wrestlers of the PWI 500 in 2007
  - PWI ranked him # 384 of the 500 best singles wrestlers of the PWI 500 in 2008
  - PWI ranked him # 479 of the 500 best singles wrestlers of the PWI 500 in 2009
- Ultimate Pro Wrestling
  - UPW Internet Championship (1 time)
- Venue Wrestling Entertainment
  - VWE Tag Team Championship (1 time) – with The Hawaiian Lion
- Western Alliance Entertainment
  - WAE Inter-Tribal Championship (1 time)
- World Pro Wrestling
  - WPW American Heavyweight Championship (1 time)
  - WPW Tag Team Championship (1 time) – with Shawn Riddik
- Western States Wrestling
  - WSW Tag Team Championship (1 time) – with Ghostwalker
