= Drew Gulak =

American professional wrestler (born 1987)

- Gulak in September 2026

Personal information
- Born: April 28, 1987 (age 39) Abington Township, Pennsylvania, U.S.
- Website: drewgulak.com

Professional wrestling career
- Ring name(s): Drew Gulak; Gulak; Soldier Ant; The Gobbledy Gooker
- Billed height: 6 ft 1 in (185 cm)
- Billed weight: 193 lb (88 kg)
- Billed from: Philadelphia, Pennsylvania
- Trained by: Chris Hero; Mike Quackenbush; Skayde
- Debut: April 16, 2005

Drew Gulak (born April 28, 1987) is an American professional wrestler currently performing on the independent circuit. He is best known for his tenure in WWE, where he was a former one-time WWE Cruiserweight Champion and eight-time WWE 24/7 Champion.

Before signing with WWE, Gulak worked for 10 years on several independent promotions. With his real name, he worked for Combat Zone Wrestling, where he became a Triple Crown Champion. In Evolve, he won the Tag Team Championship. He also worked for Chikara with the name Soldier Ant, where he won the Campeonatos de Parejas, the King of Trios tourney in 2011 and the Tag World Grand Prix in 2008.

In 2016, Gulak participated into the Cruiserweight Classic, a tournament hosted by WWE featuring cruiserweight independent wrestlers. Although he didn't win the tournament, Gulak signed with WWE and worked for them until 2024. He won the WWE Cruiserweight Championship once and the WWE 24/7 Championship eight times. In 2024, after an allegation made by Ronda Rousey, Gulak departed WWE as his contract would not be renewed.

== Professional wrestling career ==
=== Combat Zone Wrestling (2005–2016) ===
Prior to becoming a wrestler, he was a user on Newgrounds who would occasionally make forum posts talking about his interest in WWE and pro-wrestling in general. Gulak began training for a career in professional wrestling in 2004 at the Combat Zone Wrestling (CZW) Wrestling Academy and the Chikara Wrestle Factory. He made his debut for CZW on September 10, 2005, at Down With The Sickness 4-Ever, a tribute show to Chris Cash, winning a battle royal. Gulak was quickly paired up with fellow CZW Wrestling Academy alumnus Andy Sumner and, known as Team AnDrew, the duo captured the CZW World Tag Team Championship twice before disbanding in 2009.

Gulak moved into singles competition following the dissolution of the team, and in early 2010, he won the CZW Wired TV Championship by defeating Tyler Veritas at a television taping at Swinging for the Fences. Gulak held the title for 429 days, defeating wrestlers including Nick Gage, Zack Sabre Jr., Rich Swann, and Sumner. During his reign as the Wired TV Champion, Gulak began to characterize himself as a political leader and activist within CZW, speaking out against ethical issues of violence, including CZW's famed ultraviolence and the frequent manhandling of company referees, specifically targeting the actions of long-time fan favorite Nick Gage. Gage was legitimately arrested in late 2010 for bank robbery, and Gulak worked it into storylines by mocking Gage and associating himself with Gage's former manager Dewey Donovan. He also continued to speak out against violence and mismanagement within CZW. This drew the ire of several roster members such as former training partner Danny Havoc, Jon Moxley, and Devon Moore, who began interrupting Gulak's presentations and attacking him. In response, Gulak hired Nui Tofiga for protection. On June 11, 2011, Gulak lost the Wired TV Championship to A. R. Fox at Prelude to Violence 2. Gulak then began expanding his "Campaign for a better Combat Zone" by recruiting Alexander James as his intern and Kimber Lee as an activist for women's rights in professional wrestling.

At Tangled Web 6 on August 10, 2013, Gulak defeated Masada to win the CZW World Heavyweight Championship. At Proving Grounds in May 2014, Gulak lost the title to Biff Busick.

=== Independent circuit (2013–2016) ===
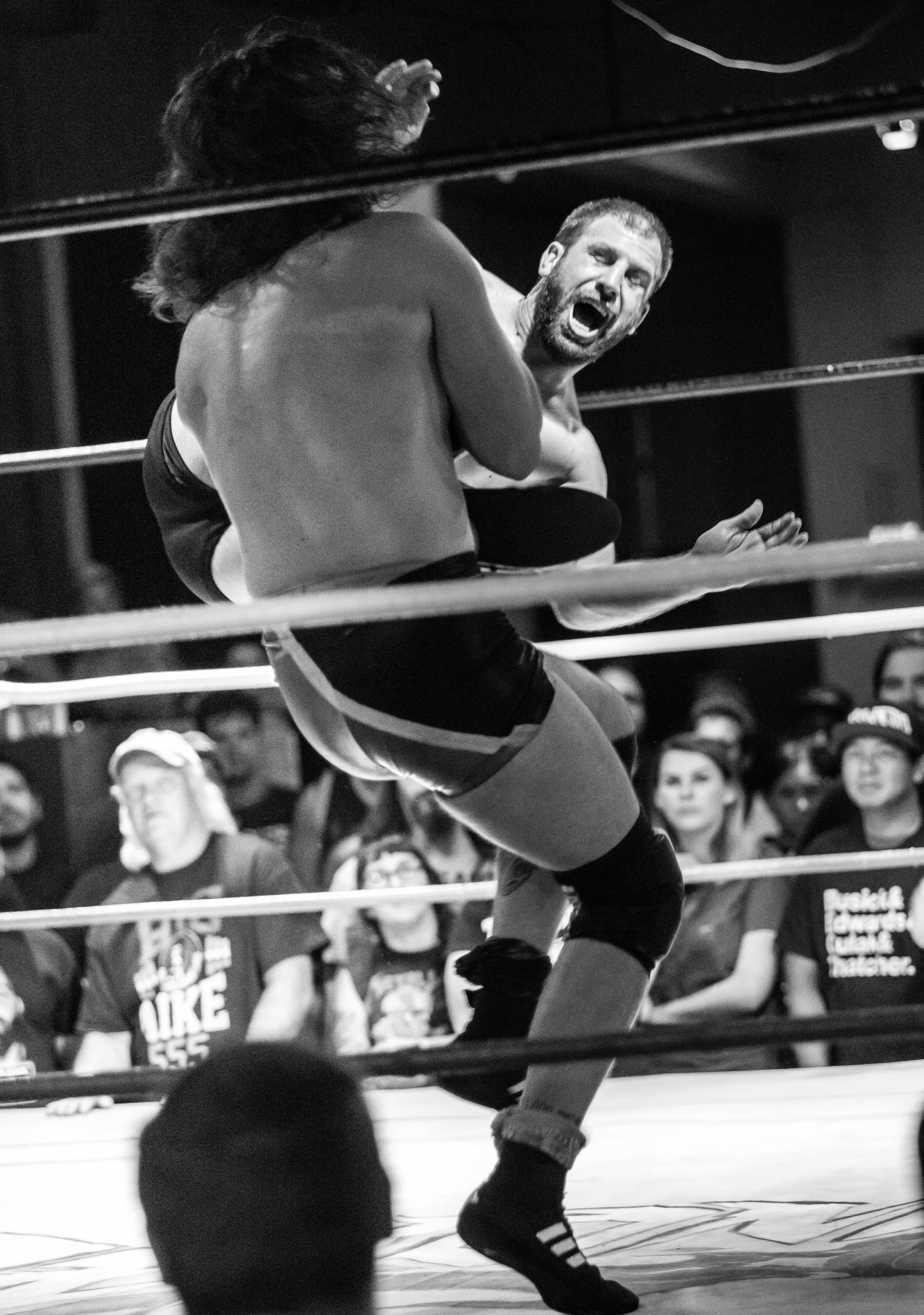
Gulak wrestling Dave Cole

Aside from CZW, Gulak has also worked for Beyond Wrestling, Dragon Gate USA, Evolve, and Inter Species Wrestling. In 2013, he won the Style Battle tournament for Evolve and later participated in the 2014 edition. In August 2014, Gulak made his debut for Pro Wrestling Guerrilla, participating in their annual Battle of Los Angeles event. Gulak has participated in Chikara's annual King of Trios tournament multiple times; in 2008, he teamed with Andy Sumner and Tim Donst, in 2014, he competed alongside Chuck Taylor and the Swamp Monster, and in 2016, he was part of Team #CWC, alongside Cedric Alexander and Johnny Gargano. When competing as Drew Gulak, his team failed to progress from the first round every time. However, as Soldier Ant, his team, The Colony, won the 2011 edition of the tournament.

Gulak has also competed internationally. In June 2016, Gulak traveled to the Channel Islands to make his debut for Channel Island World Wrestling.

=== WWE (2016–2024) ===
==== No-Fly Zone (2016–2018) ====
On May 7, 2016, Gulak defeated Tracy Williams at Evolve 61 to qualify for WWE's upcoming Cruiserweight Classic tournament. The tournament began on June 23, with Gulak defeating Harv Sihra in his first round match. On July 14, Gulak was eliminated from the tournament by Zack Sabre Jr. Gulak appeared on September 14 episode of NXT, losing to Hideo Itami. On September 26 episode of Raw, Gulak made his main roster debut, teaming with Lince Dorado in a losing effort to Cedric Alexander and Rich Swann. On the Hell in a Cell pre-show, Gulak established himself as a heel, teaming up with Tony Nese and Ariya Daivari in a losing effort to Cedric Alexander, Lince Dorado, and Sin Cara. On the Survivor Series pre-show, Gulak, Tony Nese, and Ariya Daivari lost to T.J. Perkins, Rich Swann, and Noam Dar. In December, it was confirmed that Gulak had signed with WWE. On January 2, 2017, episode of Raw, Gulak won his first match on the main roster against Cedric Alexander.

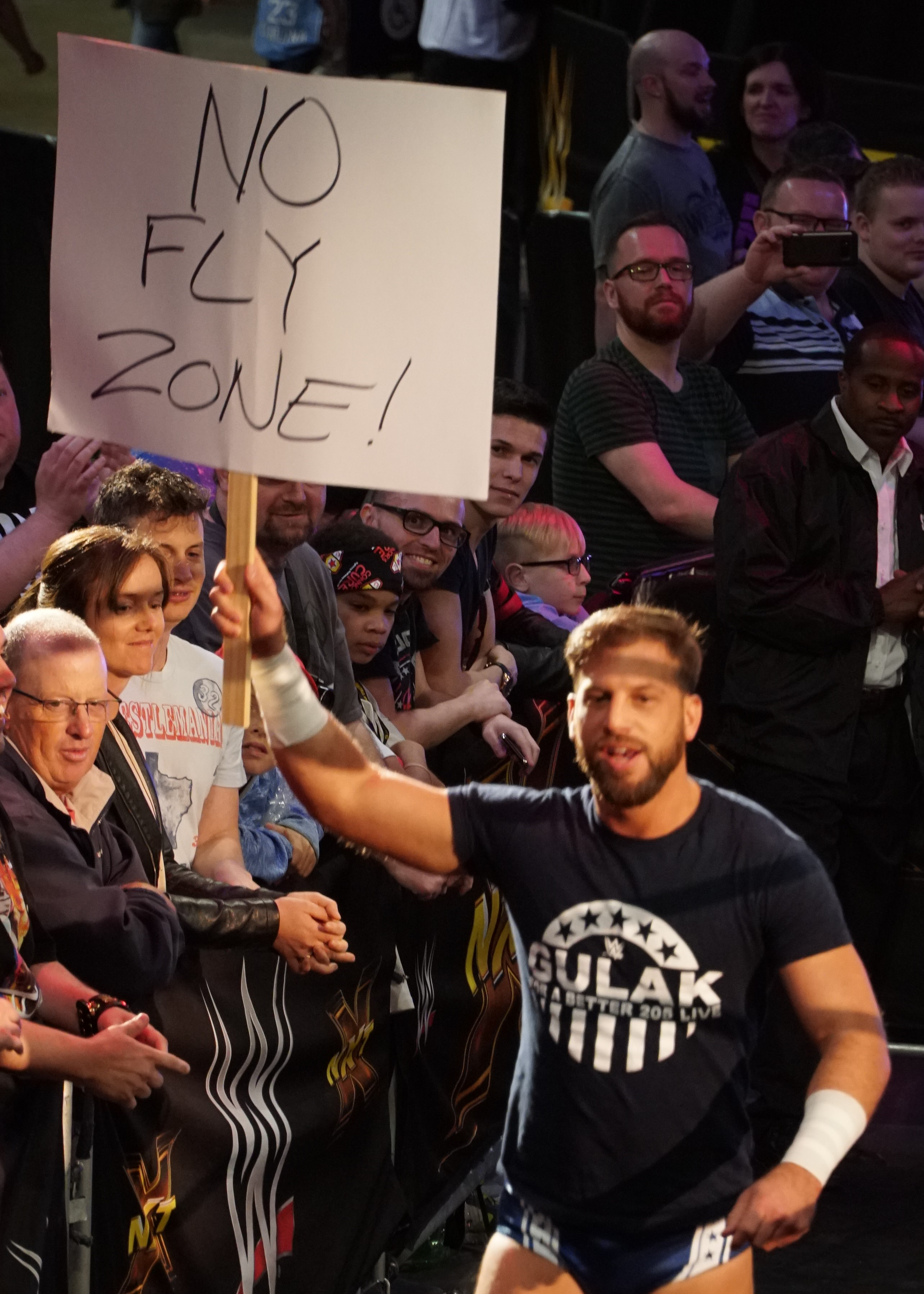
Gulak campaigning for a "No-Fly Zone"

In 2017, Gulak introduced a new gimmick in WWE, beginning to campaign for a "Better 205 Live", in a nod to his previous character in CZW. The campaign included Gulak asking Mustafa Ali to use a more conservative in-ring style as part of a "No-Fly Zone" campaign. This prompted a feud between the two, which ended on July 18 episode of 205 Live, when Gulak lost to Ali in a two out of three falls match. As part of his gimmick, he began incorporating his own PowerPoint Presentations every week on his plans for a better 205 Live. Gulak went on to feud with Akira Tozawa about his war cry chanting. On October 10 episode of 205 Live, Gulak attacked Tozawa on the ramp and later injured his voice box. Tozawa gained revenge on Gulak, which led to a match on October 31 episode of 205 Live, which Tozawa won. Gulak had aligned with Enzo Amore and became a member of Amore's faction "The Zo Train", while continuing his rivalry with Tozawa. On November 21 episode of 205 Live, Gulak lost to Tozawa in a Street Fight, ending their feud. On December 4 episode of Raw, Gulak won a fatal four-way match to face Rich Swann the following week, with the winner earning a match against Enzo Amore for the WWE Cruiserweight Championship. However, Swann was suspended prior to the match and replaced with Cedric Alexander. On December 18 episode of Raw, Gulak lost to Cedric Alexander, making him unable to face Amore for the WWE Cruiserweight Championship. On January 23, 2018, Amore was fired from WWE and "Zo Train" was quietly disbanded.

==== Cruiserweight Champion (2018–2019) ====
In February 2018, Gulak was entered into a 16-man single elimination tournament to determine a new WWE Cruiserweight Champion, with the final round set to occur at WrestleMania 34. Gulak defeated both Tony Nese and Mark Andrews via submission en route to the semi-finals, where he lost to Mustafa Ali. During this time, Gulak stopped the PowerPoint Presentations and his "No-Fly Zone" campaign for a better 205 Live, and developed a new character with aspirations to be the best submission specialist in WWE. Around this time, Gulak formed an alliance with Gentleman Jack Gallagher and The Brian Kendrick to feud with Lucha House Party (Kalisto, Gran Metalik, and Lince Dorado), with the two teams trading victories, including a six-man tag team elimination match, which Gulak won for his team. On July 24 episode of 205 Live, Gulak won a fatal four-way match also involving Mustafa Ali, Hideo Itami and TJP to become the number one contender to the WWE Cruiserweight Championship. Gulak challenged Cedric Alexander for the Cruiserweight Championship at SummerSlam and on September 19 episode of 205 Live, where he was unsuccessful both times.

Following April, Gulak was taken off television and returned without elements of his previous gimmick, such as doing campaign slogans and PowerPoint presentations. At Stomping Grounds, he won the Cruiserweight Championship. Gulak then defeated Nese at Extreme Rules in a rematch for the title. At SummerSlam, Gulak successfully defended his title against Oney Lorcan after using underhanded tactics. Two days later on 205 Live, Gulak again retained his title against Lorcan by submission. At Clash of the Champions, Gulak retained the Cruiserweight Championship in a triple threat match against Lince Dorado and Humberto Carrillo. Gulak lost the renamed NXT Cruiserweight Championship to Lio Rush on October 9 episode of NXT, ending his reign at 108 days.

==== Alliance with Daniel Bryan (2019–2020) ====
As part of the 2019 draft, Gulak was drafted to the SmackDown brand. Gulak, once again doing his campaigning gimmick, made his debut on October 18 episode of SmackDown where he attempted to show Braun Strowman a PowerPoint Presentation on how to beat Tyson Fury, but was quickly defeated by Strowman. The following week, he would attempt to show a PowerPoint Presentation on how Braun Strowman can lose to Tyson Fury before his match with Kalisto, but he was once again attacked by Strowman. On November 15 episode of SmackDown, Gulak along with The B-Team (Curtis Axel and Bo Dallas) would taunt Strowman for his loss against Tyson Fury, but Strowman would attack all three men.

On February 21, 2020, episode of SmackDown, Gulak began a feud with Daniel Bryan after claiming to have "found holes in his game" and placed him in matches against opponents such as Heath Slater and Curtis Axel to test his weaknesses but Bryan came out victorious. On March 6 episode of SmackDown, Bryan challenged Gulak to a match at Elimination Chamber, which Gulak lost.

On March 13 episode of SmackDown, Gulak formed an alliance with Daniel Bryan after both men gained mutual respect for each other, turning face. He subsequently managed Bryan during his match against Cesaro, where both were subsequently attacked by Cesaro, Shinsuke Nakamura, and Sami Zayn. The following week, Gulak and Bryan teamed up to defeat Cesaro and Nakamura in a tag-team match. On March 27 episode of SmackDown, Gulak defeated Nakamura to earn Bryan an Intercontinental Championship match against Zayn at WrestleMania 36. During the first night of WrestleMania on April 4, Gulak was defeated by Cesaro on the pre-show while Bryan was unsuccessful in winning the Intercontinental Championship from Zayn on the main card. On May 15 episode of SmackDown, Gulak competed in a tournament for the vacant Intercontinental Championship, but was eliminated by Bryan in the first round. After this match, the following day, Gulak's contract with WWE expired.

==== 24/7 Champion (2020–2022) ====
On May 25, 2020, it was reported that Gulak was re-signed by WWE, and his profile on WWE.com was moved back to the SmackDown roster page. On May 29 episode of SmackDown, Gulak participated in his first match back for WWE, a 10-man battle royal for a spot in the WWE Intercontinental Championship tournament but was eliminated by King Corbin. On June 5 episode of SmackDown, Gulak defeated AJ Styles with a bridging folding press. This earned him an Intercontinental Championship match against Styles on July 3 episode of SmackDown where he was unsuccessful in capturing the title. On July 17, Gulak served as a guest commentator on 205 Live alongside Vic Joseph where he continued to provide commentary for the show until the return of Nigel McGuinness. At Clash of Champions, Gulak pinned R-Truth to become the WWE 24/7 Champion for the first time. He would lose the title back to Truth later on in the night.

As part of the 2020 Draft in October, Gulak was drafted to the Raw brand. Over the following months, he kept on chasing after the 24/7 Championship, mainly feuding with R-Truth and Akira Tozawa and capturing it on several occasions also turning into a tweener in the process. During the Survivor Series kickoff show, Gulak won the title for the seventh time as the Gobbledy Gooker, a comedic character original portrayed by Héctor Guerrero at the 1990 Survivor Series event; this reign is recognized by WWE as a reign for the Gobbledy Gooker, but not for Gulak. On the January 11 episode of Raw, Gulak would face AJ Styles for a chance to qualify for the 2021 Royal Rumble but was unsuccessful. Following this, Gulak would wrestle mainly on Main Event. As part of the 2021 Draft, Gulak was drafted to the SmackDown brand. On the April 15, 2022 episode of SmackDown, Gulak became a backstage interviewer for the brand, however, he reverted to his wrestler persona a few weeks later.

==== No Quarter Catch Crew and departure (2022–2024) ====
In December 2022, Gulak returned to the NXT brand, where he played the role of Hank Walker's mentor. On February 14, 2023, episode of NXT, Gulak turned on Walker and aligned with Charlie Dempsey, creating the No Quarter Catch Crew stable with Dempsey, Damon Kemp, and Myles Borne, turning heel. On the February 27, 2024 episode of NXT, Dempsey defeated Noam Dar 2–1 under British Rounds Rules for the NXT Heritage Cup. A week later at NXT: Roadblock, NQCC announced that the NXT Heritage Cup will be defended by the whole stable under the "Catch Clause". The Catch Clause was invoked on the March 19 episode of NXT, with Gulak defeating Riley Osborne 2–1 to successfully defend the Cup in his final appearance in WWE. In April, Ronda Rousey made allegations that Gulak grabbed her pants' drawstrings backstage in 2022. While Gulak stated that it was an accident, he was removed from television and an internal investigation was conducted by WWE. Gulak departed from WWE weeks later, ending his 8-year tenure with the company. Both Chief content officer Paul "Triple H" Levesque and Senior Vice President of Talent Development Creative Shawn Michaels explained that his contract had expired and was not being renewed. The investigation included allegations of his bad behavior backstage with other wrestlers, as he was described as a "bully".

=== Return to independent circuit (2024–present) ===
After leaving WWE, Gulak began to work for the independent promotion Beyond Wrestling. During his time there, he was included in a controversial storyline that referred to his incident with Ronda Rousey, asking Masha Slamovich during an in-ring promo "Did you feel I was a danger in the locker room?".

== Other media ==
Gulak made his video game debut as a playable character in WWE 2K19, and subsequently in WWE 2K20, WWE 2K22, WWE 2K23, and WWE 2K24.

== Personal life ==
Gulak is Jewish. He is an alumnus of Northeast High School, having grown up in the city of Philadelphia, and attended Drexel University. Gulak was a close friend of the late wrestler Danny Havoc, who he paid tribute to after Havoc's death during his Intercontinental Championship match against AJ Styles.

== Championships and accomplishments ==
- Beyond Wrestling
  - Tournament For Tomorrow 3:16 (2014) – with Biff Busick
- Championship Wrestling from Hollywood
  - CWFH Heritage Tag Team Championship (1 time) – with Timothy Thatcher
- Chikara
  - Campeonatos de Parejas (1 time) – with Fire Ant
  - King of Trios (2011) – with Fire Ant and Green Ant
  - Tag World Grand Prix (2008) – with Fire Ant
  - Torneo Cibernetico (2014)
- Combat Zone Wrestling
  - CZW World Heavyweight Championship (1 time)
  - CZW Wired TV Championship (1 time)
  - CZW World Tag Team Championship (2 times) – with Andy Sumner
  - Chris Cash Memorial Battle Royal (2005)
  - Fifth Triple Crown Champion
- DDT Pro-Wrestling
  - Ironman Heavymetalweight Championship (1 time)
- Eastern Wrestling Alliance
  - EWA Cruiserweight Championship (1 time)
  - EWA Tag Team Championships (1 time) – with Andy Sumner
- Evolve
  - Evolve Tag Team Championship (1 time) – with Tracy Williams
  - Style Battle Tournament (2013)
- New York Wrestling Connection
  - NYWC Trios Championship (1 time) – with Electro Ant and Ultimo Ant
  - Master of the Mat (2014)
- Pro Wrestling Illustrated
  - Ranked No. 60 of the top 500 singles wrestlers in the PWI 500 in 2020
- United Wrestling Network
  - UWN Tag Team Championship (1 time, inaugural) – with Timothy Thatcher
- WWE
  - WWE 24/7 Championship (8 times) (Note: Gulak won the title once under The Gobbledy Gooker character. WWE does not recognize this as Gulak's seventh reign.)
  - WWE Cruiserweight Championship (1 time)
  - Slammy Award (1 time)
    - Most Creative 24/7 Pin of the Year (2020) Dressed as a janitor on Raw (October 5)

=== Luchas de Apuestas record ===
Winner (wager)	Loser (wager)	Location	Event	Date	Notes
Fire Ant and Soldier Ant (masks)	Chuck Taylor and Icarus (hairs)	Philadelphia, Pennsylvania	Aniversario Yang	May 24, 2009	

== See also ==
- List of Jewish professional wrestlers
