= UWN Tag Team Championship =

Professional wrestling tag team championship

UWN World Tag Team Championship

Details
- Promotion: Championship Wrestling (United Wrestling Network)
- Date established: December 6, 2015
- Current champions: 5150 (Danny Limelight and Slice Boogie)
- Date won: September 23, 2025 (aired September 28, 2025)
Statistics
- First champions: TAG (Drew Gulak and Timothy Thatcher)
- Longest reign: TMZ (Shane Haste, Bad Dude Tito, and Che Cabrera) (931 days)
- Shortest reign: TAG (Drew Gulak and Timothy Thatcher) (<1 day)

The UWN Tag Team Championship is a tag team championship sanctioned and governed by the United Wrestling Network and established in Championship Wrestling (formally Championship Wrestling from Hollywood, or CWFH).

== Title history ==
It was awarded to Timothy Thatcher and Drew Gulak as they were the reigning CWFH Heritage Tag Team Champions.

The current champions are 5150 (Danny Limelight and Slice Boogie), who are in their second reign as champions.

=== Reigns ===
Key
No.	Overall reign number
Reign	Reign number for the specific champion
Days	Number of days held
<1	Reign lasted less than a day
+	Current reign is changing daily

No.	Champion	Championship change			Reign statistics		Notes	Ref.
No.	Champion	Date	Event	Location	Reign	Days	Notes	Ref.
1	TAG (Drew Gulak and Timothy Thatcher)	December 6, 2015	N/A	Port Hueneme, CA	1	<1	Gulak and Thatcher were awarded the UWN Tag Team Championship as they were the reigning CWFH Heritage Tag Team Champions.	
2	Cold Cold World (Damien Grundy and Will Rood)	December 6, 2015	N/A	Port Hueneme, CA	1	126		
3	The Friendship Express (The Hobo and Jervis Cottonbelly)	April 10, 2016	Coastline Clash	Port Hueneme, CA	1	378		
4	Eric Watts	November 13, 2016	N/A	N/A	1	161	Watts became champion after utilizing Percy's Privilege (which he stole from an injured Rocky Romero) for a championship opportunity against Friendship Express after they had successfully defended the championship against The Classic Connection. Though Watts won the titles himself, UWN often mandated Ty Matthews defend the championship with him.	
5	Pac 3 (Dan Joseph and Dylan Bostic)	April 23, 2017	Coastline Clash	Port Hueneme, CA	1	224	Pac 3 defeated Classic Connection (Buddy Royal and Levi Shapiro), Spirit and The Stars (Astro Viajero and Espiritu), and Eric Watts and Ty Matthews in a four-way tag team elimination match.	
6	Reno Scum (Adam Thornstowe and Luster the Legend)	December 3, 2017	Milestone	Port Hueneme, CA	1	399		
7	RockNES Monsters (Johnny Yuma and Kevin Martenson)	January 6, 2019	N/A	Port Hueneme, CA	1	49		
8	Double Platinum (Chris Bey and Suede Thompson)	February 24, 2019	CWFH TV Taping	Port Hueneme, CA	1	28		
9	Reno Scum (Adam Thornstowe and Luster the Legend)	March 24, 2019	N/A	Port Hueneme, CA	2	126		
10	The Soul Burners (Ryan Taylor and Tomaste)	July 28, 2019	N/A	Port Hueneme, CA	1	211		
11	SoCal Distancing (Adrian Quest and Andy Brown)	February 24, 2020	CWFH Episode #456	Port Hueneme, CA	1	294		
12	The Bodega (Danny Rivera, Papo Esco, and Slice Boogie)	December 14, 2020	CWFH Episode #498	Port Hueneme, CA	1	356	Rivera and Esco won the belts before Slice joined them on January 16. The Bodega would later defend the titles under the Freebird Rule.	
13	The Midnight Heat (Eddie Pearl and Ricky Gibson)	December 5, 2021	CWFH	Commerce, CA	1	137	Defeated Rivera and Boogie, who represented The Bodega	
14	Beef Candy (Richie Slade and Flex McCallion)	April 21, 2022	Championship Wrestling presented by CarShield	Commerce, CA	1	110	This was a three-way tag team match also involving The Wolf Zaddies (Che Cabrera and Bad Dude Tito). It aired on tape delay on May 29.	
15	The Midnight Heat (Eddie Pearl and Ricky Gibson)	August 9, 2022	Golden Opportunity	Irvine, CA	2	70	Aired on tape delay on August 28.	
16	Reno Scum (Adam Thornstowe and Luster the Legend)	October 18, 2022	Championship Wrestling presented by CarSheild	Irvine, CA	3	88	Guy Tweakacetti filled in for Ricky Gibson, who was injured. It aired on tape delay November 6.	
17	The Midnight Heat (Eddie Pearl and Ricky Gibson)	January 15, 2023	Red Carpet Rumble	Mesa, AZ	3	51		
18	TMZ (Shane Haste, Bad Dude Tito, and Che Cabrera)	March 7, 2023	Championship Wrestling presented by CarShield	Irvine, CA	1	931	Haste and Tito won the belts, though Cabrera is also recognized as champion under the Freebird Rule.	
19	5150 (Danny Limelight and Slice Boogie)	September 23, 2025	Championship Wrestling presented by CarShield	Oxnard, CA	2	59+	Defeated Haste and Cabrera, who represented TMZ. Limelight and Boogie previously held the titles with Papo Esco as The Bodega, with Limelight previously known as simply Danny Rivera.	

== Combined reigns ==
As of November 21, 2025.

†	Indicates the current champions
<1	Indicates reign was less than a day

=== By team ===
Rank	Team	No. of reigns	Combined days
1	TMZ (Shane Haste, Bad Dude Tito, and Che Cabrera)	1	931
2	Reno Scum (Adam Thornstowe and Luster the Legend)	3	613
3	The Friendship Express (The Hobo and Jervis Cottonbelly)	1	378
4	The Bodega (Danny Rivera, Papo Esco, and Slice Boogie)	1	356
5	SoCal Distancing (Adrian Quest and Andy Brown)	1	294
6	The Midnight Heat (Eddie Pearl and Ricky Gibson)	3	258
7	Pac 3 (Dan Joseph and Dylan Bostic)	1	224
8	The Soul Burners (Ryan Taylor and Tomaste)	1	211
9	Eric Watts	1	161
10	Cold Cold World (Damien Grundy and Will Rood)	1	126
11	Beef Candy (Richie Slade and Flex McCallion)	1	110
12	5150 † (Danny Limelight and Slice Boogie)	1	59+
13	RockNES Monsters (Johnny Yuma and Kevin Martenson)	1	49
14	Double Platinum (Chris Bey and Suede Thompson)	1	28
15	TAG (Drew Gulak and Timothy Thatcher)	1	<1

=== By wrestler ===
Rank	Wrestler	No. of reigns	Combined days
1	Shane Haste	1	931
1	Bad Dude Tito	1	931
1	Che Cabrera	1	931
4	Adam Thornstowe	3	613
4	Luster the Legend	3	613
6	Danny Rivera / Danny Limelight †	2	416+
6	Slice Boogie †	2	416+
8	The Hobo	1	378
8	Jervis Cottonbelly	1	378
10	Papo Esco	1	356
11	Adrian Quest	1	294
11	Andy Brown	1	294
13	Eddie Pearl	3	258
13	Ricky Gibson	3	258
15	Dan Joseph	1	224
15	Dylan Bostic	1	224
17	Ryan Taylor	1	211
17	Tomaste	1	211
19	Eric Watts	1	161
20	Damien Grundy	1	126
20	Will Rood	1	126
22	Richie Slade	1	110
22	Flex McCallion	1	110
24	Johnny Yuma	1	49
24	Kevin Martenson	1	49
26	Chris Bey	1	28
26	Suede Thompson	1	28
28	Drew Gulak	1	<1
28	Timothy Thatcher	1	<1

== See also ==
- CWFH Heritage Tag Team Championship
