= CWFH Heritage Tag Team Championship =

Professional wrestling tag team championship

Details
- Promotion: Championship Wrestling from Hollywood
- Date established: January 29, 2010

Other names
- M1W Tag Team Championship; NWA Heritage Tag Team Championship; CWFH Heritage Tag Team Championship
Statistics
- First champions: Natural Selection (Brian Cage and Shaun Ricker)
- Most reigns: RockNES Monsters (Johnny Goodtime and Johnny Yuma) (3 times)
- Longest reign: The Tribe (Hawaiian Lion and Navajo Warrior) (581 days)
- Shortest reign: PPRay (Peter Avalon and Ray Rosas) (12 days)

The CWFH Heritage Tag Team Championship was a tag team championship controlled by Championship Wrestling from Hollywood.

Natural Selection (Brian Cage and Shaun Ricker) defeated RockNES Monsters (Johnny Yuma and Johnny Goodtime) in the finals of a tournament to become the Mach One Wrestling Tag Team Champions. Then the name was later changed to the NWA Heritage Tag Team Championships when they joined the NWA Territory. After departing from the NWA, the name was formally changed to the "CWFH Heritage Tag Team Championships"

== Reigns ==
Key
No.	Overall reign number
Reign	Reign number for the specific champion
Days	Number of days held
+	Current reign is changing daily

No.	Champion	Championship change			Reign statistics		Notes	Ref.
No.	Champion	Date	Event	Location	Reign	Days	Notes	Ref.
National Wrestling Alliance (NWA)
1	Natural Selection (Brian Cage and Shaun Ricker)	January 29, 2010	N/A	Anaheim, CA	1	64	Natural Selection defeated RockNES Monsters (Johnny Yuma and Johnny Goodtime) in tournament final to become the first M1W Tag Team Champions, They were later changed to the NWA Heritage Tag Team Championships.	
2	RockNES Monsters (Johnny Yuma and Johnny Goodtime)	April 3, 2010	N/A	Anaheim, CA	1	249		
3	Natural Selection (Brian Cage and Shaun Ricker)	December 8, 2010	N/A	Hollywood, CA	2	214		
4	The Tribe (Hawaiian Lion and Navajo Warrior)	July 10, 2011	N/A	Los Angeles, CA	1	581	During their reign, The Tribe were presented with official CWFH Heritage Tag Team Title belts.	
Championship Wrestling from Hollywood (CWFH)
5	Los Banditos (Rico Dynamite and Tito Escondido)	February 10, 2013	N/A	Glendale, CA	1	161		
6	PPrAy (Peter Avalon and Ray Rosas)	July 21, 2013	N/A	N/A	1	266		
	RockNES Monsters (Johnny Yuma , Kevin Martenson and Percival Diddums)	April 13, 2014	N/A	Port Hueneme, CA	2	182		
8	PPrAy (Peter Avalon and Ray Rosas)	October 12, 2014	N/A	Port Hueneme, CA	2	12		
9	RockNES Monsters (Johnny Yuma and Kevin Martenson)	October 24, 2014	N/A	Port Hueneme, CA	3	58		
10	PPrAy (Peter Avalon and Ray Rosas)	December 21, 2014	N/A	Port Hueneme, CA	3	91		
11	Vermin (Joey Ryan and Ryan Taylor)	March 22, 2015	N/A	Port Hueneme, CA	1	99		
12	Drew Gulak and Timothy Thatcher	June 29, 2015	N/A	Port Hueneme, CA	1	160	Gulak and Thatcher were awarded the UWN Tag Team Championship.	

== List of combined reigns ==
=== By team ===
†	Indicates the current champions
+	Indicates the current reign is changing daily
<1	Indicates that the combined total is less than one day.

Rank	Wrestler	# of reigns	Combined days
1	The Tribe (Hawaiian Lion and Navajo Warrior)	1	581
2	RockNES Monsters (Johnny Yuma and Johnny Goodtime)	3	580
3	PPrAy (Peter Avalon and Ray Rosas)	3	266
4	Natural Selection (Brian Cage and Shaun Ricker)	2	278
5	Los Banditos (Rico Dynamite and Tito Escondido)	1	161
6	Drew Gulak and Timothy Thatcher	1	160
7	Vermin (Joey Ryan and Ryan Taylor	1	98

=== By wrestler ===
†	Indicates the current champions
+	Indicates the current reign is changing daily
<1	Indicates that the combined total is less than one day.

Rank	Wrestler	# of reigns	Combined days
1	Hawaiian Lion	1	581
1	Navajo Warrior	1	581
3	Johnny Yuma	3	580
3	Johnny Goodtime	3	580
4	Brian Cage	2	278
4	Shaun Ricker		278
6	Peter Avalon	3	266
6	Ray Rosas	3	266
8	Rico Dynamite	1	161
8	Tito Escondido	1	161
10	Drew Gulak	1	160
10	Timothy Thatcher	1	160
12	Joey Ryan	1	98
12	Ryan Taylor	1	98

== See also ==
- UWN Tag Team Championship
