= Chuck Taylor (wrestler) =

American professional wrestler (born 1986)

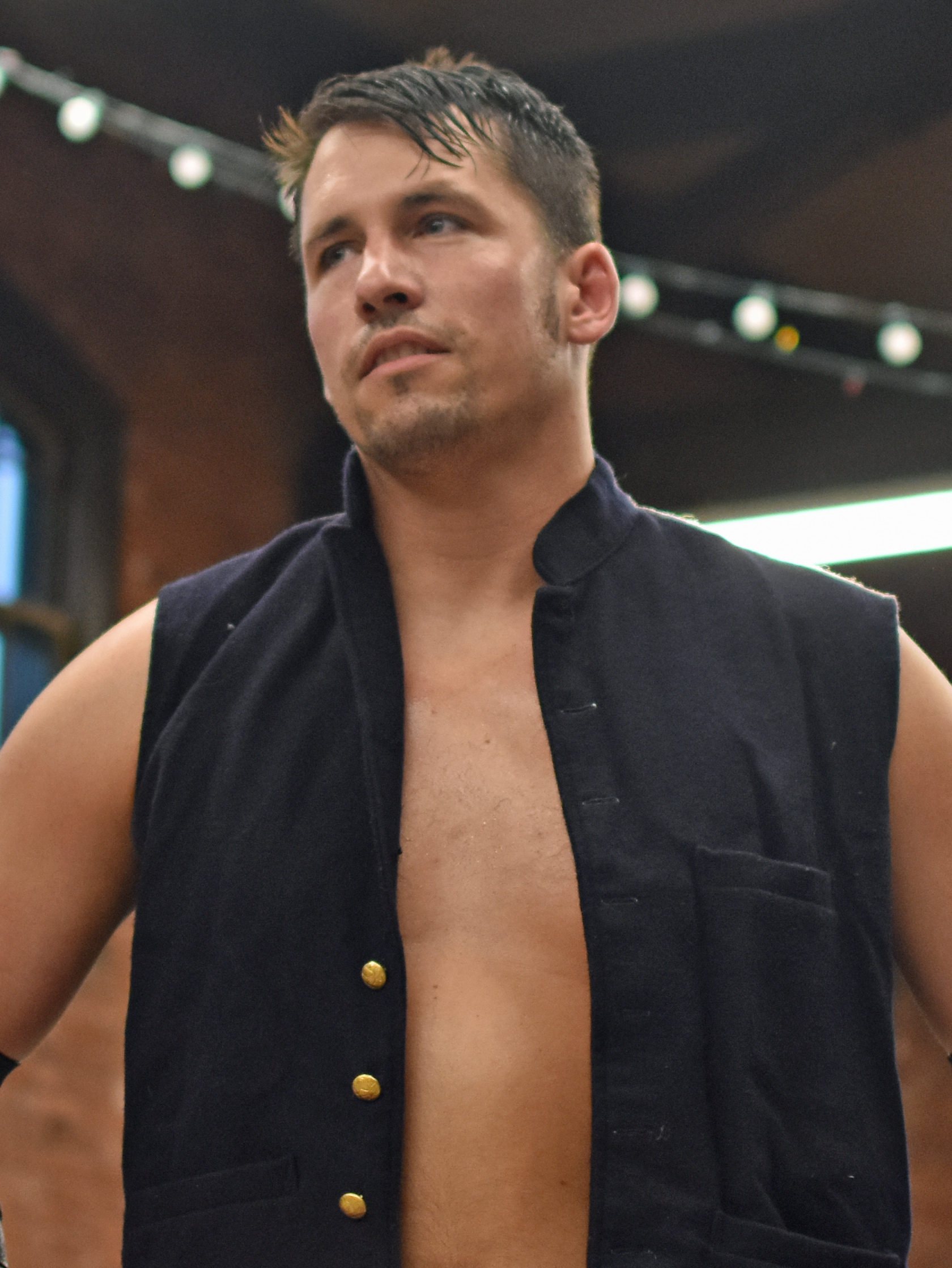
- Taylor in 2018

Personal information
- Born: Dustin Lee Howard; April 22, 1986 (age 40) Murray, Kentucky, U.S.

Professional wrestling career
- Ring name(s): Benny Figg; Bugg Nevans; Chuckie T. Charles Taylor; Chuck Taylor; Dustin; Howie Dewitt; Karate Durling; Mr. Azerbaijan; Rick Beanbag; Rich Mahogany; Scoot Tatum; Stewie Scrivens; Touch Phillips
- Billed height: 6 ft 2 in (188 cm)
- Billed weight: 210 lb (95 kg)
- Billed from: Murray, Kentucky; Raccoon City
- Trained by: Brandon Walker
- Debut: 2002

Dustin Lee Howard (born April 22, 1986), better known by the ring name Chuck Taylor, is an American professional wrestler. He is signed to All Elite Wrestling (AEW), where he also works as a coach as well as in-ring talent. Known as "The Kentucky Gentleman" and "Sexy Chuckie T", he was a member of the Best Friends stable alongside original tag team partner Trent Beretta, Orange Cassidy, Kris Statlander, and Danhausen. Howard has wrestled on the independent circuit since 2002, most notably appearing for Chikara, where he held the Campeonatos de Parejas twice, and Pro Wrestling Guerrilla (PWG), where he is a former two-time PWG World Champion. He is also known for his work in larger national and international promotions like Ring of Honor (ROH) and New Japan Pro-Wrestling (NJPW).

== Professional wrestling career ==
=== Early career (2002–2005) ===
Dustin began his wrestling training in 2002, at age 15, under the tutelage of Brandon Walker at the Old School Wrestling Training Academy in Hardin, Kentucky. Due to age requirements for wrestling licenses in Kentucky, he was unable to wrestle during shows in-state until age 18, during which time he wrestled for promotions in Tennessee and Illinois. The most prominent of these was the then-newly restarted Chaos Pro Wrestling (CPW) in Brookport, Illinois, where he began his friendship with fellow wrestler Trevor Mann, who has since been known by the ring name Ricochet. Howard's ring name of Chuck Taylor was derived by his trainers due to his habit of wearing the famous sneakers of the same name during training sessions.

=== Chikara ===
==== The Kings of Wrestling (2006–2007) ====
Howard, under the ring name Chuck Taylor, made his Chikara debut on June 24, 2006, at the Young Lions Cup IV tournament, defeating his rival Ricochet in the first round before being eliminated in the six-way semi-final round by Andy Sumner. The next night, he teamed up with Cloudy to defeat Ricochet and Player Uno in a non-tournament tag team match, with the four receiving a standing ovation after the match. However, Taylor would quickly become a villain during his match with Eddie Kingston at the Brick event on November 17, gaining an upset victory with some help from an interfering "Sweet & Sour" Larry Sweeney. After impressing Sweeney, Taylor was allowed to replace Chris Hero in the 2007 King of Trios tournament, joining Team F.I.S.T. (Icarus and Gran Akuma) on the Kings of Wrestling team. The Kings of Wrestling made it to the semi-final round before losing to the team of Miyawaki, Yoshiaki Yago and KUDO.

==== Team F.I.S.T. and championship success (2007–2013) ====
Despite the loss, Taylor rebounded by entering the first-ever Rey de Voladores tournament on April 22, 2007, defeating the likes of PAC, Ricochet, Retail Dragon en route to the finals of the tournament, where he defeated Lince Dorado. However, problems in the Kings of Wrestling arose as Chris Hero, the man he replaced at King of Trios, had split the Kings of Wrestling stable in two, with Hero, Sweeney, and Claudio Castagnoli comprising the Kings of Wrestling while Team F.I.S.T. (Taylor, Akuma, and Icarus) once again became a separate team. At the Aniversario! event in May, the Kings and F.I.S.T. met in a six-man tag team match, which F.I.S.T. won. Despite losing, the Kings reunited with F.I.S.T. and the Kings of Wrestling became the top stable in Chikara, later recruiting Mitch Ryder, Max Boyer and Shayne Hawke to their ranks. Using this momentum, Taylor went on to win the Young Lions Cup V, beating Cabana Man Dan, Lince Dorado, MosCOW the Communist Bovine, Player Uno, Ice Cream, Jr. and Amigo Suzuki on the first night and Arik Cannon in the semifinals on the second night, before beating longtime rival Ricochet in the finals.

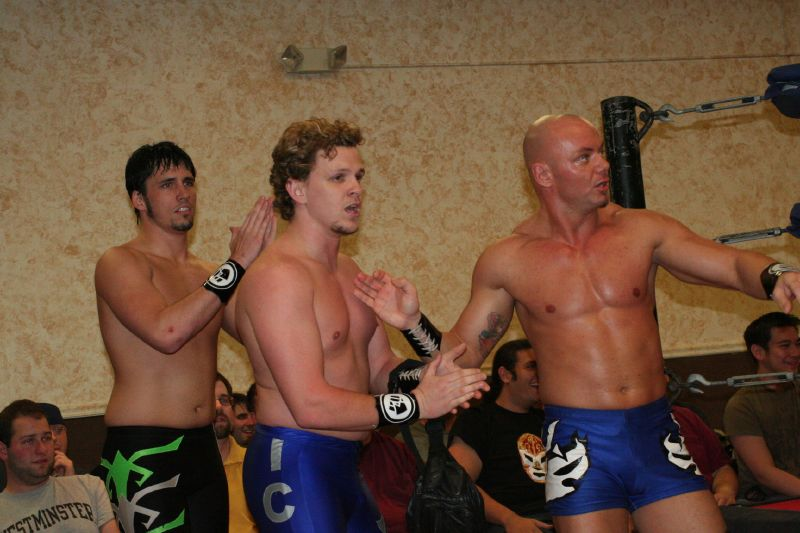
Team F.I.S.T. (from left to right: Taylor, Icarus, and Gran Akuma) in 2008

After a successful title defense against Drake Younger, Taylor put the cup on the line against Ricochet on August 18 at the 2007 International Invaders weekend, with Ricochet putting his career on the line. Taylor would win the match, seemingly ridding his rival for good. However, Taylor's momentum would come to a halt after he was eliminated in that years Torneo Cibernetico match by Lince Dorado. A month later, he was defeated by Claudio Castagnoli in singles competition at the October 26 event Bruised. Later that night, Taylor replaced an inactive Icarus to team with Akuma in a Campeonatos de Parejas title defense against Incoherence (Delirious and Hallowicked), which Taylor and Akuma lost. The next night, Taylor lost his Young Lions Cup to the debuting newcomer, Helios, who bore a striking resemblance to Ricochet. However, Taylor managed to regain some success before the end of 2007 by defeating Shane Storm and Passion Hasegawa, respectively in singles matches before teaming up with Team F.I.S.T. to beat the team of Tim Donst and Los Ice Creams (El Hijo del Ice Cream and Ice Cream, Jr.).

Taylor once again teamed up with Icarus and Akuma in the 2008 King of Trios tournament, this time making it to the quarterfinal round before being knocked out by The Colony (Fire Ant, Worker Ant, and Soldier Ant). Following the King of Trios, Taylor returned singles competition but still remained a member of F.I.S.T., occasionally tagging with either Akuma or Icarus.

For the first half of 2009, Taylor, Icarus and Akuma feuded with The Colony, defeating them on February 20 in a King of Trios qualifying match. After the match Taylor gave Worker Ant the Awful Waffle on the floor of the arena, which in kayfabe was the reason for his retirement following the match. On March 27 F.I.S.T. entered their third King of Trios, defeating The Death Match Kings (Brain Damage, Necro Butcher and Toby Klein) in the first round of the tournament. After defeating The F1rst Family (Arik Cannon, Darin Corbin and Ryan Cruz) in the quarter-finals, F.I.S.T. advanced to the semifinals of the tournament, where they would defeat the team of Equinox, Lince Dorado and Helios, the team known collectively as The Future is Now. On March 29, 2009, F.I.S.T. defeated Team Uppercut (Bryan Danielson, Claudio Castagnoli and Dave Taylor) in the finals, when Taylor forced Danielson to tap out to the Cross Crab, to win the 2009 King of Trios. On May 24, 2009, at Aniversario Yang F.I.S.T. ended their feud with The Colony, when Taylor and Icarus lost a "Double Mask vs. Double Hair" match against Fire Ant and Soldier Ant, and were both shaved bald.

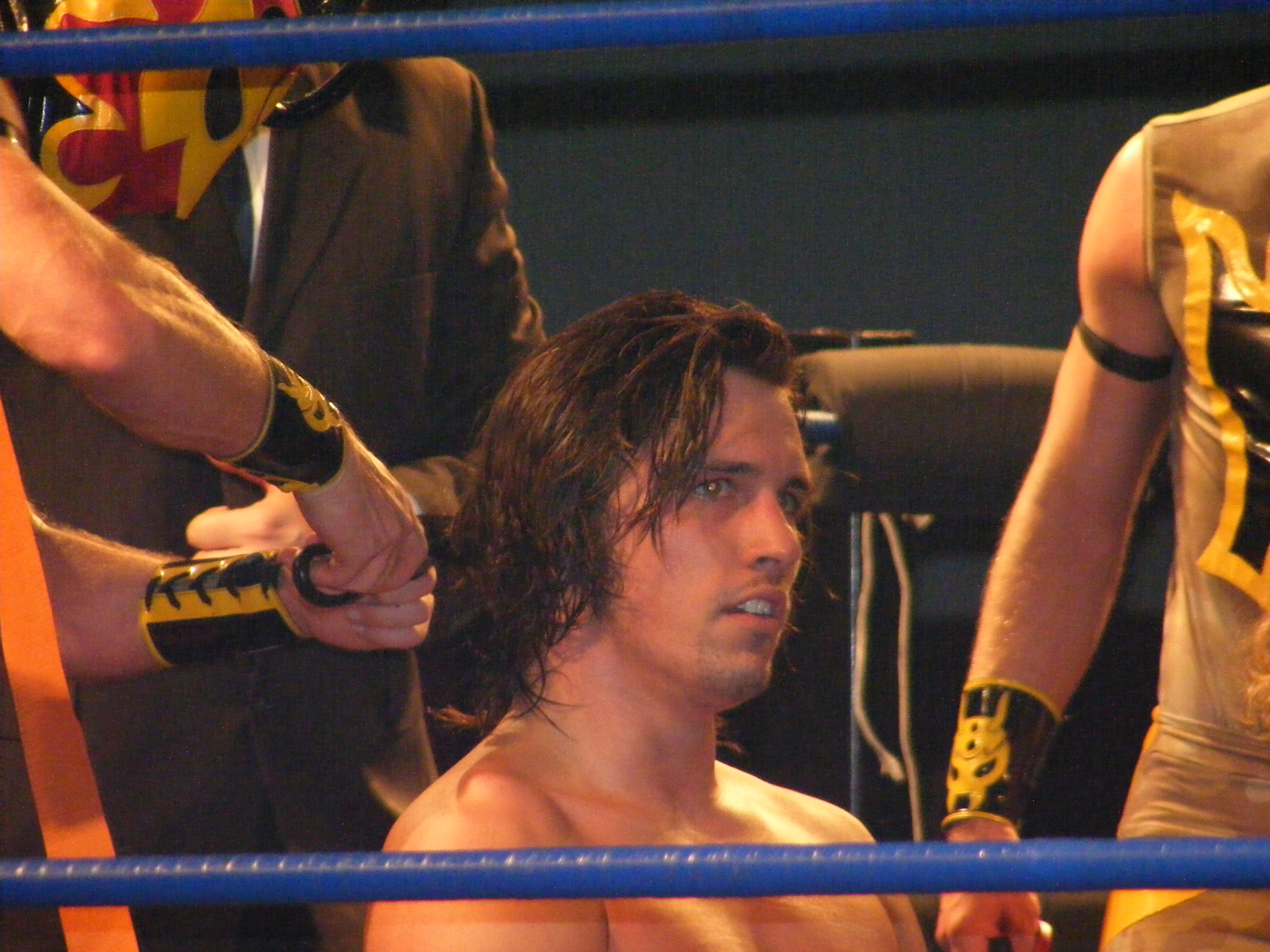

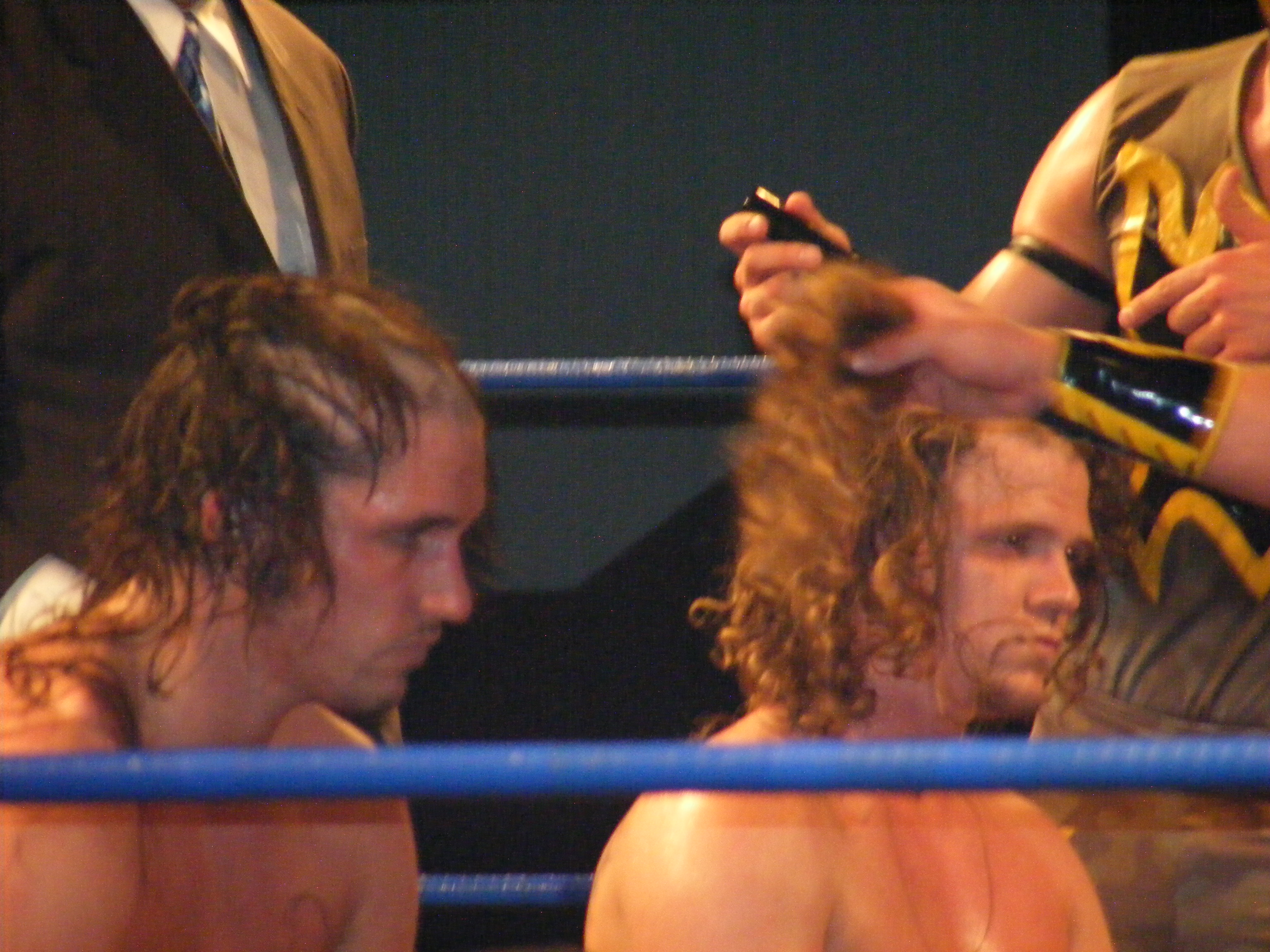
Taylor and Icarus being shaved following their Double Mask vs. Double Hair loss to The Colony

On April 23, 2010, F.I.S.T. entered the 2010 King of Trios tournament, attempting to become the first two-time King of Trios winners. After defeating The Throwbacks (Dasher Hatfield, Sugar Dunkerton and Matt Classic) in the first round, F.I.S.T. was eliminated in the quarter-finals by Team Osaka Pro (Atsushi Kotoge, Daisuke Harada and Tadasuke). During the tournament F.I.S.T. was observed by Johnny Gargano, a self admitted fan of the team, who managed to stir up problems between its members by suggesting that the team had a weak link, which led to Taylor, who had been pinned in the match against Osaka Pro, pointing out Akuma and Akuma retaliating by claiming that Icarus was and always had been the weak link. Taylor caused even more dissension in F.I.S.T. by offering himself to Dragon Gate USA's World–1 stable, a competitor of Kamikaze USA, Gran Akuma's stable in the company. On July 26 at Chikarasaurus Rex: King of Show F.I.S.T. was defeated in a six-man tag team match by CIMA, Masaaki Mochizuki and Super Shenglong, when CIMA pinned Akuma. After the match Taylor and Icarus turned on Akuma, kicked him out of both F.I.S.T. and Chikara and gave his spot in the stable to Johnny Gargano. With Gargano as a member, the new F.I.S.T. ended their losing streak by defeating Da Soul Touchaz (Acid Jaz, Marshe Rockett and Willie Richardson) and 3.0 (Scott Parker and Shane Matthews) and Soldier Ant in six man tag team matches on September 18 and 19. On April 15, 2011, F.I.S.T. entered the 2011 King of Trios, defeating Team Australia (Kabel, Percy T and Tama Williams) in their first round match. The following day F.I.S.T. defeated Team Osaka Pro (Atsushi Kotoge, Daisuke Harada and Ultimate Spider Jr.), avenging their loss from the previous year and advancing to the semifinals of the tournament. On April 17, F.I.S.T. scored a major upset in the semifinals of the King of Trios tournament by defeating Team Michinoku Pro (Dick Togo, Great Sasuke and Jinsei Shinzaki), when Icarus rolled up Sasuke for the win, after Taylor had blinded him with powder. Later that same day, F.I.S.T. was defeated in the finals of the tournament by The Colony (Fire Ant, Green Ant and Soldier Ant). In June and July, Taylor and Gargano gained three points and the right to challenge for the Campeonatos de Parejas with victories over the teams of The Colony (Green Ant and Soldier Ant), Incoherence (Frightmare and Hallowicked) and Atlantis and Rey Bucanero. On September 18, Taylor and Gargano defeated Jigsaw and Mike Quackenbush to win the Chikara Campeonatos de Parejas for the first time. Taylor and Gargano made their first title defense on October 7, defeating Momo no Seishun Tag (Atsushi Kotoge and Daisuke Harada) with help from Icarus in the third match between F.I.S.T. and the Osaka Pro Wrestling representatives. On October 30, Taylor and Icarus, who replaced Gargano who was unable to attend the event due to traveling issues, successfully defended the Campeonatos de Parejas against the Throwbacks (Dasher Hatfield and Sugar Dunkerton). F.I.S.T. made their third successful title defense on December 2, during Chikara's special post-season JoshiMania weekend, defeating The Colony. On February 25, 2012, Icarus again replaced an injured Gargano in a title defense, where F.I.S.T. defeated the Spectral Envoy (Hallowicked and UltraMantis Black). On March 24, Taylor and Icarus lost the Campeonatos de Parejas to 3.0. After earning three points in a four-way elimination match on April 14, Taylor and Gargano defeated 3.0 in a rematch on April 29 to regain the title and become the first two-time Campeones de Parejas. On June 2 at Chikarasaurus Rex: How to Hatch a Dinosaur, F.I.S.T. lost the title to The Young Bucks (Matt and Nick Jackson) in their first title defense.

On August 2, Chikara's Director of Fun, Wink Vavasseur, named Sugar Dunkerton, who had announced his wish to join a stable, the fourth member of F.I.S.T. The other members, however, refused to accept Dunkerton as a full-fledged member, instead referring to him as their "water boy". On September 14, F.I.S.T., represented by Taylor, Icarus and Gargano, entered the 2012 King of Trios tournament, defeating Team Osaka Pro (Ebessan, Kikutaro and Takoyakida) in their first round match. The following day, F.I.S.T. defeated the all-female Team JWP (Command Bolshoi, Kaori Yoneyama and Tsubasa Kuragaki) to advance to the semifinals of the tournament. On the third and final day of the tournament, F.I.S.T. was eliminated from the tournament in the semifinals by the Spectral Envoy (Frightmare, Hallowicked and UltraMantis Black), who went on to win the entire tournament. In early 2013, the members of F.I.S.T. began having problems with each other, leading to Icarus turning on Gargano on May 3 over his treatment of Sugar Dunkerton.

==== Mr. Azerbaijan and feud with Chuck Taylor™ (2013–2018) ====
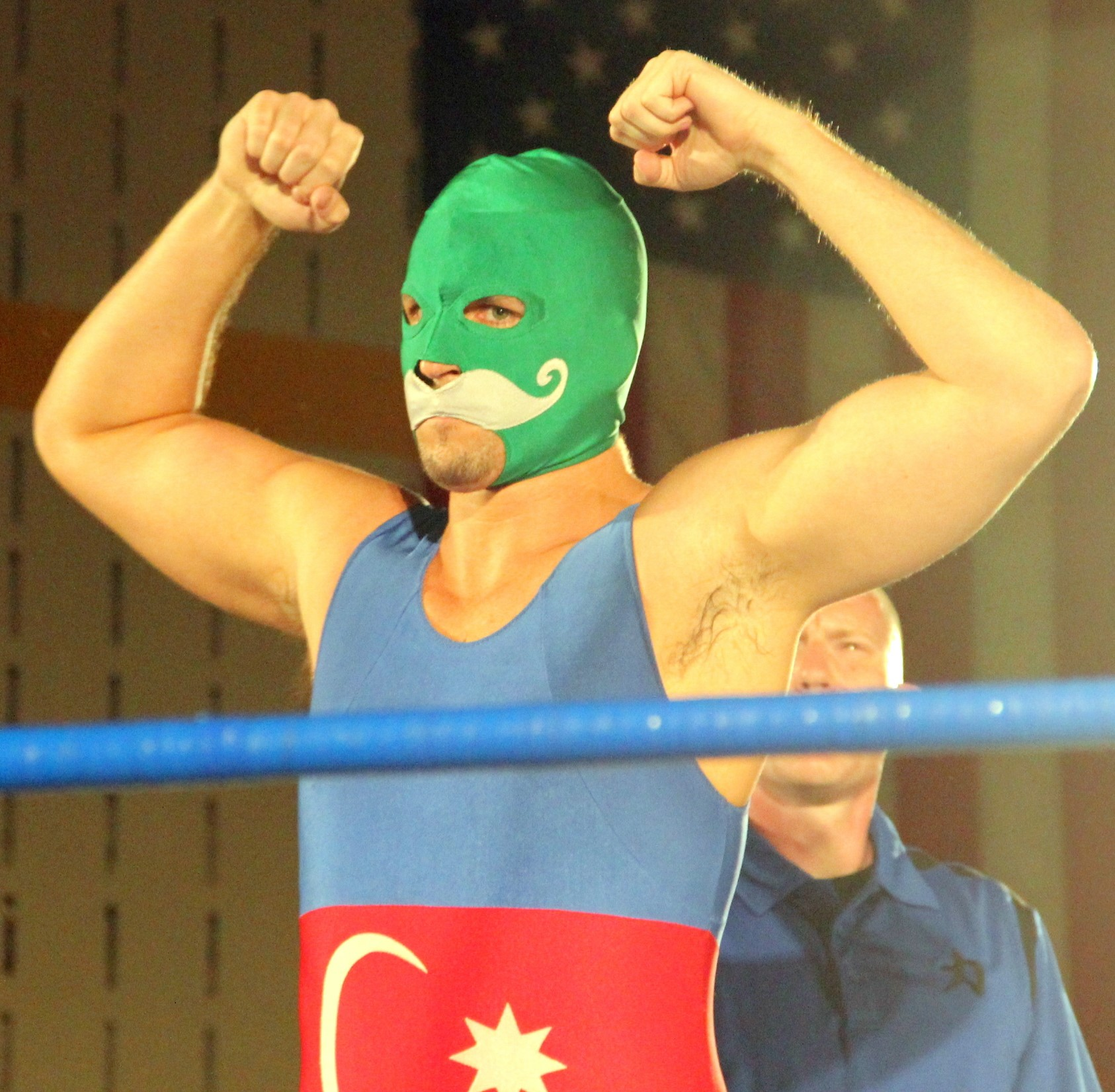
Mr. Azerbaijan in 2015

In 2013, Chuck began wrestling as a new character, Mr. Azerbaijan, for Chikara's sister promotion Wrestling is Fun!. On January 25, 2015, Taylor received his first shot at the Chikara Grand Championship, but was defeated by the defending champion, his former F.I.S.T. stablemate Icarus.

On February 6, 2016, at Chikara's National Pro Wrestling Day, he debuted under the new name Scoot Tatum. However, after the match he said, "I hate the name. I'm changing it." This was later revealed to be part of a larger legal battle with the new owner of the "Chuck Taylor" name, Chuck Taylor™. He appeared at the next Chikara show, Dead Man's Chest, using another new name Rick Beanbag. After this show he tweeted that he 'wasn't feeling it' and the following day at Evil Ways he appeared under the name Bugg Nevans. He eventually used the names Stewie Scrivens, Rich Mahogany, Slim Perkins, and Howie Dewitt, before settling on the name Dustin. In January 2018, Dustin's profile was quietly removed from Chikara's website, confirming his departure from the promotion.

=== Pro Wrestling Guerrilla (2008–2019) ===
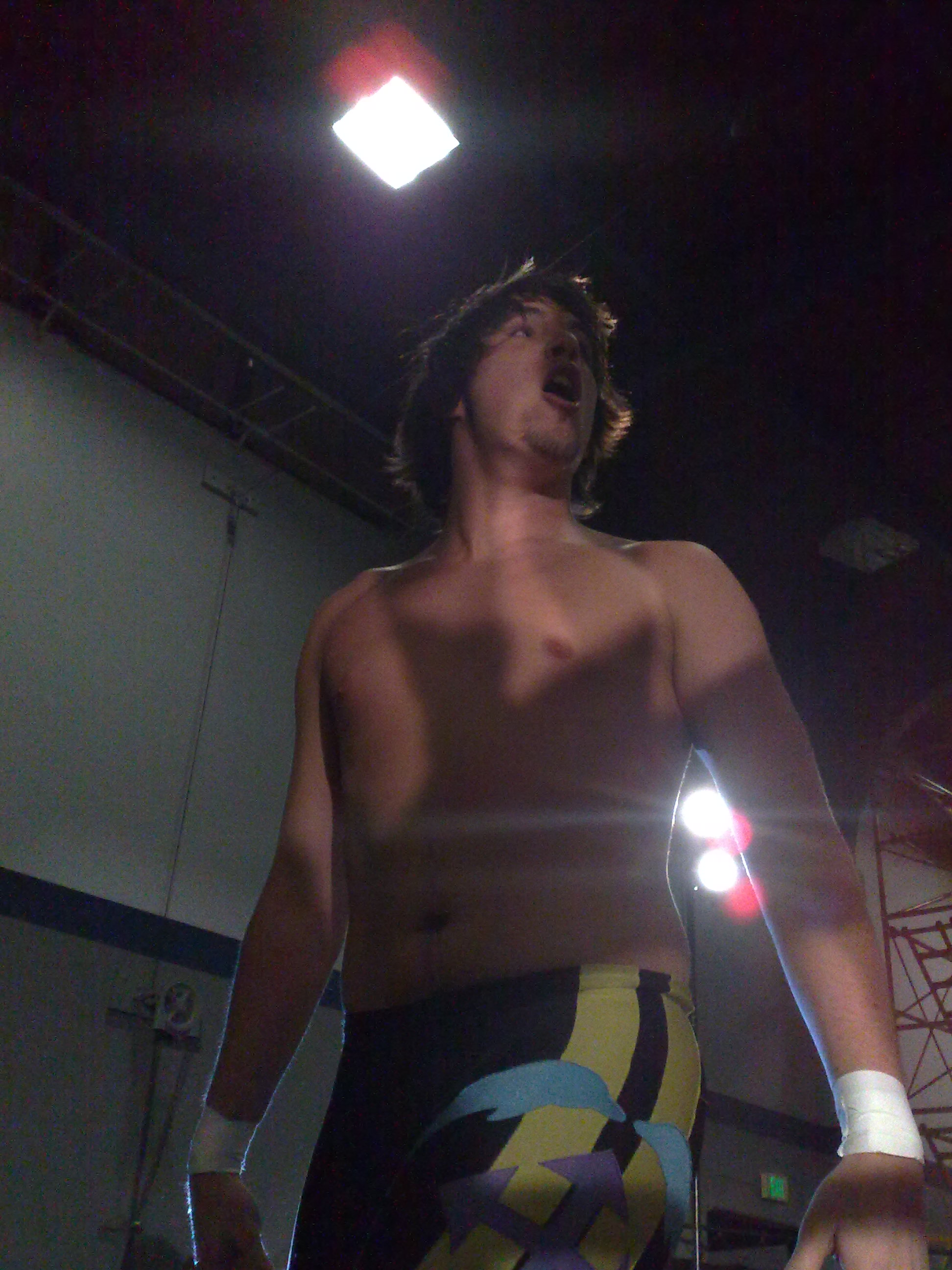
The Kentucky Gentleman at PWG's Battle of Los Angeles show in 2008

On August 30, 2008, Taylor made his Pro Wrestling Guerrilla debut at All Star Weekend 7, defeating female wrestler Candice LeRae in a specialty match. The next night, he teamed with fellow Chikara mainstay Vin Gerard to take on The Dynasty (Scott Lost and Joey Ryan) in a losing effort. Less than a month later, Taylor was invited to participate in the 2008 Battle of Los Angeles, which notably had seven fewer competitors (almost a third of the usual number) than it did the year before. He originally defeated T. J. Perkins in the first round, but the decision was reversed after the referee caught Taylor with brass knuckles in his hand.

Starting in 2009, Taylor began a heated rivalry with popular regular El Generico, stemming from his dream of opening an orphanage called "Los Angelitos de El Generico" and Taylor's hatred of orphans. After he was unable to secure a singles victory, Taylor acquired the help of fellow PWG newcomer Kenny Omega, a fellow orphan hater who also faced, and subsequently lost, a singles match to Generico the next month. Taylor's brief losing streak would continue with a memorable defeat at the hands of Bryan Danielson at Ninety-Nine.

On May 22, 2009, Taylor and Omega teamed up for the annual DDT4 tag team tournament. In the quarterfinals, they overcame the team of Dark & Lovely (Scorpio Sky and Human Tornado), who were substituting for scheduled opponents Los Luchas. Becoming a sensation with fans overnight, they next faced World Tag Team Champions The Young Bucks in a title match, losing in controversial fashion. The makeshift team's sudden popularity had a major hand in causing the champions to get booed post-match and for the duration of the evening.

Now referred to as "Men of Low Moral Fiber", Taylor and Omega were scheduled to face Danielson and Roderick Strong (Hybrid Dolphins) in June, but a staph infection kept the former out of action. At Threemendous II, after 2 Skinny Black Guys (Generico and Tornado) reunited to beat The Young Bucks in a non-title match, Taylor attacked Generico and challenged him to a Reseda Street Fight, the winning man's team becoming the number one contenders for the championship. Taylor won the match and his team made the challenge at Against the Grain, losing yet again. It was revealed at the end of the defense that senior referee Rick Knox had been paid by the Bucks to fix their recent bouts.

With Omega winning the World Championship at the 2009 Battle of Los Angeles, Taylor and new tag team partner Tornado (having parted ways with Generico after a brief reunion), known collectively as the "2 Skinny Black Guys of Low Moral Fiber", were scheduled to take on the Bucks for the Tag Team championship on January 30, 2010, at WrestleReunion 4, however, due to a snowstorm Taylor was forced to miss the event. The match was rescheduled for PWG's next show, As the Worm Turns, but due to Tornado's sudden retirement from professional wrestling, Taylor would instead partner with Tornado's former partner, and Taylor's former rival, El Generico. They reprised the name 2 Skinny Black Guys of Low Moral Fiber. At the event the Young Bucks defeated Taylor and Generico to retain the Tag Team Titles. While Kenny Omega began spending increased amount of time in Japan, away from PWG, Chuck Taylor went on to form a new alliance in September 2010, called the Fightin' Taylor Boys, with Ryan Taylor and Brian Cage (who would adopt the ring name Brian Cage-Taylor). Following the folding of the stable, after Brian Cage went solo, Taylor formed a new stable named Best Friends with Joey Ryan and Trent? in August 2013. On January 31, 2014, Taylor and Trent? defeated three other teams. In the first round defeating the Rockness Monsters (Johnny Yuma and Johnny Goodtime). In the Semi-finals the Best Friends upset Cole Steen Cole (Adam Cole and Kevin Steen) with an assist from Candice Lerae. In the finals the Best Friends defeated the Inner City Machine Guns (Rich Swann and Ricochet) to win the 2014 Dynamite Duumvirate Tag Team Title Tournament. As a result, Taylor and Trent? received a shot at the PWG World Tag Team Championship on March 28, but were defeated by the defending champions, The Young Bucks. In 2015, Taylor began a winning streak, beginning with himself and Trent? defeating The Beaver Boys at "From Out Of Nowhere" and then defeating the likes of Kikutaro, Marty Scurll, and even former partner Trent? in singles action. In December 2016 at "Mystery Vortex IV", the still-unbeaten Taylor earned his first shot at the PWG Championship by defeating Adam Cole in a #1 Contender's match. In February 2017 at "Only Kings Understand Each Other", Chuck Taylor faced champion Zack Sabre Jr in a losing effort. Taylor was attacked after the match by the now-heel Sabre and Marty Scurll, only to see Trent? come to his defense. On July 7, 2017, Taylor defeated Sabre to become PWG World Champion for the first time, only to lose the title to Ricochet on October 21 in his first defense. Taylor would go on to defeat Ricochet and reclaim the PWG World Championship in a Guerrilla Warfare match at PWG Mystery Vortex V. On March 23, 2018, Taylor lost the title against Keith Lee at Time is a Flat Circle.

=== Evolve (2010–2017) ===
On January 16, 2010, Taylor participated in Evolve's first show, defeating Cheech in a qualifying match to earn a spot in the promotion's roster. After defeating Ricochet on March 13, Taylor earned himself a main event spot on Evolve's third show on May 1, in which he defeated Claudio Castagnoli. At the fourth show on July 23, Taylor defeated Jimmy Jacobs. Taylor's winning streak came to an end on September 11, when he was defeated by Mike Quackenbush. At the following event on November 20, Taylor was defeated in the main event of the evening by Austin Aries. At the end of the year, Taylor was named both Breakout Star and MVP of 2010. On April 19, 2011, at Evolve's first live internet pay-per-view, Taylor defeated Akira Tozawa. However, immediately following the match, Taylor was placed in a tiebreaker match against Johnny Gargano to determine Evolve's wins leader. Gargano won the match, after Reby Sky threw in the towel for Taylor. Taylor and Gargano had a rematch on July 26 at Evolve 9, which was won by Taylor.

Taylor only appeared once for Evolve in 2015, reuniting with Ronin to defeat The Bravado Brothers and Moose in a "losing team must split up" match at Evolve 37.

Taylor returned to Evolve in 2016, now working under the ring name Dustin and winning the Evolve Tag Team Championship with Drew Galloway on July 16 as well as joining Galloway's crusade against Evolve's supposed hypocrisy in wanting to be independent while at the same time affiliating themselves with WWE. They lost the title on November 13. On January 28, 2017, Taylor lost to Matt Riddle in a no disqualification match. This marked his last match in Evolve.

=== Dragon Gate USA (2010–2014) ===
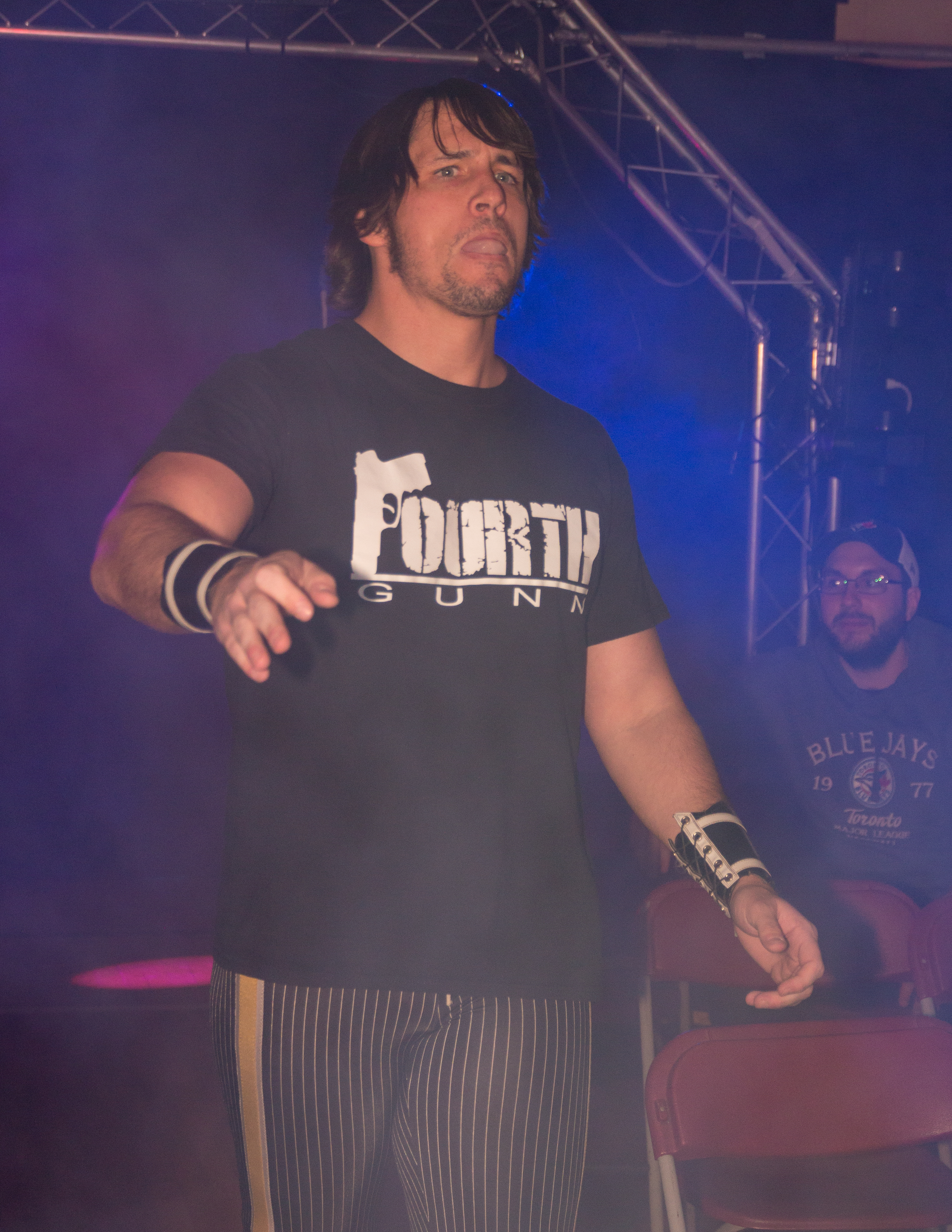
Taylor at Smash Wrestling in 2015

After offering himself to face stable World–1, Taylor made his debut for Dragon Gate USA on July 24 at Enter the Dragon 2010, defeating Adam Cole, Arik Cannon and Ricochet in a four-way match. At the following event on September 25, Taylor won another four-way match, this time defeating Drake Younger, Johnny Gargano and Rich Swann. The following day Taylor suffered his first loss in Dragon Gate USA, losing to CIMA in a singles match. On October 29 at Dragon Gate USA's first live pay-per-view, Bushido: Code of the Warrior, Taylor defeated Arik Cannon, Johnny Gargano and Ricochet in a four-way match. After the match CIMA offered him a spot in his Warriors International stable, but Taylor turned the offer down. Later in the night Taylor, Gargano and Rich Swann attacked CIMA and Ricochet and announced that they would be forming their own stable called Ronin. At the following day's tapings of Freedom Fight 2010, Ronin defeated Austin Aries, Genki Horiguchi and Ricochet in a six-man tag team match. On January 29, 2011, Taylor and Gargano entered a three-day-long tournament to determine the first ever Open the United Gate Champions. In their first tournament match, they defeated Blood Warriors representatives Naruki Doi and Ricochet and followed that up by defeating another Blood Warriors team of CIMA and Dragon Kid the following day. On January 30 Taylor and Gargano were defeated in the finals of the tournament by World–1 representatives Masato Yoshino and PAC. On March 1, 2011, Ronin started their first three-week-long tour of Japanese promotion Dragon Gate. In their first match of the tour, Taylor, Gargano and Swann defeated Blood Warriors representatives CIMA, Naruki Doi and Naoki Tanizaki in a six-man tag team match. On April 2 at Mercury Rising 2011, Ronin, now working as a face group, was defeated in the main event six man tag team match by the Blood Warriors team of CIMA, Naruki Doi and Ricochet. On September 10 at Untouchable 2011, Taylor defeated Masato Yoshino, Naruki Doi and Sami Callihan to earn a match of his choosing for Ronin. He then announced that Gargano and Swann would be challenging Yoshino and PAC for the Open the United Gate Championship. However, when Gargano defeated Naruki Doi at the following day's Way of the Ronin 2011 PPV, he announced his intention of going for the Open the Freedom Gate Championship and suggested that Taylor and Swann challenge for the Open the United Gate Championship instead. This, however, led to Taylor proclaiming that he was not interested in the tag team championship and instead announced that he was using his right to book himself a match for the Open the Freedom Gate Championship. On November 12 at Bushido 2011, Taylor unsuccessfully challenged YAMATO for the Open the Freedom Gate Championship. At one point Taylor seemingly had won the match with a pinfall, but the referee decided to restart the match after Johnny Gargano admitted that YAMATO's foot was on the rope during the pinfall. After the match Taylor stole the Open the Freedom Gate Championship belt and ran out of the arena. The following day at Freedom Fight 2011, Taylor handed the belt to new champion, Ronin stablemate Johnny Gargano, seemingly putting their past differences aside. However, after failing to win the Open the United Gate Championship on March 30, 2012, Taylor turned on Gargano, ending the partnership.

Following his turn, Taylor formed the Gentleman's Club with Drew Gulak and Jake Manning. On June 29, Taylor unsuccessfully challenged Gargano for the Open the Freedom Gate Championship. On July 29 at Enter the Dragon 2012, Dragon Gate USA's third anniversary event, Taylor was defeated by Gargano in an "I Quit" match. On November 4 at Freedom Fight 2012, Taylor was defeated by former Ronin stablemate Rich Swann in a No Disqualification grudge match. The following week, Taylor signed a two-year contract with Dragon Gate USA and Evolve.

=== Total Nonstop Action Wrestling (2016) ===
Taylor wrestled on Total Nonstop Action Wrestling (TNA)'s One Night Only: X-Travaganza 2016 pay-per-view event, firstly defeating Rockstar Spud before being defeated in a seven-person X Division Championship ladder match. Taylor would make one more TNA appearance in 2016, teaming with JT Dunn unsuccessfully against The Broken Hardys on an episode of Impact Wrestling.

=== Ring of Honor (2017–2019) ===
On May 14, 2017, Howard, billed as Chuckie T., made his debut for Ring of Honor (ROH) as Roppongi Vice's surprise partner in a six-man tag team match against Bullet Club. On June 23 at Best in the World, Chuckie teamed with Beretta to unsuccessfully challenge The Young Bucks for the ROH World Tag Team Championship in a three-way tag team match, also involving War Machine. On February 23 and 24, 2018, Chuckie participated on the ROH/NJPW joint Honor Rising: Japan tour. On February 23, Chuckie and Beretta teamed with Chaos stablemate Jay White to defeat Dalton Castle, Jay Lethal, and Ryusuke Taguchi. The following night on February 24, Chuckie, White, and Yoshi-Hashi were defeated by Hangman Page and The Young Bucks.

=== New Japan Pro-Wrestling (2017–2019) ===
On November 6, 2017, Howard, as Chuckie T., was announced as a participant in New Japan Pro-Wrestling's 2017 World Tag League alongside Beretta. Chuckie was recognized as a member of the Chaos stable, having previously appeared alongside members of the stable at an ROH show on October 15. Chuckie and Beretta finished the tournament on December 9 with a record of four wins and three losses, failing to advance to the finals. On February 25, 2018, Chuckie T., was announced as a participant in the 2018 New Japan Cup, where he was eliminated by Sanada in the first round. On February 7, 2019, his profile was removed from NJPW website.

=== All Elite Wrestling (2019–present) ===
==== Best Friends (2019–2023) ====
On February 7, 2019, Taylor and Beretta appeared at an All Elite Wrestling (AEW) rally in Las Vegas and announced that they had joined the company. They would debut at AEW's inaugural event, Double or Nothing on May 25, where they defeated Angélico and Jack Evans. The following month at Fyter Fest, Best Friends competed in a three-way tag team match against Private Party (Isiah Kassidy and Marq Quen) and SoCal Uncensored (Frankie Kazarian and Scorpio Sky) for an opportunity to secure a bye in a tournament to determine to the inaugural AEW World Tag Team Champions, which they won. However, at All Out on August 31, Best Friends were defeated by The Dark Order's Evil Uno and Stu Grayson in a match where the winners qualified for the first round bye. Despite not receiving the bye, Best Friends still competed in the AEW World Tag Team Championship tournament, where they were eliminated in the first round by SoCal Uncensored. During this time they also became friends with and added Orange Cassidy to the team, including adding him to their trademark hug and zoom out. At Bash at the Beach on January 15, 2020, Best Friends competed in a four-way tag team match to determine the number one contenders for the AEW World Tag Team Championship, which was won by "Hangman" Adam Page and Kenny Omega. After winning a title shot when they defeated Private Party at Double or Nothing Buy-In, they faced Kenny Omega and "Hangman" Adam Page at Fyter Fest night 1, which they lost.

In late August, Taylor and Trent started a feud with Santana and Ortiz after Trent's mother's van was destroyed by the latter. This would culminate in a highly praised Parking Lot Brawl on the September 16 episode of Dynamite, where the Best Friends won.

Taylor, Trent, and Cassidy moved on to a feud with Kip Sabian and his "best man" Miro, following Trent's accidental destruction of Sabian and Penelope Ford's arcade machine. During the feud, Trent legitimately tore his pectoral muscle, sidelining him for months. This led to a match between Taylor and Miro on the January 13 Dynamite where, if Taylor lost, he had to serve as Miro's servant for a month. Following Taylor's submission loss to Miro, he was forced to wear a tuxedo and his ring name was tweaked to the more formal Charles Taylor, then telling Cassidy (at Miro's behest) that he was now best friends with Miro. At Beach Break, Taylor and Cassidy crashed Sabian and Ford's wedding, marking the end of Taylor's servant contract with Miro and reverting to the Chuck Taylor ring name, though Miro continued to call him "Charles". On the March 31 episode of Dynamite, Taylor and Cassidy fought Miro and Sabian in an "Arcade Anarchy match" where if Taylor lost again, he would become Miro's servant permanently. However, Taylor and Cassidy were victorious with assistance from a returning Trent and Kris Statlander, ending the feud. Chuck and Trent would continue to regularly team and go after the AEW World Tag Team Titles, but Trent would once again go down with injury a month later. During this time, Wheeler Yuta would join the stable, and they began feuds with the Hardy Family Office, The Elite, and others. Trent would return from injury in December, and Yuta would leave the group in May 2022 to join the Blackpool Combat Club.

In July 2023, Best Friends would begin feuding with the BCC, which led to the second ever Parking Lot Brawl, where Claudio Castagnoli and Jon Moxley were victorious with help from Wheeler Yuta, despite Orange Cassidy coming to help even the odds. Best Friends would then align with The Lucha Bros and Eddie Kingston and at All In, they defeated the team of the BCC and Santana & Ortiz in a Stadium Stampede match.

==== Career threatening injury; coaching role (2023–present) ====
Taylor would go down with an ankle injury in October, which kept him out of action for several months, but would still make periodic appearances. In March 2024, Trent and Orange Cassidy entered a tournament to crown new AEW tag team champions. After falling short in the semi-finals, Trent attacked Cassidy, leaving Taylor (who had accompanied them to the ring) stunned. Taylor and Trent wrestled in a Parking Lot Brawl, where Trent won. After the match, reports surfaced that Taylor would be forced to retire due to osteonecrosis caused by the prior ankle injury. On Renee Paquette's Closeup show on the AEW YouTube channel, Taylor addressed the rumors stating that he's hopeful to get another surgery done on his ankle after the summer in order to get cleared and revealed that he already begun working as a coach backstage in AEW while recovering.

== Filmography ==
Television
Year	Title	Role	Notes
2022	Floor Is Lava	Himself	

Web series
Year	Title	Role	Notes
2020–2023	Being The Elite	Himself	

Video game appearances
Year	Title	Role	Notes
2023	AEW Fight Forever	Himself	Playable character

== Championships and accomplishments ==
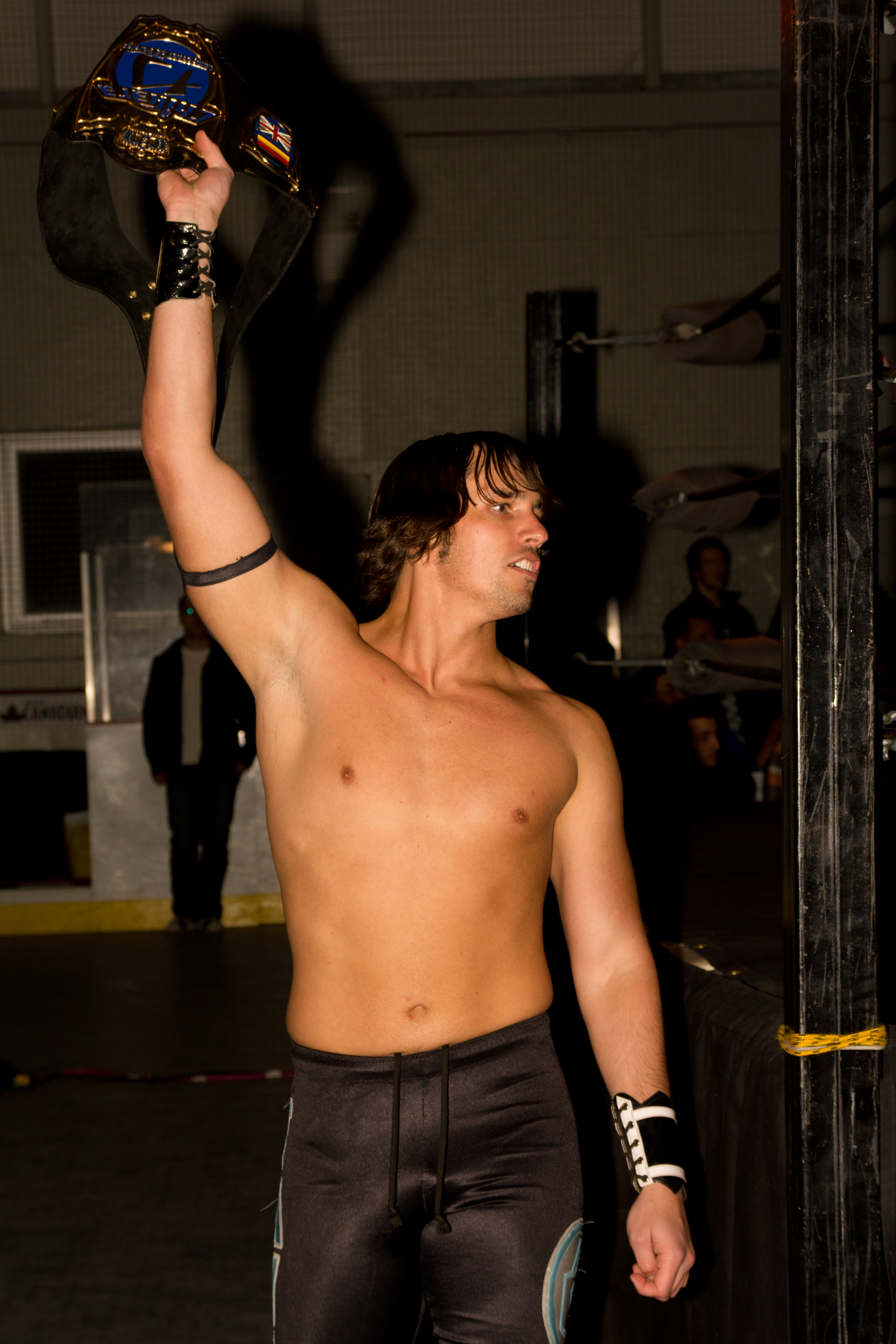
Taylor as one-half of the Chikara Campeones de Parejas in March 2012

- All Elite Wrestling
  - Dynamite Award (1 time)
    - Hardest Moment to Clean Up After (2021) – (Best Friends vs Santana and Ortiz) – Dynamite (September 16)
- Chaos Pro Wrestling
  - CPW Global Championship (2 times)
- Chikara
  - Campeonatos de Parejas (2 times) – with Johnny Gargano
  - Young Lions Cup V
  - King of Trios (2009) – with Icarus and Gran Akuma
  - Rey de Voladores (2007)
- Coliseum Championship Wrestling
  - CCW Heavyweight Championship (1 time)
  - CCW Lightweight Championship (2 times)
  - CCW Tag Team Championship (1 time) - with Ricochet
- Combat Zone Wrestling
  - CZW Junior Heavyweight Championship (1 time)
- DDT Pro-Wrestling
  - Ironman Heavymetalweight Championship (1 time)
- Evolve Wrestling
  - Evolve Tag Team Championship (1 time) – with Drew Galloway
  - Breakout Star (2010)
  - Evolve MVP (2010)
- Impact Pro Wrestling
  - Hall of Fame Classic (2017)
- Independent Wrestling Association Mid-South
  - IWA Mid-South Heavyweight Championship (2 times)
  - IWA Mid-South Light Heavyweight Championship (2 times)
  - IWA Mid-South Women's Championship (1 time)
- Insanity Pro Wrestling
  - IPW Junior Heavyweight Championship (1 time)
- Old School Wrestling
  - OSW Cruiserweight Championship (1 time)
- Pro Wrestling Guerrilla
  - PWG World Championship (2 times)
  - Dynamite Duumvirate Tag Team Title Tournament (2014) – with Trent?
- Pro Wrestling Illustrated
  - PWI ranked him No. 127 of the 500 best singles wrestlers in the PWI 500 in 2012
- United States Wrestling Organization
  - USWO Tag Team Championship (1 time) – with Slacker J

=== Luchas de Apuestas record ===
Winner (wager)	Loser (wager)	Location	Event	Date	Notes
Fire Ant and Soldier Ant (masks)	Chuck Taylor and Icarus (hair)	Philadelphia, Pennsylvania	Aniversario Yang	May 24, 2009	
