= Steve Gatorwolf =

American professional wrestler (1957–2017)

Personal information
- Born: Steve Ketcher; September 20, 1957 Grand Junction, Colorado, U.S.
- Died: 2017
- Cause of death: Heart Attack

Professional wrestling career
- Ring name(s): Steve Gatorwolf; Steve Stone; Masked Zodiac
- Billed height: 6 ft 1 in (1.85 m)
- Billed weight: 282 lb (128 kg)
- Debut: 1978
- Retired: circa 2006

Steve Ketcher (September 20, 1957 – 2017) was an American professional wrestler, promoter and convicted sex offender.

Ketcher worked as a professional wrestler under the ring name Steve Gatorwolf in the World Wrestling Federation during the 1980s.

Between April 2013 and March 2014, Ketcher was convicted of sexual crimes against a 15-year-old girl.

== Professional wrestling career ==
Born in Colorado but raised in Florida, Ketcher made his debut in the World Wrestling Federation in 1984 as Steve Gatorwolf using a Native American gimmick. He would only score victories over Terry Gibbs (wrestler), Rene Goulet, and Mr. X. He only made his only pay-per-view appearance at Saturday Night's Main Event V when he lost to King Kong Bundy in 41 seconds. In 1986, Gatorwolf would team up with Chief Jay Strongbow as The Indians. In 1987, Gatorwolf left the WWF and worked in the independents.

In January 1990, Gatorwolf worked for All Japan Pro Wrestling where he feuded with Goro Tsurumi.

Gatorwolf returned to the WWF in February 1990 when he lost to Ted DiBiase.

Later in his career, he worked in the independent circuit in Arizona and Utah until he retired around 2006.

== Legal issues ==
Gatorwolf was arrested in Utah in 2001 for aggravated assault and violation of a protection order. He was sentenced to a year in prison.

In May 2014, Gatorwolf turned himself in at a Jacksonville, Florida police station for a sexual assault crime with a 15-year-old girl in western Colorado. He was accused of assaulting a pre-teen girl in Colorado numerous times over several months beginning in April 2013.

In August 2015, Gatorwolf was sentenced to 16 years in prison.

== Personal life ==
Gatorwolf is Native American Cherokee. After wrestling, he became a truck driver and was a promoter for the American Wrestling Federation in Arizona. His son, Logan was also a wrestler.

He trained Navajo Warrior.

Gatorwolf passed away in 2017 in prison from a heart attack.

== Championships and accomplishments ==
- American Wrestling Federation
  - AWF Heavyweight Championship (7 times)
