= Brian Cage =

American professional wrestler (born 1984)

- Button at Death Before Dishonor 2026

Personal information
- Born: Brian Christopher Joseph Button; February 2, 1984 (age 42) Chico, California, U.S.
- Spouse: Melissa Santos (m. 2019)
- Children: 4

Professional wrestling career
- Ring name(s): Brian Cage; Barry Burke; Brian Cage-Taylor; Cage; Jonathan Cage; Kris Logan; Night Claw; Mortis II
- Billed height: 6 ft 0 in (1.83 m)
- Billed weight: 268 lb (122 kg)
- Billed from: "The 559"; Chico, California; Chino, California; Sacramento, California
- Trained by: Norman Smiley; Tom Prichard; Chris Kanyon; Oliver John
- Debut: July 15, 2005

Brian Christopher Joseph Button (born February 2, 1984), better known by the ring name Brian Cage, is an American professional wrestler and bodybuilder. He is signed to All Elite Wrestling (AEW), where he is a member of The Don Callis Family and a former one-time FTW Champion. He also performs in AEW's sister promotion Ring of Honor (ROH), where he is a former one-time ROH World Television Champion and a former two-time ROH World Six-Man Tag Team Champion.

Button signed with World Wrestling Entertainment in 2008 and was assigned to their farm territory Florida Championship Wrestling, where he worked as Kris Logan. He left the promotion the following year and began working in the American independent circuit, most notably Pro Wrestling Guerrilla as Brian Cage-Taylor. In 2014, Button was hired to appear in El Rey Network television series Lucha Underground, where he performed as Cage. Since Lucha Underground was created by Mexican promotion Lucha Libre AAA Worldwide, he appeared on several AAA shows. Also, Cage appeared on AAA's American partner Impact Wrestling where he is a former Impact World Champion and a former Impact X Division Champion.

== Early life ==
Brian Christopher Joseph Button was born on February 2, 1984, in Chico, California. He is a 2002 graduate of Pleasant Valley High School, the same year as Aaron Rodgers.

== Professional wrestling career ==
=== Early career (2004–2008) ===
Cage's love of professional wrestling and desire to be a wrestler began with watching it on television as a child. During those early years Cage became friends with Chris Kanyon following a show that was held in Sacramento at Arco Arena where he made a sign that Kanyon noticed. Kanyon then became Cage's biggest advocate in his decision to pursue professional wrestling as a career. This eventually led to him and his friends starting their own Federation in 2004 called Main-Event Wrestling Federation (MWF) in Chico, California. Cage's wrestling debut happened at an MWF show, against Kanyon. This eventually led to a second show where Kanyon once again faced Cage. Cage ended up winning both matches against Kanyon. During this time, Cage had been training at Pro Championship Wrestling. Also, Cage competed at All Pro Wrestling. This continued until Cage, under Kanyon's advice, left to move to Atlanta to be in WWE's then developmental territory Deep South Wrestling.

While not officially signed with Deep South Wrestling, Cage competed in matches with other WWE wrestlers. When WWE ended its ties with DSW, Cage left to come back to California. However, before Cage left, Kanyon asked Cage to become Mortis so that someday if Kanyon ever decided to make a comeback that he could still have his name out there. Cage is the only person other than Kanyon that has portrayed the Mortis character.

Cage again came back to California and worked with promotions such as All Pro Wrestling, Supreme Pro Wrestling, and Fog City Wrestling.

=== WWE (2008–2009) ===
In June 2008, WWE signed Cage to a developmental contract, he reported to their developmental territory Florida Championship Wrestling, based in Tampa. When Cage first started with FCW he was using the name Brian Cage but was eventually asked to change it and came up with the name Kris Logan. The name Kris Logan was made to give homage to Chris Kanyon, with the Logan part due to his similar appearance to the Marvel Comics character Wolverine, along with the outfit that he wore which sported yellow tights with claw marks. On July 23, 2009, Logan and Justin Gabriel defeated The Dude Busters (Caylen Croft and Trent Barreta) to become FCW Florida Tag Team Champions. However, they lost the title that same night against The Rotundos (Bo Rotundo and Duke Rotundo). Later, Cage would then come up with a new character Night Claw. The Night Claw character was seen in a few matches and was supposed to be used during the time that Hurricane was still active in WWE. However, this did not occur as Cage was eventually released from his contract in September 2009.

=== Independent circuit (2009–2020) ===
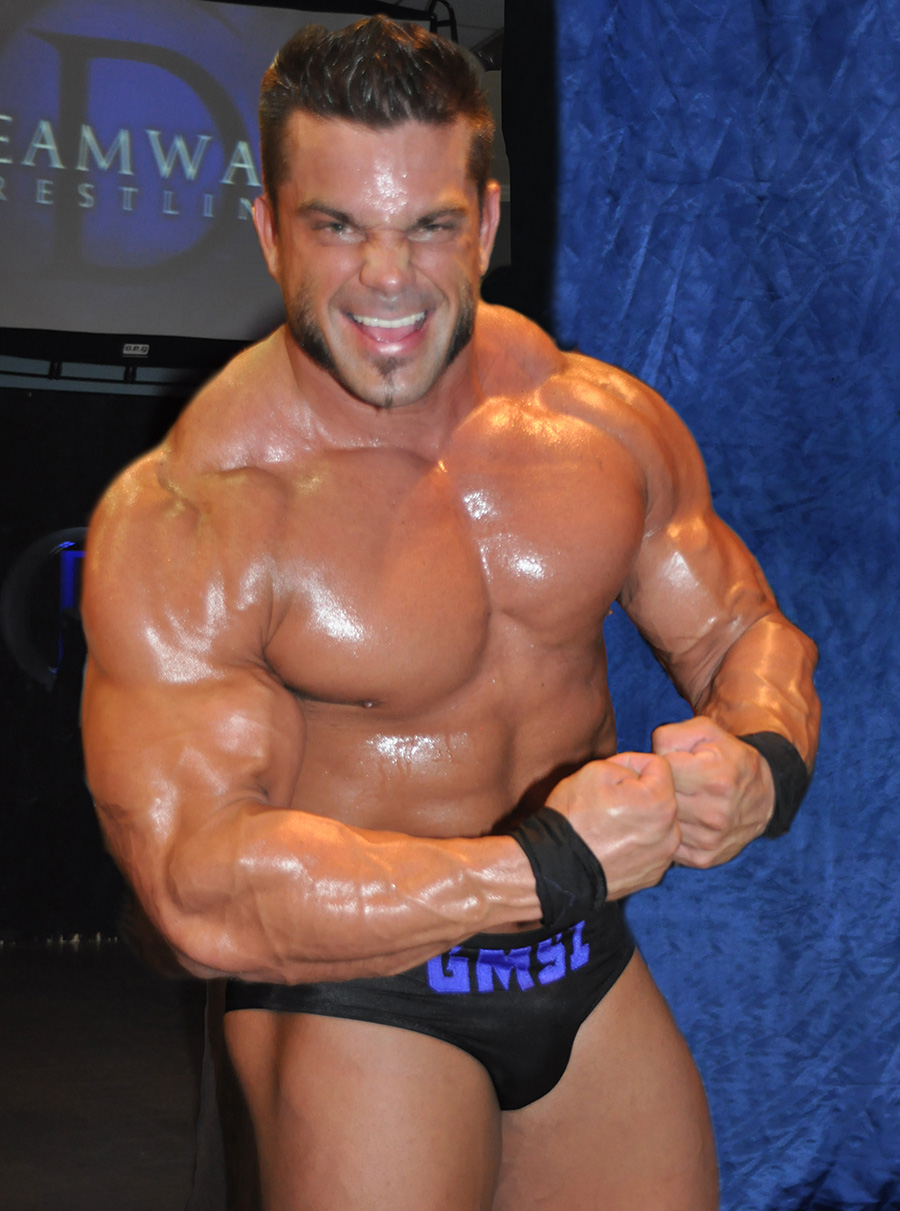
Cage at an independent event in 2014

Upon his release from WWE, Cage returned to the independent wrestling circuit and even competed in Asia. Cage would return to the Main Event Wrestling wrestling promotion where he would win the Main Event Wrestling California Cup where he beat Ryan Taylor, Joey Ryan, and finally T.J. Perkins. In October 2010, Cage wrestled and won a match against Kenny Dykstra at Main Event Wrestling in internet pay-per-view.

Cage would then join the NWA Hollywood promotion where he would team up with Shaun Ricker to form the tag team Natural Selection managed by Percy Pringle III. Towards the end of 2011, the team would split as Cage would feud with Ricker and would leave Cage as a single competitor.

Cage has also competed in other various promotions such as Future Stars of Wrestling. Cage had a feud with Brandon Gatson who would then compete against in a match on January 21, 2012, that was called the Match of the Year.

In May 2017, Cage started working for Japanese promotion Pro Wrestling Noah. On July 27, Cage unsuccessfully challenged Katsuhiko Nakajima for the GHC Heavyweight Championship.

=== Pro Wrestling Guerrilla ===
==== Fightin' Taylor Boys (2010–2012) ====
Cage made his Pro Wrestling Guerrilla debut on July 30, 2010, against Brandon Bonham at Seven in a losing effort. In his next match, he lost once more to Bonham in the opening round of the Battle of Los Angeles tournament. Soon after, Cage would form a stable with Chuck Taylor and Ryan Taylor known as the Fightin' Taylor Boys, adding the last name to his own and becoming Brian Cage-Taylor. The group found occasional success (with Brian and Ryan doing most of the teaming), but were never challengers to the World Tag Team Championship. Brian also competed in various singles matches during the time including a Joey Ryan Invitational at Dynamite Duumvirate Tag Team Title Tournament on March 4, 2011, but was eliminated by his teammate Ryan Taylor. The group quietly ended after losing to The RockNES Monsters in the opening round of the 2012 DDT4 tournament, and went their separate ways.

At Death to All But Metal on May 25, 2012, Cage (no longer using the "Taylor" moniker) received his first PWG World Championship title shot against champion Kevin Steen but lost. At Threemendous III on July 21, Cage defeated Eddie Edwards before interfering in Steen's title defense against Willie Mack, attacking both men. On September 1, on the first night of the Battle of Los Angeles, Cage defeated B-Boy to advance to the quarterfinal round before interfering in yet another Steen match, causing a non-title loss against Ricochet. The following day, Cage was eliminated from the tournament by Michael Elgin, following interference from Steen. At Failure to Communicate on October 27, Cage defeated Willie Mack, with whom he had been feuding since July.

==== Unbreakable F'N Machines (2013–2017) ====
On January 12, 2013, Cage and Michael Elgin formed a team called the Unbreakable F'N Machines (a name derived from both wrestlers' nicknames) and participated in the 2013 Dynamite Duumvirate Tag Team Title Tournament. In the opening round, they captured the PWG World Tag Team Championship by beating the previous year's winners, the Super Smash Bros. (Player Uno and Stupefied). However, they lost the championship to the eventual tournament winners The Young Bucks (Matt and Nick Jackson) in the semifinal round of the tournament later that same day. Unbreakable F'N Machines were regular fixtures in PWG's tag team division, competing in various tag team and six-man tag team matches throughout the year. Cage also continued to participate in singles competition, participating in that year's Battle of Los Angeles tournament, in which he defeated Tommaso Ciampa in the first round but lost to Drake Younger in the quarter-final.

Unbreakable F'N Machines participated in the 2014 Dynamite Duumvirate Tag Team Title Tournament on January 31, 2014, by defeating PPRay in the quarter-final but lost to The Inner City Machine Guns in the semi-final round. At Mystery Vortex II, Unbreakable F'N Machines defeated Inner City Machine Guns and African-American Wolves in a three-way match. Following that, the team quietly disbanded as Cage and Elgin went their separate ways. After winning three back-to-back matches in late 2014 and early 2015, Cage earned a PWG World Championship title shot against Roderick Strong in a three-way match, also involving Chris Hero at Dynamite Duumvirate Tag Team Title Tournament on May 22, 2015. However, Cage failed to win the title as he was pinned by Strong. Cage continued his domination in singles competition, leading to him participating in his fourth Battle of Los Angeles tournament in the 2015 edition in August. Cage defeated Aero Star in the first round but lost to Jack Evans in the second round.

Unbreakable F'N Machines reunited in PWG at All Star Weekend 11, winning their matches on both nights of the event, defeating The Wolves on the first night, and Johnny Gargano and Tommaso Ciampa on the second night. Cage sporadically competed in PWG in 2016, wrestling only twice that year. Unbreakable F'N Machines returned as a team in PWG again in 2017, wrestling three more matches. Cage would then participate in the 2017 Battle of Los Angeles tournament, marking his fifth appearance in the tournament. However, he was eliminated by Dezmond Xavier in the first round. Cage's last appearance to date in PWG occurred at All Star Weekend 13, where he lost to Morgan Webster.

=== Total Nonstop Action Wrestling (2012–2014) ===
Cage initially made an appearance for Total Nonstop Action Wrestling (TNA) on August 30, 2012 competing in a tryout dark match against Robbie E in a losing effort. The following year, Cage made another appearance on the January 10, 2013 edition of Impact Wrestling in another tryout match but through the company's short lived TNA Gut Check program in a losing effort against Jay Bradley. Cage would make another appearance in the year of 2014 during the summer at the June 26 Destination X taping special (aired the following month on July 31 in tape delay) in a triple threat match competing against Sanada and Crazzy Steve to qualify in the next round for the vacant TNA X Division Championship, but in a losing effort.

=== Lucha Underground (2014–2018) ===
On October 5, 2014, it was reported that Cage had signed with Lucha Underground. He debuted under the ring name Cage at the October 18 tapings winning a 4-way Elimination Match against Aero Star, Argenis and Angélico which was broadcast on January 14, 2015. Though he started the night seemingly as a dominant face, by the end of the night he attacked Prince Puma, cementing his status as a dominant heel. On the January 28 broadcast Cage received a shot at Puma's Lucha Underground Championship, but lost by disqualification, laying out both Puma and his manager Konnan afterwards. Weeks later, Cage defeated Puma in a non-title match to earn himself another title opportunity. The title match took place on the March 25 episode in a street fight, which saw Puma retain his title against Cage. He then started a feud against The Mack and defeated him in a "Falls Count Anywhere Match" at Ultima Lucha. In Season 2 of Lucha underground, Cage turned face and set his sights on Johnny Mundo. Mundo tried to attack Cage after his victory over the debuting Joey Ryan only for Cage to turn the tables and hit him with his Weapon X finisher on the 2/17 edition of Lucha Underground. The two subsequently faced each other a week later, with Mundo winning after a distraction from the debuting Taya. Cage was defeated by Matanza Cueto for the Lucha Underground Championship. Cage defeated Texano in the best of seven series which he won a gauntlet.

=== Lucha Libre AAA Worldwide (2015) ===
On February 27, 2015, Cage made his debut for the Mexican promotion Lucha Libre AAA Worldwide (AAA), pinning AAA Mega Champion El Patrón Alberto in a six-man tag team main event. On April 1, Cage defeated Alberto again with help from La Sociedad in a match that was originally scheduled to take place at Rey de Reyes. After the match, Cage demanded a shot at Alberto's title. The title match took place on June 14 at Verano de Escándalo, where Alberto was victorious via disqualification, afterwards demanding a steel cage Lucha de Apuestas with Cage. On August 9 at Triplemanía XXIII, Cage was defeated by Alberto in a Lucha de Apuestas and was afterwards, as per stipulation, forced to have his head shaved.

=== Return to Impact Wrestling (2018–2020) ===
==== X Division Champion (2018–2019) ====
On January 11, 2018, Cage returned to TNA and officially signed with TNA, now known as Impact Wrestling. On the February 15 episode of Impact!, Cage made his in-ring debut against John Cruz in a decisive victory. Cage would then briefly feud with Bobby Lashley after joining him as his mystery partner at the Crossroads special episode of Impact! against Ohio Versus Everything (Dave Crist and Jake Crist), a match which Cage and Lashley won. Lashley confronted Cage on competing in the match despite Lashley never asking for his help. This led to a match between the two on March 29 episode of Impact!, which Cage won, and marked Lashley's final appearance in Impact.

The following month, at Redemption, Cage made his pay-per-view debut in Impact by winning a six-way match against Dezmond Xavier, DJZ, El Hijo del Fantasma, Taiji Ishimori and Trevor Lee. At Under Pressure, Cage defeated Dezmond Xavier to become the #1 contender for the Impact X Division Championship. Cage received a title shot for the X Division Championship against Matt Sydal on the June 14 episode of Impact!, which Cage lost by count-out after an interfering Kongo Kong attacked him outside the ring. Cage would avenge that by defeating Kong on the July 5 episode of Impact!. Cage received a rematch against Sydal for the X Division Championship at Slammiversary XVI, which Cage won, thus winning his first championship in Impact. On the July 26 episode of Impact!, Cage made his first successful title defense in a rematch against Sydal. Cage also successfully defended his title against Fénix at ReDefined, and against Rich Swann on the October 18 episode of Impact!. At Bound for Glory, Cage teamed with Fénix and Pentagón Jr. against Ohio Versus Everything, which they lost after Sami Callihan pinned Cage, thus ending his undefeated streak.

On the November 15 episode of Impact!, Cage successfully retained the X Division Championship against Callihan. After the match, Cage invoked "Option C", a choice open only to the X Division Championship holder, where they surrender the title, in favor of receiving a title match for the Impact World Championship at Homecoming on January 6, 2019, where he lost to champion Johnny Impact.

==== Impact World Champion (2019–2020) ====
On the March 15 episode of Impact, Cage saved Johnny Impact from Killer Kross and Moose, but Impact turned on Cage after Impact's wife Taya Valkyrie would low blow Cage allowing Impact to attack him.

Part of the ongoing feud involved the referee Johnny Bravo where two weeks prior to the Rebellion show, it emerged that he now had allegiances to Johnny Impact and his wife Taya Valkyrie as he chop-blocked Cage when Cage was in a position to pick up a pinfall win over Impact. The previous week Bravo screwed Cage in a match with Killer Kross where he called for the bell indicating a successful pinfall when it was clear to the Audience & commentators present and the TV viewers at home that Cage had barely got a shoulder up before the referee hit the mat with his hand for the third count.

At Impact Wrestling Rebellion PPV on April 28, Cage defeated Impact and became Impact World Champion for the first time. Following the match, he was attacked by the debuting Michael Elgin. During the match, Cage suffered a back injury after a Spanish Fly from the ramp to the arena floor. Due to the injury, Cage missed two days of television tapings that took place over the following week. He returned to the ring on May 12.

On the Impact TV broadcasts, Cage made his return at Slammiversary where he would once again face Michael Elgin. Despite being successful in his title defense, Cage once again was to be sidelined, with the show highlighting the cause as the same back injury which had limited him to just the once defense since he captured the title from Johnny Impact. Cage would not be seen at the arena events for some time with sporadic updates from his on-screen girlfriend Melissa Santos. Cage was next seen during the August and September tapings.

During the Las Vegas tapings, Cage announced that he was medically cleared to return to the ring at Bound for Glory where he would be facing new number one contender Sami Callihan. As part of the buildup to the match, Callihan confronted Cage, interrupting his "first dance" in the ring with Melissa after their on-screen wedding earlier in the broadcast. Following a vile insult, Cage started to attack Callihan, who attempted to strike Cage with a bottle he was holding, but Melissa Santos instead took a direct Hit from Callihan. At the PPV, Cage was able to retain his title; however, on the October 25, 2019 tapings, Callihan got a rematch with it being held in a steel cage this time. Cage lost the title by pinfall following a Super Pile Driver from the ropes. At Hard to Kill, Cage was set to face Rob Van Dam. The match ended in a no-contest after Cage was too injured to continue after RVD hit a Van Terminator with a chair against Cage’s face. When the officials stopped the match, RVD wanted to keep going, and Daga ran in to protect Cage. RVD attacked Daga, and another match was made. After the pay-per-view, Cage revealed his Impact Wrestling contract had expired, ending his tenure with the company. Cage also revealed he would be taking time off from wrestling to undergo surgery for an injury.

=== All Elite Wrestling / Ring of Honor ===
==== Team Taz (2020–2021) ====
It was reported on January 12, 2020 that Cage had signed with All Elite Wrestling (AEW). Cage made his debut for the company at the Double or Nothing pay-per-view on May 23, as the surprise final entrant in the Casino Ladder Match, where he was accompanied by his new cornerman Taz, thus establishing himself as a heel. He won the match, thus becoming the number one contender for the AEW World Championship. Afterwards, Taz would crown Cage with the FTW World Championship, an unofficial championship introduced by Taz, and Cage would target Jon Moxley, the AEW World Champion. He would challenge Moxley for the championship at Fight for the Fallen on July 15, but lost after Taz threw in the towel. On the 21 July episode of Dark, Cage formed an alliance with Ricky Starks after they attacked Robert Anthony and Darby Allin after their match. The team, managed by Taz and now known as Team Taz, began feuding with Darby Allin as they faced Allin and Jon Moxley on the July 29 episode of Dynamite where they were defeated. On September 5, Cage competed in the 21-man Casino Battle Royale at All Out, but was eliminated by the eventual winner Lance Archer.

On the October 7 episode of Dynamite, Cage successfully defended the FTW Championship when he defeated Will Hobbs. The next month, Hobbs would align himself with Cage, Taz and Starks after he struck Cody Rhodes with Cage's FTW championship belt and then helped them attack both Allin and Rhodes. On the December 2, 2020 special Winter Is Coming, Starks and Hobbs, now known as Powerhouse Hobbs, would lose a tag team match to Cody Rhodes and Darby Allin, after which, Cage, Hobbs, and Starks all attacked Rhodes and Allin until Sting made his AEW debut and ran Team Taz off. At New Year's Smash night two, Cage was defeated by Allin thus failing to win the AEW TNT Championship. On the January 21 edition of Dynamite, it was announced that Cage and Ricky Starks would be facing Darby Allin and Sting in a street fight at Revolution, which they lost. On the March 17 edition of Dynamite, Brian Cage showed signs of a face turn by coming out and showing respect to Sting much to the annoyance of Taz and the rest of Team Taz.

On the April 28 episode of Dynamite, Cage defeated Adam Page, which led to a feud between the two. At Double or Nothing, Cage was defeated by Page in a rematch. On July 14, 2021, at Fyter Fest night one, Cage lost the FTW World Championship to Ricky Starks after being hit in the head with the title belt by Powerhouse Hobbs, effectively being kicked out of Team Taz and ending his reign at a record-setting of 377 days. Cage and Starks had a rematch for the title on the October 8 episode of Rampage in a Philadelphia street fight, which Cage lost.

==== The Embassy / Mogul Embassy; Cage of Agony (2022–2024) ====
On April 1, 2022, Cage appeared at Supercard of Honor XV, an event promoted by AEW's sister promotion Ring of Honor (ROH). At the event, Cage was revealed as the new client of Tully Blanchard and defeated Ninja Mack. Cage later aligned with the Gates of Agony (Toa Liona and Kaun) with the group being collectively referred to as "Tully Blanchard Enterprises". On July 23, 2022, at Death Before Dishonor, Prince Nana announced he had purchased Tully Blanchard Enterprises and reformed The Embassy, with Cage, Kaun and Liona. They would go on to defeat the team of Alex Zayne, Blake Christian and Tony Deppen during the pre-show. On the November 2 episode of Rampage, Cage faced Samoa Joe for the ROH World Television Championship in a losing effort. At Final Battle, Cage, Liona and Kaun, defeated Dalton Castle and The Boys, to win the ROH World Six-Man Tag Team Championship.

On March 30, 2023, it was confirmed by Dave Meltzer of Wrestling Observer Newsletter that his deal had expired. On April 1, it was reported that Cage signed a new five-year deal with AEW. At Rampage:Grand Slam, The Embassy lost the ROH World Six-Man Tag Team Championships to The Elite members "Hangman" Adam Page and The Young Bucks. On November 1 edition of Dynamite, The Embassy regained the ROH World Six-Man Tag Team Championships from The Elite.

On January 17, 2024, Cage and the Gates of Agony dropped the ROH World Six-Man Tag Team Championship to the Bullet Club Gold (Jay White and The Gunns (Austin Gunn and Colten Gunn)). On the May 8 episode of Dynamite, Cage and the Gates of Agony turned on their leader Swerve Strickland, disbanding the Embassy in the process. On the May 25 episode of Rampage, Cage and the Gates of Agony revealed their new team name to be "Cage of Agony".

==== Don Callis Family (2024–present) ====
On October 12 at WrestleDream, Cage defeated Atlantis Jr. to win the ROH World Television Championship for the first time. On the following episode of Dynamite, Cage left Cage of Agony and joined the Don Callis Family and formed a tag team with fellow member Lance Archer, later known as "The Murder Machines". At Final Battle on December 20, Cage lost his title to Komander in a Survival of the Fittest, ending his reign at 69 days. In April 2025, it was reported that Cage had torn his quadriceps at an independent show, rendering him out of action for up to a year. Cage returned from injury on the May 13, 2026 episode of Dynamite, unsuccessfully challenging Kevin Knight for the TNT Championship.

== Other media ==
Cage, along with tag partner Lance Archer and Chavo Guerrero Jr., appeared in Steven Spielberg's science fiction film Disclosure Day.

== Personal life ==
In 2016, Button began dating Melissa Santos, who worked for Lucha Underground as a ring announcer. The couple have a daughter and a son together. The couple married on July 12, 2019. The marriage was also honored during the August and September Impact Wrestling broadcasts, with the show holding their own ceremony (chaired by Father James Mitchell) following from Cage's on-screen proposal earlier in the tapings. He was previously married to another woman and also has a son named Noah born in 2006 from a previous relationship.

== Championships and accomplishments ==
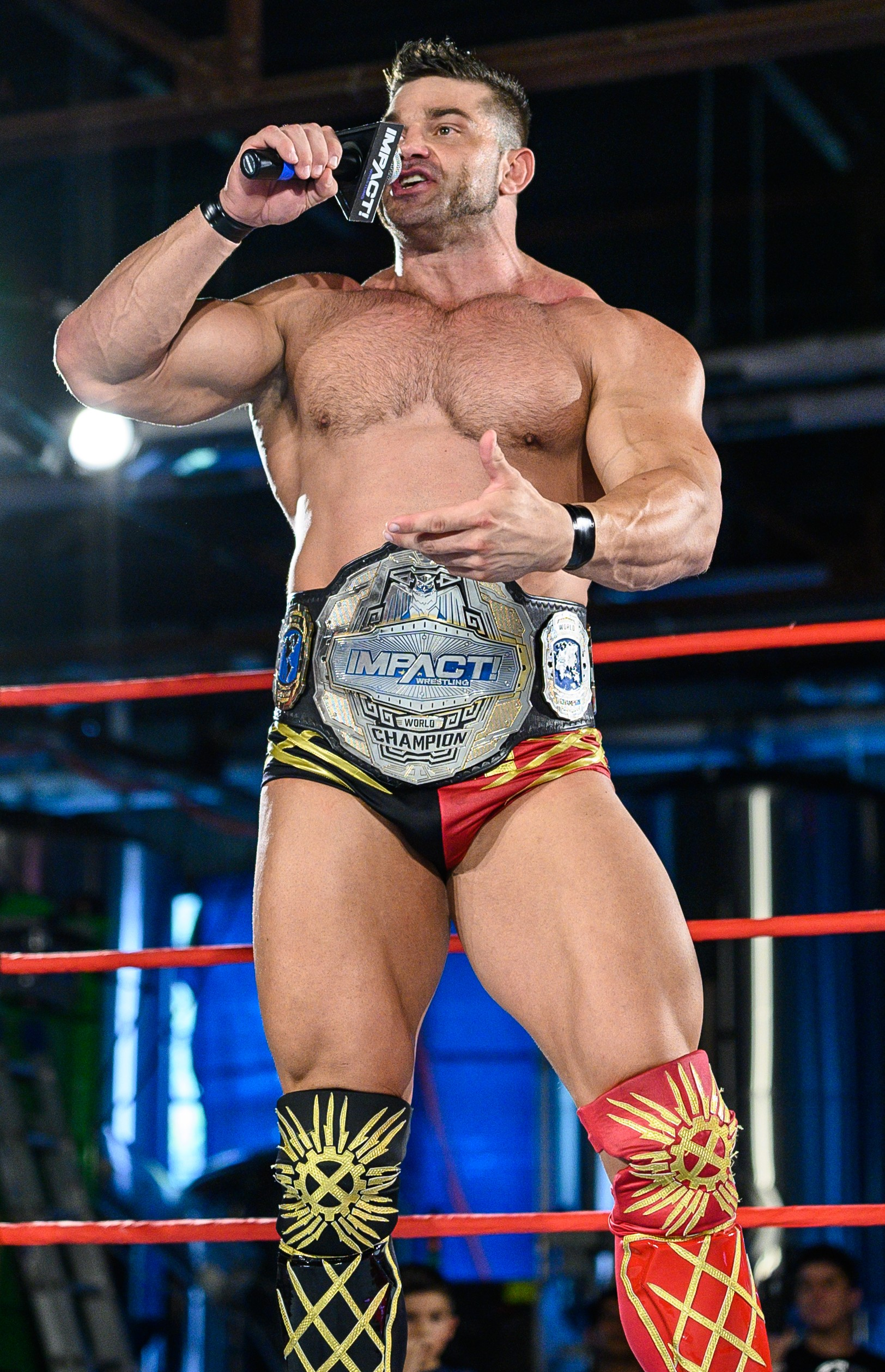
Cage is a former Impact World Champion.

- All Elite Wrestling
  - FTW Championship (1 time)
  - Casino Ladder Match (2020)
- All Pro Wrestling
  - APW Worldwide Internet Championship (1 time)
- Championship Wrestling from Hollywood
  - NWA Heritage Tag Team Championship (2 times) – with Shaun Ricker
- DDT Pro-Wrestling
  - Ironman Heavymetalweight Championship (1 time)
- Dungeon Championship Wrestling
  - DCW Heavyweight Championship (1 time)
- FEST Wrestling
  - Love Cup (2017) – with Sami Callihan
- Florida Championship Wrestling
  - FCW Florida Tag Team Championship (1 time) – with Justin Gabriel
- Future Stars of Wrestling
  - FSW Heavyweight Championship (1 time)
  - FSW Heavyweight Title #1 Contendership (2014)
- Impact Wrestling
  - Impact World Championship (1 time)
  - Impact X Division Championship (1 time)
  - Impact Year End Award (1 time)
    - X Division Star of the Year (2018)
- International Wrestling Federation
  - IWF World Championship (1 time, inaugural)
  - IWF World Title Tournament (2015)
- Lucha Libre AAA Worldwide
  - Lucha Libre World Cup (2016 Men's Division) – with Chavo Guerrero Jr. and Johnny Mundo
- Lucha Underground
  - Lucha Underground Gift of the Gods Championship (1 time)
  - Ultimate Opportunity Championship (1 time)
- Main Event Wrestling
  - California Cup (2011)
- Mayhem Wrestling Entertainment
  - MWE Heavyweight Championship (1 time)
- Match One Wrestling
  - M1W Tag Team Championship (1 time) – with Shaun Ricker
  - M1W Tag Team Championship Tournament (2010) – with Shaun Ricker
- North America Wrestling
  - NAW North America Championship (1 time)
- Piledriver Pro Wrestling
  - PPW Heavyweight Championship (1 time)
- Pro Wrestling Guerrilla
  - PWG World Tag Team Championship (1 time) – with Michael Elgin
- Pro Wrestling Illustrated
  - Faction of the Year (2025) as part of the Don Callis Family
  - Most Improved Wrestler of the Year (2019)
  - Ranked No. 48 of the top 500 singles wrestlers in the PWI 500 in 2019
- Pro Championship Wrestling
  - PCW Inter-California Championship (1 time)
- Pro Wrestling Revolution
  - PWR Junior Heavyweight Championship (1 time)
- Ring of Honor
  - ROH World Television Championship (1 time)
  - ROH World Six-Man Tag Team Championship (2 times) – with Kaun and Toa Liona
- Warrior Wrestling
  - Warrior Wrestling Championship (1 time)
- WrestleCircus
  - WC Ringmaster Championship (2 times)
  - WC Sideshow Championship (1 time)
- World Series Wrestling
  - WSW World Heavyweight Championship (2 times, current)
  - WSW Australian Championship (1 time)
  - WSW Tag Team Championship (1 time) – with Flip Gordon
  - First Triple Crown Champion
  - WSW Hall of Fame (Class of 2023)
- Xtreme Pro Wrestling
  - XPW World Heavyweight Championship (1 time)
  - XPW World Heavyweight Title Tournament (2021)

== Luchas de Apuestas record ==
| Winner (wager) | Loser (wager) | Location | Event | Date | Notes |
|---|---|---|---|---|---|
| El Patrón Alberto (hair) | Brian Cage (hair) | Mexico City | Triplemanía XXIII | August 9, 2015 | |
