= 2023 in professional wrestling =

2023 in professional wrestling describes the year's events in the world of professional wrestling.

== List of notable promotions ==
These promotions held notable events throughout 2023.

Promotion Name	Abbreviation	Notes
Active Advance Pro Wrestling	2AW	
All Elite Wrestling	AEW	
All Japan Pro Wrestling	AJPW	
Consejo Mundial de Lucha Libre	CMLL	
CyberFight	CF	CyberFight is an umbrella brand that oversees and promotes four individual promotions: DDT Pro-Wrestling (DDT), Ganbare☆Pro-Wrestling (GanPro), Pro Wrestling Noah (Noah), and Tokyo Joshi Pro Wrestling (TJPW).
Dragongate Japan Pro-Wrestling	Dragongate	
Empire Wrestling Federation	EWF	
Frontier Martial-Arts Wrestling-Explosion	FMW-E	
Game Changer Wrestling	GCW	
Gleat	—	
Ice Ribbon	—	
Impact Wrestling	Impact	
Juggalo Championship Wrestling	JCW	
Lucha Libre AAA Worldwide	AAA	The "AAA" abbreviation has been used since the mid-1990s and had previously stood for the promotion's original name Asistencia Asesoría y Administración.
Major League Wrestling	MLW	
National Wrestling Alliance	NWA	
New Japan Pro-Wrestling	NJPW	
Pro Wrestling Guerrilla	PWG	
Pro Wrestling Zero1	Zero1	
Revolution Pro Wrestling	RevPro	
Ring of Honor	ROH	
Tenryu Project	—	
Women of Wrestling	WOW	
World Wonder Ring Stardom	Stardom	
WWE	—	"WWE" stands for World Wrestling Entertainment, which remains the company's legal name, though the company ceased using the full name in April 2011, with the WWE abbreviation becoming an orphaned initialism. WWE divided its roster into three storyline divisions – referred to as brands where wrestlers exclusively performed on their respective weekly television programs. Raw and SmackDown were their two main brands, while NXT served as their developmenal territory.

== Calendar of notable shows ==
=== January ===
Date	Promotion(s)	Event	Location	Main Event	Notes
1	CF: Noah	The New Year 2023	Tokyo, Japan	Shinsuke Nakamura defeated The Great Muta	
1	CMLL	Sin Salida	Mexico City, Mexico	Valiente Jr. defeated Apocalipsis in a Mask vs. Mask Steel Cage match	
2	AJPW	New Year Giant Series; Day 1	Tokyo, Japan	Takuya Nomura won 22-person battle royal.	
3	AJPW	New Year Giant Series; Day 2	Tokyo, Japan	Kento Miyahara (c) defeated Takuya Nomura to retain the Triple Crown Heavyweight Championship	
4	NJPW	Wrestle Kingdom 17; Night 1	Tokyo, Japan	Kazuchika Okada defeated Jay White (c) to win the IWGP World Heavyweight Championship	The event honoured NJPW's founder Antonio Inoki, who died on October 1, 2022. Featured Keiji Muto's last match in NJPW.
4	CF: TJPW	Tokyo Joshi Pro '23	Tokyo, Japan	Yuka Sakazaki (c) defeated Miyu Yamashita to retain the Princess of Princess Championship	
4	GCW	Save Me	Chicago, Illinois	The H8 Club (Nick Gage and Matt Tremont) defeated The East West Express (Jordan Oliver and Nick Wayne)	
5	NJPW	New Year Dash!!	Tokyo, Japan	Kazuchika Okada and Kenny Omega defeated United Empire (Aaron Henare and Jeff Cobb)	
6	AEW	Battle of the Belts V	Portland, Oregon	Orange Cassidy (c) defeated Kip Sabian to retain the AEW All-Atlantic Championship	
7	MLW	Blood and Thunder	Philadelphia, Pennsylvania	Jacob Fatu defeated Ben-K	
7	PWG	Battle of Los Angeles	Los Angeles, California	Bandido defeated Black Taurus and El Hijo del Vikingo in the first round of the 2023 Battle of Los Angeles tournament	
8	PWG	Battle of Los Angeles	Los Angeles, California	Mike Bailey defeated Konosuke Takeshita in the final of the 2023 Battle of Los Angeles tournament	
8	CF: Noah	Reboot 2022	Tokyo, Japan	Katsuhiko Nakajima and Seiki Yoshioka defeated Satoshi Kojima and Shuji Kondo	
8	CF: Noah	New Sunrise 2022	Tokyo, Japan	Jake Lee defeated Yoshiki Inamura	
8	AJPW; Gleat	Gleat Ver. 5	Osaka, Japan	Kaito Ishida defeated El Lindaman (c) to win the G-Rex Championship	
9	AJPW; 2AW	AJPW x 2AW; Week 1	Chiba, Japan	60 Seconds (Jun Tonsho and Tetsuya Izuchi) defeated The Rule (Ayato Yoshida and Naka Shuma)	
9	CF: Noah	Sunny Voyage	Yokohama, Japan	Kaito Kiyomiya defeated Amakusa	
10	WWE: NXT	New Year's Evil	Orlando, Florida	Gigi Dolin and Jacy Jayne co-won a 20-woman battle royal to determine the number one contender for the NXT Women's Championship	Aired as a special episode of NXT.
11	AJPW	New Year Giant Series; Day 3	Yokohama, Japan	Kaz Hayashi, Kento Miyahara, and Rising Hayato defeated Atsuki Aoyagi, Naoya Nomura, and Yuma Aoyagi	
11	Dragongate	Open the New Year Gate; Day 4	Tokyo, Japan	Z-Brats (Shun Skywalker, KAI, BxB Hulk, H.Y.O and Ishin) (c) defeated HIGH-END (YAMATO, Dragon Kid, Kagetora, Takashi Yoshida and Problem Dragon) in a Unit Disbands match	
12	Dragongate	Open the New Year Gate; Day 5	Tokyo, Japan	Shun Skywalker defeated Yuki Yoshioka (c) to win the Open the Dream Gate Championship	
13	Impact	Hard To Kill	Atlanta, Georgia	Mickie James defeated Jordynne Grace (c) in a Title vs. Career match to win the Impact Knockouts World Championship	
15	AJPW; 2AW	AJPW x 2AW; Week 2	Chiba, Japan	Atsuki Aoyagi, Naoya Nomura, and Yuma Aoyagi defeated Kento Miyahara, Kotaro Suzuki, and Rising Hayato	
15	CF: Noah	Sunny Voyage	Fuji, Japan	Kongo (Hajime Ohara, Hi69, Katsuhiko Nakajima, Kenoh, and Shuji Kondo) defeated Amakusa, Dante Leon, Naomichi Marufuji, Ninja Mack, and Satoshi Kojima	
18	ROH	Jay Briscoe Tribute and Celebration of Life	Fresno, California	Claudio Castagnoli (c) defeated Christopher Daniels to retain the ROH World Championship	
20	Stardom	New Blood 7	Tokyo, Japan	God's Eye (Mirai and Tomoka Inaba) defeated wing★gori (Saya Iida and Hanan) in a New Blood Tag Team Championship inaugural tournament quarterfinals match	
20	GCW	Don't Talk to Me	Concord, North Carolina	El Hijo del Vikingo defeated Gringo Loco	
21	NJPW; CF: Noah	Wrestle Kingdom 17; Night 2	Yokohama, Japan	Tetsuya Naito defeated Kenoh	
21	GCW	Take A Picture	Huntsville, Alabama	Los Mazicos (Ciclope and Miedo Extremo) (c) defeated The East West Express (Jordan Oliver and Nick Wayne) to retain the GCW Tag Team Championship	
22	NJPW	The New Beginning in Nagoya	Nagoya, Japan	Shingo Takagi (c) defeated Great-O-Khan to retain the Provisional KOPW 2023 Championship	
22	CF: Noah	The Great Muta Final "Bye-Bye"	Yokohama, Japan	The Great Muta, Sting, and Darby Allin defeated Hakushi, Akira, and Naomichi Marufuji	Featured The Great Muta's final Noah appearance.
22	AJPW	New Year Giant Series; Day 4	Tokyo, Japan	Naoya Nomura and Yuma Aoyagi defeated Kento Miyahara and Takuya Nomura (c) to win the World Tag Team Championship	
23	WWE: Raw; SmackDown	Raw is XXX	Philadelphia, Pennsylvania	Austin Theory (c) defeated Bobby Lashley in a No Disqualification match to retain the WWE United States Championship	A television special commemorating the 30th anniversary of Raw.
27	CMLL	Rey Del Aire VIP 2023	Mexico City, Mexico	Dragón Rojo Jr. defeated Gran Guerrero, Atlantis Jr., Bárbaro Cavernario, Fugaz, Místico, Panterita del Ring Jr., Soberano Jr., Stuka Jr., and Templario to win the 2023 Rey Del Aire VIP	
28	WWE: Raw; SmackDown	Royal Rumble	San Antonio, Texas	Roman Reigns (c) defeated Kevin Owens to retain the Undisputed WWE Universal Championship	
29	CF: DDT	Sweet Dreams! 2023	Tokyo, Japan	Yuji Hino defeated Kazusada Higuchi to win the KO-D Openweight Championship	
30	CF: TJPW	Beyond The Origins, Into The Future	Tokyo, Japan	Rika Tatsumi defeated Shoko Nakajima to win the Princess Of The Decade Tournament	
31	AJPW	AJPW x Heat Up	Tokyo, Japan	Daisuke Kanehira (c) defeated Akira Jo to retain the Heat Up Universal Championship	
(c) – denotes defending champion(s)

=== February ===
Date	Promotion(s)	Event	Location	Main Event	Notes
3	NJPW	Tamashii	Sydney, Australia	Robbie Eagles defeated Aaron Solo	
4	NJPW	Tamashii	Melbourne, Victoria, Australia	Caveman Ugg defeated Aaron Henare	
4	WWE: NXT	Vengeance Day	Charlotte, North Carolina	Bron Breakker (c) defeated Grayson Waller in a Steel Cage match to retain the NXT Championship	
4	Stardom	Supreme Fight 2023	Osaka, Japan	Giulia (c) defeated Suzu Suzuki to retain the World of Stardom Championship	
4	CF: Noah	Sunny Voyage	Maebashi, Japan	GLG (Jack Morris and Jake Lee) defeated Kaito Kiyomiya and Yoshiki Inamura	
4	MLW	SuperFight	Philadelphia, Pennsylvania	Matthew Justice defeated Microman, Mance Warner, and Real1 in a dumpster match with Duke Droese as special guest referee	
4	AJPW	Excite Maniax; Day 1	Tokyo, Japan	Kento Miyahara (c) defeated Yuma Aoyagi to retain the Triple Crown Heavyweight Championship	
4	NJPW	The New Beginning in Sapporo	Sapporo, Japan	Tetsuya Naito defeated Shota Umino	
5	NJPW	The New Beginning in Sapporo	Sapporo, Japan	Hiromu Takahashi (c) defeated Yoh to retain the IWGP Junior Heavyweight Championship	
5	AAA	Rey de Reyes	Mérida, Mexico	Sam Adonis defeated Bandido, Pagano, and Hijo del Vikingo in a four-way match to win the Rey de Reyes tournament	
5	CF: Noah	Star Navigation; Night 1	Tokyo, Japan	El Hijo de Dr. Wagner Jr. (c) defeated Manabu Soya to retain the GHC National Championship	
10	CMLL	Torneo Increible De Parejas; Week 1	Mexico City, Mexico	Soberano Jr. and Templario defeated Dragón Rojo Jr. and Titán in a semi final for the 2023 Torneo Increible De Parejas	
10	MLW; AAA	Super Series	Tijuana, Baja California	Hijo Del Vikingo, Psycho Clown, and Rey Horus defeated Johnny Caballero and La Empresa (Gringo Loco and Sam Adonis)	
11	NJPW	The New Beginning in Osaka	Osaka, Japan	Kazuchika Okada (c) defeated Shingo Takagi to retain the IWGP World Heavyweight Championship	
11	NWA	Nuff Said	Tampa, Florida	Tyrus (c) defeated Matt Cardona to retain the NWA Worlds Heavyweight Championship	
11	CF: TJPW	Futari Wa Princess Max Heart Tournament 2023 Finals	Tokyo, Japan	121000000 (Maki Ito and Miyu Yamashita) defeated Kyoraku Kyomei (Hyper Misao and Shoko Nakajima) to win the 2023 Futari Wa Princess Max Heart Tournament	
12	CF: Noah	Great Voyage in Osaka 2023	Osaka, Japan	Kaito Kiyomiya (c) defeated Jack Morris to retain the GHC Heavyweight Championship	
12	AJPW; Tenryu Project	Genichiro Tenryu Aid	Tokyo, Japan	Keita Yano, Masayuki Kono, and Minoru Suzuki defeated Hikaru Sato, Kengo Mashimo, and Rey Paloma	
16	AJPW; Tenryu Project	Wrestle And Romance	Tokyo, Japan	Hikaru Sato (c) defeated Naoki Tanizaki to retain the Tenryu Project International Junior Heavyweight Championship	
17	CMLL	Torneo Increible De Parejas; Week 2	Mexico City, Mexico	Místico and Averno defeated Soberano Jr. and Templario to win the 2023 Torneo Increible De Parejas	
18	NJPW	Battle in the Valley	San Jose, California	Kazuchika Okada (c) defeated Hiroshi Tanahashi to retain the IWGP World Heavyweight Championship	Featured the NJPW/Stardom in-ring debut of Mercedes Moné, formerly Sasha Banks in WWE.
18	WWE: Raw; SmackDown	Elimination Chamber	Montreal, Quebec, Canada	Roman Reigns (c) defeated Sami Zayn to retain the Undisputed WWE Universal Championship	First major WWE event in Montreal since 2009.
18	GCW	Middle of the Night	Los Angeles, California	Nick Gage (c) defeated Mike Bailey to retain the GCW World Championship	
19	AJPW	Excite Maniax; Day 2	Tokyo, Japan	Yuji Nagata defeated Kento Miyahara (c) to win the Triple Crown Heavyweight Championship	
21	CF: Noah	Keiji Muto Grand Final Pro-Wrestling "Last" Love	Tokyo, Japan	Masahiro Chono defeated Keiji Muto	Featured the Keiji Muto, Nosawa Rongai, and Masahiro Chono's retirement matches.
22	NJPW; CMLL	Fantastica Mania	Takamatsu, Japan	Atlantis Jr. and Último Guerrero defeated Hiroshi Tanahashi and Místico	
23	NJPW; CMLL	Fantastica Mania	Kyoto, Japan	Atlantis Jr. and Templario defeated Volador Jr. and Místico	
24	NJPW; CMLL	Fantastica Mania	Osaka, Japan	Volador Jr. and Último Guerrero defeated Magia Blanca and Atlantis Jr.	
24	Impact	No Surrender	Sunrise Manor, Nevada	Josh Alexander (c) defeated Rich Swann to retain the Impact World Championship	
25	AJPW	BAR045 5th Anniversary	Yokohama, Japan	Drew Parker, Isami Kodaka, and Rina Yamashita defeated Asuka, Jun Kasai, and Takashi Sasaki	
26	CF: DDT	Into The Fight 2023	Tokyo, Japan	Yukio Naya defeated Harashima to become the #1 contender to the KO-D Openweight Championship	
26	Stardom	Stardom in Showcase vol.4	Kobe, Japan	Stars (Mayu Iwatani, Hazuki, and Koguma) defeated Queen's Quest (Utami Hayashishita, Saya Kamitani, and Miyu Amasaki) and Oedo Tai (Natsuko Tora, Starlight Kid, and Momo Watanabe)	
26	AJPW	Excite Maniax; Day 3	Maebashi, Japan	Yuji Nagata, Yutaka Yoshie, and Yuma Anzai defeated Suwama, Jun Saito, and Rei Saito	
26	NJPW; CMLL	Fantastica Mania	Chiba, Japan	Los Guerreros de la Atlantida (Atlantis Jr. and Último Guerrero) defeated Los Ingobernables de Japon (Bushi and Titán) to win the Interfaction Tag Team Tournament	
27	AJPW	Excite Maniax; Day 4	Tokyo, Japan	Shuji Ishikawa, Atsuki Aoyagi, and Yuma Anzai defeated Yuji Nagata, Hikaru Sato, and Dan Tamura	
27	NJPW; CMLL	Fantastica Mania	Tokyo, Japan	Titán (c) defeated Soberano Jr. to retain the CMLL World Welterweight Championship	
28	NJPW; CMLL	Fantastica Mania	Tokyo, Japan	Místico defeated Atlantis Jr.	
(c) – denotes defending champion(s)

=== March ===
Date	Promotion(s)	Event	Location	Main Event	Notes
1	NJPW	All Star Junior Festival 2023	Tokyo, Japan	Master Wato defeated Atsuki Aoyagi	
2	Dragongate	Rey de Parejas Finals	Tokyo, Japan	D'Courage (Yuki Yoshioka and Madoka Kikuta) defeated M3K (Susumu Mochizuki and Yasushi Kanda) to win the Rey de Parejas tournament	
3	CMLL	Torneo Increible De Escuelas (Finals)	Mexico City, Mexico	Ángel de Oro, Místico, and Volador Jr. defeated Atlantis Jr., Oraculo, and Rocky Romero	Team Escuela Guadalajara won the 2023 Torneo Increible De Escuelas.
4	Stardom	Triangle Derby Finals	Tokyo, Japan	Prominence (Suzu Suzuki, Risa Sera, and Hiragi Kurumi) (c) defeated Abarenbo GE (Syuri, Mirai, and Ami Sourei) to win the Triangle Derby finals and retain the Artist of Stardom Championship	
4	Dragongate	Champion Gate 2023; Night 1	Osaka, Japan	Gold Class (Kota Minoura, Ben-K and BxB Hulk) (c) defeated M3K (Susumu Mochizuki, Yasushi Kanda and Mochizuki Jr.) to retain the Open the Triangle Gate Championship	
4	NWA; AAA	The World is a Vampire: NWA vs. AAA	Mexico City, Mexico	Tyrus (c) defeated Daga to retain the NWA Worlds Heavyweight Championship	The match was cut short when Daga suffered a legitimate leg injury.
4	GCW	Holy Smokes	Atlantic City, New Jersey	John Wayne Murdoch defeated Drew Parker in a Texas Deathmatch	
5	Zero1	22nd Anniversary	Tokyo, Japan	Masato Tanaka (c) defeated Shoki Kitamura to retain the World Heavyweight Championship	
5	AJPW	Over The Future 7	Kawasaki, Japan	Manabu Hara and Tamura defeated Kotaro Nasu and Madeline	
5	AEW	Revolution	San Francisco, California	MJF (c) defeated Bryan Danielson in a 60-minute iron man match to retain the AEW World Championship	
5	Dragongate	Champion Gate 2023; Night 2	Osaka, Japan	Shun Skywalker (c) defeated Strong Machine J to retain the Open the Dream Gate Championship	
5	GCW	Ransom	Atlantic City, New Jersey	Allie Katch defeated Charles Mason in a Steel Cage match	
6	NJPW	NJPW 51st Anniversary Show	Tokyo, Japan	Bishamon (Hirooki Goto and Yoshi-Hashi) (c) defeated Kazuchika Okada and Hiroshi Tanahashi to retain the IWGP Tag Team Championship	
7	WWE: NXT	Roadblock	Orlando, Florida	Roxanne Perez (c) defeated Meiko Satomura to retain the NXT Women's Championship	Aired as a special episode of NXT.
7	AJPW; Gleat	AJPW x Gleat; Week 1	Tokyo, Japan	Hikaru Sato defeated Soma Watanabe in a UWF Rules match	
9	CF: Noah	Star Navigation; Night 2	Tokyo, Japan	Amakusa (c) defeated Hi69 to retain the GHC Junior Heavyweight Championship	Featured Daisuke Harada's retirement match.
11	RevPro	Raw Deal	Stevenage, England	Robbie X (c) defeated Rich Swann to retain the Undisputed British Cruiserweight Championship	
14	AJPW	Dream Power Series; Week 1	Tokyo, Japan	Naruki Doi (c) defeated Rising Hayato to retain the World Junior Heavyweight Championship	
15	AEW	St. Patrick's Day Slam	Winnipeg, Manitoba, Canada	Daniel Garcia defeated Brody King	Aired on tape delay on March 17 as a special episode of Rampage.
17	CMLL	Homenaje a Dos Leyendas; Night 1	Mexico City, Mexico	Volador Jr. defeated Rocky Romero in a hair vs. hair match	
17	GCW	Eye for an Eye	New York City, New York	Masha Slamovich defeated Nick Gage (c) to win the GCW World Championship	
18	AJPW; Gleat	AJPW x Gleat; Week 2	Tokyo, Japan	Zennichi Shin Jidai (Kento Miyahara, Shuji Ishikawa, Yuma Anzai, and Yuma Aoyagi) defeated Stronghearts (Cima, El Lindaman, and T-Hawk) and Tetsuya Izuchi	
18	CF: TJPW	Futari Wa Princess Max Heart Tournament 2023 Finals	Tokyo, Japan	Mizuki defeated Yuka Sakazaki (c) to win the Princess of Princess Championship	
19	CF: Noah	Great Voyage in Yokohama 2023	Yokohama, Japan	Jake Lee defeated Kaito Kiyomiya (c) to win the GHC Heavyweight Championship	
19	RevPro	Unfinished Business	St. Neots, England	Robbie X (c) defeated Connor Mills to retain the Undisputed British Cruiserweight Championship	
19	AAA	Lucha Libre World Cup	Zapopan, Mexico	Pentagón Jr. defeated Johnny Caballero	Team Mexico won the 2023 men's Lucha Libre World Cup. Team United States won the 2023 women's Lucha Libre World Cup.
19	GCW	Worst Behavior	Toronto, Ontario, Canada	Masha Slamovich (c) defeated Mike Bailey to retain the GCW World Championship	
20	CMLL	Homenaje a Dos Leyendas; Night 2	Puebla, Mexico	Stigma, Templario, and Volador Jr. defeated Ángel de Oro, Dragón Rojo Jr., and Niebla Roja	
21	NJPW	New Japan Cup (Finals)	Niigata, Japan	Sanada defeated David Finlay to win the 2023 New Japan Cup	
21	AJPW	Dream Power Series; Week 2	Tokyo, Japan	Yuji Nagata (c) defeated Shuji Ishikawa to retain the Triple Crown Heavyweight Championship	
21	CF: DDT	Judgement	Tokyo, Japan	Yuji Hino (c) defeated Yukio Naya to retain the KO-D Openweight Championship	
21	CMLL	Martes de Glamour	Guadalajara, Mexico	Stephanie Vaquer and Zeuxis defeated Las Chicas Indomables (La Jarochita and Lluvia) in a tournament final to win the inaugural Occidente Women's Tag Team Championship	
24	Impact	Sacrifice	Windsor, Ontario, Canada	Time Machine (Alex Shelley, Chris Sabin, and Kushida) defeated Frankie Kazarian, Rich Swann, and Steve Maclin	
25	Stardom	New Blood Premium	Yokohama, Japan	Cosmic Angels (Tam Nakano and Waka Tsukiyama) defeated Nanae Takahashi and Kairi	Featured the finals of the New Blood Tag Team Championship inaugural tournament.
26	AJPW	Dream Power Series; Week 3	Tokyo, Japan	Voodoo Murders (Jun Saito, Rei Saito, and Suwama) defeated Zennichi Shin Jidai (Kento Miyahara, Shuji Ishikawa, and Yuma Aoyagi)	
26	RevPro	Revolution Rumble	London, England	Michael Oku won a 30-man Revolution Rumble	
30	EWF	Jake The Snake's Flirting with Venom	San Gabriel, California	Alberto El Patrón defeated Vladimir Moskayev	
30	GCW	Josh Barnett's Bloodsport 9	Los Angeles, California	Timothy Thatcher defeated Josh Barnett	
30	CF: DDT	DDT Goes Hollywood	Los Angeles, California	Konosuke Takeshita defeated Yuki Ueno	
30	Impact; NJPW	Multiverse United	Los Angeles, California	Hiroshi Tanahashi defeated Mike Bailey	
30	Independent	Mark Hitchcock Memorial Supershow	Los Angeles, California	El Hijo del Vikingo (c) defeated Black Taurus and Komander in a three-way match to retain the AAA Mega Championship	The event was promoted by the organizers of the WrestleCon fan convention.
31	ROH	Supercard of Honor	Los Angeles, California	Claudio Castagnoli (c) defeated Eddie Kingston to retain the ROH World Championship	
31	CF: TJPW	Live in Los Angeles	Los Angeles, California	Magical Sugar Rabbits (Mizuki and Yuka Sakazaki) defeated 121000000 (Maki Ito and Miyu Yamashita) (c) to win the Princess Tag Team Championship	
31	GCW; CF: DDT	GCW vs. DDT	Los Angeles, California	Yoshihiko defeats Cole Radrick (c) to win the Ironman Heavymetalweight Championship	
31	GCW	Joey Janela's Spring Break 7	Los Angeles, California	Kota Ibushi defeated Joey Janela	
(c) – denotes defending champion(s)

=== April ===
Date	Promotion(s)	Event	Location	Main Event	Notes
1	CMLL	80th Aniversario De La Arena Coliseo	Mexico City, Mexico	Ángel de Oro, Mistico, and Soberano Jr. defeated Averno, Templario, and Volador Jr.	
1	WWE: NXT	Stand & Deliver	Los Angeles, California	Carmelo Hayes defeated Bron Breakker (c) to win the NXT Championship	Aired midday before WrestleMania 39 Night 1.
1	WWE: Raw; SmackDown	WrestleMania 39	Inglewood, California	Kevin Owens and Sami Zayn defeated The Usos (Jey Uso and Jimmy Uso) (c) to win the Undisputed WWE Tag Team Championship	
2	WWE: Raw; SmackDown	WrestleMania 39	Inglewood, California	Roman Reigns (c) defeated Cody Rhodes to retain the Undisputed WWE Universal Championship	
5	Dragongate	Gate of Passion; Night 3	Tokyo, Japan	Madoka Kikuta defeated Kota Minoura to earn a shot at the Open the Dream Gate Championship	
6	MLW	War Chamber	Queens, New York	The Calling (Rickey Shane Page, Delirious, Akira, and Dr. Cornwallus) defeated Alexander Hammerstone and The Second Gear Crew (Mance Warner, Matthew Justice, and 1 Called Manders) in a War Chamber match	
7	AEW	Battle of the Belts VI	Kingston, Rhode Island	The Lucha Brothers (Penta El Zero Miedo and Rey Fenix) (c) defeated Q. T. Marshall and Powerhouse Hobbs to retain the ROH World Tag Team Championship	
7	NWA	312	Highland Park, Illinois	Tyrus (c) defeated Chris Adonis to retain the NWA Worlds Heavyweight Championship	
8	MLW	Battle Riot V	Philadelphia, Pennsylvania	Alex Kane last eliminated Davey Boy Smith Jr. to win the 40-man Battle Riot match to earn an MLW World Heavyweight Championship match.	Featured the finals of the Opera Cup tournament.
8	NJPW	Sakura Genesis	Tokyo, Japan	Sanada defeated Kazuchika Okada (c) to win the IWGP World Heavyweight Championship	
14	NJPW	Tamashii	Adelaide, Australia	Hirooki Goto defeated Chris Basso	
15	NJPW	Tamashii	Sydney, Australia	Shingo Takagi defeated Jack Bonza	
15	NJPW	Capital Collision	Washington, D.C.	Aussie Open (Mark Davis and Kyle Fletcher) defeated The Motor City Machine Guns (Alex Shelley and Chris Sabin) (c) and Dream Team (Hiroshi Tanahashi and Kazuchika Okada) in a three-way tag team match to win the Strong Openweight Tag Team Championship	
15	Stardom	Cinderella Tournament 2023 Finals	Tokyo, Japan	Donna Del Mondo (Giulia, Maika, Himeka Arita and Thekla) defeated Cosmic Angels (Tam Nakano, Natsupoi, Mina Shirakawa and Saki)	Also featured the finals of the 2023 Cinderella Tournament.
15	NWA	The World is a Vampire: NWA vs. WAOA	Wollongong, Australia	Kerry Morton (c) defeated Bobby Bishop to retain the NWA World Junior Heavyweight Championship	
15	CF: TJPW	Stand Alone '23	Tokyo, Japan	Mizuki (c) defeated Nao Kakuta to retain the Princess of Princess Championship	
15	GCW	I Can't Feel my Face	Sauget, Illinois	The Rejects (Reed Bentley and John Wayne Murdoch) defeated Los Mazicos (Miedo Extremo and Ciclope)	
16	NWA	The World is a Vampire: NWA vs. WAOA	Bribie Island, Australia	Kerry Morton (c) defeated Adam Brooks to retain the NWA World Junior Heavyweight Championship	
16	CF: Noah	Green Journey in Sendai	Sendai, Japan	Jake Lee (c) defeated Katsuhiko Nakajima to retain the GHC Heavyweight Championship	
16	Impact	Rebellion	Toronto, Ontario, Canada	Deonna Purrazzo defeated Jordynne Grace to win the vacant Impact Knockouts World Championship	
16	AAA	Triplemanía XXXI: Monterrey	Monterrey, Mexico	Hijo del Vikingo (c) defeated Komander, Rich Swann, and Swerve Strickland in a four-way match to retain the AAA Mega Championship	
16	GCW	Red Means Green	Evansville, Indiana	The East West Express (Jordan Oliver and Nick Wayne) (c) defeated The Rejects (Reed Bentley and John Wayne Murdoch) to retain the GCW World Tag Team Championship	
16	NJPW	Collision in Philadelphia	Philadelphia, Pennsylvania	Aussie Open (Kyle Fletcher and Mark Davis) (c) defeated Chaos (Lio Rush and Tomohiro Ishii) to retain the Strong Openweight Tag Team Championship	
16	NJPW	Tamashii	Melbourne, Victoria, Australia	Shingo Takagi defeated Robbie Eagles	
18	NWA	The World is a Vampire: NWA vs. WAOA	Sydney, Australia; Hastings, Australia	Kerry Morton (c) defeated Alex Taylor and Mick Moretti in a three-way match to retain the NWA World Junior Heavyweight Championship "Thrillbilly" Silas Mason defeated Caveman Ugg in a No Disqualification match	
19	NWA	The World is a Vampire: NWA vs. WAOA	Newcastle, New South Wales, Australia	Mick Moretti and The VeloCities (Jude London and Paris De Silva) defeated Alex Taylor and La Rebelión (Bestia 666 and Mecha Wolf)	
21	GCW	Into the Light	Atlanta, Georgia	El Hijo del Vikingo defeated Komander	
22	NJPW	Hirooki Goto 20th Anniversary Event	Mie, Japan	Chaos (Hirooki Goto, Yoshi-Hashi and Yoh) defeated House of Torture (Evil, Yujiro Takahashi and Sho)	
22	GCW	Scene of the Crime	Orlando, Florida	Masha Slamovich (c) defeated Sawyer Wreck to retain the GCW World Championship	
23	Progress	Chapter 151: Heavy Metal	London, England	Spike Trivet (c) defeated Cara Noir in a Steel cage match to retain the PROGRESS World Championship	
23	NWA	The World is a Vampire: NWA vs. WAOA	Ballarat, Australia	Kerry Morton (c) defeated Emmen Azman to retain the NWA World Junior Heavyweight Championship	
23	Stardom	All Star Grand Queendom	Yokohama, Japan	Tam Nakano defeated Giulia (c) to win the World of Stardom Championship	
25	WWE: NXT	Spring Breakin'	Orlando, Florida	Indi Hartwell (c) defeated Roxanne Perez and Tiffany Stratton to retain the NXT Women's Championship	Aired as a special episode of NXT.
26	NWA	The World is a Vampire: NWA vs. WAOA	Adelaide, Australia	Kerry Morton defeated Mercurio and Nick Armstrong	
27	NWA	The World is a Vampire: NWA vs. WAOA	Melbourne, Victoria, Australia	La Rebelión (Bestia 666 and Mecha Wolf) (c) defeated Adam Brooks and Emmen Azman to retain the NWA World Tag Team Championship	
28	Progress	Chapter 152: For The Love Of Progress	Manchester, England	Dominatus Regnum (Bullit, Charlie Sterling, Nick Riley and Spike Trivet) defeated SAnitY (Axel Tischer and Big Damo) and Sunshine Machine (Chuck Mambo and TK Cooper)	
28	CMLL	Arena Mexico 67. Aniversario	Mexico City, Mexico	Dragón Rojo Jr. defeated Atlantis Jr. and Templario in a three-way elimination match to win the 2023 Campeon Universal Del CMLL	CMLL Universal Championship Finals
29	CF: Noah	Star Navigation; Night 3	Tokyo, Japan	Good Looking Guys (Tadasuke and Yo-Hey) (c) defeated Los Golpeadores (Dragón Bane and Alpha Wolf) to retain the GHC Junior Heavyweight Tag Team Championship	
29	NJPW	Wrestling Satsuma no Kuni	Kagoshima, Japan	Taichi defeated Shingo Takagi (c) in a Takagi Style Triad match to win the Provisional KOPW 2023 Championship	
29	AJPW; FMW-E	AJPW x FMW-E	Yokohama, Japan	Atsushi Onita and Yoshitatsu (c) defeated Hikaru Sato and Shuji Ishikawa in a Barbed Wire Blast, Blast Bat and Barbed Wire Barricade Mine Death match to retain the All Asia Tag Team Championship	
29	NWA	The World is a Vampire: NWA vs. WAOA	Newcastle, Australia	Slex defeated Silas Mason	
30	NWA	The World is a Vampire: NWA vs. WAOA	Gold Coast, Australia	Silas Mason defeated Slex	
30	CMLL	Que No Te Ganen Tus Monstruos	Guadalajara, Jalisco, Mexico	Los Magnificos (Adrenalina, Explosivo and Fantastico) defeated La Mafia (Leo, Omar Brunetti and Vaquero Jr.)	
30	CMLL	Día del Niño	Mexico City, Mexico	Volcano defeated Raider, Akuma, Capitan Suicida, El Satanico and Volador Jr. to win the Torneo Embajador De Los Ninos Cibernetico	
(c) – denotes defending champion(s)

=== May ===
Date	Promotion(s)	Event	Location	Main Event	Notes
3	CF: DDT	Mega Max Bump 2023	Yokohama, Japan	Yuji Hino (c) defeated Yuki "not Sexy" Iino to retain the KO-D Openweight Championship	
3	NJPW	Wrestling Dontaku	Fukuoka, Japan	Sanada (c) defeated Hiromu Takahashi to retain the IWGP World Heavyweight Championship	
4	Stardom	Fukuoka Goddess Legend	Fukuoka, Japan	Mina Shirakawa (c) defeated Natsupoi to retain the Wonder of Stardom Championship	
4	CF: Noah	Majestic 2023	Tokyo, Japan	Jake Lee (c) defeated Naomichi Marufuji to retain the GHC Heavyweight Championship	
5	Dragongate	Dead or Alive 2023	Nagoya, Japan	Madoka Kikuta defeated Shun Skywalker (c) to win the Open the Dream Gate Championship	
5	CF: TJPW	Yes! Wonderland 2023	Tokyo, Japan	Mizuki (c) defeated Sawyer Wreck to retain the Princess of Princess Championship	
6	WWE: Raw; SmackDown	Backlash	San Juan, Puerto Rico	Cody Rhodes defeated Brock Lesnar	First major WWE event in Puerto Rico since 2005.
7	AJPW	Champion Carnival Final	Tokyo, Japan	Shotaro Ashino defeated T-Hawk to win the Champion Carnival 2023	
12	Stardom	New Blood 8	Tokyo, Japan	Tam Nakano defeated Tam Nakano (Nao Ishikawa)	
13	AJPW	Super Power Series; Night 1	Toyama, Japan	Zennichi Shin Jidai (Kento Miyahara and Shuji Ishikawa) and Yuji Nagata defeated Satoshi Kojima, Suwama and Takao Omori	
14	AJPW	Super Power Series; Night 2	Matsumoto, Japan	Yuma Aoyagi defeated Atsuki Aoyagi	
18	AJPW	Super Power Series; Night 3	Tokyo, Japan	T-Hawk defeated Ryuki Honda to become a number one contender for the Triple Crown Heavyweight Championship	
19	CMLL	Copa Jr. VIP; Week 1	Mexico City, Mexico	Dragón Rojo Jr. and Soberano Jr. defeated El Hijo del Villano III, Atlantis Jr., Averno, Místico, Panterita del Ring Jr. and Volador Jr. in a Copa Jr. VIP 2023 semifinal match.	
20	AJPW	Supermarket Pro Wrestling	Japan	Aoyagi Brothers (Yuma Aoyagi and Atsuki Aoyagi) and Yuma Anzai defeated Kento Miyahara, Shuji Ishikawa and Ryo Inoue	
20	GCW	The Way I Am	Detroit, Michigan	Masha Slamovich (c) defeated Jimmy Lloyd to retain the GCW World Championship	
21	NJPW	Resurgence	Long Beach, California	Willow Nightingale defeated Mercedes Moné in a tournament final for the inaugural Strong Women's Championship	
21	CF: DDT	King of DDT Tournament 2023 (Finals)	Tokyo, Japan	Chris Brookes defeated Kazusada Higuchi in the finals of the 2023 King of DDT Tournament	
21	GCW	I Can't Save You	Columbus, Ohio	Masha Slamovich (c) defeated Mance Warner to retain the GCW World Championship	
23	Independent	Hana Kimura Memorial Show 3	Tokyo, Japan	Aja Kong and Sareee defeated Mika Iwata and Mio Momono	The event was promoted by Kyoko Kimura.
26	CMLL	Copa Jr. VIP; Week 2	Mexico City, Mexico	Soberano Jr. defeated Dragón Rojo Jr. to win the 2023 Copa Jr. VIP.	
26	Impact	Under Siege	London, Ontario, Canada	Steve Maclin (c) defeated PCO in a no disqualification match to retain the Impact World Championship	
26	GCW	Lifestyle	Las Vegas, Nevada	Masha Slamovich (c) defeated Cole Radrick to retain the GCW Ultraviolent Championship	
27	Stardom	Flashing Champions	Tokyo, Japan	Tam Nakano (World) defeated Mina Shirakawa (Wonder) for the World of Stardom Championship and Wonder of Stardom Championship	
27	WWE: Raw; SmackDown	Night of Champions	Jeddah, Saudi Arabia	Kevin Owens and Sami Zayn (c) defeated The Bloodline (Roman Reigns and Solo Sikoa) to retain the Undisputed WWE Tag Team Championship	First Night of Champions event since 2015.
28	NJPW	Best of the Super Juniors (Finals)	Tokyo, Japan	Master Wato defeated Titán to win the 2023 Best of the Super Juniors	
28	AEW	Double or Nothing	Paradise, Nevada	Blackpool Combat Club (Bryan Danielson, Jon Moxley, Claudio Castagnoli, and Wheeler Yuta) defeated The Elite (Kenny Omega, Matt Jackson, Nick Jackson, and "Hangman" Adam Page) in an Anarchy in the Arena match	
28	WWE: NXT	Battleground	Lowell, Massachusetts	Carmelo Hayes (c) defeated Bron Breakker to retain the NXT Championship	First Battleground event since 2017.
29	AJPW	Super Power Series; Night 4	Tokyo, Japan	Yuji Nagata (c) defeated T-Hawk to retain the Triple Crown Heavyweight Championship	
(c) – denotes defending champion(s)

=== June ===
Date	Promotion(s)	Event	Location	Main Event	Notes
2	Stardom	New Blood 9	Tokyo, Japan	Rina (c) defeated Lady C to retain the Future of Stardom Championship	
3	AJPW	51st Anniversary	Tokyo, Japan	Kento Miyahara and Yuma Aoyagi vs. Suwama and Yuma Anzai ended in a time limit draw	
3	NWA	Crockett Cup	Winston-Salem, North Carolina	La Rebelión (Bestia 666 and Mecha Wolf) defeated Flippin' Psychos (Flip Gordon and Fodder) in a Crockett Cup second round match	
4	NWA	Crockett Cup	Winston-Salem, North Carolina	Knox and Murdoch defeated Blunt Force Trauma (Carnage and Damage) to win the 2023 Crockett Cup tournament	
4	NJPW	Dominion 6.4 in Osaka-jo Hall	Osaka, Japan	Sanada (c) defeated Yota Tsuji to retain the IWGP World Heavyweight Championship	
4	CMLL	Copa Dinastías; Week 1	Mexico City, Mexico	Hijo De Stuka Jr. and Stuka Jr. defeated Euforia and Soberano Jr. in a 2023 Copa Dinastia semifinal match	
4	GCW	Cage of Survival 2	Atlantic City, New Jersey	Blake Christian defeated Masha Slamovich (c) and Rina Yamashita in a Cage of Survival match to win the GCW World Championship	
9	AJPW; NJPW; Noah	All Together Again	Tokyo, Japan	Kazuchika Okada, Yuma Aoyagi and Kenoh defeated Hiroshi Tanahashi, Kento Miyahara and Kaito Kiyomiya	
9	Impact	Against All Odds	Columbus, Ohio	Alex Shelley defeated Steve Maclin (c) to win the Impact World Championship	
10	NJPW	NJPW Academy Showcase	Carson, California	Johnnie Robbie defeated Trish Adora	
11	AJPW	Dynamite Series; Night 1	Kōriyama, Japan	Zennichi Shin Jidai (Kento Miyahara and Yuma Anzai) defeated Yuji Nagata and Yutaka Yoshie	
11	CMLL	Copa Dinastías; Week 2	Mexico City, Mexico	Dr. Karonte I and Místico defeated Atlantis and Atlantis Jr. in a 2023 Copa Dinastia semifinal match	
14	AJPW	Fortune Dream 8	Tokyo, Japan	Ayato Yoshida, Hayato Tamura and Tetsuya Endo vs. T-Hawk, Takuya Nomura and Yuma Aoyagi ended in a time limit draw	
15	AJPW	Dynamite Series; Night 2	Tokyo, Japan	Zennichi Shin Jidai (Kento Miyahara and Yuma Aoyagi) defeated Kongo (Kenoh and Manabu Soya) (c) to win the World Tag Team Championship	
17	CF: Noah	Great Journey in Nagoya 2023	Nagoya, Japan	Jake Lee (c) defeated Takashi Sugiura to retain the GHC Heavyweight Championship	
17	AJPW	Dynamite Series; Night 3	Tokyo, Japan	Yuji Nagata (c) defeated Yuma Anzai to retain the Triple Crown Heavyweight Championship	
17	RevPro	Cruel Intentions	Stevenage, England	Trent Seven defeated Michael Oku	
17	GCW	Thank Me Later	Los Angeles, California	Zack Sabre Jr. defeated Nick Gage	
18	NJPW; AJPW	Blue Justice XII	Chiba, Japan	Hiroshi Tanahashi, Master Wato, Satoshi Kojima and Yuji Nagata defeated Zennichi Shin Jidai (Atsuki Aoyagi, Kento Miyahara, Yuma Anzai and Yuma Aoyagi)	
18	CMLL	Copa Dinastías Final; Week 3	Mexico City, Mexico	Dr. Karonte I and Místico defeated Hijo De Stuka Jr. and Stuka Jr. to win the 2023 Copa Dinastia	
20	WWE: NXT	Gold Rush; Night 1	Orlando, Florida	Seth "Freakin" Rollins (c) defeated Bron Breakker to retain the World Heavyweight Championship	Aired as a special episode of NXT.
23	AJPW	Yoshida Factory	Minami-ku, Kumamoto, Japan	Zennichi Shin Jidai (Atsuki Aoyagi, Kento Miyahara and Yuma Aoyagi) defeated Takao Omori, Tomoaki Honma and Yoshi Tatsu	
23	GCW	Ride or Die	Chicago, Illinois	Blake Christian (c) defeated Gringo Loco to retain the GCW World Championship	
24	CF: Noah	Kenoh's 15th Anniversary	Tokushima, Japan	Kongo (Kenoh, Masakatsu Funaki, Manabu Soya, Shuji Kondo and Hajime Ohara) defeated Naomichi Marufuji, Sugiura-gun (Takashi Sugiura and Kazushi Sakuraba), Amakusa and Alejandro	
24	AJPW	Komeri Power Wrestling	Nagoya, Japan	Zennichi Shin Jidai (Atsuki Aoyagi, Kento Miyahara and Yuma Aoyagi) defeated Black Mensore, Takao Omori and Yoshi Tatsu	
24	GCW	Mastermind	Hartford, Connecticut	Joey Janela defeated Tank in a Texas Death match	
25	Stardom	Sunshine 2023	Tokyo, Japan	Queen's Quest (Utami Hayashishita, Saya Kamitani, AZM, Lady C, Miyu Amasaki and Hina) defeated Oedo Tai (Natsuko Tora, Saki Kashima, Momo Watanabe, Starlight Kid, Ruaka and Rina) in a Loser Leaves Stable Cage match	
25	RevPro	No Escape	St. Neots, England	Robbie X defeated Shigehiro Irie	
25	DEFY; Progress	DEFY x Progress Toronto	Toronto, Canada	The Bollywood Boyz (Gurv Sihra and Harv Sihra) (c) defeated Matt Cross and Psycho Mike to retain the DEFY Tag Team Championship	
25	AEW; NJPW	Forbidden Door	Toronto, Ontario, Canada	Bryan Danielson defeated Kazuchika Okada	First AEW PPV outside of the United States, first NJPW PPV held in Canada, and first non-WWE PPV in Toronto since 1999.
26	AJPW	Dynamite Series; Night 4	Tokyo, Japan	Master Wato, Ryuki Honda and Yuji Nagata defeated Zennichi Shin Jidai (Atsuki Aoyagi and Yuma Aoyagi) and Yoshi Tatsu	
27	WWE: NXT	Gold Rush; Night 2	Orlando, Florida	Carmelo Hayes (c) defeated Baron Corbin to retain the NXT Championship	Aired as a special episode of NXT.
26	CMLL	50th Aniversario Del El Satánico	Puebla, Mexico	Los Infernales (Averno, El Satánico and Mephisto) defeated Atlantis, El Desperado and Tiger Mask IV	
27	CMLL	50th Aniversario Del El Satánico	Guadalajara, Mexico	Los Ingobernables de Japon (Bushi, Tetsuya Naito and Titán) defeated Averno, Rey Bucanero and Último Guerrero	
30	CMLL; NJPW	Fantastica Mania Mexico	Mexico City, Mexico	Rocky Romero (c) defeated Volador Jr. to retain the NWA World Historic Welterweight Championship	First NJPW PPV In Mexico.
30	Impact	Down Under Tour; Day 1	Wagga Wagga, Australia	Alex Shelley (c) defeated Steve Maclin to retain the Impact World Championship	
(c) – denotes defending champion(s)

=== July ===
Date	Promotion(s)	Event	Location	Main Event	Notes
1	WWE: Raw; SmackDown	Money in the Bank	London, England	The Usos (Jey Uso and Jimmy Uso) defeated The Bloodline (Roman Reigns and Solo Sikoa) in a "Bloodline Civil War"	First major WWE event in London in over two decades.
1	Impact	Down Under Tour; Day 2	Wagga Wagga, Australia	Deonna Purrazzo (c) defeated Gisele Shaw to retain the Impact Knockouts World Championship	
2	Stardom	Mid Summer Champions 2023	Yokohama, Japan	Saori Anou defeated Natsupoi in a Strap match	
2	Dragongate	Kobe Pro-Wrestling Festival 2023	Kobe, Japan	Diamante lost his mask in a five-way Cage match against Dragon Kid, Shun Skywalker, Strong Machine J and Ultimo Dragon	
2	AJPW	Dynamite Series; Night 5	Tokyo, Japan	Yuma Aoyagi defeated Yuji Nagata (c) to win the Triple Crown Heavyweight Championship	
4	NJPW	Independence Day	Tokyo, Japan	Jun Kasai and El Desperado defeated Homicide and Jon Moxley in a No Disqualification doomsday match	First NJPW Strong events in Japan.
5	NJPW	Independence Day	Tokyo, Japan	Jon Moxley defeated El Desperado in a Final Death match	First NJPW Strong events in Japan.
8	MLW	Never Say Never	Philadelphia, Pennsylvania	Alex Kane defeated Alexander Hammerstone (c) to win the MLW World Heavyweight Championship	
8	NWA	HP Cares for Cooper	Highland Park, Illinois	Kamille (c) defeated Natalia Markova to retain the NWA World Women's Championship	All proceeds were donated to the family of Cooper Roberts, who was shot and wounded during the Highland Park parade shooting and had been in intensive care ever since.
8	GCW	Clean Up Man	Hartford, Connecticut	Nick Gage defeated Psycho Clown	
8	CF: TJPW	Summer Sun Princess '23	Tokyo, Japan	Mizuki (c) defeated Maki Ito to retain the Princess of Princess Championship	
7	All Elite Wrestling	Rampage 100	Edmonton, Alberta, Canada	Big Bill and Brian Cage defeated Matt Sydal and Trent Beretta to advance in the Blind Eliminator Tag Team Tournament	
9	RevPro	Epic Encounter	London, England	Michael Oku (c) defeated Great-O-Khan to retain the Undisputed British Heavyweight Championship	
15	AEW	Battle of the Belts VII	Calgary, Alberta, Canada	Luchasaurus (c) defeated Shawn Spears to retain the AEW TNT Championship	
15	AAA	Triplemanía XXXI: Tijuana	Tijuana, Mexico	Hijo del Vikingo (c) defeated Kenny Omega to retain the AAA Mega Championship	
15	Impact	Slammiversary	Windsor, Ontario, Canada	Alex Shelley (c) defeated Nick Aldis to retain the Impact World Championship	
15	CF: Noah	One Night Dream	Tokyo, Japan	Katsuhiko Nakajima defeated Kento Miyahara	
18	GCW	The New Face of War	Tokyo, Japan	Masashi Takeda defeated Joey Janela	
19	AEW	Blood & Guts	Boston, Massachusetts	The Golden Elite (Kenny Omega, "Hangman" Adam Page, Matt Jackson, Nick Jackson, and Kota Ibushi) defeated Blackpool Combat Club (Jon Moxley, Claudio Castagnoli, and Wheeler Yuta), Konosuke Takeshita, and Pac in a Blood and Guts match	Aired as a special episode of Dynamite.
19	AEW	Royal Rampage	Boston, Massachusetts	Kris Statlander (c) defeated Marina Shafir to retain the AEW TBS Championship	Aired on tape delay on July 21 as a special episode of Rampage.
19	GCW	Planet Death	Tokyo, Japan	Jun Kasai defeated John Wayne Murdoch in a Texas Death match	
21	ROH	Death Before Dishonor	Trenton, New Jersey	Athena (c) defeated Willow Nightingale to retain the ROH Women's World Championship	
21	AAA	Verano de Escándalo	Aguascalientes, Mexico	Sam Adonis, Cibernético and Gringo Loco defeated El Hijo del Vikingo, Alberto El Patrón and Psycho Clown	
23	CF: DDT	Wrestle Peter Pan 2023	Tokyo, Japan	Chris Brookes defeated Yuji Hino (c) to win the KO-D Openweight Championship	
30	WWE: NXT	The Great American Bash	Cedar Park, Texas	Carmelo Hayes (c) defeated Ilja Dragunov to retain the NXT Championship	
(c) – denotes defending champion(s)

=== August ===
Date	Promotion(s)	Event	Location	Main Event	Notes
2	AEW	Dynamite: 200	Tampa, Florida	Hikaru Shida defeated Toni Storm (c) to win the AEW Women's World Championship	Celebrated the 200th episode of Dynamite.
3	Dragongate	King of Gate 2023 (Finals)	Tokyo, Japan	Kota Minoura defeated Big Boss Shimizu to win the 2023 King of Gate tournament	
4	GCW	My Name Is	Detroit, Michigan	Blake Christian (c) defeated Mike Bailey to retain the GCW World Championship	
5	WWE: Raw; SmackDown	SummerSlam	Detroit, Michigan	Roman Reigns (c) defeated Jey Uso in a Tribal Combat to retain the Undisputed WWE Universal Championship and recognition of Tribal Chief of the Anoaʻi family	
11	GCW	No Signal in the Hills 3	Los Angeles, California	Johnny Game Changer defeated Nick Gage	
12	AAA	Triplemanía XXXI: Mexico City	Mexico City, Mexico	Sam Adonis loses his hair in a Four-way Lucha de Apuestas Hair vs. Mask match against Psycho Clown (mask), Rush El Toro Blanco (hair) and L.A. Park (mask)	
13	Stardom	Stardom x Stardom: Osaka Summer Team	Osaka, Japan	Tam Nakano (c) defeated Megan Bayne to retain the World of Stardom Championship	
13	NJPW	G1 Climax 33 (Finals)	Tokyo, Japan	Tetsuya Naito defeated Kazuchika Okada to win the G1 Climax tournament	The winner received an IWGP World Heavyweight Championship match at Wrestle Kingdom 18.
13	CF: TJPW	Tokyo Princess Cup 2023 (Finals)	Tokyo, Japan	Miyu Yamashita defeated Yuki Kamifuku to win the Tokyo Princess Cup	
13	PWG	PWG Twenty: Mystery Vortex	Los Angeles, California	Daniel Garcia (c) defeated Mike Bailey (4:3) in an Iron Man match to retain the PWG World Championship	
16	AEW	Fight for the Fallen; Night 1	Nashville, Tennessee	The Young Bucks (Matt Jackson and Nick Jackson) defeated The Gunns (Austin Gunn and Colten Gunn)	Aired as a special episode of Dynamite.
16	AEW	Fight for the Fallen; Night 2	Nashville, Tennessee	Hikaru Shida and Skye Blue defeated The Outcasts (Ruby Soho and Toni Storm)	Aired on tape delay on August 18 as a special episode of Rampage.
17	NWA	The World is a Vampire Tour	Huntsville, Alabama	EC3 defeated Kerry Morton by disqualification	
18	Stardom	Stardom New Blood 10	Tokyo, Japan	Rina (c) defeated Waka Tsukiyama to retain the Future of Stardom Championship	
19	Stardom	Stardom Midsummer Festival	Tokyo, Japan	Jaguar Yokota and NanaMomo (Momoe Nakanishi and Nanae Takahashi) defeated Black Desire (Momo Watanabe and Starlight Kid) and Yuu	
19	AEW	Fight for the Fallen; Night 3	Lexington, Kentucky	Darby Allin defeated Christian Cage	Aired as a special episode of Collision.
19	AEW	Fyter Fest; Night 2	Lexington, Kentucky	The Outcasts (Saraya and Toni Storm) defeated Hikaru Shida and Dr. Britt Baker, D.M.D.	Aired on tape delay on August 25 as a special episode of Rampage.
19	NJPW	All Star Junior Festival USA	Philadelphia, Pennsylvania	Mike Bailey defeated Kevin Knight in the finals of the All Star Jr. Festival USA tournament	
19	NWA	The World is a Vampire Tour	West Palm Beach, Florida	The Southern 6 (Alex Taylor, Kerry Morton and "Thrillbilly" Silas Mason) defeated Colby Corino and The Country Gentlemen (AJ Cazana and Anthony Andrews)	
20	NWA	The World is a Vampire Tour	Tampa, Florida	The Southern 6 (Alex Taylor, Kerry Morton and "Thrillbilly" Silas Mason) defeated Colby Corino and The Country Gentlemen (AJ Cazana and Anthony Andrews)	
20	NJPW; Impact	Multiverse United 2	Philadelphia, Pennsylvania	Alex Shelley (c) defeated Hiroshi Tanahashi to retain the Impact World Championship	
20	Dragongate	Dangerous Gate 2023	Ōta City, Japan	Madoka Kikuta (c) defeated Kota Minoura to retain the Open the Dream Gate Championship	
22	NWA	The World is a Vampire Tour	Charlotte, North Carolina	Colby Corino and The Country Gentlemen (AJ Cazana and Anthony Andrews) defeated The Southern 6 (Alex Taylor, Kerry Morton and "Thrillbilly" Silas Mason)	
22	WWE: NXT	Heatwave	Orlando, Florida	Carmelo Hayes (c) defeated Wes Lee to retain the NXT Championship	Aired as a special episode of NXT.
23	AEW	Fyter Fest; Night 1	Duluth, Georgia	Aussie Open (Kyle Fletcher and Mark Davis) (c) defeated The Hardys (Jeff Hardy and Matt Hardy) to retain the ROH World Tag Team Championship	Aired as a special episode of Dynamite.
23	AEW	Fyter Fest; Night 3	Duluth, Georgia	Darby Allin, Sting, Hook, and CM Punk defeated Mogul Embassy (Brian Cage and Swerve Strickland), Jay White, and Luchasaurus	Aired on tape delay on August 26 as a special episode of Collision.
26	Progress	Chapter 154: It's Clobberin' Time	London, England	Mark Haskins (with Vicky Haskins) defeated Leon Slater	
26	RevPro	11th Anniversary Show	London, England	Will Ospreay defeated Shingo Takagi	
26	NWA	75th Anniversary Show	St. Louis, Missouri	Kamille (c) defeated Natalia Markova in a No Limits match to retain the NWA World Women's Championship	
27	NWA	75th Anniversary Show	St. Louis, Missouri	EC3 defeated Tyrus (c) in a Bullrope match to win the NWA Worlds Heavyweight Championship	
27	AEW	All In	London, England	MJF (c) defeated Adam Cole to retain the AEW World Championship	First All In event since 2018, first AEW event in the UK, first AEW PPV outside North America, and first AEW event to be held in an association football stadium. Also the first professional wrestling event to be held at present day Wembley Stadium.
27	Impact	Emergence	Toronto, Ontario, Canada	Trinity (c) defeated Deonna Purrazzo to retain the Impact Knockouts World Championship	
(c) – denotes defending champion(s)

=== September ===
Date	Promotion(s)	Event	Location	Main Event	Notes
1	GCW	Say You Will	Hoffman Estates, Illinois	El Hijo del Vikingo defeated Nick Gage	
2	WWE: Raw; SmackDown	Payback	Pittsburgh, Pennsylvania	Seth "Freakin" Rollins (c) defeated Shinsuke Nakamura to retain the World Heavyweight Championship	First Payback event since 2020. Last WWE major event before UFC–WWE merger was finalized.
3	Stardom	5Star Special in Hiroshima	Hiroshima, Japan	Giulia (c) defeated Risa Sera to retain the Strong Women's Championship	
3	CF: Noah	N-1 Victory (Finals)	Osaka, Japan	Go Shiozaki defeated Kenoh in the N-1 Victory finals	
3	AEW	All Out	Chicago, Illinois	Jon Moxley defeated Orange Cassidy (c) to win the AEW International Championship	
3	MLW	Fury Road	Philadelphia, Pennsylvania	Alex Kane (c) defeated Willie Mack to retain the MLW World Heavyweight Championship	
8	Impact	Victory Road	White Plains, New York	Josh Alexander defeated Steve Maclin	
8	WWE: Raw	Superstar Spectacle	Gachibowli, Hyderabad, India	John Cena and Seth "Freakin" Rollins defeated Imperium (Giovanni Vinci and Ludwig Kaiser)	First Superstar Spectacle event since 2021, first major WWE Live event in India since 2017, and first live event in Hyderabad.
9	Progress	Chapter 155: Feel The Noize	Birmingham, England	Ricky Knight Jr. (c) defeated Yoshiki Inamura to retain the Progress Atlas Championship	
9	Impact	Impact 1000	White Plains, New York	Night 1: Chris Sabin defeated Lio Rush (c) to win the Impact X Division Championship; Night 2: Team Over (Gail Kim, Jordynne Grace, Mickie James, Trinity and Awesome Kong) defeated Team Beautiful People (Gisele Shaw, Angelina Love, Deonna Purrazzo, Savannah Evans and Tasha Steelz)	Impact's 1000th episode, featured Team 3D in Impact! for the first time in 7 years. Aired on tape delay on September 14 and 21.
10	Stardom	Stardom Dream Tag Festival	Yokohama, Japan	AZM and Starlight Kid defeated Mayu Iwatani and Saki Kashima	
10	Progress	Chapter 156: Steal Yourself	Sheffield, England	Dan Moloney, Kid Lykos and Luke Jacobs defeated Dominatus Regnum (Charlie Sterling, Nick Riley and Spike Trivet)	
10	GCW	Crushed Up	New York City, New York	Rina Yamashita defeated Mike Bailey	
15	NJPW	Tamashii	Sydney, Australia	Ichiban Sweet Boys (Robbie Eagles and Kosei Fujita) defeated The Natural Classics (Tome Filip and Stevie Filip)	
16	CMLL	90th Anniversary Show	Mexico City, Mexico	Templario defeated Dragon Rojo Jr. in a Lucha de Apuestas Mask vs. Mask match	
20	AEW	Grand Slam; Night 1	Queens, New York	MJF (c) defeated Samoa Joe to retain the AEW World Championship	Aired as a special episode of Dynamite.
20	AEW	Grand Slam; Night 2	Queens, New York	The Elite (Matt Jackson, Nick Jackson, and "Hangman" Adam Page) defeated Mogul Embassy (Brian Cage, Bishop Kaun, and Toa Liona) (c) to win the ROH World Six-Man Tag Team Championship	Aired on tape delay on September 22 as a special episode of Rampage.
22	GCW	Long. Live. GCW	Oberhausen, Germany	Nick Gage defeated Joey Janela	
23	RevPro; CMLL	Fantastica Mania UK (Show 1)	Manchester, England	Último Guerrero, Trent Seven and Hechicero defeated Michael Oku, Guerrero Maya Jr. and Atlantis Jr.	
23	RevPro; CMLL	Fantastica Mania UK (Show 2)	Manchester, England	Michael Oku (c) defeated Hechicero to retain the Undisputed British Heavyweight Championship	
23	GCW	GCW vs. The World	Oberhausen, Germany	Joey Janela defeated Shigehiro Irie	
24	CF: Noah	Grand Ship In Nagoya 2023	Nagoya, Japan	Jake Lee (c) defeated Go Shiozaki to retain the GHC Heavyweight Championship	
24	NJPW	Destruction in Kobe	Kobe, Japan	Will Ospreay (c) defeated Yota Tsuji to retain the IWGP United Kingdom Heavyweight Championship	
24	Progress	Chapter 157: Hungry Like The Wolf	London, England	Spike Trivet (c) defeated Kid Lykos to retain the PROGRESS World Championship	
28	Stardom	New Blood 11	Tokyo, Japan	wing★gori (Saya Iida and Hanan) defeated Bloody Fate (c) and 02line (AZM and Miyu Amasaki) to win the New Blood Tag Team Championship	
30	Stardom	5 Star Grand Prix 2023 (Finals)	Yokohama, Japan	Suzu Suzuki defeated Maika to win the 5 Star Grand Prix 2023	
30	WWE: NXT	No Mercy	Bakersfield, California	Becky Lynch (c) defeated Tiffany Stratton in an Extreme Rules match to retain the NXT Women's Championship	First No Mercy event since 2017.
(c) – denotes defending champion(s)

=== October ===
Date	Promotion(s)	Event	Location	Main Event	Notes
1	AAA	Héroes Inmortales	Zapopan, Jalisco	Team USA (QT Marshall and Sam Adonis) defeated Team Mexico (Octagón and Alberto El Patrón)	
1	AEW	WrestleDream	Seattle, Washington	Christian Cage (c) defeated Darby Allin in a two out of three falls match to retain the AEW TNT Championship	This event was dedicated to Antonio Inoki, who died on October 1, 2022.
7	WWE: Raw; SmackDown	Fastlane	Indianapolis, Indiana	Seth "Freakin" Rollins (c) defeated Shinsuke Nakamura in a Last Man Standing match to retain the World Heavyweight Championship	First Fastlane event since 2021.
7	NJPW	NJPW Academy Showcase	Carson, California	Rocky Romero defeated Matt Vandagriff	
9	Stardom	Nagoya Golden Fight	Nagoya, Japan	Tam Nakano (c) defeated Natsuko Tora to retain the World of Stardom Championship	
9	NJPW	Destruction in Ryogoku	Tokyo, Japan	Sanada (c) defeated Evil in a Lumberjack match to retain the IWGP World Heavyweight Championship	
9	CF: TJPW	Wrestle Princess IV	Tokyo, Japan	Miyu Yamashita defeated Mizuki (c) to win the Princess of Princess Championship	
10	GCW	To Live and Die in Tokyo	Tokyo, Japan	John Wayne Murdoch defeated Violento Jack in a Texas Death match	
10	AEW	Title Tuesday	Independence, Missouri	Adam Copeland defeated Luchasaurus	
12	GCW	The Wrld on GCW	Tokyo, Japan	Rina Yamashita (c) defeated Masha Slamovich to retain the GCW Ultraviolent Championship	
14	GCW	Blood on the Hills 2	Los Angeles, California	Gringo Loco and Arez defeated Aramis and Rey Horus	
14	MLW	Slaughterhouse	Philadelphia, Pennsylvania	Alex Kane (c) defeated Tom Lawlor to retain the MLW World Heavyweight Championship	
14	NJPW	Royal Quest III	London, England	Will Ospreay (c) defeated Zack Sabre Jr. to retain the IWGP United Kingdom Heavyweight Championship	
21	AEW	Battle of the Belts VIII	Memphis, Tennessee	Billy Gunn and The Acclaimed (Max Caster and Anthony Bowens) (c) defeated Daniel Garcia, Matt Menard, and Angelo Parker to retain the AEW World Trios Championship	
21	Impact	Bound for Glory	Cicero, Illinois	Alex Shelley (c) defeated Josh Alexander to retain the Impact World Championship	
22	Progress	Chapter 158: The Long Halloween	London, England	Lykos Gym (Kid Lykos and Kid Lykos II) defeated Smokin' Aces (Charlie Sterling and Nick Riley)	
24	WWE: NXT	Halloween Havoc; Night 1	Orlando, Florida	Lyra Valkyria defeated Becky Lynch (c) to win the NXT Women's Championship	Aired as a special episode of NXT.
26	Impact	UK Invasion Tour	Glasgow, Scotland	The Motor City Machine Guns (Alex Shelley and Chris Sabin) defeated Eric Young and Josh Alexander	
27	Impact	Turning Point	Newcastle upon Tyne, England	Will Ospreay defeated Eddie Edwards	Aired on tape delay on November 3.
28	Impact	UK Invasion Tour	Coventry, England	Eric Young and Josh Alexander defeated Frankie Kazarian and Chris Sabin and Subculture (Flash Morgan Webster and Mark Andrews)	
28	NJPW	Fighting Spirit Unleashed	Las Vegas, Nevada	Shingo Takagi defeated Tama Tonga (c) to win the NEVER Openweight Championship	
28	Noah	Demolition Stage In Fukuoka	Fukuoka, Japan	Kenoh defeated Jake Lee (c) to win the GHC Heavyweight Championship	
28	NWA	Samhain	Cleveland, Ohio	EC3 (c) defeated Thom Latimer in a No Limits match to retain the NWA Worlds Heavyweight Championship	
29	Impact	UK Invasion Tour	Coventry, England	Chris Sabin (c) defeated Frankie Kazarian to retain the Impact X Division Championship	
29	Stardom	Halloween Dark Night	Tokyo, Japan	Yuu, Megan Bayne and Maika defeated Mayu Iwatani in a Coffin match	
31	WWE: NXT	Halloween Havoc; Night 2	Orlando, Florida	Ilja Dragunov (c) defeated Carmelo Hayes to retain the NXT Championship	Aired as a special episode of NXT.
31	JCW	Hallowicked	Detroit, Michigan	Joshua Bishop (c) defeated Joey Janela to retain the JCW Heavyweight Championship	
(c) – denotes defending champion(s)

=== November ===
Date	Promotion(s)	Event	Location	Main Event	Notes
3	GCW	Please, Buddy	Sauget, Illinois	Los Macizos (Ciclope and Miedo Extremo) and Jimmy Lloyd defeated The Second Gear Rejects (1 Called Manders, John Wayne Murdoch and Mance Warner)	
4	NJPW	Power Struggle	Osaka, Japan	Will Ospreay (c) defeated Shota Umino to retain the IWGP United Kingdom Heavyweight Championship	
4	GCW	Si or No?	Atlanta, Georgia	Joey Janela defeated Jacob Fatu in a Hardcore match	
4	WWE: Raw; SmackDown	Crown Jewel	Riyadh, Saudi Arabia	Roman Reigns (c) defeated LA Knight to retain the Undisputed WWE Universal Championship	
5	Dragongate	Gate of Destiny 2023	Osaka, Japan	Madoka Kikuta (c) defeated Big Boss Shimizu to retain the Open the Dream Gate Championship	
10	NJPW	Lonestar Shootout	Garland, Texas	Shingo Takagi (c) defeated Trent Beretta to retain the NEVER Openweight Championship	
11	Impact	Throwback Throwdown IV	Mississauga, Ontario, Canada	Tim Burr (Josh Alexander) defeated Boris Alexiev (Santino Marella) in the Fall Maul Tournament Finals	Aired on November 30 as a special episode of Impact!.
12	Stardom	Goddesses of Stardom Tag League (Finals)	Nagaoka, Japan	Divine Kingdom (Maika and Megan Bayne) defeated Crazy Star (Mei Seira and Suzu Suzuki) in the Tag League final match	
12	CF: DDT	Ultimate Party 2023	Tokyo, Japan	Yuki Ueno defeated Chris Brookes (c) to win the KO-D Openweight Championship	
12	Progress	Chapter 159: Wonderbrawl	Manchester, England	Rhio (c) defeated Lana Austin to retain the Progress World Women's Championship	
17	Stardom	New Blood West 1	Osaka, Japan	Rina (c) defeated Hanako to retain the Future of Stardom Championship	
17	GCW	Going and Going	Seattle, Washington	Joey Janela defeated Mike Bailey	
18	Stardom	Gold Rush 2023	Osaka, Japan	Baribari Bombers (Giulia, Thekla and Mai Sakurai) (c) defeated Stars (Hazuki, Hanan and Saya Iida) in a Tables, Ladders, and Chairs Moneyball tournament finals to retain the Artist of Stardom Championship	
18	AEW	Full Gear	Inglewood, California	MJF (c) defeated Jay White to retain the AEW World Championship	
18	MLW	Fightland	Philadelphia, Pennsylvania	Alex Kane (c) defeated Jacob Fatu to retain the MLW World Heavyweight Championship	
18	NWA	Return to Robarts	Sarasota, Florida	EC3 (c) defeated Jax Dane to retain the NWA Worlds Heavyweight Championship	Aired on December 26 as a special episode of Powerrr.
19	AAA	Guerra de Titanes	Ciudad Juárez, Chihuahua	El Hijo del Vikingo (c) defeated Dralístico to retain the AAA Mega Championship	
22	AEW	Thanksgiving Eve Dynamite	Chicago, Illinois	Jon Moxley defeated Mark Briscoe to gain 3 points in the 2023 Continental Classic	
24	GCW	GCW at Wrestlecade	Winston-Salem, North Carolina	Joey Janela defeated Mance Warner in a Hardcore match	
25	WWE: Raw; SmackDown	Survivor Series: WarGames	Rosemont, Illinois	Cody Rhodes, Seth "Freakin" Rollins, Jey Uso, Sami Zayn, and Randy Orton defeated The Judgment Day (Damian Priest, Finn Bálor, "Dirty" Dominik Mysterio, and JD McDonagh) and Drew McIntyre in a WarGames match	Featured the returns of Randy Orton, R-Truth and CM Punk.
26	Progress	Chapter 160: Vendetta	London, England	Spike Trivet (c) defeated Kid Lykos in a No disqualification title vs. mask match to retain the PROGRESS World Championship	
26	AAA; Impact	Ultra Clash	San Pedro Garza García, Nuevo León	The Motor City Machine Guns (Alex Shelley and Chris Sabin) and El Hijo del Vikingo defeated Trey Miguel and Los Vipers (Látigo and Toxin)	Aired on December 7 as a special episode of Impact!.
(c) – denotes defending champion(s)

=== December ===
Date	Promotion(s)	Event	Location	Main Event	Notes
2	Stardom	Nagoya Big Winter	Nagoya, Japan	Suzu Suzuki defeated Hazuki for a World of Stardom Championship shot at Dream Queendom 3	
2	GCW	C'mon Dude	Hartford, Connecticut	Blake Christian (c) defeated Alec Price to retain the GCW World Championship	
3	GCW	What Is Your Choice?	New York City, New York	Matt Cardona defeated Jimmy Lloyd in a Career vs. Broski match	
7	MLW	One Shot	Queens, New York	Alex Kane (c) defeated Matt Cardona to retain the MLW World Heavyweight Championship	First One Shot event since 2017.
7	MLW	Holiday Rush	Queens, New York	The Bomaye Fight Club (Alex Kane and Mr. Thomas) defeated The Second Gear Crew (Matthew Justice and Good Brother#3) (c) by disqualification for the MLW World Tag Team Championship	Aired on tape delay on December 23.
8	WWE: SmackDown	Tribute to the Troops	Providence, Rhode Island	LA Knight and Randy Orton defeated The Bloodline (Jimmy Uso and Solo Sikoa)	Aired as a special episode of SmackDown.
9	Impact	Final Resolution	Mississauga, Ontario, Canada	Josh Alexander and Zack Sabre Jr. defeated The Motor City Machine Guns (Chris Sabin and Alex Shelley)	
9	GCW	Highest in the Room 2	Los Angeles, California	Andrade El Ídolo defeated Joey Janela	
9	WWE: NXT	Deadline	Bridgeport, Connecticut	Ilja Dragunov (c) defeated Baron Corbin to retain the NXT Championship	
13	AEW	Winter Is Coming; Night 1	Arlington, Texas	Jon Moxley defeated Swerve Strickland in a Gold League match of the Continental Classic tournament	Aired as a special episode of Dynamite.
13	AEW	Winter Is Coming; Night 2	Arlington, Texas	Top Flight (Dante Martin and Darius Martin) and Action Andretti defeated Komander, El Hijo del Vikingo, and Penta El Zero Miedo	Aired on tape delay on December 15 as a special episode of Rampage.
15	ROH	Final Battle	Garland, Texas	Athena (c) defeated Billie Starkz to retain the ROH Women's World Championship	
16	AEW	Winter Is Coming; Night 3	Garland, Texas	Bryan Danielson defeated Brody King in a Blue League match of the Continental Classic tournament	Aired as a special episode of Collision.
16	RevPro	RevPro Uprising 2023	London, England	Will Ospreay defeated Gabe Kidd	
20	AEW	Holiday Bash; Night 1	Oklahoma City, Oklahoma	Jay White defeated Jon Moxley in a Gold League match of the Continental Classic tournament	Aired as a special episode of Dynamite.
20	AEW	Holiday Bash; Night 2	Oklahoma City, Oklahoma	El Hijo del Vikingo (c) defeated Black Taurus to retain the AAA Mega Championship	Aired on tape delay on December 22 as a special episode of Rampage.
21	GCW	Holiday Special	Ridgefield Park, New Jersey	Blake Christian (c) defeated Santa Claus (Big Vin) to retain the GCW World Championship	
23	AEW	Holiday Bash; Night 3	San Antonio, Texas	Eddie Kingston defeated Andrade El Ídolo in a Blue League match of the Continental Classic tournament	Aired as a special episode of Collision. Featured Thunder Rosa's first match since August 2022.
25	Stardom	New Blood 12	Tokyo, Japan	wing★gori (Hanan and Saya Iida) (c) defeated Reiwa Tokyo Towers (Ami Sohrei and Lady C) to retain the New Blood Tag Team Championship	
27	AEW	New Year's Smash; Night 1	Orlando, Florida	The Devil's Masked Men (Note: At the time of this match, the identities of both team members were unknown, but they were revealed as Matt Taven and Mike Bennett at Worlds End on December 30.) defeated MJF (c) in a 2-on-1 Handicap match (Note: Samoa Joe was originally scheduled to team with MJF to defend the title in place of an injured Adam Cole, but Joe appeared to have been attacked by The Devil's Masked Men before the match, which was later revealed to have been a ruse as Joe attacked MJF after the match.) to win the ROH World Tag Team Championship	Aired as a special episode of Dynamite.
27	AEW	New Year's Smash; Night 2	Orlando, Florida	Action Andretti and Top Flight (Darius Martin and Dante Martin) defeated Rocky Romero, Trent Beretta, and Orange Cassidy	Aired on tape delay on December 29 as a special episode of Rampage.
29	Stardom	Dream Queendom 2023	Tokyo, Japan	Maika defeated Suzu Suzuki to win the vacant World of Stardom Championship	
30	AEW	Worlds End	Uniondale, New York	Samoa Joe defeated MJF (c) to win the AEW World Championship	Featured the finals of the inaugural Continental Classic tournament, the crowning of AEW's first Triple Crown winner, and the inaugural AEW Continental Champion.
30	Progress	Chapter 161: Unboxing VI And A Movie	London, England	Kid Lykos defeated Eddie Dennis	
31	GCW	Aftermath	Atlantic City, New Jersey	Jun Kasai defeated Nick Gage in a Death match	
(c) – denotes defending champion(s)

== Notable events ==
- January 6 – Vince McMahon returns to WWE as a board member after previously retiring in 2022.
- January 10 – Stephanie McMahon resigns as co-CEO and chairwoman of WWE. Vince McMahon takes the title of executive chairman, while Nick Khan became the sole CEO of the company.
- January 20 – Major League Wrestling signed a new broadcast deal with Reelz.
- January 21 – Negro Casas and his wife Dalys la Caribeña depart from Consejo Mundial de Lucha Libre (CMLL), making their surprise debuts for Lucha Libre AAA Worldwide on the same day. This marked the end of Casas' over 40-year tenure with CMLL.
- April 3 – WWE is sold to Endeavor, the parent company of the mixed martial arts promotion Ultimate Fighting Championship (UFC).
- April 24 & 25 – All Elite Wrestling's YouTube programs, Elevation and Dark, were canceled, respectively.
- June 17 – AEW Collision premiered on TNT.
- August 27 – All Elite Wrestling's pay-per-view, All In, broke the paid attendance record for a professional wrestling event, selling 81,035 tickets, distributing 83,131; however, the show's turnstile count (the number of tickets scanned on the night at the event) was 72,265.
- September 2 – CM Punk's contract with All Elite Wrestling was terminated after a legitimate backstage confrontation with Jack Perry.
- September 12 – WWE's sale to Endeavor is finalized, ending 69 years of family ownership by the McMahon family. WWE and UFC subsequently merged and operate as divisions of a new company called TKO Group Holdings.
- September 15 – Dwayne "The Rock" Johnson makes first WWE appearance in four years.
- October 21 – Impact Wrestling announced it would revert to its former Total Nonstop Action Wrestling (TNA) name, beginning with Hard To Kill on January 13, 2024.
- November 18 – Will Ospreay officially signs with All Elite Wrestling, taking effect in February 2024.
- November 25 – Randy Orton returns to WWE in-ring competition, after an 18-month injury layoff; CM Punk returns to WWE for the first time since January 2014.
- December 23 – Thunder Rosa wrestles her first match since August 10, 2022, after a back injury; Hiroshi Tanahashi is appointed as the president and representative director of New Japan Pro-Wrestling.
- December 26 – CM Punk wrestles his first WWE match since January 20, 2014.

== Accomplishments and tournaments ==
=== 2AW ===
Accomplishment	Winner(s)	Date won	Notes
Active Advance Tournament	Takuro Niki	September 24 (aired October 16)	Defeated Daiju Wakamatsu in the final for a 2AW Openweight Championship match. He would defeat Kohei Sato on October 29 to win the title.

=== AAA ===
Accomplishment	Winner(s)	Date won	Notes
Rey de Reyes	Sam Adonis	February 5	Defeated Bandido, Pagano, and Hijo del Vikingo in the final to win.
Reina de Reinas	Sexy Star II	February 5	Defeated Chik Tormenta, Lady Shani, La Hiedra, and Dalys to win.
Lucha Libre World Cup (Women)	Team USA (Kamille, Deonna Purrazzo, and Jordynne Grace)	March 19	Defeated Team Mexico (Sexy Star II, Flammer, and La Hiedra) in the final to win.
Lucha Libre World Cup (Men)	Team Mexico (Black Taurus, Pentagón Jr., and Laredo Kid)	March 19	Defeated Team USA (Christopher Daniels, Sam Adonis, and Johnny Caballero) in the final to win.
Guerra de Rivalidades	Psycho Clown	August 12	Defeated L. A. Park, Rush El Toro Blanco, and Sam Adonis in the final under Lucha de Apuestas rules. Clown pinned Adonis, meaning Adonis had to shave his head.
Copa Antonio Peña	Chik Tormenta	October 1	Defeated Lady Maravilla in the final to win.

=== AEW ===
Accomplishment	Winner(s)	Date won	Notes
Revolution Tag Team Battle Royale	Jay Lethal and Jeff Jarrett	February 22	Jarrett last eliminated Trent Beretta of Best Friends to enter the AEW World Tag Team Championship match at Revolution, but he and Lethal were unsuccessful in winning the titles.
Casino Tag Team Royale	Orange Cassidy and Danhausen	March 1	Last eliminated The Butcher and The Blade to enter the AEW World Tag Team Championship match at Revolution, but were unsuccessful in winning the titles.
Face of the Revolution ladder match	Powerhouse Hobbs	March 1	Defeated Eddie Kingston, Ortiz, Action Andretti, Sammy Guevara, Komander, Konosuke Takeshita, and A. R. Fox to earn an AEW TNT Championship match. He would defeat Wardlow in a falls count anywhere match on the March 8 episode of Dynamite to win the title.
Four Pillars Tournament	Sammy Guevara	April 26	Defeated Darby Allin in the final to earn an AEW World Championship match at Double or Nothing. He challenged champion MJF for the title in a four-way match also involving Allin and "Jungle Boy" Jack Perry, but was unsuccessful in winning the title.
Tres de Mayo Battle Royale	Billy Gunn and The Acclaimed (Anthony Bowens and Max Caster)	May 3	Gunn and Bowens last eliminated Kip Sabian and The Butcher and The Blade to win.
Blackjack Battle Royal	Orange Cassidy	May 28	Last eliminated Swerve Strickland to retain the AEW International Championship
Owen Hart Cup (Men)	Ricky Starks	July 15	Defeated CM Punk in the final to win the Owen Hart Cup Trophy and Championship.
Owen Hart Cup (Women)	Willow Nightingale	July 15	Defeated Ruby Soho in the final to win the Owen Hart Cup Trophy and Championship.
Blind Eliminator Tag Team Tournament	Adam Cole and MJF	July 19	Defeated The Jericho Appreciation Society (Sammy Guevara and Daniel Garcia) to earn an AEW World Tag Team Championship match. They challenged FTR (Dax Harwood and Cash Wheeler) for the title on the July 29 episode of Collision, but were unsuccessful.
Royal Rampage Battle Royal	Darby Allin	July 19 (aired July 21)	Last eliminated Swerve Strickland to earn an AEW TNT Championship match at All Out. He challenged Luchasaurus for the title at the event but was unsuccessful.
AEW World Tag Team Championship Eliminator Battle Royal	Brian Cage and Big Bill	July 26 (aired July 28)	Last eliminated The Butcher and The Blade to earn an AEW World Tag Team Championship match. They challenged FTR (Dax Harwood and Cash Wheeler) for the title on the August 5 episode of Collision, but were unsuccessful.
AEW Women's World Championship Tournament	Saraya	August 27	Defeated champion Hikaru Shida, Toni Storm, and Dr. Britt Baker, D.M.D. in the final to win the AEW Women's World Championship.
ROH World Tag Team Championship Eliminator Battle Royale	The Dark Order (Alex Reynolds and John Silver)	August 30 (aired September 1)	Silver last eliminated Trent Beretta of Best Friends to earn an ROH World Tag Team Championship match at All Out. He and Reynolds challenged Better Than You Bay Bay (Adam Cole and MJF) for the title at the event but were unsuccessful.
Over Budget Charity Battle Royale	"Hangman" Adam Page	September 3	Last eliminated Brian Cage to donate US$50,000 to the charity of his choosing. Page chose to donate to the Chicago Public Education Fund.
Grand Slam World Championship Eliminator Tournament	Samoa Joe	September 13	Defeated Roderick Strong in the final to earn an AEW World Championship match at Dynamite: Grand Slam. He challenged MJF at the event but was unsuccessful in winning the title.
Dynamite Diamond Battle Royale	Juice Robinson	October 18	12-man battle royal to determine who challenges reigning ring holder MJF in the Dynamite Diamond Final for the AEW Dynamite Diamond Ring. Robinson last eliminated Max Caster to win and faced MJF for the Dynamite Diamond Ring the following week, but was unsuccessful.
AEW TNT Championship #1 Contender's Battle Royale	Killswitch	December 30	Last eliminated Trent Beretta to earn an AEW TNT Championship match at the time and place of his choosing. Later that same night, Killswitch surrendered his contract to his Patriarchy stable leader Christian Cage, who immediately used it to win back the title from Adam Copeland, who he had just lost it to.
Continental Classic	Eddie Kingston	December 30	Defeated Jon Moxley in the final to retain the ROH World Championship and Strong Openweight Championship, as well as to win the inaugural AEW Continental Championship, officially being recognized as the Triple Crown Champion.

=== AJPW ===
Accomplishment	Winner(s)	Date won	Notes
Jr. Tag Battle of Glory	Black Generation International (Kaito Ishida and Kotaro Suzuki)	May 5	Defeated Zennichi Shin Jidai (Atsuki Aoyagi and Rising Hayato) in the final to win.
Champion Carnival	Shotaro Ashino	May 7	Defeated T-Hawk in the final to earn a Triple Crown Heavyweight Championship match. He challenged Katsuhiko Nakajima for the title on the fourth night of the New Year Giant Series tour, but was unsuccessful.
Royal Road Tournament	Satoshi Kojima	August 27	Defeated Ryuki Honda in the final to earn a Triple Crown Heavyweight Championship match. He challenged Yuma Aoyagi for the title on the second night of the Giant Series tour, but was unsuccessful.
Jr. Battle of Glory	Dan Tamura	December 6	Defeated Naruki Doi in the final to earn a World Junior Heavyweight Championship match. He defeated El Lindaman to win the title at Mania X.
Real World Tag League	Katsuhiko Nakajima and Hokuto Omori	December 6	Defeated Zennichi Shin Jidai (Yuma Aoyagi and Kento Miyahara) in the final to earn a World Tag Team Championship match. They challenged The Saito Brothers (Jun Saito and Rei Saito) for the titles on the third night of the Giant Series tour, but was unsuccessful.

=== BJW ===
Accomplishment	Winner(s)	Date won	Notes
Saikyo Tag League	Abdullah Kobayashi and Daiju Wakamatsu	February 13 (aired February 21)	Defeated Crazy Lovers (Masashi Takeda and Takumi Tsukamoto) in the final to win. This was a Fluorescent Lighttube Deathmatch.
Soushi Sousatsu Deathmatch Tag Tournament	Crazy Lovers (Masashi Takeda and Takumi Tsukamoto)	December 5	Defeated Yuki Ishikawa and Daiju Wakamatsu in the final to earn a BJW Tag Team Championship match. This was a Fluorescent Light Tubes and Glass Board Deathmatch. They defeated Astronauts (Fuminori Abe and Takuya Nomura) to win the titles on December 30.
Toshiwasure! Shuffle Six Man Tag Team Tournament	Daisuke Sekimoto, Fuminori Abe, and Tetsuya Endo	December 31	Defeated Harashima, Kota Sekifuda, and Yuji Hino in the final to win.

=== CF ===
==== DDT ====
Accomplishment	Winner(s)	Date won	Notes
No Fee Rumble	Fuminori Abe	January 29	Last eliminated Sanshiro Takagi to win.
D Generations Cup	Takeshi Masada	February 26	Defeated Yuya Koroku in the final to win.
King of DDT Tournament	Chris Brookes	May 21	Defeated Kazusada Higuchi in the final to earn a KO-D Openweight Championship match. He would defeat Yuji Hino at Wrestle Peter Pan to win the title.
KO-D 6-Man Tag Team Championship 1-Day Tournament	D・O・A (Danshoku "Dandy" Dino, Jun Akiyama, and Makoto Oishi)	November 11	Defeated The37Kamiina (Mao, Toy Kojima, and Yuki Ueno) in the final to win the vacant titles.
Toshiwasure! Shuffle Six Man Tag Team Tournament	Daisuke Sekimoto, Fuminori Abe, and Tetsuya Endo	December 31	Defeated Harashima, Kota Sekifuda, and Yuji Hino in the final to win.

==== Noah ====
Accomplishment	Winner(s)	Date won	Notes
Scramble Shuffle Tag Tournament	Katsuhiko Nakajima and Seiki Yoshioka	January 8	Defeated Satoshi Kojima and Shuji Kondo in the final to win.
N-1 Rumble	Manabu Soya	August 5	Last eliminated Jack Morris to win.
GHC Junior Heavyweight Tag Team Championship #1 Contender's Tournament	Atsushi Kotoge and Hi69	August 11	Defeated Good Looking Guys (Tadasuke and Yo-Hey) in the final to earn a GHC Junior Heavyweight Tag Team Championship match. They challenged Stinger (Chris Ridgeway and Daga) for the titles at the finals of the N-1 Victory, but were unsuccessful.
N-1 Victory	Go Shiozaki	September 3	Defeated Kenoh in the final to earn a GHC Heavyweight Championship match. He challenged Jake Lee for the title at Grand Ship in Nagoya, but was unsuccessful.

==== TJPW ====
Accomplishment	Winner(s)	Date won	Notes
Princess of the Decade Tournament	Rika Tatsumi	January 30	Defeated Shoko Nakajima in the final to win.
"Futari wa Princess" Max Heart Tournament	121000000 (Maki Itoh and Miyu Yamashita)	February 11	Defeated Kyoraku Kyomei (Hyper Misao and Shoko Nakajima) in the final to earn a Princess Tag Team Championship match. They would defeat Wasteland War Party (Heidi Howitzer and Max the Impaler) at Grand Princess '23 to win the titles.
Shinagawa Three Woman Festival	Yuki Aino, Pom Harajuku, and Raku	April 29 (aired May 2)	Defeated Kaya Toribami and Kyoraku Kyomei (Hyper Misao and Shoko Nakajima) in the final to win.
Tokyo Princess Cup	Miyu Yamashita	August 13	Defeated Yuki Kamifuku in the final to earn a Princess of Princess Championship match. She would defeat Mizuki to win the title at Wrestle Princess IV.
Next Generation Tournament	Wakana Uehara	December 1	Defeated Himawari in the final to win.

==== GanPro ====
Accomplishment	Winner(s)	Date won	Notes
Young Ganbare Cup	Yumehito Imanari	January 28	Defeated Kentaro Hachisu in the final.
Spirit of Ganbare World Tag Team Championship Tournament	Hentai Punch Drunkers (Hikaru Sato and Tyson Maeguchi)	May 5	Defeated Uruseez (Tatsuhito Takaiwa and Yumehito Imanari) in the final to become the inaugural champions.

=== CMLL ===
Accomplishment	Winner(s)	Date won	Notes
Rey del Aire VIP	Dragón Rojo Jr.	January 28	Last eliminated Templario to win.
Torneo Increíble de Parejas	Averno and Místico	February 17	Defeated Soberano Jr. and Templario in the final.
Interfaction Tag Team Tournament	Los Guerreros de la Atlantida (Atlantis Jr. and Último Guerrero)	February 26	Defeated Los Ingobernables de Japon (Bushi and Titán) in the final to win.
Torneo de Escuelas	Team Guadalajara (Ángel Rebelde, Explosivo, Crixus, Adrenalina, Fantastico, and Vaquero Jr.)	March 3	Defeated Team CDMX (Neon, Max Star, Futuro, Vegas, Historico, and Tonalli) in the final to win.
Copa Irma Gonzalez	Princesa Sugehit	March 17	Last eliminated Reyna Isis to win.
Occidente Women's Tag Team Championship Tournament	Stephanie Vaquer and Zeuxis	March 21	Defeated Las Chicas Indomables (La Jarochita and Lluvia) in the final to become the inaugural champions.
Torneo Nueva Generación Cibernético	Rey Samuray	April 3	Defeated Max Star, Ángel Rebelde, Crixus, Tonalli, Multy, Neón, Hijo de Stuka Jr, Vaquero Jr & Brillante Jr. to win.
CMLL Universal Championship	Dragón Rojo Jr.	April 28	Defeated Atlantis Jr. and Templario in the final to become the champion.
Torneo Embajador de Los Niños Cibernético	Volcano	April 30	Defeated Volador Jr., El Satánico, Akuma, Raider, and Captain Suicida to win.
Torneo Cinco de Mayo	Pegasso	May 8	Defeated Asturiano, Espíritu Maligno, Dark Soul, Millenium, Multy, Hijo de Centalla Roja, Rey Samuray, Perverso, and Prayer to win.
La Copa Junior VIP	Soberano Jr.	May 26	Defeated Dragón Rojo Jr. in the final to win.
Mexican National Middleweight Championship Tournament	Guerrero Maya Jr.	June 2	Defeated Rugido in the final to win the vacant title.
Copa Dinastías	Místico and Dr. Karonte I	June 18	Defeated Stuka Jr. and Hijo de Stuka Jr. in the final to win.
Leyenda de Plata	Mascara Dorada	July 28	Defeated Rocky Romero in the final to win.
Mexican National Lightweight Championship Tournament	Futuro	July 30	Defeated Gallo Jr, Max Star, Meyer, Brillante Jr., Rafaga Jr., Raya Metalico, and Misterio Blanco in the final to win the vacant title.
International Gran Prix	Místico	August 18	Last eliminated Hiromu Takahashi to win for Team Mexico.
Copa Independencia	Esfinge	September 16	Defeated Rugido in the final to win.
CMLL Universal Amazons Championship	La Catalina	October 20	Defeated Zeuxis in the final to become the champion.
International Women's Gran Prix	Tessa Blanchard	October 27	Last eliminated Stephanie Vaquer to win for Team International.
Rey del Inframundo	Bárbaro Cavernario	October 31-November 3	Last eliminated Stuka Jr. to win the cibernetico.
Copa Mujeres Revolucionarias	Reyna Isis	November 19	Defeated La Catalina in the final to win.
Leyenda de Azul	Hechicero	November 24	Defeated Stuka Jr. in the final to win.

=== The Crash ===
Accomplishment	Winner(s)	Date won	Notes
Copa Juvenil	Anubis	January 28	Defeated Dark Warrior, Aztec Fly, Noisy Boy, POD, and Rey Astral to win.
Torneo Padrinos de Luja	Cibernético and Tonalli	September 1	Defeated Dr. Wagner Jr. and Black Destiny in the final to win.

=== CZW ===
Accomplishment	Winner(s)	Date won	Notes
Best of the Best	Rich Swann	May 10	Defeated Fred Yehi in the final to win the vacant CZW World Heavyweight Championship.
Tournament of Death	Big Joe	October 7	Defeated Bobby Beverly, Shlak, and Mickie Knuckles in the finals to win.
Milk Chocolate Succulent #1 Contender's Gauntlet Match	CMD (Boom Harden and Desean Pratt)	November 5	Last eliminated Milk Chocolate (Brandon Watts & Randy Summers) to earn a CZW World Tag Team Championship match. They challenged Milk Chocolate for the titles at Live at the Battleship but were unsuccessful.

=== DG ===
Accomplishment	Winner(s)	Date won	Notes
Rey de Parejas	D'courage (Yuki Yoshioka and Madoka Kikuta)	March 2	Defeated M3K (Susumu Mochizuki and Yasushi Kanda) in the final to earn an Open the Twin Gate Championship match. They challenged Natural Vibes (Big Boss Shimizu and Kzy) for the titles on Night 2 of Champion Gate in Osaka, but were unsuccessful.
King of Gate	Kota Minoura	August 3	Defeated Big Boss Shimizu in the final to earn an Open the Dream Gate Championship match. He challenged Madoka Kikuta for the title at Dangerous Gate but was unsuccessful.
Open the Triangle Gate Championship Tournament	Dragon Kid, Punch Tominaga, and Yamato	October 6	Defeated Gold Class (Ben-K, Kota Minoura, and Naruki Doi) and D'courage (Dragon Dia, Madoka Kikuta, and Yuki Yoshioka) in the final to win the vacant titles. This was a three-way elimination match.

=== GCW ===
Accomplishment	Winner(s)	Date won	Notes
Do or Die Rumble	Masha Slamovich	January 1	Last eliminated Blake Christian to earn a GCW World Championship match. She would defeat Nick Gage at Eye for an Eye to win the title.
Jersey J-Cup	Jordan Oliver	February 11	Defeated Mike Bailey in the final to win the revived JCW World Championship. The title had been inactive since 2004.
Grab the Brass Ring DLC match	Blake Christian	March 31	Defeated Komander, Tony Deppen, Gringo Loco, Shane Mercer, Alec Price, Cole Radrick, Jack Cartwheel, and Billie Starkz to earn a GCW World Championship match. Christian invoked his opportunity to enter the title match between Masha Slamovich and Rina Yamashita at Cage of Survival 2, winning the title in the process.
Tournament of Survival	Rina Yamashita	June 3	Defeated John Wayne Murdoch in the final to win a GCW World Championship match at Cage of Survival 2. She challenged Masha Slamovich for the title at the event but was unsuccessful.
Nick Gage Invitational	Miedo Extremo	December 30	Defeated John Wayne Murdoch in the final to win.
Do or Die Rumble	Mance Warner	December 31	Last eliminated Effy to earn a GCW World Championship match at the time and place of his choosing. Warner would use his opportunity to immediately win the title from Joey Janela at Cage of Survival 3.
Battlebowl Battle Royal	Griffin McCoy	December 31	Last eliminated Josh Bishop to earn a JCW World Championship match. He challenged Jordan Oliver for the title in the first round of the Jersey J-Cup Tournament but was unsuccessful.

=== Gleat ===
Accomplishment	Winner(s)	Date won	Notes
Unit One Night Tournament	Black Generation International (Hartley Jackson, Kaito Ishida, and Kotaro Suzuki)	February 15	Defeated Strong Hearts (Cima, T-Hawk, and El Lindaman) in the final to win.
Lidet UWF World Championship Tournament	Takanori Ito	June 7	Defeated Shinya Aoki in the final to become the inaugural champion.
G-Infinity Championship #1 Contender's Tournament	Bulk Orchestra (Kazma Sakamoto and Quiet Storm)	November 3	Defeated Black Generation International (Hartley Jackson and Keiichi Sato) in the final to earn a G-Infinity Championship match. They challenged Voodoo Murders (Jun Saito and Rei Saito) for the titles at G Prowrestling Ver. 65 ~ Burn Your Heart, but were unsuccessful.
Lidet UWF World Championship Next Challenger Tournament	Minoru Tanaka	December 10	Defeated Tetsuya Izuchi in the final to earn a Lidet UWF Championship match. He challenged Fujita "Jr." Hayato for the title at Gleat Ver. 7 but was unsuccessful.

=== Ice Ribbon ===
Accomplishment	Winner(s)	Date won	Notes
ICE×∞ Championship #1 Contender's Tournament	Mifu Ashida	October 9	Defeated Kyuri in the final to earn an ICE×∞ Championship match. She challenged Ibuki Hoshi for the title on November 11 but was unsuccessful.

=== Impact ===
Accomplishment	Winner(s)	Date won	Notes
8-4-1 match (Men)	Nick Aldis	June 9	Defeated Bully Ray, Heath, Jonathan Gresham, Mike Bailey, Moose, PCO, and Rich Swann to earn an Impact World Championship match at Slammiversary. He challenged Alex Shelley for the title at the event but was unsuccessful.
Impact World Tag Team Championship #1 Contender's Tournament	The Rascalz (Trey Miguel and Zachary Wentz)	July 29 (aired August 17)	Defeated Rich Swann and Sami Callihan in the final to earn an Impact World Tag Team Championship match at Emergence. They defeated Subculture (Mark Andrews and Flash Morgan Webster) to win the titles at the event.
Impact Knockouts World Championship #1 Contender's Battle Royal	Alisha Edwards	August 28 (aired August 31)	Last eliminated Jody Threat and KiLynn King to earn an Impact Knockouts World Championship match at Victory Road. She challenged Trinity for the title at the event but was unsuccessful.
Feast or Fired	Chris Bey, Crazzy Steve, Moose, and Yuya Uemura	September 9 (aired September 14)	Each won a briefcase for a future title opportunity or a pink slip. The contents of the cases were revealed the following week: Steve (Case 1 – Impact Digital Media Championship) – Steve invoked his opportunity to challenge Tommy Dreamer on the November 9 episode of Impact!, where he won by disqualification.; Moose (Case 2 – Impact World Championship) – Moose invoked his opportunity to defeat Alex Shelley to win the title at Hard To Kill.; Bey (Case 3 – Impact World Tag Team Championship) – Bey invoked his opportunity with Ace Austin to defeat The Rascalz (Trey Miguel and Zachary Wentz) to win the titles at Bound for Glory.; Uemura (Case 4 – Pink Slip) – Uemura was fired legitimately.
Call Your Shot Gauntlet	Jordynne Grace	October 21	Last eliminated Bully Ray to win the Call Your Shot Trophy for a championship opportunity of her choosing. Grace invoked her opportunity to defeat Trinity to win the Impact Knockouts World Championship at Hard To Kill.
Gravy Train Turkey Trot	Jake Something, Johnny Swinger, Mike Bailey, and PCO	October 22 (aired November 23)	Defeated Champagne Singh, Jai Vidal, and The Good Hands (John Skyler and Jason Hotch) to win. As Vidal took the fall, he was forced to wear a turkey suit.
Glasgow Cup	Joe Hendry	October 26 (aired November 2)	Defeated Frankie Kazarian in the final to win.

=== IWRG ===
Accomplishment	Winner(s)	Date won	Notes
El Protector	Hip Hop Man and Shocko	February 19	Defeated El Hijo del Alebrije and Baby Star, Baby Star and La Momia, Cerebro Negro Jr. and Travis Banks, El Hijo del Fishman and Rey Halcon Jr., Hellboy and Wesley Pipes, Imposible and Noisy Boy, and Maniacop and Yorvak to win.
IWRG Tryout Tournament	Gannicus	March 5	Defeated Fussion in the final to win.
Rebelión de los Juniors	El Hijo del Alebrije	March 19	Defeated Cerebro Negro Jr., Apolo Estrada Jr., Brazo de Oro Jr., El Hijo de L.A. Park, Galeno Del Mal, Principe Arkano, and Villano V Jr. to win.
Guerra del Golfo	Hell Boy	April 16	Defeated Shocko in a hair vs. hair final to win.
Rey del Ring	El Hijo de Pirata Morgan	May 7	Last eliminated Travis Banks to win.
IWRG World Lucha Libre Championship Tournament	Vito Fratelli	June 4	Defeated Hell Boy in the final to become the inaugural champion.
Cero Cuerdas	Karaoui	September 24	Defeated Judas el Traidor in the final to win.

=== M-Pro ===
Accomplishment	Winner(s)	Date won	Notes
Kanjin Oogama League	OSO11	February 25	Defeated Ayumi Gunji in the final to win.

=== MLW ===
Accomplishment	Winner(s)	Date won	Notes
Battle Riot	Alex Kane	April 8	Last eliminated Davey Boy Smith Jr. to earn an MLW World Heavyweight Championship match. He would defeat Alexander Hammerstone to win the title at Never Say Never.
Opera Cup	Davey Boy Smith Jr.	April 8	Defeated Tracy Williams in the final to win the Opera Cup Trophy.

=== NJPW ===
Accomplishment	Winner(s)	Date won	Notes
NJPW World Television Championship Tournament	Zack Sabre Jr.	January 4	Defeated Ren Narita in the final to become the inaugural champion.
New Japan Ranbo	Great-O-Khan, Sho, Shingo Takagi, and Toru Yano	January 4	Determined the challengers for the Provisional KOPW 2023 Championship at New Year Dash!!, which was won by Takagi.
Interfaction Tag Team Tournament	Los Guerreros de la Atlantida (Atlantis Jr. and Último Guerrero)	February 26	Defeated Los Ingobernables de Japon (Bushi and Titán) in the final to win.
New Japan Cup	Sanada	March 21	Defeated David Finlay in the final to win an IWGP World Heavyweight Championship match. He would defeat Kazuchika Okada to win the title at Sakura Genesis.
Strong Women's Championship Tournament	Willow Nightingale	May 21	Defeated Mercedes Moné in the final to become the inaugural champion.
Best of the Super Juniors	Master Wato	May 28	Defeated Titán to earn an IWGP Junior Heavyweight Championship match at Dominion 6.4 in Osaka-jo Hall. He challenged Hiromu Takahashi for the title but was unsuccessful.
IWGP United States Heavyweight Championship #1 Contender's Tournament	Will Ospreay	June 4	Defeated Lance Archer in the final for an IWGP United States Heavyweight Championship match. He defeated Kenny Omega to win the title at Forbidden Door.
G1 Climax	Tetsuya Naito	August 13	Defeated Kazuchika Okada in the final for an IWGP World Heavyweight Championship match at Wrestle Kingdom 18. He defeated Sanada to win the title at the event.
Philly Cheesesteak Cup ladder match	Douki and Low Rider	August 19	Defeated Hiromu Takahashi and Rocky Romero, and Blake Christian and Master Wato to win.
All Star Jr. Festival USA Tournament	Mike Bailey	August 19	Defeated Kevin Knight in the final to earn an IWGP Junior Heavyweight Championship match. He and Yoh challenged Hiromu Takahashi for the title in a three-way match at Destruction in Ryōgoku, but neither man was successful.
Super Junior Tag League	Catch 2/2 (TJP and Francesco Akira)	November 4	Defeated House of Torture (Sho and Yoshinobu Kanemaru) in the final to earn an IWGP Junior Heavyweight Tag Team Championship match at Wrestle Kingdom 18. They defeated Bullet Club War Dogs (Clark Connors and Drilla Moloney) to win the titles at the event.
World Tag League	Bishamon (Hirooki Goto and Yoshi-Hashi)	December 10	Defeated Guerrillas of Destiny (El Phantasmo and Hikuleo) in the final to win. Bishamon would become the first team to win three consecutive tournaments. As Bishamon are the current IWGP Tag Team Champions, they could choose their challengers at Wrestle Kingdom 18. They agreed to face Guerrillas of Destiny in a title vs. title match also for their Strong Openweight Tag Team Championship, which Guerrillas of Destiny win.

=== NWA ===
Accomplishment	Winner(s)	Date won	Notes
Champions Series	Team Rock 'n' Roll (Kerry Morton, Chris Adonis, Matthew Mims, Alex Taylor, Dak Draper, Taya Valkyrie, La Rosa Negra, Madi Wrenkowski, and Ricky Morton)	January 31	Defeated Team Tyrus (Tyrus, Trevor Murdoch, EC3, "Thrillbilly" Silas Mason, Carnage, Allysin Kay, Robyn Renegade, Samantha Starr, and Rolando Freeman) in the final to earn title opportunities for each team member.: Mims utilized his opportunity to challenge Jordan Clearwater for the NWA World Television Championship on the February 7 Powerrr, but was unsuccessful.; Taylor utilized his opportunity to challenge Kerry Morton for the NWA World Junior Heavyweight Championship at Nuff Said, but was unsuccessful.; Wrenkowski utilized her opportunity with Missa Kate to win the NWA World Women's Tag Team Championship from Pretty Empowered 2.0 (Ella Envy and Roxy) on the February 21 episode of Powerrr.; Draper utilized his opportunity with Matthew Mims to challenge La Rebelión (Bestia 666 and Mecha Wolf) for the NWA World Tag Team Championship at NWA 312, but they were unsuccessful.; La Rosa Negra used her opportunity to challenge Kamille for the NWA World Women's Championship at NWA 312, but was unsuccessful.; Adonis used his opportunity to challenge Tyrus for the NWA Worlds Heavyweight Championship at NWA 312, but was unsuccessful.
NWA World Women's Television Championship Tournament	Kenzie Paige	April 7	Defeated Max the Impaler in the final to become the inaugural champion.
Bob Luce Memorial Battle Royal	"Thrillbilly" Silas Mason	April 7	Last eliminated Odinson to earn an NWA National Heavyweight Championship match. He challenged EC3 for the title on Night 1 of the Crockett Cup, but was unsuccessful.
Crockett Cup	Mike Knox and Trevor Murdoch	June 4	Defeated Blunt Force Trauma (Carnage and Damage) in the final to win the Crockett Cup Trophy and an NWA World Tag Team Championship match. They challenged Blunt Force Trauma (Carnage and Damage) for the titles on Night 2 of NWA 75, but were unsuccesul.
NWA United States Tag Team Championship Showdown	Daisy Kill and Talos	August 26	Defeated The Fixers (Jay Bradley and Wrecking Ball Legursky) in the final to earn an NWA United States Tag Team Championship on Night 2 of NWA 75. They would later defeat The Country Gentlemen (AJ Cazana and Anthony Andrews) to win the titles at the event.
Jubilee Jamboree match	Jack Cartwheel	August 26	Defeated Alex Taylor, Eric Jackson, Koa Laxamana, and Matt Vine to earn an NWA World Junior Heavyweight Championship match on Night 2 of NWA 75. He challenged Colby Corino for the title at the event but was unsuccessful.
Burke Invitational Gauntlet	Kenzie Paige	August 26	Last eliminated Allysin Kay to win the Burke Cup Trophy and an NWA World Women's Championship match on Night 2 of NWA 75. She defeated Kamille to win the title at the event.
Austin Idol's National Championship Battle Royal	Jordan Clearwater	August 27	Last eliminated Zyon to earn an NWA National Heavyweight Championship match later that night. He subsequently challenged Silas Mason for the title but was unsuccessful.
NWA World Television Championship Qualifier Tournament	Mims	August 29 (aired October 10)	Defeated Zicky Dice in the final to win the vacant NWA World Television Championship.
Christmas Wish Battle Royal	The Slimeballz (Sage Chantz and Tommy Rant)	November 4 (aired December 26)	Chantz last eliminated Blake Troop of SVGS to earn a tag team championship match of their choosing at Paranoia. They chose to challenge The Immortals (J. R. Kratos and Odinson) for the NWA United States Tag Team Championship, but were unsuccessful in winning the titles.

=== Progress ===
Accomplishment	Winner(s)	Date won	Notes
Progress World Women's Championship #1 Contender's Thunderbastard	Rhio	January 22	Defeated Dani Luna, Millie McKenzie, Lizzy Evo, Raven Creed, and Skye Smitson to earn a Progress Wrestling World Women's Championship match. She would defeat Lana Austin to win the title at Chapter 158: The Long Halloween
Super Strong Style 16	Kid Lykos	May 29	Defeated Mark Haskins in the final for a PROGRESS World Championship match. Nigel McGuinness was the special guest referee. He challenged Spike Trivet for the title at Chapter 157: Hungry Like The Wolf, but was unsuccessful.

=== PWG ===
Accomplishment	Winner(s)	Date won	Notes
Battle of Los Angeles	Mike Bailey	January 8	Defeated Konosuke Takeshita in the final for a PWG World Championship match. He challenged Daniel Garcia for the title in a 60-minute iron man match at PWG Twenty: Mystery Vortex, but lost 4–3 in sudden death overtime.

=== ROH ===
Accomplishment	Winner(s)	Date won	Notes
"Reach for the Sky" ladder match	The Lucha Brothers (Penta El Zero Miedo and Rey Fénix)	March 31	Defeated Top Flight (Darius Martin and Dante Martin), The Kingdom (Matt Taven and Mike Bennett), Aussie Open (Mark Davis and Kyle Fletcher), and La Facción Ingobernable (Rush and Dralístico) to win the vacant ROH World Tag Team Championship.
ROH World Television Championship Eliminator Tournament	Dalton Castle	July 15 (aired July 20)	Defeated Shane Taylor in the final to earn an ROH World Television Championship match at Death Before Dishonor. He challenged Samoa Joe for the title at the event but was unsuccessful.
ROH World Television Championship Eliminator Tournament	Shane Taylor	August 5 (aired August 10)	Defeated Gravity in the final to earn an ROH World Television Championship match. He challenged Samoa Joe for the title at All Out but was unsuccessful.
Survival of the Fittest	Kyle Fletcher	December 15	Defeated Komander, Bryan Keith, Lee Moriarty, Dalton Castle and Lee Johnson in the final to win the ROH World Television Championship.

=== RevPro ===
Accomplishment	Winner(s)	Date won	Notes
Revolution Rumble Entry Tournament	Joshua James	March 19	Defeated Yota Tsuji in the final to earn a spot in the Revolution Rumble match.
Revolution Rumble match	Michael Oku	March 26	Last eliminated Gabriel Kidd to earn an Undisputed British Heavyweight Championship match. He would defeat Great-O-Khan to win the title at Epic Encounter.
British J-Cup	Leon Slater	October 21	Defeated Wild Boar, Máscara Dorada, and Harrison Bennett in the final to earn a future Undisputed British Cruiserweight Championship match. This was a four-way elimination match. He defeated Connor Mills to win the title at Uprising.
Great British Tag League	Greedy Souls (Brendan White and Danny Jones)	December 16	Defeated Anthony Ogogo and Ricky Knight Jr. in the final to earn a future Undisputed British Tag Team Championship match.

=== Stardom ===
Accomplishment	Winner(s)	Date won	Notes
Naniwa Roulette	Saki Kashima	February 4	Last eliminated Fukigen Death to earn an opportunity at any championship of her choosing. She would challenge for the High Speed Championship and defeat champion AZM and Fukigen Death to win the title at Flashing Champions.
Triangle Derby	Prominence (Risa Sera, Suzu Suzuki, and Hiragi Kurumi)	March 4	Defeated Abarenbo GE (Syuri, Mirai, and Ami Sourei) in the final to win. Prominence's Artist of Stardom Championship was also on the line.
New Blood Tag Team Championship Tournament	Bloody Fate	March 25	Defeated God's Eye (Mirai and Tomoka Inaba) in the final to become the inaugural champions.
Cinderella Tournament	Mirai	April 15	Defeated Mai Sakurai to earn a "wish" of whatever she so desired. She wished to challenge Tam Nakano for the Wonder of Stardom Championship, which she won at Mid Summer Champions.
Yokohama Rumble match	Mai Sakurai	April 23	Last eliminated Super Strong Stardom Giant Machine to win.
Fukuoka Rumble match	Suzu Suzuki	May 4	Last eliminated Mai Sakurai to win.
High Speed Rumble match	Mei Seira	June 17	Last eliminated Saki Kashima to win.
5 Star Grand Prix Rumble match	Mariah May and Hanan	June 18	Determined the wild card entrants in the 5 Star Grand Prix.
5 Star Grand Prix	Suzu Suzuki	September 30	Defeated Maika in the final to earn a championship match of her choosing. She chose to challenge for the World of Stardom Championship, but was defeated by Maika for the vacant title at Dream Queendom 3.
Special Stardom Tournament	Syuri	October 22	Defeated Mina Shirakawa in the final to win.
Goddesses of Stardom Tag League	Divine Kingdom (Maika and Megan Bayne)	November 12	Defeated Crazy Star (Mei Seira and Suzu Suzuki) in the final to earn a Goddesses of Stardom Championship match. They competed against AphrOditE (Utami Hayashishita and Saya Kamitani) for the vacant titles at Nagoya Big Winter, but were unsuccessful in winning them.
Moneyball Tournament	Baribari Bombers (Giulia, Thekla and Mai Sakurai)	November 18	Defeated Stars (Hazuki, Hanan and Saya Iida) in the final to win. This was a tables, ladders, and chairs match where Baribari Bombers retained the Artist of Stardom Championship.
World of Stardom Championship New Champion Advance Tournament	Maika	November 28	Defeated Momo Watanabe in the final to enter the World of Stardom Championship match at Dream Queendom 3. She defeated Suzu Suzuki to win the vacant title at the event.

=== Zero1 ===
==== Zero1 Japan ====
Accomplishment	Winner(s)	Date won	Notes
Fire Festival	Junya Matsunaga	July 29 (aired August 12)	Defeated Kengo Mashimo in the final to win.
Tenkaichi Junior	Ryo Hoshino	October 27	Defeated Shingo in the final to win.
Furinkazan Tag Tournament	Masato Tanaka and Yoshikazu Yokoyama	November 25	Defeated Leo Isaka and Shoki Kitamura in the final to win.

=== Tenryu Project ===
Accomplishment	Winner(s)	Date won	Notes
Tenryu Project United National Tag Team Championship Tournament	Atsuki Aoyagi and Yuma Aoyagi	June 10	Defeated Masayuki Kono and Yusuke Kodama in the final to become the inaugural champions.
Ryūkon Cup	Kengo	November 19	Defeated Keita Yano in the final to win.

=== XPW ===
Accomplishment	Winner(s)	Date won	Notes
King of the Deathmatch Tournament	Drake Younger	April 22	Defeated Masada, Shane Mercer, and Aeroboy in the final to win an immediate XPW King of the Deathmatch Championship match. He challenged Shlak for the title but was unsuccessful.

=== WOW ===
Accomplishment	Winner(s)	Date	Notes
WOW Trios Championship Tournament	Top Tier (Coach Campanelli, Gloria Glitter, and Kandi Krush)	December 14 (aired March 17, 2024)	Defeated eXile (Genesis, Exodus, and Ice Cold) in the final to win the WOW Trios Trophy and become the inaugural champions.

=== wXw ===
Accomplishment	Winner(s)	Date won	Notes
Ambition 14	Fuminori Abe	March 11	Defeated Thomas Shire in the final to win.
16 Carat Gold Tournament	Shigehiro Irie	March 12	Defeated Axel Tischer in the final to win the vacant wXw Unified World Wrestling Championship.
Fight for Paris III	Thiago Montero	March 19	Defeated Norman Harras, Peter Tihanyi, and Kuro in the final to win.
Femmes Fatales	Nicole Matthews	September 23	Defeated Hyan in the finals to earn a wXw Women's Championship match. She challenged Ava Everett for the title on Night 3 of the World Tag Team Festival but was unsuccessful.
World Tag Team Festival	Cash & Hektor (Dennis Dullnig and Hektor Invictus	September 24	Won the wXw World Tag Team Championship after defeating champions Amboss (Laurance Roman and Robert Dreissker) and Renegades (Mizuki Watase and Shigehiro Irie) in the final.

=== WWE ===
Accomplishment	Winner(s)	Date won	Notes
WWE Raw Tag Team Championship #1 Contender's Tag Team Turmoil	The Judgment Day (Finn Bálor, Damian Priest, and Dominik Mysterio)	January 9	Priest and Mysterio, who filled in for Bálor after the latter sustained an injury, last eliminated The Street Profits (Montez Ford and Angelo Dawkins) to earn a WWE Raw Tag Team Championship match at Raw is XXX. Priest and Mysterio challenged The Usos (Jey Uso and Jimmy Uso), the latter later being replaced by Sami Zayn due to injury, for the titles but were unsuccessful.
NXT Women's Championship #1 Contender's Battle Royal	Gigi Dolin and Jacy Jayne	January 10	Both were declared co-winners after hitting the floor simultaneously. Dolin and Jayne subsequently challenged Roxanne Perez for the NXT Women's Championship in a triple threat match at NXT Vengeance Day, but both were unsuccessful in winning the title.
Royal Rumble match (Women)	Rhea Ripley	January 28	Last eliminated Liv Morgan to earn a women's world championship match at WrestleMania 39. Ripley successfully challenged Charlotte Flair to win the SmackDown Women's Championship (which was renamed as the Women's World Championship in June).
Royal Rumble match (Men)	Cody Rhodes	January 28	Last eliminated Gunther to earn a men's world championship match at WrestleMania 39. Rhodes challenged Roman Reigns for the Undisputed WWE Universal Championship, but was unsuccessful in winning the title.
SmackDown Tag Team Championship #1 Contender Tournament	Braun Strowman and Ricochet	February 4	Defeated Imperium (Ludwig Kaiser and Giovanni Vinci) in the final to earn a SmackDown Tag Team Championship match. They challenged The Usos (Jey Uso and Jimmy Uso) on the February 10 episode of SmackDown, but were unsuccessful in winning the titles.
André the Giant Memorial Battle Royal	Bobby Lashley	March 31	Last eliminated Bronson Reed to win the André the Giant Memorial Trophy.
WWE Intercontinental Championship #1 Contender's Battle Royal	Mustafa Ali	May 15	Last eliminated Bronson Reed and Ricochet to earn a WWE Intercontinental Championship match at Night of Champions. He challenged Gunther for the title, but was unsuccessful.
World Heavyweight Championship Tournament	Seth "Freakin" Rollins	May 27	Defeated AJ Styles in the finals of 12-man tournament to determine the inaugural World Heavyweight Champion of the Raw brand.
NXT Women's Championship Tournament	Tiffany Stratton	May 28	Defeated Lyra Valkyria in the final to win the vacant NXT Women's Championship.
NXT Women's Championship #1 Contender's Battle Royal	Thea Hail	June 8	Last eliminated Cora Jade and Dana Brooke to earn an NXT Women's Championship match. She challenged Tiffany Stratton for the title on Night 2 of NXT: Gold Rush, but was unsuccessful.
Money in the Bank ladder match (Women)	Iyo Sky	July 1	Defeated Bayley, Becky Lynch, Trish Stratus, Zelina Vega, and Zoey Stark in a six-woman ladder match to earn a women's world championship match contract. She subsequently cashed in on the WWE Women's Championship and won the title from Bianca Belair at SummerSlam.
Money in the Bank ladder match (Men)	Damian Priest	July 1	Defeated Butch, LA Knight, Shinsuke Nakamura, Logan Paul, Ricochet, and Santos Escobar in a seven-man ladder match to earn a men's championship match contract. He subsequently cashed in on the World Heavyweight Championship and won the title from Drew McIntyre on Night 1 of WrestleMania XL.
WWE United States Championship Invitational	Santos Escobar	July 28	Defeated Rey Mysterio in the final to earn a WWE United States Championship match. He was scheduled to challenge Austin Theory for the title on the August 11 episode of SmackDown, but was constantly attacked by Theory before the match and was not able to compete. Mysterio took his place and subsequently won the title.
Slim Jim SummerSlam Battle Royal	LA Knight	August 5	Last eliminated Sheamus in a 25-man battle royal to win.
NXT Global Heritage Invitational	Butch	September 26	Defeated Joe Coffey in the final for an NXT Heritage Cup match at NXT No Mercy. He challenged Noam Dar for the title at the event but was unsuccessful.
Bada Bing Bada Boom Battle Royal	Chase University (Andre Chase and Duke Hudson)	October 17	Last eliminated Angel Garza and Humberto Carrillo to earn an NXT Tag Team Championship match on Week 1 of NXT: Halloween Havoc. They would defeat The Family (Tony D'Angelo and Channing "Stacks" Lorenzo) to win the titles at the event.
NXT Breakout Tournament (Women)	Lola Vice	October 31	Defeated Kelani Jordan in the final to earn a women's championship match at a time and place of her choosing. She would use her contract to enter the NXT Women's Championship match between Lyra Valkyria and Roxanne Perez at NXT Vengeance Day, but was unsuccessful in winning the title.
Women's World Championship #1 Contender's Battle Royal	Zoey Stark	November 6	Last eliminated Shayna Baszler to earn a Women's World Championship match at Survivor Series: WarGames. She challenged Rhea Ripley for the title at the event but was unsuccessful.
Unidsputed WWE Tag Team Championship #1 Contender's Tag Team Turmoil	The Creed Brothers (Brutus Creed and Julius Creed)	November 27	Last eliminated Imperium (Ludwig Kaiser and Giovanni Vinci) to earn an Undisputed WWE Tag Team Championship match. They challenged The Judgment Day (Finn Bálor and Damian Priest) for the titles on the December 18 episode of Raw, but were unsuccessful.
Iron Survivor Challenge (Women)	Blair Davenport	December 9	Defeated Tiffany Stratton, Lash Legend, Kelani Jordan, and Fallon Henley to earn an NXT Women's Championship match at NXT: New Year's Evil. She challenged Lyra Valkyria for the title at the event but was unsuccessful.
Iron Survivor Challenge (Men)	Trick Williams	December 9	Defeated Dijak, Josh Briggs, Bron Breakker, and Tyler Bate to earn an NXT Championship match at NXT: New Year's Evil. He was scheduled to challenge Ilja Dragunov for the title at the event, but due to Dragunov sustaining a kayfabe injury two weeks prior, the match was postponed to NXT Vengeance Day, where he was unsuccessful in winning the title.

== Title changes ==
=== 2AW ===
2AW Openweight Championship
Incoming champion – Ayato Yoshida
Date	Winner	Event/Show	Note(s)
July 23	Kohei Sato	Grand Slam in TKP Garden City Chiba	
October 29	Takuro Niki	Grand Slam in TKP Garden City Chiba	

2AW Tag Team Championship
Incoming champions – Koen (Takuro Niki and Tatsuya Hanami)
Date	Winner	Event/Show	Note(s)
April 23	Buttobe Missile Kickers (Taishi Takizawa and Daiju Wakamatsu)	Grand Slam in 2AW Square	
July 23	Bug's Mutation (Ayumu Honda and Chango)	Grand Slam in TKP Garden City Chiba	Three-way tag team match also involving Kazma Sakamoto and Kengo Mashimo.
December 3	Kengo Mashimo and Naka Shuma	Grand Slam in Korakuen Hall	

=== AAA ===
AAA Mega Championship
Incoming champion – El Hijo del Vikingo
No title changes.

AAA World Cruiserweight Championship
Incoming champion – Fénix
Date	Winner	Event/Show	Note(s)
July 17	Vacated	—	Fénix vacated the title due to international commitments.
September 23	Komander	Luchando por Mexico	Defeated Mecha Wolf, La Estrella, and Kukai in a four-way elimination match to win the vacant title.

AAA Latin American Championship
Incoming champion – Fénix
Date	Winner	Event/Show	Note(s)
July 17	Vacated	—	Fénix vacated the title due to international commitments.
August 12	Q. T. Marshall	Triplemanía XXXI: Mexico City	Defeated Pentagón Jr., Dralístico, and Texano Jr. in a four-way match to win the vacant title.
November 19	Octagón Jr.	Guerra de Titanes	

AAA Reina de Reinas Championship
Incoming champion – Taya Valkyrie
Date	Winner	Event/Show	Note(s)
August 12	Flammer	Triplemanía XXXI: Mexico City	

AAA World Tag Team Championship
Incoming champions – Vacant
Date	Winner	Event/Show	Note(s)
May 20 (aired June 17)	Arez and Komander	Luchando por Mexico	Defeated Rey Horus and Octagón Jr., and Jack Evans and Myzteziz Jr. to win the vacant titles.
November 11	Nueva Generación Dinamita (Forastero and Sansón)	Guerra de Titanes	

AAA World Mixed Tag Team Championship
Incoming champions – Abismo Negro Jr. and Lady Flammer
No title changes.

AAA World Trios Championship
Incoming champions – Nueva Generación Dinamita (El Cuatrero, Forastero, and Sansón)
Date	Winner	Event/Show	Note(s)
July 21	Los Vipers (Abismo Negro Jr., Psicosis, and Toxin)	Verano de Escandalo	Hijo de Máscara Año 2000 substituted for El Cuatrero.

La Leyenda Azul Blue Demon Championship
Incoming champions – Arez
No title changes.

=== AEW ===
AEW World Championship
Incoming champion – MJF
Date	Winner	Event/Show	Note(s)
December 30	Samoa Joe	Worlds End	

AEW Women's World Championship
Incoming champion – Jamie Hayter
Date	Winner	Event/Show	Note(s)
May 28	Toni Storm	Double or Nothing	
August 2	Hikaru Shida	Dynamite: 200	
August 27	Saraya	All In	Four-way match also involving Dr. Britt Baker, D.M.D. and Toni Storm, who Saraya pinned.
October 10	Hikaru Shida	Dynamite: Title Tuesday	
November 18	"Timeless" Toni Storm	Full Gear	Previously known as just Toni Storm.

AEW All-Atlantic Championship
Incoming champion – Orange Cassidy
On March 15, the title was rebranded as the AEW International Championship.
Date	Winner	Event/Show	Note(s)
September 3	Jon Moxley	All Out	
September 20	Rey Fenix	Dynamite: Grand Slam	
October 10	Orange Cassidy	Dynamite: Title Tuesday	

AEW World Tag Team Championship
Incoming champions – The Acclaimed (Anthony Bowens and Max Caster)
Date	Winner	Event/Show	Note(s)
February 8	The Gunns (Austin Gunn and Colten Gunn)	Dynamite: Championship Fight Night	
April 5	FTR (Dax Harwood and Cash Wheeler)	Dynamite	Title vs. Career match.
October 7	Ricky Starks and Big Bill	Collision	

AEW World Trios Championship
Incoming champions – Death Triangle (Pac, Penta El Zero Miedo, and Rey Fenix)
Date	Winner	Event/Show	Note(s)
January 11	The Elite (Kenny Omega, Matt Jackson, and Nick Jackson)	Dynamite	Escalera de la Muerte. This was the seventh and final match in a Best of Seven Series.
March 5	House of Black (Malakai Black, Brody King, and Buddy Matthews)	Revolution	
August 27	Billy Gunn and The Acclaimed (Anthony Bowens and Max Caster)	All In	No Holds Barred match.

AEW TNT Championship
Incoming champion – Samoa Joe
Date	Winner	Event/Show	Note(s)
January 4	Darby Allin	Dynamite	
February 1	Samoa Joe	Dynamite	No Holds Barred match.
March 5	Wardlow	Revolution	
March 8	Powerhouse Hobbs	Dynamite	Falls Count Anywhere match that Hobbs won by technical knockout.
April 19	Wardlow	Dynamite	
June 17	Luchasaurus	Collision	
September 23	Christian Cage	Collision	Three-way match also involving Darby Allin.
December 30	Adam Copeland	Worlds End	No Disqualification match.
December 30	Christian Cage	Worlds End	Cage invoked his Patriarch member Killswitch's title shot that he won on the Zero Hour pre-show.

AEW TBS Championship
Incoming champion – Jade Cargill
Date	Winner	Event/Show	Note(s)
May 28	Kris Statlander	Double or Nothing	
November 18	Julia Hart	Full Gear	Three-way match that also involved Skye Blue, who she pinned.

AEW Continental Championship
(Title created)
Date	Winner	Event/Show	Note(s)
December 30	Eddie Kingston	Worlds End	Defeated Jon Moxley in the final of the inaugural Continental Classic to become the inaugural champion. Kingston's ROH World Championship and NJPW Strong Openweight Championship were also on the line, thus making Kingston the Triple Crown Champion.

FTW Championship
Incoming champion – Hook
Title not officially sanctioned by AEW.
Date	Winner	Event/Show	Note(s)
July 19	Jack Perry	Dynamite: Blood & Guts	
August 27	Hook	All In; Zero Hour	FTW Rules match.

=== AJPW ===
Triple Crown Heavyweight Championship
Incoming champion – Kento Miyahara
Date	Winner	Event/Show	Note(s)
February 19	Yuji Nagata	Excite Series 2023; Night 2: Pro-Wrestling Day MANIAx	
July 2	Yuma Aoyagi	Dynamite Series 2023; Night 5	
November 5	Katsuhiko Nakajima	Giant Series 2023; Night 6	

World Tag Team Championship
Incoming champions – Voodoo Murders (Kono and Suwama)
Date	Winner	Event/Show	Note(s)
January 2	Miyaken to Takuya (Kento Miyahara and Takuya Nomura): 1. AJPW New Year Giant Series 2023 Night 1		
January 22	Naoya Nomura and Yuma Aoyagi: 1. AJPW New Year Giant Series 2023 Night 5		
March 21	Kongo (Kenoh and Manabu Soya)	Dream Power Series; Night 3	
June 15	Zennichi Shin Jidai (Kento Miyahara and Yuma Aoyagi)	Dynamite Power Series	
October 9	Voodoo Murders (Jun Saito and Rei Saito)	Raising an Army Memorial Series; Night 2	

World Junior Heavyweight Championship
Incoming champion – Atsuki Aoyagi
Date	Winner	Event/Show	Note(s)
February 19	Naruki Doi	Excite Series 2023; Night 2: Pro-Wrestling Day MANIAx	
February 19	Atsuki Aoyagi	AJPW 50th Anniversary	
July 2	El Lindaman	Dynamite Series 2023; Night 5	
December 31	Dan Tamura	Mania X 2023	

All Asia Tag Team Championship
Incoming champions – Masao Inoue and Takao Omori
Date	Winner	Event/Show	Note(s)
January 3	Kendo Kashin and Nosawa Rongai: 1. AJPW New Year Giant Series 2023 Night 2		
February 4	Atsushi Onita and Yoshitatsu	Excite Series 2023; Night 1: Excite MANIAx	Tornado Bunkhouse Current Blast Deathmatch.
September 18	Burning (Jun Akiyama and Kotaro Suzuki)	DDT Dramatic Explosion 2023	Current Blast Bat And Board Death Match.
November 3	Eruption (Hideki Okatani and Yukio Sakaguchi)	DDT Road To Ultimate Party 2023 in Shinjuku	Promoted by DDT Pro-Wrestling.

Gaora TV Championship
Incoming champion – Toshizo
Date	Winner	Event/Show	Note(s)
January 22	Minoru Tanaka	#AJPW New Year Giant Series 2023; Night 5	

AJPW TV Six-Man Tag Team Championship
Incoming champions – Vacant
Date	Winner	Event/Show	Note(s)
March 14	Takao Omori, Black Menso-re, and ATM	Dream Power Series; Night 1	Defeated Black Tiger and Gungnir of Anarchy (Yusuke Kodama and Masao Hanahata) to win the vacant titles.
August 27	Eruption (Hideki Okatani, Yukio Sakaguchi, and Saki Akai)	Royal Road Tournament; Night 4	Title vs. title match where Eruption's KO-D 6-Man Tag Team Championship was also on the line.
October 21	Suwama, Mayumi Ozaki and Maya Yukihi	Raising an Army Memorial Tour; Night 4	

=== BJW ===
BJW Deathmatch Heavyweight Championship
Incoming champion – Hideyoshi Kamitani
Date	Winner	Event/Show	Note(s)
May 4	Abdullah Kobayashi	Endless Survivor ~ Infinity Independent	Yokohama Explosion Jungle Deathmatch.
July 16 (aired July 22)	Yuki Ishikawa	BJW	Deathmatch.
December 30	Mad Man Pondo	BJW	Fluorescent Lighttubes and Illinois Street Fight Deathmatch.

BJW World Strong Heavyweight Championship
Incoming champion – Yuji Okabayashi
Date	Winner	Event/Show	Note(s)
May 4	Yuya Aoki	Endless Survivor ~ Infinity Independent	

BJW Tag Team Championship
Incoming champions – Astronauts (Fuminori Abe and Takuya Nomura)
Date	Winner	Event/Show	Note(s)
December 30	Crazy Lovers (Masashi Takeda and Takumi Tsukamoto)	BJW	

BJW Junior Heavyweight Championship
Incoming champion – Kota Sekifuda
Date	Winner	Event/Show	Note(s)
May 4	Tomato Kaji	Endless Survivor ~ Infinity Independent	
December 30	Ender Kara	BJW	

Yokohama Shopping Street 6-Man Tag Team Championship
Incoming champions – Chicharito Shoki, Yasufumi Nakanoue, and Yuji Okabayashi
Date	Winner	Event/Show	Note(s)
March 12	Abdullah Kobayashi, Kankuro Hoshino, and Daiju Wakamatsu	2AW / BJW Big Advance	
June 29	Hideyoshi Kamitani, Yuki Ishikawa, and Kazumi Kikuta	BJW	
October 8	Daichi Hashimoto, Yasufumi Nakanoue, and Kazumasa Yoshida	Shopping Street Wrestling 2023 Series ~ New Chapter Begins Round 6	
October 14	Project Havoc (Leyton Buzzard, Tempesta, and Tyson Maddux)	Shopping Street Wrestling 2023 Series ~ New Chapter Begins Round 7	
October 28	Kazumi Kikuta, Yasufumi Nakanoue, and Yuya Aoki	Hatagaya Rokugo Street Shopping Pro-Wrestling	

UWA World Tag Team Championship
Incoming champions – Hub and Eisa8
Date	Winner	Event/Show	Note(s)
February 11	Kohei Kinoshita and Yasshi	BJW Osaka Surprise 64 ~ Glory Members 2023	
December 24	Speed of Sounds (Tsutomu Oosugi and Hercules Senga)	BJW Osaka Surprise 70 ~ Big Thanksgiving 2023	

=== CF ===
– DDT Pro-Wrestling
– Pro Wrestling Noah
– Tokyo Joshi Pro-Wrestling
– Ganbare Pro-Wrestling

==== DDT ====
KO-D Openweight Championship
Incoming champion – Kazusada Higuchi
Date	Winner	Event/Show	Note(s)
January 29	Yuji Hino	Sweet Dreams!	
July 23	Chris Brookes	Wrestle Peter Pan	
November 12	Yuki Ueno	Ultimate Party	

DDT Universal Championship
Incoming champion – Yuki Ueno
Date	Winner	Event/Show	Note(s)
January 13	Naruki Doi	Sweet Dreams! 2023 Tour in Shinjuku: Fire!	Three-way elimination match also involving Daisuke Sasaki.
March 21	Tetsuya Endo	Judgement	
July 23	Matt Cardona	Wrestle Peter Pan	
November 12	Mao	Ultimate Party	No Disqualification match.

DDT Extreme Championship
Incoming champion – Jun Akiyama
Date	Winner	Event/Show	Note(s)
May 3	Shunma Katsumata	Mega Max Bump	Toys, ladders, and chairs match.
May 22	Vacated	—	Katsumata vacated the title after suffering a broken foot.
June 25	Kazuki Hirata	What Are You Doing	Defeated Mao and Yoshihiko in a three-way elimination match to win the vacant title.

KO-D Tag Team Championship
Incoming champions – Vacant
Date	Winner	Event/Show	Note(s)
January 3	ShunMao (Mao and Shunma Katsumata)	Hatsuyume	Defeated Calamari Drunken Kings (Chris Brookes and Masahiro Takanashi) to win the vacant titles.
May 22	Vacated	—	Vacated after Katsumata had suffered a broken foot.
June 25	Damnation T.A. (Daisuke Sasaki and MJ Paul)	What Are You Doing	Defeated The37Kamiina (Yuki Ueno and Toy Kojima) to win the vacant titles.
August 13	Ω (Makoto Oishi and Yuji Hino)	Saki Akai 10th Anniversary Show	
September 9	Damnation T.A. (Minoru Fujita and Kanon)	Big Bang	
October 4	Romance Dawn (Soma Takao and Shota)	God Bless DDT 2023 Tour in Shinjuku	

KO-D 6-Man Tag Team Championship
Incoming champions – Burning (Tetsuya Endo, Kotaro Suzuki, and Yusuke Okada)
Date	Winner	Event/Show	Note(s)
February 26	Shinya Aoki, Yuki Ueno, and Super Sasadango Machine	Into The Fight	
May 14 (aired May 17)	Harimao (Kazusada Higuchi, Ryota Nakatsu, and Yuki Ishida)	DDT x Only We Yuji Hino 20th Anniversary Event	
July 23	Eruption (Hideki Okatani, Yukio Sakaguchi, and Saki Akai)	Wrestle Peter Pan	
November 12	Vacated	Ultimate Party	Vacated after Akai retired from professional wrestling.
November 16	D・O・A (Jun Akiyama, Danshoku Dino and Makoto Oishi)	Get Alive 2023 Tour in Shinjuku	Defeated The37Kamiina (Yuki Ueno, Mao and Toy Kojima) in the final of a four-team tournament to win the vacant title.

KO-D 10-Man Tag Team Championship
Incoming champions – The37Kamiina (Mao, Shinya Aoki, Shunma Katsumata, Toi Kojima, and Yuki Ueno)
No title changes.

O-40 Championship
Incoming champion – Vacant
Date	Winner	Event/Show	Note(s)
March 21	Makoto Oishi	Judgement	Defeated Gorgeous Matsuno and Shinichiro Kawamatsu in a three-way match to win the vacant title.

World Ōmori Championship
Incoming champion – Soma Takao
No title changes.

Ironman Heavymetalweight Championship
Incoming champion – Saki Akai
Date	Winner	Event/Show	Note(s)
February 18	Penelope Ford	Friendship, Endeavour, Victory	
February 26	Kip Sabian	Into The Fight	
February 26	Yoshihiko	Into The Fight	
March 4	Kazuki Hirata	Yokohama Unlimited Vol. 2	Took place during a 10-person rumble rules battle royal.
March 4	Akito	Yokohama Unlimited Vol. 2	Took place during a 10-person rumble rules battle royal.
March 24	Yusuke Okada	Dramatic Dream Tour 2023	
March 24	Akito	Dramatic Dream Tour 2023	
March 24	Yoshihiko	Dramatic Dream Tour 2023	
March 30	Mao	DDT Goes Hollywood	Took place during a tag team match when Mao and Shunma Katsumata defeated Yoshihiko and Chris Brookes. Mao pinned Yoshihiko to win the title.
March 30	Chris Brookes	DDT Goes Hollywood	Took place after the match.
March 30	Yoshihiko	DDT Goes Hollywood	Took place after the match.
March 31	Cole Radrick	DDT vs. GCW	
March 31	Yoshihiko	DDT vs. GCW	
June 16 (aired June 19)	Sanshiro Takagi	What Are You Doing Tour in Hakodate	
August 13	Naruki Doi	Saki Akai 10th Anniversary Show	Last eliminated Akito in a battle royal to win the title.
September 9	Kazuki Hirata	Big Bang	All Humans Are Equal! Kazuki Hirata Death Match. Hirata's DDT Extreme Championship was also on the line.
September 30 (aired October 3)	Mao	Saki Akai 10th Anniversary & Final Countdown in Kyoto	Tag team match where Mao and Yuki Ueno defeated Hirata and Akito; Mao pinned Hirata to win the title.
September 30 (aired October 3)	Saki Akai	Saki Akai 10th Anniversary & Final Countdown in Kyoto	
September 30 (aired October 3)	Kazuki Hirata	Saki Akai 10th Anniversary & Final Countdown in Kyoto	
October 4	Takeshi Masada	God Bless DDT 2023 Tour in Shinjuku	Tag team match in which Masada was teaming with Kazuma Sumi while Hirata was teaming with Makoto Oishi. Masada pinned Hirata to win the title.
October 15	Mao	God Bless DDT 2023 Tour in Sapporo; Night 2	
October 15	Takeshi Masada	God Bless DDT 2023 Tour in Sapporo; Night 2	
October 22	Kazuki Hirata	God Bless DDT 2023 Tour in Tokyo	
October 22	Hiromu Takahashi	God Bless DDT 2023 Tour in Tokyo	
October 29	Yellow iPhone 14	N/A	
October 29	Sumie Sakai	N/A	
October 29	Hiromu Takahashi	N/A	
November 2	Taiji Ishimori	NJPW Road to Power Struggle	Promoted by New Japan Pro-Wrestling.
November 4	Hiromu Takahashi	NJPW Power Struggle	Promoted by New Japan Pro-Wrestling. Takahashi's IWGP Junior Heavyweight Championship was also on the line.
November 12	IWGP Junior Heavyweight Championship belt	Ultimate Party	Pinned Takahashi while the latter was lying down in the ring.
November 12	Kazuki Hirata	Ultimate Party	
November 16	Mikami	Get Alive 2023 Tour in Shinjuku	Pinned Hirata during a Trivia King Deathmatch for the latter's DDT Extreme Championship.
November 16	Kazuki Hirata	Get Alive 2023 Tour in Shinjuku	
November 19	Yuki Ueno	Get Alive 2023 in Osaka	Ueno pinned Hirata in a six-man tag team match to win the title. Ueno teamed with Chris Brookes and Kazusada Higuchi against Mikami, Tetsuya Endo, and Yukio Naya.
November 19	Mao	Get Alive 2023 in Osaka	
November 19	Great Koji	Get Alive 2023 in Osaka	
December 24	Poison Sawada Julie	D-Oh Grand Prix in Korokuen Hall	Took place during a battle royal.
December 24	Toru Owashi	D-Oh Grand Prix in Korokuen Hall	Took place during a battle royal.
December 24	Christmas tree	D-Oh Grand Prix in Korokuen Hall	Kazuki Hirata attacked Owashi with a Christmas tree and pinned him, but the referee ruled that the Christmas tree had pinned Owashi and awarded it the championship.

==== Noah ====
GHC Heavyweight Championship
Incoming champion – Kaito Kiyomiya
Date	Winner	Event/Show	Note(s)
March 19	Jake Lee	Great Voyage in Yokohama	
October 28	Kenoh	Demolition Stage in Fukuoka	

GHC Junior Heavyweight Championship
Incoming champion – Amakusa
Date	Winner	Event/Show	Note(s)
April 16	Hayata	Green Journey in Sendai	
October 4 (aired November 7)	Daga	Demolition Stage in Niigata	

GHC National Championship
Incoming champion – El Hijo de Dr. Wagner Jr.
Date	Winner	Event/Show	Note(s)
October 28	Jack Morris	Demolition Stage in Fukuoka	

GHC Tag Team Championship
Incoming champions – TakaKoji (Satoshi Kojima and Takashi Sugiura)
Date	Winner	Event/Show	Note(s)
February 12	Daiki Inaba and Masa Kitamiya	Great Voyage in Osaka	
April 16	Takashi Sugiura and Shuhei Taniguchi	Green Journey in Sendai	
May 4	Real (Timothy Thatcher and Saxon Huxley)	Majestic	
September 24	Good Looking Guys (Jack Morris and Anthony Greene)	Grand Ship in Nagoya	

GHC Junior Heavyweight Tag Team Championship
Incoming champions – Yo-Hey and Kzy
Date	Winner	Event/Show	Note(s)
January 1	Yoshinari Ogawa and Eita	The New Year	
April 16	Good Looking Guys (Tadasuke and Yo-Hey)	Green Journey in Sendai	
June 22	Stinger (Chris Ridgeway and Daga)	Star Navigation; Night 5	
September 11	Vacated	—	
September 24	Los Golpeadores (Dragon Bane and Alpha Wolf)	Grand Ship in Nagoya	Defeated Ninja Mack and Alejandro for the vacant titles.

GHC Openweight Hardcore Championship
Incoming champion – (Title reactivated with a new lineage)
Date	Winner	Event/Show	Note(s)
October 23	Masato Tanaka	Monday Magic 2	Defeated Ninja Mack to win the vacant title. The title had been inactive since 2009.
November 27	Ninja Mack	Monday Magic 4	Defeated Masato Tanaka and Super Crazy in a three-way hardcore match.

==== TJPW ====
Princess of Princess Championship
Incoming champion – Yuka Sakazaki
Date	Winner	Event/Show	Note(s)
March 18	Mizuki	Grand Princess '23	
October 9	Miyu Yamashita	Wrestle Princess IV	

Princess Tag Team Championship
Incoming champions – Reiwa Ban AA Cannon (Saki Akai and Yuki Arai)
Date	Winner	Event/Show	Note(s)
January 4	Wasteland War Party (Heidi Howitzer and Max the Impaler)	Tokyo Joshi Pro '23	
March 18	121000000 (Maki Itoh and Miyu Yamashita)	Grand Princess '23	
March 31	Magical Sugar Rabbits (Mizuki and Yuka Sakazaki)	TJPW Live in Los Angeles	
June 9	Vacated	—	Vacated after Sakazaki suffered a neck injury.
October 9	Free WiFi (Hikari Noa and Nao Kakuta)	Wrestle Princess IV	Defeated Toyo Mates (Yuki Kamifuku and Mahiro Kiryu) to win the vacant titles.
December 31	Vacated	—	Vacated after Kakuta was sidelined with injury.

International Princess Championship
Incoming champion – Miu Watanabe
Date	Winner	Event/Show	Note(s)
March 18	Rika Tatsumi	Grand Princess '23	
October 9	Max the Impaler	Wrestle Princess IV	Winner Takes All match also for Max's NWA World Women's Television Championship.

==== GanPro ====
Spirit of Ganbare World Openweight Championship
Incoming champion - Mizuki Watase
Date	Winner	Event/Show	Note(s)
July 9	Isami Kodaka	Wrestle Sekihagara 2	
December 27	Shuichiro Katsumura	Bad Communication	

Spirit of Ganbare World Tag Team Championship
(Title created)
Date	Winner	Event/Show	Note(s)
May 5	Hentai Punch Drunkers (Hikaru Sato and Tyson Maeguchi)	Love Phantom	Defeated Uruseez (Tatsuhito Takaiwa and Yumehito Imanari) in a tournament final to become the inaugural champions.
July 9	GrandAbsolute (Shuichiro Katsumura and Takuya Wada)	Wrestle Sekihagara 2	

=== CMLL ===
CMLL World Heavyweight Championship
Incoming champion – Gran Guerrero
No title changes.

CMLL World Light Heavyweight Championship
Incoming champion – El Bárbaro Cavernario
No title changes.

CMLL World Middleweight Championship
Incoming champion – Dragón Rojo Jr.
Date	Winner	Event/Show	Note(s)
May 12	Templario	Super Viernes	

CMLL World Welterweight Championship
Incoming champion – Titán
No title changes.

CMLL World Lightweight Championship
Incoming champion – Stigma
No title changes.

CMLL World Mini-Estrella Championship
Incoming champion – Mercurio
No title changes.

CMLL World Micro-Estrellas Championship
Incoming champion – Micro Gemelo Diablo I
No title changes.

CMLL World Tag Team Championship
Incoming champions – Los Nuevos Ingobernables (Ángel de Oro and Niebla Roja)
No title changes.

CMLL Arena Coliseo Tag Team Championship
Incoming champions – Hombre Bala Jr. and Robin
Date	Winner	Event/Show	Note(s)
March 14	Furia Rojo and Guerrero de la Noche	Martes de Glamour	Title vs. title match where Rojo and de la Noche's Occidente Tag Team Championship was also on the line.
October 7	La Ola Negra (Akuma and Espanto Jr.)	Martes de Glamour	

CMLL World Trios Championship
Incoming champions – Los Infernales (Euforia, Mephisto, and Hechicero)
Date	Winner	Event/Show	Note(s)
June 2	Atlantis Jr., Volador Jr., and Star Jr.	Viernes Espactacular	

CMLL World Women's Championship
Incoming champion – Princesa Sugehit
Date	Winner	Event/Show	Note(s)
August 16	Vacated	—	Vacated after Princesa Sugehit sustained an injury.
September 29	Stephanie Vaquer	Noche de Campeones	Defeated La Catalina to win the vacant title.

CMLL Japan Women's Championship
Incoming champion – Dalys la Caribeña
Date	Winner	Event/Show	Note(s)
September 8	Vacated	—	Vacated after Dalys la Caribeña signed with Lucha Libre AAA Worldwide.
September 17	Dark Silueta	CMLL Lady's Ring	Defeated Kohaku to win the vacant title.

CMLL World Women's Tag Team Championship
(Title created)
Date	Winner	Event/Show	Note(s)
September 16	Stephanie Vaquer and Zeuxis	CMLL 90th Anniversary Show	Defeated Las Chicas Indomables (La Jarochita and Lluvia) to become the inaugural champions.

CMLL Barroco Championship
(Title created)
Date	Winner	Event/Show	Note(s)
July 17	Perverso	Arena Puebla 70. Aniversario	Defeated Rey Samuray to become the inaugural champion.

NWA World Historic Light Heavyweight Championship
Incoming champion – Stuka Jr.
Date	Winner	Event/Show	Note(s)
February 4	Atlantis Jr.	Sabados de Coliseo	

NWA World Historic Middleweight Championship
Incoming champion – Místico
No title changes.

NWA World Historic Welterweight Championship
Incoming champion – Volador Jr.
Date	Winner	Event/Show	Note(s)
January 20	Rocky Romero	Super Viernes	
December 15	Máscara Dorada	Super Viernes	

Mexican National Heavyweight Championship
Incoming champion – El Sagrado
Date	Winner	Event/Show	Note(s)
June 6	Star Black	Martes de Arena Mexico	

Mexican National Light Heavyweight Championship
Incoming champion – Ángel de Oro
Date	Winner	Event/Show	Note(s)
May 23	Esfinge	Martes de Arena Mexico	

Mexican National Middleweight Championship
Incoming champion – Templario
Date	Winner	Event/Show	Note(s)
May 17	Vacated	—	Vacated after Templario won the CMLL World Middleweight Championship.
June 2	Guerrero Maya Jr.	Viernes Espectacular	Defeated Rugido in a tournament final to win the vacant title.

Mexican National Lightweight Championship
Incoming champion – Panterita del Ring Jr.
Date	Winner	Event/Show	Note(s)
May 24	Vacated	—	Vacated after Panterita moved up a weight class.
July 30	Futuro	Domingos Arena Mexico	Gallo Jr, Max Star, Meyer, Brillante Jr., Rafaga Jr., Raya Metalico, and Misterio Blanco in a tournament final to win the vacant title.

Mexican National Tag Team Championship
Incoming champions – La Fuerza Tapatia (Esfinge and Fugaz)
Date	Winner	Event/Show	Note(s)
July 9	Los Depredadores (Magnus and Rugido)	Domingos Arena Mexico	

Mexican National Trios Championship
Incoming champions – Los Dulces Atrapasueños (Dulce Gardenia, Espíritu Negro, and Rey Cometa)
Date	Winner	Event/Show	Note(s)
September 29	Los Indestructibles (Apocalipsis, Cholo, and Disturbio)	Noche de Campeones	

Mexican National Women's Championship
Incoming champion – Dark Silueta
Date	Winner	Event/Show	Note(s)
June 14	Vacated	—	Vacated after Dark Silueta suffered an injury, and because she wanted to tour Japan upon her return.
July 14	Reyna Isis	Super Viernes	Defeated Lluvia to win the vacant title.

Mexican National Women's Tag Team Championship
Incoming champions – Las Chicas Indomables (La Jarochita and Lluvia)
No title changes.

Occidente Heavyweight Championship
Incoming champion – Bestia Negra
No title changes.

Occidente Middleweight Championship
Incoming champion – Zandokan Jr.
No title changes.

Occidente Tag Team Championship
Incoming champions – Furia Roja and Guerrero de la Noche
No title changes.

Occidente Trios Championship
Incoming champions – Los Magnificos (Adrenalina, Explosivo, and Fantastico)
Date	Winner	Event/Show	Note(s)
December 29	Batallon de la Muerte (Rey Apocalipsis, El Malayo, and Siki Ozama Jr.)	Viernes de Locura	

Occidente Women's Tag Team Championship
(Title created)
Date	Winner	Event/Show	Note(s)
March 21	Stephanie Vaquer and Zeuxis	Martes de Glamour	Defeated Las Chicas Indomables (La Jarochita and Lluvia) in a tournament final to become the inaugural champions.
September 16	Vacated	—	Vacated after Stephanie Vaquer and Zeuxis won the CMLL World Women's Tag Team Championship.

=== The Crash ===
The Crash Heavyweight Championship
Incoming champion – L. A. Park
Date	Winner	Event/Show	Note(s)
May 5	Vacated	The Crash	
May 5	DMT Azul	The Crash	Defeated Blue Demon Jr., Matt Taven, and EC3 to win the vacant title.

The Crash Cruiserweight Championship
Incoming champion – Black Destiny
No title changes.

The Crash Junior Championship
Incoming champion – Proximo
Date	Winner	Event/Show	Note(s)
March 24	Anubis	The Crash	Three-way match also involving Aster Boy.
November 3	Gallo Extreme	The Crash 12th Anniversary Show	Ladder match also involving Noisy Boy, Rey Furia, and El Rey.

The Crash Women's Championship
Incoming champion – Sexy Star II
Date	Winner	Event/Show	Note(s)
May 5	Vacated	The Crash	
May 5	Dulce Tormenta	The Crash	Defeated Jessie Jackson to win the vacant title.
November 3	Julissa	The Crash 12th Anniversary Show	Five-way match also involving Keyra, Trish Adora, and Zamaya.

The Crash Tag Team Championship
Incoming champion – Vacant
Date	Winner	Event/Show	Note(s)
March 24	Los Golpeadores (Alpha Wolf and Dragon Bane)	The Crash	Defeated Arkangel Divino and Último Maldito to win the vacant titles. This match was also for the vacant KAOZ Tag Team Championship.

=== CZW ===
CZW World Heavyweight Championship
Incoming champion – Vacant
Date	Winner	Event/Show	Note(s)
May 10	Rich Swann	Best of the Best 19	Defeated Fred Yehi in the final of the Best of the Best tournament to win the vacant title.

CZW World Tag Team Championship
Incoming champion – Vacant
Date	Winner	Event/Show	Note(s)
March 5	CMD (Boom Harden and Desean Pratt)	Limelight 14	Defeated Milk Chocolate (Brandon Watts & Randy Summers), Post Game (Mike Walker & Vinny Talotta), and The REP (Dave McCall & Nate Carter) in a ladder match to win the vacant titles.
September 3	Milk Chocolate (Brandon Watts & Randy Summers)	Limelight 20	

=== DG ===
Open the Dream Gate Championship
Incoming champion – Yuki Yoshioka
Date	Winner	Event/Show	Note(s)
January 12	Shun Skywalker	Open the New Year Gate; Night 5	
May 5	Madoka Kikuta	Dead or Alive	
December 24	Luis Mante	Final Gate	Three-way elimination match also involving Shun Skywalker.

Open the Brave Gate Championship
Incoming champion – Minorita
Date	Winner	Event/Show	Note(s)
March 4	Jason Lee	Champion Gate in Osaka; Night 1	
July 2	Ishin	Kobe Pro-Wrestling Festival	
October 9	Kzy	Gate of Origin	
October 14	Ishin	Gate of Victory; Night 6	
December 5	H.Y.O	Fantastic Gate; Night 4	

Open the Twin Gate Championship
Incoming champions – Natural Vibes (Big Boss Shimizu and Kzy)
Date	Winner	Event/Show	Note(s)
April 4	Kongo (Kenoh and Shuji Kondo)	DG / Masaaki Mochizuki Producde Buyuden Rei ~ Zero ~	
June 2	M3K (Susumu Mochizuki and Yasushi Kanda)	Rainbow Gate; Night 2	
November 5	D'courage (Dragon Dia and Yuki Yoshioka)	Gate of Destiny	
December 19	Vacated	—	
December 24	Alejandro and Kaito Kiyomiya	Final Gate	Defeated Gold Class (Ben-K and Kota Minoura) to win the vacant titles.

Open the Triangle Gate Championship
Incoming champions – Z-Brats (Ishin Iihashi/Ishin, Kai, and Shun Skywalker)
Date	Winner	Event/Show	Note(s)
January 22	Gold Class (Ben-K, BxB Hulk, and Kota Minoura)	Open the New Year Gate; Night 9	
May 20	Natural Vibes (Big Boss Shimizu, Kzy, and Jacky "Funky" Kamei)	Hopeful Gate; Night 10 ~ BxB Hulk & Kzy Homecoming	
July 2	Gold Class (Kota Minoura, Naruki Doi, and Minorita)	Kobe Pro-Wrestling Festival	
August 26	Vacated	—	
October 6	Dragon Kid, Punch Tominaga and Yamato	Gate of Victory; Night 3	Defeated Gold Class (Ben-K, Kota Minoura, and Naruki Doi) and D'courage (Dragon Dia, Madoka Kikuta, and Yuki Yoshioka) in a three-way elimination tournament final to win the vacant titles.
December 24	Z-Brats (Ishin, Kai, and Yoshiki Kato)	Final Gate	

Open the Owarai Gate Championship
(Title reactivated)
Date	Winner	Event/Show	Note(s)
July 8	Kikutaro	DG/Masaaki Mochizuki Produce Buyuden Rei ~ Zero ~ Vol. 2	Defeated Konomama Ichikawa to win the vacant title. The title had been inactive since 2018.
October 5	Lingerie Muto	DG/Masaaki Mochizuki Produce Buyuden Rei ~ Zero ~ Vol. 3	The match ended in a double knockout. Muto won the title via a fan vote.

=== GCW ===
GCW World Championship
Incoming champion - Nick Gage
Date	Winner	Event/Show	Note(s)
March 17	Masha Slamovich	Eye for an Eye	
June 4	Blake Christian	Cage of Survival 2	This was Christian's Brass Ring championship match; Cage of Survival match also involving Rina Yamashita.

GCW Extreme Championship
Incoming champion - Joey Janela
No title changes.

GCW Ultraviolent Championship
Incoming champion - Rina Yamashita
No title changes.

GCW Tag Team Championship
Incoming champions - Los Macizos (Ciclope and Miedo Extremo)
Date	Winner	Event/Show	Note(s)
March 5	The Motor City Machine Guns (Alex Shelley and Chris Sabin)	Ransom	
March 31	The East West Express (Jordan Oliver and Nick Wayne)	Joey Janela's Spring Break 7	
August 20	Takashi Sasaki and Toru Sugiura	Homecoming Weekend; Night 2	
October 12	Los Macizos (Ciclope and Miedo Extremo)	The Wrld of GCW	
November 4	Violence is Forever (Dominic Garrini and Kevin Ku)	Si or No?	

JCW World Championship
(Title reactivated)
Date	Winner	Event/Show	Note(s)
February 11	Jordan Oliver	JCW Jersey J-Cup	Defeated Mike Bailey in the final of the Jersey J-Cup to win the title. The title had been inactive since 2004.

=== Gleat ===
G-Rex Championship
Incoming champion - El Lindaman
Date	Winner	Event/Show	Note(s)
January 8 (aired January 12)	Kaito Ishida	Gleat Ver. 5	
April 12	T-Hawk	G Prowrestling Ver. 49 ~ Invader	
December 30	Hayato Tamura	Gleat Ver. 7	

G-Infinity Championship
Incoming champions - Bulk Orchestra (Check Shimatani and Hayato Tamura)
Date	Winner	Event/Show	Note(s)
June 7	Voodoo Murders (Jun Saito and Rei Saito)	Gleat ver. EX Face-Off ~ Access 2 TDCH	

Lidet UWF Championship
(Title created)
Date	Winner	Event/Show	Note(s)
June 7	Takanori Ito	Gleat ver. EX Face-Off ~ Access 2 TDCH	Defeated Shinya Aoki in a tournament final to become the inaugural champion.
July 1	Fujita Hayato	Gleat ver. 6 ~ 2nd Anniversary	

=== Ice Ribbon ===
ICE×∞ Championship
Incoming champion - Saori Anou
Date	Winner	Event/Show	Note(s)
March 19	Satsuki Totoro	New Ice Ribbon 1276 ~ Ice Ribbon March	
July 19	YuuRI	New Ice Ribbon 1289 ~ Yokohama Ribbon July	
August 26	Ibuki Hoshi	New Ice Ribbon 1297 ~ Ice in Wonderland	

FantastICE Championship
Incoming champion - Akane Fujita
No title changes.

International Ribbon Tag Team Championship
Incoming champions - Hikaru Shida and Ibuki Hoshi
Date	Winner	Event/Show	Note(s)
March 19	Mukomako; Makoto and Hamuko Hoshi)	New Ice Ribbon 1267	
August 26	Misa Kagura and Sumika Yanagawa	New Ice Ribbon 1297 ~ Ice in Ribbon	
October 22	Vacated	New Ice Ribbon 1309 in 176BOX	
November 3	Queen Valkyrie (Ancham and YuuRI)	New Ice Ribbon 1311 in Tokyo Dome City	Defeated Ibuki Hoshi and Kaho Matsushita to win the vacant titles.
December 30	Kyuri and Mifu Ashida	New Ice Ribbon #1320 ~ RibbonMania	

Triangle Ribbon Championship
Incoming champions - Vacant
No title changes.

=== Impact ===
Impact World Championship
Incoming champion – Josh Alexander
Date	Winner	Event/Show	Note(s)
March 24 (aired April 6)	Vacated	Impact!	Alexander relinquished the title due to a torn triceps.
April 16	Steve Maclin	Rebellion	Defeated Kushida to win the vacant title.
June 9	Alex Shelley	Against All Odds	

Impact X Division Championship
Incoming champion – Trey Miguel
Date	Winner	Event/Show	Note(s)
June 9	Chris Sabin	Against All Odds	
July 15	Lio Rush	Slammiversary	
September 9 (aired September 14)	Chris Sabin	Impact! 1000; Week 1	

Impact Knockouts World Championship
Incoming champion – Jordynne Grace
Date	Winner	Event/Show	Note(s)
January 13	Mickie James	Hard To Kill	Title vs. Career match.
March 25 (aired April 13)	Vacated	Impact!	James relinquished the title due to a broken rib.
April 16	Deonna Purrazzo	Rebellion	Defeated Jordynne Grace to win the vacant title.
July 15	Trinity	Slammiversary	

Impact World Tag Team Championship
Incoming champions – The Motor City Machine Guns (Alex Shelley and Chris Sabin)
Date	Winner	Event/Show	Note(s)
February 25 (aired March 2)	ABC (Ace Austin and Chris Bey)	Impact!	
July 15	Subculture (Mark Andrews and Flash Morgan Webster)	Slammiversary	Four-way tag team match also involving Brian Myers and Moose, and Rich Swann and Sami Callihan.
August 27	The Rascalz (Trey Miguel and Zachary Wentz)	Emergence	
October 21	ABC (Ace Austin and Chris Bey)	Bound for Glory	This was Bey's Feast or Fired match.

Impact Knockouts World Tag Team Championship
Incoming champions – The Death Dollz (Rosemary, Taya Valkyrie, and Jessicka)
Date	Winner	Event/Show	Note(s)
February 26 (aired March 16)	The Coven (Taylor Wilde and KiLynn King)	Impact!	Defeated Rosemary and Valkyrie who represented The Death Dollz.
July 15	MK Ultra (Killer Kelly and Masha Slamovich)	Slammiversary	

Impact Digital Media Championship
Incoming champion – Joe Hendry
Date	Winner	Event/Show	Note(s)
July 15	Kenny King	Slammiversary; Pre-Show	
September 9	Tommy Dreamer	Victory Road	Title vs. Career match.

=== IWRG ===
IWRG Intercontinental Heavyweight Championship
Incoming champion – Galeno del Mal
Date	Winner	Event/Show	Note(s)
November 2	DMT Azul	Castillo del Terror	Five-way elimination match also involving El Hijo del Pirata Morgan, Ivan Rakov, and Vito Fratelli.

IWRG Intercontinental Middleweight Championship
Incoming champion – Puma de Oro
Date	Winner	Event/Show	Note(s)
October 26	Relámpago	Thursday Night Wrestling Revancha	

IWRG Intercontinental Welterweight Championship
Incoming champion – Tonalli
No title changes.

IWRG Intercontinental Lightweight Championship
Incoming champion – Spider Fly
Date	Winner	Event/Show	Note(s)
October 29	Aguila Roja	IWRG	

IWRG Intercontinental Women's Championship
Incoming champions – Diosa Quetzal
Date	Winner	Event/Show	Note(s)
December 17	Keyra	Revolución 61	

IWRG Intercontinental Tag Team Championship
Incoming champions – El Hijo de Canis Lupus and Rey Léon
Date	Winner	Event/Show	Note(s)
June 4	Los Terribles Cerebros (Cerebro Negro and Cerebro Negro Jr.)	IWRG World Lucha Libre Championship	

IWRG Intercontinental Trios Championship
Incoming champions – Espartaco, Latino and Tempestad
Date	Winner	Event/Show	Note(s)
August 28	Poder del Norte (Mocho Cota Jr., Súper Comando, and Tito Santana)	Promociones Cantu	Promoted by Promociones Cantu.
December 17	La Pandemia (Gran Pandemonium, Hijo De Pandemonium, and Pandemonium Jr.)	IWRG	

IWRG Junior de Juniors Championship
Incoming champion – Dick Angelo 3G
Date	Winner	Event/Show	Note(s)
January 1	El Hijo de Fishman	Guerreros De Acero	

IWRG Rey del Ring Championship
Incoming champion – Hijo del Pirata Morgan
Date	Winner	Event/Show	Note(s)
May 14	El Hijo de Canis Lupus	IWRG	
September 17	Vito Fratelli	IWRG/RGR Lucha Libre Luchadores al Grito de Guerra	

IWRG Rey del Aire Championship
Incoming champion – Noisy Boy
Date	Winner	Event/Show	Note(s)
January 1	Puma de Oro	Guerreros de Acero	Five-Way Title vs. Hair Cage match also involving Aramis, El Hijo de Canis Lupus, and Hell Boy.
July 9	Noisy Boy	IWRG	

IWRG Mexico Championship
Incoming champion – Puma de Oro
Date	Winner	Event/Show	Note(s)
March 19	Shocko	Rebelión de los Juniors	
March 19	Hell Boy	Rebelión de los Juniors	

Distrito Federal Trios Championship
Incoming champions – El Infierno Eterno (Demonio Infernal, Eterno, and Lunatic Extreme)
No title changes.

IWRG World Lucha Libre Championship
Incoming champion – (Title created)
Date	Winner	Event/Show	Note(s)
June 4	Vito Fratelli	IWRG World Lucha Libre Championship	Defeated Hell Boy in a tournament final to become the inaugural champion.

=== MLW ===
MLW World Heavyweight Championship
Incoming champion – Alexander Hammerstone
Date	Winner	Event/Show	Note(s)
July 8	Alex Kane	Never Say Never	

MLW World Tag Team Championship
Incoming champions – Hustle & Power (Calvin Tankman and E. J. Nduka)
Date	Winner	Event/Show	Note(s)
January 7	The Samoan SWAT Team (Lance Anoaʻi and Juicy Finau)	Blood and Thunder	
July 8	The Calling (Akira and Rickey Shane Page)	Never Say Never	This was a Fans Bring the Weapons match.
November 18	The Second Gear Crew (1 Called Manders, Good Brother#3 and Matthew Justice)	Fightland	This was a ladder match. Justice and Manders won the titles, but Good Brother #3 was recognized as champion under the Freebird Rule.

MLW World Middleweight Championship
Incoming champion – Lince Dorado
Date	Winner	Event/Show	Note(s)
April 6	Akira	War Chamber	This was a three-way match also involving Lio Rush.
October 14	Rocky Romero	Slaughterhouse	This was a Winner Takes All match also for Romero's NWA World Historic Welterweight Championship.

MLW National Openweight Championship
Incoming champion – Davey Richards
Date	Winner	Event/Show	Note(s)
January 7	Johnny Fusion / John Hennigan	Blood and Thunder	Originally won the title as Johnny Fusion before going on to defend it under his real name John Hennigan.
April 6	Jacob Fatu	War Chamber	
September 3	Rickey Shane Page	Fury Road	This was a Weapons of Mass Destruction match.

MLW Caribbean Heavyweight Championship
Incoming champion – Octagón Jr.
Date	Winner	Event/Show	Note(s)
January 6	Vacated	—	Savio Vega stripped Octagón Jr. of the title for failing to defend it. After the vacancy was filled, the title was no longer associated with MLW.
January 6	Khris Diaz	Histeria Boricua	

MLW World Women's Featherweight Championship
Incoming champion – Taya Valkyrie
Date	Winner	Event/Show	Note(s)
April 6	Delmi Exo	War Chamber	
October 14	Janai Kai	Slaughterhouse	

=== M-Pro ===
Tohoku Junior Heavyweight Championship
Incoming champion – Fujita Hayato
No title changes.

Tohoku Tag Team Championship
Incoming champions – Kazuki Hashimoto and Musashi
Date	Winner	Event/Show	Note(s)
June 30 (aired July 8)	Kagetora and Yoshitsune	30th Anniversary 2023 Tokyo Convention Vol. 1 ~ Jiyu Kattatsu	

UWA World Tag Team Championship
Incoming champions – Eisa8 and Hub
Date	Winner	Event/Show	Note(s)
February 11	Kohei Kinoshita and Yasshi	BJW Osaka Surprise 64 ~ Glory Members	Promoted by Big Japan Pro-Wrestling.

=== NWA ===
NWA Worlds Heavyweight Championship
Incoming champion – Tyrus
Date	Winner	Event/Show	Note(s)
August 27	EC3	NWA 75; Night 2	Bullrope match. As a result of losing, Tyrus retired from in-ring competition.

NWA National Championship
Incoming champion – Cyon
Date	Winner	Event/Show	Note(s)
April 7	EC3	NWA 312	
July 9 (aired July 11)	Vacated	Powerrr	EC3 relinquished the title to challenge Tyrus for the NWA Worlds Heavyweight Championship at NWA 75.
August 26	"Thrillbilly" Silas Mason	NWA 75; Night 1	Defeated J. R. Kratos and Odinson in a three-way match to win the vacant title.

NWA World Television Championship
Incoming champion – Jordan Clearwater
Date	Winner	Event/Show	Note(s)
February 12 (aired February 14)	Thom Latimer	Powerrr	
August 28 (aired September 12)	Vacated	Powerrr	Latimer relinquished the title to challenge EC3 for the NWA Worlds Heavyweight Championship at Samhain as part of the "Lucky Seven Rule."
August 29 (aired October 10)	Mims	Powerrr	Defeated Zicky Dice to win the vacant title.

NWA World Junior Heavyweight Championship
Incoming champion – Kerry Morton
Date	Winner	Event/Show	Note(s)
August 26	Colby Corino	NWA 75; Night 1	

NWA World Women's Championship
Incoming champion – Kamille
Date	Winner	Event/Show	Note(s)
August 27	Kenzie Paige	NWA 75; Night 2	

NWA World Women's Television Championship
(Title created)
Date	Winner	Event/Show	Note(s)
April 7	Kenzie Paige	NWA 312	Defeated Max the Impaler in a tournament final to become the inaugural champion.
August 26	Max the Impaler	NWA 75; Night 1	

NWA World Tag Team Championship
Incoming champions – La Rebelión (Bestia 666 and Mecha Wolf 450)
Date	Winner	Event/Show	Note(s)
August 26	Blunt Force Trauma (Carnage and Damage)	NWA 75; Night 1	

NWA United States Tag Team Championship
Incoming champions – The Fixers (Jay Bradley and Wrecking Ball Legursky)
Date	Winner	Event/Show	Note(s)
January 31	The Country Gentlemen (AJ Cazana and Anthony Andrews)	Powerrr Live	
August 27	Daisy Kill and Talos	NWA 75; Night 2 Pre-Show	
October 28	The Immortals (J. R. Kratos and Odinson)	Samhain; Pre-Show	

NWA World Women's Tag Team Championship
Incoming champions – Pretty Empowered (Ella Envy and Kenzie Paige)
Date	Winner	Event/Show	Note(s)
February 11	The Renegade Twins (Charlette Renegade and Robyn Renegade)	Nuff Said	
February 12 (aired February 21)	Pretty Empowered 2.0 (Ella Envy and Roxy)	Powerrr	
February 12 (aired February 21)	M95 (Madi Wrenkowski and Missa Kate)	Powerrr	This was Wrenkowski's Champion Series cash-in match.
August 27	Pretty Empowered (Ella Envy and Kylie Paige)	NWA 75; Night 2	

=== NJPW ===
IWGP World Heavyweight Championship
Incoming champion – Jay White
Date	Winner	Event/Show	Note(s)
January 4	Kazuchika Okada	Wrestle Kingdom 17; Night 1	
April 8	Sanada	Sakura Genesis	

IWGP United States Heavyweight Championship
Incoming champion – Will Ospreay
Date	Winner	Event/Show	Note(s)
January 4	Kenny Omega	Wrestle Kingdom 17; Night 1	
June 25	Will Ospreay	Forbidden Door	On August 12, Ospreay rebranded the title as the IWGP United Kingdom Heavyweight Championship.
December 11	Deactivated	—	Replaced by the IWGP Global Heavyweight Championship.

IWGP Tag Team Championship
Incoming champions – FTR (Dax Harwood and Cash Wheeler)
Date	Winner	Event/Show	Note(s)
January 4	Bishamon (Hirooki Goto and Yoshi-Hashi)	Wrestle Kingdom 17; Night 1	
April 8	Aussie Open (Mark Davis and Kyle Fletcher)	Sakura Genesis	
May 21	Vacated	—	Vacated after Mark Davis suffered an injury.
June 4	Bishamon (Hirooki Goto and Yoshi-Hashi)	Dominion 6.4 in Osaka-jo Hall	Defeated House of Torture (Evil and Yujiro Takahashi) and United Empire (Great-O-Khan and Aaron Henare) in a Winner Takes All match also for the vacant Strong Openweight Tag Team Championship.

IWGP Junior Heavyweight Championship
Incoming champion – Taiji Ishimori
Date	Winner	Event/Show	Note(s)
January 4	Hiromu Takahashi	Wrestle Kingdom 17; Night 1	Four-way match also involving El Desperado and Master Wato

IWGP Junior Heavyweight Tag Team Championship
Incoming champions – Catch 2/2 (TJP and Francesco Akira)
Date	Winner	Event/Show	Note(s)
April 27	Intergalactic Jet Setters (Kushida and Kevin Knight)	Road to Wrestling Dontaku; Night 6	
June 4	Catch 2/2 (TJP and Francesco Akira)	Dominion 6.4 in Osaka-jo Hall	
July 4	Bullet Club War Dogs (Clark Connors and Drilla Moloney)	Independence Day; Night 1	

IWGP Women's Championship
Incoming champion – Kairi
Co-promoted with World Wonder Ring Stardom
Date	Winner	Event/Show	Note(s)
February 18	Mercedes Moné	Battle in the Valley	
April 23	Mayu Iwatani	Stardom All Star Grand Queendom	

NEVER Openweight Championship
Incoming champion – Karl Anderson
Date	Winner	Event/Show	Note(s)
January 4	Tama Tonga	Wrestle Kingdom 17; Night 1	
May 3	David Finlay	Wrestling Dontaku	
October 9	Tama Tonga	Destruction in Ryōgoku	
October 28	Shingo Takagi	Fighting Spirit Unleashed	

NEVER Openweight 6-Man Tag Team Championship
Incoming champions – House of Torture (Evil, Sho, and Yujiro Takahashi)
Date	Winner	Event/Show	Note(s)
February 11	Strong Style (Minoru Suzuki, El Desperado, and Ren Narita)	The New Beginning in Osaka	
May 3	Hiroshi Tanahashi and Chaos (Kazuchika Okada and Tomohiro Ishii)	Wrestling Dontaku	

KOPW
Incoming Champion (lineal) – Shingo Takagi
Date	Winner	Event/Show	Note(s)
January 5	Shingo Takagi	New Year Dash!! 2023	Defeated Great-O-Khan, Sho and Toru Yano to become the first provisional 2023 champion.
April 29	Taichi	Wrestling Satsuma No Kuni	This was a Takagi-Style Triad match after which Taichi became the second provisional 2023 champion.
September 24	Sho	Destruction in Kobe	Became the third provisional 2023 champion. Members of House of Torture and Just 5 Guys were handcuffed to each other.
November 17	Taichi	New Japan Road; Night 8	Became the fourth provisional 2023 champion. Yoshinobu Kanemaru was the special guest referee. As a result of losing, Sho was banned from wrestling in Yamagata Prefecture.
December 22	Taichi	Road to Tokyo Dome; Night 2	Defeated Yoshinobu Kanemaru in a whiskey bottle ladder match to become the official 2023 KOPW champion.

NJPW World Television Championship
(Title created)
Date	Winner	Event/Show	Note(s)
January 4	Zack Sabre Jr.	Wrestle Kingdom 17; Night 1	Defeated Ren Narita in a tournament final to become the inaugural champion.

Strong Openweight Championship
Incoming Champion – Fred Rosser
Date	Winner	Event/Show	Note(s)
February 18	Kenta	Battle in the Valley	
May 3	Hikuleo	Wrestling Dontaku	
May 21	Kenta	Resurgence	Won the title by countout.
July 5	Eddie Kingston	Independence Day; Night 2	

Strong Openweight Tag Team Championship
Incoming champions – The Motor City Machine Guns (Alex Shelley and Chris Sabin)
Date	Winner	Event/Show	Note(s)
April 15	Aussie Open (Mark Davis and Kyle Fletcher)	Capital Collision	Three-way tag team match also involving Dream Team (Kazuchika Okada and Hiroshi Tanahashi).
May 21	Vacated	—	Vacated after Mark Davis suffered an injury.
June 4	Bishamon (Hirooki Goto and Yoshi-Hashi)	Dominion 6.4 in Osaka-jo Hall	Defeated House of Torture (Evil and Yujiro Takahashi) and United Empire (Great-O-Khan and Aaron Henare) in a Winner Takes All match also for the vacant IWGP Tag Team Championship.
July 4	Bullet Club War Dogs (Alex Coughlin and Gabriel Kidd)	Independence Day; Night 1	
October 9	Guerrillas of Destiny (Hikuleo and El Phantasmo)	Destruction in Ryōgoku	

Strong Women's Championship
(Title created)
Co-promoted with World Wonder Ring Stardom
Date	Winner	Event/Show	Note(s)
May 21	Willow Nightingale	Resurgence	Defeated Mercedes Moné in a tournament final to become the inaugural champion.
July 5	Giulia	Independence Day; Night 2	

=== Stardom ===
World of Stardom Championship
Incoming champion – Giulia
Date	Winner	Event/Show	Note(s)
April 23	Tam Nakano	All Star Grand Queendom	
November 20	Vacated	—	Vacated after Nakano was sidelined with injury.
December 29	Maika	Dream Queendom 3	Defeated Suzu Suzuki to win the vacant title.

Wonder of Stardom Championship
Incoming champion – Saya Kamitani
Date	Winner	Event/Show	Note(s)
April 23	Mina Shirakawa	All Star Grand Queendom	
May 27	Tam Nakano	Flashing Champions	Winner Takes All match also for Nakano's World of Stardom Championship.
July 2	Mirai	Mid Summer Champions	
December 29	Saori Anou	Dream Queendom 3	

Goddesses of Stardom Championship
Incoming champion – 7Upp (Nanae Takahashi and Yuu)
Date	Winner	Event/Show	Note(s)
April 23	The New Eras (Ami Sourei and Mirai)	All Star Grand Queendom	Won the titles by countout.
June 25	Rose Gold (Mina Shirakawa and Mariah May)	Sunshine	
August 13	REStart (Natsupoi and Saori Anou)	Stardom x Stardom: Osaka Summer Team	
November 20	Vacated	—	Vacated after Natsupoi was sidelined with injury.
December 2	AphrOditE (Utami Hayashishita and Saya Kamitani)	Nagoya Big Winter	Defeated Divine Kingdom (Maika and Megan Bayne) to win the vacant titles.

Artist of Stardom Championship
Incoming champions – Prominence (Risa Sera, Suzu Suzuki, and Hiragi Kurumi)
Date	Winner	Event/Show	Note(s)
April 23	REStart (Kairi, Natsupoi, and Saori Anou)	All Star Grand Queendom	
May 27	Baribari Bombers (Giulia, Thekla, and Mai Sakurai)	Flashing Champions	

High Speed Championship
Incoming champion – AZM
Date	Winner	Event/Show	Note(s)
May 27	Saki Kashima	Flashing Champions	Three-way match also involving Fukigen Death.
October 9	Mei Seira	Nagoya Golden Fight; Pre-Show	

Future of Stardom Championship
Incoming champion – Ami Sohrei
Date	Winner	Event/Show	Note(s)
May 12	Rina	New Blood 8	

Stardom New Blood Tag Team Championship
(Title created)
Date	Winner	Event/Show	Note(s)
March 25	Bloody Fate (Karma and Starlight Kid)	New Blood Premium	Defeated God's Eye (Mirai and Tomoka Inaba) in a tournament final to become the inaugural champions.
September 29	wing★gori (Saya Iida and Hanan)	New Blood 11	Three-way tag team match also involving 02line (AZM and Miyu Amasaki).

IWGP Women's Championship
Incoming champion – Kairi
Co-promoted with New Japan Pro-Wrestling
Date	Winner	Event/Show	Note(s)
February 18	Mercedes Moné	NJPW Battle in the Valley	
April 23	Mayu Iwatani	All Star Grand Queendom	

Strong Women's Championship
(Title created)
Co-promoted with New Japan Pro-Wrestling
Date	Winner	Event/Show	Note(s)
May 21	Willow Nightingale	Resurgence	Defeated Mercedes Moné in a tournament final to become the inaugural champion.
July 5	Giulia	Independence Day; Night 2	

=== Progress ===
PROGRESS World Championship
Incoming champion – Spike Trivet
No title changes.

Progress Wrestling Atlas Championship
Incoming champion – Big Damo
Date	Winner	Event/Show	Note(s)
February 26	Ricky Knight Jr.	Chapter 150: When The Man Comes Around	

Progress Tag Team Championship
Incoming champion – Sunshine Machine (Chuck Mambo and TK Cooper)
Date	Winner	Event/Show	Note(s)
May 28	Smokin' Aces (Charlie Sterling and Nick Riley)	Chapter 153: Super Strong Style 16 Tournament Edition 2023; Night 2	Ladder match

Progress Wrestling World Women's Championship
Incoming champion – Lana Austin
Date	Winner	Event/Show	Note(s)
October 22	Rhio	Chapter 158: The Long Halloween	

Progress Proteus Championship
Incoming champion – Paul Robinson
Date	Winner	Event/Show	Note(s)
No title changes

=== PWG ===
PWG World Championship
Incoming champion – Daniel Garcia
No title changes.

PWG World Tag Team Championship
Incoming champion – The Kings of the Black Throne (Malakai Black and Brody King)
No title changes.

=== Zero1 ===
==== Zero1 Japan ====
World Heavyweight Championship
Incoming champion – Masato Tanaka
Date	Winner	Event/Show	Note(s)
May 26	Chris Vice	Fibromyalgia Charity Show	

United National Heavyweight Championship
Incoming champion – Chris Vice
No title changes.

World Junior Heavyweight Championship
Incoming champion – Astroman
Date	Winner	Event/Show	Note(s)
January 1 (aired January 10)	Leo Isaka	Happy New Year	This was a Winner Takes All match also for Astroman's International Junior Heavyweight Championship.
July 15	Takumi Baba	23rd Midsummer Festival ~ Fire Festival 2023; Night 5	This was a Winner Takes All match also for Isaka's International Junior Heavyweight Championship.

International Junior Heavyweight Championship
Incoming champion – Astroman
Date	Winner	Event/Show	Note(s)
January 1 (aired January 10)	Leo Isaka	Happy Nea Year	This was a Winner Takes All match also for Astroman's World Junior Heavyweight Championship.
July 15	Takumi Baba	23rd Midsummer Festival ~ Fire Festival 2023; Night 5	This was a Winner Takes All match also for Isaka's World Junior Heavyweight Championship.

Intercontinental Tag Team Championship
Incoming champions – Junya Matsunaga and Takafumi
Date	Winner	Event/Show	Note(s)
January 1 (aired January 10)	The Kubota Brothers (Hide Kubota and Yasu Kubota)	Happy New Year	

==== Zero1 USA ====
Zero1 USA Heavyweight Championship
Incoming champion – Joey O'Riley
No title changes.

Zero1 USA World Junior Heavyweight Championship
Incoming champion – Victor Analog
No title changes.

Zero1 USA World Tag Team Championship
Incoming champions – Country Air (Doc Simmons and Zach Hendrix)
Date	Winner	Event/Show	Note(s)
May 6	The Premier (Campbell Myers & SK Bishop)	Zero1 USA	
September 9	Constant Headache (Anakin Murphy & Kenny Kalix)	Zero1 USA	

Zero1 USA World Women's Championship
Incoming champion – Max the Impaler
No title changes.

==== Super Fireworks Pro ====
Blast King Championship
Incoming champion – Taru
No title changes.

Blast Queen Championship
Incoming champion – Hiroyo Matsumoto
Date	Winner	Event/Show	Note(s)
July 22	Aja Kong	23rd Midsummer Festival ~ Fire Festival 2023; Night 6	

Blast King Tag Team Championship
Incoming champions – Revengers (Masato Tanaka and Hide Kubota)
No title changes.

=== ROH ===
ROH World Championship
Incoming champion – Claudio Castagnoli
Date	Winner	Event/Show	Note(s)
September 20	Eddie Kingston	AEW Dynamite: Grand Slam	Winner Takes All match also for Kingston's Strong Openweight Championship.

ROH World Television Championship
Incoming champion – Samoa Joe
Date	Winner	Event/Show	Note(s)
November 8	Vacated	AEW Dynamite	Joe vacated the title to focus on the AEW World Championship.
December 15	Kyle Fletcher	Final Battle	Defeated Komander, Bryan Keith, Lee Moriarty, Dalton Castle, and Lee Johnson in the Survival of the Fittest finals to win the vacant title.

ROH Pure Championship
Incoming champion – Wheeler Yuta
Date	Winner	Event/Show	Note(s)
March 31	Katsuyori Shibata	Supercard of Honor	
November 25	Wheeler Yuta	AEW Rampage	

ROH Women's World Championship
Incoming champion – Athena
No title changes.

ROH World Tag Team Championship
Incoming champions – The Briscoe Brothers (Jay Briscoe and Mark Briscoe)
Date	Winner	Event/Show	Note(s)
March 8 (aired March 10)	Vacated	AEW Rampage	On January 17, Jay was killed in a car accident in Laurel, Delaware. Mark would continue to be recognized as co-champion until the title was vacated.
March 31	The Lucha Brothers (Penta El Zero Miedo and Rey Fenix)	Supercard of Honor	Defeated Top Flight (Darius Martin and Dante Martin), The Kingdom (Matt Taven and Mike Bennett), Aussie Open (Mark Davis and Kyle Fletcher), and La Facción Ingobernable (Rush and Dralístico) in a "Reach for the Sky" ladder match to win the vacant titles.
July 21	Aussie Open (Mark Davis and Kyle Fletcher)	Death Before Dishonor	Four-way tag team match also involving Best Friends (Chuck Taylor and Trent Beretta) and The Kingdom (Matt Taven and Mike Bennett).
August 27	Better Than You Bay Bay (MJF and Adam Cole)	AEW All In; Zero Hour	First time the title changed hands on an All Elite Wrestling (AEW) show. A month after this win, Cole was legitimately injured. MJF subsequently defended the title on his own in handicap matches or with Samoa Joe substituting for Cole, but Joe was not recognized as champion.
December 27	The Kingdom (Matt Taven and Mike Bennett)	AEW Dynamite: New Year's Smash	2-on-1 Handicap match. The Kingdom won the title under the guise of "The Devil's Masked Men" and were originally unidentified until they were revealed at Worlds End.

ROH World Six-Man Tag Team Championship
Incoming champions – The Mogul Embassy (Brian Cage, Jasper Kaun, and Toa Liona)
Date	Winner	Event/Show	Note(s)
September 20 (aired September 22)	The Elite ("Hangman" Adam Page, Matt Jackson and Nick Jackson)	AEW Rampage: Grand Slam	First time the titles changed hands on an All Elite Wrestling show.
November 1	The Mogul Embassy (Toa Liona, Bishop Kaun and Brian Cage)	AEW Dynamite	

=== RevPro ===
Undisputed British Heavyweight Championship
Incoming champions – Great-O-Khan
Date	Winner	Event/Show	Note(s)
July 9	Michael Oku	Epic Encounter	

Undisputed British Cruiserweight Championship
Incoming champion – Robbie X
Date	Winner	Event/Show	Note(s)
July 9	Connor Mills	Epic Encounter	
December 16	Leon Slater	Uprising	

Undisputed British Women's Championship
Incoming champion – Alex Windsor
Date	Winner	Event/Show	Note(s)
December 16	Dani Luna	Uprising	

Undisputed British Tag Team Championship
Incoming champions – Greedy Souls (Brendan White and Danny Jones)
Date	Winner	Event/Show	Note(s)
July 9	Subculture (Mark Andrews and Flash Morgan Webster)	Epic Encounter	

=== Tenryu Project ===
International Junior Heavyweight Championship
Incoming champions – Hikaru Sato
Date	Winner	Event/Show	Note(s)
September 21	Yuya Susumu	Still Revolution Vol. 6	

International Junior Heavyweight Tag Team Championship
Incoming champions – Kenichiro Arai and Rey Paloma
Date	Winner	Event/Show	Note(s)
March 26	Oji Shiiba and Takuro Niki	Wrestle and Romance Vol. 11	
August 16	Keita Yano and Yuya Susumu	Still Revolution Vol. 5	

Tenryu Project World 6-Man Tag Team Championship
Incoming champions – Kenichiro Arai, Kohei Sato, and Masayuki Kono
Date	Winner	Event/Show	Note(s)
June 20	Gaina, Kouki Iwasaki, and Kengo	Still Revolution Vol. 3	2-out-of-3 falls match. Gaina, Iwasaki, and Kengo won 2–1.
October 17	Kuma Arashi, Masayuki Kono, and Yusuke Kodama	Still Revolution Vol. 7	2-out-of-3 falls match. Arashi, Kono, and Kodama won 2–1.
November 19	Okami (Daichi Hashimoto, Hideyoshi Kamitani) and Kazuki Hashimoto	Ryūkon Cup III: Live For Today	2-out-of-3 falls match. Hashimoto, Kamitani and Hashimoto won 2–1.

United National Tag Team Championship
Incoming champions – (Title created)
Date	Winner	Event/Show	Note(s)
June 10	Atsuki Aoyagi and Yuma Aoyagi	Tenryu Project UN Tag Team Inaugural Championship 1 Day Tournament	Defeated Masayuki Kono and Yusuke Kodama in a tournament final to become the inaugural champions.
July 16	Evolution (Suwama and Dan Tamura)	Summer Action Series 2023	This was an All Japan Pro Wrestling event.
November 19	Hideki Suzuki and Hikaru Sato	Ryūkon Cup III: Live For Today	

=== WOW ===
WOW World Championship
Incoming champions – Penelope Pink
Date	Winner	Event/Show	Note(s)
August 3 (aired September 30)	Princess Aussie	WOW Season 9: Episode 3	This was a three-way match also involving Tormenta.
August 24 (aired December 9)	Abilene Maverick	WOW Season 9: Episode 13	This was a "Championship Challenge" also involving Tormenta, The Beast, and Penelope Pink.
December 14 (aired June 1, 2024)	The Beast	WOW Season 9: Episode 38	

WOW World Tag Team Championship
Incoming champions – Miami's Sweet Heat (Laurie Carlson and Lindsey Carlson)
Date	Winner	Event/Show	Note(s)
June 25 (aired August 27)	The Tonga Twins (Kaoz and Kona)	WOW Season 8: Episode 50	This was a falls count anywhere match.
December 14 (aired February 17, 2024)	Miami's Sweet Heat (Laurie Carlson and Lindsay Carlson)	WOW Season 9: Episode 23	
December 14 (aired March 9, 2024)	The Mother Truckers (Big Rig Betty and Holly Swag)	WOW Season 9: Episode 26	This was a hardcore match.
December 14 (aired August 31, 2024)	Miami's Sweet Heat (Laurie Carlson and Lindsay Carlson)	WOW Season 9: Episode 51	

WOW Trios Championship
(Title created)
Date	Winner	Event/Show	Note(s)
December 16 (aired March 16, 2024)	Top Tier (Coach Campanelli, Gloria Glitter, and Kandi Crush)	WOW Season 9: Episode 27	Defeated eXile (Genesis, Exodus, and Ice Cold) in a tournament final to become the inaugural champions.

=== XPW ===
XPW World Heavyweight Championship
Incoming champions – Masada
Date	Winner	Event/Show	Note(s)
May 27	Alex Colon	Broken Beat and Scarred	
September 30	Shlak	South of Heaven	

XPW King of the Deathmatch Championship
Incoming champions – Shlak
No title changes.

XPW Women's Championship
Incoming champions – Ludark Shaitan
Date	Winner	Event/Show	Note(s)
November 25	Mickie Knuckles	Drive In Massacre	

XPW FITE TV Championship
Incoming champions – Kat Martini
No title changes.

=== wXw ===
wXw Unified World Wrestling Championship
Incoming champion – Levaniel
Date	Winner	Event/Show	Note(s)
February 11	Vacated	—	Vacated due to Levaniel failing to qualify for the 16 Carat Gold Tournament, where he was scheduled to defend his title.
March 12	Shigehiro Irie	wXw 16 Carat Gold; Night 3	Defeated Axel Tischer in the final of the 16 Carat Gold Tournament to win the vacant title.
June 17	Robert Dreissker	Drive of Champions	

wXw Shotgun Championship
Incoming champion – Maggot
Date	Winner	Event/Show	Note(s)
January 28	Laurance Roman	Back to the Roots	
October 21	Elijah Blum	We Love Wrestling - Live in Bielefeld	
December 23	The Rotation	23rd Anniversary	Six-way scramble also involving Alex Duke, Bobby Gunns, Jacob Crane, and Nick Schreier.

wXw World Tag Team Championship
Incoming champions – Frenchadors (Aigle Blanc and Senza Volto)
Date	Winner	Event/Show	Note(s)
March 11	Arrows of Hungary (Dover and Icarus)	wXw 16 Carat Gold; Night 2	
June 17	Only Friends (Bobby Gunns and Michael Knight)	Drive of Champions	Two-out-of-three falls match. Only Friends won 2–1.
September 23	Amboss (Laurance Roman and Robert Dreissker)	N/A	
September 24	Cash & Hektor (Dennis Dullnig and Hektor Invictus	World Tag Team Festival	This was the final match of the World Tag Team Festival, a three-way tag team match also involving Renegades (Mizuki Watase and Shigehiro Irie).
November 11	Amboss (Icarus and Laurance Roman)	Broken Rules XXI	Ladder match.
December 23	Cash & Hektor (Dennis Dullnig and Hektor Invictus	23rd Anniversary	

wXw Women's Championship
Incoming champion – Aliss Ink
Date	Winner	Event/Show	Note(s)
March 18	Baby Allison	wXw 16 Carat Gold; Night 2	
April 22	Ava Everett	True Colors	
July 8	Delmi Exo	MLW Never Say Never	Winner Takes All match in which Exo's MLW World Women's Featherweight Championship was also on the line. Promoted by Major League Wrestling.
August 25	Ava Everett	We Love Wrestling	
November 11	Masha Slamovich	Broken Rules XXI	Last Woman Standing match.
December 23	Unified	—	Unified with the wXw Unified World Wrestling Championship after Robert Dreissker defeated Masha Slamovich in a winner-takes-all match.

wXw Academy Trophy Championship
Incoming champion – Oskar
Date	Winner	Event/Show	Note(s)
May 20	Deactivated	—	Deactivated and immediately replaced by the xWx Academy Championship, which has a separate lineage.

wXw Academy Championship
Incoming champion – Vacant
Date	Winner	Event/Show	Note(s)
May 5	Nick Schreier	wXw Wrestling Academy Live Volume 9	Defeated Alex Duke, Danny Fray, and Darius in a four-way elimination match to become the inaugural champion.
August 18	Alex Duke	Passion Pro Spirit Zone	Four-way match also involving Danny Fray and Zafar Ameen. Promoted by Passion Pro.
August 19	Nick Schreier	Passion Pro 9	Promoted by Passion Pro
November 1	Danny Fray	Heat in Der wXw Wrestling Academy	

=== WWE ===
– Raw
– SmackDown
– NXT
– Unbranded

==== Raw and SmackDown ====
Raw and SmackDown each have a world championship, a secondary championship, a women's championship, and a male tag team championship. There is also a women's tag team championship, available to both brands.

Undisputed WWE Universal Championship
(WWE Championship and WWE Universal Championship)
Incoming champion – Roman Reigns
Since April 3, 2022, Reigns had held the WWE Championship and WWE Universal Championship together as the Undisputed WWE Universal Championship, which he had defended on both brands.
The Undisputed WWE Universal Championship became exclusive to the SmackDown brand following April and May's WWE Draft when Roman Reigns was drafted to SmackDown.
No title changes.

World Heavyweight Championship
(Title created)
Date	Winner	Event/Show	Note(s)
May 27	Seth "Freakin" Rollins	Night of Champions	Defeated AJ Styles in a tournament final to become the inaugural champion.

WWE United States Championship
Incoming champion – Austin Theory
Date	Winner	Event/Show	Note(s)
The title became exclusive to the SmackDown brand following April and May's WWE Draft when Austin Theory was drafted to SmackDown.
August 11	Rey Mysterio	SmackDown	
November 4	Logan Paul	Crown Jewel	

WWE Intercontinental Championship
Incoming champion – Gunther
The title became exclusive to the Raw brand following April and May's WWE Draft when Gunther was drafted to Raw.
No title changes.

WWE Raw Women's Championship
Incoming champion – Bianca Belair
The title became exclusive to the SmackDown brand following April and May's WWE Draft when Bianca Belair was drafted to SmackDown.
Date	Winner	Event/Show	Note(s)
May 27	Asuka	Night of Champions	
The title reverted to its original name of WWE Women's Championship on June 9.
August 5	Bianca Belair	SummerSlam	This was a triple threat match, also involving Charlotte Flair.
August 5	Iyo Sky	SummerSlam	This was Sky's Money in the Bank contract cash-in match.

WWE SmackDown Women's Championship
Incoming champion – Charlotte Flair
Date	Winner	Event/Show	Note(s)
April 1	Rhea Ripley	WrestleMania 39; Night 1	
The title became exclusive to the Raw brand following April and May's WWE Draft when Rhea Ripley was drafted to Raw.
The title was renamed as Women's World Championship on June 12.

Undisputed WWE Tag Team Championship (WWE Raw Tag Team Championship and WWE SmackDown Tag Team Championship)
Incoming champions – The Usos (Jey Uso and Jimmy Uso)
Since May 20, 2022, the Raw Tag Team Championship and SmackDown Tag Team Championship had been held and defended together as the Undisputed WWE Tag Team Championship.
Date	Winner	Event/Show	Note(s)
April 1	Kevin Owens and Sami Zayn	WrestleMania 39; Night 1	Owens and Zayn won the titles as members of different brands (Owens on Raw and Zayn on SmackDown); both were drafted to Raw as a result of the WWE Draft.
September 2	The Judgment Day (Finn Bálor and Damian Priest)	Payback	This was a Steel City Street Fight.
October 7	Cody Rhodes and Jey Uso	Fastlane	
October 16	The Judgment Day (Finn Bálor and Damian Priest)	Raw	

WWE Women's Tag Team Championship
Incoming champions – Damage CTRL (Dakota Kai and Iyo Sky)
Date	Winner	Event/Show	Note(s)
February 27	Becky Lynch and Lita	Raw	
April 10	Raquel Rodriguez and Liv Morgan	Raw	Trish Stratus substituted for an injured Lita and took the pin. Rodriguez and Morgan won the titles as members of the SmackDown brand, but were drafted to Raw as a result of the WWE Draft.
May 19	Vacated	SmackDown	Raquel Rodriguez and Liv Morgan were forced to relinquish the title after Morgan suffered a shoulder injury.
May 29	Ronda Rousey and Shayna Baszler	Raw	Defeated the teams of Chelsea Green and Sonya Deville, Raquel Rodriguez and Shotzi, and Damage CTRL (Bayley and Iyo Sky) in a fatal four-way tag team match to win the vacant title.
On the June 23 episode of SmackDown, the NXT Women's Tag Team Championship was unified into the WWE Women's Tag Team Championship, with the NXT title being retired and the WWE title becoming available to NXT once again.
July 1	Raquel Rodriguez and Liv Morgan	Money in the Bank	
July 17	Chelsea Green and Sonya Deville/Piper Niven	Raw	Green had originally won the title with Deville; however, after Deville suffered a legitimate knee injury, she was replaced by Niven on the August 14, 2023, episode of Raw. WWE considers this a continuation of Green's reign that began with Deville, and thus is not counted as a second reign for Green.
December 18	Katana Chance and Kayden Carter	Raw	

==== NXT ====
NXT Championship
Incoming champion – Bron Breakker
Date	Winner	Event/Show	Note(s)
April 1	Carmelo Hayes	Stand & Deliver	
September 30	Ilja Dragunov	No Mercy	

NXT North American Championship
Incoming champion – Wes Lee
Date	Winner	Event/Show	Note(s)
July 18	"Dirty" Dominik Mysterio	NXT	
September 30	Trick Williams	No Mercy	Dragon Lee was the special guest referee.
October 3	"Dirty" Dominik Mysterio	NXT	
December 9	Dragon Lee	Deadline	

NXT Women's Championship
Incoming champion – Roxanne Perez
Date	Winner	Event/Show	Note(s)
April 1	Indi Hartwell	Stand & Deliver	This was a six-way ladder match, also involving Zoey Stark, Gigi Dolin, Tiffany Stratton, and Lyra Valkyria.
May 2	Vacated	NXT	Indi Hartwell relinquished the title as a result of being drafted to Raw in the WWE Draft and also due to a leg injury.
May 28	Tiffany Stratton	Battleground	Defeated Lyra Valkyria in a tournament final to win the vacant title.
September 12	Becky Lynch	NXT	
October 24	Lyra Valkyria	NXT: Halloween Havoc; Week 1	

NXT Tag Team Championship
Incoming champions – The New Day (Kofi Kingston and Xavier Woods)
Date	Winner	Event/Show	Note(s)
February 4	Gallus (Mark Coffey and Wolfgang)	Vengeance Day	This was a fatal four-way tag team match, also involving the teams of Chase University (Andre Chase and Duke Hudson) and Pretty Deadly (Elton Prince and Kit Wilson).
July 30	The Family (Tony D'Angelo and Channing "Stacks" Lorenzo)	The Great American Bash	
October 24	Chase University (Andre Chase and Duke Hudson)	NXT: Halloween Havoc; Week 1	
November 14	The Family (Tony D'Angelo and Channing "Stacks" Lorenzo)	NXT	

NXT Women's Tag Team Championship
Incoming champions – Katana Chance and Kayden Carter
Date	Winner	Event/Show	Note(s)
February 4	Fallon Henley and Kiana James	Vengeance Day	
April 1	Alba Fyre and Isla Dawn	Stand & Deliver	Fyre and Dawn were drafted to SmackDown as a result of the WWE Draft, although the title remained on NXT.
June 23	Unified	SmackDown	Ronda Rousey and Shayna Baszler defeated Alba Fyre and Isla Dawn to unify the NXT Women's Tag Team Championship into the WWE Women's Tag Team Championship. Fyre and Dawn are recognized as the final champions with Rousey and Baszler going forward as the unified WWE Women's Tag Team Champions.

NXT UK Heritage Cup
Incoming champion – Noam Dar
After a hiatus following NXT UK's closure in September 2022, the title was transferred to the NXT brand in April 2023 and subsequently renamed NXT Heritage Cup.
Date	Winner	Event/Show	Note(s)
June 13	Nathan Frazer	NXT	Won 2–1. Oro Mensah defended the title on behalf of an injured Noam Dar.
August 22	Noam Dar	NXT: Heatwave	Won 2–1.

== Awards and honors ==
=== AAA ===
==== AAA Hall of Fame ====
Inductee
Cassandro

=== Cauliflower Alley Club ===
Award	Recipient(s)
Iron Mike Mazurki Award	CM Punk
Lou Thesz/Art Abrams Lifetime Achievement Award	Ron Simmons
Men's Wrestling Award	Koko B. Ware
Men's Wrestling Award	Joe Malenko
Women's Wrestling Award	Mickie James
Tag Team Award	The Nasty Boys (Brian Knobbs and Jerry Saggs)
Lucha Libre Award	Damián 666
Independent Wrestling Award	Riea Von Slasher
James C. Melby Historian Award	Koji Miyamoto
Posthumous Award	Killer Karl Kox
Charlie Smith Referee Award	Kevin Jefferies
REEL Award	Al Burke
Courage Award	Patrisha Summerland

=== DPW ===
==== DPW Awards ====
Category	Winner
Wrestler of the Year	Jay Malachi
Tag Team of the Year	The WorkHorsemen (Anthony Henry and JD Drake)
Breakout Star of the Year	Bryan Keith
Moment of the Year	Chris Danger challenges Adam Cole on Spark
Match of the Year	Chris Danger vs. Shawn Spears at World's Strongest
Event of the Year	Carolina Classic

=== ESPN ===
==== ESPN Wrestling Awards ====
Award	Winner
Male Wrestler of the Year	Cody Rhodes
Female Wrestler of the Year	Rhea Ripley
Tag Team of the Year	FTR (Dax Harwood and Cash Wheeler)
Debut of the Year	CM Punk
Breakthrough Wrestler of the Year	LA Knight
Promo Artist of the Year	MJF
Match of the Year	Will Ospreay (c) vs. Kenny Omega for the IWGP United States Heavyweight Championship at Wrestle Kingdom 17
Match of the Year	Kenny Omega (c) vs. Will Ospreay for the IWGP United States Heavyweight Championship at Forbidden Door
Best PPV Event of the Year	WrestleMania 39
Best Storyline of the Year	The Bloodline

=== Fightful ===
==== Fightful Awards ====
Award	Winner
Men’s Overall Performer of the Year	MJF
Women’s Overall Performer of the Year	Rhea Ripley
Men’s In-Ring Wrestler of the Year	Will Ospreay
Women’s In-Ring Wrestler of the Year	Athena
Men's Tag Team of the Year	FTR (Dax Harwood and Cash Wheeler)
Women's Tag Team of the Year	Chelsea Green and Sonya Deville / Piper Niven
Trio/Stable of the Year	The Judgment Day
Indie Act of the Year	Deathmatch Royalty (Matt Cardona and Steph De Lander)
Rookie of the Year	Sol Ruca
Manager of the Year	Prince Nana
Announcer of the Year	Michael Cole
Men's Best of Promos	MJF
Women’s Best of Promos	"Timeless" Toni Storm
Best Individual Promo	"Hangman" Adam Page and Swerve Strickland face-to-face on Dynamite (November 15)
Finisher of the Year	Storm Breaker (Will Ospreay)
Gear of the Year	Zelina Vega at Backlash
Best Talent Media of the Year	Hey! (EW) (RJ City)
Booker of the Year	Triple H
Moment of the Year	CM Punk Returns to WWE at Survivor Series: WarGames
Feud of the Year	Kevin Owens and Sami Zayn vs. The Bloodline
Storyline of the Year	MJF and Adam Cole (Better Than You, Bay Bay and "The Devil")
Men's Match of the Year	Kenny Omega (c) vs. Will Ospreay for the IWGP United States Heavyweight Championship at Forbidden Door
Women's Match of the Year	Charlotte Flair (c) vs. Rhea Ripley for the WWE SmackDown Women's Championship at WrestleMania 39 (Night 1)
Tag Team Match of the Year	FTR (Dax Harwood and Cash Wheeler) (c) vs. Bullet Club Gold (Jay white and Juice Robinson) in a two out of three falls match for the AEW World Tag Team Championship on Collision (July 15)
Event of the Year	All In
Promotion of the Year	WWE
Documentary/Film of the Year	The Iron Claw
Wrestling News Story of the Year	The "Brawl In," CM Punk fired from All Elite Wrestling

=== GCW ===
==== Indie Wrestling Hall of Fame ====
Inductee	Inducted by
Christopher Daniels	Frankie Kazarian
Cheerleader Melissa	Dave Prazak
Jimmy Jacobs	Alex Shelley
Michael Modest	Barry W. Blaustein
Excalibur	Orange Cassidy
Paul London	Rick Bassman

==== Deathmatch Hall of Fame ====
Inductee
John Zandig
Brain Damage
Lowlife Louie
"Piss Jug" Mike Biezsck

=== George Tragos/Lou Thesz Professional Wrestling Hall of Fame ===
Category	Inductee
Singles Inductee	Gary Albright
Frank Gotch Award	Haku
James C. Melby Award	Tom Burke
Lou Thesz Award	Bill DeMott
Gordon Solie Award	Conrad Thompson
Jack Brisco Spotlight Award	Les Thatcher
Verne Gagne Trainer Award	Boris Malenko

=== Impact ===
==== Impact Hall of Fame ====
Category	Inductee	Inducted by
Individual	Traci Brooks	Gail Kim
Group	Mike Tenay and Don West	Scott D'Amore

==== Impact Year End Awards ====
Category	Winner
Male Wrestler of the Year	Alex Shelley
Knockout of the Year	Trinity
Men's Tag Team of the Year	ABC (Ace Austin and Chris Bey)
Knockouts Tag Team of the Year	MK Ultra (Masha Slamovich and Killer Kelly)
X Division Star of the Year	Mike Bailey
Match of the Year	Will Ospreay vs. Mike Bailey at Bound for Glory
Moment of the Year	The return of TNA announced at Bound for Glory
One to Watch in 2024	KiLynn King

=== International Professional Wrestling Hall of Fame ===
Category	Inductees
Individual	June Byers
Individual	Dan McLeod
Individual	Dr. B.F. Roller
Individual	Georg Lurich
Individual	Tom Connors
Individual	Verne Gagne
Individual	Gorgeous George
Individual	Mitsuharu Misawa
Individual	Bert Assirati
Individual	Bret Hart
Individual	Bob Backlund
Individual	Bobo Brazil
Individual	Reginald Siki
Individual	The Great Muta
Individual	Kenta Kobashi
Excelsior Award	Dave LaGreca
Rocky Johnson Award	Joe Defino
Trailblazer Award	Christine "Teeny" Jarrett

=== New England Pro Wrestling Hall of Fame ===
Category	Inductees
Individual	Steve Taylor
Individual	D. C. Drake
Individual	James Allen
Individual	Mike McGuirk
Individual	Joel Gertner
Individual	Don Vega
Individual	George Carroll Jr.
Individual	Barry Horowitz
Individual	Richard Lannon
Individual	John Xavier
Individual	Paul Perez
Individual	D. C. Dillinger
Shuhei Aoki Humanitarian Award	Paula J. Lucier

=== NJPW ===
==== NJPW Concurso (Best Body) ====
Winner
Douki

=== Pro Wrestling Illustrated ===
==== Yearly Rankings ====
List	Ranked No. 1
PWI 500	Seth Rollins
PWI Women's 250	Rhea Ripley
PWI Tag Team 100	FTR (Dax Harwood and Cash Wheeler)

==== Pro Wrestling Illustrated awards ====
Category	Winner
Wrestler of the Year	Seth Rollins
Woman of the Year	Rhea Ripley
Tag Team of the Year	FTR (Dax Harwood and Cash Wheeler)
Faction of the Year	The Judgment Day
Match of the Year	Charlotte Flair (c) vs. Rhea Ripley for the WWE SmackDown Women's Championship on Night 1 of WrestleMania 39
Feud of the Year	Sami Zayn vs. The Bloodline
Most Popular Wrestler of the Year	Cody Rhodes
Most Hated Wrestler of the Year	"Dirty" Dominik Mysterio
Comeback of the Year	Trinity
Most Improved Wrestler of the Year	LA Knight
Indie Wrestler of the Year	Matt Cardona
Inspirational Wrestler of the Year	Mark Briscoe
Rookie of the Year	Sol Ruca
Stanley Weston Award (Lifetime Achievement)	Sting and Nancy Benoit

=== St. Louis Wrestling Hall of Fame ===
Category	Inductee
Wrestling	Gerald Brisco
Wrestling	J. J. Dillon

=== Stardom ===
==== 5★Star GP Awards ====
Award	Winner
Blue Stars Best Match Award	Maika vs. Mirai on September 30
Red Stars Best Match Award	Hazuki vs. Suzu Suzuki on September 23
Fighting Spirit Award	Natsuko Tora
Outstanding Performance Award	Natsupoi
Technique/Skill Award	AZM

==== Stardom Year-End Awards ====
Award	Winner
Best Match Award	Giulia (c) vs. Megan Bayne for the Strong Women's Championship at Dream Queendom
Best Tag Team Award	REStart (Natsupoi and Saori Anou)
Best Technique Award	Mirai
Best Unit Award	Queen's Quest
Fighting Spirit Award	Suzu Suzuki
MVP Award	Tam Nakano
Outstanding Performance Award	Mayu Iwatani
Shining Award	Maika

=== Women's Wrestling Hall of Fame ===
Category	Inductee
Pro Wrestler	Cora Livingston
Pro Wrestler	Mildred Burke
Pro Wrestler	Beverly Shade
Pro Wrestler	Marva Scott
Pro Wrestler	Ethel Johnson
Pro Wrestler	Babs Wingo
Pro Wrestler	Sue Green
Pro Wrestler	Jazz
Pro Wrestler	Luna Vachon
Pro Wrestler	Madusa
Valets/Referees/Managers/Promoters	Rita Chatterton
Amateur	Iryna Merleni
Group	Toni Rose and Donna Christanello
Promotion	GLOW

==== WWHOF Awards ====
Award	Recipient
Pro Wrestler of the Year	Kamille
Most Improved Wrestler of the Year	Jordynne Grace
Broadcaster of the Year	Velvet Sky
Courage Award	Dawn Whitman
Historian Award	Tom Burke
Film/TV Award	Laurene Landon
Journalism Award	Jamie Hemmings

=== Wrestling Observer Newsletter ===
==== Wrestling Observer Newsletter Hall of Fame ====
Category	Inductee
Individual	Tomohiro Ishii
Individual	Sgt. Slaughter
Individual	Blue Panther
Individual	George Kidd
Tag Team	The Briscos (Jack Brisco and Jerry Brisco)
Tag Team	Beauty Pair (Jackie Sato and Maki Ueda)
Tag Team	Antonino Rocca and Miguel Pérez

==== Wrestling Observer Newsletter awards ====
Category	Winner
Lou Thesz/Ric Flair Award (Wrestler of the Year)	Will Ospreay
Most Outstanding Wrestler	Will Ospreay
Tag Team of the Year	FTR (Dax Harwood and Cash Wheeler)
Best on Interviews	Eddie Kingston
Promotion of the Year	WWE
Best Weekly TV Show	AEW Dynamite
Match of the Year	Will Ospreay (c) vs. Kenny Omega for the IWGP United States Heavyweight Championship on Night 1 of Wrestle Kingdom 17
United States/Canada MVP	Cody Rhodes
Japan MVP	Will Ospreay
Mexico MVP	Místico
Europe MVP	Will Ospreay
Danny Hodge Memorial Award (Non-Heavyweight MVP)	El Hijo del Vikingo
Women's Wrestler MVP	Rhea Ripley
Best Box Office Draw	Roman Reigns
Feud of the Year	Kevin Owens and Sami Zayn vs. The Bloodline
Most Improved	Julia Hart
Most Charismatic	MJF
Bryan Danielson Award (Best Technical Wrestler)	Bryan Danielson
Bruiser Brody Award (Best Brawler)	Jon Moxley
Best Flying Wrestler	El Hijo del Vikingo
Most Overrated	Sanada
Most Underrated	Chad Gable
Rookie of the Year	Yuma Anzai
Best Non-Wrestler	Don Callis
Best Teleivision Announcer	Excalibur
Worst Television Announcer	Booker T
Best Major Wrestling Show	Revolution
Worst Major Wrestling Show	Crown Jewel
Best Wrestling Maneuver	Hidden Blade (Will Ospreay)
Most Disgusting Promotional Tactic	WWE enabling Vince McMahon and him being back in power, and TKO keeping him in a position of power.
Worst Television Show	NWA Powerrr
Worst Match of the Year	Bray Wyatt vs. LA Knight in a "Mountain Dew Pitch Black match" at Royal Rumble
Worst Feud of the Year	MJF vs. "The Devil" (Adam Cole)
Worst Promotion of the Year	National Wrestling Alliance
Best Booker	Paul Levesque
Promoter of the Year	Nick Khan
Best Gimmick	"Timeless" Toni Storm
Worst Gimmick	"The Devil" (Adam Cole)
Best Pro Wrestling Book	The Last Real World Champion: The Legacy of "Nature Boy" Ric Flair by Tim Hornbreaker
Best Pro Wrestling DVD/Streaming Documentary	Dark Side of the Ring: Chris and Tammy

=== WWE ===
==== WWE Hall of Fame ====
Category	Inductee	Inducted by
Individual	Rey Mysterio	Konnan
Individual	The Great Muta	Ric Flair
Individual	Stacy Keibler	Mick Foley and Torrie Wilson
Celebrity	Andy Kaufman	Jerry "The King" Lawler and Jimmy Hart
Warrior Award	Tim White	The APA (John "Bradshaw" Layfield and Ron Simmons)

==== WWE Match of the Year ====
Winner	Event	Date
Roman Reigns (c) vs. Cody Rhodes for the Undisputed WWE Universal Championship	WrestleMania 39 (Night 2)	April 2, 2023

==== NXT Year-End Awards ====
Award	Winner
Male Superstar of the Year	Ilja Dragunov
Female Superstar of the Year	Tiffany Stratton
Tag Team of the Year	The Creed Brothers (Brutus and Julius Creed)
Moment of the Year	The Undertaker appears on NXT (October 10)
Match of the Year	Carmelo Hayes (c) vs. Ilja Dragunov for the NXT Championship at No Mercy

== Debuts ==
- January 4 – HIMAWARI (TJPW)
- January 6 – Oba Femi
- January 29 – Aiki
- February 19 – Tank
- February 21 – Luca Crusifino
- March 3 – Azusa Inaba
- March 6 – Toga (TJPW) and Shino Suzuki (TJPW)
- March 11 – Kelani Jordan and Karmen Petrovic
- March 18 – Haru Kazashiro
- March 19 – Amu Yumesaki (Ice Ribbon)
- March 24 – Trey Bearhill (NXT)
- March 25 –
  - Hanako
  - Komomo Minami (postponed)
  - Aya Sakura
- March 31 – Chi Chi, ZONES and Sunny (Evolution)
- April 1 – Riara (Ganbare Pro)
- April 2 – Kizuna Tanaka and Honoka (Wave) and Oleg Boltin (NJPW)
- April 28 – Houston Miller (NXT)
- May 5 – Riara, Haru Kazashiro (TJPW) and Runa Okubo (TJPW)
- May 12 – Tyson Dupont (NXT) and Tyriek Igwe (NXT)
- May 13 – Beau Morris (NXT), Hayden Pittman (NXT), Skylor Clinton (NXT) and Jasper Troy
- May 14 – Chairo, Yuzuki, Kento Kiryu, Samus and Yohei Sato.
- May 19 – Izzi Dame
- May 28 – Ryoya Tanaka (Dragon Gate)
- July 7 – Antione Frazier (NXT)
- July 17 – Yu Owada (Noah)
- July 30 – Gable Steveson
- August 9 – Yuna
- August 19 – Andrzej Hughes-Murray (NXT)
- August 22 – Layla Diggs (NXT)
- August 26 – Asuka Fujitaki, Mifu Ashida, Nanae Furukawa, Yuuki Minami, Mayuka Koike and Yuu Hanaya (Ice Ribbon)
- September 13: Wrestlers debuts on Netflix, documenting Ohio Valley Wrestling.
- September 23 – Carlee Bright (NXT)
- October 27 – Anna Keefer (NXT), Emma Maria Diaz (NXT) and Olena Sandovska (NXT)
- November 11 - Lainey Reid (NXT)
- November 17 – Yuzuki and Drake Stewart (NXT)
- November 20 – Shoma Kato (NJPW)
- November 21 – Katsuya Murashima (NJPW)
- December 11 – Chris Danger
- December 25 –
  - Sayaka Kurara
  - Ranna Yagami

== Retirements ==
- January 14 – Jinny (2015–2023)
- January 31 – Jerry Lawler (1970-2023)
- February 7 – Booker T (1986–2023)
- February 21 –
  - Keiji Mutoh (1984–2023)
  - Nosawa Rongai (1995–2023)
- March 9 – Daisuke Harada (2006–2023)
- May 14 – Himeka (2017–2023)
- August 19 – Drew Parker (2012–2023)
- August 26 – Tyrus (2006–2023)
- September 28 – Takuho Kato (2018–2023)
- November 12 – Saki Akai (2013–2023)
- December 28 – Riko Kaiju (2020–2023)

== Deaths ==
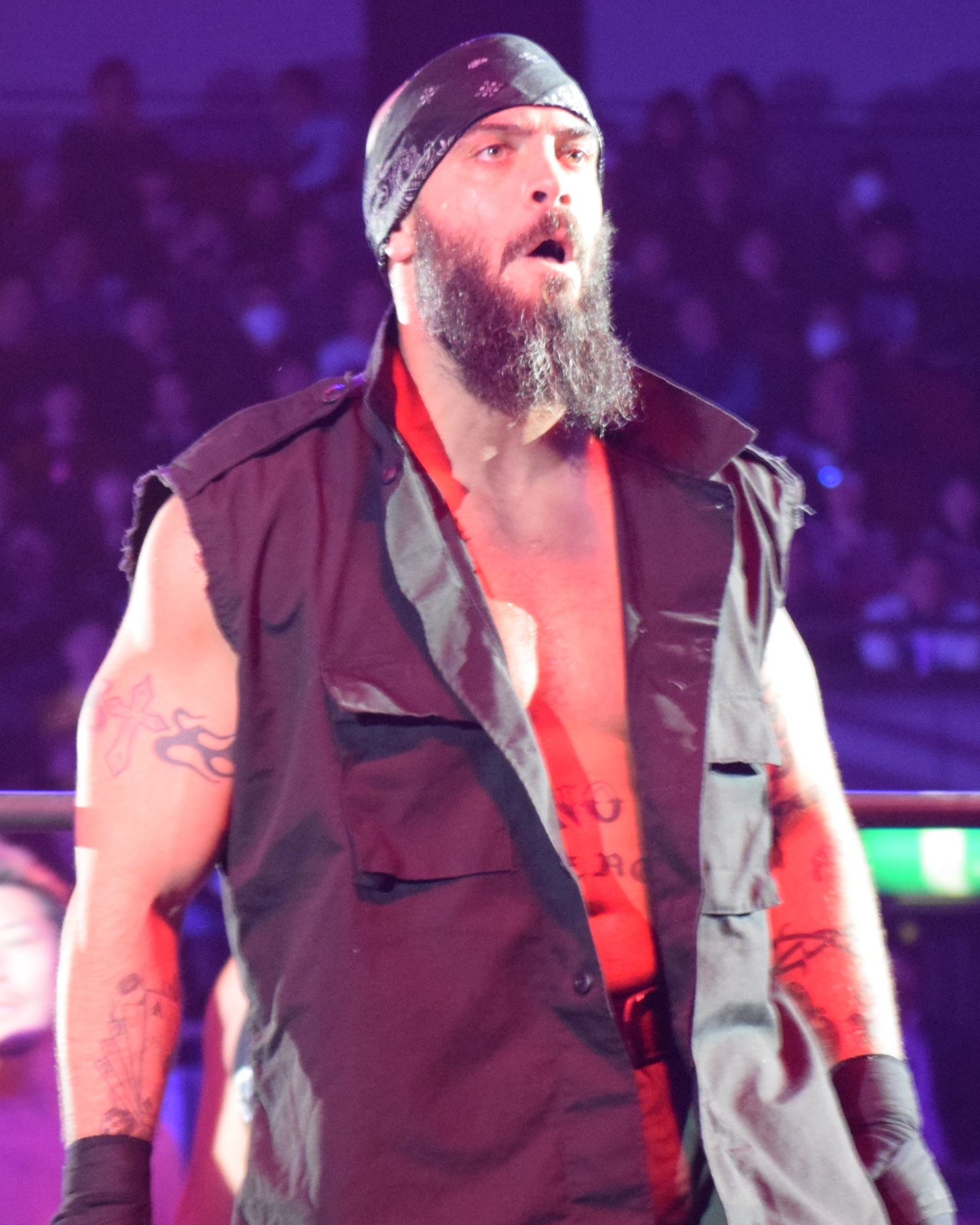
Jay Briscoe

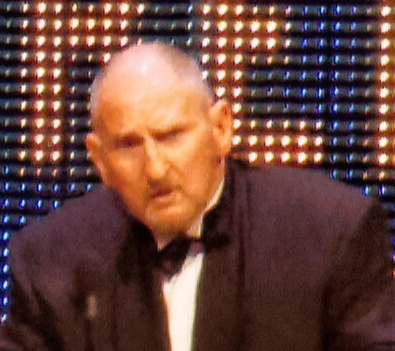
Bushwhacker Butch

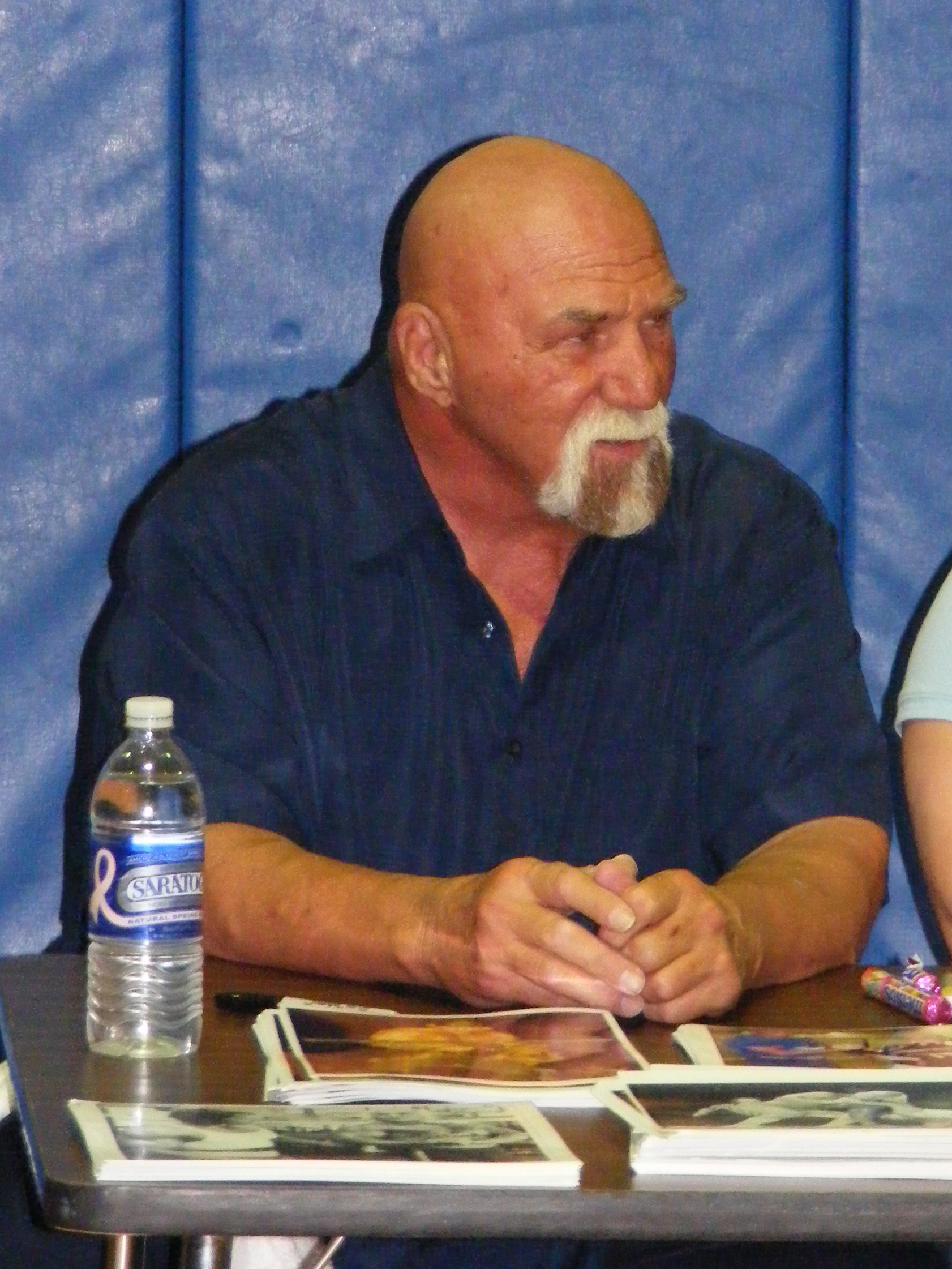
Superstar Billy Graham

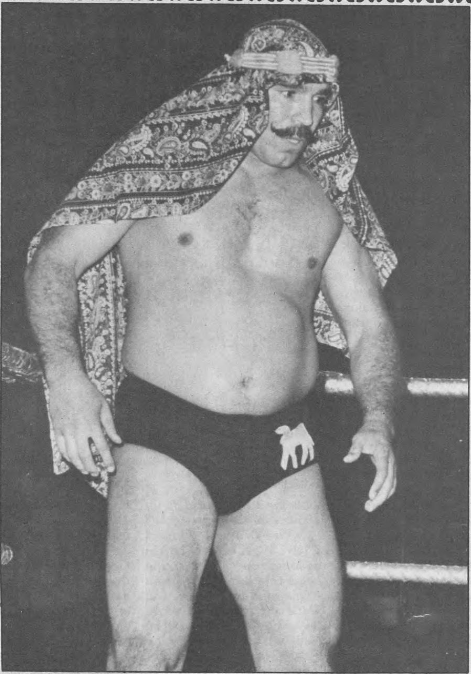
The Iron Sheik

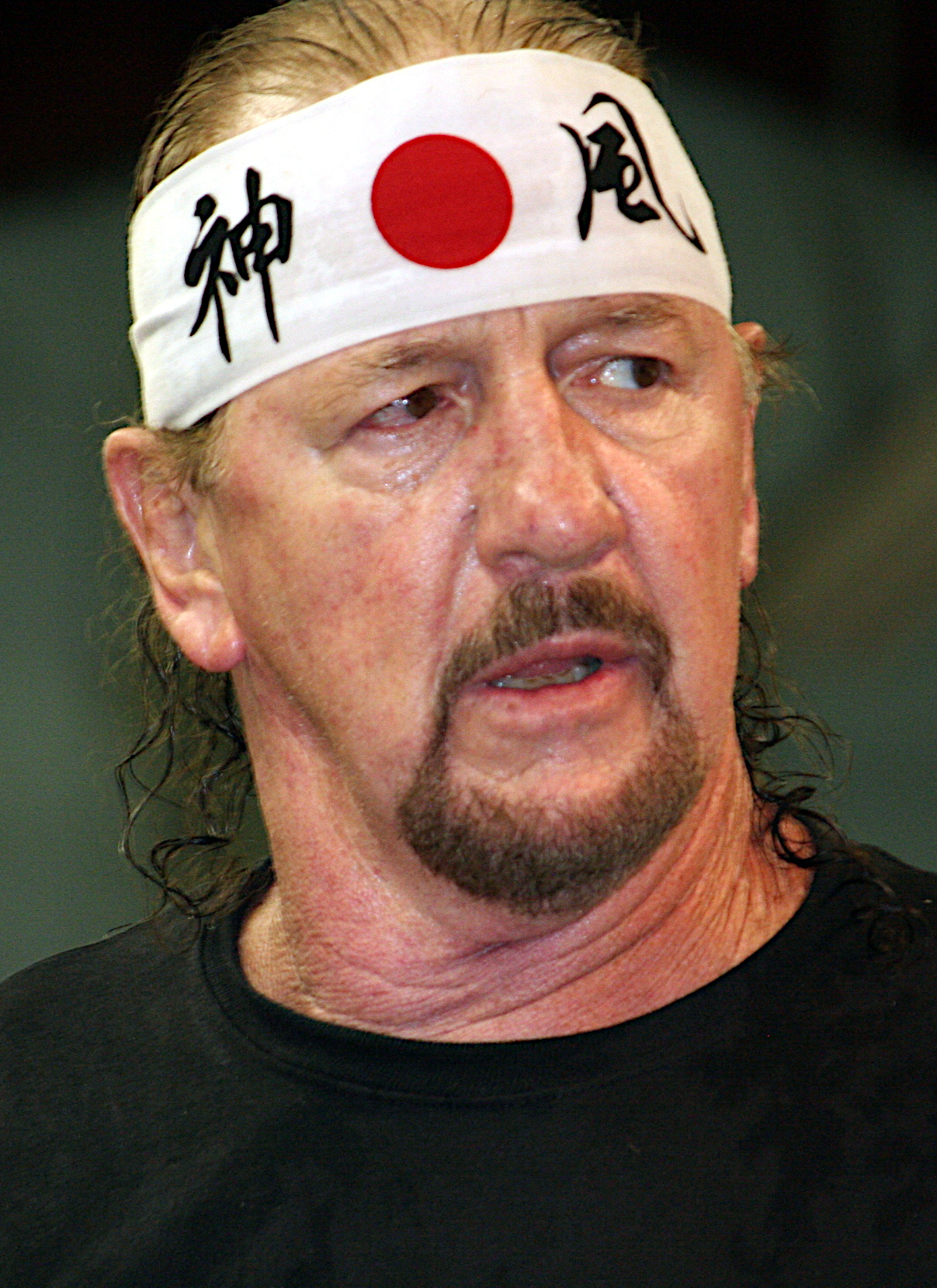
Terry Funk

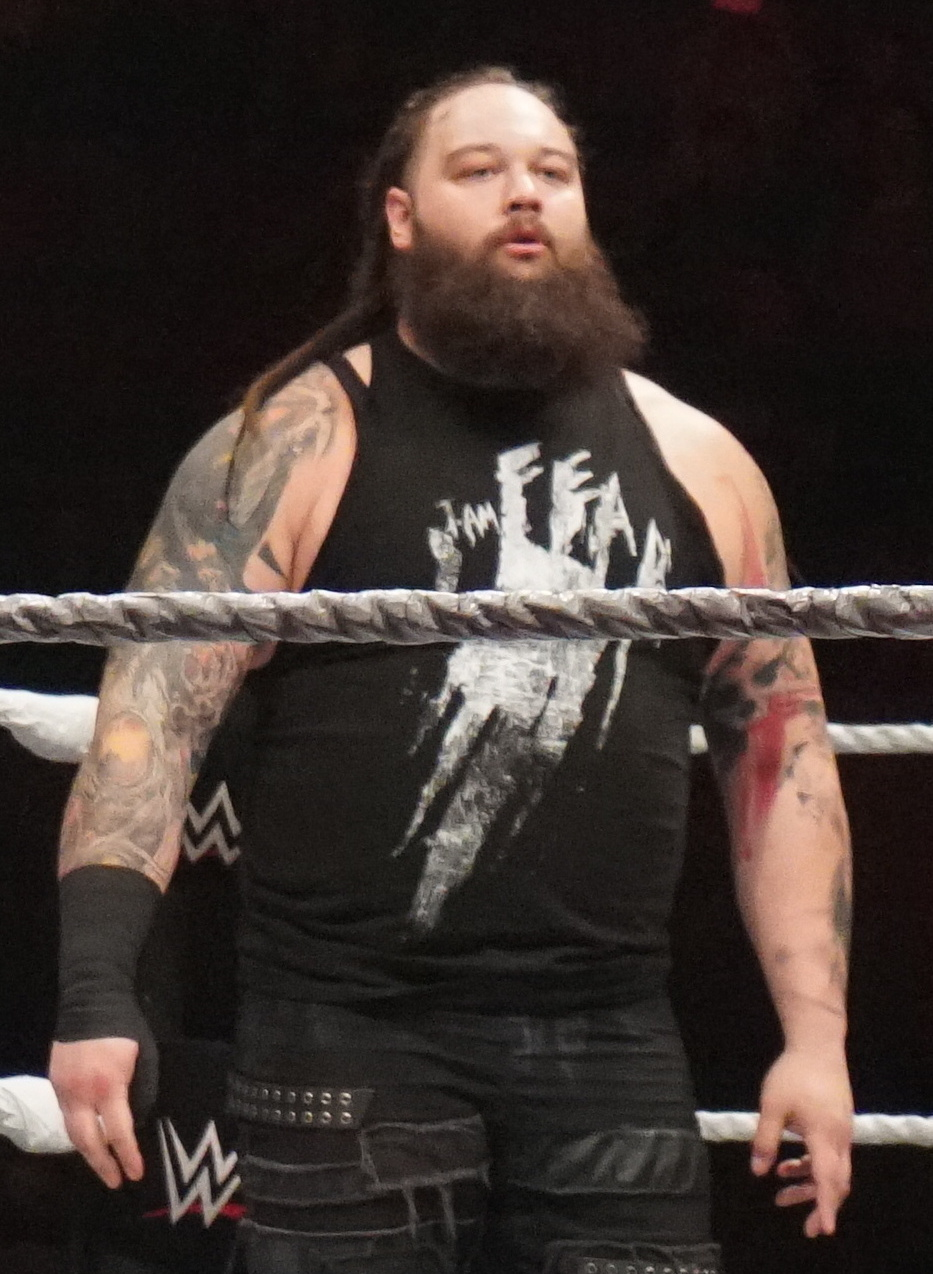
Bray Wyatt

- January 10 – Black Warrior (born 1969)
- January 17 –
  - Jay Briscoe (born 1984)
  - Rickin Sánchez (born 1935)
- February 2 –
  - Lanny Poffo (born 1954)
  - Kenny Jay (born 1937)
- February 6 – Charlie Norris (born 1965)
- February 11 – Erich Froelich (born 1937)
- February 12 – Billy Two Rivers (born 1935)
- February 14 – Jerry Jarrett (born 1942)
- March 15 – Jeff Gaylord (born 1958)
- March 17 – Sean Patrick O'Brien (born 1988)
- April 2 –
  - Max Crabtree (born 1933)
  - Bushwhacker Butch (born 1944)
- May 17 – Superstar Billy Graham (born 1943)
- May 22 – Peggy Lee Leather (born 1959)
- June 3 – Beverly Shade (born 1936)
- June 7 – The Iron Sheik (born 1942)
- June 30 – Droz (born 1969)
- July 11 – Mantaur (born 1968)
- July 25 – Tommy Seigler (born 1938)
- July 31 – Adrian Street (born 1940)
- August 14 – Rich Landrum (born 1946)
- August 21 – Abe Jacobs (born 1928)
- August 23 – Terry Funk (born 1944)
- August 24 – Bray Wyatt (born 1987)
- September 6 – Adnan Al-Kaissie (born 1939)
- September 8 – Brett Sawyer (born 1960)
- September 12 – Bart Sawyer (born 1965)
- September 17 – Emile Dupree (born 1936)
- September 29 – Joyce Grable (born 1952)
- October 1 – Russ Francis (born 1953)
- November 23 – Absolute Andy (born 1983)
- December 10 – Frank Wycheck (born 1971)
- December 11 –
  - Emily Matson (born 1981)
  - Osamu Kido (born 1950)
- December 25 – Jim Breaks (born 1940)
- December 29 –
  - Kurtis Chapman (born 1997)
  - Killer Khan (born 1947)

== See also ==
- List of WWE pay-per-view and WWE Network events, WWE Raw special episodes, WWE SmackDown special episodes, and WWE NXT special episodes
- List of AEW pay-per-view events, AEW special events, and AEW Dynamite special episodes
- List of Impact Wrestling pay-per-view events and Impact Plus Monthly Specials
- List of ROH pay-per-view events and Honor Club exclusive events
- List of NWA pay-per-view events and NWA Pop-Up Event
- List of MLW events
- List of major NJPW events and NJPW Strong special episodes
- List of major World Wonder Ring Stardom events
- List of major Pro Wrestling Noah events
- List of major DDT Pro-Wrestling events
- List of major Lucha Libre AAA Worldwide events
