= Dangan Yankies =

Professional wrestling stable

Stable
- Members: Masato Tanaka (leader); Yusaku Obata/Omatayuuchaku; Ikuto Hidaka; Fujita Hayato; Isami Kodaka; Yuko Miyamoto
- Name: Dangan Yankees
- Former members: Daichi Hashimoto; Takashi Sugiura
- Debut: December 17, 2013
- Years active: 2013–present

Dangan Yankies (弾丸ヤンキース, Dangan Yankīsu) is a professional wrestling stable in Pro Wrestling Zero1. It was originally formed by Masato Tanaka, Yusaku Obata, and Daichi Hashimoto. Other members have included Ikuto Hidaka, Fujita Hayato, Takashi Sugiura, Isami Kodaka, and Yuko Miyamoto.

== History ==
=== Pro Wrestling Zero1 ===
On December 17, 2013 after the team of Daemon Ueda and Yusaku Obata won the Furinkazan 2013, Ueda turned on Obata. Subsequently, Obata and Masato Tanaka formed an alliance, and Daichi Hashimoto also joined them to form a stable. On January 1, 2014 Obata and Tanaka received an opportunity for the NWA Intercontinental Tag Team Championship but they lost to KAMIKAZE and Shinjiro Otani. On January 11 they started a feud with Daemon Ueda's stable Daemon-Gun. Five days later Ikuto Hidaka joined the stable. On January 29 Ikuto Hidaka, Masato Tanaka and Yusaku Obata defeated Kohei Sato, Ryouji Sai and Shinjiro Otani. After the match, they invited Yoshikazu Yokoyama to join the group but he refused. However, it was announced that Hidaka's friend Fujita Hayato and Takashi Sugiura had joined the stable. On February 27 Isami Kodaka and Yuko Miyamoto joined the stable, and they also revealed the name of the stable as Dangan Yankees.

On March 18 Obata was defeated in a match by Daemon Ueda and because of match stipulations, changed his name to Omatayuuchaku. On March 30 Hayato and Hidaka failed to capture the NWA International Lightweight Tag Team Championship in a three-way tag team match. On April 8, while Hashimoto was recovering from a broken jaw, Zero1 announced that his contract with the promotion had expired, and he had decided not to re-sign, therefore leaving the stable.

On May 6, Tanaka and Sugiura won the NWA Intercontinental Tag Team Championship. On June 1 Tanaka and Sugiura made their first successful title defense by defeating Daisuke Sekimoto and Kazuki Hashimoto. On September 14 Hidaka received an opportunity for the International Junior Heavyweight Championship and the NWA World Junior Heavyweight Championship in a three-way match, but he lost to winner Jason Lee. On September 21 Hidaka and Mineo Fujita lost a match for the NWA International Lightweight Tag Team Championship to the champions Takuya Sugawara and "brother" Yasshi. In December, Tanaka and Sugiura won the 2014 tournament.

On February 2, 2015 Tanaka lost a match for the World Heavyweight Championship against Kohei Sato. On May 5 Hidaka had another chance for the International Junior Heavyweight and the NWA World Junior Heavyweight Championship but he lost to the champion Minoru Tanaka. On June 7 Tanaka and Sugiura lost the titles to Kohei Sato and Shinjiro Otani in their seventh title defense. The same night, Obata had a chance for the NWA United National Heavyweight Championship but he lost to the champion KAMIKAZE. From July 16 to August 2, 2015 Obata, Tanaka and Hayato participated at the 2015 Fire Festival but after the first match against Tanaka, Hayato was forced to pull out of the tournament with a knee injury, forfeiting the rest of his matches.

On January 1, 2016 Tanaka had a shot for the World Heavyweight title but he lost to the champion Hideki Suzuki. On April 7 Hidaka and Hayato defeated Shinjiro Otani and Tatsuhito Takaiwa to win the NWA International Lightweight Tag Team Titles. On May 6 Tanaka and James Raideen defeated Daisuke Sekimoto and Kohei Sato to win the NWA Intercontinental Tag Team Titles. On July 8 to July 31 Obata, defeated Shinjiro Otani to win the Fire Festival 2016. On November 30 Hidaka and Hayato lost NWA International Lightweight Tag Team Champions in a Pro-Wrestling Basara event to Kodaka and Takumi Tsukamoto. On December 18, Yusaku Obata and Kai defeated Akebono and Shogun Okamoto in the finals to win 2016 Furinkazan Tag Tournament.

=== Pro Wrestling Noah ===
On February 22, 2014 Tanaka and Sugiura defeated Brave (Naomichi Marufuji and Atsushi Kotoge) in their tag team debut in Pro Wrestling Noah. On April 27, the two defeated Katsuhiko Nakajima and Naomichi Marufuji to win the 2014 Global Tag League. On May 31, Tanaka and Sugiura became double champions, when they defeated Maybach Taniguchi and Takeshi Morishima for Noah's GHC Tag Team Championship. On October 18 to November 8 Sugiura won the 2014 Global League, but he failed to win the GHC Heavyweight Championship from Naomichi Marufuji. In addition, Tokyo Sports named Dangan Yankies the 2014 tag team of the year. They lost the GHC Tag Team Championship to TMDK (Mikey Nicholls and Shane Haste) on January 10, 2015.

On May 4, Tanaka and Sugiura won their second Global Tag League in a row. On May 10 they failed to regain the GHC Tag Team Champions losing to K.E.S. (Lance Archer and Davey Boy Smith Jr.) due to an interference by Shelton X Benjamin. Both Tanaka and Sugiura participated at Global League 2015 but both failed to advanced to the finals. On December 23 Sugiura left the stable after he turned on Noah and joined the villainous Suzuki-gun stable.

== Championships and accomplishments ==
- Michinoku Pro Wrestling
  - Tohoku Tag Team Championship (1 time) Hidaka with Minoru Fujita
  - UWA World Tag Team Championship (1 time) Hidaka with Minoru Fujita
- Pro Wrestling Noah
  - GHC Tag Team Championship (1 time) - Takashi Sugiura and Masato Tanaka
  - Global Tag League (2014, 2015) - Sugiura and Tanaka
  - Global League (2014) - Sugiura
- Pro Wrestling Zero1
  - NWA Intercontinental Tag Team Championship (2 times, current) - Sugiura (1) and Tanaka (1), Tanaka and James Raideen (1 time, current)
  - NWA International Lightweight Tag Team Championship (2 times, current) - Hayato and Hidaka (1) and Kodaka and Takumi Tsukamoto (1, current)
  - Furinkazan (2014) - Tanaka and Sugiura
  - Tenkaichi Jr. (2015) - Hidaka
  - Fire Festival (2016) - Obata
  - Furinkazan (2016) - Obata with Kai
- Tokyo Sports
  - Best Tag Team Award (2014) – Tanaka and Sugiura
