= Kamikaze (wrestler) =

Japanese professional wrestler

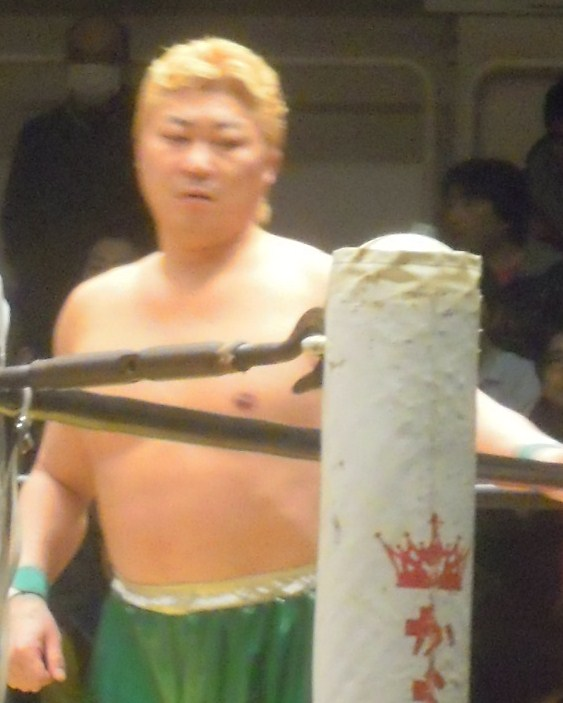
- Kamikaze in February 2013

Personal information
- Born: November 1, 1971 (age 54) Ashikaga, Japan

Professional wrestling career
- Ring name(s): 150% Machine; Aniki "GK"; Kamikaze; KAMIKAZE; Kuro Kaiser; Matsuyama; Monster °C; Tengu Kaiser
- Billed height: 185 cm (6 ft 1 in)
- Billed weight: 115 kg (254 lb)
- Debut: 1993

Shoichi Maruyama (丸山 昭一, Maruyama Shōichi), better known by his ring name Kamikaze (sometimes stylized in capital letters as KAMIKAZE), is a Japanese professional wrestler currently working as a freelancer. He is best known for his tenure with the Japanese promotions Pro Wrestling Zero1 and Big Japan Pro Wrestling (BJW).

== Professional wrestling career ==
=== Big Japan Pro Wrestling (1998–2002) ===
Maruyama competed in various signature events for the promotion, making his debut in the inaugural Saikyo Tag League in 1999; teaming with Shunme Matsuzaki, he scored two points in matches against the teams of Tomoaki Honma and Ryuji Yamakawa, Shadow WX and The Winger, and Mike Samples and Jun Kasai. At the 2000 edition, he teamed with Abdullah Kobayashi in Block A; the duo failed to score any points after losing to Abdullah the Butcher and Shadow WX, Men's Teioh and Daisuke Sekimoto, and Daikokubo Benkei and Shunme Matsuzaki. At the 2001 edition, he teamed with Hideki Hosaka and scored five points against the teams of Fantastik and Ryuji Ito, Men's Teioh and Daisuke Sekimoto, Abdullah Kobayashi and Daikokubo Benkei, and Masato Tanaka and Shunme Matsuzaki.

Maruyama also competed in a variety of different tournaments hosted by BJW. Between March 18 and 20, 2001, he took part in a tournament to determine the first ever BJW Heavyweight Champion, which he won after defeating Mad Man Pondo in the quarterfinals, Wifebeater in the semifinals, and John Zandig in the finals. A week later, he competed in a tournament for the vacant BJW Deathmatch Heavyweight Championship, defeating Jun Kasai in the first round before losing to Justice Pain in the quarterfinals. At the 2001 Six-Man Maximum Tag League, he teamed with Hideki Hosaka and Shunme Matsuzaki to win the tournament, topping the single block with five points after facing the Men's Club (Men's Teioh, Daisuke Sekimoto, and Ryuji Ito); Jun Kasai, Mad Man Pondo, and Ruckus; and the Skinheads (Daikokubo Benkei, Abdullah Kobayashi, and Naoki Numazawa).

=== Pro Wrestling Zero1 (2002–2018) ===
Maruyama made his debut in Pro Wrestling Zero1 on the second night of the ZERO-ONE Creation 2002 from June 29, where he teamed up with Yoshiaki Fujiwara to defeat Rapid Fire and Steve Corino in a tag team match. During his sixteen-year tenure with the company, he became a one-time World Heavyweight Champion, a two-time United National Heavyweight Champion, and a three-time NWA Intercontinental Tag Team Champion with two different partners. However, he has also competed for other titles, such as the vacant All Asia Tag Team Championship at ZERO-ONE Rebel Z 2003 on December 25, where he teamed up with Jun Kasai to unsuccessfully challenge Mr. Gannosuke and Tetsuhiro Kuroda for them.

He frequently competed in the promotion's signature Fire Festival tournament, debuting in the 2008 edition. Placed in Block A, he scored two points with matches against Togi Makabe, Masaaki Mochizuki, Shinjiro Otani, and Kohei Sato. At the 2012 edition, he placed himself in Block B, where he scored a total of two points after going against Masato Tanaka, Daisuke Sekimoto, Kohei Sato and Muhammad Yone. At the 2015 edition, he was placed in Block A, scoring six points after wrestling Kohei Sato, Masato Tanaka, Yusaku Obata, Fujita Hayato, and Masakado. At the 2016 edition, he scored a total of fifteen points in the only active block after going against Shinjiro Otani, Yusaku Obata, Masato Tanaka, Ryota Hama, James Raideen, Kohei Sato, Shogun Okamoto, Hayato Fujita and Buffa.

At the inaugural Furinkazan tournament in 2009, he teamed with longtime partner Kohei Sato. Competing in Block B, they scored five points against the teams of Masato Tanaka and Masaaki Mochizuki, Shiro Koshinaka and Hajime Ohara, Rikiya Fudo and Shito Ueda, and Tsutomu Oosugi and Hercules Senga. He scored his best result at the 2010 edition in which he and Sato came out victorious by toppling the block A with eight points after outmatching the teams of Akebono and Shinjiro Otani, Phil Davis and Sean Davis, Hikaru Sato and Munenori Sawa, and Kintaro Kanemura and Takuya Sugawara. At the 2011 edition, he teamed up with Sato again in the block B and scored five points against Fujita Hayato and Masato Tanaka, Akebono and Daichi Hashimoto, Schwarz and Weiss, and Mineo Fujita and Shito Ueda. At the 2013 edition, he and Sato defeated Tank Nagai and Yoshikazu Yokoyama in the first round and advanced via a walkover in the second, before losing to Daisuke Sekimoto and Yuji Okabayashi in the third round. At the 2014 edition, Maruyama teamed up with Daemon Ueda to defeat Atsushi Onita and Masashi Aoyagi in the first rounds and then fell short to Masato Tanaka and Takashi Sugiura in the second ones. At the 2016 edition, he teamed again with Kohei Sato and fell short to Kai and Yusaku Obata in the first rounds.

=== New Japan Pro Wrestling (1994, 2005–2008) ===
Maruyama made sporadic appearances for New Japan Pro Wrestling, beginning with the NJPW Super Grade Tag League IV tournament in October 1994. Teaming with Masayoshi Motegi, he failed to score any points after losses to the teams of El Samurai and 2 Cold Scorpio, Black Tiger and The Great Sasuke, Super Delfin and Taka Michinoku, Shinjiro Otani and Wild Pegasus, Gran Hamada and Norio Honaga, and Dean Malenko and Tokimitsu Ishizawa. At NJPW Toukon Souzou New Chapter on October 8, 2005, he teamed with Kohei Sato, Ryouji Sai, and Shinjiro Otani in an eight-man tag team match, losing to Hiroyoshi Tenzan, Naofumi Yamamoto, Takashi Iizuka, and Yutaka Yoshie. At Toukon Shidou Chapter 1 on January 4, 2006, he teamed up with Daisuke Sekimoto, Kohei Sato, Riki Choshu, Takashi Uwano and Yoshihito Sasaki to defeat Hirooki Goto, Hiroshi Nagao, Osamu Nishimura, Takashi Iizuka, Tatsumi Fujinami and Toru Yano in a Twelve-man tag team match. At NJPW Lock Up on February 24, 2008, he teamed up with Yoshihito Sasaki in a losing effort against Great Bash Heel (Togi Makabe and Toru Yano).

== Championships and accomplishments ==
- Apache Pro-Wrestling Army
  - WEW World Tag Team Championship (1 time) – with Kohei Sato
- Big Japan Pro Wrestling
  - BJW Heavyweight Championship (1 time, inaugural)
  - BJW Tag Team Championship (2 times) – with Shunme Matsuzaki (1) and Abdullah Kobayashi (1)
  - Six Man Maximum Tag League (1998, 2001)
- Pro Wrestling Illustrated
  - Ranked No. 428 of the top 500 singles wrestlers in the PWI 500 in 2010
- Pro Wrestling Zero1
  - World Heavyweight Championship (1 time)
  - United National Heavyweight Championship (2 times)
  - NWA Intercontinental Tag Team Championship (3 times) – with Kohei Sato (2) and Shinjiro Otani (1)
  - Furinkazan (2010) – with Kohei Sato
