= Fire Festival =

Annual professional wrestling tournament

2006 winner Masato Tanaka hoisting the ceremonial Fire Sword

The Himatsuri (Japanese: 火祭り) is an annual professional wrestling round-robin tournament held by Pro Wrestling Zero1 to determine the top wrestler in the promotion, typically contested between July and August. Within the English-speaking professional wrestling world, the tournament is commonly referred to by its translated name Fire Festival.

Though it has sometimes been held as a single pool tournament, the tournament usually – and currently – features two pools of wrestlers, with the winner of each pool facing off in a final match to decide that year's winner. The winner of the tournament is presented with the "Fire Sword", which they carry for the following year until the next Festival.

In its current format, the tournament lasts four weeks. The winner of each pool is determined by a points system; five points for a victory by pinfall, submission, knockout or forfeit, four points for a win by countout, disqualification or technical knockout, three points for a draw, and zero points for a loss or no contest. Under the current format, double decisions (such as double count-outs or double disqualifications) are treated as draws.

In addition to Zero1 members, the tournament has frequently included outside stars, including 2003 winner Satoshi Kojima, Kensuke Sasaki and Taka Michinoku.

== Tournaments ==
Year	Winner	Won	Participants
2001	Shinjiro Otani	1	8
2002	Shinjiro Otani	2	10
2003	Satoshi Kojima	1	10
2004	Kohei Sato	1	10
2005	Shinjiro Otani	3	10
2006	Masato Tanaka	1	10
2007	Masato Tanaka	2	10
2008	Masato Tanaka	3	10
2009	Ryouji Sai	1	10
2010	Shinjiro Otani	4	10
2011	Daisuke Sekimoto	1	10
2012	Masato Tanaka	4	10
2013	James Raideen	1	12
2014	Ryouji Sai	2	12
2015	Kohei Sato	2	12
2016	Yusaku Obata	1	10
2017	Masato Tanaka	5	10
2018	Yuko Miyamoto	1	14
2019	Yuji Hino	1	14
2020	Hartley Jackson	1	14
2021	Takuya Sugawara	1	12
2022	Daisuke Sekimoto	2	12
2023	Junya Matsunaga	1	12
2024	Tsugutaka Sato	1	12
2025	Hayabusa	1	12
2026	TBD	TBD	12

== Results ==
=== 2001 ===
The 2001 Fire Festival was held from September 1 to September 15, over three weekly events on September 1, 8 and 15; four tournament matches were held at each, including the final on September 15.

Final standings
Block A		Block B	
Shinjiro Otani	6	Kohei Sato	4
Horshu	4	Samoa Joe	4
Sean McCully	2	Masato Tanaka	3
Daisuke Sekimoto	0	George Takano	1

Block A	Horshu	Sean McCully	Shinjiro Otani	Daisuke Sekimoto
Horshu	X	Horshu (Forf)	Otani (8:32)	Horshu (4:53)
Sean McCully	Horshu (Forf)	X	Otani (3:08)	McCully (3:49)
Shinjiro Otani	Otani (8:32)	Otani (3:08)	X	Otani (11:29)
Daisuke Sekimoto	Horshu (4:53)	McCully (3:49)	Otani (11:29)	X
Block B	Kohei Sato	Samoa Joe	George Takano	Masato Tanaka
Kohei Sato	X	Sato (8:25)	Sato (7:21)	Tanaka (8:56)
Samoa Joe	Sato (8:25)	X	Joe (5:24)	Joe (8:00)
George Takano	Sato (7:21)	Joe (5:24)	X	Draw (9:28)
Masato Tanaka	Tanaka (8:56)	Joe (8:00)	Draw (9:28)	X

Final
A1	Shinjiro Otani	Sub
B1	Kohei Sato	13:05

=== 2002 ===
The 2002 Fire Festival expanded the tournament to include 10 participants, and was held from July 28 to August 4 over five shows, each featuring four tournament matches.

Final standings
Block A		Block B	
Shinjiro Otani	6	Tetsuhiro Kuroda	6
Masato Tanaka	5	Yuki Ishikawa	4
Taka Michinoku	4	Steve Corino	4
Kintaro Kanemura	3	Hirotaka Yokoi	4
King Joe	2	Kohei Sato	2

Block A	Kintaro Kanemura	King Joe	Taka Michinoku	Shinjiro Otani	Masato Tanaka
Kintaro Kanemura	X	Joe (6:09)	Kanemura (9:55)	Otani (0:03)	Draw (15:49)
King Joe	Joe (6:09)	X	TAKA (6:38)	Otani (7:15)	Tanaka (9:24)
Taka Michinoku	Kanemura (9:55)	TAKA (6:38)	X	Otani (15:11)	TAKA (7:57)
Shinjiro Otani	Otani (0:03)	Otani (7:15)	Otani (15:11)	X	Tanaka (14:06)
Masato Tanaka	Draw (15:49)	Tanaka (9:24)	TAKA (7:57)	Tanaka (14:06)	X
Block B	Steve Corino	Yuki Ishikawa	Tetsuhiro Kuroda	Kohei Sato	Hirotaka Yokoi
Steve Corino	X	Ishikawa (9:02)	Kuroda (9:46)	Corino (9:56)	Corino (7:17)
Yuki Ishikawa	Ishikawa (9:02)	X	Kuroda (11:52)	Sato (6:53)	Ishikawa (8:43)
Tetsuhiro Kuroda	Kuroda (9:46)	Kuroda (11:52)	X	Kuroda (7:42)	Yokoi (8:45)
Kohei Sato	Corino (9:56)	Sato (6:53)	Kuroda (7:42)	X	Yokoi (7:02)
Hirotaka Yokoi	Corino (7:17)	Ishikawa (8:43)	Yokoi (8:45)	Yokoi (7:02)	X

Final
A1	Shinjiro Otani	Pin
B1	Tetsuhiro Kuroda	17:53

=== 2003 ===
The 2003 Fire Festival was held from July 25 to August 1, with four matches on July 27 being contested in All Japan Pro Wrestling. The winner, Satoshi Kojima, is to date the only "outsider" to win the Fire Festival, representing AJPW.

Final standings
Block A		Block B	
Shinjiro Otani	5	Satoshi Kojima	6
Arashi	4	Masato Tanaka	5
Hirotaka Yokoi	4	Tetsuhiro Kuroda	4
Kintaro Kanemura	4	Alexander Otsuka	3
Yoshiaki Fujiwara	3	Kohei Sato	2

Block A	Arashi	Yoshiaki Fujiwara	Kintaro Kanemura	Shinjiro Otani	Hirotaka Yokoi
Arashi	X	Fujiwara (5:01)	Kanemura (4:50)	Arashi (14:53)	Arashi (9:24)
Yoshiaki Fujiwara	Fujiwara (5:01)	X	Kanemura (7:54)	Draw (11:24)	Yokoi (6:51)
Kintaro Kanemura	Kanemura (4:50)	Kanemura (7:54)	X	Otani (10:38)	Yokoi (7:21)
Shinjiro Otani	Arashi (14:53)	Draw (11:24)	Otani (10:38)	X	Otani (6:48)
Hirotaka Yokoi	Arashi (9:24)	Yokoi (6:51)	Yokoi (7:21)	Otani (6:48)	X
Block B	Satoshi Kojima	Tetsuhiro Kuroda	Alexander Otsuka	Kohei Sato	Masato Tanaka
Satoshi Kojima	X	Kojima (12:52)	Otsuka (12:46)	Kojima (12:34)	Kojima (26:05)
Tetsuhiro Kuroda	Kojima (12:52)	X	Kuroda (9:03)	Kuroda (10:36)	Tanaka (8:07)
Alexander Otsuka	Otsuka (12:46)	Kuroda (9:03)	X	Sato (7:51)	Draw (9:18)
Kohei Sato	Kojima (12:34)	Kuroda (10:36)	Sato (7:51)	X	Tanaka (11:57)
Masato Tanaka	Kojima (26:05)	Tanaka (8:07)	Draw (9:18)	Tanaka (11:57)	X

Final
A1	Shinjiro Otani	Pin
B1	Satoshi Kojima	20:19

=== 2004 ===
The 2004 Fire Festival was held from July 27 to August 1, over five shows.

Final standings
Block A		Block B	
Takao Omori	5	Kohei Sato	6
Satoshi Kojima	5	Shiro Koshinaka	5
Wataru Sakata	4	Shinjiro Otani	4
Hirotaka Yokoi	3	Kintaro Kanemura	3
Tetsuhiro Kuroda	3	Masato Tanaka	2

Block A	Satoshi Kojima	Tetsuhiro Kuroda	Takao Omori	Wataru Sakata	Hirotaka Yokoi
Satoshi Kojima	X	Draw (13:02)	Omori (19:06)	Kojima (14:52)	Kojima (14:35)
Tetsuhiro Kuroda	Draw (13:02)	X	Kuroda (11:16)	Sakata (15:10)	Yokoi (11:10)
Takao Omori	Omori (19:06)	Kuroda (11:16)	X	Omori (7:17)	Draw (30:00)
Wataru Sakata	Kojima (14:52)	Sakata (15:10)	Omori (7:17)	X	Sakata (9:50)
Hirotaka Yokoi	Kojima (14:35)	Yokoi (11:10)	Draw (30:00)	Sakata (9:50)	X
Block B	Kintaro Kanemura	Shiro Koshinaka	Shinjiro Otani	Kohei Sato	Masato Tanaka
Kintaro Kanemura	X	Draw (5:34)	Kanemura (1:18)	Sato (9:14)	Tanaka (11:07)
Shiro Koshinaka	Draw (5:34)	X	Otani (10:56)	Koshinaka (8:32)	Koshinaka (Forf)
Shinjiro Otani	Kanemura (1:18)	Otani (10:56)	X	Sato (17:32)	Otani (Forf)
Kohei Sato	Sato (9:14)	Koshinaka (8:32)	Sato (17:32)	X	Sato (Forf)
Masato Tanaka	Tanaka (11:07)	Koshinaka (Forf)	Otani (Forf)	Sato (Forf)	X

Final
A1	Takao Omori	Pin
B1	Kohei Sato	22:04

=== 2005 ===
The 2005 Fire Festival was held from July 29 to August 7, over five shows.

Final standings
Block A		Block B	
Shinjiro Otani	5	Kensuke Sasaki	6
Tadao Yasuda	4	Hirotaka Yokoi	4
Masato Tanaka	4	Takao Omori	4
Daisuke Ikeda	4	Chris the Bambikiller	4
Kohei Sato	3	Ryouji Sai	3

Block A	Daisuke Ikeda	Shinjiro Otani	Kohei Sato	Masato Tanaka	Tadao Yasuda
Daisuke Ikeda	X	Draw (30:00)	Draw (6:50)	Tanaka (9:03)	Ikeda (5:57)
Shinjiro Otani	Draw (30:00)	X	Otani (13:39)	Tanaka (17:11)	Otani (10:49)
Kohei Sato	Draw (6:50)	Otani (13:39)	X	Sato (12:47)	Yasuda (7:18)
Masato Tanaka	Tanaka (9:03)	Tanaka (17:11)	Sato (12:47)	X	Yasuda (7:46)
Tadao Yasuda	Ikeda (5:57)	Otani (10:49)	Yasuda (7:18)	Yasuda (7:46)	X
Block B	Chris the Bambikiller	Takao Omori	Ryouji Sai	Kensuke Sasaki	Hirotaka Yokoi
Chris the Bambikiller	X	Omori (8:03)	Chris (14:13)	Chris (7:46)	Yokoi (10:46)
Takao Omori	Omori (8:03)	X	Omori (20:03)	Sasaki (22:51)	Yokoi (6:15)
Ryouji Sai	Chris (14:13)	Omori (20:03)	X	Sasaki (12:06)	Sai (11:41)
Kensuke Sasaki	Chris (7:46)	Sasaki (22:51)	Sasaki (12:06)	X	Sasaki (10:44)
Hirotaka Yokoi	Yokoi (10:46)	Yokoi (6:15)	Sai (11:41)	Sasaki (10:44)	X

Final
A1	Shinjiro Otani	Pin
B1	Kensuke Sasaki	20:00

=== 2006 ===
The 2006 Fire Festival was held from July 20 to July 29, over six shows. Due to a tie for first place in Block A, a four-way elimination match was made on the night of the final to determine the winner of the block, with that man facing Block B winner Ryouji Sai later in the night. This would end up being Masato Tanaka, who also went on to defeat Sai and win the tournament. The top 4 in Block A are ranked below by order of elimination, with the first eliminated, Kazunari Murakami, ranked lowest.

Final standings
Block A		Block B	
Masato Tanaka	5	Ryouji Sai	6
Yutaka Yoshie	5	Takao Omori	5
Shinjiro Otani	5	Tatsutoshi Goto	4
Kazunari Murakami	5	Kohei Sato	3
Tomoaki Honma	0	Daisuke Sekimoto	2

Block A	Tomoaki Honma	Kazunari Murakami	Shinjiro Otani	Masato Tanaka	Yutaka Yoshie
Tomoaki Honma	X	Murakami (5:58)	Otani (11:57)	Tanaka (11:08)	Yoshie (10:41)
Kazunari Murakami	Murakami (5:58)	X	Murakami (9:15)	Tanaka (8:23)	Draw (11:18)
Shinjiro Otani	Otani (11:57)	Murakami (9:15)	X	Draw (30:00)	Otani (10:18)
Masato Tanaka	Tanaka (11:08)	Tanaka (8:23)	Draw (30:00)	X	Yoshie (11:27)
Yutaka Yoshie	Yoshie (10:41)	Draw (11:18)	Otani (10:18)	Yoshie (11:27)	X
Block B	Tatsutoshi Goto	Takao Omori	Ryouji Sai	Kohei Sato	Daisuke Sekimoto
Tatsutoshi Goto	X	Omori (7:29)	Goto (7:44)	Sato (6:42)	Goto (9:40)
Takao Omori	Omori (7:29)	X	Sai (14:20)	Draw (30:00)	Omori (11:50)
Ryouji Sai	Goto (7:44)	Sai (14:20)	X	Sai (12:18)	Sai (14:14)
Kohei Sato	Sato (6:42)	Draw (30:00)	Sai (12:18)	X	Sekimoto (14:06)
Daisuke Sekimoto	Goto (9:40)	Omori (11:50)	Sai (14:14)	Sekimoto (14:06)	X

Final
A1	Masato Tanaka	Pin
B1	Ryouji Sai	23:00

=== 2007 ===
The 2007 Fire Festival was held from July 16 to August 2, over nine shows. Four of the ten participants were determined by each winning a qualifying match on May 27. Four more were determined by fan voting, and the final two were outsiders handpicked by ZERO1-MAX. On July 20, it was announced that Ikuto Hidaka would be replacing Kazunari Murakami, who was forced out of action after just one match due to a head injury, due to finishing in fifth place in the fan vote. In a similar situation to the 2006 tournament, Block A ended in a full tie with four points, leading to a five-way match on August 2 to determine the finalist. The participants and schedule are as follows:

Current standings
Block A		Block B	
Ryouji Sai	4	Masato Tanaka	7
Ikuto Hidaka	4	Kohei Sato	6
Shinjiro Otani	4	Daisuke Sekimoto	3
Yutaka Yoshie	4	Yoshihito Sasaki	2
Akitoshi Saito	4	Takao Omori	2

Block A	Ikuto Hidaka	Shinjiro Otani	Ryouji Sai	Akitoshi Saito	Yutaka Yoshie
Ikuto Hidaka	X	Draw (14:22)^{1}	Sai (13:34)	Draw (12:08)	Hidaka (12:25)
Shinjiro Otani	Draw (14:22)^{1}	X	Sai (14:22)	Otani (11:55)	Draw (30:00)
Ryouji Sai	Sai (13:34)	Sai (14:22)	X	Saito (14:16)	Yoshie (14:29)
Akitoshi Saito	Draw (12:08)	Otani (11:55)	Saito (14:16)	X	Draw (30:00)
Yutaka Yoshie	Hidaka (12:25)	Draw (30:00)	Yoshie (14:29)	Draw (30:00)	X
Block A	Takao Omori	Yoshihito Sasaki	Kohei Sato	Daisuke Sekimoto	Masato Tanaka
Takao Omori	X	Sasaki (8:40)	Sato (15:21)	Omori (16:11)	Tanaka (14:57)
Yoshihito Sasaki	Sasaki (8:40)	X	Sato (12:11)	Sekimoto (15:25)	Tanaka (14:39)
Kohei Sato	Sato (15:21)	Sato (12:11)	X	Sato (12:30)	Tanaka (12:05)
Daisuke Sekimoto	Omori (16:11)	Sekimoto (15:25)	Sato (12:30)	X	Draw (30:00)
Masato Tanaka	Tanaka (14:57)	Tanaka (14:39)	Tanaka (12:05)	Draw (30:00)	X

Final
A1	Ryouji Sai	Pin
B1	Masato Tanaka	23:52

^{1}Kazunari Murakami wrestled this match; Hidaka was awarded the point upon replacing Murakami.

=== 2008 ===
The 2008 Fire Festival was held from July 27 to August 3 over six shows. It featured ten participants in two blocks, including outside participation from Big Japan Pro Wrestling's Daisuke Sekimoto, New Japan Pro-Wrestling's Manabu Nakanishi and Togi Makabe and Dragon Gate's Masaaki Mochizuki. As a result of a tie for the lead in Block B, a three-way match between Nakanishi, Takao Omori and Masato Tanaka would be held on the final day to decide the finalist; Tanaka won the match by pinning Omori, and would defeat Makabe in the final.

Final standings
Block A		Block B	
Togi Makabe	6	Masato Tanaka	5
Masaaki Mochizuki	4	Manabu Nakanishi	5
Shinjiro Otani	4	Takao Omori	5
Kohei Sato	4	Daisuke Sekimoto	3
Kamikaze	2	Ryouji Sai	2

Block A	Kamikaze	Togi Makabe	Masaaki Mochizuki	Shinjiro Otani	Kohei Sato
Kamikaze	X	Makabe (12:36)	Mochizuki (11:17)	Otani (12:55)	Kamikaze (11:55)
Togi Makabe	Makabe (12:36)	X	Makabe (9:06)	Makabe (12:29)	Sato (7:18)
Masaaki Mochizuki	Mochizuki (11:17)	Makabe (9:06)	X	Otani (15:36)	Mochizuki (7:42)
Shinjiro Otani	Otani (12:55)	Makabe (12:29)	Otani (15:36)	X	Sato (14:02)
Kohei Sato	Kamikaze (11:55)	Sato (7:18)	Mochizuki (7:42)	Sato (14:02)	X
Block B	Manabu Nakanishi	Takao Omori	Ryouji Sai	Daisuke Sekimoto	Masato Tanaka
Manabu Nakanishi	X	Omori (17:24)	Nakanishi (14:53)	Nakanishi (16:55)	Draw (30:00)
Takao Omori	Omori (17:24)	X	Sai (13:27)	Draw (30:00)	Omori (19:05)
Ryouji Sai	Nakanishi (14:53)	Sai (13:27)	X	Sekimoto (16:40)	Tanaka (21:25)
Daisuke Sekimoto	Nakanishi (16:55)	Draw (30:00)	Sekimoto (16:40)	X	Tanaka (18:44)
Masato Tanaka	Draw (30:00)	Omori (19:05)	Tanaka (21:25)	Tanaka (18:44)	X

Final
A1	Togi Makabe	Pin
B1	Masato Tanaka	19:37

=== 2009 ===
The 2009 Fire Festival was held from July 25 to August 8 over seven shows. It featured ten participants in two blocks, including outside participation from Big Japan Pro Wrestling's Daisuke Sekimoto and Apache Army's Tetsuhiro Kuroda. Both blocks ended in a tie for first place after the group stage; a four-way tie in Block A between Kohei Sato, Akebono, Ikuto Hidaka and Shinjiro Otani, and a three-way tie in Block B between Ryouji Sai, Masato Tanaka and Daisuke Sekimoto. This marked the fourth year in a row that such a tie has occurred. Both ties would be decided in a three- or four-way match on the night of the tournament. Sato and Sai won their respective matches, and Sai would go on to win the final.

Final standings
Block A		Block B	
Kohei Sato	5	Ryouji Sai	5
Akebono	5	Daisuke Sekimoto	5
Ikuto Hidaka	5	Masato Tanaka	5
Shinjiro Otani	5	Magnitude Kishiwada	3
Shito Ueda	0	Tetsuhiro Kuroda	2

Block A	Akebono	Ikuto Hidaka	Shinjiro Otani	Kohei Sato	Shito Ueda
Akebono	X	Draw (7:29)	Otani (16:20)	Akebono (6:55)	Akebono (3:16)
Ikuto Hidaka	Draw (7:29)	X	Hidaka (17:26)	Sato (15:12)	Hidaka (7:49)
Shinjiro Otani	Otani (16:20)	Hidaka (17:26)	X	Draw (30:00)	Otani (9:19)
Kohei Sato	Akebono (6:55)	Sato (15:12)	Draw (30:00)	X	Sato (9:55)
Shito Ueda	Akebono (3:16)	Hidaka (7:49)	Otani (9:19)	Sato (9:55)	X
Block B	Magnitude Kishiwada	Tetsuhiro Kuroda	Ryouji Sai	Daisuke Sekimoto	Masato Tanaka
Magnitude Kishiwada	X	Kishiwada (16:42)	Sai (16:49)	Draw (30:00)	Tanaka (20:46)
Tetsuhiro Kuroda	Kishiwada (16:42)	X	Sai (18:31)	Kuroda (16:32)	Tanaka (16:12)
Ryouji Sai	Sai (16:49)	Sai (18:31)	X	Sekimoto (20:33)	Draw (29:52)
Daisuke Sekimoto	Draw (30:00)	Kuroda (16:32)	Sekimoto (20:33)	X	Sekimoto (21:43)
Masato Tanaka	Tanaka (20:46)	Tanaka (16:12)	Draw (29:52)	Sekimoto (21:43)	X

Final
A1	Kohei Sato	Pin
B1	Ryouji Sai	24:14

=== 2010 ===
The 2010 Fire Festival was held from July 24 to August 4 over seven shows. It featured ten participants in two blocks.

Final standings
Block A		Block B	
Shinjiro Otani	5	Masato Tanaka	5
The Predator	4	Joe Legend	4
Daisuke Sekimoto	4	Kohei Sato	4
Yutaka Yoshie	4	Ikuto Hidaka	4
Takuya Sugawara	3	Ryouji Sai	3

Block A	Shinjiro Otani	The Predator	Daisuke Sekimoto	Takuya Sugawara	Yutaka Yoshie
Shinjiro Otani	X	Otani (13:56)	Draw (30:00)	Otani (15:12)	Yoshie (16:46)
The Predator	Otani (13:56)	X	The Predator (15:00)	Sugawara (7:42)	The Predator (14:11)
Daisuke Sekimoto	Draw (30:00)	The Predator (15:00)	X	Draw (15:08)	Sekimoto (14:32)
Takuya Sugawara	Otani (15:12)	Sugawara (7:42)	Draw (15:08)	X	Yoshie (11:11)
Yutaka Yoshie	Yoshie (16:46)	The Predator (14:11)	Sekimoto (14:32)	Yoshie (11:11)	X
Block B	Ikuto Hidaka	Joe Legend	Ryouji Sai	Kohei Sato	Masato Tanaka
Ikuto Hidaka	X	Legend (23:11)	Hidaka (13:36)	Sato (16:13)	Hidaka (21:43)
Joe Legend	Legend (23:11)	X	Sai (12:36)	Legend (13:05)	Tanaka (13:52)
Ryouji Sai	Hidaka (13:36)	Sai (12:36)	X	Draw (21:16)	Tanaka (17:45)
Kohei Sato	Sato (16:13)	Legend (13:05)	Draw (21:16)	X	Draw (30:00)
Masato Tanaka	Hidaka (21:43)	Tanaka (13:52)	Tanaka (17:45)	Draw (30:00)	X

Final
A1	Shinjiro Otani	Pin
B1	Masato Tanaka	22:38

=== 2011 ===
The 2011 Fire Festival was held from July 24 to August 7 over eight shows. It featured ten participants in two blocks.

Final standings
Block A		Block B	
Kohei Sato	7	Daisuke Sekimoto	6
Akebono	6	Masato Tanaka	5
Shinjiro Otani	4	Ryouji Sai	4
Zeus	3	Atsushi Sawada	3
Kenta Kakinuma	0	Fujita Hayato	2

Block A	Akebono	Kenta Kakinuma	Shinjiro Otani	Kohei Sato	Zeus
Akebono	X	Akebono (6:12)	Akebono (16:31)	Sato (6:48)	Akebono (5:52)
Kenta Kakinuma	Akebono (6:12)	X	Otani	Sato (12:34)	Zeus (8:57)
Shinjiro Otani	Akebono (16:31)	Otani	X	Sato (13:00)	Otani (15:59)
Kohei Sato	Sato (6:48)	Sato (12:34)	Sato (13:00)	X	Draw (12:52)
Zeus	Akebono (5:52)	Zeus (8:57)	Otani (15:59)	Draw (12:52)	X
Block B	Fujita Hayato	Ryouji Sai	Atsushi Sawada	Daisuke Sekimoto	Masato Tanaka
Fujita Hayato	X	Sai (14:42)	Sawada (9:56)	Sekimoto (13:46)	Hayato (12:41)
Ryouji Sai	Sai (14:42)	X	Sai (13:35)	Sekimoto (18:41)	Tanaka (16:19)
Atsushi Sawada	Sawada (9:56)	Sai (13:35)	X	Draw (9:50)	Tanaka (8:23)
Daisuke Sekimoto	Sekimoto (13:46)	Sekimoto (18:41)	Draw (9:50)	X	Draw (30:00)
Masato Tanaka	Hayato (12:41)	Tanaka (16:19)	Tanaka (8:23)	Draw (30:00)	X

Final
A1	Kohei Sato	Pin
B1	Daisuke Sekimoto	16:09

Sekimoto was awarded a NWA Premium Heavyweight Championship as a result of his tournament win, but lost the title in an unification match on May 16, 2012 against World Heavyweight Champion Akebono and the title was abandoned.

=== 2012 ===
The 2012 Fire Festival was held from July 20 to August 5 over eleven shows. It featured ten participants in two blocks.

Final standings
Block A		Block B	
Go Shiozaki	7	Masato Tanaka	7
Shinjiro Otani	6	Daisuke Sekimoto	5
Ryouji Sai	4	Kohei Sato	3
Tomoaki Honma	3	Muhammad Yone	3
Daichi Hashimoto	0	Kamikaze	2

Block A	Daichi Hashimoto	Tomoaki Honma	Shinjiro Otani	Ryouji Sai	Go Shiozaki
Daichi Hashimoto	X	Honma (15:52)	Otani (21:48)	Sai (13:15)	Shiozaki (14:02)
Tomoaki Honma	Honma (15:52)	X	Otani (21:23)	Sai (12:16)	Draw (30:00)
Shinjiro Otani	Otani (21:48)	Otani (21:23)	X	Otani (16:01)	Shiozaki (17:23)
Ryouji Sai	Sai (13:15)	Sai (12:16)	Otani (16:01)	X	Shiozaki (20:59)
Go Shiozaki	Shiozaki (14:02)	Draw (30:00)	Shiozaki (17:23)	Shiozaki (20:59)	X
Block B	Kamikaze	Kohei Sato	Daisuke Sekimoto	Masato Tanaka	Muhammad Yone
Kamikaze	X	Kamikaze (12:28)	Sekimoto (13:53)	Tanaka (18:18)	Yone (11:46)
Kohei Sato	Kamikaze (12:28)	X	Sekimoto (16:06)	Draw (30:00)	Sato (11:49)
Daisuke Sekimoto	Sekimoto (13:53)	Sekimoto (16:06)	X	Tanaka (26:42)	Draw (30:00)
Masato Tanaka	Tanaka (18:18)	Draw (30:00)	Tanaka (26:42)	X	Tanaka (15:07)
Muhammad Yone	Yone (11:46)	Sato (11:49)	Draw (30:00)	Tanaka (15:07)	X

Final
A1	Go Shiozaki	Pin
B1	Masato Tanaka	20:48

=== 2013 ===
The 2013 Fire Festival was held from July 17 to August 4 over ten shows. It featured twelve participants in two blocks and was contested for the vacant World Heavyweight Championship. New Zealander James Raideen became the first foreigner to win the tournament. At 22 years old, he also became both the youngest winner of the tournament and the youngest World Heavyweight Champion in history.

Final standings
Block A		Block B	
Masato Tanaka	8	James Raideen	7
Daisuke Sekimoto	7	Shinjiro Otani	6
Kohei Sato	5	Yuji Okabayashi	5
Kazma Sakamoto	5	Yutaka Yoshie	5
Yusaku Obata	3	Ryouji Sai	4
Maybach β	2	Daemon Ueda	3

Block A	Maybach β	Yusaku Obata	Kazma Sakamoto	Kohei Sato	Daisuke Sekimoto	Masato Tanaka
Maybach β	X	Obata (12:02)	Sakamoto (12:41)	Maybach (14:29)	Sekimoto (10:41)	Tanaka
Yusaku Obata	Obata (12:02)	X	Sakamoto (14:12)	Draw (30:00)	Sekimoto (17:08)	Tanaka (6:51)
Kazma Sakamoto	Sakamoto (12:41)	Sakamoto (14:12)	X	Sato	Draw (30:00)	Tanaka (15:18)
Kohei Sato	Maybach (14:29)	Draw (30:00)	Sato	X	Sato (13:20)	Tanaka (16:26)
Daisuke Sekimoto	Sekimoto (10:41)	Sekimoto (17:08)	Draw (30:00)	Sato (13:20)	X	Sekimoto (23:52)
Masato Tanaka	Tanaka	Tanaka (6:51)	Tanaka (15:18)	Tanaka (16:26)	Sekimoto (23:52)	X
Block B	Yuji Okabayashi	Shinjiro Otani	James Raideen	Ryouji Sai	Daemon Ueda	Yutaka Yoshie
Yuji Okabayashi	X	Otani (17:52)	Raideen (13:36)	Okabayashi (13:43)	Okabayashi (12:39)	Draw (30:00)
Shinjiro Otani	Otani (17:52)	X	Otani (17:58)	Sai (16:53)	Otani	Yoshie (14:24)
James Raideen	Raideen (13:36)	Otani (17:58)	X	Raideen (10:19)	Draw (30:00)	Raideen
Ryouji Sai	Okabayashi (13:43)	Sai (16:53)	Raideen (10:19)	X	Ueda (10:54)	Sai (13:42)
Daemon Ueda	Okabayashi (12:39)	Otani	Draw (30:00)	Ueda (10:54)	X	Yoshie (9:47)
Yutaka Yoshie	Draw (30:00)	Yoshie (14:24)	Raideen	Sai (13:42)	Yoshie (9:47)	X

Final
A1	Masato Tanaka	Pin
B1	James Raideen	17:05

=== 2014 ===
The 2014 Fire Festival took place from July 13 to August 3 over nine shows. It featured twelve participants in two blocks, including outside participation from Big Japan Pro Wrestling's Daisuke Sekimoto and Kazuki Hashimoto, freelancer Hideki Suzuki and Wrestle-1's Kai. One of the matches in the tournament took place at an event held by Wrestle-1. 2014 marked the first time the tournament featured semifinal matches.

Final standings
Block A		Block B	
Kai	7	Kohei Sato	7
Ryouji Sai	6	Daemon Ueda	6
Daisuke Sekimoto	5	Masato Tanaka	6
Hideki Suzuki	4	Shinjiro Otani	4
Tama Williams	4	Kazuki Hashimoto	3
Yusaku Obata	4	Yoshikazu Yokoyama	2

Block A	Kai	Yusaku Obata	Ryouji Sai	Daisuke Sekimoto	Hideki Suzuki	Tama Williams
Kai	X	Kai (10:31)	Kai (16:37)	Draw (30:00)	Suzuki (12:21)	Kai (9:34)
Yusaku Obata	Kai (10:31)	X	Obata (15:57)	Sekimoto	Suzuki (8:54)	Obata (13:41)
Ryouji Sai	Kai (16:37)	Obata (15:57)	X	Sai	Sai (11:39)	Sai (10:01)
Daisuke Sekimoto	Draw (30:00)	Sekimoto	Sai	X	Sekimoto (17:02)	Williams (12:43)
Hideki Suzuki	Suzuki (12:21)	Suzuki (8:54)	Sai (11:39)	Sekimoto (17:02)	X	Williams
Tama Williams	Kai (9:34)	Obata (13:41)	Sai (10:01)	Williams (12:43)	Williams	X
Block B	Kazuki Hashimoto	Kohei Sato	Shinjiro Otani	Masato Tanaka	Daemon Ueda	Yoshikazu Yokoyama
Kazuki Hashimoto	X	Sato	Otani	Tanaka	Hashimoto	Draw (9:23)
Kohei Sato	Sato	X	Sato	Sato	Ueda (8:52)	Draw (9:21)
Shinjiro Otani	Otani	Sato	X	Tanaka (21:53)	Ueda (14:12)	Otani (14:02)
Masato Tanaka	Tanaka	Sato	Tanaka (21:53)	X	Ueda (15:02)	Tanaka (12:32)
Daemon Ueda	Hashimoto	Ueda (8:52)	Ueda (14:12)	Ueda (15:02)	X	Yokoyama (12:54)
Yoshikazu Yokoyama	Draw (9:23)	Draw (9:21)	Otani (14:02)	Tanaka (12:32)	Yokoyama (12:54)	X

Semifinals
A1	Kai	Pin
B2	Daemon Ueda
B1	Kohei Sato	Pin
A2	Ryouji Sai

Final
Kai	Pin
Ryouji Sai

=== 2015 ===
The 2015 Fire Festival took place from July 16 to August 2 over eleven shows. It featured twelve participants in two blocks. Fujita Hayato was forced to pull out of the tournament with a knee injury following his first match, forfeiting the rest of his matches.

Final standings
Block A		Block B	
Kohei Sato	8	Daisuke Sekimoto	8
Masato Tanaka	7	James Raideen	7
Kamikaze	6	Hideki Suzuki	5
Yusaku Obata	5	Ryouji Sai	4
Masakado	4	Shinjiro Otani	4
Fujita Hayato	0	Taru	2

Block A	Fujita Hayato	Kamikaze	Masakado	Yusaku Obata	Kohei Sato	Masato Tanaka
Fujita Hayato	X	Kamikaze (forfeit)	Masakado (forfeit)	Obata (forfeit)	Sato (forfeit)	Tanaka (12:49)
Kamikaze	Kamikaze (forfeit)	X	Kamikaze (9:41)	Kamikaze (3:15)	Sato (14:52)	Tanaka (13:21)
Masakado	Masakado (forfeit)	Kamikaze (9:41)	X	Masakado (12:24)	Sato (13:00)	Tanaka (11:48)
Yusaku Obata	Obata (forfeit)	Kamikaze (3:15)	Masakado (12:24)	X	Obata (11:01)	Draw (30:00)
Kohei Sato	Sato (forfeit)	Sato (14:52)	Sato (13:00)	Obata (11:01)	X	Sato (10:29)
Masato Tanaka	Tanaka (12:49)	Tanaka (13:21)	Tanaka (11:48)	Draw (30:00)	Sato (10:29)	X
Block B	Shinjiro Otani	James Raideen	Ryouji Sai	Daisuke Sekimoto	Hideki Suzuki	Taru
Shinjiro Otani	X	Raideen (13:05)	Sai (14:11)	Sekimoto (11:58)	Otani (12:52)	Otani (13:25)
James Raideen	Raideen (13:05)	X	Raideen (9:41)	Sekimoto (10:25)	Draw (9:12)	Raideen (9:13)
Ryouji Sai	Sai (14:11)	Raideen (9:41)	X	Sekimoto (13:51)	Suzuki (11:20)	Sai (13:36)
Daisuke Sekimoto	Sekimoto (11:58)	Sekimoto (10:25)	Sekimoto (13:51)	X	Sekimoto (10:51)	Taru (10:11)
Hideki Suzuki	Otani (12:52)	Draw (9:12)	Suzuki (11:20)	Sekimoto (10:51)	X	Suzuki (10:00)
Taru	Otani (13:25)	Raideen (9:13)	Sai (13:36)	Taru (10:11)	Suzuki (10:00)	X

Semifinals
A1	Kohei Sato	Pin
B2	James Raideen	8:52
B1	Daisuke Sekimoto	Pin
A2	Masato Tanaka	12:30

Final
Kohei Sato	Pin
Daisuke Sekimoto	15:58

=== 2016 ===
The 2016 Fire Festival took place from July 8 to 31 over eleven shows. In the tournament, a win by a pinfall, submission or knockout was worth five points, a win by countout, disqualification, TKO or referee stoppage was worth four points, a draw was worth three points and a loss none. Buffa missed his first eight matches in the tournament due to an injury.

Final standings
Wrestlers	Score
Shinjiro Otani	30
Yusaku Obata	28
Masato Tanaka	27
Ryota Hama	27
James Raideen	26
Kohei Sato	25
Shogun Okamoto	25
Hayato Fujita	23
Kamikaze	15
Buffa	0

Results	Buffa	Hayato Fujita	James Raideen	Kamikaze	Kohei Sato	Masato Tanaka	Ryota Hama	Shinjiro Otani	Shogun Okamoto	Yusaku Obata
Buffa	X	Fujita (forfeit)	Raideen (forfeit)	Kamikaze (forfeit)	Sato (forfeit)	Tanaka (forfeit)	Hama (forfeit)	Otani (10:59)	Okamoto (forfeit)	Obata (forfeit)
Hayato Fujita	Fujita (forfeit)	X	Raideen (15:46)	Fujita (11:49)	Sato (10:40)	Draw (30:00)	Hama (9:58)	Fujita (15:54)	Okamoto (11:38)	Fujita (18:35)
James Raideen	Raideen (forfeit)	Raideen (15:46)	X	Kamikaze (8:43)	Sato (8:21)	Raideen (14:10)	Draw (7:58)	Otani (14:16)	Raideen (9:48)	Draw (30:00)
Kamikaze	Kamikaze (forfeit)	Fujita (11:49)	Kamikaze (8:43)	X	Sato (10:18)	Tanaka (11:14)	Hama (6:39)	Otani (13:48)	Okamoto (10:20)	Kamikaze (13:50)
Kohei Sato	Sato (forfeit)	Sato (10:40)	Sato (8:21)	Sato (10:18)	X	Tanaka (15:50)	Hama (9:02)	Otani (4:15)	Sato (8:19)	Obata (10:20)
Masato Tanaka	Tanaka (forfeit)	Draw (30:00)	Raideen (14:10)	Tanaka (11:14)	Tanaka (15:50)	X	Tanaka (4:58)	Otani (18:35)	Okamoto (11:59)	Tanaka (18:46)
Ryota Hama	Hama (forfeit)	Hama (9:58)	Draw (7:58)	Hama (6:39)	Hama (9:02)	Tanaka (4:58)	X	Hama (14:21)	Okamoto (7:30)	Obata (8:12)
Shinjiro Otani	Otani (10:59)	Fujita (15:54)	Otani (14:16)	Otani (13:48)	Otani (4:15)	Otani (18:35)	Hama (14:21)	X	Otani (13:00)	Obata (17:36)
Shogun Okamoto	Okamoto (forfeit)	Okamoto (11:38)	Raideen (9:48)	Okamoto (10:20)	Sato (8:19)	Okamoto (11:59)	Okamoto (7:30)	Otani (13:00)	X	Obata (10:11)
Yusaku Obata	Obata (forfeit)	Fujita (18:35)	Draw (30:00)	Kamikaze (13:50)	Obata (10:20)	Tanaka (18:46)	Obata (8:12)	Obata (17:36)	Obata (10:11)	X

Final
1	Shinjiro Otani	Pin
2	Yusaku Obata	29:50

=== 2017 ===
The 2017 Fire Festival ran from July 9 to 30 over 13 shows.

Final standings
Wrestlers	Score
Masato Tanaka	31
Yusaku Obata	31
Shogun Okamoto	30
Kenoh	28
Yuko Miyamoto	26
Daiki Inaba	23
Super Tiger	20
Kohei Sato	20
James Raideen	15
Leona	5

Results	Inaba	Kenoh	Leona	Miyamoto	Okamoto	Obata	Raideen	Sato	Tiger	Tanaka
Inaba	X	Draw (30:00)	Inaba (8:54)	Inaba (8:35)	Okamoto (10:25)	Inaba (12:24)	Raideen (9:59)	Sato (9:48)	Inaba (11:13)	Tanaka (17:21)
Kenoh	Draw (30:00)	X	Kenoh (10:25)	Kenoh (10:18)	Okamoto (12:20)	Obata (10:28)	Kenoh (10:50)	Kenoh (10:50)	Kenoh (11:48)	Tanaka (19:30)
Leona	Inaba (8:54)	Kenoh (10:25)	X	Miyamoto (10:42)	Okamoto (10:18)	Leona (10:43)	Raideen (9:49)	Sato (10:42)	Tiger (12:56)	Tanaka (11:41)
Miyamoto	Inaba (8:35)	Kenoh (10:18)	Miyamoto (10:42)	X	Okamoto (10:10)	Draw (22:12)	Miyamoto (12:11)	Miyamoto (12:00)	Miyamoto (11:41)	Draw (30:00)
Okamoto	Okamoto (10:25)	Okamoto (12:20)	Okamoto (10:18)	Okamoto (10:10)	X	Obata (10:40)	Raideen (5:59)	Okamoto (7:33)	Tiger (9:26)	Okamoto (10:35)
Obata	Inaba (12:24)	Obata (10:28)	Leona (10:43)	Draw (22:12)	Obata (10:40)	X	Obata (13:01)	Obata (11:12)	Obata (13:03)	Draw (30:00)
Raideen	Raideen (9:59)	Kenoh (10:50)	Raideen (9:49)	Miyamoto (12:11)	Raideen (5:59)	Obata (13:01)	X	Sato (8:43)	Tiger (7:38)	Tanaka (10:31)
Sato	Sato (9:48)	Kenoh (10:50)	Sato (10:42)	Miyamoto (12:00)	Okamoto (7:33)	Obata (11:12)	Sato (8:43)	X	Tiger (8:59)	Sato (13:51)
Tiger	Inaba (11:13)	Kenoh (11:48)	Tiger (12:56)	Miyamoto (11:41)	Tiger (9:26)	Obata (13:03)	Tiger (7:38)	Tiger (8:59)	X	Tanaka (13:28)
Tanaka	Tanaka (17:21)	Tanaka (19:30)	Tanaka (11:41)	Draw (30:00)	Okamoto (10:35)	Draw (30:00)	Tanaka (10:31)	Sato (13:51)	Tanaka (13:28)	X

Final
1	Masato Tanaka	Pin
1	Yusaku Obata	30:10

=== 2018 ===
The 2018 Fire Festival took place from July 8 to July 29 over ten shows. It featured fourteen participants in two blocks. The point system from 2016 and 2017 returned for the third year.

Final standings
Block A		Block B	
Yuko Miyamoto	19	Kohei Sato	23
Masato Tanaka	18	Yuji Hino	20
Jiro Kuroshio	18	Hartley Jackson	20
Shogun Okamoto	15	Sugi	18
Chris Vice	15	Super Tiger	15
Towa Iwasaki	10	Hiroshi Yamato	10
Takuya Sugawara	10	Shinjiro Otani	0

Block A	Iwasaki	Kuroshio	Miyamoto	Okamoto	Sugawara	Tanaka	Vice
Iwasaki	—N/a	Kuroshio (13:41)	Miyamoto (9:34)	Okamoto (10:13)	Iwasaki (9:27)	Tanaka (9:12)	Iwasaki (1:52)
Kuroshio	Kuroshio (13:41)	—N/a	Kuroshio (12:26)	Okamoto (8:06)	Sugawara (11:23)	Draw (30:00)	Kuroshio (10:53)
Miyamoto	Miyamoto (9:34)	Kuroshio (12:26)	—N/a	Miyamoto (12:21)	Miyamoto (10:21)	Tanaka (13:07)	Miyamoto (11:19)
Okamoto	Okamoto (10:13)	Okamoto (8:06)	Miyamoto (12:21)	—N/a	Okamoto (9:22)	Tanaka (9:31)	Vice (3:18)
Sugawara	Iwasaki (9:27)	Sugawara (11:23)	Miyamoto (10:21)	Okamoto (9:22)	—N/a	Sugawara (9:04)	Vice (7:38)
Tanaka	Tanaka (9:12)	Draw (30:00)	Tanaka (13:07)	Tanaka (9:31)	Sugawara (9:04)	—N/a	Vice (6:07)
Vice	Iwasaki (1:52)	Kuroshio (10:53)	Miyamoto (11:19)	Vice (3:18)	Vice (7:38)	Vice (6:07)	—N/a
Block B	Hino	Jackson	Otani	Sato	Sugi	Tiger	Yamato
Hino	—N/a	Hino (11:44)	Hino (13:02)	Sato (7:20)	Sugi (13:36)	Hino (10:45)	Hino (8:24)
Jackson	Hino (11:44)	—N/a	Jackson (13:21)	Jackson (10:53)	Jackson (14:26)	Jackson (9:29)	Yamato (6:13)
Otani	Hino (13:02)	Jackson (13:21)	—N/a	Sato (14:20)	Sugi (12:49)	Tiger (12:08)	Yamato (13:22)
Sato	Sato (7:20)	Jackson (10:53)	Sato (14:20)	—N/a	DCO (8:48)	Sato (9:51)	Sato (12:31)
Sugi	Sugi (13:36)	Jackson (14:26)	Sugi (12:49)	DCO (8:48)	—N/a	Tiger (10:31)	Sugi (10:12)
Tiger	Hino (10:45)	Jackson (9:29)	Tiger (12:08)	Sato (9:51)	Tiger (10:31)	—N/a	Tiger (8:51)
Yamato	Hino (8:24)	Yamato (6:13)	Yamato (13:22)	Sato (12:31)	Sugi (10:12)	Tiger (8:51)	—N/a

Final
A1	Yuko Miyamoto	Pin
B1	Kohei Sato	18:16

=== 2019 ===
The 2019 Fire Festival took place from June 16 to July 28 over nine shows. It featured fourteen participants in two blocks. The point system from 2016, 2017, and 2018 returned for the fourth year.

Final standings
Block A		Block B	
Yuji Hino	23	Towa Iwasaki	19
Masato Tanaka	20	Yuko Miyamoto	18
Chris Vice	20	Masashi Takeda	18
Sugi	18	Kohei Sato	18
Super Tiger	13	Takuya Sugawara	15
Yuya Aoki	8	Shogun Okamoto	10
Asuka	5	Yasu Kubota	5

Block A	Aoki	Asuka	Hino	Sugi	Tanaka	Tiger	Vice
Aoki	—N/a	Aoki (6:18)	Hino (8:41)	Sugi (7:56)	Tanaka (11:19)	DCO (10:55)	Vice (11:02)
Asuka	Aoki (6:18)	—N/a	Hino (11:10)	Sugi (6:51)	Asuka (13:25)	Tiger (9:29)	Vice (11:21)
Hino	Hino (8:41)	Hino (11:10)	—N/a	DCO (10:20)	Tanaka (21:18)	Hino (12:06)	Hino (12:44)
Sugi	Sugi (7:56)	Sugi (6:51)	DCO (10:20)	—N/a	Tanaka (10:39)	Sugi (11:02)	Vice (9:28)
Tanaka	Tanaka (11:19)	Asuka (13:25)	Tanaka (21:18)	Tanaka (10:39)	—N/a	Tiger (10:11)	Tanaka (14:16)
Tiger	DCO (10:55)	Tiger (9:29)	Hino (12:06)	Sugi (11:02)	Tiger (10:11)	—N/a	Vice (9:21)
Vice	Vice (11:02)	Vice (11:21)	Hino (12:44)	Vice (9:28)	Tanaka (14:16)	Vice (9:21)	—N/a
Block B	Iwasaki	Kubota	Miyamoto	Okamoto	Sato	Sugawara	Takeda
Iwasaki	—N/a	Iwasaki (10:16)	Iwasaki (11:47)	Iwasaki (12:24)	Sato (12:24)	Iwasaki (13:02)	Takeda (9:49)
Kubota	Iwasaki (10:16)	—N/a	Miyamoto (10:00)	Okamoto (11:48)	Sato (16:38)	Kubota (11:12)	Takeda (10:59)
Miyamoto	Iwasaki (11:47)	Miyamoto (10:00)	—N/a	Miyamoto (12:43)	Sato (16:38)	Miyamoto (11:32)	Draw (30:00)
Okamoto	Iwasaki (12:24)	Okamoto (11:48)	Miyamoto (12:43)	—N/a	DCO (11:50)	Sugawara (9:43)	Okamoto (10:59)
Sato	Sato (12:24)	Sato (12:26)	Sato (16:38)	DCO (11:50)	—N/a	Sugawara (0:06)	Takeda (11:48)
Sugawara	Iwasaki (13:02)	Kubota (11:12)	Miyamoto (11:32)	Sugawara (9:43)	Sugawara (0:06)	—N/a	Sugawara (9:52)
Takeda	Takeda (9:49)	Takeda (10:59)	Draw (30:00)	Okamoto (10:59)	Takeda (11:48)	Sugawara (9:52)	—N/a

Final
A1	Yuji Hino	Pin
B1	Towa Iwasaki	17:17

=== 2020 ===
The 2020 edition of the Fire Festival extended on nine nights and culminated on October 25, 2020.

Final standings
Block A		Block B	
Hartley Jackson	23	Hayato Tamura	22
Yuji Hino	20	Chris Vice	18
T-Hawk	19	Masato Tanaka	18
Quiet Storm	15	Yuko Miyamoto	15
Yoshikazu Yokoyama	13	Tsugutaka Sato	15
Takuya Sugawara	13	Shogun Okamoto	13
Towa Iwasaki	3	Takafumi	5

Block A	Hino	Iwasaki	Jackson	Storm	Sugawara	T-Hawk	Yokoyama
Hino	—N/a	Hino (6:26)	Hino (14:25)	Hino (11:25)	Hino (14:07)	T-Hawk (15:04)	Yokoyama (10:39)
Iwasaki	Hino (6:26)	—N/a	Jackson (11:59)	Storm (10:58)	Sugawara (12:25)	T-Hawk (13:35)	DCO (11:01)
Jackson	Hino (14:25)	Jackson (11:59)	—N/a	Jackson (12:32)	Jackson (8:46)	Jackson (10:28)	DCO (6:39)
Storm	Hino (11:25)	Storm (10:58)	Jackson (12:32)	—N/a	Sugawara (9:38)	Storm (11:33)	Storm (7:59)
Sugawara	Hino (14:07)	Sugawara (12:25)	Jackson (8:46)	Sugawara (9:38)	—N/a	T-Hawk (15:23)	DCO (9:58)
T-Hawk	T-Hawk (15:04)	T-Hawk (13:35)	Jackson (10:28)	Storm (11:33)	T-Hawk (15:23)	—N/a	T-Hawk (7:25)
Yokoyama	Yokoyama (10:39)	DCO (11:01)	DCO (6:39)	Storm (7:59)	DCO (9:58)	T-Hawk (7:25)	—N/a
Block B	Miyamoto	Okamoto	Sato	Takafumi	Tamura	Tanaka	Vice
Miyamoto	—N/a	Okamoto (8:54)	Miyamoto (17:05)	Miyamoto (forfeit)	Tamura (11:40)	Miyamoto (12:15)	Vice (12:38)
Okamoto	Okamoto (8:54)	—N/a	Sato (9:09)	Okamoto (10:00)	Tamura (12:02)	Tanaka (10:37)	DCO (10:02)
Sato	Miyamoto (17:05)	Sato (9:09)	—N/a	Sato (forfeit)	Tamura (11:02)	Tanaka (11:03)	Sato (9:03)
Takafumi	Miyamoto (forfeit)	Okamoto (10:00)	Sato (forfeit)	—N/a	Takafumi (1:58)	Tanaka (forfeit)	Vice (forfeit)
Tamura	Tamura (11:40)	Tamura (12:02)	Tamura (11:02)	Takafumi (1:58)	—N/a	Draw (30:00)	Tamura (15:33)
Tanaka	Miyamoto (12:15)	Tanaka (10:37)	Tanaka (11:03)	Tanaka (forfeit)	Draw (30:00)	—N/a	Vice (1:32)
Vice	Vice (12:38)	DCO (10:02)	Sato (9:03)	Vice (forfeit)	Tamura (15:33)	Vice (1:32)	—N/a

Final
A1	Hartley Jackson	Pin
B1	Hayato Tamura	24:06

=== 2021 ===
The 2021 edition of the event will take place between July 2 and August 1, 2021.

Final standings
Block A		Block B	
Shinjiro Otani	20	Takuya Sugawara	15
Masato Tanaka	19	Shigehiro Irie	14
Yoshiki Inamura	15	Ayato Yoshida	13
Hartley Jackson	10	Chris Vice	13
Fuminori Abe	5	Shogun Okamoto	10
Tsugutaka Sato	5	Takafumi	10

Block A	Abe	Inamura	Jackson	Otani	Sato	Tanaka
Abe	—N/a	Inamura (13:00)	Jackson (17:02)	Otani (16:14)	Abe (8:52)	Tanaka (17:31)
Inamura	Inamura (13:00)	—N/a	Inamura (10:13)	Otani (13:54)	Inamura (10:51)	Tanaka (forfeit)
Jackson	Jackson (17:02)	Inamura (10:13)	—N/a	Jackson (15:56)	Sato (8:47)	Tanaka (3:39)
Otani	Otani (16:14)	Otani (13:54)	Jackson (15:56)	—N/a	Otani (14:46)	Otani (17:12)
Sato	Abe (8:52)	Inamura (10:51)	Sato (8:47)	Otani (14:46)	—N/a	Tanaka (11:58)
Tanaka	Tanaka (17:31)	Tanaka (forfeit)	Tanaka (3:39)	Otani (17:12)	Tanaka (11:58)	—N/a
Block B	Irie	Okamoto	Sugawara	Takafumi	Vice	Yoshida
Irie	—N/a	Irie (10:58)	Sugawara (9:00)	Takafumi (15:27)	Irie (12:58)	Irie (10:51)
Okamoto	Irie (10:58)	—N/a	Sugawara (11:24)	Okamoto (10:52)	Vice (12:25)	Okamoto (12:49)
Sugawara	Sugawara (9:00)	Sugawara (11:24)	—N/a	Takafumi (10:32)	Sugawara (11:28)	Yoshida (7:51)
Takafumi	Takafumi (15:27)	Okamoto (10:52)	Takafumi (10:32)	—N/a	Vice (6:45)	Yoshida (13:51)
Vice	Irie (12:58)	Vice (12:25)	Sugawara (11:28)	Vice (6:45)	—N/a	Draw (30:00)
Yoshida	Irie (10:51)	Okamoto (12:49)	Yoshida (7:51)	Yoshida (13:51)	Draw (30:00)	—N/a

Final
A1	Shinjiro Otani	Pin
B1	Takuya Sugawara	23:08

=== 2022 ===
The 2022 edition of the event took between July 1 and July 31, 2022.

Final standings
Block A		Block B	
Daisuke Sekimoto	18	Yoshiki Inamura	23
Chris Vice	15	Masato Tanaka	18
Takuya Sugawara	15	Takafumi	15
Shu Asakawa	13	Hide Kubota	10
Tsugutaka Sato	10	Fuminori Abe	10
Junya Matsunaga	5	Satsuki Nagao	0

Block A	Asakawa	Matsunaga	Sato	Sekimoto	Sugawara	Vice
Asakawa	—N/a	Asakawa (10:29)	Sato (11:52)	Draw (30:00)	Asakawa (12:05)	Vice (12:08)
Matsunaga	Asakawa (10:29)	—N/a	Matsunaga (10:07)	Sekimoto (10:12)	Sugawara (11:02)	Vice (5:15)
Sato	Sato (11:52)	Matsunaga (10:07)	—N/a	Sekimoto (9:28)	Sugawara (9:13)	Sato (15:09)
Sekimoto	Draw (30:00)	Sekimoto (10:12)	Sekimoto (9:28)	—N/a	Sugawara (14:36)	Sekimoto (13:02)
Sugawara	Asakawa (12:05)	Sugawara (11:02)	Sugawara (9:13)	Sugawara (14:36)	—N/a	Vice (5:15)
Vice	Vice (12:08)	Vice (5:15)	Sato (15:09)	Sekimoto (13:02)	Vice (5:15)	—N/a
Block B	Abe	Inamura	Kubota	Nagao	Takafumi	Tanaka
Abe	—N/a	Inamura (13:00)	Kubota (12:00)	Abe (11:28)	Takafumi (12:46)	Abe (22:17)
Inamura	Inamura (13:00)	—N/a	Inamura (11:15)	Inamura (8:30)	Inamura (12:27)	Draw (30:00)
Kubota	Kubota (12:00)	Inamura (11:15)	—N/a	Kubota (9:41)	Takafumi (9:56)	Tanaka (13:43)
Nagao	Abe (11:28)	Inamura (8:30)	Kubota (9:41)	—N/a	Takafumi (9:52)	Tanaka (11:18)
Takafumi	Takafumi (12:46)	Inamura (12:27)	Takafumi (9:56)	Takafumi (9:52)	—N/a	Tanaka (12:16)
Tanaka	Abe (22:17)	Draw (30:00)	Tanaka (13:43)	Tanaka (11:18)	Tanaka (12:16)	—N/a

Final
A1	Daisuke Sekimoto	26:00
B1	Yoshiki Inamura	Pin

=== 2023 ===
The 2023 edition of the event took place between July 1 and 29, 2023. The edition saw the participation of Unagi Sayaka as the first ever female competitor of the tournament.

Final standings
Block A		Block B	
Junya Matsunaga	18	Kengo Mashimo	18
Yuko Miyamoto	15	Daisuke Sekimoto	16
Takuya Sugawara	15	Chris Vice	16
Masato Tanaka	15	Fuminori Abe	13
Mizuki Watase	13	Tsugutaka Sato	8
Unagi Sayaka	0	Rikiya Fudo	5

Block A	Matsunaga	Miyamoto	Sayaka	Sugawara	Tanaka	Watase
Matsunaga	—N/a	Matsunaga (12:10)	Matsunaga (12:54)	Matsunaga (13:26)	Tanaka (17:24)	DCO (12:28)
Miyamoto	Matsunaga (12:10)	—N/a	Miyamoto (12:37)	Sugawara (11:25)	Miyamoto (16:02)	Miyamoto (8:00)
Sayaka	Matsunaga (12:54)	Miyamoto (12:37)	—N/a	Sugawara (9:16)	Tanaka (15:29)	Watase (14:18)
Sugawara	Matsunaga (13:26)	Sugawara (11:25)	Sugawara (9:16)	—N/a	Sugawara (9:18)	Watase (11:14)
Tanaka	Tanaka (17:24)	Miyamoto (16:02)	Tanaka (15:29)	Sugawara (9:18)	—N/a	Tanaka (14:41)
Watase	DCO (12:28)	Miyamoto (8:00)	Watase (14:18)	Watase (11:14)	Tanaka (14:41)	—N/a
Block B	Abe	Fudo	Mashimo	Sato	Sekimoto	Vice
Abe	—N/a	Abe (2:15)	Mashimo (13:07)	Abe (9:47)	Draw (30:00)	Vice (forfeit)
Fudo	Abe (2:15)	—N/a	Mashimo (9:39)	Sato (11:16)	Sekimoto (10:19)	Fudo (8:56)
Mashimo	Mashimo (13:07)	Mashimo (9:39)	—N/a	Mashimo (8:33)	Draw (30:00)	Vice (16:04)
Sato	Abe (9:47)	Sato (11:16)	Mashimo (8:33)	—N/a	Sekimoto (11:06)	Draw (30:00)
Sekimoto	Draw (30:00)	Sekimoto (10:19)	Draw (30:00)	Sekimoto (11:06)	—N/a	Vice (15:34)
Vice	Vice (forfeit)	Fudo (8:56)	Vice (16:04)	Draw (30:00)	Vice (15:34)	—N/a

Final
A1	Junya Matsunaga	Pin
B1	Kengo Mashimo	22:54

=== 2024 ===
The 2024 edition of the event took place between May 18 and July 28, 2024.

Final standings
Block A		Block B	
Tsugutaka Sato	15	Koji Doi	20
Fuminori Abe	15	Chris Vice	18
Junya Matsunaga	15	Yuko Miyamoto	11
Satsuki Nagao	10	Tatsuya Hanami	10
Ender Kara	10	Ryuya Takekura	10
Yumehito Imanari	10	Blazer Tannai	3

Block A	Abe	Imanari	Kara	Matsunaga	Nagao	Sato
Abe	—N/a	Abe (14:11)	Abe (11:02)	Matsunaga (9:46)	Nagao (2:36)	Abe (N/A)
Imanari	Abe (14:11)	—N/a	Imanari (8:42)	Matsunaga (12:44)	Imanari (11:19)	Sato (12:44)
Kara	Abe (11:02)	Imanari (8:42)	—N/a	Matsunaga (8:45)	Kara (9:48)	Kara (8:47)
Matsunaga	Matsunaga (9:46)	Matsunaga (12:44)	Matsunaga (8:45)	—N/a	Nagao (10:24)	Sato (15:02)
Nagao	Nagao (2:36)	Imanari (11:19)	Kara (9:48)	Nagao (10:24)	—N/a	Sato (9:46)
Sato	Abe (N/A)	Sato (12:44)	Kara (8:47)	Sato (15:02)	Sato (9:46)	—N/a
Block B	Doi	Hanami	Miyamoto	Takekura	Tannai	Vice
Doi	—N/a	Doi (14:04)	Draw (20:00)	Doi (13:13)	DCO (9:27)	Doi (12:22)
Hanami	Doi (14:04)	—N/a	Hanami (11:51)	Takekura (7:31)	Hanami (11:21)	Vice (N/A)
Miyamoto	Draw (20:00)	Hanami (11:51)	—N/a	Takekura (13:59)	Miyamoto (8:58)	DCO (15:06)
Takekura	Doi (13:13)	Takekura (7:31)	Takekura (13:59)	—N/a	Takekura (N/A)	Vice (9:21)
Tannai	DCO (9:27)	Hanami (11:21)	Miyamoto (8:58)	Takekura (N/A)	—N/a	Vice (11:52)
Vice	Doi (12:22)	Vice (N/A)	DCO (15:06)	Vice (9:21)	Vice (11:52)	—N/a

Block A Decision
A1	Tsugutaka Sato	Pin
A2	Fuminori Abe	10:39
A3	Junya Matsunaga	–

Final
A1	Tsugutaka Sato	Pin
B1	Koji Doi	19:25

=== 2025 ===
The 2025 edition of the event took place between June 6 and July 4, 2025.

Final standings
Block A		Block B	
Chris Vice	20	Hayabusa	23
Masato Tanaka	15	Tsugutaka Sato	18
Takuya Sugawara	15	Yuko Miyamoto	18
Mammoth Sasaki	15	Junya Matsunaga	13
Kentaro Hachisu	10	Yasu Kubota	6
Yuki Toki	0	Jack Kennedy	5

Block A	Hachisu	Sasaki	Sugawara	Tanaka	Toki	Vice
Hachisu	—N/a	Sasaki (8:32)	Hachisu (9:54)	Tanaka (10:18)	Hachisu (10:24)	Vice (9:04)
Sasaki	Sasaki (8:32)	—N/a	Sugawara (9:11)	Sasaki (12:47)	Sasaki (8:12)	Vice (11:37)
Sugawara	Hachisu (9:54)	Sugawara (9:11)	—N/a	Tanaka (1:05)	Sugawara (2:01)	Sugawara (7:34)
Tanaka	Tanaka (10:18)	Sasaki (12:47)	Tanaka (1:05)	—N/a	Tanaka (10:08)	Vice (11:49)
Toki	Hachisu (10:24)	Sasaki (8:12)	Sugawara (2:01)	Tanaka (10:08)	—N/a	Vice (10:25)
Vice	Vice (9:04)	Vice (11:37)	Sugawara (7:34)	Vice (11:49)	Vice (10:25)	—N/a
Block B	Hayabusa	Kennedy	Kubota	Matsunaga	Miyamoto	Sato
Hayabusa	—N/a	Hayabusa (8:12)	Draw (11:20)	Hayabusa (13:01)	Hayabusa (13:51)	Hayabusa (14:42)
Kennedy	Hayabusa (8:12)	—N/a	Kennedy (13:05)	Matsunaga (13:44)	Miyamoto (14:07)	Sato (9:19)
Kubota	Draw (11:20)	Kennedy (13:05)	—N/a	Matsunaga (10:10)	DCO (9:23)	Sato (11:45)
Matsunaga	Hayabusa (13:01)	Matsunaga (13:44)	Matsunaga (10:10)	—N/a	Miyamoto (9:07)	Draw (30:00)
Miyamoto	Hayabusa (13:51)	Miyamoto (14:07)	DCO (9:23)	Miyamoto (9:07)	—N/a	Miyamoto (10:58)
Sato	Hayabusa (14:42)	Sato (9:19)	Sato (11:45)	Draw (30:00)	Miyamoto (10:58)	—N/a

Final
A1	Chris Vice	15:39
B1	Hayabusa	Pin

=== 2026 ===
The 2026 edition of the event took place between June 13 and August 7, 2026. On May 19, Zero1 announced that Chris Vice had injured his neck in training and would be unable to compete in the tournament, with Yuko Miyamoto taking his place.

Current standings
Block A		Block B	
Masato Tanaka	8	Katsuhiko Nakajima	8
Shuji Ishikawa	7	Hayabusa	6
Junya Matsunaga	6	Daichi Hashimoto	5
Kuma Arashi	5	Koji Doi	5
Kuroshio Tokyo Japan	4	Yuko Miyamoto	4
Ryunosuke Nagai	0	Tsugutaka Sato	2

Block A	Tanaka	Matsunaga	Ishikawa	Kuroshio	Arashi	Nagai
Tanaka	—N/a	Draw (30:00)	DKO (16:52)	Tanaka (13:56)	Tanaka (11:14)	Tanaka (10:21)
Matsunaga	Draw (30:00)	—N/a	Ishikawa (19:59)	Matsunaga (20:22)	Draw (30:00)	Matsunaga (4:25)
Ishikawa	DKO (16:52)	Ishikawa (19:59)	—N/a	Kuroshio (11:03)	Ishikawa (12:23)	Ishikawa (9:55)
Kuroshio	Tanaka (13:56)	Matsunaga (20:22)	Kuroshio (11:03)	—N/a	Arashi (13:23)	Kuroshio (14:59)
Arashi	Tanaka (11:14)	Draw (30:00)	Ishikawa (12:23)	Arashi (13:23)	—N/a	Arashi (11:50)
Nagai	Tanaka (10:21)	Matsunaga (4:25)	Ishikawa (9:55)	Kuroshio (14:59)	Arashi (11:50)	—N/a
Block B	Hayabusa	Miyamoto	Nakajima	Hashimoto	Doi	Sato
Hayabusa	—N/a	Hayabusa (12:11)	Hayabusa (19:43)	Hayabusa (18:24)	Doi (15:47)	Sato (15:13)
Miyamoto	Hayabusa (12:11)	—N/a	Nakajima (16:23)	DCO (14:42)	Draw (9:16)	Miyamoto (11:29)
Nakajima	Hayabusa (19:43)	Nakajima (16:23)	—N/a	Nakajima (21:08)	Nakajima (15:50)	Nakajima (12:18)
Hashimoto	Hayabusa (18:24)	DCO (14:42)	Nakajima (21:08)	—N/a	Hashimoto (15:18)	Hashimoto (13:53)
Doi	Doi (15:47)	Draw (9:16)	Nakajima (15:50)	Hashimoto (15:18)	—N/a	Doi (12:27)
Sato	Sato (15:13)	Miyamoto (11:29)	Nakajima (12:18)	Hashimoto (13:53)	Doi (12:27)	—N/a

Final
A1	Masato Tanaka	2:50
B1	Katsuhiko Nakajima	Pin

== See also ==
- Champion Carnival
- G1 Climax
- N-1 Victory
- Ikkitousen Strong Climb
- D-Oh Grand Prix
- King of Gate
