= Yusaku Obata =

Japanese professional wrestler (born 1984)

Personal information
- Born: February 13, 1984 (age 42) Namerikawa, Toyama Japan

Professional wrestling career
- Ring name(s): Yusaku Obata; Omatayuuchaku; Super Boogey Man
- Billed height: 175 cm (5 ft 9 in)
- Billed weight: 90 kg (198 lb)
- Trained by: Taka Michinoku
- Debut: April 24, 2005

Yusaku Obata (小幡優作, Obata Yusaku, born February 13, 1984) is a Japanese professional wrestler, currently a freelancer. He's best known for his time in Pro Wrestling Zero1 (ZERO1), where is a former World Heavyweight Champion, a former two-time NWA Intercontinental Tag Team Champion, a former NWA United National Heavyweight Champion, the winner of the 2013 and 2016 Furinkazan and the 2016 Fire Festival.

He is also known for his work in Apache Pro Wrestling Army, where he was a former WEW Tag Team Champion alongside HIROKI. Obata was originally trained by Kaientai Dojo and left the promotion in 2006. After leaving K-Dojo, Obata had much better success after signing with ZERO1 in 2012.

== Professional wrestling career ==
=== Kaientai Dojo (2004–2006) ===
In 2004, Obata joined Kaientai Dojo as a trainee. He was scheduled to debut against Yasu Urano but was postponed due to a neck injury. On April 24, 2005, Obata made his in-ring debut losing to Hajime Ishikawa. Obata then took part of the 2005 K-Metal League, finishing with one win and five losses placing last. Obata was then drafted to the GET brand and would later take part of the 2006 Strongest-K Tournament at GET Block A losing all of his matches in his block. On September 3, he would join KAZMA’s Kinnoto unit after appealing to join. This would be short lived due to Obata leaving K-Dojo after his contract expired on November 12.

=== Apache Pro Wrestling Army and XMF (2006–2009) ===
Before signing with Apache Pro, Obata made sporadic appearances until he signed after leaving K-Dojo on December 16, 2006. During his time in Apache he would regularly compete in Big Japan Pro Wrestling. This led to Obata getting his first title opportunity as he teamed with Kintaro Kanemura to challenge Daisuke Sekimoto and Yoshihito Sasaki for the BJW Tag Team Championship on November 26, 2007 but they lost. He would also appear in New Japan Pro-Wrestling LOCK UP events. In 2008, Apache Pro closed and he then joined Kanemura's XMF promotion but that promotion was short lived and closed in 2009.

=== Pro Wrestling ZERO1 (2008–2019) ===
Before he joined Pro Wrestling ZERO1, he would make sporadic appearances until he signed with promotion in June 2012. On June 22, Obata made his official debut after signing losing to Kohei Sato. On August 5, Obata won his first title defeating Shito Ueda for the NWA United National Heavyweight Championship. After a two month reign, Obata lost the NWA United National Heavyweight Championship to James Raideen on October 16. On November 6, Obata and Ueda defeated Masato Tanaka and Zeus for the NWA Intercontinental Tag Team Championship. Obata and Ueda took part in the 2012 Furinkazan tournament, losing to Zeus and James Raideen in the finals on December 15. Obata and Ueda vacated the titles on January 18, 2013 due to Obata being sidelined with an injury. In July, Obata took part in the 2013 Fire Festival tournament, where he finished with 3 points failing to advance to the finals. Obata and Ueda then took part of the 2013 Furinkazan tournament, defeating Raideen and Tama Williams in the finals on December 17.

After Obata and Ueda won the tournament, Ueda turned on Obata which led to a feud between the two. Subsequently, Obata formed an alliance with Masato Tanaka, Daichi Hashimoto and Ikuto Hidaka. The three later formed a stable named Dangan Yankees. On January 1, 2014 Obata and Tanaka received an opportunity for the NWA Intercontinental Tag Team Championship losing to KAMIKAZE and Shinjiro Otani. The feud between Obata and Ueda didn't end as Ueda formed Daemon-gun with KAMIKAZE, Takuya Sugawara and Touru Owashi. The two faced each other twice on March 18 and on March 30 where the loser would be forced to change his name and would also lose his hair. Obata ended up losing both matches with Ueda forcing Obata to have his head shaved and to being renamed to Omatayuuchaku. On April 9, after Omatayuuchaku lost to his Dangan Yankees Masato Tanaka, he would get the rights to his name back. From July until August, Obata took part of the 2014 Fire Festival at block A. He would finish his block with four wins five losses, finishing at last after losing to another block A participant Daisuke Sekimoto. At the end of the year, Obata took part of the 2014 Furinkazan tournament with Akebono losing in the semifinals to Shinjiro Otani and Yoshikazu Yokoyama on December 24. In 2015, Obata received two shots for the NWA United National Heavyweight Championship. The first shot was on July 7 and the second on July 21 losing to the defending champion KAMIKAZE on both occasions. Obata then entered the 2015 Fire Festival, where he finished with a record of two wins, two losses and one draw, same as block semifinalist Masato Tanaka, but failed to advance to the finals due to the match against Tanaka ending in a time-limit draw in their head-to-head match. On September 23, Obata unsuccessfully challenged Kohei Sato for the ZERO1 World Heavyweight Championship.

On June 16, before the 2016 Fire Festival, Obata had to defeat Hideki Hosaka to earn a place in the tournament. In July, Obata took part of the Fire Festival, finishing the tournament with five wins, three losses and one draw, advancing to the finals. On July 31, Obata defeated Shinjiro Otani to win the Fire Festival. The winner of the tournament is presented with the "Fire Sword", which they carry for the following year until the next Festival. Obata received his shot for the World Heavyweight Championship on August 18 unsuccessfully challenging Kohei Sato again for the championship. Obata then took part in the 2016 Furinkazan, forming a team with KAI. The two would then defeat Akebono and Shogun Okamoto to win the tournament. Instead of the two receiving a shot for the NWA Intercontinental Tag Team Championship Championship, Obata chose to receive another shot World Heavyweight Championship. Obata received his third shot for the World Heavyweight Championship unsuccessfully challenging Sato again for the third time. Obata and KAI would receive their shot for the NWA Intercontinental Tag Team Championship on March 2 losing to Akebono and Okamoto in a rematch. After Akebono and Okamoto vacated the titles due to Akebono's being sidelined with health issues, Obata and KAI defeated Hideki Suzuki and Kohei Sato for vacant NWA Intercontinental Tag Team Championship on May 21.

Obata then started feuding with former Dangan Yankees stablemate Masato Tanaka after Tanaka turned on Obata and joined the Voodoo Murders on February 19. Obata then took part of the 2017 Fire Festival, finishing the tournament with five wins, two losses and two draws, advancing to the finals. In the finals, Obata faced Tanaka, where he ended up losing his Fire Sword to Tanaka. On August 30, Obata and KAI were stripped of the NWA Intercontinental Tag Team Championship due to Zero1 being unable to book a title defense for the two because of scheduling conflicts. In the fall, Yuko Miyamoto asked Obata to team up with him in the Furinkazan Tag Tournament in which Obata accepted. The two ended up losing at the finals to Shogun Okamoto and Yutaka Yoshie. On January 1, 2018 Obata ended his feud with Tanaka by defeating him for the World Heavyweight Championship. Afterwards, he was challenged by Miyamoto in a double title match for his Bakuha-ō Championship and Obata's World Heavyweight Championship. The two faced each other on January 28 and the match ended in a double KO, thus Miyamoto and Obata retained their titles and Obata made his first successful defense. Obata next faced Isami Kodaka on February 12, but the match again ended in a draw, meaning Obata made his second successful defense. This changed on March 4, when he decisively defeated Kohei Sato to make his third successful defense. On April 22, he defeated Tanaka's Voodoo Murders stablemate Hartley Jackson to make his fourth successful defense. However on June 3, he lost the title back to Tanaka in his fifth defense by referee stoppage after he fell off the top rope and partially fractured and chipped a bone in his neck, which was later revealed as being caused by a heat stroke from dehydration and breathing problems. This also forced him to be removed from the 2018 Fire Festival that he was supposed to take part in the next month. On March 3, 2019, Obata announced his departure from Zero1.

== Championships and accomplishments ==
- Kaientai Dojo
  - Newcomer of the Year (2005)
- Pro Wrestling Illustrated
  - Ranked No. 358 of the top 500 singles wrestlers in the PWI 500 in 2018
- Pro Wrestling Zero1
  - World Heavyweight Championship (1 time)
  - NWA Intercontinental Tag Team Championship (2 times) – with Shito Ueda (1) and KAI (1)
  - NWA United National Heavyweight Championship (1 time)
  - Fire Festival (2016)
  - Furinkazan (2013) – with Daemon Ueda
  - Furinkazan (2016) – with KAI
  - Five-man Tag Team Tournament (2015) – with Hideki Suzuki, Kohei Sato, Masato Tanaka and Shinjiro Otani
- Apache Pro Wrestling Army
  - WEW Tag Team Championship (1 time) – with HIROKI
