= Junya Matsunaga =

Japanese professional wrestler

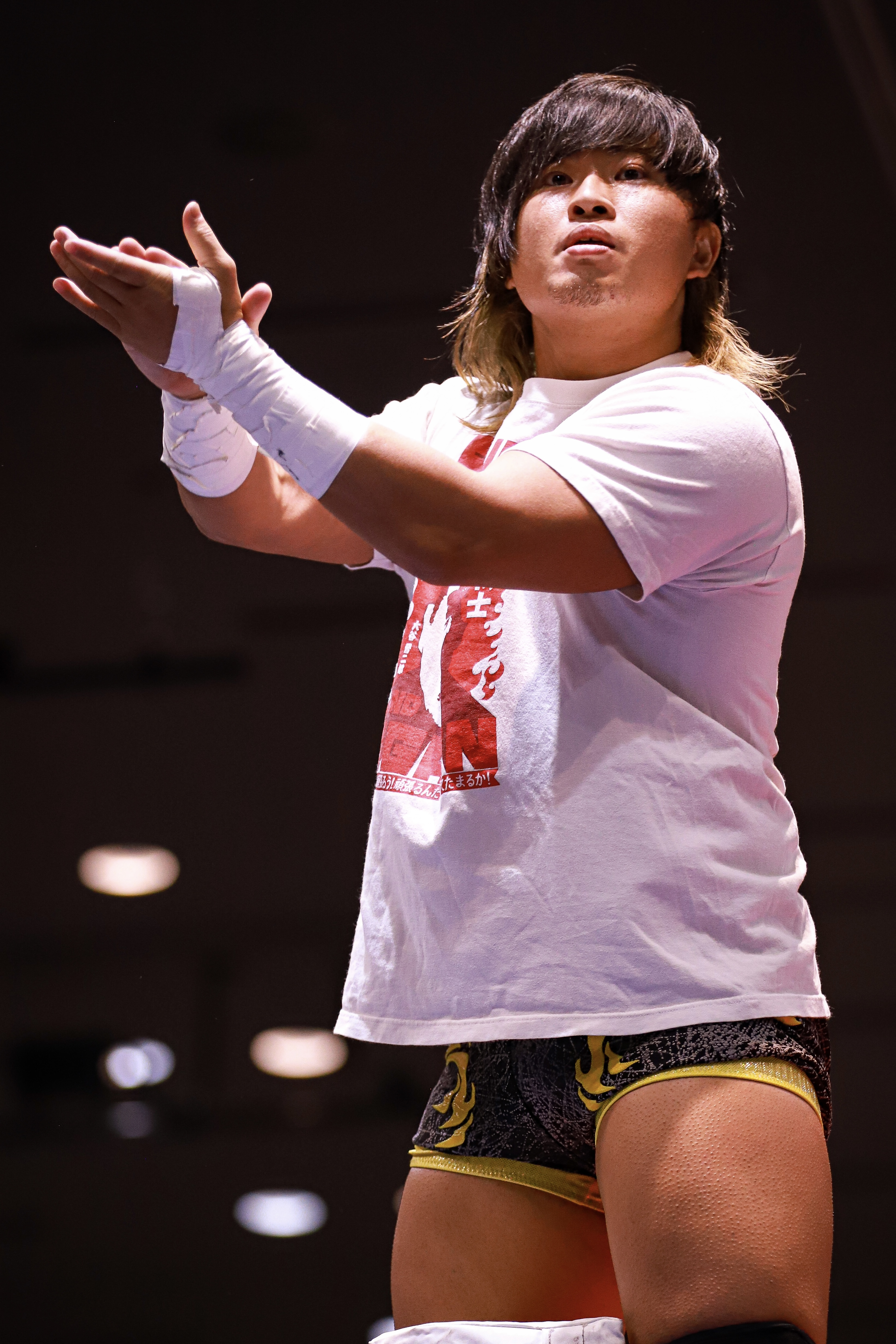
- Matsunaga in May 2023

Personal information
- Born: July 14, 1996 (age 30) Tokorozawa, Saitama, Japan

Professional wrestling career
- Ring name: Junya Matsunaga
- Billed height: 176 cm (5 ft 9 in)
- Billed weight: 94 kg (207 lb)
- Debut: 2021

Junya Matsunaga (松永準也, Matsunaga Junya) is a Japanese professional wrestler currently performing in the Japanese promotion Pro Wrestling Zero1 where he is a current World Heavyweight Champion in his first reign and former Intercontinental Tag Team Champion.

== Professional wrestling career ==
=== Independent circuit (2021–present) ===
Due to partially being a freelancer, Matsunaga is known for competing in various promotions of the Japanese independent scene. He is also known for seldomly competing in various joshi promotions as male talent. At Diana Jaguar's Memorial 61th Birthday & 46th Anniversary, an event promoted by World Woman Pro-Wrestling Diana on July 25, 2022, he teamed up with Satsuki Nagao, Takafumi and Takumi Baba to defeat Tsugutaka Sato, Astroman and Ryo Hoshino in an eight-man tag team match. At Marvelous 6th Anniversary on May 1, 2022, Matsunaga teamed up with Leo Isaka in a losing effort against Shigehiro Irie and Shoki Kitamura.

=== Pro Wrestling Zero1 (2021–present) ===
Matsunaga made his professional wrestling debut in Pro Wrestling Zero1 at ZERO1 Great East Japan Earthquake Reconstruction Charity Show on March 11, 2021, where he fell short to Takafumi in singles competition. During his time in the company, he chased for various championships promoted by it. He won his first title, the Zero1 Intercontinental Tag Team Championship at Shinjiro Otani Debut 30th Anniversary Year & ZERO1 Launch 21st Anniversary Show on March 6, 2022, alongside Takafumi by defeating Gajo and Tomohiko Hashimoto. Despite being a junior heavyweight wrestler, Matsunga competed in a number one contendership match for the Zero1 World Heavyweight Championship at ZERO1 22nd Anniversary where he fell short to Chris Vice. He took part in various match gimmicks such as a battle royal from ZERO1 Earthquake Disaster Reconstruction Dedication Pro-Wrestling on August 26, 2022, bout won by Shoki Kitamura and also involving notable opponents, both male and female such as Aja Kong, Astroman, Fuminori Abe, Masato Tanaka, Ryo Hoshino and Satsuki Nagao, Takafumi, Takumi Baba and Takuya Sugawara.

Matsunaga is known for competing in various of the promotion's signature events. One of them is the Furinkazan, in which he made his first appearance at the 2021 edition where he teamed up with Hartley Jackson and defeated Yumehito Imanari and Yuna Manase in the first rounds, Masato Tanaka and Yasu Kubota in the second ones, but fell short to Tomohiko Hashimoto and Gajo in the finals. At the 2022 edition, he teamed up with Takafumi and defeated Noriyuki Yoshida and Tsugutaka Sato in the first rounds, but fell short to Kubota Brothers (Hide Kubota and Yasu Kubota) in the semifinals. As for the Fire Festival, he made his only appearance at the 2022 edition where he placed himself in the block A, scoring a total of five points after competing against Daisuke Sekimoto, Chris Vice, Takuya Sugawara, Shu Asakawa and Tsugutaka Sato.

==== Big Japan Pro Wrestling (2021–present) ====
One of the promotions he often uses to compete for due to Zero1's shared developmental talent is Big Japan Pro Wrestling. He usually performs in cross over events. One of these junctures was the BJW/ZERO1/2AW Big Clash from April 7, 2021, where he teamed up with Takafumi and Tsugutaka Sato in a losing effort against Hideyoshi Kamitani, Takuho Kato and Takuya Nomura as a result of a six-man tag team match. He continued to make appearances in various anniversary events such as the BJW Daichi Hashimoto 10th Anniversary from December 12, 2021, where he teamed up with Shoki Kitamura, Takafumi and Takumi Baba in a losing effort against Daiki Shimomura, Masato Kamino, Ryota Nakatsu and Takato Nakano.

== Championships and accomplishments ==
- Pro Wrestling Zero1
  - World Heavyweight Championship (1 time, current)
  - Zero1 Intercontinental Tag Team Championship (2 times) – with Takafumi (1) and Tsugutaka Sato (1)
  - Furinkazan (2025) – with Tsugutaka Sato
  - Saikyou Ketteisen Tournament (2026)
  - Fire Festival (2023)
