= Towa Iwasaki =

Japanese professional wrestler

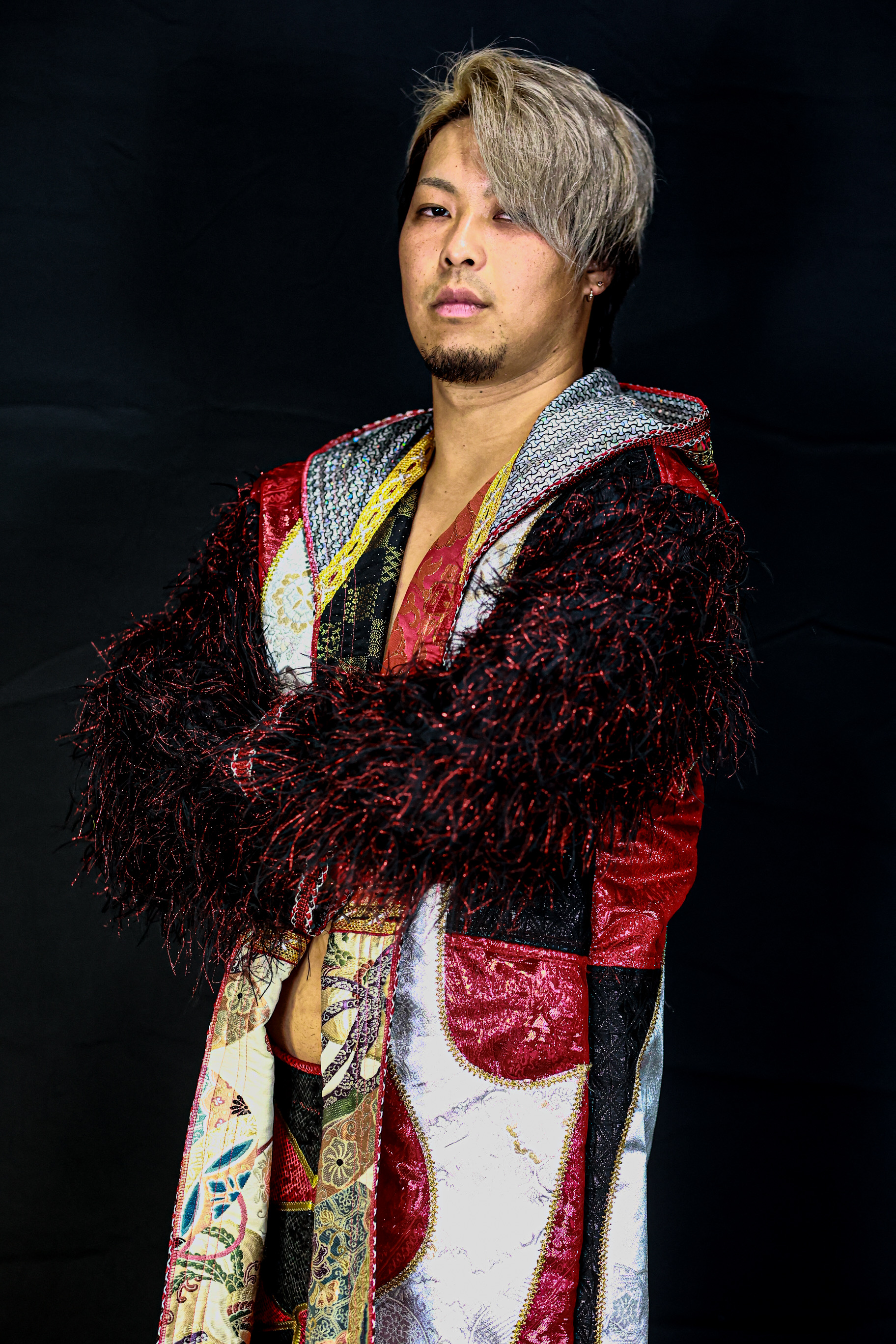
- Iwasaki in May 2021

Personal information
- Born: September 17, 1998 (age 28) Shimane, Japan

Professional wrestling career
- Ring name: Towa Iwasaki
- Billed height: 1.83 m (6 ft 0 in)
- Billed weight: 100 kg (220 lb)
- Debut: 2017

Towa Iwasaki (岩崎永遠, Iwasaki Towa) is a Japanese professional wrestler, currently working for the professional wrestling promotion Pro Wrestling Zero1 (Zero1), where he is a former United National Heavyweight Champion.

== Professional wrestling career ==
=== Independent circuit (2017–present) ===
Iwasaki worked for the defunct Wrestle-1 (W-1) for a brief period of time. On the third night of the W-1 WRESTLE-1 Tour 2019 Sunrise from January 20, he unsuccessfully challenged Kaz Hayashi. At WAVE Niigata WAVE ~ Hiroe Nagahama Local Triumphant, an event promoted by Pro Wrestling Wave on February 4, 2018, he scored a victory against Keisuke Goto.

==== Pro Wrestling Zero1 (2017–present) ====
Iwasaki made his professional wrestling debut at the ZERO1 Ikuto Hidaka Pro-Wrestling Debut 20th Anniversary event from October 13, 2017, promoted by Pro Wrestling Zero1 (Zero1), where he picked up a victory over Shoji Fukushima. At ZERO1 Sayonara West Holy Land Hakata Star Lanes on March 10, 2019, Iwasaki defeated Shogun Okamoto to win the United National Heavyweight Championship. He worked in cross-over events such as BJW/ZERO1 Clash I, a show promoted by both Big Japan Pro Wrestling and Zero1 on April 24, 2019, where he teamed up with Shoki Kitamura and Kohei Sato and fell short to Daisuke Sekimoto & Okami (Daichi Hashimoto and Hideyoshi Kamitani) in a six-man tag team match. At BJW/ZERO1/2AW 3 Groups Joint Performance, a cross-over event promoted by Big Japan Pro Wrestling, Pro Wrestling Zero1 and Active Advance Pro Wrestling on August 11, 2020, Iwasaki teamed up with Takuya Nomura and Tank Nagai in a losing effort to Ayato Yoshida, Daisuke Sekimoto and Masato Tanaka.

He participated in signature events of the promotion. One of them is the Fire Festival, and at the 2018 edition of the event, he placed himself in Block A, scoring a total of ten points after competing against Yuko Miyamoto, Masato Tanaka, Jiro Kuroshio, Shogun Okamoto, Chris Vice and Takuya Sugawara. At the 2019 edition of the event, he scored his best performance by winning the Block B with a total of nineteen points over Yuko Miyamoto, Masashi Takeda, Kohei Sato, Takuya Sugawara, Shogun Okamoto and Yasu Kubota. He lastly fell short in the finals to Yuji Hino.

Another important event promoted by Pro Wrestling Zero1, in which Iwasaki took part, is the Furinkazan Tag Tournament, making his first appearance at the 2019 edition, where he teamed up with Kohei Sato and defeated Yasu Kubota and Hide Kubota in the first round. He then defeated Masato Tanaka and Tetsuhiro Kuroda in the semi-finals but fell short to Yuji Hino and Yuji Okabayashi in the finals. At the 2020 edition, he teamed up with his New Spirits tag team partner, Tsugutaka Sato, but fell short to The Kubota Brothers (Yasu Kubota and Hide Kubota) in the first round on December 19, 2020.

== Personal life ==
Outside of the ring, Iwasaki works as a personal trainer for a fitness center called FLENJI. Ikuto Hidaka owns the gym and employs fellow wrestlers Munenori Sawa and Fuminori Abe.

== Championships and accomplishments ==
- Pro Wrestling Zero1
  - United National Heavyweight Championship (1 time)
  - Intercontinental Tag Team Championship (1 time) – with Tsugutaka Sato
