= United National Heavyweight Championship (Zero1) =

Professional wrestling championship

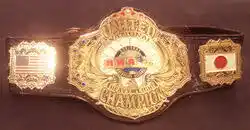
- United National Heavyweight Championship belt

Details
- Promotion: Pro Wrestling Zero1
- Date established: January 31, 2004
- Date retired: May 3, 2020

Other name
- NWA United National Heavyweight Championship
Statistics
- First champion: Masato Tanaka
- Most reigns: Shito Ueda/Masakado (3)
- Longest reign: Kengo Mashimo (937 days)
- Shortest reign: Paul Tracy (2 days)
- Youngest champion: Toshiki Iwaki (20 years, 161 days)
- Heaviest champion: Shogun Okamoto (264 lb)
- Lightest champion: Sean Guinness and Ikuto Hidaka (176 lb)

The United National Heavyweight Championship (often shortened to UN Championship) was a professional wrestling title in the Japanese promotion Pro Wrestling Zero1. It was one of Zero1's top two singles titles, along with the World Heavyweight Championship. The title was created on January 31, 2004 as the NWA United National Heavyweight Championship. Masato Tanaka, then known as Masa Tanaka, defeated Steve Corino in an Indian strap match to become the first champion. It was created at a time when Zero1 was a member of the National Wrestling Alliance (NWA); when Zero1 departed the NWA in late 2004, NWA ceased recognizing or sanctioning it, though it retained the NWA initials. The title was revived by NWA Pro Wrestling in 2011, with NWA beginning to sanction title matches in Zero1 that same year after Zero1 was reinstated as a member of the NWA. NWA stopped sanctioning the title and the NWA initials were dropped after Zero1 left the NWA again later in 2011. In 2020, the championship was retired. There were a total of 26 recognized champions who had a combined 32 official reigns.

== Title history ==
Key
No.	Overall reign number
Reign	Reign number for the specific champion
Days	Number of days held
Defenses	Number of successful defenses
<1	Reign lasted less than a day
+	Current reign is changing daily

No.	Champion	Championship change			Reign statistics			Notes	Ref.
No.	Champion	Date	Event	Location	Reign	Days	Defenses	Notes	Ref.
(NWA) National Wrestling Alliance / Pro Wrestling Zero1 (Zero1)
1	Masa Tanaka	January 31, 2004	U$A – Day 2	Tokyo, Japan	1	251	5	Defeated Steve Corino in an Indian strap match.	
Pro Wrestling Zero1 (Zero1)
2	Takao Omori	October 8, 2004	New Whirlpool-1 Truth II 2004 – Day 3	Tokyo, Japan	1	107	1	This was a steel cage match.	
—	Vacated	January 23, 2005	—	—	—	—	—	Vacated due to Omori winning the World Heavyweight Championship of AWA Superstars of Wrestling.	
3	C. W. Anderson	March 27, 2005	MAX Strong Wind & Thunder – Day 5	Tokyo, Japan	1	313	0	Defeated Kohei Sato.	
—	Vacated	February 3, 2006	—	—	—	—	—	Vacated due to a back injury.	
4	Kohei Sato	February 26, 2006	Happening – Day 5	Tokyo, Japan	1	258	5	Defeated Ryouji Sai.	
5	Ryouji Sai	November 11, 2006	Max Around '06 – Day 8	Osaka, Japan	1	117	1		
6	Daisuke Sekimoto	March 8, 2007	Max Satisfaction – Day 1: Ex-Impact	Tokyo, Japan	1	250	3		
7	Yoshihito Sasaki	November 13, 2007	Believe Your Way 2007 – Day 8 – Shinjiro Otani, Takao Omori, Tatsuhito Takaiwa & Kamikaze 15th Anniversary	Tokyo, Japan	1	90	1		
8	Sandy Beach	February 11, 2008	Solidarity – Day 3	Nagoya, Japan	1	47	0		
9	Yoshihito Sasaki	March 29, 2008	Whirlwind – Day 7	Sapporo, Japan	2	27	0		
—	Vacated	April 25, 2008	—	—	—	—	—	Vacated due to injury.	
10	Kengo Mashimo	May 4, 2008	Kaientai Dojo's GWSP6 2008 – Day 4: Kengo Mashimo Produce	Chiba, Japan	1	937	2	Defeated Ryouji Sai.	
—	Vacated	November 27, 2010	—	—	—	—	—	Vacated due to inactivity.	
(NWA) National Wrestling Alliance / Pro Wrestling Zero1 (Zero1)
11	Hartley Jackson	February 19, 2011	NWA Pro Australia: Meltdown 2011	Adelaide, Australia	1	263	8	Defeated Robby Heart to become the new NWA United National Heavyweight Champion.	
12	Shito Ueda	November 9, 2011	Yarisugi Forever II	Tokyo, Japan	1	13	0		
13	Paul Tracy	November 22, 2011	God's of Shimane Country Tour 2011 – Day 1	Matsue, Japan	1	2	0		
14	Shito Ueda	November 24, 2011	God's of Shimane Country Tour 2011 – Day 3	Kumamoto, Japan	2	255	4		
15	Yusaku Obata	August 5, 2012	Midsummer Festival ~ Fire Festival 2012 – Day 11	Tokyo, Japan	1	72	0		
16	James Raideen	October 16, 2012	World	Tokyo, Japan	1	257	1		
Pro Wrestling Zero1 (Zero1)
17	Ikuto Hidaka	June 30, 2013	Fusion	Nagoya, Japan	1	30	0		
18	Zeus	July 30, 2013	Fire Festival (2013) – Day 8	Osaka, Japan	1	170	0		
19	Tama Williams	January 16, 2014	Live event	Tokyo, Japan	1	199	2		
20	Hideki Suzuki	August 3, 2014	Fire Festival (2014)	Tokyo, Japan	1	275	2		
21	Kamikaze	May 5, 2015	Live event	Tokyo, Japan	1	141	2		
22	Toshiki Iwaki	September 23, 2015	Live Event	Tokyo, Japan	1	39	0	Won the match by disqualification; awarded the title by referee Katsumi Sasazaki, who was assaulted by Kamikaze during the match.	
23	Kamikaze	November 1, 2015	Live Event	Tokyo, Japan	2	22	0		
24	Yoshikazu Yokoyama	November 23, 2015	Live Event	Tokyo, Japan	1	26	0		
25	Masakado	December 19, 2015	Live Event	Tokyo, Japan	3	190	3	Masakado previously held the title under the name Shito Ueda.	
26	Buffa	June 26, 2016	Super Fireworks Captain Super Fireworks	Kakegawa, Japan	1	133	1		
27	Hartley Jackson	November 6, 2016	Kohei Sato 15th Anniversary Show	Tokyo, Japan	2	116	0	This was a three-way match, also involving Kamikaze.	
28	Sean Guinness	March 2, 2017	Shinsei Zero1 Dream Series ~ Birthday Party	Tokyo, Japan	1	182	0		
—	Vacated	August 31, 2017	—	—	—	—	—	Guinness relinquished the title to focus on wrestling as a junior heavyweight.	
29	Super Tiger	September 30, 2017	Shinjiro Otani & Tatsuhito Takaiwa 25th Anniversary Convention	Tokyo, Japan	1	190	3	Defeated Hartley Jackson to win the vacant title.	
29	Chris Vice	April 8, 2018	15th Yasukuni Shrine Festival	Tokyo, Japan	1	56	1		
30	Shogun Okamoto	June 3, 2018	Shinsei Zero1 Sapporo First Landing ~ No Gravity Warrior Sugi Sapporo First Visit	Sapporo, Japan	1	280	2		
31	Towa Iwasaki	March 10, 2019	Sayonara West Holy Land Hakata Star Lanes	Fukuoka, Japan	1	314	3		
32	Chris Vice	January 18, 2020	Skill Up To The Future ~ Towards A Dream	Tokyo, Japan	2	106	0		
—	Deactivated	May 3, 2020	—	—	—	—	—	Vacated due to Vice winning the World Heavyweight Championship; title abandoned.	

== Combined reigns ==
As of June 7, 2025.

†	Indicates the current champion

Rank	Wrestler	No. of reigns	Combined defenses	Combined days
1	Kengo Mashimo	1	2	937
2	Shito Ueda/Masakado	3	7	458
3	Hartley Jackson	2	8	379
4	Towa Iwasaki	1	3	314
5	C. W. Anderson	1	0	313
6	Shogun Okamoto	1	2	280
7	Hideki Suzuki	1	2	275
8	Kohei Sato	1	5	258
9	James Raideen	1	1	257
10	Masato Tanaka	1	5	251
11	Daisuke Sekimoto	1	3	250
12	Tama Williams	1	2	199
13	Super Tiger	1	3	190
14	Sean Guinness	1	0	182
15	Zeus	1	0	170
16	Kamikaze	2	2	163
17	Buffa	1	1	133
18	Ryouji Sai	1	1	117
18	Yoshihito Sasaki	2	1	117
20	Takao Omori	1	1	107
21	Chris Vice	2	1	106
22	Yusaku Obata	1	0	72
23	Sandy Beach	1	0	47
24	Toshiki Iwaki	1	0	39
25	Ikuto Hidaka	1	0	30
26	Yoshikazu Yokoyama	1	0	26
27	Paul Tracy	1	0	2

== See also ==
- List of National Wrestling Alliance championships
- IWGP United States Championship
- IWGP Intercontinental Championship
- PWF World Asia Heavyweight Championship
- PWF Gaora Television Heavyweight Championship
- GHC National Championship
