= Atsushi Sawada =

Japanese alpine skier (born 1958)

Personal information
- Nationality: Japanese
- Born: 2 August 1958 (age 66); Aomori, Japan

Sport
- Sport: Alpine skiing

Atsushi Sawada (沢田 敦, Sawada Atsushi, born 2 August 1958) is a Japanese alpine skier. He competed in two events at the 1980 Winter Olympics.
