= Yoshikazu Yokoyama =

Japanese professional wrestler

Personal information
- Born: 22 March 1988 (age 38) Okayama, Japan

Professional wrestling career
- Ring name: Yoshikazu Yokoyama
- Billed height: 178 cm (5 ft 10 in)
- Billed weight: 98 kg (216 lb)
- Trained by: Animal Hamaguchi
- Debut: 2010

Yoshikazu Yokoyama (横山佳和, Yokoyama Yoshikazu) is a Japanese professional wrestler signed to Pro Wrestling Zero1 where he is a former United National Heavyweight Champion. He is also known for his tenures with Big Japan Pro Wrestling (BJW), Active Advance Pro Wrestling (2AW) and other promotions from the Japanese independent scene.

== Professional wrestling career ==
=== Pro Wrestling Zero1 (2010–present) ===
Yokoyama made his professional wrestling debut in Zero1 at ZERO1 Wrestler's, a house show from February 28, 2010, where he fell short to Yuzuru Saito in singles competition. During his time in the promotion, Yokoyama chased for various accomplishments and was part of the Voodoo Murders and Real Zero1 stables. He won the first title of his career, the United National Heavyweight Championship at a house show from November 23, 2015, by defeating Kamikaze.

Yokoyama competed in various of the promotion's signature events. In the Fire Festival, he made his first appearance in the 2014 edition of the tournament where he placed himself in the B block and scored a total of two points after competing Kohei Sato, Daemon Ueda, Masato Tanaka, Shinjiro Otani and Kazuki Hashimoto. He returned to the tournament after a six-year absence at the 2020 edition where he scored a total of thirteen points in the A block, failing to qualify for the finals after competing against Hartley Jackson, T-Hawk, Quiet Storm, Takuya Sugawara and Towa Iwasaki.

As for the Furinkazan, Yokoyama made his first appearance at the 2011 edition of the tournament in which he teamed up with Shinjiro Otani, topped the A block with a total of six points, but fell short to Fujita Hayato and Masato Tanaka in the finals. He scored his best result at the 2023 edition where he emerged victorious by teaming up with Masato Tanaka and defeating Ryota Hama and Yuki Toki in the first rounds, Ryo Hoshino and Shingo in the second ones, and Leo Isaka and Shoki Kitamura in the finals.

In the Tenkaichi Junior, Yokoyama made his only appearance in the 2022 edition where he placed himself in the B block and scored a total of eight points after competing against Shoki Kitamura, Jun Masaoka, Leo Isaka and Astroman.

==== Big Japan Pro Wrestling (2019–2023) ====
Yokoyama often competed in Big Japan Pro Wrestling due to Zero1's relationships with the promotion, mainly in cross-over events. He made his first appearance of this kind at BJW/ZERO1 Clash II on August 5, 2019, where he fell short to Daichi Hashimoto.

=== Japanese independent circuit (2011–present) ===
Yokoyama often competes for various of the Japanese independent scene promotions as a Zero1 talent. At 2AW Infinity ~ 2022 Winter, an event promoted by Active Advance Pro Wrestling on February 23, 2022, he teamed up with Chris Vice to defeat The Rule (Ayato Yoshida and The Andrew King Takuma) for the 2AW Tag Team Championship. This represented Yokoyama's first title won outside of Zero1.

Yokoyama also shared a brief tenure with Pro Wrestling Noah. He made his first appearance in a Noah-sanctioned event at Noah Grand Ship In Yokohama on June 16, 2024, where he teamed up with "Real Zero1" stablemates Chris Vice, Satsuki Nagao and Kubota Brothers (Hide Kubota and Yasu Kubota) to defeat Team Noah (Muhammad Yone, Atsushi Kotoge, Akitoshi Saito, Hi69 and Go Shiozaki). At NOAH Limit Break ex. on December 22, 2024, he teamed up with Masato Tanaka and Takuya Sugawara to defeat Hajime Ohara, Kohei Kinoshita and Shuhei Taniguchi in six-man tag team competition.

== Championships and accomplishments ==
- Active Advance Pro Wrestling
  - 2AW Tag Team Championship (1 time) – with Chris Vice
- Pro Wrestling Zero1
  - United National Heavyweight Championship (1 time)
  - Furinkazan (2023) – with Masato Tanaka
