= World Heavyweight Championship (Zero1) =

Professional wrestling championship

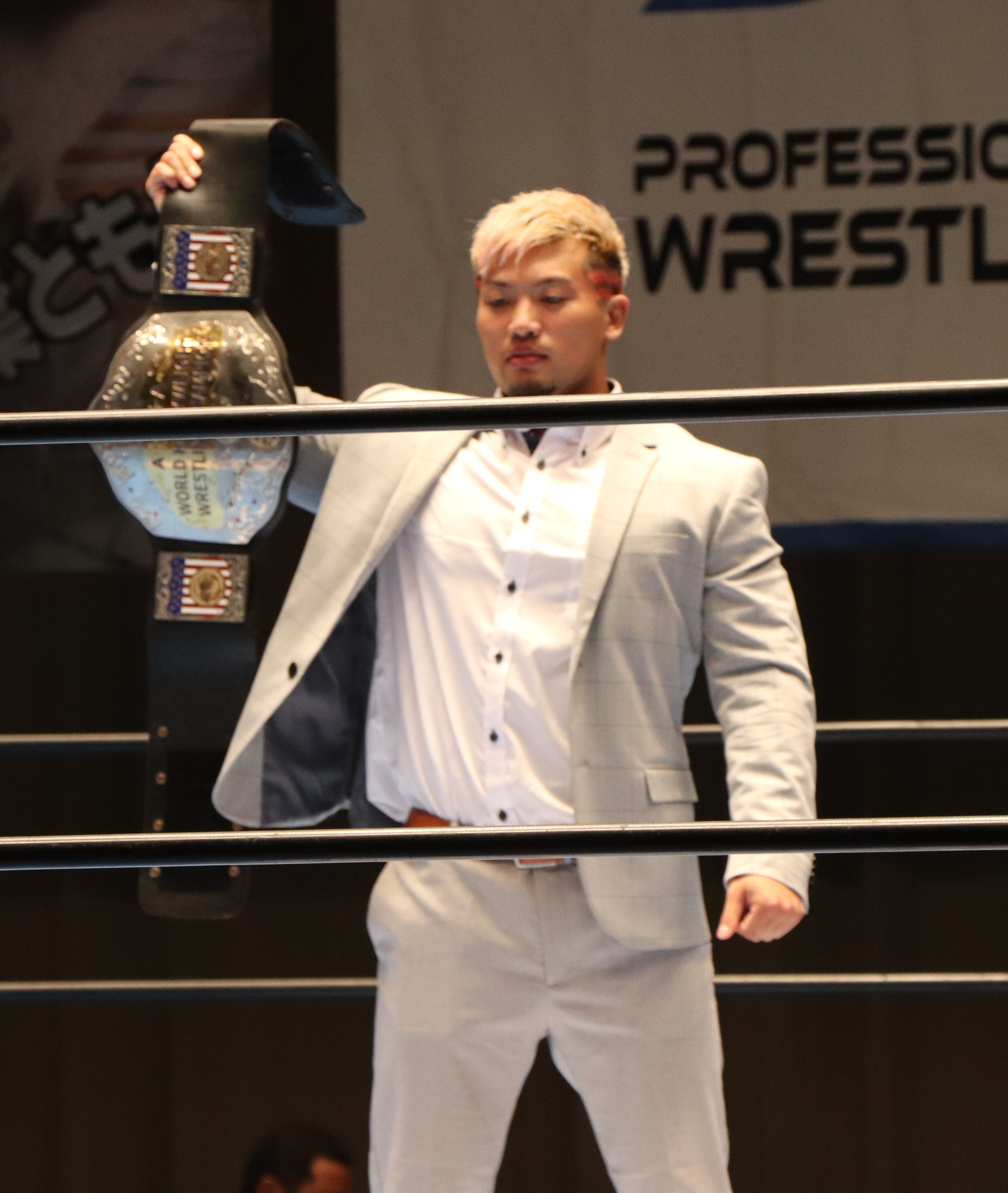
- Hayato Tamura with the current belt design in September 2020

Details
- Promotion: Pro Wrestling Zero1 (2007–present); Pro Wrestling Noah (2021–present)
- Date established: October 26, 2007
- Current champion: Junya Matsunaga
- Date won: April 3, 2026

Other names
- AWA World Heavyweight Championship (2007; 2011); Zero1-Max World Heavyweight Championship (2007–2008); Zero1 World Heavyweight Championship (2008–2011; 2011–present)
Statistics
- First champion: Masato Tanaka
- Most reigns: Masato Tanaka (7 reigns)
- Longest reign: Kohei Sato (408 days)
- Shortest reign: Shinjiro Otani and Kamikaze (30 days)
- Oldest champion: Akitoshi Saito (58 years, 7 months and 23 days)
- Youngest champion: Hayato Tamura (24 years, 11 months and 15 days)

The World Heavyweight Championship is a professional wrestling world heavyweight championship in the Japanese promotion Pro Wrestling Zero1. It is Zero1's top singles title. It was first introduced on December 15, 2007 when Zero1 ended their relationship with the AWA Superstars of Wrestling. The AWA Superstars of Wrestling Champion at the time, Masato Tanaka, was then recognized as the first Zero1 World Heavyweight Champion. To this day, Zero1 continues to use the AWA title belt, which reads "AWA World Heavyweight Wrestling Champion", to represent their world heavyweight championship.

There have been a total of 22 recognized champions who have had a combined 36 official reigns. Junya Matsunaga is the current champion in his seventh reign. He defeated Masato Tanaka to win the title at the ZERO1 25th Anniversary Show on April 3, 2026. This is his first title reign, and at the time was the Co-Holder of the Intercontinental Tag Team Championship (Zero1) with Tsugutaka Sato, becoming a Double Champion.

== Title history ==
Key
No.	Overall reign number
Reign	Reign number for the specific champion
Days	Number of days held
Defenses	Number of successful defenses
+	Current reign is changing daily

No.	Champion	Championship change			Reign statistics			Notes	Ref.
No.	Champion	Date	Event	Location	Reign	Days	Defenses	Notes	Ref.
Pro Wrestling Zero1
1	Masato Tanaka	October 26, 2007	Innovation	Tokyo, Japan	1	353	6	Tanaka defeated Takao Omori on October 26, 2007 to win the World Heavyweight Championship of AWA Superstars of Wrestling; Zero1 ended their business relationship with AWA Superstars of Wrestling on December 15, 2007 and the AWA championship was replaced with the Zero1-Max World Heavyweight Championship. In 2008, the promotion shortened its name to Pro Wrestling Zero1 and the championship's name changed to the "Zero1 World Heavyweight Championship".	
2	Yuji Nagata	October 13, 2008	New Japan Pro-Wrestling's Destruction '08	Tokyo, Japan	1	137	3		
3	Shinjiro Otani	February 27, 2009	Wrestler's Belief	Tokyo, Japan	1	30	2		
4	Ryouji Sai	March 29, 2009	Wrestler's Belief	Tokyo, Japan	1	94	1		
5	Masato Tanaka	July 1, 2009	Wrestler's 4	Tokyo, Japan	2	115	0		
6	Toshiaki Kawada	October 24, 2009	Wrestler's 6: Never Gonna Stop!	Tokyo, Japan	1	169	3		
7	Kohei Sato	April 11, 2010	Celebration from the Yasukuni Shrine "Yamato Shinshu Chikara Matsuri"	Tokyo, Japan	1	91	2		
8	Bambikiller	July 11, 2010	ZERO ONE Knight STAND	Tokyo, Japan	1	60	0		
9	Daisuke Sekimoto	September 9, 2010	Euro Vintage Action	Tokyo, Japan	1	178	4		
10	Ryouji Sai	March 6, 2011	10th Anniversary	Tokyo, Japan	2	119	2	The championship is renamed to the "AWA World Heavyweight Championship" during this reign.	
11	The Sheik	July 3, 2011	Destructive King 7th Anniversary of Death Commemoration	Tokyo, Japan	1	126	2	This match was also for The Sheik's NWA World Heavyweight Championship.	
12	Kohei Sato	November 6, 2011	Yarisugi Forever I	Tokyo, Japan	2	87	2	The championship's name reverts back to the "Zero1 World Heavyweight Championship" during this reign.	
13	Kamikaze	February 1, 2012	ZERO1 Action 2012	Tokyo, Japan	1	30	0		
14	Akebono	March 2, 2012	11th Anniversary Show	Tokyo, Japan	1	193	2		
—	Vacated	September 11, 2012	—	—	—	—	—		
15	James Raideen	August 4, 2013	Fire Festival 2013: Final Day	Tokyo, Japan	1	238	4	Defeated Masato Tanaka in the finals of the 2013 Fire Festival to win the vacant title.	
16	Kohei Sato	March 30, 2014	11th Yamato Shinshu Chikara Matsuri	Tokyo, Japan	3	98	1		
17	Masakatsu Funaki	July 6, 2014	Wrestle-1's Shōgeki: Impact	Tokyo, Japan	1	75	1		
18	Kohei Sato	September 19, 2014	Tenkaichi Special	Tokyo, Japan	4	408	4		
19	Hideki Suzuki	November 1, 2015	Live event	Tokyo, Japan	1	147	2		
20	Kohei Sato	March 27, 2016	Live event	Tokyo, Japan	5	364	3		
21	Masato Tanaka	March 26, 2017	14th Yamato Shinshu Chikara Matsuri	Tokyo, Japan	3	281	4		
22	Yusaku Obata	January 1, 2018	Kinga Shinnen	Tokyo, Japan	1	153	4		
23	Masato Tanaka	June 3, 2018	Shinsei Zero1 Sapporo First Landing ~ No Gravity Warrior Sugi Sapporo First Visit	Sapporo, Japan	4	174	0		
24	Daisuke Sekimoto	November 24, 2018	ZERO1 Dream Series ~ Nenotsuki No Jin ~ Tenka-Ichi Junior Tournament 2018	Tokyo, Japan	2	294	6		
25	Yuji Hino	September 14, 2019	16th ZERO1 Tenka-Ichi Championship Decision 2019	Tokyo, Japan	1	169	4		
26	Kohei Sato	March 1, 2020	19th Anniversary Show	Tokyo, Japan	6	63	0		
27	Chris Vice	May 3, 2020	Chojin Matsuri In Samurai! TV	Tokyo, Japan	1	116	2		
28	Hayato Tamura	August 27, 2020	New ZERO1	Tokyo, Japan	1	127	2		
29	Masato Tanaka	January 1, 2021	ZERO1 Happy New Year 2021	Tokyo, Japan	5	226	1		
Pro Wrestling Noah
30	Takashi Sugiura	August 15, 2021	Pro Wrestling Noah's Kawasaki GO!	Kawasaki, Japan	1	293	3	This was a Winner Takes All match, in which Sugiura also defended the GHC National Championship.	
31	Masato Tanaka	June 4, 2022	Osu Premium One Team ZERO1 Shinjiro Otani Aid! Get Up As Many Times As You Want	Tokyo, Japan	6	356	3		
32	Chris Vice	May 26, 2023	ZERO1 Fibromyalgia Charity Show	Tokyo, Japan	2	310	2		
33	Akitoshi Saito	March 31, 2024	ZERO1 Noto Peninsula Earthquake Charity Pro Wrestling	Tokyo, Japan	1	104	3		
34	Go Shiozaki	July 13, 2024	Noah Destination 2024	Tokyo, Japan	1	457	3		
—	Vacated	October 13, 2025	—	—	—	—	—	Vacated due to Go Shiozaki's departure from Pro Wrestling Noah	
35	Masato Tanaka	November 10, 2025	First Advance To The Holy Land	Tokyo, Japan	7	144	1	Defeated Atsushi Kotoge to win the vacant title	
36	Junya Matsunaga	April 3, 2026	ZERO1 25th Anniversary	Tokyo, Japan	1	182+	1		

== Combined reigns ==
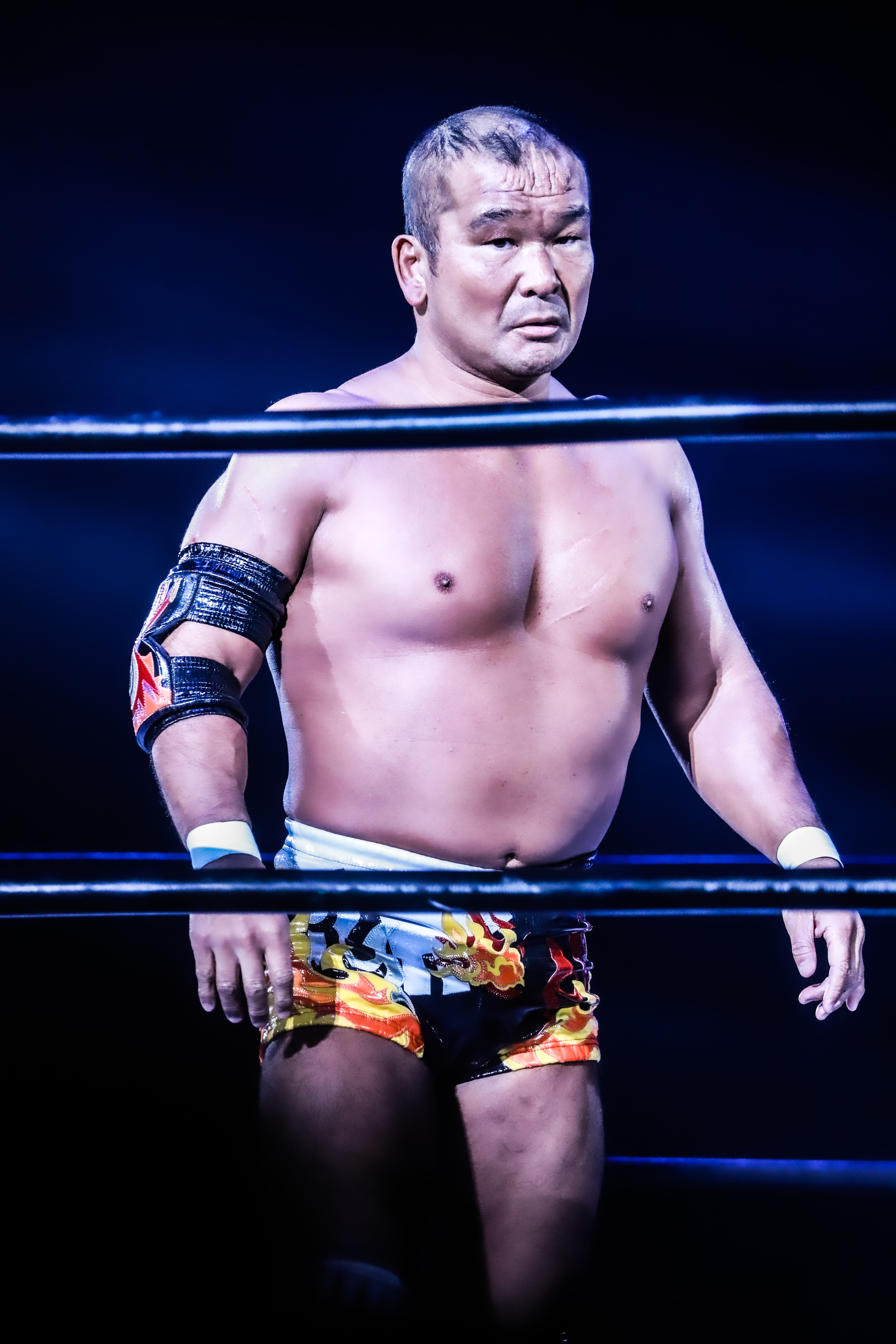
Record seven-time champion, Masato Tanaka

As of October 2, 2026.

†	Indicates the current champion

Rank	Wrestler	No. of reigns	Combined defenses	Combined days
1	Masato Tanaka	7	15	1,649
2	Kohei Sato	6	12	1,111
3	Daisuke Sekimoto	2	10	472
4	Go Shiozaki	1	3	457
5	Chris Vice	2	4	426
6	Takashi Sugiura	1	3	293
7	James Raideen	1	4	238
8	Ryouji Sai	2	3	213
9	Akebono	1	2	193
10	Toshiaki Kawada	1	3	169
10	Yuji Hino	1	4	169
12	Junya Matsunaga †	1	1	182+
13	Yusaku Obata	1	4	153
14	Hideki Suzuki	1	2	147
15	Yuji Nagata	1	3	137
16	Hayato Tamura	1	2	127
17	The Sheik	1	2	126
18	Akitoshi Saito	1	3	104
19	Masakatsu Funaki	1	1	75
20	Bambikiller	1	0	60
21	Kamikaze	1	0	30
21	Shinjiro Otani	1	2	30

== Belt design ==
The standard Championship belt has three plates on a black leather strap.

== See also ==
- GHC Heavyweight Championship
- IWGP Heavyweight Championship
- Triple Crown Heavyweight Championship
- NWA Worlds Heavyweight Championship

Sporting positions
Preceded by AWA World Heavyweight Championship	Pro Wrestling Zero1's top heavyweight championship 2007–present	Succeeded by Current
