= Kirinowaka Tarō =

Japanese wrestler (born 1983)

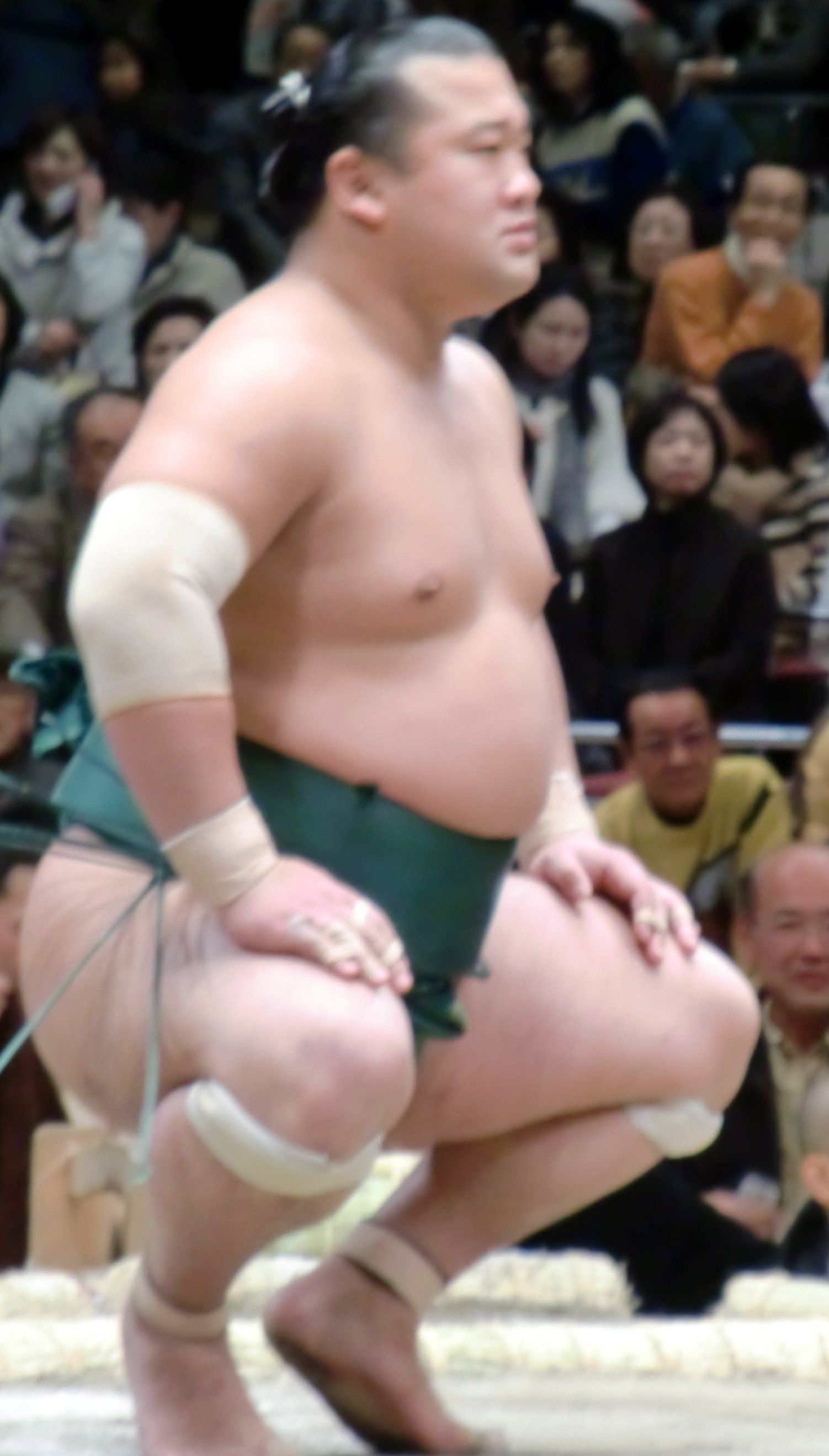

Personal information
- Native name: 霧の若 太郎
- Born: Masayuki Okamoto; 18 September 1983 (age 43) Chōyō, Kumamoto
- Height: 1.77 m (5 ft 9 1/2 in)
- Weight: 123 kg (271 lb)

Sport
- Sport: Sumo
- Retired: May 2011
- Heya: Michinoku
- Record: 310-291-0
- Debut: March 1999
- Highest rank: Jūryō 4 (September 2009)
- Updated on September 2012

Masayuki Okamoto (岡本 将之, Okamoto Masayuki; born 18 September 1983) is a former sumo wrestler and current professional wrestler from Chōyō, Kumamoto, Japan. In sumo, he used the shikona Kirinowaka Tarō (霧の若 太郎, Kirinowaka Tarō), while in professional wrestling he is known by the ring name Shogun Okamoto (将軍岡本, Shōgun Okamoto).

== Career ==
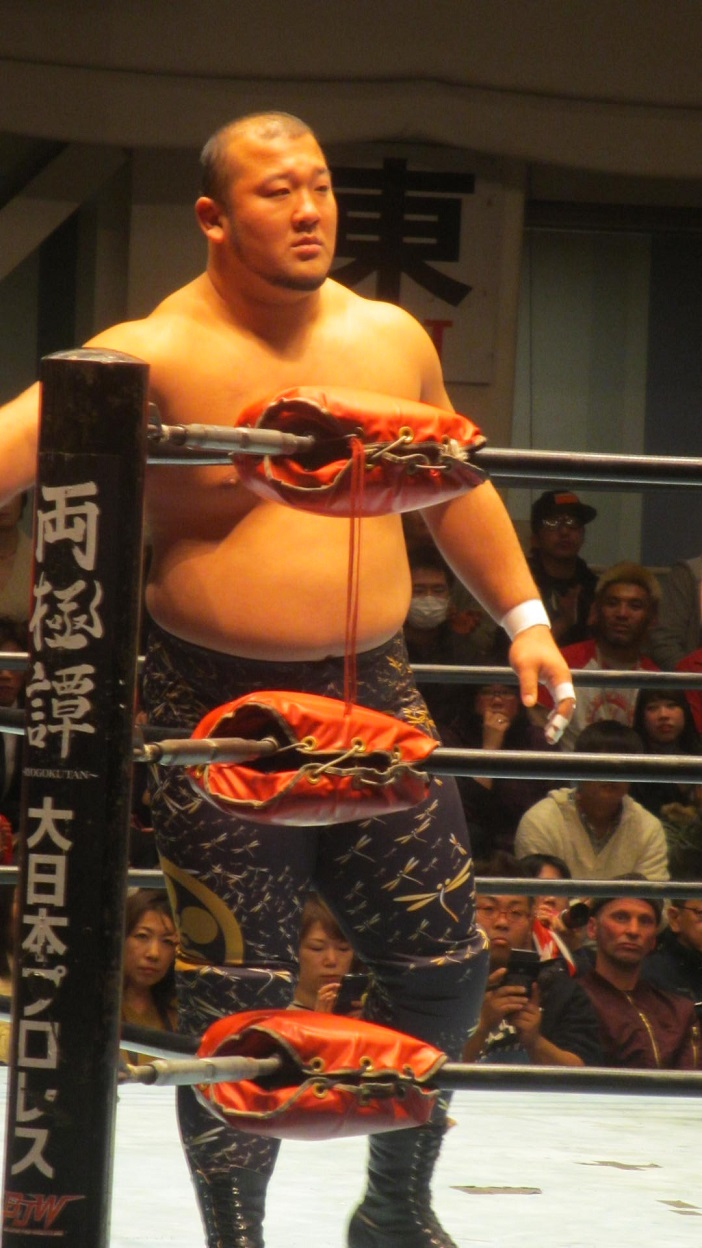
As a professional wrestler

His parents ran a yakiniku restaurant. In junior high school Okamoto did judo and participated in prefectural competitions in the third grade. Amongst his opponents was the future top division sumo wrestler Chiyohakuho. Although he had no experience in sumo, he was spotted by scouts from the Michinoku stable and recommended to its stablemaster, ex ōzeki Kirishima. Okamoto was not aware of Kirishima's sumo career but was convinced by his passion for sumo to join Michinoku stable. He made his professional debut in March 1999. He scored six wins against just one loss in his first official tournament. He came close to promotion to the sekitori level in May 2006 with a 4–3 record at makushita #3 but missed out and had to wait until November 2007 when a 5–2 at makushita #4 earned him promotion to the jūryō division. He was the first member of Michinoku stable to do so since ex-Kirishima took over the stable in 1997. In his jūryō debut in January 2008 he lost eight bouts in the first ten days but then recovered to win his last five matches in a row. However, after losing scores in three tournaments from January to May 2010 he was demoted back to makushita. He never reached the top division, and the highest rank he achieved was jūryō 4. His career record over 72 tournaments was 310 wins against 291 losses.

== Retirement from sumo ==
He was forced to retire by the Japan Sumo Association in April 2011, after an investigation showed his name had appeared in text messages along with several other wrestlers who were prepared to throw bouts. In January 2012 he became a professional wrestler with a ring name of Shogun Okamoto and joined the Inoki Genome Federation. In February 2012 he won his first match, defeating Bob Sapp. In October 2013 he formed a tag team with another former sumo wrestler, Wakakirin. He left IGF in March 2016 and went freelance. In July he joined Akebono and Ryota Hama's tag team "SMOP", as part of which he won his first title, the NWA Intercontinental Tag Team Championship, in February 2017.

His parents' home was destroyed in the 2016 Kumamoto earthquakes, although no one was injured.

== Fighting style ==
Wakakirin's favourite techniques were tsuppari (a series of rapid thrusts to the opponent's chest) and yori (force out). When fighting on the mawashi or belt he preferred a hidari-yotsu (right hand outside, left hand inside) grip.

== Career record ==
Kirinowaka Tarō
Year	January Hatsu basho, Tokyo	March Haru basho, Osaka	May Natsu basho, Tokyo	July Nagoya basho, Nagoya	September Aki basho, Tokyo	November Kyūshū basho, Fukuoka
1999	x	(Maezumo)	West Jonokuchi #32; 6–1	East Jonidan #95; 2–5	West Jonidan #119; 3–4	East Jonidan #135; 6–1
2000	East Jonidan #54; 2–5	West Jonidan #79; 5–2	West Jonidan #34; 3–4	East Jonidan #53; 4–3	East Jonidan #33; 3–4	East Jonidan #52; 5–2
2001	East Jonidan #12; 5–2	East Sandanme #77; 6–1	East Sandanme #21; 3–4	East Sandanme #35; 4–3	West Sandanme #20; 4–3	East Sandanme #9; 3–4
2002	East Sandanme #22; 4–3	East Sandanme #11; 3–4	West Sandanme #28; 4–3	East Sandanme #13; 5–2	West Makushita #51; 2–5	East Sandanme #12; 5–2
2003	East Makushita #50; 2–5	East Sandanme #13; 3–4	East Sandanme #26; 5–2	West Sandanme #2; 4–3	West Makushita #51; 3–4	West Sandanme #4; 4–3
2004	West Makushita #50; 3–4	West Makushita #57; 6–1	West Makushita #26; 4–3	West Makushita #22; 4–3	East Makushita #18; 2–5	West Makushita #31; 4–3
2005	West Makushita #25; 4–3	West Makushita #20; 4–3	West Makushita #14; 2–5	West Makushita #25; 3–4	West Makushita #32; 4–3	West Makushita #25; 5–2
2006	East Makushita #15; 5–2	West Makushita #6; 5–2	East Makushita #3; 4–3	East Makushita #2; 3–4	West Makushita #5; 2–5	East Makushita #17; 3–4
2007	East Makushita #23; 4–3	East Makushita #18; 5–2	West Makushita #11; 6–1	East Makushita #4; 3–4	West Makushita #7; 4–3	West Makushita #4; 5–2
2008	East Jūryō #13; 7–8	West Jūryō #13; 8–7	East Jūryō #12; 8–7	West Jūryō #8; 6–9	East Jūryō #13; 3–12	East Makushita #6; 5–2
2009	East Makushita #2; 5–2	West Jūryō #14; 8–7	East Jūryō #12; 9–6	West Jūryō #8; 8–7	West Jūryō #4; 5–10	East Jūryō #10; 8–7
2010	West Jūryō #8; 6–9	East Jūryō #12; 7–8	East Jūryō #13; 2–13	East Makushita #14; 2–5	West Makushita #27; 4–3	East Makushita #23; 4–3
2011	East Makushita #19; 3–4	Tournament Cancelled; 0–0–0	East Makushita #28; Retired –	x	x	x
Record given as wins–losses–absences Top division champion Top division runner-up Retired Lower divisions Non-participation Sanshō key: F=Fighting spirit; O=Outstanding performance; T=Technique Also shown: ★=Kinboshi; P=Playoff(s); Divisions: Makuuchi — Jūryō — Makushita — Sandanme — Jonidan — Jonokuchi Makuuchi ranks: Yokozuna — Ōzeki — Sekiwake — Komusubi — Maegashira

== Championships and accomplishments ==
=== Professional wrestling ===
- Big Japan Pro Wrestling
  - Yokohama Shopping Street 6-Man Tag Team Championship (1 time) – with Ryota Hama and Yasufumi Nakanoue
- Pro Wrestling Zero1
  - NWA Intercontinental Tag Team Championship (2 times) – with Akebono (1) and Yutaka Yoshie (1)
  - NWA United National Heavyweight Championship (1 time)
  - Furinkazan Tag Tournament (2017) – with Yutaka Yoshie
- Real Japan Pro Wrestling
  - UWA Asia Pacific Heavyweight Championship (2 times, current)

== See also ==
- Glossary of sumo terms
- List of past sumo wrestlers
