= Yutaka Yoshie =

Japanese professional wrestler (1974–2024)

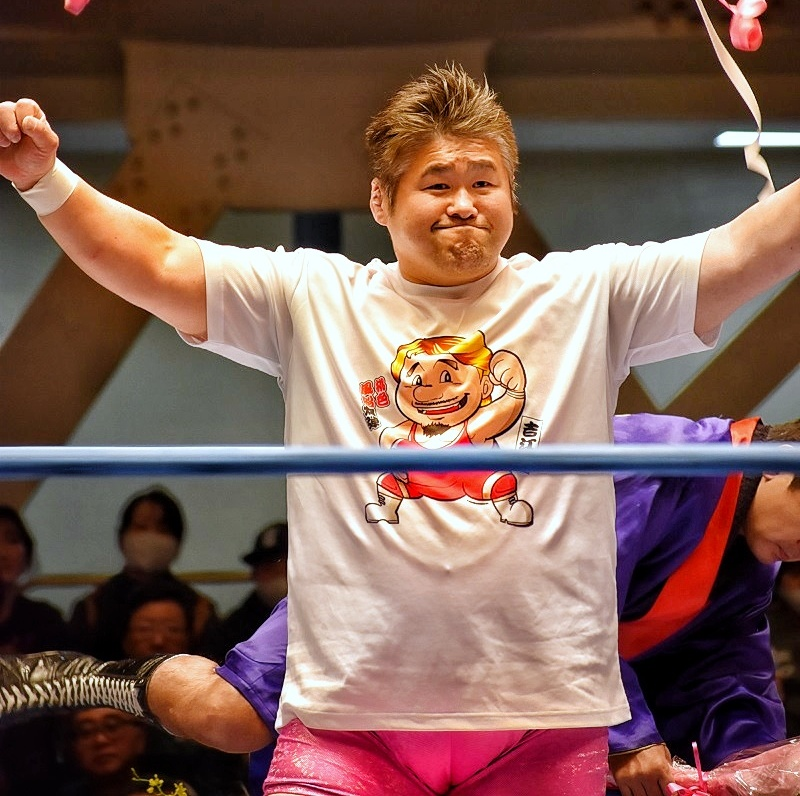
- Yoshie in 2020

Personal information
- Born: January 5, 1974 Maebashi, Gunma, Japan
- Died: March 10, 2024 (aged 50) Takasaki, Gunma, Japan

Professional wrestling career
- Ring name(s): 4L Blazer; Great Kabuki; Pink Strong Machine; Y2P 150kg Y2P–160kg; Yoshie–chan; Yutaka Yoshie
- Billed height: 1.80 m (5 ft 11 in)
- Billed weight: 150 kg (331 lb)
- Trained by: Animal Hamaguchi
- Debut: December 9, 1994

Yutaka Yoshie (Japanese: 吉江 豊, Hepburn: Yoshie Yutaka; January 5, 1974 – March 10, 2024) was a Japanese professional wrestler, who worked as a freelancer in Japan, performing most notably for All Japan Pro Wrestling (AJPW), where he was a former World Tag Team Champion. He had previously worked for promotions such as New Japan Pro-Wrestling (NJPW), where he was a former IWGP Tag Team Champion, Pro Wrestling Noah and Pro Wrestling Zero1.

== Professional wrestling career ==
=== New Japan Pro-Wrestling (1994–2006) ===
Yoshie was born in Maebashi, Gunma Prefecture, Japan on January 5, 1974. He had a background in judo before joining New Japan Pro-Wrestling's (NJPW) dojo in February 1994. He made his professional wrestling debut on December 9, 1994, in a match against Satoshi Kojima. In his second match, Yoshie broke his leg and was sidelined until December 1995. After spending years on the undercards of NJPW events, Yoshie wrestled his first major match on January 4, 1998, at Final Power Hall in Tokyo Dome, where he was one of the five men selected to face Riki Choshu in his Riki Road Final Message 5 series, set to end his retirement tour. The following year, Yoshie picked up major victories over wrestlers such as Tatsuhito Takaiwa and El Samurai, before leaving for a learning excursion to Germany in August to compete for Catch Wrestling Association (CWA). While in Europe, Yoshie gained weight, and when he returned to Japan in March 2000, he was a completely different wrestler, basing his new style on sumo wrestling, and was quickly recruited by Yuji Nagata into his stable, Fighting Club G-EGGS. Later that year, Yoshie defeated former IWGP Heavyweight Champions Hiroyoshi Tenzan and Satoshi Kojima in singles matches. However, Yoshie's climb was cut short when Nagata disbanded Fighting Club G-EGGS in June 2001, sending him back down the card. On June 13, 2003, Yoshie won his only title in NJPW, when he teamed with Hiroshi Tanahashi to defeat Hiroyoshi Tenzan and Masahiro Chono for the IWGP Tag Team Championship. They held the title for six months before losing it to Tenzan and Osamu Nishimura. After years of being unable to break through into the main fold of NJPW, Yoshie decided not to re-sign with the promotion in January 2006, and instead became a freelancer.

=== Freelancer (2006–2024) ===
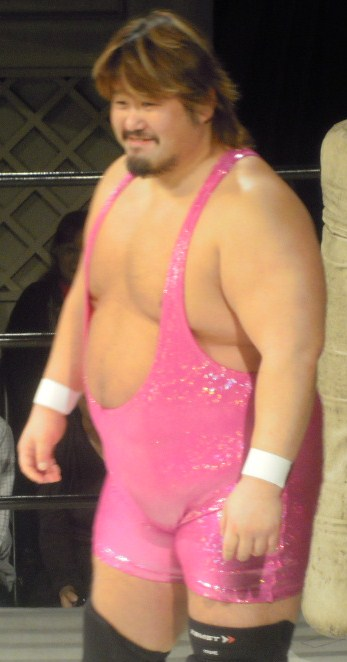
Yoshie in 2011

After leaving NJPW, Yoshie made his debut for Pro Wrestling Zero1, where he, under the ring name Y2P–160 kg, formed a tag team called the P–Force Men with Steve Corino. On February 25, 2006, Yoshie and Corino defeated Skull and Bones (Ikuto Hidaka and Minoru Fujita) to win the NWA Intercontinental Tag Team Championship. They held the title for four months before losing it to Kohei Sato and Ryouji Sai on June 20, 2006. Yoshie spent most of the rest of 2006 working for All Japan Pro Wrestling (AJPW), where in April he participated in his first Champion Carnival. In late 2006, Yoshie also made his debut for Tatsumi Fujinami's and Osamu Nishimura's Muga World Pro Wrestling, for which he wrestled most of 2007. On December 13, 2007, Yoshie defeated Fujinami in the finals of a tournament to win Muga's Dragon Cup. On January 4, 2008, Yoshie returned to NJPW at Wrestle Kingdom II in Tokyo Dome, where he, Masato Tanaka, Tatsuhito Takaiwa and Katsushi Takemura defeated Takashi Iizuka, Koji Kanemoto, Tiger Mask and Ryusuke Taguchi in an eight-man tag team match, when Yoshie pinned Taguchi. Later that year, Yoshie teamed with Manabu Nakanishi to take part in NJPW's G1 Tag League, where the team, named Big Mountain, reached the semifinals before losing to the eventual winners of the tournament, TenKoji (Hiroyoshi Tenzan and Satoshi Kojima). On December 6, 2008, Yoshie and Nakanishi unsuccessfully challenged The Most Violent Players (Togi Makabe and Toru Yano) for the IWGP Tag Team Championship.

On February 6, 2010, Yoshie debuted for Pro Wrestling Noah in a match where he defeated Shuhei Taniguchi. In June, Yoshie made another return to NJPW to compete in the J Sports Crown Openweight 6 Man Tag Tournament, where, under a mask and the ring name Pink Strong Machine, he teamed with Super Strong Machine and Tonga Strong Machine. The team was eliminated in the second round by Prince Devitt, Ryusuke Taguchi and Hirooki Goto. In April 2012, Yoshie entered AJPW's 2012 Champion Carnival, but an ankle fracture on April 23 forced him to pull out of the tournament. Yoshie returned to the ring at an AJPW event on January 20, 2013, when he teamed with Kenso to defeat Mazada and Sushi in a tag team match. The following month, Yoshie formed the Momokuro-gun tag team with Black Tiger V. On February 24, Yoshie returned to Pro Wrestling Noah, defeating Masao Inoue in a singles match. On January 26, 2014, Yoshie formed a super heavyweight tag team with Triple Crown Heavyweight Champion Akebono. The team won AJPW's World Tag Team Championship on March 22, 2015, by defeating Jun Akiyama and Takao Omori. They lost the title to Go Shiozaki and Kento Miyahara on May 6.

On November 23, 2017, Yoshie and Shogun Okamoto won Zero1's 2017 Furinkazan Tag Tournament, defeating Yuko Miyamoto and Yusaku Obata in the finals. On January 1, 2018, Yoshie and Okamoto defeated Hideki Suzuki and Kohei Sato to win the NWA Intercontinental Tag Team Championship.

== Death ==
On March 10, 2024, Yoshie wrestled in a show for All Japan Pro Wrestling at the Gunma Convention Center in Takasaki. He teamed up with Ryo Inoue in a loss to the team of Hokuto Omori and Ryoji Sai. After the match, he went backstage to be interviewed by the press. After the interview, he went back to the locker room, where he suddenly collapsed. He was immediately rushed to a nearby hospital in Takasaki, where he was declared dead at the age of 50. The following day, Suwama and Yoshie's family confirmed that Yoshie's death was due to arteriosclerosis.

== Championships and accomplishments ==
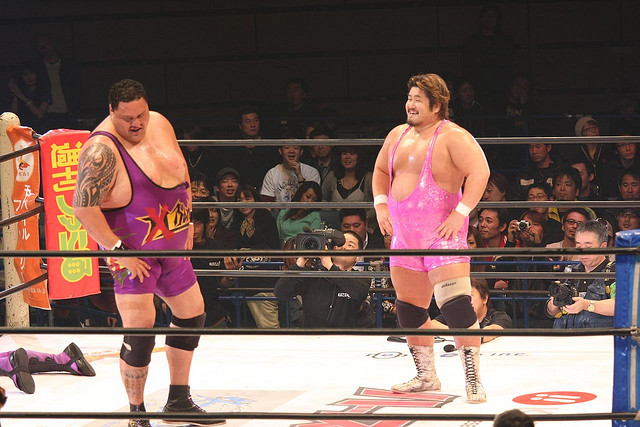
Yoshie (right) with frequent tag team partner Akebono in Hustle

- All Japan Pro Wrestling
  - World Tag Team Championship (1 time) – with Akebono
- Muga World Pro Wrestling
  - Dragon Cup (2007)
  - Tokyo Dome Hotel Cup (2007)
- New Japan Pro-Wrestling
  - IWGP Tag Team Championship (1 time) – with Hiroshi Tanahashi
  - Triathlon Survivor League (2002) – with Manabu Nakanishi and Osamu Nishimura
  - New Wave Award (2000)
- Pro Wrestling Zero1
  - NWA Intercontinental Tag Team Championship (2 times) – with Steve Corino (1) and Masayuki Okamoto/Shogun Okamoto (1)
  - Furinkazan Tag Tournament (2017) – with Shogun Okamoto
- Toryumon
  - Yamaha Cup (2008) – with Último Dragón
