= The Big Guns (professional wrestling) =

Professional wrestling tag team

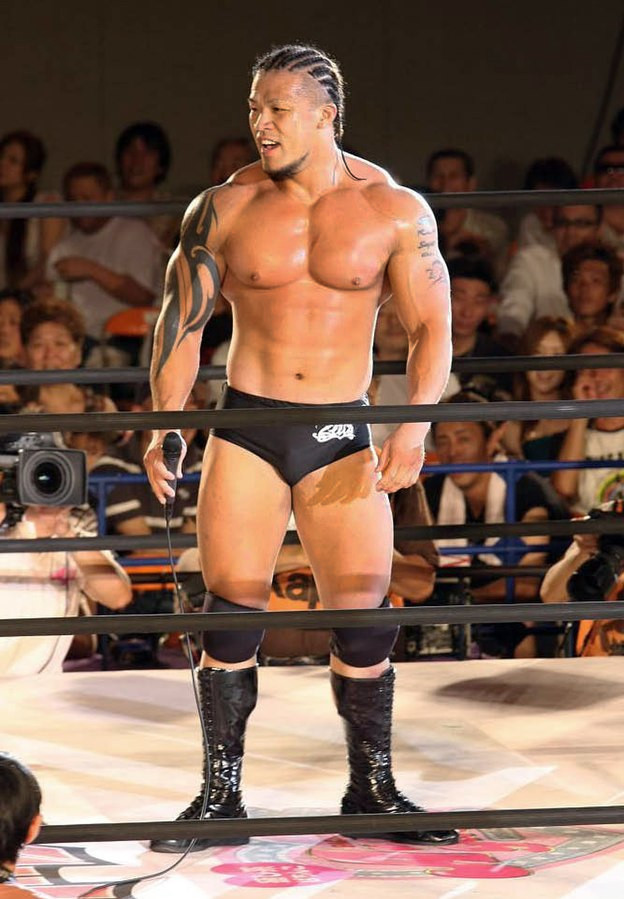
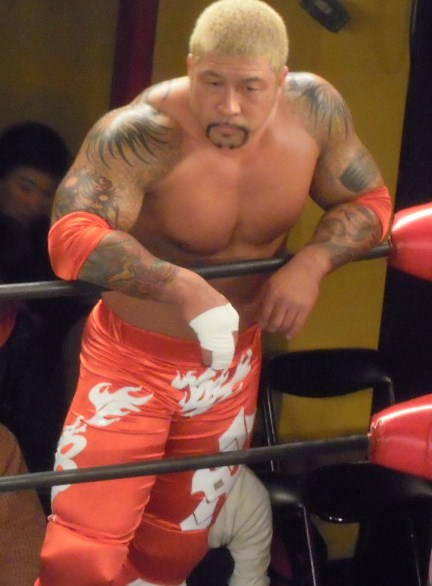
- Zeus (left) and Bodyguard (right)

Tag team
- Members: Zeus; The Bodyguard
- Billed heights: 1.81 m (5 ft 11 1/2 in)- Zeus; 1.75 m (5 ft 9 in)- Bodyguard
- Combined billed weight: 208 kg (459 lb)
- Billed from: Osaka, Japan
- Debut: January 29, 2011

The Big Guns (ザ・ビッグガンズ, Za Biggu Ganzu) is a professional wrestling tag team currently working for All Japan Pro Wrestling, where they are former three-time World Tag Team Champions. They have also worked for Osaka Pro Wrestling, Smash, DDT, Wrestling New Classic, and Pro Wrestling Zero1.

== History ==
=== Osaka Pro Wrestling (2011–2013) ===
The Big Guns was formed after professional wrestler Zeus defeated Bodyguard in a singles encounter in January 2011. After the match, JOKER rushed to the ring to attack Zeus. When Bodyguard refused to join in, he was attacked as well. Zeus and Bodyguard then joined forces against JOKER. Weeks later, they won the Osaka Pro Wrestling Tag Team Championship from JOKER's Kuuga & Orochi. They then successfully defended the title against Hideyoshi & Masamune at the February IMP Hall show. Their reign was short-lived as Orochi reunited with Tadasuke and took the belts back in March 2011. The Big Guns have also wrestled against Genichiro Tenryu, Minoru Suzuki, Akebono, and Shinjiro Otani.

They won the Osaka Tag Festival in 2013 and later won the Osaka Pro Wrestling Tag Team Championship for the second time. Zeus also won the Osaka Pro Wrestling Championship, and at the Tennozan 2013 Zeus defeated Bodyguard in the finals to win the tournament. After it was announced that Osaka Pro Wrestling would continue under new management, Zeus and The Bodyguard vacated the Osaka Pro Wrestling Championship and Tag Team Championship to leave the promotion. On April 20 Zeus and Bodyguard were defeated in their last match with Quiet Storm against Billyken Kid, Bull Armor Takuya and Black Buffalo.

=== All Japan Pro Wrestling (2014–2022) ===
On March 28 Zeus and The Bodyguard made their debut in All Japan Pro Wrestling (AJPW) by defeating Menso re-Oyaji and Sushi. On May 16 Zeus and The Bodyguard had an opportunity for the World Tag Team Championship but they lost to the defending champions Evolution (Joe Doering and Suwama. They also participated in the 2014 Ōdō Tournament but Zeus was eliminated at the second round by the eventual winner of the tournament Go Shiozaki and Bodyguard lost at the first round against Takao Omori. In addition, Zeus and The Bodyguard participated at the 2014 World's Strongest Tag Determination League but failed to win the World Tag Team Championship.

On January 12, 2015, Zeus defeated Kenso to become the number 1 contender for the Triple Crown Heavyweight Championship. On February 7 Zeus failed to capture the Triple Crown Heavyweight tile from Go Shiozaki. Both Zeus and The Bodyguard participated at 2015 Champion Carnival. On May 31 they had another shot at the World Tag Team Championship but they lost against Xceed (Go Shiozaki and Kento Miyahara).

The Big Guns participated at the 2015 World's Strongest Tag Determination League and were defeated by Kento Miyahara and Suwama at the finals of the tournament. On December 23 they won the World Tag Team Champions by defeating Wild Burning (Jun Akiyama and Takao Omori). On February 12 at the first day of the Jr. Battle Of Glory Zeus lost to Kento Miyahara for the vacated Triple Crown Heavyweight Championship. Between April 9 to April 24, Zeus and Bodyguard participated at 2016 Champion Carnival, and at the finals Zeus lost to Daisuke Sekimoto. On June 15 Zeus and Bodyguard lost the World Tag Team titles to Daisuke Sekimoto and Yuji Okabayashi. They won the title back in November 27.

The Big Guns returned to Osaka Pro for one night only on May 1, 2019, for the promotion's 20th anniversary and teamed with Mondai Ryu to defeat Hide Kubota, Kushikatsu Oyaji and TAMURA in a six-man match. The team remained inactive during the pandemic. In 2023, after teaming on and off in All Japan, they reappeared in Osaka Pro.

== Championships and accomplishments ==
- All Japan Pro Wrestling
  - Triple Crown Heavyweight Championship (1 time) - Zeus
  - World Tag Team Championship (4 times)
- Pro Wrestling Land's End
  - PWF All Asia Heavyweight Championship (1 time) - Bodyguard
- Osaka Pro Wrestling
  - Osaka Pro Wrestling Tag Team Championship (2 times) - Zeus and Bodyguard
  - Osaka Pro Wrestling Championship (1 times) - Zeus
  - Tenno-zan (2013) - Zeus
  - Osaka Tag Festival (2013) - Zeus and Bodyguard
