= Furinkazan (professional wrestling) =

Japanese professional wrestling tag tournament

The Furinkazan (風林火山, Fūrinkazan; lit. "Wind, Forest, Fire, Mountain") is a professional wrestling tag team tournament held by Pro Wrestling Zero1. It was created in 2009.

It was preceded by the Passion Cup Tag Tournament in 2008, which was won by Kohei Sato and Ryouji Sai.

The Furinkazan was originally held in a round-robin format, with two points for a win, one for a draw and none for a loss. The teams finishing atop the two blocks advanced to the finals to determine the winner. However, since 2012 the tournament has been held in a single-elimination format under the name Furinkazan Tag Tournament (風林火山タッグトーナメント, Fūrinkazan Taggu Tōnamento).

== Results ==
=== List of winners ===
Year	Winners (total won as an individual)	Total won as a team
2009	Shinjiro Otani and Akebono	1
2010	Kohei Sato and Kamikaze	1
2011	Masato Tanaka and Fujita "Jr." Hayato	1
2012	James Raideen and Zeus	1
2013	Daemon Ueda and Yusaku Obata	1
2014	Masato Tanaka (2) and Takashi Sugiura	1
2016	Yusaku Obata (2) and Kai	1
2017	Shogun Okamoto and Yutaka Yoshie	1
2018	Kohei Sato (2) and Sugi	1
2019	Yuji Hino and Yuji Okabayashi	1
2020	Shinjiro Otani (2) and Yumehito Imanari	1
2021	Tomohiko Hashimoto and Gajo	1
2022	Yasu Kubota and Hide Kubota	1
2023	Masato Tanaka (3) and Yoshikazu Yokoyama	1
2025	Junya Matsunaga and Tsugutaka Sato	1

=== 2009 ===
The 2009 Furinkazan featured two blocks of five and ran from December 9 through December 19. Winner, Akebono & Shinjiro Otani, went on to challenge and defeat Munenori Sawa & Ikuto Hidaka for NWA Intercontinental Tag Team titles.

Final standings
Block A		Block B	
Akebono & Shinjiro Otani	6	Masato Tanaka & Masaaki Mochizuki	6
Ikuto Hidaka & Munenori Sawa	5	Kohei Sato & Kamikaze	5
"Mr. X" Minoru Fujita & "Mr. XX" Takuya Sugawara	4	Shiro Koshinaka & Hajime Ohara	5
Steve Corino & Kintaro Kanemura	3	Rikiya Fudo & Shito Ueda	2
Ryouji Sai & Kenta Kakinuma	2	Tsutomu Oosugi & Hercules Senga	2

Block A	Akebono Otani	Corino Kanemura	Fujita Sugawara	Hidaka Sawa	Sai Kakinuma	Block B	Fudo Ueda	Koshinaka Ohara	Oosugi Senga	Sato Kamikaze	Tanaka Mochizuki
Akebono Otani	X	Akebono; Otani (13:31)	Akebono; Otani (14:59)	Hidaka; Sawa (18:26)	Akebono; Otani (16:45)	Fudo Ueda	X	Koshinaka; Ohara (16:29)	Fudo; Ueda (11:38)	Sato; KAMIKAZE (17:29)	Tanaka; Mochizuki (12:51)
Corino Kanemura	Akebono; Otani (13:31)	X	Corino; Kanemura (13:51)	Draw (17:52)	Sai; Kakinuma (19:31)	Koshinaka Ohara	Koshinaka; Ohara (16:29)	X	Oosugi; Senga (11:58)	Draw (30:00)	Koshinaki; Ohara (14:44)
Fujita Sugawara	Akebono; Otani (14:59)	Corino; Kanemura (13:51)	X	Fujita; Sugawara (13:18)	Fujita; Sugawara (14:43)	Oosugi Senga	Fudo; Ueda (11:38)	Oosugi; Senga (11:58)	X	Sato; KAMIKAZE (13:48)	Tanaka; Mochizuki (13:26)
Hidaka Sawa	Hidaka; Sawa (18:26)	Draw (17:52)	Fujita; Sugawara (14:26)	X	Hidaka; Sawa (15:07)	Sato Kamikaze	Sato; KAMIKAZE (17:29)	Draw (30:00)	Sato; KAMIKAZE (13:48)	X	Tanaka; Mochizuki (12:44)
Sai Kakinuma	Akebono; Otani (16:45)	Sai; Kakinuma (19:31)	Fujita; Sugawara (14:43)	Hidaka; Sawa (15:07)	X	Tanaka Mochizuki	Tanaka; Mochizuki (12:51)	Koshinaki; Ohara (14:44)	Tanaka; Mochizuki (13:26)	Tanaka; Mochizuki (12:44)	X

Final
A1	Akebono & Otani	Pin
B1	Tanaka & Mochizuki	17:34

=== 2010 ===
The 2010 Furinkazan featured two blocks of five and ran from December 11 through December 21. The tournament was contested for the vacant NWA Intercontinental Tag Team Championship.

Final standings
Block A		Block B	
Kamikaze & Kohei Sato	8	Daisuke Sekimoto & Masato Tanaka	7
Akebono & Shinjiro Otani	6	Funaki & Yutaka Yoshie	6
Phil Davis & Sean Davis	2	Fujita Hayato & Ikuto Hidaka	5
Hikaru Sato and Munenori Sawa	2	Ryouji Sai & Shinsuke Watataka	2
Kintaro Kanemura and Takuya Sugawara	2	Dan Gorham aka Danny Miles & Yuzuru Saito	0

Block A	Akebono Otani	P.Davis S.Davis	Kamikaze K.Sato	Kanemura Sugawara	Sawa H.Sato	Block B	Hayato Hidaka	Funaki Yoshie	Gorham Saito	Sai Wakataka	Sekimoto Tanaka
Akebono Otani	X	Akebono; Otani (14:47)	Kamikaze; K.Sato (16:00)	Akebono; Otani (16:10)	Akebono; Otani (18:32)	Hayato Hidaka	X	Funaki; Yoshie (16:29)	Hayato; Hidaka (16:20)	Hayato; Hidaka (17:10)	Draw (30:00)
P.Davis S.Davis	Akebono; Otani (14:47)	X	Kamikaze; K. Sato (15:49)	Kanemura; Sugawara (9:58)	P.Davis; S.Davis (12:11)	Funaki Yoshie	Funaki; Yoshie (16:29)	X	Funaki; Yoshie (13:11)	Funaki; Yoshie (13:59)	Sekimoto; Tanaka (9:42)
Kamikaze K.Sato	Kamikaze; K.Sato (16:00)	Kamikaze; K. Sato (15:49)	X	Kamikaze; K. Sato (15:42)	Kamikaze; K.Sato (20:59)	Gorham Saito	Hayato; Hidaka (16:20)	Funaki; Yoshie (13:11)	X	Sai; Wakataka (9:41)	Sekimoto; Tanaka (15:28)
Kanemura Sugawara	Akebono; Otani (16:10)	Kanemura; Sugawara (9:58)	Kamikaze; K. Sato (15:42)	X	Sawa; H.Sato (14:12)	Sai Wakataka	Hayato; Hidaka (17:10)	Funaki; Yoshie (13:59)	Sai; Wakataka (9:41)	X	Sekimoto; Tanaka (14:35)
Sawa H.Sato	Akebono; Otani (18:32)	P.Davis; S.Davis (12:11)	Kamikaze; K.Sato (20:59)	Sawa; H.Sato (14:12)	X	Sekimoto Tanaka	Draw (30:00)	Sekimoto; Tanaka (9:42)	Sekimoto; Tanaka (15:28)	Sekimoto; Tanaka (14:35)	X

Final
A1	Kamikaze & K.Sato	Pin
B1	Sekimoto & Tanaka	18:52

=== 2011 ===
The 2011 Furinkazan featured two blocks of five and ran from December 8 through December 18.

Final standings
Block A		Block B	
Shinjiro Otani & Yoshikazu Yokoyama	6	Fujita Hayato & Masato Tanaka	7
Raideen & Ryouji Sai	5	Kamikaze & Kohei Sato	5
Ikuto Hidaka & Takafumi Ito	4	Akebono & Daichi Hashimoto	4
Takuya Sugawara & Tsuyoshi Kikuchi	3	Schwarz & Weiss	2
Brother & Buffa	2	Mineo Fujita and Shito Ueda	2

Block A	Brother Buffa	Hidaka Ito	Raideen Sai	Otani Yokoyama	Sugawara Kikuchi	Block B	Akebono Hashimoto	Hayato Tanaka	Kamikaze Sato	Fujita Ueda	Schwarz Weiss
Brother Buffa	X	Hidaka; Ito (13:41)	Raideen; Sai (13:38)	Otani; Yokoyama (12:13)	Brother; Buffa (8:16)	Akebono Hashimoto	X	Hayato; Tanaka (8:03)	Akebono; Hashimoto (18:41)	Fujita; Ueda (11:12)	Akebono; Hashimoto (15:15)
Hidaka Ito	Hidaka; Ito (13:41)	X	Raideen; Sai (15:42)	Hidaka; Ito (26:10)	Sugawara; Kikuchi (16:49)	Hayato Tanaka	Hayato; Tanaka (8:03)	X	Draw (30:00)	Hayato; Tanaka (14:25)	Hayato; Tanaka (16:48)
Raideen Sai	Raideen; Sai (13:38)	Raideen; Sai (15:42)	X	Otani; Yokoyama (16:29)	Draw (30:00)	Kamikaze Sato	Akebono; Hashimoto (18:41)	Draw (30:00)	X	Kamikaze; Sato (17:10)	Kamikaze; Sato (13:21)
Otani Yokoyama	Otani; Yokoyama (12:13)	Hidaka; Ito (26:10)	Otani; Yokoyama (16:29)	X	Otani; Yokoyama (16:18)	Fujita Ueda	Fujita; Ueda (11:12)	Hayato; Tanaka (14:25)	Kamikaze; Sato (17:10)	X	Schwarz; Weiss (13:30)
Sugawara Kikuchi	Brother; Buffa (8:16)	Sugawara; Kikuchi (16:49)	Draw (30:00)	Otani; Yokoyama (16:18)	X	Schwarz Weiss	Akebono; Hashimoto (15:15)	Hayato; Tanaka (16:48)	Kamikaze; Sato (13:21)	Schwarz; Weiss (13:30)	X

Final
A1	Otani & Yokoyama	Pin
B1	Hayato & Tanaka	23:21

=== 2012 ===
The 2012 Furinkazan was held from December 13 to December 15. For the first time, the tournament was held in a single-elimination format.

First round December 13
Atsushi Onita & Masato Tanaka	Pin
Akebono & Takuya Sugawara	10:01
Shinjiro Otani & Tatsuhito Takaiwa	Pin
Daichi Hashimoto & Hiro Saito	15:54
Shito Ueda & Yusaku Obata	Pin
Hayato Mashita & Yoshikazu Yokoyama	08:29
Mineo Fujita & Rion Mizuki	Pin
Ikuto Hidaka & Yo-Hey	11:54

Second round December 14
James Raideen & Zeus	Pin
Ryouji Sai & Will Gibson	16:39
Atsushi Onita & Masato Tanaka	Pin
Shinjiro Otani & Tatsuhito Takaiwa	12:49
Kamikaze & Onryo	Pin
Kohei Sato & Tomohiko Hashimoto	17:42
Shito Ueda & Yusaku Obata	Pin
Mineo Fujita & Rion Mizuki	13:29

Semifinals; December 15
James Raideen & Zeus	Pin
Shinjiro Otani & Tatsuhito Takaiwa	16:59
KAMIKAZE & Onryo	Pin
Shito Ueda & Yusaku Obata	13:48

Finals; December 15
James Raideen & Zeus	Pin
Shito Ueda & Yusaku Obata	19:59

=== 2013 ===
The 2013 Furinkazan was held from December 1 through December 17.

First round (December 1, 10)
James Raideen & Tama Williams	Pin
Kazma Sakamoto & Ryouji Sai	15:21
Fujita Hayato & Ikuto Hidaka	Pin
Takuya Sugawara & Touru Owashi	15:21
Masato Tanaka & Shinjiro Otani	Pin
Kengo & "brother" YASSHI	17:11
Daichi Hashimoto & Mineo Fujita	Pin
Choun Shiryu & Jason Lee	13:04
Kamikaze & Kohei Sato	Pin
Tank Nagai & Yoshikazu Yokoyama	15:49
Daemon Ueda & Yusaku Obata	Pin
Masato Shibata & Yutaka Yoshie	14:31

Second round (December 10)
James Raideen & Tama Williams	Bye
Fujita Hayato & Ikuto Hidaka	Pin
Billyken Kid & Tigers Mask	14:47
Masato Tanaka & Shinjiro Otani	Pin
Atsushi Onita & Kenichi Fujii	10:40
Daisuke Sekimoto & Yuji Okabayashi	Pin
Chon Shiryu & Jason Lee	16:24
KAMIKAZE & Kohei Sato	Bye
Daemon Ueda & Yusaku Obata	Pin
Maybach β & The Great Malaki	10:26

Third round (December 11)
James Raideen & Tama Williams	Pin
Fujita Hayato & Ikuto Hidaka	12:13
Masato Tanaka & Shinjiro Otani	Bye
Daisuke Sekimoto & Yuji Okabayashi	Pin
KAMIKAZE & Kohei Sato	18:02
Bye
Daemon Ueda & Yusaku Obata

Semi-finals (December 17)
James Raideen & Tama Williams	Pin
Masato Tanaka & Shinjiro Otani	15:54
Daisuke Sekimoto & Yuji Okabayashi	Pin
Daemon Ueda & Yusaku Obata	16:00

Final (December 17)
James Raideen & Tama Williams	Pin
Daemon Ueda & Yusaku Obata	15:34

=== 2014 ===
The 2014 Furinkazan was held from December 14 to December 24.

First round December 14,15
Daemon Ueda & Kamikaze	Pin
Atsushi Onita & Masashi Aoyagi	13:11
Shinjiro Otani & Yoshikazu Yokoyama	Pin
TARU	18:54

Second round December 19
Daemon Ueda & Kamikaze	16:48
Masato Tanaka & Takashi Sugiura	Pin
Hideki Suzuki & Kohei Sato	Pin
Kankuro Hoshino & Masato Inaba	14:48
Akebono & Yusaku Obata	Pin
Fujita Hayato & Ikuto Hidaka	13:20
Shinjiro Otani & Yoshikazu Yokoyama	Bye

Semifinals; December 24
Masato Tanaka & Takashi Sugiura	Pin
Hideki Suzuki & Kohei Sato	4:59
Akebono & Yusaku Obata	9:11
Shinjiro Otani & Yoshikazu Yokoyama	Pin

Finals; December 24
Masato Tanaka & Takashi Sugiura	Pin
Shinjiro Otani & Yoshikazu Yokoyama	22:12

=== 2016 ===
The 2016 Furinkazan was held from December 10 to December 18.

First round December 10,12,13
Akebono and Shogun Okamoto	Pin
Masato Tanaka and James Raideen	13:03
Isami Kodaka and Takumi Tsukamoto	Pin
Takuya Sugawara and Kotaro Suzuki	12:04
Minoru Tanaka and Koji Kanemoto	Pin
Shinjiro Otani and Kazuki Hashimoto	21:00
Kai and Yusaku Obata	Pin
Kohei Sato and Kamikaze	24:53

Semifinal; December 13,14,16
Akebono and Shogun Okamoto	Pin
Isami Kodaka and Takumi Tsukamoto	13:31
Minoru Tanaka and Koji Kanemoto	Pin
Kai and Yusaku Obata	18:44

Final; December 18
Akebono and Shogun Okamoto	Pin
Kai and Yusaku Obata	16:39

=== 2017 ===
The 2017 Furinkazan was held from November 3 to November 23.

First round November 3
Ikuto Hidaka & Takuya Sugawara	Pin
Sean Guinness & Sugi	10:51
Shogun Okamoto & Yutaka Yoshie	Pin
Shinjiro Ohtani & Super Tiger	13:34

Second round November 5, 13, 17
Ikuto Hidaka & Takuya Sugawara	Pin
Daiki Inaba & Tsugutaka Sato	15:20
Yusaku Obata & Yuko Miyamoto	Pin
Masato Tanaka & Isami Kodaka	19:36
Kohei Sato & Hideki Suzuki	Sub
Tatsuhito Takaiwa & Yoshikazu Yokoyama	16:43
Shogun Okamoto & Yutaka Yoshie	Pin
Taru & Hartley Jackson	13:41

Semifinals; November 23
Ikuto Hidaka & Takuya Sugawara	Pin
Yusaku Obata & Yuko Miyamoto	9:45
Kohei Sato & Hideki Suzuki	Pin
Shogun Okamoto & Yutaka Yoshie	10:53

Finals; November 23
Yusaku Obata & Yuko Miyamoto	Pin
Shogun Okamoto & Yutaka Yoshie	17:08

=== 2018 ===
The 2018 Furinkazan was held from December 9 to December 22.

First round December 9,16
Shogun Okamoto and Chris Vice	Pin
Hide Kubota and Yasu Kubota	12:50
Shinjiro Otani and Tatsuhito Takaiwa	Pin
Yoshiaki Fujiwara and Shoki Kitamura	16:10
Yuji Hino and Takuya Sugawara	Pin
Masato Tanaka and Nanae Takahashi	15:50
Kohei Sato and Sugi	Pin
Ikuto Hidaka and Fuminori Abe	18:32

Semifinal; December 22
Shogun Okamoto and Chris Vice	Pin
Yuji Hino and Takuya Sugawara	9:55
Shinjiro Otani and Tatsuhito Takaiwa	Pin
Kohei Sato and Sugi	11:19

Final; December 22
Shogun Okamoto and Chris Vice	Pin
Kohei Sato and Sugi	14:05

=== 2019 ===
The 2019 Furinkazan was held from October 30 to November 17.

First round October 30
Kohei Sato and Towa Iwasaki	Pin
Hide Kubota and Yasu Kubota	12:28
Masato Tanaka and Tetsuhiro Kuroda	Pin
Shinjiro Otani and Shiro Koshinaka	15:17
Shuji Kondo and Takuya Sugawara	Pin
Kenichiro Arai and Sugi	10:37
Yuji Hino and Yuji Okabayashi	Pin
Shogun Okamoto and Chris Vice	12:30

Semifinal; November 17
Kohei Sato and Towa Iwasaki	Pin
Masato Tanaka and Tetsuhiro Kuroda	11:17
Shuji Kondo and Takuya Sugawara	Pin
Yuji Hino and Yuji Okabayashi	8:51

Final; November 17
Kohei Sato and Towa Iwasaki	Pin
Yuji Hino and Yuji Okabayashi	18:41

=== 2020 ===
The 2020 Furinkazan was held from December 6 to December 25.

First round December 6, 19, 20
December 20, Kawasaki, Japan
Shinjiro Otani and Yumehito Imanari	Sub
Revengers (Takuya Sugawara and Masato Tanaka)	14:18
December 6, Kawasaki, Japan
Voodoo Murders (Yoshikazu Yokoyama and Chris Vice)	Pin
Satsuki Nagao and Hartley Jackson	15:48
December 19, Chiba, Japan
New Spirits (Towa Iwasaki and Tsugutaka Sato)	18:19
The Kubota Brothers (Yasu Kubota and Hide Kubota)	Sub
December 20, Kawasaki, Japan
Sugi and Raicho	14:28
#StrongHearts (T-Hawk and El Lindaman)	Pin

Semifinals; December 25
December 25, Tokyo, Japan
Shinjiro Otani and Yumehito Imanari	Pin
Voodoo Murders	13:10
December 25, Tokyo, Japan
The Kubota Brothers	Sub
#StrongHearts	6:19

Final; December 25
December 25, Tokyo, Japan
Shinjiro Otani and Yumehito Imanari	Sub
The Kubota Brothers	17:00

=== 2021 ===
The 2021 Furinkazan will run from October 1 to November 12.

First round October 1
October 1, Tokyo, Japan
Yumehito Imanari and Yuna Manase	16:11
Hartley Jackson and Junya Matsunaga	Pin
October 1, Tokyo, Japan
Masato Tanaka and Yasu Kubota	Pin
Takuya Sugawara and Hide Kubota	13:02
October 1, Tokyo, Japan
Tsugutaka Sato and Koji Doi	14:41
Shoki Kitamura and Takafumi	Pin
October 1, Tokyo, Japan
Tomohiko Hashimoto and Gajo	Pin
Voodoo Murders (Chris Vice and Yoshikazu Yokoyama)	10:47

Semifinals; November 12
November 12, Tokyo, Japan
Hartley Jackson and Junya Matsunaga	8:49
Masato Tanaka and Yasu Kubota
November 12, Tokyo, Japan
Shoki Kitamura and Takafumi	7:45
Tomohiko Hashimoto and Gajo

Final; November 12
November 12, Tokyo, Japan
Hartley Jackson and Junya Matsunaga	13:59
Tomohiko Hashimoto and Gajo

=== 2022 ===
The 2022 Furinkazan was held from November 11 to December 16.

- First rounds (November 11)
  - Junya Matsunaga and Takafumi defeated Noriyuki Yoshida and Tsugutaka Sato (18:03)
  - Aja Kong and Satsuki Nagao defeated Voodoo Murders (Chris Vice and Yoshikazu Yokoyama) (10:52)
  - Masato Tanaka and Ryo Hoshino defeated Fuminori Abe and Takuya Sugawara (13:24)
  - Kubota Brothers (Hide Kubota and Yasu Kubota) defeated Leo Isaka and Shoki Kitamura (13:39)
- Second rounds (November 20)
  - Takumi Sakurai and Tomohiko Hashimoto defeated Aja Kong and Satsuki Nagao (16:24)
- Semifinals (November 26 and December 11)
  - Masato Tanaka and Ryo Hoshino defeated Takumi Sakurai and Tomohiko Hashimoto (11:46)
  - Kubota Brothers (Hide Kubota and Yasu Kubota) defeated Junya Matsunaga and Takafumi (13:59)
- Final (December 16)
  - Kubota Brothers (Hide Kubota and Yasu Kubota) defeated Masato Tanaka and Ryo Hoshino (15:45)

=== 2023 ===
The 2023 Furinkazan was held from November 3 to November 25.

Round of 16
Rikiya Fudo and Tsugutaka Sato	Pin
Takumi Baba and Takumi Saito	13:58
Leo Isaka and Shoki Kitamura	Pin
Real Zero1 (Chris Vice and Takuya Sugawara)	13:58
Ryo Hoshino and Shingo	Pin
Kamikaze and Satsuki Nagao	16:11
Real Zero1 (Masato Tanaka and Yoshikazu Yokoyama)	Pin
Ryota Hama and Yuki Toki	13:30

Quarterfinals
Rikiya Fudo and Tsugutaka Sato	Pin
Kubota Brothers (Hide Kubota and Yasu Kubota)	16:55
Ryo Hoshino and Shingo	Pin
Astro Black and Astro Black	14:17

Semifinals
Rikiya Fudo and Tsugutaka Sato	10:53
Leo Isaka and Shoki Kitamura	Pin
Ryo Hoshino and Shingo	9:25
Real Zero1 (Masato Tanaka and Yoshikazu Yokoyama)	Pin

Finals
Leo Isaka and Shoki Kitamura	19:26
Real Zero1 (Masato Tanaka and Yoshikazu Yokoyama)	Pin

=== 2025 ===
The 2025 Furinkazan was held from December 5 to December 27. It was contested for the vacant Intercontinental Tag Team Championship.

First round
JJ Gale and Bryan Ishizaka	11:35
Chris Vice and Violento Jack	Pin
Yuko Miyamoto and Fuminori Abe	11:57
Junya Matsunaga and Tsugutaka Sato	Pin

Quarterfinals
Daichi Hashimoto and Yuya Aoki	Pin
Chris Vice and Violento Jack	14:04
Jinsei Shinzaki and Hayabusa	Pin
Masato Tanaka and Van Vert Jack	16:24
Naka Shuma and Kyu Mogami	14:59
Junya Matsunaga and Tsugutaka Sato	Countout
Takuya Sugawara and Veny	11:52
Mammoth Sasaki and Yuki Toki	Pin

Semifinals
Daichi Hashimoto and Yuya Aoki	17:06
Jinsei Shinzaki and Hayabusa	Pin
Junya Matsunaga and Tsugutaka Sato	Pin
Mammoth Sasaki and Yuki Toki	19:45

Finals
Jinsei Shinzaki and Hayabusa	20:24
Junya Matsunaga and Tsugutaka Sato	Pin

== See also ==
- World's Strongest Tag Determination League
- G1 Tag League
- Professional wrestling in Japan
- Global Tag League
- Saikyo Tag League
