= The Bodyguard (wrestler) =

Japanese bodybuilder and professional wrestler

Bodyguard
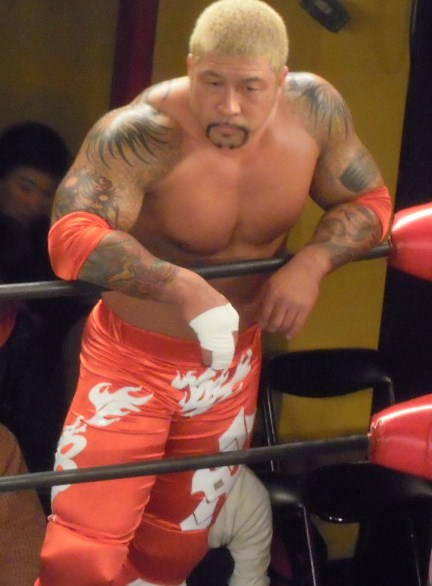

Personal information
- Born: Noboru Kurakawa (倉川 昇, Kurakawa Noboru); June 30, 1968 (age 58) Osaka, Japan

Professional wrestling career
- Ring name(s): (The) Bodyguard; Kurofuku; Macho Samurai
- Billed height: 175 cm (5 ft 9 in)
- Billed weight: 100 kg (220 lb)
- Trained by: Osaka Pro Wrestling
- Debut: January 24, 2009

Noboru Kurakawa (倉川 昇, Kurakawa Noboru; born June 30, 1968) is a Japanese bodybuilder and professional wrestler better known by his ring name The Bodyguard (ザ・ボディガー, Za Bodigā). He is currently a freelancer, working most notably for All Japan Pro Wrestling (AJPW), where he is a four-time World Tag Team Champion with longtime partner Zeus as "The Big Guns". Kurakawa is also a former two-time Osaka Pro Wrestling Tag Team Champion with Zeus, and a former IWF Heavyweight Champion.

== Professional wrestling career ==
=== Osaka Pro Wrestling (2009–2014) ===
The Bodyguard made his first appearance in Osaka Pro Wrestling in the fall of 2008, assisting Tigers Mask in completing his heel turn. Originally called Kurofuku, his strength was evident from the start and immediately started to cause trouble by helping Tigers win matches. Soon, he began a long-running feud started with Zeus, which eventually led to him being outed as former professional bodybuilder Noboru Kurakawa, the winner of two Musclemania Japan competitions in 2002 and 2007. To build heat for their feud, Kurakawa (now known as The Bodyguard) and Zeus engaged in some power battles, including an arm-wrestling contest that had no clear winner. Bodyguard would make his official in-ring debut as The Bodyguard at Hurricane 2009 in a loss to Zeus.

In August 2010, Bodyguard turned on Tigers Mask, aligning himself with Asian Cougar and Orochi to form Joker. In January 2011, Bodyguard was kicked out of Joker by Kuuga after they attempted to illegally help in a match against Zeus, only for Bodyguard to refuse, wanting to win the match fairly. After the match, Bodyguard was attacked and beaten down by Joker, but was saved by Zeus, who cleared everyone out of the ring and shook hands with Bodyguard after the match, signalling a mutual respect between the two and ending their long-running rivalry. Soon after, they formed a tag team. Known as the Big Guns, they won the Osaka Pro Tag Titles in February 2011, but lost them to Joker in March. Various injuries kept him sidelined for a good portion of 2011, but he was able to return to active competition in the fall. A knee injury once again sidelined him in early 2012, but he returned for a Big Guns produced show in May. Shortly after that, he announced that other than for Big Guns-related matches, his new ring name would be "Macho Samurai". At Hurricane 2012, Bodyguard aggravated his knee injury during a three way Tag Title match, and shortly after announced that he needed surgery. The surgery and recovery kept him out for 8 months.

He returned to the ring in March 2013, announcing that he would become a full-time Osaka Pro roster member. The Big Guns began to achieve more success shortly after, winning the Osaka Tag Festival in June and the Osaka Pro Wrestling Tag Team Championship for the second time in October. At the same time, Zeus also won the Osaka Pro Wrestling Championship and the 2013 Tennozan Tournament. Zeus and Bodyguard faced each other in the finals, with Zeus coming out on top. On March 1, 2014, it was announced that Osaka Pro would be folding due to financial difficulties and on April 20, all of its workers would become freelancers. Zeus and Bodyguard eventually vacated all of their championships, and on April 20 wrestled their last match in OPW to date, teaming with Quiet Storm in a loss to Billyken Kid, Bull Armor Takuya and Black Buffalo.

=== All Japan Pro Wrestling (2014–present) ===
On March 28, 2014, Zeus and The Bodyguard made their debuts for AJPW, defeating Menso re-Oyaji and Sushi. On May 16, they received an opportunity at the World Tag Team Championship, but were unable to defeat defending champions Evolution (Joe Doering and Suwama). Zeus and Bodyguard both participated in the 2014 Ōdō Tournament as singles competitors, with Zeus being eliminated in the second round by eventual winner Go Shiozaki and Bodyguard in the first round by Takao Omori. The Big Guns also participated in the 2014 World's Strongest Tag Determination League, finishing with 8 points but not making it to the final.

Both Zeus and The Bodyguard participated in the 2015 Champion Carnival Tournament, with Zeus finishing the tournament with 3 points in Block B and Bodyguard finishing with 2 points in Block A. On May 31, they received another shot at the World Tag Team Championship, but were unable to defeat Xceed (Go Shiozaki and Kento Miyahara). On August 15, Zeus and Bodyguard scored a big win, defeating former World Tag Team Champions Akebono and Yutaka Yoshie. They once again participated in the World's Strongest Tag Determination League in 2015, losing their first two matches but managing to win the rest of their matches, and make it into the finals, finishing the tournament with 8 points. In the final, they were defeated by Kento Miyahara and Suwama. On December 23, Zeus and Bodyguard finally captured the World Tag Team Championship, defeating Wild Burning (Jun Akiyama and Takao Omori).

On February 21, Zeus and Bodyguard made their first successful defence of the World Tag Team Championship, defeating Nextream (Jake Lee and Kento Miyahara). On June 15, Zeus and Bodyguard lost the World Tag Team title to Daisuke Sekimoto and Yuji Okabayashi. On November 27, they defeated Sekimoto and Okabayashi to regain the championship.

== Acting career ==
The Bodyguard stars in the Emilio Insolera film Sign Gene, the first superhero film about deaf mutants who have superhuman powers through the use of sign language. The film was released on September 14, 2017.

== Personal life ==
Outside of professional wrestling, Kurakawa co-owns "King Gym", a power and strength gym in his hometown of Osaka, Japan, with tag team partner Kensho Obayashi.

== Championships and accomplishments ==
=== Bodybuilding ===
- Musclemania Japan (2002, 2007)

=== Professional wrestling ===
- All Japan Pro Wrestling
  - World Tag Team Championship (4 times) – with Zeus
  - January 2 Korakuen Hall Heavyweight Battle Royal (2021)
- Big Japan Pro Wrestling
  - BJW Tag Team Championship (1 time) – with Daisuke Sekimoto
- Independent Wrestling Federation
  - IWF Heavyweight Championship (1 time)
- Pro Wrestling Land's End
  - All Asia Heavyweight Championship (1 time)
- Osaka Pro Wrestling
  - Osaka Tag Team Championship (2 times) – with Zeus
  - Osaka Tag Festival (2013) – with Zeus
- Pro Wrestling Illustrated
  - Ranked No. 165 of the top 500 singles wrestlers in the PWI 500 in 2018
