= James Raideen =

New Zealander MMA fighter and professional wrestler signed to RIZIN and Land's End

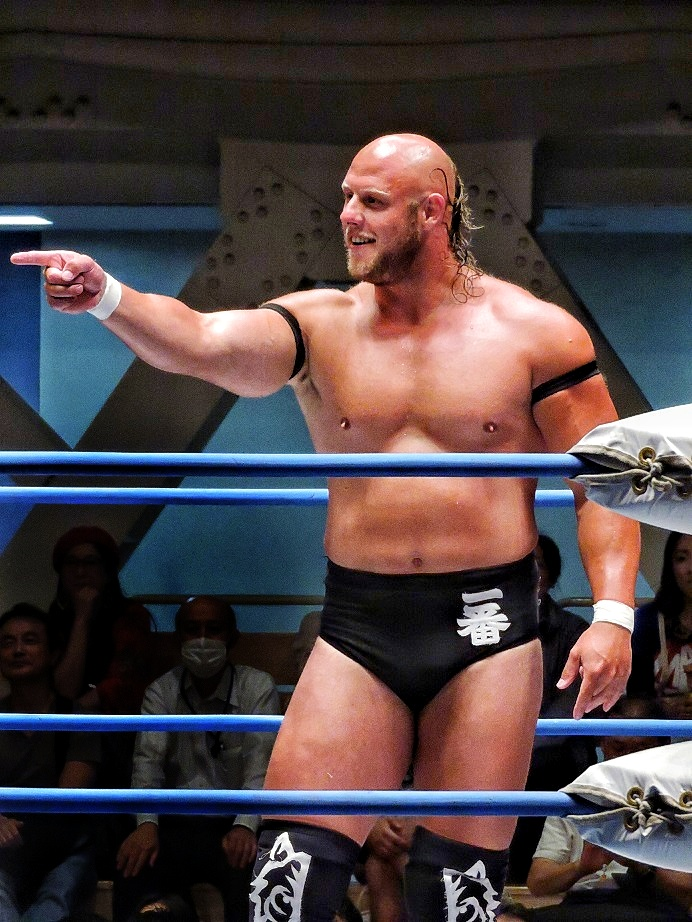
- Raideen in 2019

Personal information
- Born: Dylan James; 25 May 1991 (age 35) Auckland, New Zealand

Professional wrestling career
- Ring name(s): Dylan James; James Raideen; Dils O'Connor; Dils Deluxeo
- Billed height: 1.95 m (6 ft 5 in)
- Billed weight: 115 kg (254 lb)
- Trained by: Alfred Valentine; Bubba Ray Dudley; D-Von Dudley
- Debut: February 2010

Dylan James (born 25 May 1991) is a New Zealand professional wrestler and mixed martial artist. He is currently signed to Rizin Fighting Federation and Pro Wrestling Land's End. He is best known for his tenures with All Japan Pro Wrestling (AJPW), where he is a former World Tag Team Champion (with Ryoji Sai) and 2018 World's Strongest Tag Determination League tournament winner (with Joe Doering) and in Pro Wrestling Zero1 where he worked under the ring name James Raideen. He defeated Masato Tanaka to become a World Heavyweight Champion.

== Mixed martial arts career ==
On 27 September 2020, he made his mixed martial arts debut with Rizin Fighting Federation in a losing effort to Sudario Tsuyoshi, due to doctor stoppage after the first round.

== Mixed martial arts record ==
Professional record breakdown
1 match	0 wins	1 loss
By knockout	0	1

Res.	Record	Opponent	Method	Event	Date	Round	Time	Location	Notes
Loss	0–1	Sudario Tsuyoshi	TKO (doctor stoppage)	Rizin 24 – Saitama	27 September 2020	1	5:00	Saitama, Japan	

== Championships and accomplishments ==
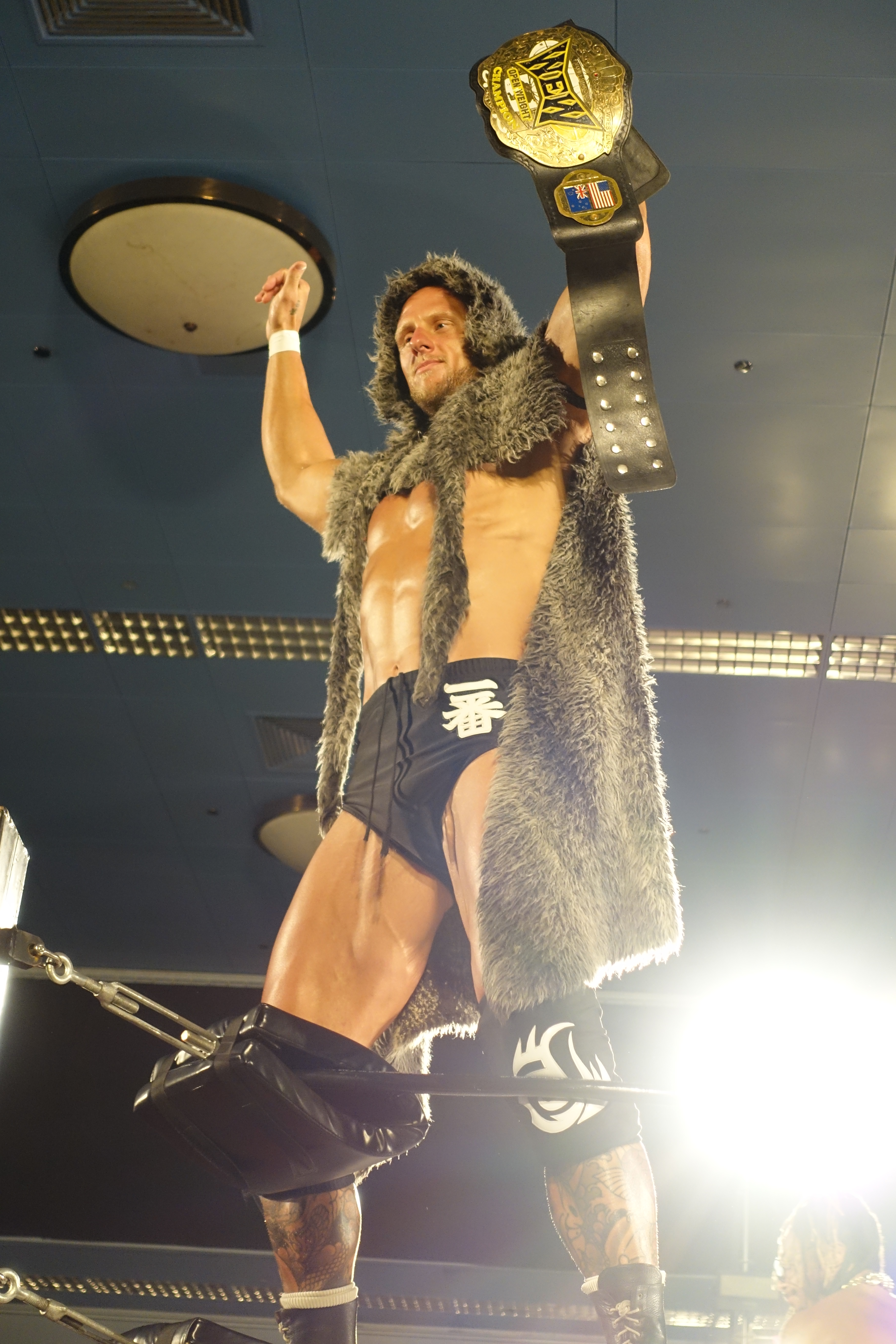
Dylan James is former longest reign WEW Heavyweight Champion

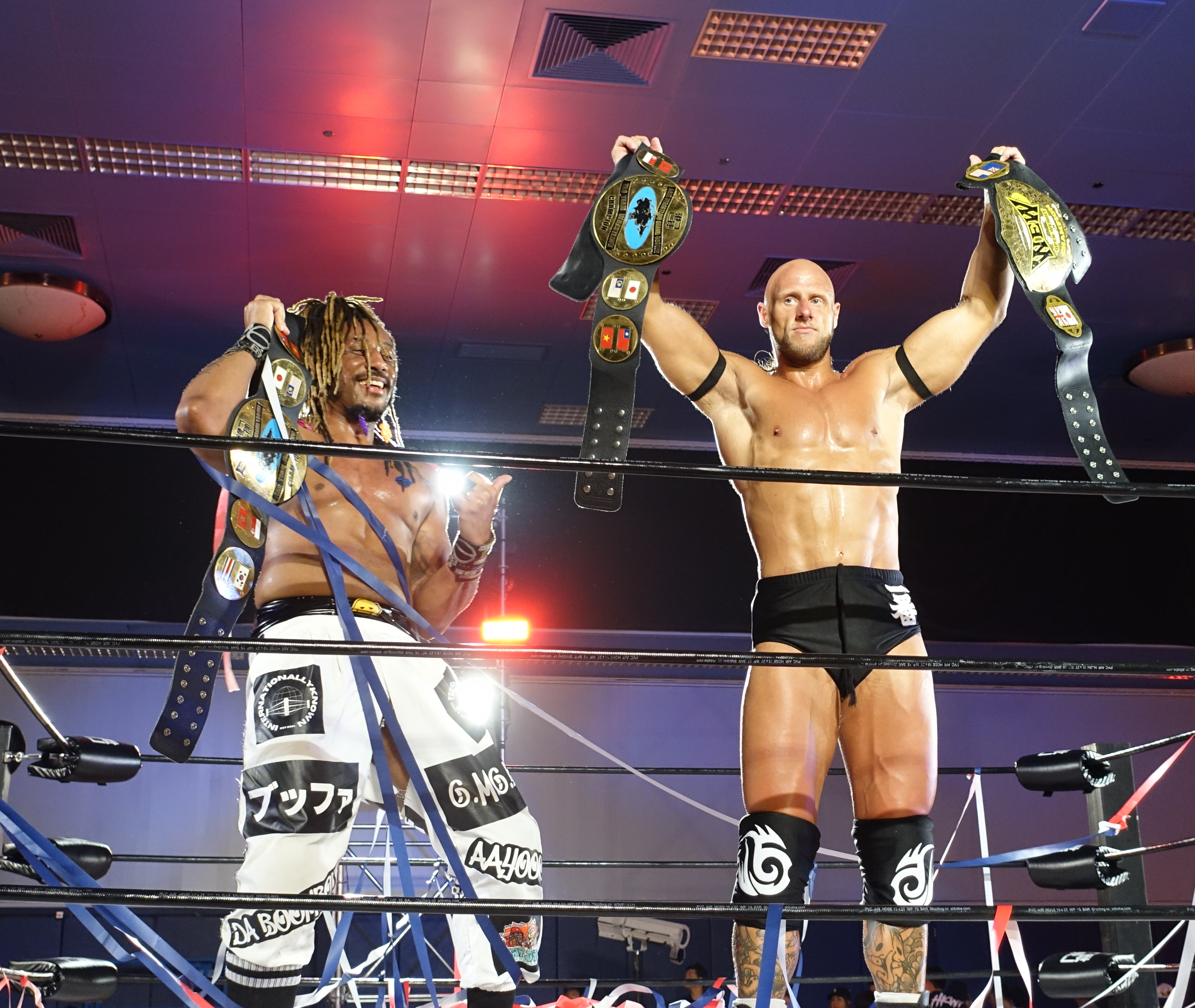
Dylan James is former AWGC Tag Team Champion with Buffa AAYOOO

- All Japan Pro Wrestling
  - World Tag Team Championship (1 time) – with Ryoji Sai
  - World's Strongest Tag Determination League (2018) – with Joe Doering
- Pro Wrestling Land's End
  - All Asia Heavyweight Championship (1 time, current)
  - Land's End One Day Tournament (2023)
- Hong Kong Pro Wrestling Federation
  - AWGC Tag Team Championship (1 time) – with Buffa AAYOOO
- Impact Pro Wrestling
  - IPW New Zealand Tag Team Championship (1 time) – with Dave Deluxeo
- Pro Wrestling A-TEAM
  - WEW Heavyweight Championship (1 time)
  - WEW World Tag Team Championship (1 time) with HASEGAWA
- Pro Wrestling Illustrated
  - Ranked No. 116 of the top 500 singles wrestlers in the PWI 500 in 2018
- Pro Wrestling Zero1
  - NWA Intercontinental Tag Team Championship (1 time) – with Masato Tanaka
  - NWA United National Heavyweight Championship (1 time)
  - World Heavyweight Championship (1 time)
  - Fire Festival (2013)
  - Furinkazan (2012) – with Zeus
