= Takuya Sugi =

Japanese professional wrestler

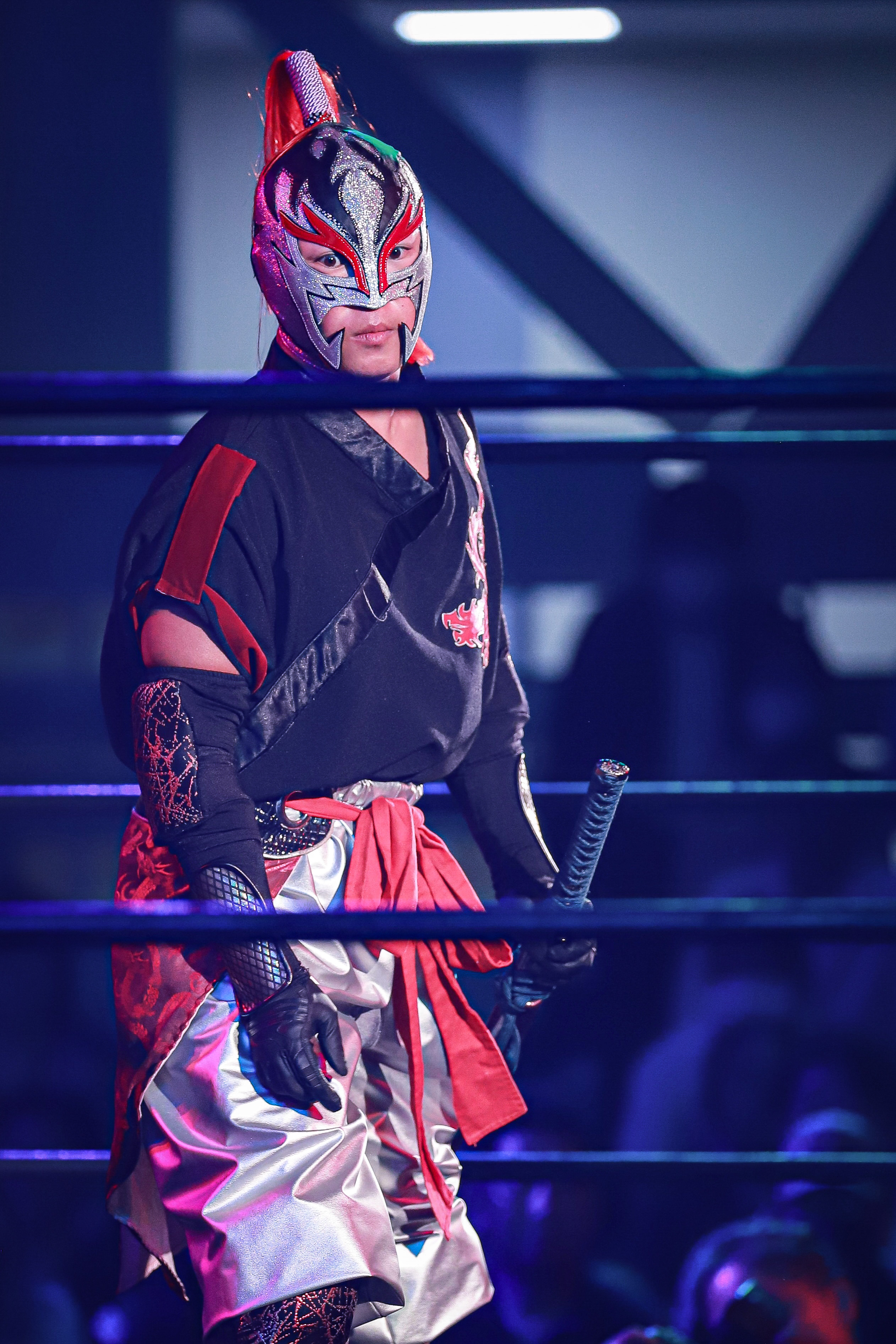
- Sugi in July 2023

Personal information
- Born: October 6, 1983 (age 42) Shizuoka City, Japan

Professional wrestling career
- Ring name(s): Sugi San; Sugi; El Blazer; Yoshitsune; Shanao; Mini Cima; Little Dragon; Hustle Kamen Ranger Red; Michinoku Ranger Gold; Ahii; The★Zest (2nd generation); Namazu Man; Rabbit Boy; Super Milo; Uwai #32; NOIZ; El Fuerte
- Billed height: 1.63 m (5 ft 4 in)
- Billed weight: 65 kg (143 lb)
- Billed from: Hustle Nebula (as Hustle Kamen Ranger Red); Hiraizumi (as Shanao/Yoshitsune)
- Trained by: Último Dragón; Jorge "Skayde" Rivera
- Debut: May 11, 2003

Takuya Sugi (杉卓也, Sugi Takuya; born October 6, 1983) is a Japanese professional wrestler. He currently works in Pro Wrestling Zero1 (Zero1) as Sugi (stylized in all capital letters), but he has used many aliases, most commonly Yoshitsune and Sugi, through his career in many Japanese promotions. He is mainly known for his high-flying abilities.

== Early life ==
He was born on October 6, 1983, the son of businesswoman Hiroko Sugi. He became interested in professional wrestling by influence of his older brother, becoming a fan of New Japan Pro Wrestling stars Antonio Inoki and Riki Choshu, as well as Keiji Muto, Masahiro Chono and Shinya Hashimoto. He trained in the same judo dojo as Shingo Suzuki, who later also became a professional wrestler under the ring name Raicho. When he finally became a wrestler, Sugi desired to wrestle in a power-based wrestling style, but his small frame and talent for acrobatics forced him to become a high-flying wrestler.

== Career ==
=== Toryumon (2002–2004) ===
Immediately after graduating in the 11th Toryumon school class term, Sugi debuted in 2003 in Toryumon Mexico, moving to the Toryumon X brand shortly after. He went under the gimmick of Mini Cima (ミニCIMA, Mini Cima), a lighter version of the popular Toryumon wrestler Cima, who was a part of the Mini Crazy Max stable along with Suwacito and Small Dandy Fuji. Aligning themselves as tweeners, they got into a feud with babyface faction Sailor Boys (Taiji Ishimori, Kei Sato and Shu Sato), having several matches against them, sometimes accompanied by senior members of the actual Crazy Max.

In December 2003, Mini Cima and his team competed in the Young Dragons Cup 2003 scramble match, but none of them grabbed the prize, being Takeshi Minamino the eventual tournament winner. They would be more successful at the Yamaha Cup 2004 tag team tournament, with Mini Cima and Suwacito defeating Manabu Murakami and Naoki Tanizaki in the first round and the Sailor Boys in the second to crown themselves as winners. On September 9, 2003 the group competed in an elimination match for the UWA World Welterweight Championship, eliminating the team of Los Carros Exóticos (Gallardo, Lambo Miura and Murcielago) before falling short to Los Salseros Japoneses (Minamino, Pineapple Hanai and Mango Fukuda). This was the Toryumon X final event, with the promotion folding shortly after. Mini Crazy Max had its last reunion in the special event Dragon Fire The Final Challenge on October 14, where they competed in another special challenge match.

=== Hustle (2004–2006) ===
In September 2004, although still based on Toryumon, Sugi and his partners started wrestling for the Hustle promotion. They appeared as the Hustle Kamen Rangers, a Power Rangers-inspired super sentai stable that worked as a special division of the Hustle Army led by top babyface Naoya Ogawa. Sugi himself played Hustle Kamen Red (ハッスル仮面レッド, Hassuru Kamen Reddo) (a role formerly played by Masaki Okimoto), and teamed up with Hustle Kamen Blue and Hustle Kamen Yellow as a power trio. They competed in the undercard of events against villainous characters from the heel Takada Monster Army commanded by Generalissimo Takada; their usual opponents were Devil Pierroth I and Devil Pierroth II, whom they defeated in many occasions.

In the event Hustle House Vol.10, held on October 27, 2005, Hustle Kamen Rangers were defeated by Demon Spider Blue, Demon Spider Yellow and Riser Glen, being the latter a character come from the TV tokusatsu series Phantom Star God Justirisers, only brainwashed to serve the Monster Army. In order to counter him, Hustle Kamen Rangers introduced another character from said series, Liosazer, who helped them to defeat the heel stable at the Hustlemania 2005 event and turn Riser again to good. The rangers would still competing for Hustle, being later opposed by an itako wrestler named Kyou Itako.

On February 10, 2006, the Monster Army introduced a cadre of evil clones of the Hustle Kamen Rangers, called the Monster Kamen Rangers. They consistently defeated Sugi and his team, forcing them to introduce a new member, Hustle Kamen Orange, in order to get the first win against the villains. The win was short-lived, however, as the Monster Kamen Rangers defeated them again, and this time they kidnapped Hustle Kamen Yellow in order to brainwash him. Now with Yellow as an enemy, Red and new member Hustle Kamen Green attempted to reason with him, but they were beaten when Yellow pinned Red. The storyline continued until Hustlemania 2006, where they finally managed to bring Yellow back and defeat the Monster Kamen Rangers for good. The team then announced they would travel to the stars in order to defend the peace and justice beyond Hustle, ceasing their appearances on the promotion.

=== Michinoku Pro Wrestling (2004–2009) ===
Sugi started wrestling for Michinoku Pro Wrestling (Michinoku Pro) in October 2004. He debuted during the Futaritabi Tag Team Tournament 2004 under the gimmick of Michinoku Ranger Gold (MICHINOKU レンジャー金, Michinoku Renjā Kin), a super sentai character similar to the one he played in Hustle. Teaming up with Michinoku Ranger Silver, Sugi got important victories over Jinsei Shinzaki and Shinjitsu Nohashi and Los Salseros Japoneses, but they did not win the league. They kept their gimmicks until December, when Sugi adopted the gimmick of Shanao (遮那王, Shanao), a masked Kurama-dera Buddhist monk inspired on the historical Minamoto no Yoshitsune, who went as "Shanao" in his youth in honor to Vairocana. Shanao would come to the ring carrying a katana and saying prayers, and drew popularity among the audience for his high-risk, aerial style of wrestling.

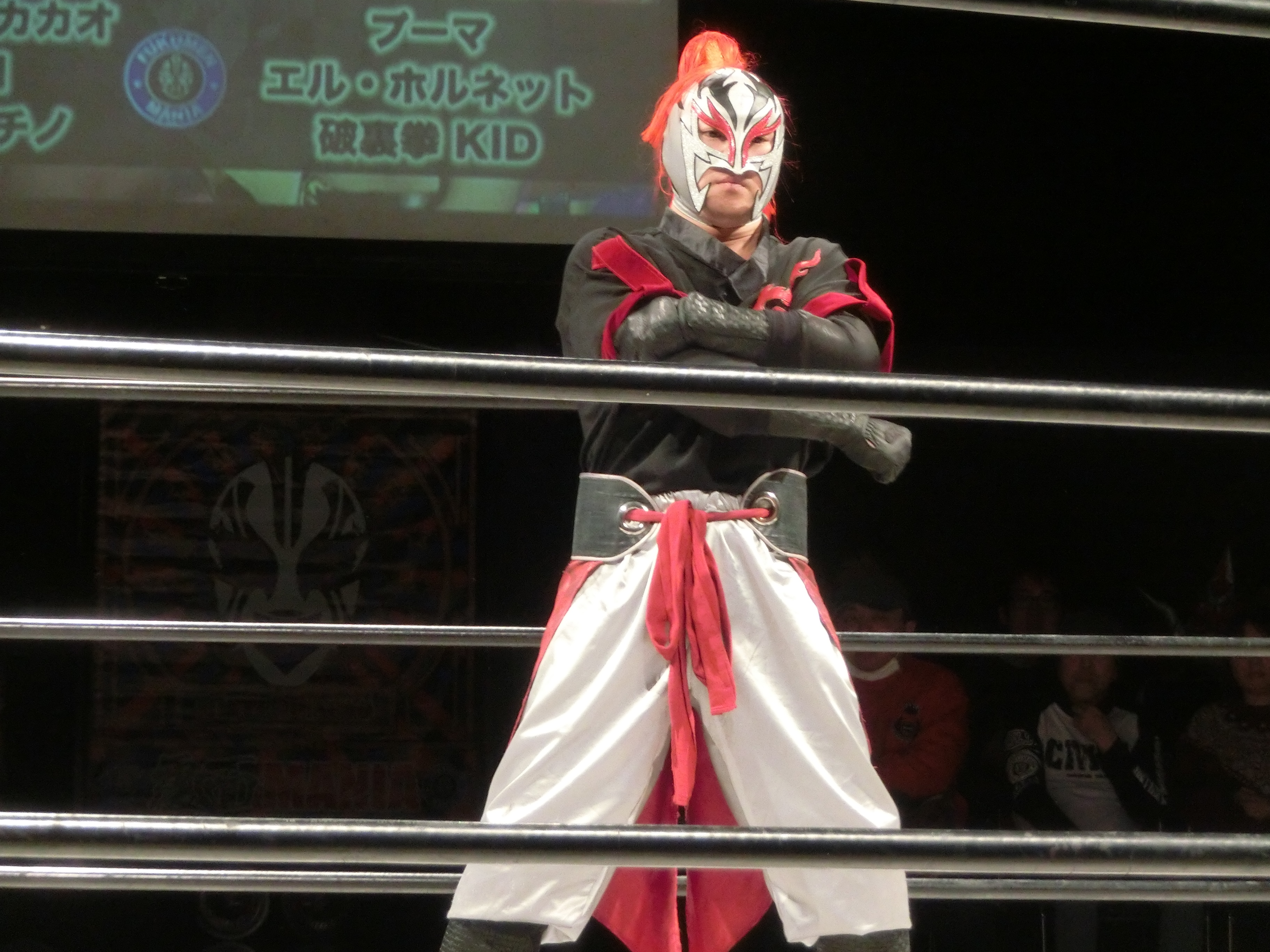
SUGI in 2019.

In 2005, Shanao joined forces with the Sailor Boys (now composed solely by Kei and Shu Sato) to participate in the Michinoku Trios League, being unsuccessful. The final night of the tournament, from which they had been eliminated by points, Shanao teamed up with his master, The Tiger II, to defeat Kagetora and Shinjitsu Nohashi. The alliance with the Sailor Boys lasted until mid-year, when Shanao formed a tag team with Rasse. He also had a brief tenure in the Tetsujin Tournament, but he was forced to forfeit most of his matches due to an injury. Shanao returned on September 10 in a losing effort to Takeshi Minamino, but he got his revenge the same night, defeating Minamino and Los Salseros Japoneses along with Kagetora, Gaina and Hayato Fujita.

Kagetora and he eventually kept their alliance and participated in the Futaritabi Tag Team Tournament 2005, which they won after beating Los Salseros Japoneses again, but Kagetora suddenly turned heel and attacked Shanao, going to form the villainous stable Stoned. Now back with Rasse, Shanao and his partner had a shot for the Tohoku Tag Team Championship held by The Great Sasuke and Dick Togo, but despite their effort, they were beaten. Days after, Shanao announced he was going to perform a genpuku ceremony in order to advance in his career, which was officiated by Jinsei Shinzaki. Shanao then changed his name to Yoshitsune (義経, Yoshitsune), openly showing his character, and changed his outfit to a samurai-like attire in purple, red and golden, product of a coproduction between M-Pro and FromSoftware to promote their videogame Yoshitsune Eiyuden Shura. Yoshitsune had his first match teaming up with Shinzaki, who came out dressed as Saitō Musashibō Benkei, defeating Rasse and Garuda with his new Shura finishing maneuver.

The next year, Yoshitsune's fame granted him a title match for the Tohoku Junior Heavyweight Championship against Taka Michinoku, falling short in his challenge. Nonetheless, Yoshitsune allied with The Great Sasuke and the now babyface Los Salseros Japoneses to wage war against Stoned, exchanging wins with them. He performed a new title pursuit by taking part in a tournament for the Tohoku Tag Team Championship with Rei as his partner, losing to Makoto Oishi and Shiori Asahi; Yoshitsune took part in the 2006 edition of the Tetsujin Tournament, but he had to relinquish it again due to an injury. Upon his recovering, Yoshitsune recruited Rasse to compete in the Futaritabi Tag Team Tournament 2006, but success seemed to be away from him that year, as they were eliminated at the finals by Kei and Shu Sato.

In 2007, Yoshitsune qualified for the Fukumen World League by defeating Ken45º and Shinjitsu Nohashi in respective matches. During the tournament, he eliminated Shibaten first and legendary New Japan Pro-Wrestling (NJPW) member Jyushin Thunder Liger second, but he eventually fell to Mexican representative Atlantis thanks to an intervention by Atlantis's cornerman Olímpico. Ended the league, Yoshitsune returned to his alliance with the home army and joined The Great Sasuke for the Futaritabi Tag Team League; although Sasuke and him eliminated the team of Rasse and Kagetora, an injury to Sasuke forced them to exit the tournament and allow their opponents to advance round. Stardom finally came to Yoshitsune on November, however, when he defeated Osaka Pro Wrestling representative Gaina in a match for the Tohoku Junior Heavyweight Championship. Yoshitsune then would open 2008 becoming a double champion, when Sasuke returned from his injury and joined him to defeat Rasse and Kagetora for the title.

Sugi retained his titles for most of 2008, beating challengers like Rasse, Takeshi Minamino, Shinji Nohashi and Tigers Mask, as well as the team of Mens Teioh and Shinobu. However, he would get in a new feud when Hayato Fujita turned heel and formed the faction Kowloon with the remnants of Stoned. After months of warfare, Hayato challenged Sugi to a match for the Tohoku Junior Heavyweight title, and he won the bout and the championship in an upset. Only months after, Sasuke and Yoshitsune faced Kei and Shu Sato from Kowloon in a match to unify their tag team titles with the UWA World Tag Team Championship, but they were defeated and lost the belts. Concluded his reigns, Yoshitsune announced his departure from Michinoku Pro and had his last match in March 2009.

=== Dragondoor and El Dorado Wrestling (2005–2007) ===
Along with most of his Toryumon class, Sugi joined the Dragondoor promotion in July 2005. He was introduced in a vignette by top babyface Taiji Ishimori, who described him as a close ally carrying the genes of Último Dragón. As such, Sugi appeared as Little Dragon (リトル・ドラゴン, Ritoru Doragon), a character wearing a mask and suit patterned after Dragón, very much like the wrestler Dragon Kid from rival promotion Dragon Gate. In his first match, Little Dragon teamed up with Ishimori and the rest of his allies, Kota Ibushi and Milanito Collection a.t., in a losing effort against the popular stable Aagan Iisou (Shuji Kondo, Yasshi and Takuya Sugawara). His next and last high level match in the short-lived promotion would be at the final event, fighting with Ishimori against Stoned (Kei Sato and Shu Sato), being defeated after an intervention by Kagetora and Maguro Ooma. Dragondoor folded down shortly after.

When the promotion was reopened as El Dorado Wrestling in April 2006, Sugi returned with the rest of wrestlers. This time he took the gimmick of El Blazer (エルブレイザー, Eru Bureizā), a mysterious, bizarre phoenix-like character in a gold and blue armored outfit. Blazer formed a tag team with Milanito Collection a.t. and took part in the very first match of the promotion, getting a victory over Kei and Shu Sato. They also avenged their defeats to Aagan Iisou by beating them with Kota Ibushi's aid, and also took another victory over Stoned in a Global Professional Wrestling Alliance (GPWA) event along with Jumping Kid Okimoto. In December 2006, the trio split up to compete in the Treasure Hunters Tag Tournament 2006, as Ibushi teamed up with Milano Collection A.T. while Blazer stayed in Milanito's side; Sugi and his ally were defeated, and Milano and Kota advanced round before being eliminated by Dick Togo and Shuji Kondo at the finals. Milanito and Blazer, however, won the reserve bout of the tournament, defeating the Sato brothers through an intervention of a now unaligned Kagetora. In Sugi's last match in the promotion, he teamed up with Milano and Milanito to defeat a Stoned cell aided by Harashima. Blazer then announced he was going freelance, and put an official end to his team with Milanito, leaving El Dorado.

=== All Japan Pro Wrestling (2006–2008) ===
On August 20, 2006, Sugi made his first apparition in All Japan Pro Wrestling (AJPW) playing the character of Ahii, the result of a cooperation between Sanrio and AJPW. He was introduced by Keiji Mutoh, and revealed himself as a strange character wearing an orange and black full body suit that represented the Mexican Habanero chili pepper. He made his first in-ring work the same night, entering after the main event to save Mutoh, Masanobu Fuchi and Kaz Hayashi from an attack by the Voodoo Murders, and his official debut one day later, defeating VM member Voodoo Mask. Ahii remained as an ally to Mutoh and his babyface wrestlers against Voodoo Murders until November, when he got his own opponents in the form of Mastodon and Tow Van John, two personal enemies of his. Their enmity would be resolved on February 17, 2007, when Ahii defeated them both in a handicap match with the aid of his storyline brother, a green version of Ahii (played by Masaki Okimoto).

Sugi returned to AJPW on February 15, 2008 for a special event copromoted with Playboy. He played the one night gimmick of Rabbit Boy (ラビット・ボーイ, Rabitto Bōi), a character wearing a rabbit mask and a black playboy jacket. In his only apparition, Rabbit Boy defeated Giant Jet.

On December 23, Sugi made his last apparition for AJPW for another one night character, this time as part of AJPW's usual copromotions with A Bathing Ape. Sugi portrayed Super Milo, a monkey superhero wearing in green and yellow, and teamed up with Teriyaki Boy to defeat Ebessan III and Kuishinbo Kamen in a comedy match.

=== Independent circuit (2006–2009) ===
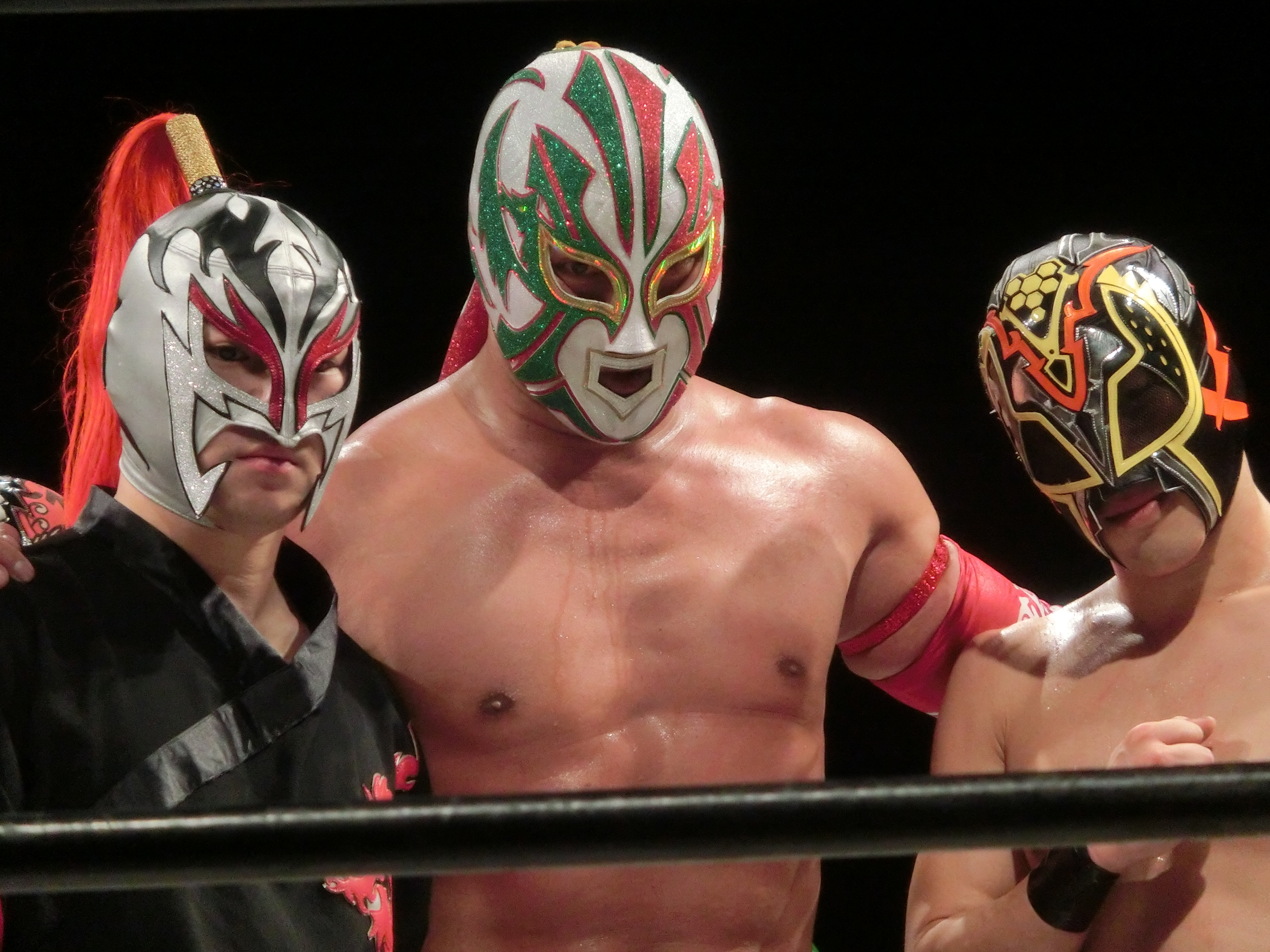
SUGI along with Mr. Cacao (center) and El Hornet (right) in 2019.

He also appeared as Yoshitsune in some shows of Big Mouth LOUD and several others Japanese independent promotions, including the New Japan Pro-Wrestling LOCK UP sub-brand.

Sugi continued using the El Blazer gimmick as his main freelancing character. El Blazer then turned to a comedic character prone to mysteriously faint at his entrance, and had an appearance in Dramatic Dream Team (DDT)'s brand Cruiser's Game wrestling against Mikami after (kayfabe) having been smoking marijuana.

Soon after becoming a freelancer, Sugi continued appearing randomly in several Japanese promotions as El Blazer, including IGF.

Starting from June 3, 2007, Sugi appeared in Kensuke Office as Namazu Man (なまずマン, "Catfish Man"), but shortly after, Namazu Man started to be played by other wrestlers.

Another gimmick he used in 2007 is UWAI # 32, a robot character only used in UWAI Station.

On December 29, 2008, Sugi appeared in an Akiba Pro Wrestling event as El Fuerte (エル・フォルテ), a character inspired from the Street Fighter video game saga.

=== Pro Wrestling Zero1 (2007–2009) ===
Sugi started wrestling for Pro Wrestling Zero1-Max (Zero1-Max) in May 2007 under his El Blazer character. After an unsuccessful battle royal match for the AWA World Junior Heavyweight Championship, which was won by Dick Togo, Blazer aligned himself under Masato Tanaka's Sword Army, getting in battles against Takao Omori's Axe Army. He got a shot at the ZERO1-MAX International Junior Heavyweight Championship held by Dragon Gate wrestler Masaaki Mochizuki, but he was unsuccessful. Mochizuki offered him to team up and invited him to his promotion.

For most of his tenure in the company, however, Sugi ditched his Blazer identity and played a new character, The☆ZEST, sponsored by the homonymous Japanese pachinko company. The gimmick had been played before by wrestler Kamikaze, and would be later played by him again. On July 24, Zest won the WWA Junior Lightweight Championship by beating Osamu Namiguchi, and retained it until April 6, when Sugi relinquished both the character and the title in order to adopt yet a new gimmick, Noiz, sponsored by rock band UchuSentai:Noiz. Now as Noiz, Sugi defeated Kamikaze as Zest and won again the championship. NOIZ also inherited Blazer's loyalty to Masato Tanaka, wrestling for him occasionally, and retained the title before Osamu Namiguchi before vacating him upon his departure from Zero1.

=== Dragon Gate (2008) ===
Blazer originally debuted in Dragon Gate in March 2008 as a Zero1 representative, but he was in storyline recognized by Kenichiro Arai as a Toryumon graduate. Blazer's first match was a special tag team with fellow high-flyer Pac against Tozawa-juku (Arai and Taku Iwasa), which he lost, but he also aided New Hazard (BxB Hulk and Shinobu) in the Mochizuki Buyuden events and Typhoon (Anthony W. Mori and Cima) against the Muscle Outlaw'z. In April, Blazer took part in a tournament for the Open the Brave Gate Championship, eliminating Genki Horiguchi but being eliminated himself by Gamma following outside interference. After his unsuccessful feud with Muscle Outlaw'z, Blazer concluded his tenure in Dragon Gate forming an alliance with fellow outsiders Takeshi Minamino and Shinjitsu Nohashi, defeating Hayato Fujita, Munenori Sawa and Yuta Yoshikawa in Mochizuki Buyuden and WORLD-1 (mcKZ & Naoki Tanizaki) & Super Shenlong in Dragon Gate NEX.

=== Pro Wrestling Guerrilla (2008) ===
Sugi made his American debut (as El Blazer) for Pro Wrestling Guerrilla (PWG) on May 17, 2008. Replacing Kota Ibushi, he teamed with Kagetora on PWG's second annual DDT4 tournament, defeating Scott Lost and Joey Ryan in the first round, but losing to the PWG World Tag Team Champions Kevin Steen and El Generico in a title match in the next.

=== Lucha Libre AAA World Wide (2009–2012) ===
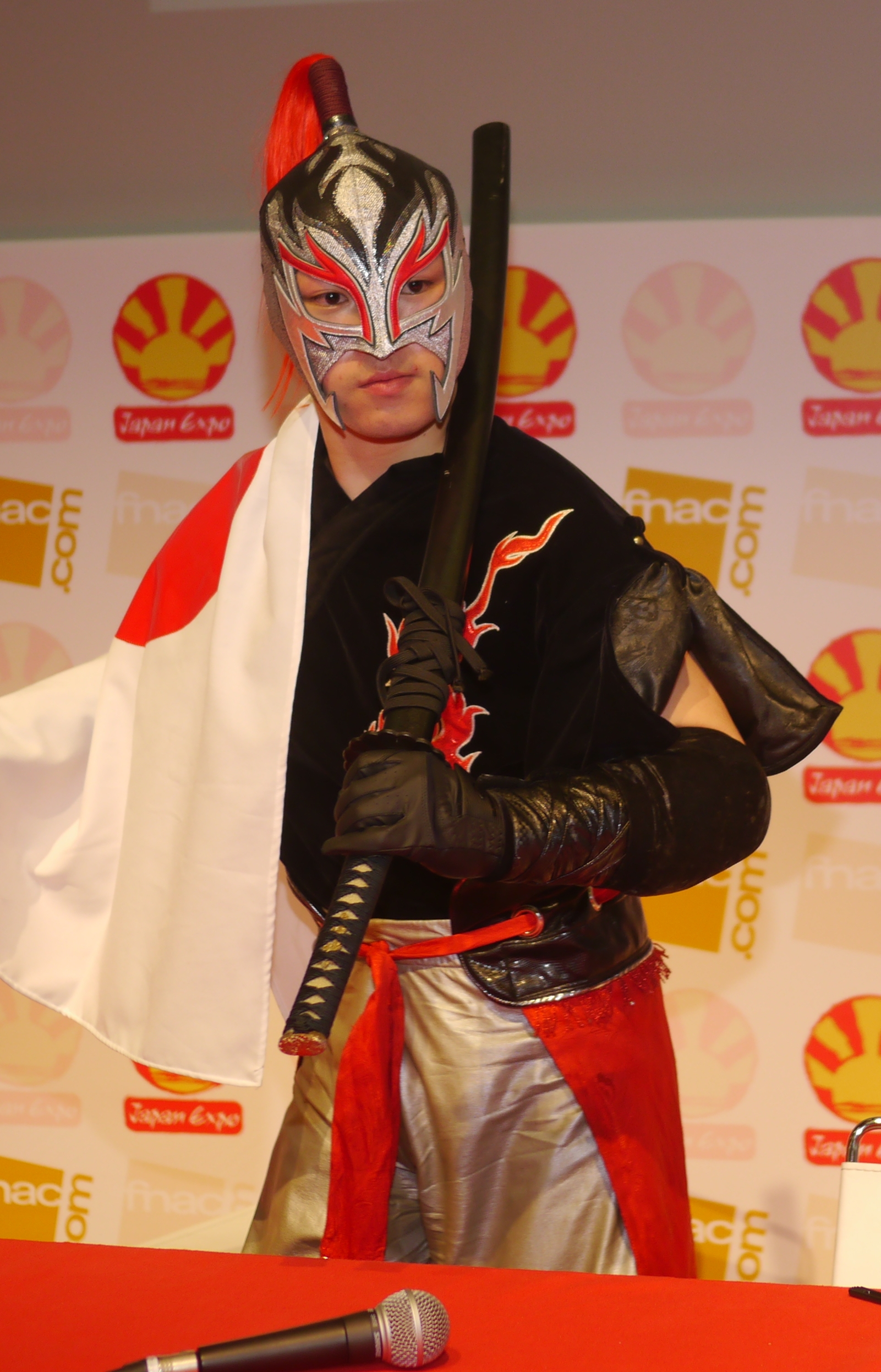
Sugi in 2011

Sugi signed up with Lucha Libre AAA World Wide (AAA) in 2009 and made his return to México, now under a modified, black and red version of his Yoshitsune outfit and the name of Sugi San (his last name followed by the Japanese honorific -san). He was introduced by Kenzo Suzuki as a part of his rudo stable La Yakuza, thus clearly turning heel for the first time in Sugi's his career. The faction, which also included El Oriental, amassed a number of tag team wins until a match in Verano de Escándalo where they fell to The Psycho Circus. On August 30, Sugi competed individually in a Steel Cage Match where the last wrestler would be fired; Sugi escaped safely, but he injured his knee upon doing a theatrical backflip from the cage to the floor.

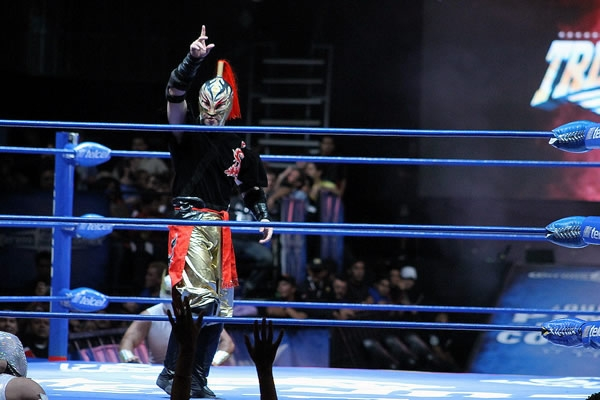
Sugi in an AAA event.

A month later, with La Yakuza dissolved and now unaligned, Sugi competed in a Five Way Ladder Match for the AAA World Cruiserweight Championship along with Extreme Tiger, Jack Evans, Rocky Romero and Teddy Hart, but he would be (kayfabe) injured by a piledriver by Hart and had to be stretchered out while Tiger won the title. After his return from the injury, Sugi took part in the Torneo Alas de Oro 2009, leaving in second place along with Billy Boy. On October 9, Suzuki gathered La Yakuza again with Go Shiozaki replacing El Oriental to face Los Wagner Maniacos (Dr. Wagner Jr., Electroshock & Último Gladiador), but they were defeated. Afterwards, Sugi announced his return to Japan, leaving AAA.

After a year of hiatus, Sugi would compete in Pro Wrestling Noah (Noah) as an AAA representative, now under the name of Sugi (in all caps), getting in a feud with Ronin and Taiji Ishimori. He returned to México along with Ronin, having some touring matches against him, and finally coming back to TV as an unofficial member of Aero Star's stable Real Fuerza Aerea. On June 28, Sugi and Ronin were sent to Paris, France in order to represent puroresu in the Japan Expo 12th Impact, returning to México on July 5.

On July 9, 2012, Sugi held a press conference to announce his involvement in a conspiracy at the behest of AAA mask maker Masahiro Hayashi, that had gotten Kazushige Nosawa and Io Shirai arrested for marijuana possession and smuggling.

=== Return to Michinoku Pro Wrestling (2016) ===
Following the drug smuggling scandal, Sugi remained inactive for more than four years, with the exception of a single match held on November 18, 2015, when he faced Takeshi Minamino in an event held at Shinjuku Face to celebrate the 10th anniversary since his debut. After this long hiatus, Sugi returned to the ring for a charity event held on August 28, 2016, in support of the population hit by the 2016 Kumamoto earthquake. Shortly thereafter, on September 16, he competed in a Michinoku Pro event for the first time in seven years, entering the 2016 Fukumen World League. He defeated Leprechaun and Eisa8, but was eliminated by Carístico at the semi-finals.

=== Return to Zero1 (2017–2021) ===
After a few appearances in Pro Wrestling Land's End (Land's End) in 2017, Sugi returned to Pro Wrestling Zero1 (Zero1) in August. He challenged unsuccessfully Kotaro Suzuki for the International Junior Heavyweight and NWA World Junior Heavyweight Championships, after which he declared he would challenge Ikuto Hidaka and Takuya Sugawara for the NWA International Lightweight Tag Team Championship with an unknown partner, who would be revealed to be Psycho. Sugi and him defeated Hidaka and Sugawara in a non-title match, but failed at taking the titles. Sugi replaced Psycho by Sean Guinness for the Furinkazan Tag Tournament 2017, only to be eliminated in the first round by Hidaka and Sugawara again. He spent the next weeks teaming with several wrestlers against his old enemy faction Voodoo Murders, until he announced Masamune as his next tag team partner in his quest for the tag titles. On January 1, 2018, Sugi officially joined Zero1, and the same day, he and Masamune won the NWA International Lightweight Tag Team Championship from Sugawara and Hidaka.

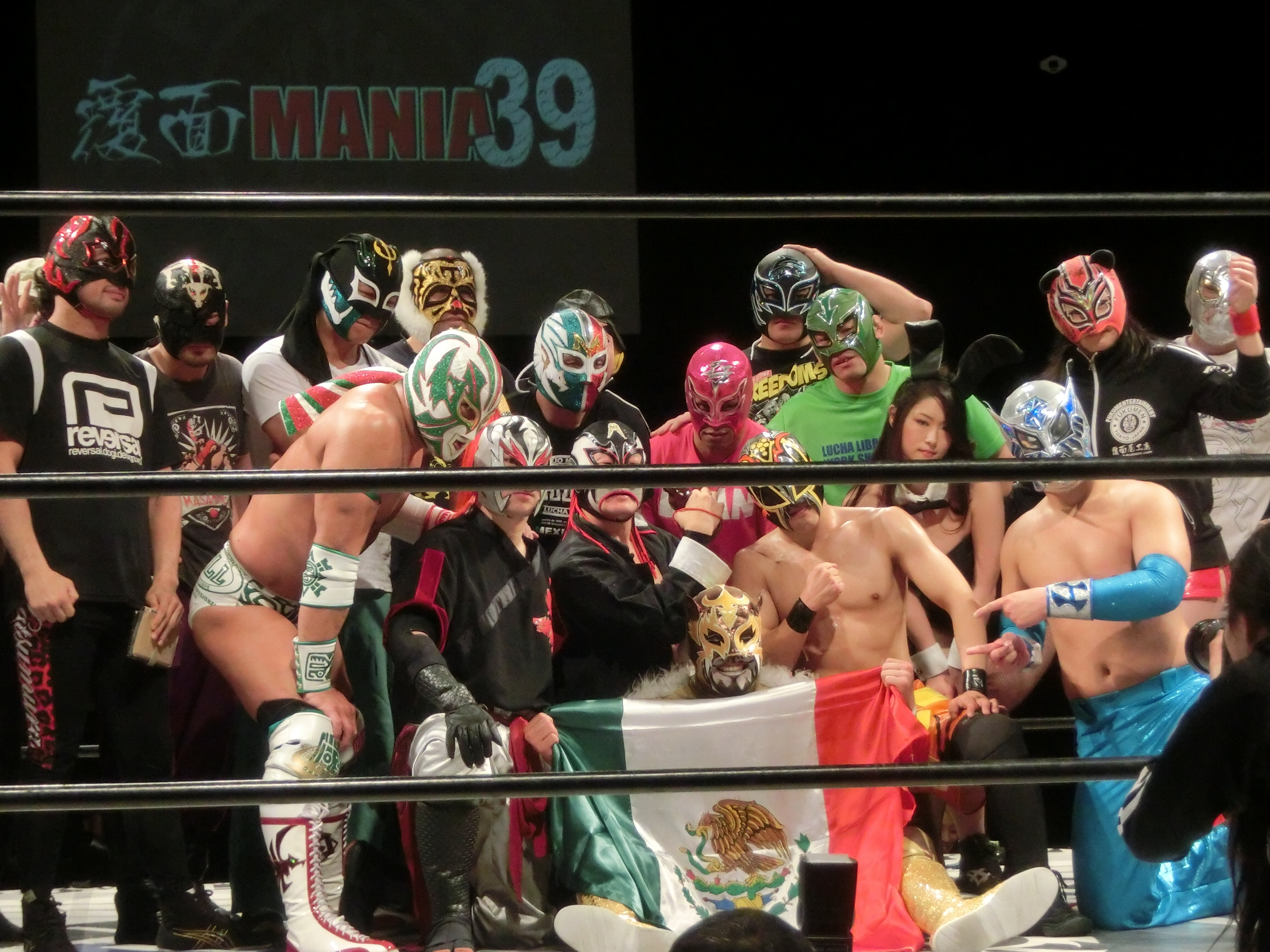
SUGI at the Fukumen Mania 2019.

Their reign ended in June, when Sugi and Masamune lost the titles to the new team of Ikuto Hidaka and Fuminori Abe. The same month, Sugi joined Kohei Sato and challenged Masato Tanaka and Yuji Hino for the NWA Intercontinental Tag Team Championship, but they were defeated. He followed with a significantly successful tenure in the Fire Festival 2018, scoring wins over Hino, Shinjiro Otani and Hiroshi Yamato, though victory escaped his grasp again. In November, Sugi would prove better in the short Tenka-Ichi Junior Tournament 2018 for the vacated International Junior Heavyweight Championship and NWA World Junior Heavyweight Championship, winning the tournament and the titles after beating Tatsuhito Takaiwa, Asuka and Hayata. Now as a champion, he resumed his team Kohei Sato to compete in the Furinkazan Tag Tournament 2018, where they also won by defeating Chris Vice and Shogun Okamoto at the finals.

Sugi invested early 2019 in further championship pursuings. He retained his singles titles against Ikuto Hidaka, Shoki Kitamura and Tatsuhito Takaiwa. However, tag team titles remained away from him, with two failed challenges for the NWA International Lightweight Tag Team Championships and NWA Intercontinental Tag Team Championships teaming up with Hagane Shinnou and usual partner Sato respectively. In July, he participated in the Fire Festival 2019, where he gained victories over Yuya Aoki, Asuka and Super Tiger II, but he was unable to win the tournament after a double countout with Yuji Hino. He looked to improve his odds in the Tenka-Ichi Junior Tournament 2019, reaching the finals over Raicho and Sean Guiness, but being shockingly eliminated by Hub. This streak continued in the Furinkazan Tag Tournament 2019, where Sugi and Dragon Gate representative Kenichiro Arai were defeated by Shuji Kondo and Takuya Sugawara in a match of former Toryumon wrestlers.

In January 2020, Sugi lost his championships to Hub and was eliminated from the Tenka-Ichi 2020 by Raicho, but he bounced back by allying with the latter and defeating the former and Billy Ken Kid for the promotion's tag team titles. Beginning 2021, Sugi ended his exclusive participation with Zero1 and became a freelancer again.

== Personal life ==
On July 9, Mexico-based Japanese wrestler Takuya Sugi held a press conference and confessed to planting the drugs on Nosawa and Shirai.

== Championships and accomplishments ==
- All Japan Pro Wrestling
  - World Junior Heavyweight Championship (2 times)
- Kyushu Pro-Wrestling
  - Kyushu Pro-Wrestling Tag Team Championship (1 time) - with Raicho
- Michinoku Pro Wrestling
  - Tohoku Junior Heavyweight Championship (1 time)
  - Tohoku Tag Team Championship (2 times) – with Great Sasuke (1) and Kagetora (1)
  - Fukumen World League Qualifying Tournament (2007)
  - Futaritabi Tag Team League (2005) – with Kagetora
  - M-12 Battle Royal (2006) with Kagetora
- Pro Wrestling Illustrated
  - Ranked No. 346 of the 500 best singles wrestlers in the PWI 500 in 2022
- Pro Wrestling Zero1
  - International Junior Heavyweight Championship (1 time)
  - NWA World Junior Heavyweight Championship (1 time)
  - NWA International Lightweight Tag Team Championship (2 times) – with Masamune (1) and Raicho (1, final)
  - WWA World Junior Heavyweight Championship (Zero1 version) (2 times)
  - Tenkaichi Junior (2018)
  - Furinkazan (2018) – with Kohei Sato
- Toryumon X
  - Yamaha Cup Tag Tournament (2004) – with SUWAcito
- Valerie Office
  - Copa El Jefe (2012) – with Argos
