= Ryoji Sai =

Zainichi Korean wrestler (born 1980)

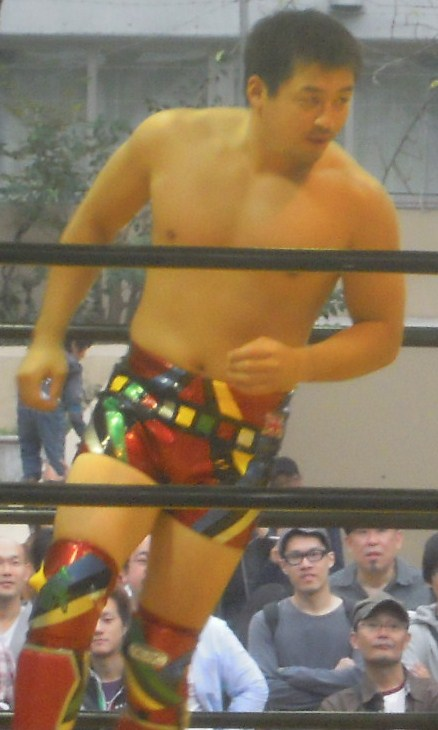

Personal information
- Born: Choe Yeong-i (최영이); June 3, 1980 (age 46) Osaka, Japan

Professional wrestling career
- Ring name: Ryoji Sai
- Billed height: 6 ft 3 in (1.91 m)
- Billed weight: 231 lb (105 kg)
- Trained by: Gerard Gordeau; Zero1 Dojo
- Debut: September 1, 2001

Ryoji Sai (崔 領二, Sai Ryōji), born Choe Yeong-i (Korean: 최영이; June 3, 1980) is a Korean professional wrestler, mixed martial artist and promoter who currently owns and operates Pro Wrestling Land's End, where he is a former All Asia Heavyweight Champion. He is best known for working for Pro Wrestling Zero1, where he is a former two-time World Heavyweight Champion.

He is the older brother of mixed martial artist Young Choi, also known as Ryo Sai.

== Career ==
Ryoji Sai is a third-generation Zainichi Korean who was born in Osaka, Japan. His parents own a restaurant near Tsuruhashi Station. At age 15, Sai attended the Sidmouth International School in Sidmouth, England. He then attended Bloxham School in Oxfordshire from 1996 to 1999. While in Europe, he studied martial arts under Gerard Gordeau in the Netherlands.

Upon returning to Japan, Sai joined Pro Wrestling Zero-One (Zero1) and made his debut on September 1, 2001, at the Fire Festival against Igor Meindert in a non-tournament match. From 2002 to 2004, he was out of professional wrestling due to an unknown ailment. Upon returning in 2004, he began regularly teaming with Kohei Sato, winning the NWA Intercontinental Tag Team Championship twice, in 2005 and 2006.

Sai twice finished as the runner-up in the 2006 and 2007 Fire Festival tournaments, losing to Masato Tanaka both times. He also appeared for the Hustle wrestling promotion while Zero1 had a working agreement with Hustle. In late 2008 and early 2009, Sai appeared on the popular Fuji TV show Ainori (あいのり), under the name "Wrestler" (レスラー, Resurā).

== Championships and accomplishments ==
- All Japan Pro Wrestling

- World Tag Team Championship (2 times) – with Dylan James (1) & Zeus (1)

- Apache Pro-Wrestling Army

- WEW World Tag Team Championship (1 time) – with Tetsuhiro Kuroda

- Hustle

- Hustle Super Tag Team Championship (1 time) – with Wataru Sakata

- Pro Wrestling Land's End

- All Asia Heavyweight Championship (1 time)

- Pro Wrestling Illustrated

- Ranked No. 220 of the top 500 singles wrestlers in the PWI 500 in 2014

- Pro Wrestling Zero1

- NWA Intercontinental Tag Team Championship (3 times) – with Kohei Sato (2) and Osamu Namiguchi (1)
- NWA United National Heavyweight Championship (1 time)
- World Heavyweight Championship (2 times)
- Fire Festival (2009, 2014)
- Passion Cup Tag Tournament (2008) – with Kohei Sato

== MMA record ==
Professional record breakdown
4 matches	1 win	1 loss
By knockout	1	1
By submission	0	0
By decision	0	0
By disqualification	0	0
Draws	1	
No contests	1	

Res.	Record	Opponent	Method	Event	Date	Round	Time	Location	Notes
Loss	1-1-1 (1)	Kenichi Serizawa	TKO (Punches)	Titan Fighting Championship 2	January 21, 2001	2	3:32	Tokyo, Japan	
Win	1-0-1 (1)	Koichi Sato	TKO (Punches)	Titan Fighting Championship 2	January 21, 2001	1	2:54	Tokyo, Japan	
NC	0-0-1 (1)	Koichi Sato	No contest (illegal knees)	Titan Fighting Championship 2	January 21, 2001	1	0:26	Tokyo, Japan	
Draw	0–0–1	Masakazu Imanari	Technical Draw	Titan Fighting Championship 1	September 29, 2000	1	1:29	Tokyo, Japan	
