= All Asia Heavyweight Championship =

Professional wrestling championship

Details
- Promotion: JWA; AJPW; Land's End
- Date established: November 22, 1955
- Current champion: Dylan James
- Date won: March 9, 2025

Other names
- Pacific Wrestling Federation (PWF) All Asia Heavyweight Championship; Asia Heavyweight Championship
Statistics
- First champion: Rikidōzan
- Longest reign: Kintarō Ōki (fourth reign, 5,023 days)
- Shortest reign: Bill Dromo (first reign, 18 days)

The All Asia Heavyweight Championship (Japanese: オールアジアヘビー級王座, Hepburn: Ōru Ajia Hebī-kyū Ōza) is a title owned and promoted by the Pro Wrestling Land's End promotion. The title was originally created in 1955 in Japan Wrestling Association (JWA), with the inaugural champion crowned on November 22, 1955. Being a professional wrestling championship, the title is won as a result of a match with a predetermined outcome. The current champion is Dylan James, who is in his first reign.

== History ==
This title was contested for originally in JWA where it was known as the Pacific Wrestling Federation (PWF) All Asia Heavyweight Championship or All Asia Heavyweight Championship for short. When JWA shut down in 1973, the title went inactive until being reactivated in All Japan Pro Wrestling (AJPW) in 1976 after New Japan Pro-Wrestling (NJPW) announced the creation of its own version of the title. The NJPW title was retired in 1981, while the AJPW title was retired in 1995, following the retirement of final champion Kintarō Ōki.

On December 15, 2017, the Pro Wrestling Land's End promotion announced that it had gotten the blessing of Pacific Wrestling Federation chairman Dory Funk Jr. and Mitsuo Momota, the son of inaugural champion Rikidōzan, to revive the Asia Heavyweight Championship with a tournament to crown the new champion set to take place in South Korea on January 21, 2018. This also led to a new name and a new design of the championship. The tournament was won by Ryoji Sai who defeated Bodyguard in the finals of an eight-man tournament.

=== Inaugural championship tournament (1955) ===
Final standings
Rikidōzan	4.0
King Kong Czaya	2.5
Dara Singh	2.5
Tiger Joginder Singh	1.0
Syed Saif Shah	0.0

	Dara	Czaya	Shah	Tiger	Rikidōzan
Dara S.	—N/a	Draw	Dara S	Dara S	Rikidōzan
Czaya	Draw	—N/a	Czaya	Czaya	Bye (Note: King Kong Czaya and Rikidōzan received a bye into the finals.)
Shah	Dara S	Czaya	—N/a	Tiger J	Rikidōzan
Tiger J.	Dara S	Czaya	Tiger J	—N/a	Rikidōzan
Rikidōzan	Rikidōzan	Bye	Rikidōzan	Rikidōzan	—N/a

Final
1	Rikidōzan	KO
2	King Kong Czaya	90:50

=== Championship revival tournament (2018) ===
First round (January 21)
Bodyguard	Pin
Dr. MONZ Jr.	6:45
Yun Boy-ik	Pin
Dolgorsuren Beringon	04:24
Uncle	Pin
Masashi Takeda	7:53
Ryoji Sai	Pin
Che Yon	9:53

Semifinals (January 21)
Bodyguard	Sub
Dolgorsuren Beringon	0:59
Masashi Takeda	KO
Ryoji Sai	13:20

Final (January 21)
Bodyguard	Pin
Ryoji Sai	19:23

== Reigns ==
Key
No.	Overall reign number
Reign	Reign number for the specific champion
Days	Number of days held
+	Current reign is changing daily

No.	Champion	Championship change			Reign statistics		Notes	Ref.
No.	Champion	Date	Event	Location	Reign	Days	Notes	Ref.
Japan Pro Wrestling Alliance (JPWA)
1	Rikidōzan	November 22, 1955	House show	Tokyo, Japan	1	2,945	Defeated King Kong Czaya in a tournament final to become the inaugural champion.	
—	Vacated	December 15, 1963	—	—	—	—	Title vacated when Rikidōzan died.	
2	Kintarō Ōki	November 9, 1968	House show	Seoul, South Korea	1	797	Defeated Buddy Austin to win the vacant title.	
3	Bill Dromo	January 15, 1971	House show	Tokuyama, Japan	1	18		
4	Kintarō Ōki	February 2, 1971	House show	Hiroshima, Japan	2	2,061	The title became inactive on April 14, 1973, when the JWA closed, and was reactivated on March 26, 1976, after New Japan Pro-Wrestling announced the creation of its own version of the title.	
—	Vacated	September 24, 1976	—	—	—	—	Title held up after match against Waldo Von Erich in Omiya, Japan.	
All Japan Pro Wrestling (AJPW)
5	Kintarō Ōki	October 21, 1976	House show	Fukushima, Japan	3	373	Defeated Waldo Von Erich in a rematch to win the held up title.	
6	Giant Baba	October 29, 1977	House show	Kuroiso, Japan	1	1,251	Already held the PWF Heavyweight Championship, so both titles may have been defended simultaneously, or not at all.	
—	Vacated	April 13, 1981	—	—	—	—	Championship vacated for undocumented reasons. The NJPW version of the title is retired on May 21, 1981.	
South Korea
7	Kintarō Ōki	May 5, 1981	House show	South Korea	4	5,023	While not being defended for nearly a decade the championship was not officially retired until Ohki officially retired.	
—	Deactivated	February 4, 1995	—	—	—	—	Title abandoned.	
Pro Wrestling Land's End
8	Ryoji Sai	January 21, 2018	World Asia Heavyweight Championship One Day Tournament in Seoul	Seoul, South Korea	1	189	Defeated Bodyguard in a tournament final to win the vacant title.	
9	Bodyguard	July 29, 2018	Summer Action Series 2018	Osaka, Japan	1	182	This was an All Japan Pro Wrestling event.	
10	Kim Nam-seok	January 27, 2019	House show	Seoul, South Korea	1	467		
—	Vacated	May 8, 2023	—	—	—	—	Title vacated because Kim was not able to enter Japan to defend the title due to the COVID-19 pandemic.	
11	So Daimonji	June 6, 2023	Yokohama Fukushimania	Yokohama, Japan	1	642	Defeated Dylan James to win the vacant title.	
12	Dylan James	March 9, 2025	Land's End	Akō, Japan	1	316+		

== Combined reigns ==
As of January 19, 2026.

†	Indicates the current champion

Rank	Wrestler	No. of reigns	Combined days
1	Kintarō Ōki	4	8,254
2	Rikidōzan	1	2,945
3	Giant Baba	1	1,251
4	So Daimonji	1	642
5	Kim Nam-seok	1	467
6	Ryoji Sai	1	189
7	Bodyguard	1	182
8	Dylan James †	1	316+
9	Bill Dromo	1	18

== See also ==
- All Japan Pro Wrestling
- Japan Wrestling Association
- All Asia Tag Team Championship
- IWGP Intercontinental Championship
- IWGP United States Championship
- PWF Gaora Television Heavyweight Championship
- GHC National Championship
- United National Heavyweight Championship (Zero1)
