= Kohei Sato =

Japanese professional wrestler (born 1977)

Kohei Sato 佐藤耕平
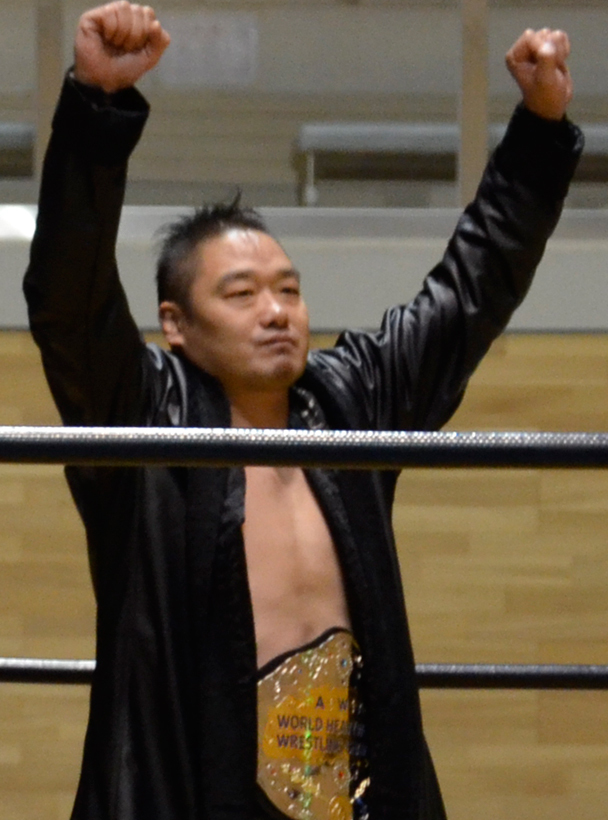
- Sato in June 2016

Personal information
- Born: September 21, 1977 (age 49) Tokyo, Japan

Professional wrestling career
- Ring name(s): Kohei Sato; Monster K
- Billed height: 1.93 m (6 ft 4 in)
- Billed weight: 100 kg (220 lb)
- Trained by: Inoki Dojo; Shinya Hashimoto
- Debut: June 14, 2001

Kohei Sato (佐藤 耕平, Satō Kōhei; born September 21, 1977) is a Japanese professional wrestler. He is currently contracted with Pro Wrestling Zero1. He also makes appearances on the Japanese independent circuit. Sato is also a former mixed martial artist.

== Career ==
A former judoka and amateur wrestler, Sato made his transition to mixed martial arts after meeting Kazunari Murakami and Sanshu Tsubakichi. He joined the Shooto promotion, winning the 1998 All Japan Amateur Shooto Championships over Takashi Okada in the heavyweight class, and later turning professional and gaining two wins over Anthony Netzler and Katsuhisa Fujii. He then retired from MMA in order to start in professional wrestling, debuting in Pro Wrestling ZERO-ONE in 2001.

== Championships and accomplishments ==
- Active Advance Pro Wrestling

- 2AW Openweight Championship (1 time)

- All Japan Pro Wrestling

- All Asia Tag Team Championship (1 time) – with Hirotaka Yokoi
- World Tag Team Championship (1 time) – with Shuji Ishikawa
- All Asia Tag Team Title League (2003) – with Hirotaka Yokoi

- Big Japan Pro Wrestling

- BJW World Strong Heavyweight Championship (1 time)
- BJW Tag Team Championship (3 times) – with Daisuke Sekimoto (1), and Shuji Ishikawa (2)
- Yokohama Shopping Street 6-Man Tag Team Championship (1 time) – with Daisuke Sekimoto and Hideyoshi Kamitani

- Pro Wrestling Illustrated

- PWI ranked him #150 of the top 500 singles wrestlers in the PWI 500 in 2016

- Pro Wrestling Zero1

- World Heavyweight Championship (6 times)
- ZERO1-MAX United States Openweight Championship (1 time)
- NWA United National Heavyweight Championship (1 time)
- NWA Intercontinental Tag Team Championship (7 times) – with Ryoji Sai (2), Yoshihiro Takayama (1), Kamikaze (2), Daisuke Sekimoto (1), and Hideki Suzuki (1)
- Fire Festival (2004, 2015)
- Furinkazan (2010) – with Kamikaze
- Furinkazan (2018) – with Sugi
- Passion Cup Tag Tournament (2008) – with Ryoji Sai
- Five-Man Tag Team Tournament (2015) – with Yusaku Obata, Masato Tanaka, Shinjiro Otani and Hideki Suzuki

- Tenryu Project

- Tenryu Project United National Heavyweight Tag Team Championship (1 time) – with Masayuki Kono
- Tenryu Project World 6-Man Tag Team Championship (2 times, current) – with Kenichiro Arai and Masayuki Kono (1) and Satsuki Nagao and Takuro Niki (1)

- World Entertainment Wrestling

- WEW World Tag Team Championship (1 time) – with Kamikaze

== Mixed martial arts record ==
Professional record breakdown
2 matches	2 wins	0 losses
By knockout	1	0
By submission	0	0
By decision	1	0
By disqualification	0	0

Res.	Record	Opponent	Method	Event	Date	Round	Time	Location	Notes
Win	2–0	Katsuhisa Fujii	TKO (punches)	Shooto - Renaxis 2	July 16, 1999	1	4:05	Tokyo, Japan	
Win	1–0	Anthony Netzler	Decision (unanimous)	Shooto - Renaxis 1	March 28, 1999	2	5:00	Tokyo, Japan	
