= Pro Wrestling Land's End =

Japanese professional wrestling promotion

Land's End Pro-Wrestling
- Founded: January 2016
- Style: King's Road style
- Headquarters: Japan
- Founder: Ryoji Sai
- Owner: Ryoji Sai
- Parent: Pacific Wrestling Federation
- Split from: Pro Wrestling Zero1
- Website: Official website

Land's End Pro-Wrestling (Japanese: ランズエンドプロレスリング, Hepburn: Ranzu Endo Puroresuringu; also known as Pro Wrestling Land's End) is a Japanese professional wrestling promotion established in 2016 by Ryoji Sai.

== History ==
In January 2016, Ryoji Sai left Pro Wrestling Zero1 to launch a new promotion named Land's End. The promotion held its first event on March 31.

On December 15, 2017, the Land's End Pro-Wrestling promotion announced that it had gotten the blessing of Pacific Wrestling Federation chairman Dory Funk Jr. and Mitsuo Momota, the son of inaugural champion Rikidōzan, to revive the All Asia Heavyweight Championship with a tournament to crown the new champion set to take place in South Korea on January 21, 2018. This also led to a new name and a new design of the championship. The tournament was won by Ryoji Sai who defeated Bodyguard in the finals of an eight-man tournament.

== Roster ==
Ring name	Real name	Notes
FG Mask	Undisclosed	
Futoshi Kyoboku	Matthew Pintor Wilson	
Ishikiri	Keito Takahashi	
Revlon	Unknown	
Ryo	Choe Yeong	
Ryoji Sai	Ryoji Sai	Founder; President
Shinsuke Jet Wakataka	Shinsuke Sumitani	
So Daimonji	Unknown	All Asia Heavyweight Champion
Uexile	Yusuke Ueda	

=== Staff ===
Name	Role
Natsuki☆Taiyo	Referee; Managing director
Sota Rokko	Referee
Versailles Handa	Ring announcer

== Championships ==
Championship	Current champion(s)	Reign	Date won	Days held	Notes	Ref
All Asia Heavyweight Championship	So Daimonji	1	June 6, 2023	1,247+	Defeated Dylan James at Yokohama Fukushimania to win the vacant title.	

== See also ==
- Professional wrestling in Japan
- List of professional wrestling promotions in Japan
