= Masato Tanaka =

Japanese wrestler (born 1973)

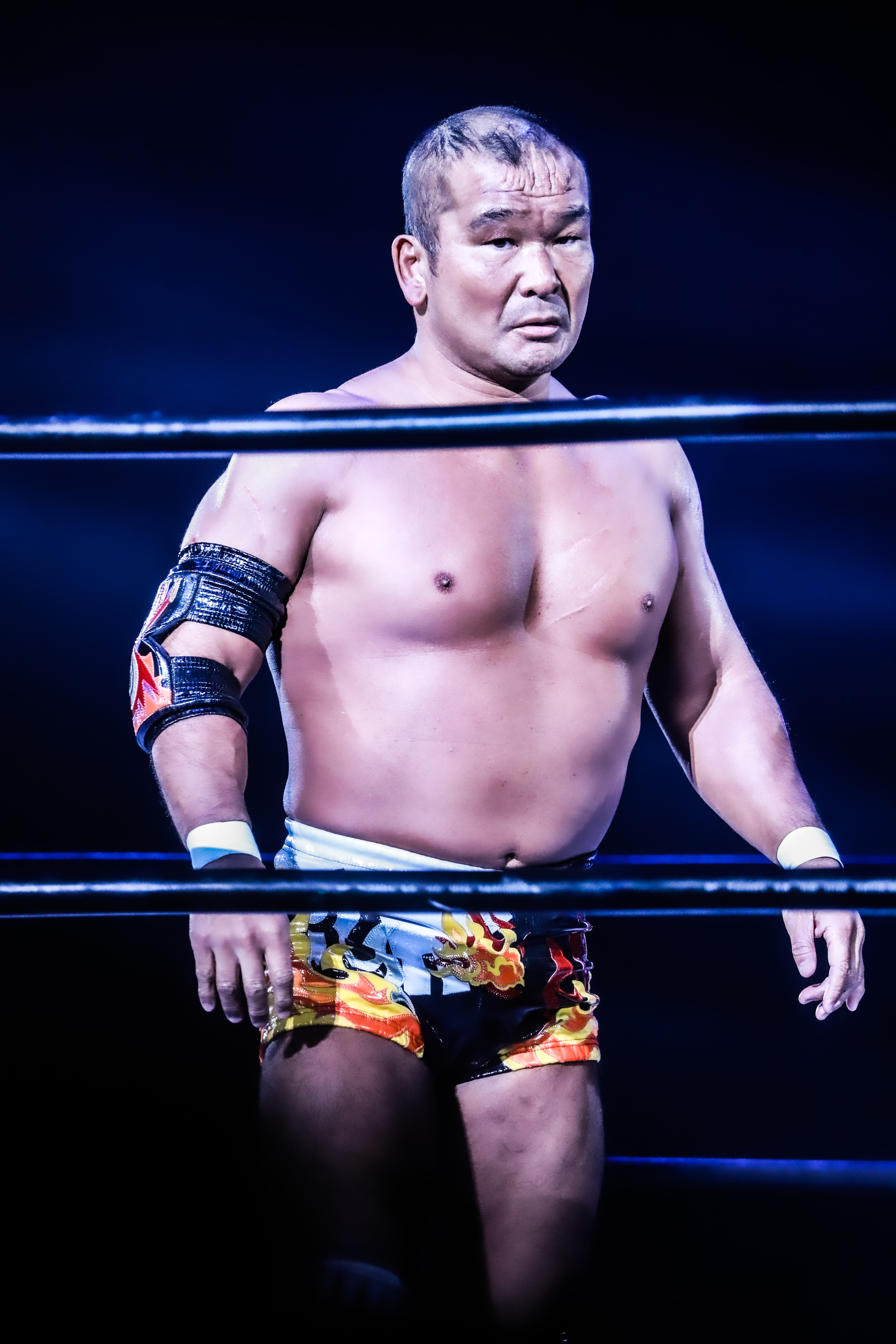
- Tanaka in 2022

Personal information
- Born: February 28, 1973 (age 53) Wakayama, Wakayama, Japan

Professional wrestling career
- Ring name(s): Masa Tanaka; Masato Tanaka; SWORD
- Billed height: 1.81 m (5 ft 11 in)
- Billed weight: 95 kg (209 lb)
- Billed from: Tokyo
- Trained by: Atsushi Onita
- Debut: July 23, 1993

Masato Tanaka (田中 正人, ring name: 田中 将斗, Tanaka Masato; born February 28, 1973) is a Japanese professional wrestler, He is currently working for both promotions Pro Wrestling Noah (Noah) and Pro Wrestling Zero1 (Zero1). He is best known for his appearances with Frontier Martial-Arts Wrestling (FMW) in Japan where he was a one-time FMW Brass Knuckles Heavyweight Champion and a one-time WEW World Heavyweight Champion and in Extreme Championship Wrestling (ECW) in the United States where he was a one-time ECW World Heavyweight Champion. He is overall a ten-time world champion in major professional wrestling promotions.

== Professional wrestling career ==
=== Frontier Martial-Arts Wrestling (1993–1997) ===
Originally a trainee for George and Shunji Takano's Pro Wrestling Crusaders (PWC), Tanaka transferred to Frontier Martial-Arts Wrestling (FMW), where he trained under Atsushi Onita. Tanaka debuted on July 23, 1993, in Saga City, facing Ricky Fuji. He quickly began moving up the card in FMW, widely regarded as the top hardcore professional wrestling promotion in Japan. Wrestling in matches featuring explosions and barbed wire, Tanaka earned a variety of scars, and the nickname "Dangan", which he would often shout during his matches. By 1996 he was one of the promotion's major stars, and had feuded with fellow wrestlers Mr. Pogo, Mr. Gannosuke, Terry Funk and Mike Awesome. His feud with Awesome would eventually span ten years and two continents. In December 1997, he left FMW for ECW, after he and Tetsuhiro Kuroda lost to H and Mr. Gannosuke.

=== Extreme Championship Wrestling (1998-2000) ===
==== Teaming with Balls Mahoney (1998) ====
Extreme Championship Wrestling (ECW) owner Paul Heyman became interested in Tanaka through ECW's working relationship with FMW, and eventually hired him. Tanaka debuted in ECW on March 1, 1998, at Living Dangerously, defeating Doug Furnas in a match that, compared to Tanaka's extremely well-received future matches, was very much hated by the fans in attendance, who greeted the unusually sloppy wrestlers with a chorus of boos throughout their fumbled offense. In July 1998 he reprised his feud with Awesome, who he defeated at Heat Wave 1998.

Tanaka formed a short-lived tag team with Balls Mahoney, and at November to Remember on November 1, 1998, they defeated The Dudley Boyz to win the ECW World Tag Team Championships. In doing so, he became the first person to ever kick out of the Dudleys' 3D finisher. The Dudley Boyz would regain the titles five days later, and Tanaka returned to Japan to attend the wedding of his friend Sabu in December and eventually returning to FMW in January 1999.

==== World Heavyweight Champion (1999–2000) ====
Tanaka returned to ECW in the summer of 1999, this time vying for the ECW World Heavyweight Championship. On September 19 at Anarchy Rulz, Taz, about to leave ECW for the World Wrestling Federation (WWF), defended the ECW World Heavyweight Championship against the returning Mike Awesome and Tanaka in a three-way dance. After just two minutes Taz was eliminated by a combined assault at the hands of his opponents. After a further eleven minutes of brawling, Awesome pinned Tanaka with a Kamikaze Awesome Bomb to become the new ECW World Heavyweight Champion.

Tanaka faced Awesome for the title at November to Remember on November 7, but was defeated once more. He finally overcame Awesome on December 17, 1999, at an ECW on TNN TV Taping in Nashville, Tennessee, becoming the first ECW World Heavyweight Champion not to be an American citizen. After the match, Awesome shook Tanaka's hand and fastened the belt around his waist in a show of respect, then attacked him as he left the ring and powerbombed him through a table. Awesome would regain the title at the next weeks TV Taping in White Plains, New York, on December 23.

Continuing his rivalry with Awesome, Tanaka joined forces with Tommy Dreamer to face Raven and Awesome. Dreamer and Tanaka defeated the Impact Players for the ECW World Tag Team Championship on February 26, 2000, in Cincinnati, but lost them to Mike Awesome and Raven on March 4, 2000, at The ECW Arena. This led to a tag team three-way dance at Living Dangerously on March 12, with Tanaka and Dreamer facing ECW World Tag Team Champions Mike Awesome and Raven and the Impact Players. Tanaka pinned Awesome, who had already defended his ECW World Heavyweight Title earlier that night beating Kid Kash, costing Awesome and Raven the tag team titles, but lost the match after Dreamer was pinned by the Impact Players.

Tanaka's feud with Awesome was brought to an abrupt end when Awesome left ECW for WCW in April 2000. He faced Balls Mahoney in at ECW on TNN and at Hardcore Heaven 2000. He remained with ECW until mid-2000 before returning to Japan.

=== Return to Japan (2000–present) ===
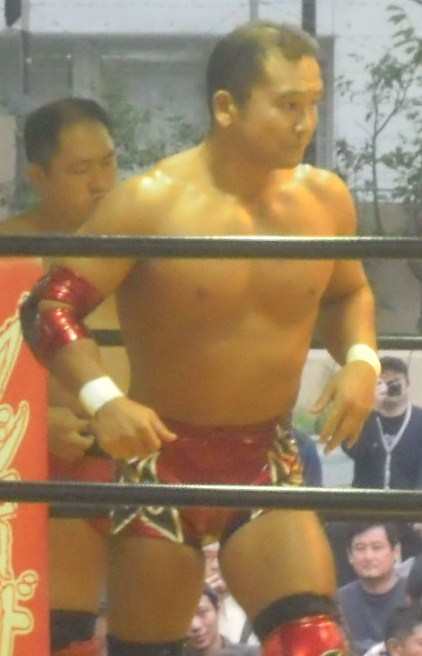
Tanaka in 2011

Tanaka returned to FMW in the spring of 2000, briefly feuding with H, before joining forces with H (by now back under the Hayabusa persona) to feud with Team No Respect, until leaving in February 2001, allegedly as a result of animosity between him and the owner of FMW, Shoichi Arai, mostly over Kodo Fuyuki's role as booker. Before departing FMW, Tanaka formed the "Complete Players" stable with former Fuyuki protégés Gedo and Jado, as well as real-life sweetheart Kaori Nakayama. They would work on the Japanese independent circuit, making appearances for Pro Wrestling ZERO-ONE (ZERO-ONE) and All Japan Pro Wrestling (AJPW). Tanaka wrestled Shinya Hashimoto on the March 2 ZERO-ONE anniversary show, impressing ZERO-ONE officials and earning himself a job.

In January 2002 Tanaka formed a tag team named "Emblem" with Shinjiro Otani, with whom he twice won the NWA Intercontinental Tag Team Championships. In February 2004, he turned heel and sided with the "Apache Army". In September 2004 he formed his own stable, "Team Erotics", continuing his feud with Otani. In late 2007, he was chosen to lead a new stable named "Sword Army", the name was chosen by fans in a contest. Takao Omori was also given a stable named "Axe Army" to compete against Tanaka.

In mid-2009 Tanaka returned to New Japan Pro-Wrestling (NJPW) as an outsider. He reformed the Complete Players with Jado and Gedo, and he participated in the 2009 G1 Climax tournament, although he failed to advance past the block stages. In New Japan, he's an ally of the stable, Chaos, especially Jado, Gedo and Yujiro Takahashi. On October 10, 2011, at Destruction '11, Tanaka defeated MVP to win the IWGP Intercontinental Championship, becoming only the second champion in the title's history. He would make his first successful title defense on November 12 at Power Struggle against Hirooki Goto. On December 4, Tanaka defeated MVP in a rematch, with help from Yujiro Takahashi, to retain the IWGP Intercontinental Championship. On January 4, 2012, at Wrestle Kingdom VI in Tokyo Dome, where Tanaka and Takahashi were defeated by MVP and Shelton Benjamin in a tag team match. On February 12 at The New Beginning, Tanaka lost the IWGP Intercontinental Championship to Hirooki Goto in his fourth defense.

On November 15, 2012, Tanaka entered a tournament to determine the inaugural NEVER Openweight Champion. After wins over Kushida, Taishi Takizawa and Tomohiro Ishii, Tanaka defeated Karl Anderson in the finals of the tournament on November 19 to become the inaugural NEVER Openweight Champion. Tanaka made his first successful title defense on January 4, 2013, at Wrestle Kingdom 7 in Tokyo Dome, where he defeated Shelton Benjamin. Tanaka's second successful title defense took place on February 3, when he defeated Chaos stablemate Tomohiro Ishii. On May 3 at Wrestling Dontaku 2013, Tanaka made his third successful title defense against Tomoaki Honma. On July 20, Tanaka made his fourth successful title defense against Tetsuya Naito. On September 29 at Destruction, Tanaka lost the NEVER Openweight Championship in a rematch with Naito, ending his reign at 314 days.

After forming the Dangan Yankies stable in Zero1, Tanaka began working for Pro Wrestling Noah (Noah) in early 2014, teaming with stablemate Takashi Sugiura. On April 27, the two defeated Katsuhiko Nakajima and Naomichi Marufuji to win the 2014 Global Tag League. On May 6, Tanaka and Sugiura won the NWA Intercontinental Tag Team Championship. On May 31, Tanaka and Sugiura became double champions, when they defeated Maybach Taniguchi and Takeshi Morishima for Noah's GHC Tag Team Championship. They lost the GHC Tag Team Championship to TMDK (Mikey Nicholls and Shane Haste) on January 10, 2015. On May 4, Tanaka and Sugiura won their second Global Tag League in a row.

In June 2017, he competed for the theater-based promotion MAKAI in the "iZANAGI" series, where he took up the ring name "SWORD". He faced Jun Kasai, who was under the ring name of X1112.

On January 1, 2021, Tanaka won his 5th Zero1 World Heavyweight Championship.

By late 2021, Tanaka was wrestling regularly for Pro Wrestling Noah. In 2022, Tanaka would begin to achieve significant success in the promotion. He challenged for the GHC Heavyweight Title against Kazuyuki Fujita and participated in the N1 Victory League singles tournament. In this round robin tournament, Tanaka pinned then-GHC Heavyweight Champion Kenoh among a star studded list of opponents.

=== Return to the United States (2002–present) ===
On November 9, 2002, Tanaka debuted for Ring of Honor (ROH), wrestling on ROH's All Star Extravaganza show, where he teamed with Shinjiro Otani to defeat Steve Corino and Low Ki.

On June 12. 2005 Tanaka revived his feud with Mike Awesome at the World Wrestling Entertainment (WWE) produced ECW One Night Stand 2005 reunion PPV. He was defeated after Awesome delivered a running Awesome Bomb through a table outside the ring and followed up with an Awesome Splash. He returned to WWE one year later at ECW One Night Stand 2006, losing to Balls Mahoney. On October 26, 2007, Tanaka beat Takao Omori for the AWA World Heavyweight Championship.

On January 23, 2010, Tanaka made his debut for Jersey All Pro Wrestling (JAPW) at the promotion's 12th Anniversary Show, where he was defeated by Homicide.

On April 4, 2014, Tanaka returned to the United States, he performed at his first WrestleCon defeating Kevin Steen. Later in the night he defeated Chris Hero at a Dragon Gate USA event.

In December 2018 Tanaka made another return to the United States. He would face PCO in a match for the Game Changer Wrestling Extreme Title at GCW's The Dynasty event.

On September 15–16, 2023, Tanaka competed in local Cleveland Promotion Absolute Intense Wrestlings 10th JT Lightning Invitational Tournament making it to the Semi-finals.

On November 12, 2023, Tanaka made his debut for Deadlock Pro-Wrestling (DPW), wrestling on DPW's World's Strongest event, where he teamed with Bryan Keith and Calvin Tankman to defeat Tom Lawlor, Jorel Nelson, and Royce Isaacs. He would return the next year at the promotion's No Pressure event where he was defeated by Colby Corino, son of his former rival Steve Corino, in a no disqualification match.

On January 9, 2024, Tanaka made his debut for Wrestling Revolver at the Vybe Check event in Dayton Ohio.

On October 13, 2024, Tanaka challenged pro wrestler Adam Priest for the DPW National Championship at DPW's Super Battle, but failed to take the title.On October 17 at Timebomb Pro Forever Masato wrestled Jordan for vacant Timebomb Title, but was unsuccessful. Later, on October 18, Tanaka faced Mike Santana in the House of Glory World Championship, with Santana pinning Tanaka to win the fight after 15 minutes.

== Championships and accomplishments ==
- DDT Pro-Wrestling
  - KO-D Openweight Championship (1 time)
  - D-Oh Grand Prix (2020)
- Extreme Championship Wrestling
  - ECW World Heavyweight Championship (1 time)
  - ECW World Tag Team Championship (2 times) – with Balls Mahoney (1) and Tommy Dreamer (1)
- Frontier Martial Arts Wrestling
  - FMW Brass Knuckles Heavyweight Championship (1 time)
  - FMW Brass Knuckles Tag Team Championship (2 times) – with Hayabusa (1) and Tetsuhiro Kuroda (1)
  - FMW Independent Heavyweight Championship (2 times)
  - FMW World Street Fight 6-Man Tag Team Championship (4 times) – with Hayabusa and Hisakatsu Ōya (1), Hayabusa and Kōji Nakagawa (1), Tetsuhiro Kuroda and Kōji Nakagawa (1), and Atsushi Onita and Hideki Hosaka (1)
  - WEW 6-Man Tag Team Championship (1 time) – with Gedo and Jado
  - WEW Heavyweight Championship (1 time)
  - WEW World Tag Team Championship (1 time) – with Gedō
  - Young Spirit Tournament (1995)
  - FMW Brass Knuckles Tag Team Championship Tournament (1999) – with Tetsuhiro Kuroda
- Greektown Pro Wrestling
  - Greektown Wrestling Championship (1 time)
- Guts World Pro Wrestling
  - GWC Tag Team Championship (1 time) – with Daisuke
  - GWC Tag Team Championship Tournament (2009) – with Daisuke
- Hustle
  - Hustle Hardcore Hero Championship (1 time)
  - Hustle King Memorial Six-Man Tag Tournament (2006) – with Tadao Yasuda and Shinjiro Otani
- New Horizon Pro Wrestling
  - NHPW Art of Fighting Championship (1 time, current)
- New Japan Pro-Wrestling
  - IWGP Intercontinental Championship (1 time)
  - NEVER Openweight Championship (1 time, inaugural)
  - NEVER Openweight Championship Tournament (2012)
  - New Japan Respect Ranbo (2025)
- Nikkan Sports
  - Best Tag Team Award (2014) with Takashi Sugiura
  - Technique Award (2011)
- Premier Wrestling Federation
  - PWF Universal Tag Team Championship (1 time) – with Shinjiro Otani
  - Match of the Year (2003, 2004)
  - PWF MVP (2004)
  - Most Popular Wrestler of the Year (2004)
- Pro Wrestling Expo
  - Continent Confrontation Tag Team League (2008) – with Daisuke Sekimoto
- Pro Wrestling Noah
  - GHC Tag Team Championship (1 time) – with Takashi Sugiura
  - GHC Openweight Hardcore Championship (2 times)
  - Global Tag League (2014, 2015) – with Takashi Sugiura
  - Global League Tournament Technique Award (2014)
- Pro Wrestling Illustrated
  - Ranked No. 21 of the top 500 singles wrestlers in the PWI 500 in 2000
  - Ranked No. 285 of the 500 singles wrestlers of the PWI Years in 2003
- Pro Wrestling World-1
  - World-1 Heavyweight Championship (1 time)
- Pro Wrestling Zero1
  - World Heavyweight Championship (7 times)
  - NWA United National Heavyweight Championship (1 time)^{1}
  - AWA World Heavyweight Championship (1 time)
  - NWA Intercontinental Tag Team Championship (8 times) – with Shinjiro Otani (2), Wataru Sakata (1), Zeus (1), Takashi Sugiura (1), James Raideen (1), Yuji Hino (1) and Takuya Sugawara (1)
  - Estasi Cup (2012) – with Paul Tracey and Ryouji Sai
  - Fire Festival (2006, 2008, 2012, 2017)
  - Furinkazan
    - (2011) – with Fujita Hayato
    - (2014) – with Takashi Sugiura
    - (2023) – with Yoshikazu Yokoyama
  - Tenkaichi Junior (2007)
  - Five-Man Tag Team Tournament (2015) – with Shinjiro Otani, Kohei Sato, Yusaku Obata and Hideki Suzuki
  - MVP (2007, 2008)
  - Best Bout (2008) vs. Manabu Nakanishi on April 6
  - Best Bout (2011) vs. Daisuke Sekimoto on August 7
- Chō Hanabi Puroresu
  - Bakuha-ō Tag Team Championship (1 time) – with Taru
- Super Fireworks Pro Wrestling
  - Blast King Championship (1 time)
  - Blast King Tag Team Championship (2 times, final) – with Taru (1), Hide Kubota (1)
- Tokyo Sports
  - Fighting Spirit Award (2008)
  - Best Newcomer Award (1995)
  - Best Tag Team Award (2014) – with Takashi Sugiura
- Wrestle-1
  - Wrestle-1 Tag Team Championship (1 time) – with Jiro Kuroshio

^{1}This title is not to be confused with the NWA United National Championship, an NWA singles title that has been integrated into and is now part of the Triple Crown Heavyweight Championship.
