= 2022 in professional wrestling =

2022 in professional wrestling describes the year's events in the world of professional wrestling.

Beginning in March 2020, the COVID-19 pandemic severely affected the professional wrestling industry worldwide, with many promotions presenting shows behind closed doors. Some events were canceled while others were rescheduled to occur in 2021 and then some in 2022. Larger companies such as All Elite Wrestling and WWE resumed live touring with full-capacity crowds in July 2021—further companies also began readmitting fans to events in 2022.

== List of notable promotions ==
These promotions held notable events throughout 2022.

Promotion Name	Abbreviation	Notes
All Elite Wrestling	AEW	
All Japan Pro Wrestling	AJPW	
CyberFight	CF	CyberFight is an umbrella brand that oversees and promotes four individual promotions: DDT Pro-Wrestling (DDT), Ganbare☆Pro-Wrestling (GanPro), Pro Wrestling Noah (NOAH), and Tokyo Joshi Pro Wrestling (TJPW).
Consejo Mundial de Lucha Libre	CMLL	
Big Japan Pro Wrestling	BJW	
DDT Pro-Wrestling	DDT	
Dragon Gate	—	
Game Changer Wrestling	GCW	
Impact Wrestling	Impact	
Jim Crockett Promotions	JCP	The assets of JCP had been purchased by Turner Broadcasting System in 1988 and rebranded as World Championship Wrestling. Over 33 years later, in May 2022, JCP was revived.
Lucha Libre AAA Worldwide	AAA	The "AAA" abbreviation has been used since the mid-1990s and had previously stood for the promotion's original name Asistencia Asesoría y Administración.
Major League Wrestling	MLW	
National Wrestling Alliance	NWA	
New Japan Pro-Wrestling	NJPW	
Pro Wrestling Guerrilla	PWG	
Pro Wrestling Noah	Noah	
Pro Wrestling Zero1	Zero1	
Ring of Honor	ROH	Acquired by AEW President and Chief Executive Officer Tony Khan on March 2.
World Wonder Ring Stardom	Stardom	
WWE	—	"WWE" stands for World Wrestling Entertainment, which remains the company's legal name, though the company ceased using the full name in April 2011, with the WWE abbreviation becoming an orphaned initialism. WWE divided its roster into four storyline divisions – referred to as brands where wrestlers exclusively performed on their respective weekly television programs. Raw and SmackDown were their two main brands, while NXT served as a developmenal territory. NXT UK was a specialty brand promoted under the NXT banner, but was discontinued after September, with plans to eventually reboot the brand as NXT Europe. 205 Live was another specialty brand under NXT that was dissolved in February.
Xtreme Pro Wrestling	XPW	

== Calendar of notable shows ==
=== January ===
Date	Promotion(s)	Event	Location	Main Event	Notes
1	CF: Noah	Noah The New Year 2022	Tokyo, Japan	Katsuhiko Nakajima (c) defeated Go Shiozaki to retain the GHC Heavyweight Championship	
1	WWE: Raw; SmackDown	Day 1	Atlanta, Georgia	Brock Lesnar defeated Big E (c), Seth Rollins, Kevin Owens, and Bobby Lashley in a fatal five-way match to win the WWE Championship	WWE's first PPV to take place on New Year's Day.
1	CMLL	Sin Salida	Mexico City, Mexico	Dulce Gardenia defeated Disturbio in a Lucha de Apuestas elimination masks vs. hair steel cage match	
4	WWE: NXT	New Year's Evil	Orlando, Florida	Bron Breakker defeated Tommaso Ciampa (c) to win the NXT Championship	Aired as a special episode of NXT 2.0. Final event to feature the NXT Cruiserweight Championship.
4	NJPW	Wrestle Kingdom 16	Tokyo, Japan	Kazuchika Okada defeated Shingo Takagi (c) to win the IWGP World Heavyweight Championship	First Wrestle Kingdom to be held on three nights as well as the first in which one night was not held at the Tokyo Dome.
5	NJPW	Wrestle Kingdom 16	Tokyo, Japan	Kazuchika Okada (c) defeated Will Ospreay to retain the IWGP World Heavyweight Championship	First Wrestle Kingdom to be held on three nights as well as the first in which one night was not held at the Tokyo Dome.
8	NJPW; CF: NOAH	Wrestle Kingdom 16	Yokohama, Japan	Kazuchika Okada and Hiroshi Tanahashi defeated Keiji Mutoh and Kaito Kiyomiya	First Wrestle Kingdom to be held on three nights as well as the first in which one night was not held at the Tokyo Dome.
4	CF: Noah	Reboot 2022	Tokyo, Japan	Stinger (Hayata and Yoshinari Ogawa) (c) defeated Los Perros del Mal de Japón (Kotaro Suzuki and Yo-Hey) to retain the GHC Junior Heavyweight Tag Team Championship	
5	CF: Noah	New Sunrise 2022	Tokyo, Japan	Daiki Inaba, Go Shiozaki, Kaito Kiyomiya, Masa Kitamiya and Yoshiki Inamura defeated M's Alliance (Keiji Muto, Masato Tanaka and Naomichi Marufuji) and Sugiura-gun (Kazuyuki Fujita and Takashi Sugiura)	
8	AEW	Battle of the Belts I	Charlotte, North Carolina	Dr. Britt Baker, D.M.D. (c) defeated Riho to retain the AEW Women's World Championship	The first episode in AEW's quarterly Battle of the Belts television special series on TNT.
8	Impact	Hard To Kill	Dallas, Texas	Mickie James (c) defeated Deonna Purrazzo in a Texas Deathmatch to retain the Impact Knockouts World Championship	
8	NWA	Duuuval Brawl	Jacksonville, Florida	Trevor Murdoch (c) defeated Gangrel to retain the NWA Worlds Heavyweight Championship	
14	GCW	Most Notorious	Detroit, Michigan	Alex Colon (c) defeated Hoodfoot to retain the GCW Ultraviolent Championship	GCW's debut in the Harpos Theatre.
15	NJPW	The New Beginning USA	Seattle, Washington	Jay White defeated Jay Lethal	
16	CF: Noah	Bumper Crop 2022 In Sendai	Sendai, Japan	Katsuhiko Nakajima (c) defeated Masa Kitamiya to retain the GHC Heavyweight Championship	
21	MLW	Blood & Thunder	Dallas, Texas	Jacob Fatu defeated Mads Krügger	
22	CF: Noah	Noah Higher Ground 2022	Osaka, Japan	Masakatsu Funaki defeated Kenoh (c) to win the GHC National Championship	
23	GCW	The Wrld on GCW	New York, New York	Matt Tremont and Nick Gage defeated The Briscoe Brothers (Jay Briscoe and Mark Briscoe) (c) in a Tag team open challenge to win the GCW Tag Team Championship	GCW's debut in the Hammerstein Ballroom and the first wrestling event in the venue since 2019.
26	AEW	Beach Break	Cleveland, Ohio	Orange Cassidy defeated Adam Cole in an Unsanctioned Lights Out match	Aired live as a special episode of Dynamite. Featured Cody Rhodes' final match in AEW.
26	AEW	Beach Break	Cleveland, Ohio	Jurassic Express (Jungle Boy and Luchasaurus) (c) defeated Private Party (Isiah Kassidy and Marq Quen) to retain the AEW World Tag Team Championship	Aired on tape delay on January 28 as a special episode of Rampage.
28	CMLL	Reyes del Aire	Mexico City, Mexico	Místico defeated Último Guerrero	
29	WWE: Raw; SmackDown	Royal Rumble	St. Louis, Missouri	Brock Lesnar won the 30-man Royal Rumble match by last eliminating Drew McIntyre to earn a world championship match at WrestleMania 38	The event notably saw the return of Ronda Rousey, who won the women's Royal Rumble match to earn a women's championship match at WrestleMania 38. Lesnar chose to challenge Roman Reigns for SmackDown's Universal Championship while Rousey chose to challenge Charlotte Flair for the SmackDown Women's Championship.
29	Stardom	Nagoya Supreme Fight	Nagoya, Japan	Syuri (c) defeated Mirai to retain the World of Stardom Championship	
29	PWG	Battle of Los Angeles	Los Angeles, California	Daniel Garcia defeated Mike Bailey to win the 2022 Battle of Los Angeles	
30	PWG	Battle of Los Angeles	Los Angeles, California	Daniel Garcia defeated Mike Bailey to win the 2022 Battle of Los Angeles	
(c) – denotes defending champion(s)

=== February ===
Date	Promotion(s)	Event	Location	Main Event	Notes
11	NJPW	New Years Golden Series in Sendai	Sendai, Japan	El Desperado (c) defeated Master Wato to retain the IWGP Junior Heavyweight Championship	
12	NWA	PowerrrTrip	Oak Grove, Kentucky	Matt Cardona defeated Trevor Murdoch (c) to win the NWA Worlds Heavyweight Championship	
13	NJPW	New Years Golden Series in Osaka	Osaka, Japan	Los Ingobernables de Japón (Tetsuya Naito and Sanada) defeated Kazuchika Okada and Hiroshi Tanahashi	
15	WWE: NXT	Vengeance Day	Orlando, Florida	Bron Breakker (c) defeated Santos Escobar to retain the NXT Championship	Aired as a special episode of NXT 2.0. First Vengeance to air as a television special.
17	NJPW	Rivals	Los Angeles, California	Jay White defeated Shane Strickland	
19	WWE: Raw; SmackDown	Elimination Chamber	Jeddah, Saudi Arabia	Brock Lesnar defeated Bobby Lashley (c), AJ Styles, Austin Theory, Riddle, and Seth "Freakin" Rollins in an Elimination Chamber match to win the WWE Championship	First Elimination Chamber held in Saudi Arabia, as well as the first held outside the United States and on a Saturday.
19	Impact	No Surrender	Westwego, Louisiana	Honor No More (Matt Taven, Mike Bennett, PCO, Vincent, and Kenny King) defeated Team Impact (Chris Sabin, Willie Mack, Rhino, Rich Swann, and Steve Maclin)	
19	AAA	Rey de Reyes	Veracruz, Veracruz	Hijo del Vikingo (c) defeated Johnny Superstar to retain the AAA Mega Championship	
19	NJPW	New Years Golden Series in Sapporo	Sapporo, Japan	Sanada defeated Hiroshi Tanahashi (c) to win the IWGP United States Heavyweight Championship	
20	NJPW	New Years Golden Series in Sapporo	Sapporo, Japan	Kazuchika Okada (c) defeated Tetsuya Naito to retain the IWGP World Heavyweight Championship	
23	CF: Noah	Gain Control 2022 In Nagoya	Nagoya, Japan	Kazuyuki Fujita defeated Katsuhiko Nakajima (c) to win the GHC Heavyweight Championship	
23	Stardom	Cinderella Journey	Nagaoka, Japan	Saya Kamitani (c) defeated Natsupoi to retain the Wonder of Stardom Championship	
25	CMLL	Torneo Increible De Parejas	Mexico City, Mexico	Atlantis Jr. and Stuka Jr. defeated Averno and Mistico to win 2022 Torneo Increible De Parejas.	
26	CMLL; NJPW	NJPW X CMLL	Tijuana, Baja California, Mexico	Mistico, Negro Casas and Templario defeated Atlantis, Rey Bucanero and Ultimo Guerrero	
26	MLW	SuperFight	Charlotte, North Carolina	The Von Erichs (Marshall von Erich and Ross von Erich) defeated The Mortons (Kerry Morton and Ricky Morton)	
(c) – denotes defending champion(s)

=== March ===
Date	Promotion(s)	Event	Location	Main Event	Notes
1	NJPW	NJPW 50th Anniversary Show	Tokyo, Japan	Kazuchika Okada, Hiroshi Tanahashi, and Tatsumi Fujinami defeated Suzuki-gun (Minoru Suzuki and Zack Sabre Jr.) and Yoshiaki Fujiwara	
4	CMLL	Mexican National Heavyweight Championship Tournament	Mexico City, Mexico	Euforia defeated Gran Guerrero to win the vacant Mexican National Heavyweight Championship.	
5	Impact	Sacrifice	Louisville, Kentucky	Moose (c) defeated Heath to retain the Impact World Championship	
6	AEW	Revolution	Orlando, Florida	"Hangman" Adam Page (c) defeated Adam Cole to retain the AEW World Championship	
8	WWE: NXT	Roadblock	Orlando, Florida	Dolph Ziggler defeated Tommaso Ciampa and Bron Breakker (c) in a triple threat match to win the NXT Championship	Aired as a special episode of NXT 2.0. First Roadblock since December 2016 and the first held as a television special.
11	Stardom	New Blood 1	Tokyo, Japan	Utami Hayashishita defeated Miyu Amasaki	
12	GCW	Astronaut	Atlanta, Georgia	The H8 Club (Matt Tremont and Nick Gage) (c) vs. The Second Gear Crew (Mance Warner and Matthew Justice) for the GCW Tag Team Championship ended in a double pin.	GCW's debut in Center Stage.
15	CMLL	CMLL World Lightweight Championship Tournament	Mexico City, Mexico	Star Jr., Titan and Volador Jr. defeated Los Malditos (El Sagrado, Gemelo Diablo I and Gemelo Diablo II)	
16	AEW	St. Patrick's Day Slam	San Antonio, Texas	Thunder Rosa defeated Dr. Britt Baker D.M.D. (c) in a Steel Cage match to win the AEW Women's World Championship	Aired as a special episode of Dynamite.
18	CMLL	Homenaje a Dos Leyendas (Night 1)	Mexico City, Mexico	Místico and Averno defeated TJP and Volador Jr.	
19	NWA	Crockett Cup	Nashville, Tennessee	The Commonwealth Connection (Doug Williams and Harry Smith) defeated Gold Rushhh (Jordan Clearwater and Marshe Rockett) by submission in a Crockett Cup quarterfinals tag team match	
20	NWA	Crockett Cup	Nashville, Tennessee	Matt Cardona (c) defeated Nick Aldis by disqualification to retain the NWA Worlds Heavyweight Championship	
20	NJPW	Strong Style Evolved	Tampa, Florida	Jay White defeated Chris Sabin	
20	CF: DDT	Judgement 2022: DDT 25th Anniversary	Tokyo, Japan	Tetsuya Endo defeated Konosuke Takeshita (c) to win the KO-D Openweight Championship	
21	CF: Noah	Great Voyage in Fukuoka 2022	Fukuoka, Japan	Kazuyuki Fujita (c) defeated Masato Tanaka to retain the GHC Heavyweight Championship	
21	CMLL	Homenaje a Dos Leyendas (Night 2)	Puebla, Mexico	Mistico defeats Gran Guerrero	
21	AJPW	AJPW Champions Night 3: 50th Anniversary Tour	Tokyo, Japan	Kento Miyahara (c) defeated Shuji Ishikawa to retain the Triple Crown Heavyweight Championship	
22	CMLL	Homenaje a Dos Leyendas (Night 3)	Guadalajara, Mexico	Averno and Black Warrior defeated Mistico and Titan	
26	Stardom	World Climax 2022	Tokyo, Japan	Syuri (c) defeated Giulia to retain the World of Stardom Championship	
27	Stardom	World Climax 2022	Tokyo, Japan	Syuri (c) defeated Mayu Iwatani to retain the World of Stardom Championship	
27	NJPW	New Japan Cup (Finals)	Osaka, Japan	Zack Sabre Jr. defeated Tetsuya Naito to win the 2022 New Japan Cup	
31	MLW	Intimidation Games	Dallas, Texas	The Von Erichs (Marshall Von Erich and Ross Von Erich) defeated 5150 (Danny Rivera and Hernandez) in a Bunkhouse Brawl	
31	AAA	AAA Invades WrestleCon	Dallas, Texas	Psycho Clown defeated Black Taurus	
31	WrestleCon	Mark Hitchcock Memorial SuperShow	Dallas, Texas	The Briscoe Brothers (Jay Briscoe and Mark Briscoe) defeated The Rottweilers (Homicide and Low Ki)	
31	GCW	Bloodsport 8	Dallas, Texas	Chris Dickinson defeated Minoru Suzuki	
31	GCW	Joey Janela's Spring Break 6 Part 1	Dallas, Texas	John Wayne Murdoch defeated Alex Colon to win the GCW Ultraviolent Championship	
(c) – denotes defending champion(s)

=== April ===
Date	Promotion(s)	Event	Location	Main Event	Notes
1	ROH	Supercard of Honor XV	Garland, Texas	Jonathan Gresham (c) defeated Bandido in a Winner Takes All match to determine the undisputed ROH World Champion	ROH's first live event since their hiatus in 2021.
1	NJPW	Lonestar Shootout	Dallas, Texas	Tomohiro Ishii defeated Chris Dickinson	
1	Impact	Multiverse of Matches	Dallas, Texas	The Good Brothers (Doc Gallows and Karl Anderson) defeated The Briscoe Brothers (Jay Briscoe and Mark Briscoe)	
1	MLW	Azteca Underground	Dallas, Texas	Jacob Fatu defeated Bestia 666 in an Azteca Apocalypto match	
1	GCW	Joey Janela's Spring Break 6 Part 2	Dallas, Texas	The Second Gear Crew (AJ Gray, Mance Warner and Matthew Justice) won the 54-person Clusterfuck battle royal	
2	WrestleCon	USA vs. The World	Dallas, Texas	Michael Oku (c) defeated Rich Swann to retain the RevPro Undisputed British Cruiserweight Championship	
2	WWE: NXT	Stand & Deliver	Dallas, Texas	Dolph Ziggler (c) defeated Bron Breakker to retain the NXT Championship	Aired midday before WrestleMania 38 Night 1.
2	CMLL	79. Aniversario Arena Coliseo	Mexico City, Mexico	Dragon Rojo Jr. defeated El Soberano Jr. (c) to win the CMLL World Middleweight Championship	
2	WWE: Raw; SmackDown	WrestleMania 38	Arlington, Texas	"Stone Cold" Steve Austin defeated Kevin Owens in a No Holds Barred match	This was Austin's first match in 19 years. Also featured Cody Rhodes' return to WWE after six years.
3	WWE: Raw; SmackDown	WrestleMania 38	Arlington, Texas	Roman Reigns (WWE Universal Champion) defeated Brock Lesnar (WWE Champion) in a Winner Takes All match to become the Undisputed WWE Universal Champion	Featured Vince McMahon's first match in 10 years.
9	NJPW	Hyper Battle	Tokyo, Japan	Kazuchika Okada (c) defeated Zack Sabre Jr. to retain the IWGP World Heavyweight Championship	
10	Zero1; AJPW; NJPW; CF: NOAH	Zero1 20th Anniversary from Ryogoku Kokugikan	Tokyo, Japan	Takashi Sugiura (c) defeated Shinjiro Otani to retain the Zero1 World Heavyweight Championship	
15	AEW	Battle of the Belts II	Garland, Texas	Thunder Rosa (c) defeated Nyla Rose to retain the AEW Women's World Championship	Aired on tape delay on April 16.
16	AJPW; NJPW	Korakuen Hall's 60th Anniversary Show	Tokyo, Japan	Kento Miyahara and Hiroshi Tanahashi vs. Jake Lee and Taichi ended in a time limit draw.	
16	NJPW	Windy City Riot	Villa Park, Illinois	Jon Moxley defeated Will Ospreay	
23	Impact	Rebellion	Poughkeepsie, New York	Josh Alexander defeated Moose (c) to win the Impact World Championship	
29	Stardom	Stardom Cinderella Tournament 2022 (Night 4)	Yokohama, Japan	Syuri (c) defeated Himeka to retain the World of Stardom Championship	
29	CMLL	66. Aniversario de Arena México	Mexico City, Mexico	Místico defeated Titán to win the CMLL Universal Championship	
29	CF: Noah	Noah Majestic 2022	Tokyo, Japan	Go Shiozaki defeated Kaito Kiyomiya to win the vacant GHC Heavyweight Championship	
30	AAA	Triplemanía XXX: Monterrey	Monterrey, Mexico	The Young Bucks (Matt Jackson and Nick Jackson) defeated Hijo del Vikingo and Fenix	First of three Triplemanía events to be held by AAA in 2022.
30	NWA	PowerrrTrip 2	Oak Grove, Kentucky	KiLynn King and Missa Kate defeated Kamille and Kenzie Paige	
(c) – denotes defending champion(s)

=== May ===
Date	Promotion(s)	Event	Location	Main Event	Notes
1	PWG	Delivering The Goods	Los Angeles, California	Daniel Garcia defeated Bandido (c) to win the PWG World Championship	
1	NJPW	Wrestling Dontaku	Fukuoka, Japan	Kazuchika Okada (c) defeated Tetsuya Naito to retain the IWGP World Heavyweight Championship	
3	WWE: NXT	Spring Breakin'	Orlando, Florida	Bron Breakker (c) defeated Joe Gacy to retain the NXT Championship	Aired as a special episode of NXT 2.0.
5	AJPW	Champion Carnival 2022 Final	Tokyo, Japan	Yuma Aoyagi defeated Jake Lee to win the 2022 Champion Carnival	
5	Stardom	Golden Week Fight Tour	Fukuoka, Japan	Saya Kamitani (c) defeated Maika to retain the Wonder of Stardom Championship	
7	Impact	Under Siege	Newport, Kentucky	Josh Alexander (c) defeated Tomohiro Ishii to retain the Impact World Championship	
8	WWE: Raw; SmackDown	WrestleMania Backlash	Providence, Rhode Island	The Bloodline (Roman Reigns and The Usos (Jey Uso and Jimmy Uso)) defeated Drew McIntyre and RK-Bro (Randy Orton and Riddle) in a six-man tag team match	
13	Stardom	New Blood 2	Tokyo, Japan	Cosmic Angels (Mina Shirakawa and Unagi Sayaka) and Haruka Umesaki defeated YoungOED (Starlight Kid, Ruaka and Rina)	
13	MLW	Kings of Colosseum	Philadelphia, Pennsylvania	Jacob Fatu defeated Mads Krügger in a Weapons of Mass Destruction match	
14	NJPW	Capital Collision	Washington, D.C.	Juice Robinson defeated Hiroshi Tanahashi (c), Will Ospreay and Jon Moxley in a four-way match to win the IWGP United States Heavyweight Championship	
14	AJPW	AJPW 50th Anniversary Tour Sapporo	Sapporo, Hokkaido, Japan	Twin Towers (Kohei Sato and Shuji Ishikawa) defeated Runaway SUPLEX (Shotaro Ashino and Suwama) (c) to win the AJPW World Tag Team Championship	
15	AJPW	AJPW 50th Anniversary Tour Sapporo	Sapporo, Hokkaido, Japan	Kento Miyahara (c) defeated Yuma Aoyagi to retain the Triple Crown Heavyweight Championship	
23	Independent	Hana Kimura Memorial Show 2	Tokyo, Japan	Syuri defeated Asuka	
28	Stardom	Flashing Champions	Tokyo, Japan	Syuri (c) defeated Risa Sera to retain the World of Stardom Championship	
29	AEW	Double or Nothing	Paradise, Nevada	CM Punk defeated "Hangman" Adam Page (c) to win the AEW World Championship	Featured the finals of the inaugural men's and women's Owen Hart Cup tournaments.
31	AJPW	Jumbo Tsuruta 23rd Anniversary Memorial Service	Tokyo, Japan	Jake Lee, Joe Doering and Takao Omori vs. Jun Akiyama, Kento Miyahara and Minoru Suzuki ended in a time limit draw.	
(c) – denotes defending champion(s)

=== June ===
Date	Promotion(s)	Event	Location	Main Event	Notes
4	WWE: NXT	In Your House	Orlando, Florida	Bron Breakker (c) defeated Joe Gacy to retain the NXT Championship	
5	WWE: Raw; SmackDown	Hell in a Cell	Rosemont, Illinois	Cody Rhodes defeated Seth "Freakin" Rollins in a Hell in a Cell match	
5	AJPW	Over The Future	Tokyo, Japan	Hitamaru Sasaki defeated Kotaro Nasu	
11	NWA	Alwayz Ready	Knoxville, Tennessee	Trevor Murdoch defeated Nick Aldis, Thom Latimer, and Sam Shaw to win the vacant NWA Worlds Heavyweight Championship	
12	NJPW	Dominion 6.12 in Osaka-jo Hall	Osaka, Japan	Jay White defeated Kazuchika Okada (c) to win the IWGP World Heavyweight Championship	
12	CF: DDT; Noah; TJPW; GanPro	CyberFight Festival 2022	Saitama, Japan	Satoshi Kojima defeated Go Shiozaki (c) to win the GHC Heavyweight Championship	
15	AEW	Road Rager	St. Louis, Missouri	The Young Bucks (Matt and Nick Jackson) defeated Jurassic Express (Jungle Boy and Luchasaurus) (c) in a ladder match to win the AEW World Tag Team Championship	Aired as a special episode of Dynamite.
15	AEW	Road Rager	St. Louis, Missouri	Darby Allin defeated Bobby Fish	Aired on tape delay on June 17 as a special episode of Rampage.
15	AJPW	Fortune Dream 7	Tokyo, Japan	Daichi Hashimoto, Kazusada Higuchi and Yuma Aoyagi defeated Daisuke Sekimoto, Shuji Ishikawa and Yuji Hino	
18	AAA	Triplemanía XXX: Tijuana	Tijuana, Mexico	Los Hermanos Lee (Dragon Lee and Dralístico) defeated Matt Hardy and Johnny Hardy	
19	AJPW	Champions Night IV: 50th Anniversary	Tokyo, Japan	Jake Lee defeated Kento Miyahara (c) to win the Triple Crown Heavyweight Championship	
19	NOAH	Back To Kobe! Live	Kobe, Hyogo, Japan	Daiki Inaba, Daisuke Harada, Hao, Kaito Kiyomiya and Satoshi Kojima defeated Kongo (Hi69, Katsuhiko Nakajima, Kenoh, Manabu Soya and Tadasuke)	
19	Impact	Slammiversary	Nashville, Tennessee	Josh Alexander (c) defeated Eric Young to retain the Impact World Championship	
21	CMLL	63. Aniversario Arena Coliseo Guadalajara	Guadalajara, Jalisco, Mexico	Atlantis Jr., El Soberano Jr. and Mistico defeated Averno, El Hijo del Villano III and Mephisto	
23	MLW	Battle Riot IV	New York, New York	Jacob Fatu lastly eliminated The Real1 to win the 40-man Battle Riot match to earn an MLW World Heavyweight Championship match	
24	CMLL	Copa Dinastias 2022 Finals	Mexico City, Mexico	El Soberano Jr. ans Euforia defeated Los Guerreros Laguneros (Gran Guerrero and Ultimo Guerrero)	
26	AEW; NJPW	Forbidden Door	Chicago, Illinois	Jon Moxley defeated Hiroshi Tanahashi to win the interim AEW World Championship	
26	Stardom	Fight in the Top	Nagoya, Japan	Stars (Mayu Iwatani, Koguma and Hazuki) defeated Queen's Quest (Utami Hayashishita, AZM and Saya Kamitani) in a steel cage match	Featured the first ever steel cage matches promoted by Stardom.
29	AEW	Blood & Guts	Detroit, Michigan	Eddie Kingston, Santana, Ortiz, and Blackpool Combat Club (Jon Moxley, Wheeler Yuta, and Claudio Castagnoli) defeated The Jericho Appreciation Society (Chris Jericho, Jake Hager, Sammy Guevara, Daniel Garcia, Matt Menard, and Angelo Parker) in a Blood and Guts match	Aired as a special episode of Dynamite.
29	AEW	Royal Rampage	Detroit, Michigan	Toni Storm defeated Nyla Rose	Aired on tape delay as a special episode of Rampage.
(c) – denotes defending champion(s)

=== July ===
Date	Promotion(s)	Event	Location	Main Event	Notes
1	Impact	Against All Odds	Atlanta, Georgia	Josh Alexander (c) defeated Joe Doering to retain the Impact World Championship	
2	WWE: Raw; SmackDown	Money in the Bank	Paradise, Nevada	Theory defeated Drew McIntyre, Madcap Moss, Omos, Riddle, Sami Zayn, Seth "Freakin" Rollins, and Sheamus in the Money in the Bank ladder match for a championship match contract	With this year's event, Money in the Bank was elevated to being regarded as one of WWE's "Big Five" PPVs, along with Royal Rumble, WrestleMania, SummerSlam, and Survivor Series.
3	CF: DDT	King of DDT Tournament 2022 (Finals)	Tokyo, Japan	Kazusada Higuchi defeated Naomi Yoshimura in the finals of the 2022 King of DDT Tournament which was also for the vacant KO-D Openweight Championship	
5	WWE: NXT	The Great American Bash	Orlando, Florida	Bron Breakker (c) defeated Cameron Grimes to retain the NXT Championship	Aired as a special episode of NXT 2.0.
8	Stardom	New Blood 3	Tokyo, Japan	Giulia defeated Miyu Amasaki	
9	Stardom	Mid Summer Champions in Tokyo	Tokyo, Japan	Syuri (c) defeated Momo Watanabe to retain the World of Stardom Championship	
13	AEW	Fyter Fest; Week 1	Savannah, Georgia	Swerve in Our Glory (Keith Lee and Swerve Strickland) defeated The Young Bucks (Matt Jackson and Nick Jackson) (c) and Team Taz (Ricky Starks and Powerhouse Hobbs) in a three-way tag team match to win the AEW World Tag Team Championship	Aired as a special episode of Dynamite.
13	AEW	Fyter Fest; Week 1	Savannah, Georgia	The Lucha Brothers (Penta Oscuro and Rey Fénix) defeated Private Party (Isiah Kassidy and Marq Quen)	Aired on tape delay on July 15 as a special episode of Rampage.
20	AEW	Fyter Fest; Week 2	Duluth, Georgia	Chris Jericho defeated Eddie Kingston in a Barbed Wire Deathmatch; The rest of the Jericho Appreciation Society was suspended above the ring in a shark cage.	Aired as a special episode of Dynamite.
20	AEW	Fyter Fest; Week 2	Duluth, Georgia	Jay Lethal defeated Christopher Daniels	Aired on tape delay on July 22 as a special episode of Rampage.
16	NOAH	Destination	Tokyo, Japan	Kenoh defeats Satoshi Kojima (c) to win the GHC Heavyweight Championship	
18	CMLL	69. Aniversario Arena Puebla	Puebla, Mexico	El Soberano Jr. defeated Volador Jr.	
23	ROH	Death Before Dishonor	Lowell, Massachusetts	FTR (Cash Wheeler and Dax Harwood) (c) defeated The Briscoe Brothers (Jay Briscoe and Mark Briscoe) in a two-out-of-three-falls match to retain the ROH World Tag Team Championship	First ROH PPV event under the ownership of AEW President and CEO Tony Khan.
23	Stardom	Stardom in Showcase vol.1	Nagoya, Japan	Yuu defeated Saya Kamitani and Starlight Kid in a casket match	
24	Stardom	Mid Summer Champions in Nagoya	Nagoya, Japan	Syuri (c) defeated Tam Nakano to retain the World of Stardom Championship	
27	AEW	Fight for the Fallen	Worcester, Massachusetts	Daniel Garcia defeated Bryan Danielson	Aired as a special episode of Dynamite.
27	AEW	Fight for the Fallen	Worcester, Massachusetts	Anna Jay defeated Ruby Soho	Aired on tape delay on July 29 as a special episode of Rampage.
30	NJPW	Music City Mayhem	Nashville, Tennessee	Jon Moxley defeated El Desperado in a no disqualification match	
30	WWE: Raw; SmackDown	SummerSlam	Nashville, Tennessee	Roman Reigns (c) defeated Brock Lesnar in a Last Man Standing match to retain the Undisputed WWE Universal Championship	First SummerSlam to not be held in August.
31	NOAH	Midsummer Clash	Tokyo, Japan	Kaito Kiyomiya, Satoshi Kojima and Takashi Sugiura defeated Kongo (Katsuhiko Nakajima, Kenoh and Manabu Soya	
31	JCP	Ric Flair's Last Match	Nashville, Tennessee	Ric Flair and Andrade El Idolo defeated Jay Lethal and Jeff Jarrett	First JCP event since 1988.
(c) – denotes defending champion(s)

=== August ===
Date	Promotion(s)	Event	Location	Main Event	Notes
5	CF: NOAH	Departure	Tokyo, Japan	HAYATA (c) defeated Shuji Kondo to retain the GHC Junior Heavyweight Championship	
5	AEW	Battle of the Belts III	Grand Rapids, Michigan	Claudio Castagnoli (c) defeated Konosuke Takeshita to retain the ROH World Championship	Aired on tape delay on August 6.
5	AAA	Verano de Escándalo	Aguascalientes, Mexico	Taya and Los Lucha Bros (Fénix and Pentagón Jr.) defeated Chik Tormenta, Taurus, and Hijo del Vikingo	
10	AEW	Quake by the Lake	Minneapolis, Minnesota	Jon Moxley (c) defeated Chris Jericho to retain the AEW Interim World Championship	Aired as a special episode of Dynamite.
10	AEW	Quake by the Lake	Minneapolis, Minnesota	Orange Cassidy defeated Ari Daivari	Aired on tape delay on August 12 as a special episode of Rampage.
12	Impact	Emergence	Cicero, Illinois	Josh Alexander (c) defeated Alex Shelley to retain the Impact World Championship	
16	WWE: NXT	Heatwave	Orlando, Florida	Bron Breakker (c) defeated JD McDonagh to retain the NXT Championship	Aired as a special episode of NXT 2.0.
18	NJPW	G1 Climax 32 (Finals)	Tokyo, Japan	Kazuchika Okada defeated Will Ospreay in the G1 Climax tournament final	Okada received an IWGP World Heavyweight Championship match at Wrestle Kingdom 17.
19	CMLL	CMLL International Gran Prix	Mexico City, Mexico	Team Mexico (Volador Jr.) defeated Team International (Tiger Mask)	
20	AJPW	Royal Road Tournament 2022 Final	Tokyo, Japan	Kento Miyahara defeated Jake Lee to win the 2022 Royal Road Tournament	
20	CF: DDT	Wrestle Peter Pan 2022	Tokyo, Japan	Kazusada Higuchi (c) defeated Tetsuya Endo to retain the KO-D Openweight Championship	
21	NJPW	Fighting Spirit Unleashed	Los Angeles, California	Fred Rosser (c) defeated TJP to retain the Strong Openweight Championship	
21	Stardom	Stardom x Stardom: Nagoya Midsummer Encounter	Nagoya, Japan	Syuri (c) defeated Nanae Takahashi to retain the World of Stardom Championship	
27	MLW	Fury Road	El Paso, Texas	Alex Hammerstone defeated Willie Mack	House show event that was formerly a taping of MLW Fusion.
27	NWA	NWA 74th Anniversary Show	St. Louis, Missouri	Kamille (c) defeated Taya Valkyrie to retain the NWA World Women's Championship	
28	NWA	NWA 74th Anniversary Show	St. Louis, Missouri	Trevor Murdoch (c) defeated Tyrus to retain the NWA Worlds Heavyweight Championship	
28	CMLL	CMLL Lady's Ring	Tokyo, Japan	Tae Honma defeated Hikari Shimizu to win the Mexico Expedition Tournament.	
(c) – denotes defending champion(s)

=== September ===
Date	Promotion(s)	Event	Location	Main Event	Notes
3	CF: NOAH	N-1 Victory 2022 Grand Final	Osaka, Japan	Kaito Kiyomiya defeated Hideki Suzuki to win the 2022 N-1 Victory	
3	WWE: Raw; SmackDown	Clash at the Castle	Cardiff, Wales	Roman Reigns (c) defeated Drew McIntyre to retain the Undisputed WWE Universal Championship	WWE's first major stadium event in the UK in 30 years.
4	WWE: NXT; NXT UK	Worlds Collide	Orlando, Florida	Bron Breakker (NXT) defeated Tyler Bate (NXT UK) to unify the NXT Championship and NXT United Kingdom Championship	Final event for NXT UK before relaunching as NXT Europe in 2023.
4	AEW	All Out	Hoffman Estates, Illinois	CM Punk defeated Jon Moxley (c) to win the AEW World Championship	Featured the final of a tournament for the new AEW World Trios Championship.
13	CMLL	Viva La Coli	Guadalajara, Jalisco, Mexico	Averno, El Hijo del Villano III, and Místico defeat Atlantis Jr., Explosivo, and Ultimo Guerrero	
16	CMLL	89th Anniversary Show	Mexico City, Mexico	Atlantis Jr. defeated Stuka Jr. in a Lucha de Apuestas mask vs. mask match	
18	AJPW	All Japan Pro Wrestling 50th Anniversary	Tokyo, Japan	Kento Miyahara defeated Suwama (c) to win the Triple Crown Heavyweight Championship	
18	MLW; AAA; DG	Super Series	Norcross, Georgia	Komander, Laredo Kid, and Microman defeated Mini Abismo Negro, Black Taurus, and Gino Medina	
20	CMLL	Dia Nacional De La Lucha Libre	Mexico City, Mexico	Gran Guerrero, Rey Bucanero, and Ultimo Guerrero defeated Los Infernales (Averno, El Satanico, and Mephisto)	
21	AEW	Grand Slam	Queens, New York	Jon Moxley defeated Bryan Danielson in a tournament final to win the vacant AEW World Championship	Aired as a special episode of Dynamite.
21	AEW	Grand Slam	Queens, New York	Ricky Starks defeated Powerhouse Hobbs in a Lights Out match	Aired on tape delay on September 23 as a special episode of Rampage.
23	Impact	Victory Road	Nashville, Tennessee	Steve Maclin defeated Sami Callihan and Moose in a Three-way Barbed Wire Massacre	
25	Stardom	Stardom in Showcase vol.2	Tokyo, Japan	Grim Reaper Army (Yuu, Nanae Takahashi and Yuna Manase) defeated Bodyguard Army (Syuri & Queen's Quest (Utami Hayashishita and Lady C))	
25	CF: Noah	Noah Grand Ship In Nagoya	Nagoya, Japan	Kaito Kiyomiya defeated Kenoh (c) to win the GHC Heavyweight Championship	
25	NJPW	Burning Spirit	Kobe, Japan	Will Ospreay (c) defeated David Finlay to retain the IWGP United States Heavyweight Championship	
25	CMLL; Ice Ribbon	CMLL X Ice Ribbon	Saitama, Japan	Dalys (c) defeated Tae Honma to retain the CMLL Japan Women's Championship	
30	CMLL	Noche de Campeones	Mexico City, Mexico	Místico (c) defeated Rugido to retain the NWA World Historic Middleweight Championship	
(c) – denotes defending champion(s)

=== October ===
Date	Promotion(s)	Event	Location	Main Event	Notes
1	Stardom	Stardom 5 Star Grand Prix 2022 (Finals)	Tokyo, Japan	Giulia defeated Tam Nakano in the finals of the 2022 5Star Grand Prix Tournament	
1	NJPW	Royal Quest II	London, England	FTR (Cash Wheeler and Dax Harwood) (c) defeated Aussie Open (Mark Davis and Kyle Fletcher) to retain the IWGP Tag Team Championship	
2	NJPW	Royal Quest II	London, England	Tetsuya Naito defeated Zack Sabre Jr.	Naito earned a future match for the IWGP United States Heavyweight Championship.
7	AEW	Battle of the Belts IV	Washington, D.C.	FTR (Cash Wheeler and Dax Harwood) (c) defeated Gates of Agony (Toa Liona and Kaun) to retain the ROH World Tag Team Championship	First Battle of the Belts to air on a Friday.
7	Impact	Bound for Glory	Albany, New York	Josh Alexander (c) defeated Eddie Edwards to retain the Impact World Championship	
8	WWE: Raw; SmackDown	Extreme Rules	Philadelphia, Pennsylvania	Matt Riddle defeated Seth "Freakin" Rollins in a Fight Pit match with Daniel Cormier as the special guest referee	The event saw the return of Bray Wyatt to WWE.
8	GCW	Fight Club	Atlantic City, New Jersey	Nick Gage defeated Jon Moxley (c) in a Championship vs. Career match to win the GCW World Championship	
9	GCW	Fight Club	Atlantic City, New Jersey	Rina Yamashita (c) defeated Ciclope in a Death match to retain the GCW Ultraviolent Championship	
9	TJPW	Wrestle Princess III	Tokyo, Japan	Yuka Sakazaki defeated Shoko Nakajima (c) to win the Princess of Princess Championship	
10	NJPW	Declaration of Power	Tokyo, Japan	Jay White (c) defeated Tama Tonga to retain the IWGP World Heavyweight Championship	
10	AJPW	Legacy II	Tokyo, Japan	Kento Miyahara, Kota Minoura and Shiro Koshinaka defeat Hideki Suzuki, Madoka Kikuta and Yuma Aoyagi	
15	AAA	Triplemanía XXX: Mexico City	Azcapotzalco, Mexico	Pentagón Jr. defeated Villano IV in a Lucha de Apuestas Mask vs. Mask match	
18	AEW	Title Tuesday	Cincinnati, Ohio	Jon Moxley (c) defeated "Hangman" Adam Page by referee stoppage to retain the AEW World Championship.	
19	Stardom	New Blood 5	Tokyo, Japan	Ami Sourei defeated Hanan (c) to win the Future of Stardom Championship	
21	CMLL	CMLL Universal Amazons Championship	Mexico City, Mexico	Lluvia defeated La Jarochita to win the 2022 CMLL Universal Amazons Championship	
22	AJPW	50th Anniversary In Sanjo: The Soul Of A Champion	Sanjo, Niigata, Japan	Kento Miyahara (c) defeated Takao Omori to retain the Triple Crown Heavyweight Championship	
22	WWE: NXT	Halloween Havoc	Orlando, Florida	Bron Breakker (c) defeated Ilja Dragunov and JD McDonagh to retain the NXT Championship	
22	XPW	Halloween In Hell III	Pomona, California	SHLAK (c) defeated Angel to retain the XPW King of the Deathmatch Championship	
27	NJPW	The Night Before Rumble on 44th Street	New York City, New York	Chaos (Kazuchika Okada and Yoh), Amazing Red, Eddie Kingston, Homicide, and Jon Moxley defeated Bullet Club (El Phantasmo, Jay White, and Juice Robinson) and Team Filthy (Jorel Nelson, Royce Isaacs, and Tom Lawlor)	
28	NJPW	Rumble on 44th Street	New York City, New York	Bullet Club (Jay White and Juice Robinson) defeated Kazuchika Okada and Eddie Kingston	
28	CMLL	International Women's Grand Prix	Mexico City, Mexico	Team Mexico (Dalys la Caribeña, Faby Apache, La Amapola, La Jarochita, Lluvia, Marcela, Princesa Sugehit, and Reyna Isis) defeated Team World (Alex Gracia, Avispa Dorada, Hikari Shimizu, Ivelisse, Lady Frost, Mei Suruga, Stephanie Vaquer, and Tae Honma)	
30	AJPW	Halloween ManiaX	Tokyo, Japan	Kento Miyahara and Rising HAYATO defeated Atsuki Aoyagi and Yuma Aoyagi	
30	MLW	Fightland	Philadelphia, Pennsylvania	Jacob Fatu defeated Lio Rush	
30	CF: Noah	Noah Ariake Triumph 2022	Tokyo, Japan	Kaito Kiyomiya (c) defeated Kazuyuki Fujita to retain the GHC Heavyweight Championship	
(c) – denotes defending champion(s)

=== November ===
Date	Promotion(s)	Event	Location	Main Event	Notes
1	CMLL	Dia de los Muertos; Night 1	Mexico City, Mexico	Stuka Jr. defeated Dragón Rojo Jr. in the finals of the Cybernetic Tournament	
3	Stardom	Hiroshima Goddess Festival	Hiroshima, Japan	Syuri (c) defeated Maika to retain the World of Stardom Championship	
4	CMLL	Dia de los Muertos; Night 2	Mexico City, Mexico	Stuka Jr. defeated El Terrible (c) to win the CMLL Rey del Inframundo Championship	
5	WWE: Raw; SmackDown	Crown Jewel	Riyadh, Saudi Arabia	Roman Reigns (c) defeated Logan Paul to retain the Undisputed WWE Universal Championship	
5	NJPW	Battle Autumn '22	Osaka, Japan	Will Ospreay (c) defeated Tetsuya Naito to retain the IWGP United States Heavyweight Championship	
10	CF: Noah	Noah Global Honored Crown 2022	Tokyo, Japan	Kaito Kiyomiya (c) defeated Timothy Thatcher to retain the GHC Heavyweight Championship	
11	CF: Noah; DG	Global Dream	Tokyo, Japan	Kenoh and Kota Minoura defeated Kaito Kiyomiya and Yuki Yoshioka	
11	NJPW	Tamashii; Night 1	Christchurch, New Zealand	Taiji Ishimori defeated Aaron Solo	
12	NJPW	Anjo City 70th Anniversary	Aichi, Japan	Toru Yano, Tomohiro Ishii, and Kazuchika Okada defeated Tomoaki Honma, Togi Makabe, and Hiroshi Tanahashi	
12	NWA	Hard Times 3	Chalmette, Louisiana	Tyrus defeated Trevor Murdoch (c) and Matt Cardona to win the NWA Worlds Heavyweight Championship	
13	NJPW	Tamashii; Night 2	Sydney, Australia	Kenta defeated Andrew Villalobos	
18	Impact	Over Drive	Louisville, Kentucky	Josh Alexander (c) defeated Frankie Kazarian to retain the Impact World Championship	
19	Stardom	Stardom Gold Rush	Osaka, Japan	Stars (Mayu Iwatani, Hazuki & Koguma) defeated Donna Del Mondo (Giulia, Thekla & Mai Sakurai) in a Six-woman tag team Tables, Ladders, and Chairs match in the Moneyball tournament final	
19	AEW	Full Gear	Newark, New Jersey	MJF defeated Jon Moxley (c) to win the AEW World Championship	
20	NJPW; Stardom	Historic X-Over	Tokyo, Japan	Kairi defeated Mayu Iwatani in the finals of the inaugural IWGP Women's Championship tournament	
23	CF: Noah	Noah The Best 2022	Tokyo, Japan	El Hijo del Dr. Wagner Jr. (c) defeated Yoshiki Inamura to retain the GHC National Championship	
23	AEW	Thanksgiving Eve Dynamite	Chicago, Illinois	Chris Jericho (c) defeated Tomohiro Ishii by pinfall to retain the ROH World Championship	
26	Stardom	Stardom in Showcase vol.3	Kawasaki, Japan	Neo Stardom Army (Nanae Takahashi, Yuu & Reaper Mask) defeated Donna Del Mondo (Giulia, Thekla & Mai Sakurai) in an Exploding Coffin match	
26	2AW	Junior Festival	Tokyo, Japan	Akira Jumonji, Hashinosuke and Oji Shiiba defeated Chicharito Shoki, Super Macho Monkey and Tyson Maeguchi	
26	WWE: Raw; SmackDown	Survivor Series: WarGames	Boston, Massachusetts	The Bloodline (Roman Reigns, Sami Zayn, Solo Sikoa, and The Usos (Jey Uso and Jimmy Uso)) defeated The Brawling Brutes (Sheamus, Ridge Holland, and Butch), Drew McIntyre, and Kevin Owens in a WarGames match	First WWE main roster event to feature the WarGames match.
(c) – denotes defending champion(s)

=== December ===
Date	Promotion(s)	Event	Location	Main Event	Notes
2	Impact	Throwback Throwdown III	Winston-Salem, North Carolina	Team Impact Provincial Wrestling Federation (Colt McCoy, Tim Burr, Frank the Butcher, Giuseppe Scovelli Jr. and Giuseppe Scovelli Sr.) defeated Team Great Lakes Unionized Wrestling (Devon Damon, Neptune, Lord Humongous and Manfred the Mad Mammal) in a 5-on-4 Handicap Elimination tag team match	
4	Stardom	Goddesses of Stardom Tag League (Finals)	Chiba, Japan	7Upp (Nanae Takahashi and Yuu) defeated AphrOditE (Utami Hayashishita and Saya Kamitani) in the 2022 Goddesses of Stardom Tag League finals	
9	CMLL	Copa Bicentenarios 2022	Mexico City, Mexico	Místico and Rocky Romero defeated Lince Dorado and Volador Jr. to win the Copa Bicentenarios 2022.	
10	ROH	Final Battle	Arlington, Texas	Claudio Castagnoli defeated Chris Jericho (c) to win the ROH World Championship	
10	WWE: NXT	Deadline	Orlando, Florida	Bron Breakker (c) defeated Apollo Crews to retain the NXT Championship	
13	CMLL	Torneo Heredero	Guadalajara, Jalisco, Mexico	Atlantis Jr. defeated Dark Panther to win the Torneo Heredero	
14	AEW	Winter Is Coming	Garland, Texas	MJF (c) defeated Ricky Starks to retain both the AEW World Championship and AEW Dynamite Diamond Ring	Aired as a special episode of Dynamite.
16	Stardom	New Blood 6	Tokyo, Japan	Ami Sourei (c) defeated Ruaka to retain the Future of Stardom Championship	
18	CF: Noah	New Hope	Tokyo, Japan	Satoshi Kojima defeated Yasutaka Yano	
18	CMLL	Posada Navidena	Mexico City, Mexico	Explosivo, Fantastico and Trono defeated Guerrero de la Muerte, Leo and Omar Brunetti in a Best Two Out Of Three Falls Six Man Tag Team Match.	
20	CF: Noah; Tokyo Gurentai	Tokyo Dream Final: Last Festival	Tokyo, Japan	Kongo (Hajime Ohara, Hi69, Katsuhiko Nakajima, Kenoh, Manabu Soya and Tadasuke) defeated Tokyo Gurentai (Fujita, Kikuzawa, Mazada, Nosawa Rongai and Takemura) and Dick Togo	
21	AJPW	Xmas EVE 4	Tokyo, Japan	Jake Lee and Naoya Nomura vs. Kento Miyahara and Yuma Aoyagi ended in a time-limit draw.	
21	AEW	Holiday Bash	San Antonio, Texas	Jamie Hayter (c) defeated Hikaru Shida to retain the AEW Women's World Championship	Aired as a special episode of Dynamite.
21	AEW	Holiday Bash	San Antonio, Texas	Jay Lethal and Jeff Jarrett defeated Anthony Bowens and Daddy Ass	Aired on tape delay on December 23 as a special episode of Rampage.
23	CF: Noah	N Innovation 2022	Tokyo, Japan	Amakusa defeated Dante Leon (c) to win the GHC Junior Heavyweight Championship	
23	CMLL	Gran Alternativa 2022	Mexico City, Mexico	Místico and Panterita del Ring Jr. defeated Gran Guerrero and Raider to win the Gran Alternativa 2022.	
25	AJPW	XMas Maniax	Tokyo, Japan	Atsuki Aoyagi, Kento Miyahara, Taichi and Yoshinobu Kanemaru vs. Los Ingobernables de Japon (Bushi and Sanada), Jake Lee and Yuma Aoyagi ended in a time-limit draw.	
25	CMLL	Funcion Espacial De Navidad	Mexico City, Mexico	Atlantis Jr., Místico and Volador Jr. defeated Los Infernales (Euforia, Hechicero and Mephisto) in a Best Two Out Of Three Falls Six Man Tag Team Match	
28	AAA	Noche de Campeones	Acapulco, Guerrero, Mexico	Hijo del Vikingo (c) defeated Bandido to retain the AAA Mega Championship	
28	AEW	New Year's Smash	Broomfield, Colorado	Samoa Joe (c) defeated Wardlow to retain the AEW TNT Championship	Aired as a special episode of Dynamite.
28	AEW	New Year's Smash	Broomfield, Colorado	Swerve Strickland defeated Wheeler Yuta	Aired on tape delay on December 30 as a special episode of Rampage.
28	NJPW	Ganryujima in Ryogoku	Tokyo, Japan	Katsuyori Shibata defeated Tom Lawlor in a UWF Rules Match	
29	Stardom	Dream Queendom 2	Tokyo, Japan	Giulia defeated Syuri (c) to win the World of Stardom Championship	
29	CF: DDT	Never Mind 2022	Tokyo, Japan	Kazusada Higuchi (c) defeated Yuki Ueno to retain the KO-D Openweight Championship	
30	CMLL	Torneo Heredero	Guadalajara, Jalisco, Mexico	Dark Panther, Dulce Gardenia and Místico defeat Averno, Felino Jr. and Zandokan Jr. in a Best Two Out Of Three Falls Six Man Tag Team Match	
(c) – denotes defending champion(s)

== Notable events ==
- January 5 – AEW Dynamite premiered on TBS
- January 8 – All Elite Wrestling's quarterly Battle of the Belts premiered on TNT
- January 8 – NWA USA premiered on YouTube
- January 26 – Ring of Honor announced the creation of the ROH Hall of Fame
- February 15 – WWE's 205 Live brand ceased operations
- February 18 – WWE NXT Level Up premiered on Peacock and the WWE Network, replacing WWE 205 Live
- March 2 – All Elite Wrestling President and Chief Executive Officer Tony Khan acquired Ring of Honor separately from AEW
- March 3 – WWE Network and all WWE programming terminated in Russia due to worldwide sanctions in the wake of the invasion of Ukraine.
- April 1 – Ring of Honor returned after a hiatus with Supercard of Honor XV
- May 16 – Jim Crockett Promotions, which was purchased by Turner Broadcasting System in 1988, was revived and held Ric Flair's Last Match on July 31.
- July 22 – Vince McMahon retired as chairman and chief executive officer of WWE; McMahon had served in these positions since 1982.
- July 29 – New Japan Pro-Wrestling and World Wonder Ring Stardom, both owned by entertainment company Bushiroad, announced the creation of the IWGP Women's Championship. The inaugural champion was crowned at the Historic X-Over joint event on November 20.
- September 4 – Worlds Collide was the final event for WWE's NXT UK brand, which was planned to relaunch as NXT Europe in 2023, but these plans were delayed with WWE aiming to relaunch it in 2024.

== Accomplishments and tournaments ==
=== 2AW ===
Accomplishment	Winner(s)	Date won	Notes
Active Advance Tournament	Ayato Yoshida	November 27	Defeated Shu Asakawa in the final.

=== AAA ===
Accomplishment	Winner(s)	Date won	Notes
Rey de Reyes	Psycho Clown	February 19	Defeated Cibernético, Laredo Kid, Bandido, and Heavy Metal in the final.
Copa Triplemanía	Micro Man	April 30	Defeated Heavy Metal, Faby Apache, Willie Mack, Charly Manson, Toscano, La Diva Salvaje, Jessy Ventura, Dulce Canela, La Hiedra, and Lady Shani in a Lumberjacks with Straps match.
Copa Triplemanía	Niño Hamburguesa	June 18	Last eliminated Mamba in a 13-person match also involving Mr. Iguana, Abismo Negro Jr., Bestia 666, Charly Manson, Cibernético, Dulce Kanela, Heavy Metal, Mecha Wolf 450, Pagano, Rey Xolo, and Vampiro.
Copa Triplemanía	Taurus	October 15	Defeated Electroshock, Chessman, Sexy Star II, Lady Shani, Flip Gordon, La Diva Salvaje, Jessy Ventura, Aero Star, La Hiedra, and Jack Evans.
Ruleta de la Muerte	Pentagón Jr.	October 15	Defeated Villano IV in the final of an 8-man reverse elimination tournament, with the stipulation that the loser would be forced to unmask.
Showcenter Tournament (Women)	La Hiedra	October 23	Defeated Chik Tormenta in the final.
Showcenter Tournament (Men)	Laredo Kid	October 23	Defeated Hijo del Vikingo in the final.
Copa Mundial Imperial	Pagano	December 28	Defeated Dave the Clown, Murder Clown, Panic Clown, La Parka Negra, Aero Star, Blue Demon Jr., Jessy Ventura, La Diva Salvaje, Mr. Iguana, Niño Hamburguesa, and Vampiro.

=== AJPW ===
Accomplishment	Winner(s)	Date won	Notes
Triple Crown Heavyweight Championship Tournament	Kento Miyahara	January 22	Defeated Ryuki Honda in the final to win the vacant title.
Champion Carnival	Yuma Aoyagi	May 4	Defeated Jake Lee in the final for a Triple Crown Heavyweight Championship match but was unsuccessful in winning the title.
Six-Man Tournament	Strong Hearts (Issei Onitsuka, Shigehiro Irie, and T-Hawk)	June 12	Defeated Gungir of Anarchy (Ryuki Honda, Seigo Tachibana, and Shotaro Ashino) in the final.
Royal Road Tournament	Kento Miyahara	August 20	Defeated Jake Lee in the final for a Triple Crown Heavyweight Championship match. He would defeat Suwama on September 18 to win the title.
Jr. Battle of Glory	Atsuki Aoyagi	December 7	Defeated Dan Tamura in the final to earn a World Junior Heavyweight Championship match.
Real World Tag League	Kento Miyahara and Takuya Nomura	December 7	Defeated Shuji Ishikawa and Cyrus in the final to earn a World Tag Team Championship match.

=== AEW ===
Accomplishment	Winner(s)	Date won	Notes
TBS Championship Tournament	Jade Cargill	January 5	Defeated Ruby Soho in the tournament final to determine the inaugural AEW TBS Champion.
Revolution Tag Team Battle Royale	reDRagon (Bobby Fish and Kyle O'Reilly)	February 23	O'Reilly last eliminated Matt Jackson of The Young Bucks to earn a spot in the AEW World Tag Team Championship match at Revolution, but they were unsuccessful in winning the title.
Casino Tag Team Royale	The Young Bucks (Matt Jackson and Nick Jackson)	March 2	Matt last eliminated Darius Martin of Top Flight to earn a spot in the AEW World Tag Team Championship match at Revolution, but they were unsuccessful in winning the title.
Face of the Revolution Ladder Match	Wardlow	March 6	Defeated Keith Lee, Powerhouse Hobbs, Ricky Starks, Orange Cassidy, and Christian Cage to earn an AEW TNT Championship match. Wardlow received his title match on the special "St. Patrick's Day Slam" episode of Dynamite on March 16, but was unsuccessful in winning the championship.
Owen Hart Cup (Women)	Dr. Britt Baker, D.M.D.	May 29	Defeated Ruby Soho in the final of an eight-woman tournament for The Owen Trophy and Championship belt.
Owen Hart Cup (Men)	Adam Cole	May 29	Defeated Samoa Joe in the final of an eight-man tournament for The Owen Trophy and Championship belt.
Casino Battle Royale (Men)	Kyle O'Reilly	June 8	Last eliminated Wheeler Yuta for a spot in the AEW Interim World Championship Eliminator Series.
AEW Interim World Championship Eliminator Series	Jon Moxley	June 26	Shortly after winning the AEW World Championship, CM Punk suffered an injury that required surgery. A mini-tournament was set up to determine an interim champion until Punk's return. Moxley defeated Hiroshi Tanahashi in the series final to become the interim AEW World Champion.
AEW All-Atlantic Championship Tournament	Pac	June 26	Defeated Malakai Black, Miro, and Clark Connors in the final to become the inaugural AEW All-Atlantic Champion.
Royal Rampage Battle Royal	Brody King	June 29 (aired July 1)	Last eliminated Darby Allin to earn an interim AEW World Championship match on the July 6 episode of Dynamite but was unsuccessful in winning the title.
AEW World Trios Championship Tournament	The Elite (Kenny Omega, Matt Jackson, and Nick Jackson)	September 4	Defeated "Hangman" Adam Page and The Dark Order (Alex Reynolds and John Silver) in the final to become the inaugural AEW World Trios Champions.
Casino Ladder Match	MJF (Note: Won the match under a mask as "The Joker"; revealed his identity at the end of the show.)	September 4	Defeated Claudio Castagnoli, Wheeler Yuta, Penta El Zero Miedo, Rey Fénix, Rush, Andrade El Idolo, and Dante Martin to earn a future match for the AEW World Championship. MJF cashed in his opportunity at Full Gear and defeated Jon Moxley to win the championship.
AEW Grand Slam Tournament of Champions	Jon Moxley	September 21	Defeated Bryan Danielson in the tournament final for the vacant AEW World Championship.
Golden Ticket Battle Royal	"Hangman" Adam Page	September 21 (aired September 23)	Last eliminated Rush to earn an AEW World Championship match on the October 18 episode of Dynamite but was unsuccessful in winning the title.
AEW World Championship Eliminator Tournament	Ricky Starks	November 23	Starks defeated Ethan Page in the AEW World Championship Eliminator Tournament final to receive an AEW World Championship match. Starks also won the 12-man Dynamite Diamond Battle Royale by last eliminating Page to advance to the Dynamite Diamond Final for the AEW Dynamite Diamond Ring. As MJF was the reigning AEW World Champion and reigning Dynamite Diamond Ring holder, he was scheduled to defend both the championship and ring in a Winner Takes All match against Starks at Dynamite: Winter Is Coming on December 14, where he defeated Starks to retain both.
Dynamite Diamond Battle Royale	Ricky Starks	December 7	
Three Kings Christmas Casino Trios Royale	A. R. Fox and Top Flight (Darius Martin and Dante Martin)	December 21 (aired December 23)	Top Flight last eliminated Claudio Castagnoli of the Blackpool Combat Club to win a $300,000 cash prize.

=== BJW ===
Accomplishment	Winner(s)	Date won	Notes
Ikkitousen Strong Climb	Daisuke Sekimoto	February 20	Defeated Yasufumi Nakanoue in the final.
Bloody Musou Tournament	Hideyoshi Kamitani	August 28 (aired September 4)	Defeated Abdullah Kobayashi in a Fluorescent Lighttubes Jungle Deathmatch to win the vacant BJW Deathmatch Heavyweight Championship.
Toshiwasure! Shuffle Six Man Tag Team Tournament	Daichi Hashimoto, Yuki Ueno, and Yuma Aoyagi	December 31	Defeated Mao, Yuko Miyamoto, and Yuka Aoki in the final.

=== The Crash ===
Accomplishment	Winner(s)	Date won	Notes
Copa Juvenil	Terror Azteca	February 20	Defeated Kamik-C, Lazer, Mirage, and Ryan Kidd in a four-way match.

=== CMLL ===
Accomplishment	Winner(s)	Date won	Note
Reyes del Aire	Stuka Jr.	January 28	Defeated Atlantis Jr. in the final by disqualification after Atlantis Jr. tore off Stuka Jr.'s mask
Torneo Increible de Parejas	Atlantis Jr.	February 25	Defeated Averno and Mistico in the final.
Mexican National Heavyweight Championship Tournament	Euforia	March 4	Defeated Gran Guerrero in the final to win the vacant title.
CMLL World Lightweight Championship Tournament	Stigma	March 15	Defeated Suicida in the final to win the vacant title.
CMLL World Trios Championship Tournament	Los Malditos (El Sagrado, Gemelo Diablo I, and Gemelo Diablo II)	March 18	Defeated Atlantis and Los Guerreros Laguneros (Gran Guerrero and Último Guerrero) in the final to win the vacant title.
CMLL Arena Coliseo Tag Team Championship Tournament	Hombre Bala Jr. and Robin	April 2	Defeated La Ola Negra (Akuma and Espanto Jr.) in the final to win the vacant title.
Campeon Universal Del CMLL	Místico	April 29	Defeated Titán in the final.
La Copa Junior	Atlantis Jr.	May 27	Defeated Místico in a two-out-of-three falls match final.
Copa Dinastias	El Soberano Jr. and Euforia	June 10	Defeated Flyer and Volador Jr. in the final.
Leyenda de Plata	Templario	July 29	Defeated El Soberano Jr. in the final.
International Gran Prix	Volador Jr.	August 19	Last eliminated Tiger Mask IV to win for Team Mexico.
Copa Independencia	Ángel de Oro	September 16	Defeated Místico and Volador Jr. in the final.
Cuadrangular Eliminatorio De Parejas Increibles	Atlantis Jr.	September 17	Defeated Stuka Jr. in a Lucha de Apuestes Mask vs. Mask final.
CMLL Universal Amazons Championship	Lluvia	October 21	Defeated La Jarochita in the final.
CMLL World Tag Team Championship #1 Contender's Tournament	Los Gemelos Diablo (Gemelo Diablo I and Gemelo Diablo II)	October 16	Defeated Dragón Rojo Jr. and El Hijo del Villano III in the final to earn a CMLL World Tag Team Championship match but were unsuccessful.
International Women's Gran Prix	Dalys	October 28	Last eliminated Lady Frost to win for Team Mexico.
Copa Bicentenario Varonil	Místico and Rocky Romero	December 9	Defeated Lince Dorado and Volador Jr. in the final.
Copa Bicentenario Femenil	Dalys and Lady Frost	December 9	Defeated Ivelisse and La Jarochita in the final.
Torneo Heredero	Atlantis and Atlantis Jr.	December 13	Atlantis defeated Dark Panther in the final.
Torneo Gran Alternativa	Místico and Panterita del Ring Jr.	December 23	Defeated Gran Guerrero and Raider in the final. Volador Jr. was Panterita's original partner, but was unable to compete after being infected with COVID-19, so he was replaced by Místico.

=== DDT ===
Accomplishment	Winner(s)	Date won	Notes
Ultimate Tag League	DISASTER BOX (Harashima and Naomi Yoshimura)	February 27	Defeated The 37Kamiina (Konosuke Takeshita and Shunma Katsumata) to win the 2022 Ultimate Tag League Trophy and the vacant KO-D Tag Team Championship.
King of Street Wrestling	Chris Brookes	April 23	Defeated Abdullah Kobayashi in the final.
KO-D 6-Man Tag Team Championship Tournament	DAMNATION T.A. (Daisuke Sasaki, MJ Paul, and Kanon)	May 20	Defeated Eruption (Yukio Sakaguchi, Kazusada Higuchi, and Hideki Okatani) in the final to win the vacant title.
King of DDT Tournament	Kazusada Higuchi	July 3	Defeated Naomi Yoshimura in the final to win the vacant KO-D Openweight Championship.
D-Oh Grand Prix	Yuki Ueno	December 4	Defeated Yukio Naya in the final to earn a KO-D Openweight Championship match.
Toshiwasure! Shuffle Six Man Tag Team Tournament	Daichi Hashimoto, Yuki Ueno, and Yuma Aoyagi	December 31	Defeated Mao, Yuko Miyamoto, and Yuka Aoki in the final.

=== TJPW ===
Accomplishment	Winner(s)	Date won	Notes
Futari No Princess Max Heart Tournament	Hakuchuumu (Miu Watanabe and Rika Tatsumi)	February 11	Defeated BAKURETSU Sisters (Nodoka Tenma & Yuki Aino) in the final.
Tokyo Princess Cup	Yuka Sakazaki	August 14	Defeated Miu Watanabe in the final.

=== GanPro ===
Accomplishment	Winner(s)	Date won	Notes
Hardcore Mixed Tag DAY 1 Tournament	Itsuki Aoki and Shigehiro Irie	January 10	Defeated Asuka and Shota in the final.

=== DG ===
Accomplishment	Winner(s)	Date won	Notes
Open the Triangle Gate Championship Tournament	Natural Vibes (Kzy, U-T, and Jacky "Funky" Kamei)	February 20	Defeated Z-Brats (H.Y.O, BxB Hulk, and Shun Skywalker) in the final to win the vacant title.
King of Gate	Yuki Yoshioka	June 3	Defeated Kota Minoura in the final.

=== Gleat ===
Accomplishment	Winner(s)	Date won	Notes
G-Rex Championship First Champion Decision Tournament	El Lindaman	February 22	Defeated Hayato Tamura in the final to become the inaugural champion.
G-Infinity Championship First Champion Decision Tournament	Bulk Orchestra (Kazma Sakamoto and Ryuichi Kawakami)	August 24	Defeated Strong Hearts (Cima and T-Hawk) in the final to become the inaugural champions.

=== GCW ===
Accomplishment	Winner(s)	Date won	Notes
Do or Die Rumble	Homicide	January 1	Last eliminated Atticus Cogar to earn a GCW World Championship match. He would unsuccessfully challenge Jon Moxley for the title at The Wrld On GCW
Grab The Brass Ring ladder match	AJ Gray	January 23	Defeated PCO, Alex Colon, G-Rave, Tony Deppen, Jimmy Lloyd, and Jordan Oliver to win a match of his choosing at any time. Gray chose to challenge Jon Moxley for the GCW World Championship at Joey Janela's Spring Break 6 Part 1, but was unsuccessful.
Clusterfuck Battle Royal	The Second Gear Crew (AJ Gray, Mance Warner, and Matthew Justice)	April 1	
Tournament of Survival	Drew Parker	June 4	Defeated Matt Tremont in the final.
Nick Gage Invitational	John Wayne Murdoch	November 12	Defeated Alex Colon in the final.

=== IWRG ===
Accomplishment	Winner(s)	Date won	Notes
Tryout Tournament	Yorvak	March 6	Defeated Estrella de Oro in the final.
100. Torneo FILL	La Juaria Jaucan (Dick Angelo 3G and Lengendario)	October 20	Defeated El Hijo de Payaso Purasanta and Payaso Purasanta Jr. in the final.
Copa IWRG	El Hijo del Alebrije	December 16	Defeated AK47, Avisman, Bestia Rubia, Bombero Infernal, Cerebro Negro Jr., Jhon Tito, Legendario, Relampago, Rey Halcon Jr., Super Yens, and Mega.
IWRG Intercontinental Women's Championship Tournament	Diosa Quetzal	December 16	Defeated Keyra in the final to win the vacant title. The title had been inactive since 2007.

=== Impact ===
Accomplishment	Winner(s)	Date won	Notes
Gauntlet for the Gold (Heavyweight)	Eric Young	May 8 (aired May 12)	Last eliminated Chris Sabin to earn an Impact World Championship match at Slammiversary. He would challenge Josh Alexander for the title at the event but was unsuccessful in winning it.
Call Your Shot Gauntlet	Bully Ray	October 7	Last eliminated Steve Maclin to win the Call Your Shot Trophy and a contract for a championship match of his choosing within one year. Ray chose to challenge Josh Alexander for the Impact World Championship at Hard To Kill in a Full Metal Mayhem match, but was unsuccessful in winning the title.
Impact X Division Championship Tournament	Trey Miguel	November 18	Defeated Black Taurus in the final to win the vacant title.

=== NJPW ===
Accomplishment	Winner(s)	Date won	Notes
New Japan Ranbo	Chase Owens, Cima, Minoru Suzuki, and Toru Yano	January 4	Last eliminated Togi Makabe to determine who would wrestle for the Provision KOPW 2022 Trophy on Night 2, which was won by Suzuki.
New Japan Cup	Zack Sabre Jr.	March 27	Defeated Tetsuya Naito in the final to win the 2022 New Japan Cup and an IWGP World Heavyweight Championship match at Hyper Battle '22, but was unsuccessful.
Best of the Super Juniors	Hiromu Takahashi	June 3	Defeated El Desperado in the final to win the 2022 Best of the Super Juniors trophy and an IWGP Junior Heavyweight Championship match on the fifth night of New Japan Road 2022 but was unsuccessful. Takahashi would become the first man to win three consecutive tournaments and the first to become a four-time winner.
Strong Openweight Tag Team Championship Tournament	Aussie Open (Mark Davis and Kyle Fletcher)	July 24 (aired August 13)	Defeated Christopher Daniels and Yuya Uemura in the final to become the inaugural champions.
G1 Climax	Kazuchika Okada	August 18	Defeated Will Ospreay in the finals to win the 2022 G1 Climax and an IWGP World Heavyweight Championship match at Wrestle Kingdom 17. He would defeat Jay White to win the title.
IWGP Women's Championship Tournament	Kairi	November 20	Defeated Mayu Iwatani in the final to become the inaugural IWGP Women's Champion.
World Tag League	Bishamon (Hirooki Goto and Yoshi-Hashi)	December 14	Defeated Aussie Open (Mark Davis and Kyle Fletcher) in the final to earn an IWGP Heavyweight Tag Team Championship match at Wrestle Kingdom 17. They would defeat FTR (Dax Harwood and Cash Wheeler) to win the titles.
Super Junior Tag League	LiYoh (Yoh and Lio Rush)	December 14	Defeated ABC (1, 2 SWEET!) (Ace Austin and Chris Bey) in the final to earn an IWGP Junior Heavyweight Tag Team Championship match at Wrestle Kingdom 17, but were unsuccessful in winning the titles.

=== Noah ===
Accomplishment	Winner(s)	Date won	Notes
N Innovation U-Cup	Noah Seiki-gun (Hajime Ohara, Junta Miyawaki, Atsushi Kotoge, and Daisuke Harada)	January 7	Defeated Kongo (Aleja, Haoh, Nioh, and Tadasuke) in the final.
GHC Tag Team Championship Tournament	Sugiura-gun (Hideki Suzuki and Takashi Sugiura)	March 13	Defeated Daiki Inaba and Kaito Kiyomiya in the final to win the vacant title.
N-1 Victory	Kaito Kiyomiya	September 3	Defeated Hideki Suzuki in the final to earn a GHC Heavyweight Championship match. He would defeat Kenoh on September 25 for the title.

=== M-Pro ===
Accomplishment	Winner(s)	Date won	Notes
Fukumen World League	Sagrada Cerezo	September 25	Defeated OSO11 in the final.

=== Zero1 ===
Accomplishment	Winner(s)	Date won	Notes
Chono Camp	Shoki Kitamura	May 4	Defeated Hiroyuki Suzuki in the final.
Fire Festival	Daisuke Sekimoto	July 31 (aired August 7)	Defeated Yoshiki Inamura in the final.
Tenkaichi Jr. Tournament	Shoki Kitamura	October 19	Defeated Tatsuhito Takaiwa in the final.
Furinkazan Tag Team Tournament	The Kubota Brothers (Hide Kubota and Yasu Kubota)	December 16	Defeated Masato Tanaka and Ryo Hoshino in the final to earn an Intercontinental Tag Team Championship. They would defeat Junya Matsunaga and Takafumi on January 1 to win the titles.

=== Stardom ===
Accomplishment	Winner(s)	Date won	Notes
Cinderella Rumble	Mei Suruga	March 27	Last eliminated Miyu Amasaki to earn a High Speed Championship match but was unsuccessful in winning the title.
Cinderella Tournament	Mirai	April 29	Defeated Koguma in the final to earn a Wonder of Stardom Championship match but was unsuccessful in winning the title.
5 Star Grand Prix	Giulia	October 1	Defeated Tam Nakano in the final to earn a World of Stardom Championship match. She would defeat Syuri on December 29 to win the title.
Moneyball Tournament	Stars (Mayu Iwatani, Hazuki & Koguma)	November 19	Defeated Donna Del Mondo (Giulia, Mai Sakurai & Thekla) in the tables, ladders, and chairs final.
Stardom Rumble	Mirai	November 20	Last eliminated Super Strong Stardom Machine to win.
IWGP Women's Championship Tournament	Kairi	November 20	Defeated Mayu Iwatani in the final to become the inaugural IWGP Women's Champion.
Goddesses of Stardom Tag League	7Upp (Nanae Takahashi & Yuu)	December 4	Defeated AphrOditE (Utami Hayashishita & Saya Kamitani) in the final to earn a Goddesses of Stardom Championship match at Dream Queendom 2. They defeated meltear (Tam Nakano and Natsupoi) to win the title.
Stardom Ranbo	Super Strong Stardom Machine and Super Strong Stardom Giant Machine	December 29	Last eliminated Kikutaro to win.

=== MLW ===
Accomplishment	Winner(s)	Date won	Notes
Battle Riot	Jacob Fatu	June 23	Last eliminated The Real1 to win an MLW World Heavyweight Championship match.

=== NWA ===
Accomplishment	Winner(s)	Date won	Notes
Team War Tournament	El Rudo and Strictly Business (Chris Adonis and Thom Latimer)	December 6, 2021 (aired February 15, 2022)	Defeated Rodney Mack and The End (Odinson and Parrow) in the final for a $30,000 cash prize.
Crockett Cup	The Briscoe Brothers (Jay Briscoe and Mark Briscoe)	March 20	Defeated The Commonwealth Connection (Doug Williams and Harry Smith) in the final for the Crockett Cup Trophy and an NWA World Tag Team Championship match on the April 26 Powerrr, but were unsuccessful.
NWA World Junior Heavyweight Championship Tournament	Homicide	March 20	Defeated Austin Aries, Colby Corino, and Darius Lockhart in the final to win the vacant title
Race to The Chase Tournament	Nick Aldis	June 13 (aired July 19)	Defeated Brian Myers, Mike Knox, and Thom Latimer in the finals for an NWA Worlds Heavyweight Championship match on Night 2 of NWA 74. However, Aldis was stripped of his number one contender's status due to his behavior on social media, and was replaced by Tyrus.
Burke invitational Gauntlet	Max The Impaler	August 27	Last eliminated Natalia Markova for the Burke Cup and an NWA World Women's Championship match on Night 2 of NWA 74, but was unsuccessful.
Queen Bee	Natalia Markova	August 28	Defeated Missa Kate, Madi Wrenkowski, KiLynn King, Jennacide, and Taya Valkyrie to be crowned "Queen Bee" of the NWA.
NWA National Championship Number One Contender's Tournament	Dak Draper	August 30 (aired October 11)	Defeated Chris Adonis and "Thrillbilly" Silas Mason in the final for an NWA National Championship match at Hard Times 3 but was unsuccessful.

=== WWE ===
Accomplishment	Winner(s)	Date won	Notes
Royal Rumble match (Women)	Ronda Rousey	January 29	Winner received their choice of a championship match for either the Raw Women's Championship or SmackDown Women's Championship at WrestleMania 38. Rousey chose to challenge Charlotte Flair for the SmackDown Women's Championship but was unsuccessful in winning the title.
Royal Rumble match (Men)	Brock Lesnar	January 29	Winner received their choice of a world championship match for either Raw's WWE Championship or SmackDown's Universal Championship at WrestleMania 38. Lesnar chose to challenge Roman Reigns for the Universal Championship. Lesnar won an Elimination Chamber match at Elimination Chamber to win the WWE Championship, making the match a title unification match, but was unsuccessful in unifying the titles.
Dusty Rhodes Tag Team Classic (Men)	The Creed Brothers (Brutus and Julius Creed)	February 15	Defeated MSK (Nash Carter and Wes Lee) in the final to win the Men's Dusty Rhodes Tag Team Classic Trophy and an NXT Tag Team Championship match. Originally set for NXT 2.0: Roadblock, The Creed Brothers were attacked in the parking lot before the match, so MSK took their place. However, The Creed Brothers attacked both MSK and champions Imperium (Fabian Aichner and Marcel Barthel), rendering the match a no contest. The three teams then competed in a three-way tag team match at NXT Stand & Deliver for the title, which was won by MSK.
Dusty Rhodes Tag Team Classic (Women)	Io Shirai and Kay Lee Ray	March 16	Defeated Dakota Kai and Wendy Choo in the final for the Women's Dusty Rhodes Tag Team Classic Trophy. However, instead of an NXT Women's Tag Team Championship match, Shirai and Ray decided to enter the NXT Women's Championship match at NXT Stand & Deliver, but neither were successful in winning the title.
André the Giant Memorial Battle Royal	Madcap Moss	April 1	Last eliminated Finn Bálor to win the André the Giant Memorial Trophy.
NXT Women's Breakout Tournament	Roxanne Perez	June 7	Defeated Tiffany Stratton in the tournament final for a championship opportunity of her choice. Perez would invoke her opportunity against Mandy Rose for the NXT Women's Championship on the July 14 episode of NXT 2.0 but was unsuccessful.
Money in the Bank ladder match (Women)	Liv Morgan	July 2	Defeated Alexa Bliss, Asuka, Becky Lynch, Lacey Evans, Raquel Rodriguez, and Shotzi in a 7-woman ladder match for a women's championship match contract. Morgan would cash in the contract later in the night on Ronda Rousey to win the SmackDown Women's Championship.
Money in the Bank ladder match (Men)	Theory	July 2	Defeated Drew McIntyre, Madcap Moss, Omos, Riddle, Sami Zayn, Seth "Freakin" Rollins, and Sheamus in an 8-man ladder match for a world championship match contract. Theory would cash in the contract on Rollins for the WWE United States Championship on the November 7 episode of Raw but was unsuccessful. This was the first instance of the contract being used for a secondary championship instead of a world championship.
NXT United Kingdom Championship Tournament	Tyler Bate	July 7 (aired September 1)	Defeated Trent Seven in the tournament final to win the vacant championship.
WWE Women's Tag Team Championship Tournament	Aliyah and Raquel Rodriguez	August 29	Defeated Damage CTRL (Dakota Kai and Iyo Sky) in the tournament final to win the vacant championship.
SmackDown World Cup	Ricochet	December 2	Defeated Santos Escobar in the tournament final to win the SmackDown World Cup Trophy and an Intercontinental Championship match on the December 16 episode of SmackDown, but was unsuccessful in winning the title.
Iron Survivor Challenge (Women)	Roxanne Perez	December 10	Defeated Cora Jade, Indi Hartwell, Kiana James, and Zoey Stark to earn an NXT Women's Championship match. She would defeat Mandy Rose to win the title on the December 13 episode of NXT.
Iron Survivor Challenge (Men)	Grayson Waller	December 10	Defeated Axiom, Carmelo Hayes, JD McDonagh, and Joe Gacy to earn an NXT Championship match at NXT: New Year's Evil. He challenged Bron Breakker for the title but was unsuccessful.

== Title changes ==
=== AJPW ===
Triple Crown Heavyweight Championship
Incoming champion – Vacant
Date	Winner	Event/Show	Note(s)
January 23	Kento Miyahara	New Year Wars; Night 3	Defeated Ryuki Honda in a tournament final to win the vacant title.
June 19	Jake Lee	Champions Night 4 ~ 50th Anniversary Tour	
July 14	Suwama	Summer Action Series 2022; Night 2	
September 18	Kento Miyahara	AJPW 50th Anniversary	

World Tag Team Championship
Incoming champions – Runaway Suplex (Suwama & Shotaro Ashino)
Date	Winner	Event/Show	Note(s)
May 14	Twin Towers (Kohei Sato and Shuji Ishikawa)	50th Anniversary Tour Sapporo 2 Days; Night 1	
June 19	Gungnir of Anarchy (Ryuki Honda and Shotaro Ashino)	Champions Night 4 ~ 50th Anniversary Tour	
October 23	Voodoo Murders (Kono and Suwama)	Raising An Army Memorial Series 2022; Night 2	

World Junior Heavyweight Championship
Incoming champion – Super Crazy
Date	Winner	Event/Show	Note(s)
January 3	Sugi	New Year Wars; Night 2	
February 23	Hikaru Sato	Dream Power Series; Night 6	
June 19	Tiger Mask IV	Champions Night 4 ~ 50th Anniversary Tour	
September 18	Atsuki Aoyagi	AJPW 50th Anniversary	

All Asia Tag Team Championship
Incoming champions – Strong Hearts (T-Hawk and El Lindaman)
Date	Winner	Event/Show	Note(s)
January 2	TOTAL ECLIPSE (Hokuto Omori and Yusuke Kodama)	New Year Wars; Night 1	
July 14	Voodoo Murders (Minoru and Toshizo)	Summer Action Series 2022; Night 2	
September 18	Dan Tamura and Hikaru Sato	AJPW 50th Anniversary	
October 30	Tajiri and Yoshitatsu	Raising An Army Memorial Series 2022; Night 3	
November 27	Gungnir of Anarchy (Masao Hanahata and Yusuke Kodama)	Real World Tag League 2022; Night 6	Defeated Yoshitatsu in a handicap match to win the title after Tajiri was unable to defend them.
December 7	Masao Inoue and Takao Omori	Real World Tag League 2022; Night 8	Four-way tag team match also involving ATM and Black Menso-re, and Tajiri and Yoshitatsu.

UWA World Middleweight Championship
Incoming champion – Kyu Mogami
No title changes.

Gaora TV Championship
Incoming champion – Shigehiro Irie
Date	Winner	Event/Show	Note(s)
June 7	Izanagi	Dynamite Series 2022; Night 1	
June 19	Toshizo	Champions Night 4 ~ 50th Anniversary Tour	Four-way ladder match also involving Black Menso-re and Yusuke Kodama.

AJPW TV Six-Man Tag Team Championship
Incoming champions – Yoshitatsu, Seigo Tachibana and Takayuki Ueki
Date	Winner	Event/Show	Note(s)
June 22	Vacated	—	The title was vacated due to a "difference of direction".

=== 2AW ===
2AW Openweight Championship
Incoming champion – Shigehiro Irie
Date	Winner	Event/Show	Note(s)
March 21	Kengo Mashimo	Grand Slam in Korakuen Hall	
December 25	Ayato Yoshida	Grand Slam in TKP Garden City Chiba ~ Final Event of the Year	

2AW Tag Team Championship
Incoming champions – The Rule (Ayato Yoshida & The Andrew King Takuma)
Date	Winner	Event/Show	Note(s)
February 23	Voodoo Murders (Chris Vice and Yoshikazu Yokoyama)	Infinity ~ 2022 Winter	
April 10	The Rule (Ayato Yoshida and Excilio)	Osu Premium Show ZERO1 20th & 21st Anniversary Pro Wrestling	Promoted by Pro Wrestling Zero1.
September 11 (aired September 17)	Koen (Takuro Niki and Tatsuya Hanami)	Grand Slam in Korokuen Hall	

AIWF World Heavyweight Championship
Incoming champion – Kevin Phoenix
No title changes.

Independent World Junior Heavyweight Championship
Incoming champion – Arata
No title changes.

UWA World Tag Team Championship
Incoming champions – Jinsei Shinzaki and The Great Sasuke
No title changes.

FMW/WEW Hardcore Tag Team Championship
Incoming champions – Kunio Toshima and Yuma Aoyagi
No title changes.

=== AAA ===
AAA Mega Championship
Incoming champion – El Hijo del Vikingo
No title changes.

AAA World Cruiserweight Championship
Incoming champion – Laredo Kid
Date	Winner	Event/Show	Note(s)
June 18	Fénix	Triplemanía XXX: Tijuana	Five-way match also involving Taurus, Bandido, and El Hijo del Vikingo. Taurus' AAA Latin American Championship was also on the line.

AAA World Mini-Estrella Championship
Incoming champion – Dinastía
November 5	Vacant	—	Dinastía vacated the title after leaving AAA.
November 5	Deactivated	—	The championship was abandoned.

AAA Latin American Championship
Incoming champion – Taurus
Date	Winner	Event/Show	Note(s)
June 18	Fénix	Triplemanía XXX: Tijuana	Five-way match also involving Laredo Kid, Bandido, and El Hijo del Vikingo. Kid's AAA World Cruiserweight Championship was also on the line.

AAA Reina de Reinas Championship
Incoming champion – Deonna Purrazzo
Date	Winner	Event/Show	Note(s)
April 23	Taya Valkyrie	Impact Wrestling Rebellion	First time the title changed on an Impact Wrestling show.

AAA World Tag Team Championship
Incoming champions – FTR (Cash Wheeler and Dax Harwood)
Date	Winner	Event/Show	Note(s)
December 28	Los Hermanos Lee (Dragon Lee and Dralístico)	Noche de Campeones	
December 28	Vacated	Noche de Campeones	Los Hermanos Lee vacated the titles after Lee announced he signed with WWE.

AAA World Mixed Tag Team Championship
Incoming champions – Los Vipers (Arez and Chik Tormenta)
Date	Winner	Event/Show	Note(s)
April 30	Jericho Appreciation Society (Sammy Guevara and Tay Conti / Tay Melo)	Triplemanía XXX: Monterrey	Four-way mixed tag team match also involving Maravilla and Látigo, and Sexy Star II and Komander. On August 12, Tay Conti's ring name was changed to Tay Melo.
December 28	Vacated	Noche de Campeones	Konnan stripped Guevara and Melo of the titles after no showing several events.
December 28	Abismo Negro Jr. and Lady Flammer	Noche de Campeones	Defeated the teams of Komander and Sexy Star II and Octagón Jr. and Lady Shani in a three-way tag team match to win the vacant title.

AAA World Trios Championship
Incoming champions – Los Mercenarios (La Hiedra, Rey Escorpión, Taurus, and Texano Jr.)
Date	Winner	Event/Show	Note(s)
March 3	La Empresa (DMT Azul, Puma King, and Sam Adonis)	Gira Aniversario XXX	
August 5	Nueva Generación Dinamita (El Cuatrero, Forastero, and Sansón)	Verano de Escándalo	

La Leyenda Azul Blue Demon Championship
(Title created)
Date	Winner	Event/Show	Note(s)
December 28	Arez	Noche de Campeones	Defeated Taurus and Villano III Jr. to become the inaugural champion.

=== AEW ===
AEW World Championship
Incoming champion – Adam Page
Date	Winner	Event/Show	Note(s)
May 29	CM Punk	Double or Nothing	
June 26	Jon Moxley	AEW x NJPW: Forbidden Door	Lineal champion CM Punk was originally scheduled to defend the AEW World Championship against Hiroshi Tanahashi at this event; however, Punk legitimately broke his foot and required surgery. Instead of relinquishing the title, it was decided that there would be an interim champion until Punk's return. Moxley defeated Tanahashi to determine the interim champion.
August 24	Jon Moxley	Dynamite	Defeated lineal champion CM Punk to determine the undisputed AEW World Champion. This is officially recognized as the end of Punk's reign and the start of Moxley's.
September 4	CM Punk	All Out	
September 7	Vacated	Dynamite	CM Punk was stripped of the title after being suspended by AEW president Tony Khan due to the legitimate physical altercation that happened following the All Out media scrum.
September 21	Jon Moxley	Dynamite: Grand Slam	Defeated Bryan Danielson in a tournament final for the vacant championship.
November 19	MJF	Full Gear	This was MJF's Casino Poker Chip cash-in match.

AEW Women's World Championship
Incoming champion – Dr. Britt Baker, D.M.D.
Date	Winner	Event/Show	Note(s)
March 16	Thunder Rosa	Dynamite: St. Patrick's Day Slam	Steel Cage match.
September 4	Vacated	All Out	Thunder Rosa was originally scheduled to defend the lineal championship at this event, but due to a back injury incurred in late August, an interim champion was crowned until her return. However, on November 23, 2022, Rosa relinquished the championship, with the subsequent interim reigns retroactively becoming official reigns.
September 4	Toni Storm	All Out	Lineal champion Thunder Rosa was originally scheduled to defend the title against Storm at the event, but was pulled due to suffering an injury incurred in late August. Storm instead faced and defeated Dr. Britt Baker, D.M.D., Jamie Hayter, and Hikaru Shida in a four-way match to become the interim champion. On November 23, 2022, Rosa relinquished the lineal championship and Storm's interim reign was retroactively made an official reign.
November 19	Jamie Hayter	Full Gear	Hayter originally defeated Toni Storm for the interim championship, but on November 23, 2022, lineal champion Thunder Rosa relinquished her title, thus Hayter was made the official champion by default.

AEW All-Atlantic Championship
(Title created)
Date	Winner	Event/Show	Note(s)
June 26	Pac	AEW x NJPW: Forbidden Door	Defeated Clark Connors, Miro, and Malakai Black in a four-way match to become the inaugural champion.
October 12	Orange Cassidy	Dynamite	

AEW World Tag Team Championship
Incoming champions – The Lucha Brothers (Penta El Zero Miedo and Rey Fénix)
Date	Winner	Event/Show	Note(s)
January 5	Jurassic Express (Jungle Boy and Luchasaurus)	Dynamite	
June 15	The Young Bucks (Matt Jackson and Nick Jackson)	Dynamite: Road Rager	Ladder match
July 13	Swerve In Our Glory (Keith Lee and Swerve Strickland)	Dynamite: Fyter Fest; Night 1	Three-way tag team match also involving Team Taz (Ricky Starks and Powerhouse Hobbs).
September 21	The Acclaimed (Anthony Bowens and Max Caster)	Dynamite: Grand Slam	

AEW World Trios Championship
(Title created)
Date	Winner	Event/Show	Note(s)
September 4	The Elite (Kenny Omega, Matt Jackson, and Nick Jackson)	All Out	Defeated "Hangman" Adam Page and The Dark Order (Alex Reynolds and John Silver) in the tournament final to become the inaugural champions.
September 7	Vacated	Dynamite	The Elite were stripped of the title after being suspended by AEW president Tony Khan due to the legitimate physical altercation that happened following the All Out post-event media scrum.
September 7	Death Triangle (Pac, Penta El Zero Miedo, and Rey Fénix))	Dynamite	Defeated Best Friends (Chuck Taylor, Trent Beretta, and Orange Cassidy) to win the vacant championship.

AEW TNT Championship
Incoming champion – Cody Rhodes
Date	Winner	Event/Show	Note(s)
January 8	Sammy Guevara	Battle of the Belts I	Guevara was originally scheduled to face Cody Rhodes for the title, however, after Rhodes came into contact with family who had tested positive for COVID-19, Rhodes was pulled from the match, and Guevara instead faced Dustin Rhodes and defeated him to become the interim TNT Champion. This reign is not included in AEW's official title history.
January 26	Sammy Guevara	Dynamite: Beach Break	Defeated lineal champion Cody Rhodes in a ladder match to determine the undisputed TNT Champion. This is officially recognized as the end of Rhodes' reign and the start of Guevara's.
March 9	Scorpio Sky	Dynamite	
April 15 (aired April 16)	Sammy Guevara	Battle of the Belts II	
April 27	Scorpio Sky	Dynamite	Ladder match.
July 6	Wardlow	Dynamite	Street fight.
November 19	Samoa Joe	Full Gear	Three-way match, also involving Powerhouse Hobbs, who Joe submitted.

AEW TBS Championship
(Title created)
Date	Winner	Event/Show	Note(s)
January 5	Jade Cargill	Dynamite	Defeated Ruby Soho in a tournament final to become the inaugural champion.

FTW Championship
Incoming champion – Ricky Starks
Title not officially sanctioned by AEW.
Date	Winner	Event/Show	Note(s)
July 27	Hook	Dynamite: Fight for the Fallen	

=== BJW ===
BJW Deathmatch Heavyweight Championship
Incoming champion – Yuko Miyamoto
Date	Winner	Event/Show	Note(s)
May 5	Drew Parker	Big Japan Welcome Back	Scaffold and Alpha Deathmatch.
May 13	Vacated	—	
August 28 (aired September 4)	Hideyoshi Kamitani	Death Match X 2022	Defeated Abdullah Kobayashi in a Fluorescent Lighttubes Jungle Deathmatch final of the Bloody Musou Tournament to win the vacant title.

BJW World Strong Heavyweight Championship
Incoming champion – Takuya Nomura
Date	Winner	Event/Show	Note(s)
January 2	Yuji Okabayashi	New Year 2022	

BJW Tag Team Championship
Incoming champions – Strong BJ (Daisuke Sekimoto and Yuji Okabayashi)
Date	Winner	Event/Show	Note(s)
March 6 (aired March 12)	Okami (Daichi Hashimoto and Hideyoshi Kamitani)	BJW	
May 5	Astronauts (Fuminori Abe and Takuya Nomura)	Big Japan Welcome Back	

BJW Junior Heavyweight Championship
Incoming champion – Kota Sekifuda
No title changes.

Yokohama Shopping Street 6-Man Tag Team Championship
Incoming champions – Chicharito Shoki, Yasufumi Nakanoue, and Yuji Okabayashi
No title changes.

=== The Crash ===
The Crash Heavyweight Championship
Incoming champion – El Hijo del Vikingo
Date	Winner	Event/Show	Note(s)
March 18	Vacated	—	Vikingo vacated the title due to an injury.
March 18	Cinta de Oro	The Crash	Defeated Lince Dorado and Penta El Zero M in a three-way match to win the vacant title.
July 1	L.A. Park	The Crash	Four-way match also involving El Texano Jr. and Pierroth Jr..

The Crash Cruiserweight Championship
Incoming champion – Dinámico
Date	Winner	Event/Show	Note(s)
March 18	Vacated	—	
March 18	Black Destiny	The Crash	Defeated Black Danger, Septimo Dragon, and Skalibur in a four-way match to win the vacant title.

The Crash Women's Championship
Incoming champion – Lady Flammer
Date	Winner	Event/Show	Note(s)
January 28	Sexy Star	The Crash	Three-way match also involving Lady Maravilla.

The Crash Junior Championship
Incoming champion – Toto
Date	Winner	Event/Show	Note(s)
July 1	Proximo	The Crash	

The Crash Tag Team Championship
Incoming champions – La Rebelión Amarilla (Bestia 666 and Mecha Wolf)
Date	Winner	Event/Show	Note(s)
September 9	Vacated	—	
September 9	Los Hermanos Lee (Dragon Lee and Dralístico)	The Crash	Defeated Sangre Texano (Texano Jr. and Super Nova) and Los Parks (L.A. Park and L.A. Park Jr.) to win the vacant title.

=== CMLL ===
CMLL World Heavyweight Championship
Incoming champion – Hechicero
Date	Winner	Event/Show	Note(s)
November 7	Gran Guerrero	Lunes Arena Puebla	

CMLL World Light Heavyweight Championship
Incoming champion – Niebla Roja
Date	Winner	Event/Show	Note(s)
July 15	El Bárbaro Cavernario	Super Viernes	

CMLL World Middleweight Championship
Incoming champion – Soberano, Jr.
Date	Winner	Event/Show	Note(s)
April 2	Dragón Rojo Jr.	79. Aniversario Arena Coliseo	

CMLL World Welterweight Championship
Incoming champion – Titán
No title changes.

CMLL World Lightweight Championship
Incoming champion – Vacant
Date	Winner	Event/Show	Note(s)
March 15	Stigma	Martes de Arena Mexico	Defeated Suicida in a tournament final to win the vacant title.

CMLL World Micro-Estrellas Championship
Incoming champion – Chamuel
Date	Winner	Event/Show	Note(s)
October 30	Micro Gemelo Diablo I	Domingos Arena Mexico	

CMLL World Mini-Estrella Championship
Incoming champion – Shockercito
Date	Winner	Event/Show	Note(s)
February 20	Mercurio	Domingos Arena Mexico	

CMLL World Tag Team Championship
Incoming champions – Titán and Volador Jr.
Date	Winner	Event/Show	Note(s)
January 23	Los Nuevos Ingobernables (Ángel de Oro & Niebla Roja)	Domingos Arena Mexico	

CMLL World Trios Championship
Incoming champions – Nueva Generacion Dinamita (El Cuatrero, Forastero, and Sansón)
Date	Winner	Event/Show	Note(s)
March 18	Vacated	—	
March 19	Los Malditos (El Sagrado, Gemelo Diablo I, and Gemelo Diablo II)	Homenaje A Dos Leyendas	Defeated Atlantis and Los Guerreros Laguneros (Gran Guerrero and Último Guerrero) in a tournament final to win the vacant title.
September 30	Los Infernales (Euforia, Mephisto, and Hechicero)	Noche de Campeones 2022	

CMLL World Women's Championship
Incoming champion – Princesa Sugehit
No title changes.

CMLL Japan Women's Championship
Incoming champion – Dalys la Caribeña
No title changes.

CMLL Arena Coliseo Tag Team Championship
Incoming champions – Vacant
Date	Winner	Event/Show	Note(s)
April 2	Hombre Bala Jr. and Robin	79 Aniversario Arena Coliseo	Defeated La Ola Negra (Akuma and Espanto Jr.) to win the vacant championship

NWA World Historic Light Heavyweight Championship
Incoming champion – Stuka Jr.
No title changes.

NWA World Historic Middleweight Championship
Incoming champion – Místico
No title changes.

NWA World Historic Welterweight Championship
Incoming champion – Volador Jr.
No title changes.

Mexican National Heavyweight Championship
Incoming champion – Vacant
Date	Winner	Event/Show	Note(s)
March 4	Euforia	Super Viernes	Defeated Gran Guerrero in a tournament final to win the vacant title.
April 1	El Terrible	Super Viernes	
October 10	El Sagrado	Lunes Arena Puebla	

Mexican National Light Heavyweight Championship
Incoming champion – Ángel de Oro
No title changes.

Mexican National Welterweight Championship
Incoming champion – Vacant
Date	Winner	Event/Show	Note(s)
June 24	Magia Blanca	Super Viernes	Defeated Angel Rebelde, Astral, Diamond, Inquisidor, Príncipe Daniel, Rey Cometa, Rey Samuray, Suicida, and Perverso in a cibernetico match to win the vacant title.

Mexican National Middleweight Championship
Incoming champion – Templario
No title changes.

Mexican National Lightweight Championship
Incoming champion – Panterita del Ring Jr.
No title changes.

Mexican National Tag Team Championship
Incoming champions – Felino Jr. and Pólvora
Date	Winner	Event/Show	Note(s)
March 20	OneAtos (Esfinge and Fugaz)	Domingos Arena Mexico	

Mexican National Trios Championship
Incoming champions – Los Cancerberos del Infierno (Virus, Cancerbero, and Raziel)
Date	Winner	Event/Show	Note(s)
May 11	Vacated	—	
May 27	Atrapasuenos (Dulce Gardenia, Espíritu Negro, and Rey Cometa)	Homenaje A Dos Leyendas	Defeated Los Depredadores (Magia Blanca, Magnus, and Rugido), OneAtos (Esfinge, Fugaz, and Star Black), and La Fuerza Poblana (Arkalis, Guerrero Maya Jr., and Stigma) in a four way tag team elimination match to win the vacant title.

Mexican National Women's Championship
Incoming champion – Dark Silueta
No title changes.

Mexican National Women's Tag Team Championship
Incoming champions – La Jarochita and Lluvia
No title changes.

=== DG ===
Open the Dream Gate Championship
Incoming champion – Kai
Date	Winner	Event/Show	Note(s)
July 30	Yuki Yoshioka	Kobe World 2022 ~ Último Dragón 35th Anniversary	

Open the Brave Gate Championship
Incoming champion – SB Kento
Date	Winner	Event/Show	Note(s)
January 12	Dragon Dia	Open The New Year Gate; Night 4	
July 30	H.Y.O	Kobe World 2022 ~ Último Dragón 35th Anniversary	
December 25	Minorita	The Final Gate	

Open the Twin Gate Championship
Incoming champions – R.E.D. (SB Kento and H.Y.O)
Date	Winner	Event/Show	Note(s)
January 13	D'courage (Dragon Dia and Yuki Yoshioka)	Open The New Year Gate; Night 5	
May 5	Z-Brats (Diamante and Shun Skywalker)	Dead Or Alive 2022	
July 30	Kung Fu Masters (Jacky "Funky" Kamei and Jason Lee)	Kobe World 2022 ~ Ultimo Dragon 35th Anniversary	
September 19	D'courage (Dragon Dia and Madoka Kikuta)	Dangerous Gate 2022	
December 2	Z-Brats (BxB Hulk and Kai)	Fantastic Gate 2022; Night 1	
December 4	Natural Vibes (Big Boss Shimizu and Kzy)	Fantastic Gate 2022; Night 3	

Open the Triangle Gate Championship
Incoming champions – MASQUERADE (Jason Lee, Kota Minoura, and Shun Skywalker)
Date	Winner	Event/Show	Note(s)
January 12	R.E.D. (Eita, Kaito Ishida, and H.Y.O)	Open The New Year Gate; Night 4	
January 12	Vacated	Open The New Year Gate; Night 4	Vacated when Eita and Ishida were kicked out of R.E.D.
February 20	Natural Vibes (Kzy, U-T, and Jacky "Funky" Kamei)	Truth Gate; Night 8 (Evening Show)	Defeated Z-Brats (H.Y.O, BxB Hulk, and Shun Skywalker) in a tournament final to win the vacant title.
March 5	GOLD CLASS (Naruki Doi, Kaito Ishida, and Kota Minoura)	Champion Gate in Osaka; Night 1	Minorita would often replace of his partners to defend the title via the Freebird Rule, but was not officially recognized as champion.
May 5	Los Perros del Mal de Japón (Eita, Kotaro Suzuki, and Nosawa Rongai)	Dead Or Alive 2022	
June 7	Stinger (Seiki Yoshioka, Yoshinari Ogawa, and Yuya Susumu)	Noah Star Navigation 2022; Night 1	
June 8	Momo no Seishun Tag (Yo-Hey, Atsushi Kotoge, and Daisuke Harada)	Noah Star Navigation 2022; Night 2	
June 23	Vacated	Noah N Innovation	
June 23	Los Perros del Mal de Japón (Eita, Kotaro Suzuki, and Nosawa Rongai)	Noah N Innovation	Defeated Extreme Tiger and Momo no Seishun Tag (Yo-Hey and Atsushi Kotoge) for the vacant title.
July 30	M3K (Masaaki Mochizuki, Mochizuki Jr., and Susuma Mochizuki)	Kobe World 2022 ~ Ultimo Dragon 35th Anniversary	
November 12	Z-Brats (Ishin Iihashi/Ishin, Kai, and Shun Skywalker)	Gate of Destiny 2022	

=== Gleat ===
G-Rex Championship
(Title created)
Date	Winner	Event/Show	Note(s)
February 22	El Lindaman	G Prowrestling Ver. 18	Defeated Hayato Tamura in the finals of the First Champion Decision tournament to become the inaugural champion.

G-Infinity Championship
(Title created)
Date	Winner	Event/Show	Note(s)
August 24	Bulk Orchestra (Kazma Sakamoto and Ryuichi Kawakami)	G Prowrestling Ver. 31	Defeated Strong Hearts (Cima and T-Hawk) in the finals of the First Champion Decision tournament to become the inaugural champions.
September 4 (aired September 6)	Bulk Orchestra (Check Shimatani and Hayato Tamura)	G Prowrestling Ver. 32	
October 30	Stong Hearts (Shigehiro Irie and T-Hawk)	G Prowrestling Ver. 37	Bulk Orchestra was unable to defend the title at the event dur to Tamura suffering an injury. Strong Hearts defeated Coelacanths (Cima and Kaz Hayashi) to become the interim champions. On November 19, Bulk Orchestra defeated Strong Hearts and the team of Masato Kamino and Takanori Ito in a three-way tag team match to become the undisputed champions.

=== GanPro ===
Spirit of Ganbare World Openweight Championship
Incoming champion - Tatsuhito Takaiwa
Date	Winner	Event/Show	Note(s)
May 3	Yumehito Imanari	Love Phantom 2022	
September 3	Hartley Jackson	Punch Drunk Love 2022	
December 27	Mizuki Watase	Giri Giri Chop!	

=== TJPW ===
Princess of Princess Championship
Incoming champion – Miyu Yamashita
Date	Winner	Event/Show	Note(s)
March 19	Shoko Nakajima	Grand Princess '22	
October 9	Yuka Sakazaki	Wrestle Princess 3	

Princess Tag Team Championship
Incoming champions – Magical Sugar Rabbits (Mizuki and Yuka Sakazaki)
Date	Winner	Event/Show	Note(s)
July 9	Reiwa AA Cannon (Saki Akai and Yuki Arai)	Summer Sun Princess '22	

International Princess Championship
Incoming champion – Hikari Noa
Date	Winner	Event/Show	Note(s)
January 4	Maki Itoh	Tokyo Joshi Pro '22	
July 9	Alex Windsor	Summer Sun Princess '22	
October 9	Miu Watanabe	Wrestle Princess 3	

=== GCW ===
GCW World Championship
Incoming champion - Jon Moxley
Date	Winner	Event/Show	Note(s)
October 8	Nick Gage	Fight Club; Night 1	Title vs. Career match.

GCW Ultraviolent Championship
Incoming champion - Alex Colon
Date	Winner	Event/Show	Note(s)
March 31	John Wayne Murdoch	Joey Janela's Spring Break 6 Part 1	
June 5	Alex Colon	Cage of Survival	Cage of Survival match
August 13	Rina Yamashita	Homecoming Weekend 2022; Night 1	Deathmatch

GCW Tag Team Championship
Incoming champions - The Briscoe Brothers (Jay Briscoe and Mark Briscoe)
Date	Winner	Event/Show	Note(s)
January 23	The H8 Club (Matt Tremont and Nick Gage)	The Wrld on GCW	
March 31	The Briscoe Brothers (Jay Briscoe and Mark Briscoe)	Joey Janela's Spring Break 6 Part 1	Three-way tag team match also involving The Second Gear Crew (Mance Warner and Matthew Justice). SLADE replace Tremont.
April 9	BUSSY (Allie Katch and Effy)	Paranoid	
July 29	Los Macizos (Ciclope and Miedo Extremo)	The People vs. GCW	Three-way tag team match also involving The Second Gear Crew (Mance Warner and Matthew Justice).
August 13	The Briscoe Brothers (Jay Briscoe and Mark Briscoe)	Homecoming Weekend 2022; Night 1	Deathmatch
September 3	The Mega Bastards (Alex Colon and John Wayne Murdoch)	The Art of War Games	WarGames match also involving The Second Gear Crew (Mance Warner and Matthew Justice), Los Macizos (Ciclope and Miedo Extremo), and BUSSY (Allie Katch and Effy).
October 22	Los Macizos (Ciclope and Miedo Extremo)	Drop Dead	DLC match also involving The Second Gear Crew (Mance Warner and Matthew Justice).

GCW Extreme Championship
Incoming champion - PCO
Date	Winner	Event/Show	Note(s)
January 15	AJ Gray	Say You Will	
July 29	Cole Radrick	The People vs. GCW	Six-way Scramble match also involving Axton Ray, The Grim Reefer, Marko Stunt and Shane Mercer.
October 9	Joey Janela	Fight Club; Night 9	Title vs. title match also for Janela's DDT Extreme Championship.

=== DDT ===
KO-D Openweight Championship
Incoming champion – Konosuke Takeshita
Date	Winner	Event/Show	Note(s)
March 20	Tetsuya Endo	Judgement 2022: DDT 25th Anniversary	
June 14	Vacated	—	Endo vacated the title after suffering a concussion.
July 3	Kazusada Higuchi	King of DDT 2022 Final	Defeated Naomi Yoshimura in the finals of the King of DDT Tournament to win the vacant title.

DDT Universal Championship
Incoming champion – Daisuke Sasaki
Date	Winner	Event/Show	Note(s)
March 20	Mao	Judgement 2022: DDT 25th Anniversary	Three-way match involving Jun Kasai
June 1	Masahiro Takanashi	What Are You Doing? 2022	
August 20	Yuki Ueno	Wrestle Peter Pan 2022	

DDT Extreme Championship
Incoming champion – Shinya Aoki
Date	Winner	Event/Show	Note(s)
February 14	Yuki "Sexy" Iino	DDT Free February: Ultimate Tag League 2022 in Shinjuku!!	Turkish Oil Wrestling Rules match. Iino won by Count Out
July 16 (aired July 19)	Akito	Summer Vacation Tour 2022 In Nagoya	Handicap match against Pheremones (Iino, Danshoku "Dandy" Dino, and Yumehito "Fantastic" Imanari). Sanshiro Takagi served as special guest referee.
August 14	Joey Janela	Road TO Peter Pan 2022 In Korakuen Hall ~ Lets Shout!	Fluorescent Lighttube IPPON Deathmatch.
December 4	Jun Akiyama	D-Oh Grand Prix 2022 The Final	Tables, ladders, and chairs match.

KO-D Tag Team Championship
Incoming champions – Disaster Box (Harashima and Naomi Yoshimura)
Date	Winner	Event/Show	Note(s)
January 3	Vacated		Disaster Box vacated the title before the Ultimate Tag League.
February 27	Disaster Box (Harashima and Naomi Yoshimura)	2022 Ultimate Tag League Finals	Defeated The 37Kamiina (Konosuke Takeshita and Shunma Katsumata) in the finals of the Ultimate Tag League to win the vacant title.
March 20	Calamari Drunken Kings (Chris Brookes and Masahiro Takanashi)	Judgement 2022: DDT 25th Anniversary	
May 22	Asuka and Mao	Audience 2022	
July 24	Harimao (Kazusada Higuchi and Naomi Yoshimura)	Summer Vacation 2022	
November 22	Vacated	—	Vacated after Yoshimura suffered an injury.

KO-D 6-Man Tag Team Championship
Incoming champions – Pheromones (Danshoku "Dandy" Dino, Yuki "Sexy" Iino and Yumehito "Fantastic" Imanari)
Date	Winner	Event/Show	Note(s)
April 10	DAMNATION T.A. (Daisuke Sasaki, Minoru Fujita, and MJ Paul)	April Fool	
April 21	Vacated	—	Vacated after Fujita suffered an injury.
May 22	DAMNATION T.A. (Daisuke Sasaki, MJ Paul, and Kanon)	Audience 2022	Defeated Eruption (Yukio Sakaguchi, Kazusada Higuchi, and Hideki Okatani) in a tournament final to win the vacant title.
October 8	Omega (Makoto Oishi, Shiori Asahi, and Yuji Hino)	DDT x Only We Get Alive 2022 Tour In Chiba	
November 12	Naruki Doi and Disaster Box (Kazuki Hirata and Toru Owashi)	D-Oh Grand Prix 2022 in Osaka	
December 29	Burning (Tetsuya Endo, Kotaro Suzuki, and Yusuke Okada)	Never Mind	

KO-D 8-Man Tag Team Championship
Incoming champions – Antonio Honda, Yoshihiko, and DISASTER BOX (Toru Owashi and Kazuki Hirata)
On January 3, the title was renamed the KO-D 10-Man Tag Team Championship.
Date	Winner	Event/Show	Note(s)
March 20	DDT Legend Army (Poison Sawada Julie, Gentaro, Takashi Sasaki, Misaki and Thanomsak Toba)	Judgement 2022: DDT 25th Anniversary	5-on-4 handicap match
June 25	The37Kamiina (Mao, Shinya Aoki, Shunma Katsumata, Toi Kojima, and Yuki Ueno)	Dramatic Dream Tour 2022 In Yokohama	

O-40 Championship
Incoming champion – Toru Owashi
Date	Winner	Event/Show	Note(s)
September 2	Vacated	—	Owashi vacated the title to focus on his upcoming KO-D Tag Team Championship match.

Ironman Heavymetalweight Championship
Incoming champion – Toru Owashi
Date	Winner	Event/Show	Note(s)
January 7	Mao	DDT Free	
February 6	100,000 subscribers to the official YouTube channel	Ultimate Tag League 2022 in Numazu!!	DDT Pro-Wrestling celebrated the milestone of 100,000 YouTube subscribers. The tablet on which this was shown pinned Mao and all the hundred thousand subscribers were considered champions. Took place at ringside.
February 6	Toru Owashi	Ultimate Tag League 2022 in Numazu!!	Took place at ringside.
February 14	Antonio Honda	DDT Free February: Ultimate Tag League 2022 in Shinjuku!!	Five-way two-minute time-limit scramble match also involving Danshoku "Dandy" Dino, Masahiro Takanashi and Shunma Katsumata.
February 14	Danshoku "Dandy" Dino	DDT Free February: Ultimate Tag League 2022 in Shinjuku!!	Took place in the same scramble match.
February 14	Masahiro Takanashi	DDT Free February: Ultimate Tag League 2022 in Shinjuku!!	Took place in the same scramble match.
February 14	Toru Owashi	DDT Free February: Ultimate Tag League 2022 in Shinjuku!!	Took place in the same scramble match.
February 14	Antonio Honda	DDT Free February: Ultimate Tag League 2022 in Shinjuku!!	Took place in the same scramble match.
February 14	Danshoku "Dandy" Dino	DDT Free February: Ultimate Tag League 2022 in Shinjuku!!	Took place in the same scramble match.
February 14	Masahiro Takanashi	DDT Free February: Ultimate Tag League 2022 in Shinjuku!!	Took place in the same scramble match.
February 14	Foot massage mat	DDT Free February: Ultimate Tag League 2022 in Shinjuku!!	Took place in the same scramble match.
February 14	Antonio Honda	DDT Free February: Ultimate Tag League 2022 in Shinjuku!!	Took place in the same scramble match.
February 14	Toru Owashi	DDT Free February: Ultimate Tag League 2022 in Shinjuku!!	Took place in the same scramble match.
February 14	Masahiro Takanashi	DDT Free February: Ultimate Tag League 2022 in Shinjuku!!	Took place in the same scramble match.
February 14	Shunma Katsumata	DDT Free February: Ultimate Tag League 2022 in Shinjuku!!	Took place in the same scramble match.
February 14	Danshoku "Dandy" Dino	DDT Free February: Ultimate Tag League 2022 in Shinjuku!!	Took place in the same scramble match.
February 14	Antonio Honda	DDT Free February: Ultimate Tag League 2022 in Shinjuku!!	Took place in the same scramble match. Honda succeeded in defending the title for two full minutes to win the match.
February 14	Lingling	DDT Free February: Ultimate Tag League 2022 in Shinjuku!!	Shook Honda's hand and crushed it to become the new champion. Lingling is part of the idol band Bish.
March 25	Apple	Universe Bible	Took place during the final episode of Abema's Universe Bible. Lingling attempted to crush an apple with her hand but eventually "gave up".
March 25	Antonio Honda	Universe Bible	Took place during the final episode of Abema's Universe Bible. Honda pinned the apple to win the title.
March 27	Shinichiro Kawamatsu	Day Dream Believer 2022	YouTuber and Tokyo Metropolitan Assemblyman. Kawamatsu pinned Antonio Honda after he had just successfully defended the title against Pokotan.
June 1	Kazuki Hirata	What Are You Doing? 2022	This was an Ironman survival gauntlet battle royal also involving Nobutatsu Suzuki, Pokotan, Thanomsak Toba, Antonio Honda, and Toru Owashi. Hirata eliminated Kawamatsu to become the new champion.
June 1	Toru Owashi	What Are You Doing? 2022	Took place in the same battle royal. Owashi became champions after Hirata and Honda simultaneously eliminated each other.
September 2	Vacated		Owashi vacated the title to focus on his upcoming KO-D Tag Team Championship match.
September 10	Toru Owashi	Konosuke Takeshita 10th Anniversary ~ Nishinari Bay Blues ~	Won a Staggered Entry Battle Royal to win the vacant title.
September 10	Kazuki Hirata	Konosuke Takeshita 10th Anniversary ~ Nishinari Bay Blues ~	Took place after the battle royal.
September 10	Keiko Takeshita	Konosuke Takeshita 10th Anniversary ~ Nishinari Bay Blues ~	The mother of Konosuke Takeshita. Took place after the battle royal.
November 12	Shunma Katsumata	D-Oh Grand Prix 2022 in Osaka	
November 13	Yukio Sakaguchi	D-Oh Grand Prix 2022 in Kyoto	Six-person intergender tag team match where Sakaguchi, Harashima, and Saki Akai defeated Katsumata, Yuki Ueno, and Aja Kong. Sakaguchi pinned Katsumata to win the title.
November 13	Saki Akai	D-Oh Grand Prix 2022 in Kyoto	Pinned Sakaguchi after the match.
November 22 (aired November 27)	Ram Kaicho	Masahiro Takanashi Produce Bokutachi Yon Juku de Yon Aishimasu! 2022	
November 22 (aired November 27)	Saki Akai	Masahiro Takanashi Produce Bokutachi Yon Juku de Yon Aishimasu! 2022	

=== Ice Ribbon ===
ICE×∞ Championship
Incoming champion – Tsukushi Haruka
Date	Winner	Event/Show	Note(s)
May 4	Vacated	New Ice Ribbon #1199 ~ Yokohama Budokan II	The championship was vacated after Haruka retired from professional wrestling.
March 19	Saori Anou	After the Rain Ribbon 2022	Defeated Yuki Mashiro in a tournament final to win the vacant title.

FantastICE Championship
Incoming champion – Akane Fujita
Date	Winner	Event/Show	Note(s)
No title changes

Triangle Ribbon Championship
Incoming champion – Maika Ozaki
Date	Winner	Event/Show	Note(s)
January 16	Yuki Mashiro	New Ice Ribbon #1173	This was a three-way match, also involving Miyako Matsumoto.
December 31	Vacated	Ribbonmania 2022	The championship was vacated after Mashiro retired from professional wrestling.

International Ribbon Tag Team Championship
Incoming champion – Parent&Child (Hamuko Hoshi and Ibuki Hoshi)
Date	Winner	Event/Show	Note(s)
March 27	galaxyPunch! (Hikari Shimizu and Saki)	New Ice Ribbon #1189 In 176BOX	
May 4	Big☆Dekai (Satsuki Totoro and Yuna Manase)	New Ice Ribbon #1199 ~ Ice Ribbon Yokohama Budokan II	
July 31	Mukomako (Makoto and Hamuko Hoshi)	Summer Jumbo Ribbon 2022	
September 24	Hikaru Shida and Ibuki Hoshi	New Ice Ribbon #1230	

=== Impact ===
Impact World Championship
Incoming champion – Moose
Date	Winner	Event/Show	Note(s)
April 23	Josh Alexander	Rebellion	

Impact X Division Championship
Incoming champion – Trey Miguel
Date	Winner	Event/Show	Note(s)
April 23	Ace Austin	Rebellion	Three-way match also involving Mike Bailey.
June 19	Mike Bailey	Slammiversary	Ultimate X match also involving Alex Zayne, Andrew Everett, Kenny King, and Trey Miguel.
October 7	Frankie Kazarian	Bound for Glory	
October 8 (aired October 20)	Vacated	Impact!	Vacated after Kazarian invoked Option C
November 18	Trey Miguel	Over Drive	Defeated Black Taurus in a tournament to win the vacant title.

Impact Knockouts World Championship
Incoming champion – Mickie James
Date	Winner	Event/Show	Note(s)
March 5	Tasha Steelz	Sacrifice	
June 19	Jordynne Grace	Slammiversary	Queen of the Mountain match also involving Chelsea Green, Deonna Purrazzo, and Mia Yim.

Impact World Tag Team Championship
Incoming champions – The Good Brothers (Doc Gallows and Karl Anderson)
Date	Winner	Event/Show	Note(s)
March 5	Violent By Design (Eric Young, Deaner, and Joe Doering)	Sacrifice	Young and Doering represented VBD.
May 7	The Briscoe Brothers (Jay Briscoe and Mark Briscoe)	Under Siege	Defeated Young and Deaner who represented VBD.
June 19	The Good Brothers (Doc Gallows and Karl Anderson)	Slammiversary	
August 26 (aired September 1)	Honor No More (Matt Taven and Mike Bennett)	Impact!	
October 8 (aired October 20)	Heath and Rhino	Impact!	
December 9 (aired December 15)	The Motor City Machine Guns (Alex Shelley and Chris Sabin)	Impact!	

Impact Knockouts World Tag Team Championship
Incoming champions – The IInspiration (Cassie Lee and Jessie McKay)
Date	Winner	Event/Show	Note(s)
March 5	The Influence (Madison Rayne and Tenille Dashwood)	Sacrifice	
June 19	Rosemary and Taya Valkyrie	Slammiversary	
August 12	VXT (Chelsea Green and Deonna Purrazzo)	Emergence; Pre-Show	
October 7	The Death Dollz (Jessicka, Rosemary, and Taya Valkyrie)	Bound for Glory	Jessicka was formerly known as Havok. Jessicka and Valkyrie won the titles, though Rosemary is also recognized as champion under the Freebird Rule.

Impact Digital Media Championship
Incoming champion – Jordynne Grace
Date	Winner	Event/Show	Note(s)
January 21 (aired February 1)	Matt Cardona	Impact!	
May 28	Rich Swann	REVOLVER Vegas Vacation	First time the title changed hands outside of Impact Wrestling.
July 1	Brian Myers	Against All Odds; Pre-Show	Dot Combat match.
October 22 (aired November 10)	Joe Hendry	Impact!	

=== IWRG ===
IWRG Intercontinental Heavyweight Championship
Incoming champion – El Hijo del Espectro Jr.
Date	Winner	Event/Show	Note(s)
August 10	Vacant	—	
August 21	Galena Del Mar	Caravana De Campeones	Defeated AK47 to win the vacant title.

IWRG Intercontinental Lightweight Championship
Incoming champion – Aster Boy
Date	Winner	Event/Show	Note(s)
November 24	Spider Fly	101. Torneo Fill	

IWRG Intercontinental Middleweight Championship
Incoming champion – Dragon Bane
Date	Winner	Event/Show	Note(s)
February 6	Travis Banks	El Protector	
April 3	Dr. Cerebro	Guerra del Golfo	
May 29	Tonalli	IWRG	

IWRG Intercontinental Women's Championship
Incoming champions – (Title reactivated)
Date	Winner	Event/Show	Note(s)
December 16	Diosa Quetzal	Revolucion 60	Defeated Keyra in a tournament final to win the vacant title. The title had been inactive since 2007.

IWRG Intercontinental Tag Team Championship
Incoming champions – Bryce Benjamin and Marshe Rockett
Date	Winner	Event/Show	Note(s)
April 24	The Golden Gods (Atomico Jr. and Golden Dragon)	GALLI Alianza 2	
September 25	Los OGs (Joey Marx and Mason Conrad)	GALLI	Defeated Bandolero and La Diva Salvaje, Mr. Iguana and Mr. Leo, and Los Jefes de Jefes (Golden Star & Sobrino Azteca) in a four-way tag team match for the vacant title. Promoted by GALLI.
N/A	El Hijo de Canis Lupus and Rey Léon	IWRG	The exact date the title changed occurred is unknown.

IWRG Intercontinental Trios Championship
Incoming champions – La Dinastía de la Muerte (Negro Navarro, Trauma I and Trauma II)
Date	Winner	Event/Show	Note(s)
July 3	Espartaco, Latino and Tempestad	Promociones Cantu live event	

IWRG Intercontinental Welterweight Championship
Incoming champion – Jessy Ventura
Date	Winner	Event/Show	Note(s)
December 25	Tonalli	Ruleta de la Muerte	

IWRG Junior de Juniors Championship
Incoming champion – El Hijo del Alebrije
Date	Winner	Event/Show	Note(s)
March 27	Dick Angelo 3G	IWRG	

IWRG Rey del Aire Championship
Incoming champion – Dragon Bane
Date	Winner	Event/Show	Note(s)
January 2	Freelance	Guerreros De Acero	Steel Cage match
June 16	Puma de Oro	IWRG Thursday Night Wrestling	
June 16	Noisy Boy	IWRG Thursday Night Wrestling	

IWRG Mexico Championship
Incoming champion – Toxin
Date	Winner	Event/Show	Note(s)
July 17	Puma de Oro	La Jaula De Las Locas 2022	
October 30	Tonalli	Castillo del Terro 2022	Tonalli's IWRG Intercontinental Middleweight Championship was also on the line.

IWRG Rey del Ring Championship
Incoming champion – Hijo de Canis Lupus
Date	Winner	Event/Show	Note(s)
May 15	Vacant	—	
May 15	Hijo del Pirata Morgan	IWRG	Won the 2022 IWRG Rey del Ring to win the vacant title.

Distrito Federal Trios Championship
Incoming champions – El Infierno Eterno (Demonio Infernal, Eterno, and Lunatic Xtreme)
No title changes.

=== MLW ===
MLW World Heavyweight Championship
Incoming champion – Alexander Hammerstone
No title changes.

MLW World Tag Team Championship
Incoming champions – 5150 (Danny Rivera and Slice Boogie)
Date	Winner	Event/Show	Note(s)
February 26	Hustle and Power (EJ Nduka and Calvin Tankman)	SuperFight	

MLW World Middleweight Championship
Incoming champion – Tajiri
Date	Winner	Event/Show	Note(s)
January 21	Myron Reed	Blood & Thunder	Four-way match also involving Matt Cross and Bandido.
September 18	Shun Skywalker	Super Series	
October 30	Lince Dorado	Fightland	

MLW National Openweight Championship
Incoming champion – Alex Kane
Date	Winner	Event/Show	Note(s)
June 23	Davey Richards	Battle Riot IV	

MLW Caribbean Heavyweight Championship
Incoming champion – King Muertes
Date	Winner	Event/Show	Note(s)
March 31	Octagón Jr.	Intimidation Games	Cyclone match also involving El Dragón and El Hijo de L.A. Park.

MLW World Women's Featherweight Championship
(Title created)
Date	Winner	Event/Show	Note(s)
May 13	Taya Valkyrie	Kings of Colosseum	Defeated Holidead to become the inaugural champion.

=== M-Pro ===
Tohoku Junior Heavyweight Championship
Incoming champion – Musashi
Date	Winner	Event/Show	Note(s)
July 1 (aired July 10)	Fujita Hayato	Pro Wrestling 2022 Tokyo Conference Vol. 1 ~ Genko Itchi	

Tohoku Tag Team Championship
Incoming champions – The Great Sasuke and Jinsei Shinzaki
Date	Winner	Event/Show	Note(s)
March 6	Gaina and Taro Nohashi	Michinoku Pro Wrestling	
July 17	Bad Boy (Ken45° and Manjimaru)	July Series 2022 ~ Rihi Kyokuchoku; Night 2	
November 19	Kazuki Hashimoto and Musashi	November Series 2022 ~ Kenkai Koko	

UWA World Tag Team Championship
Incoming champions – Gaina and Taro Nohashi
Date	Winner	Event/Show	Note(s)
June 5	Eisa8 and Hub	BJW Osaka Surprise 59 - Perfect Style 2022	Promoted by Big Japan Pro Wrestling.

=== Zero1 ===
World Heavyweight Championship
Incoming champion – Takashi Sugiura
Date	Winner	Event/Show	Note(s)
June 5	Masato Tanaka	Shinjiro Otani Aid! Get Up As Many Times As You Want	

United National Heavyweight Championship
Incoming champion – Chris Vice
No title changes.

World Junior Heavyweight Championship
Incoming champion – Fuminori Abe
Date	Winner	Event/Show	Note(s)
April 10	Astroman	Osu Premium Show ZERO1 20th & 21st Anniversary Pro Wrestling	Also for Abe's International Junior Heavyweight Championship.

International Junior Heavyweight Championship
Incoming champion – Fuminori Abe
Date	Winner	Event/Show	Note(s)
April 10	Astroman	Osu Premium Show ZERO1 20th & 21st Anniversary Pro Wrestling	Also for Abe's World Junior Heavyweight Championship.

Intercontinental Tag Team Championship
Incoming champions – Gajo and Tomohiko Hashimoto
Date	Winner	Event/Show	Note(s)
March 6	Junya Matsunaga and Takafumi	21st Anniversary Launch	

International Lightweight Tag Team Championship
Incoming champions – Sugi and Raicho
No title changes.

Zero1 USA World Heavyweight Championship
Incoming champion – Camaro Jackson
Date	Winner	Event/Show	Note(s)
February 27	Jake Lander	Zero1 USA	Steel Cage match.
October 22	Marvin Moser	Zero1 USA	Three-way match also involving Victor Analog
October 22	Joey O'Riley	Zero1 USA	O'Riley immediately challenge Moser for the title after the match.

Zero1 USA World Junior Heavyweight Championship
Incoming champion – Jimmy Karryt
Date	Winner	Event/Show	Note(s)
April 30	Mat Fitchett	Zero1 USA	
November 23	Vacated	—	Vacated after Fitchett suffered an injury.
December 17	Victor Analog	Zero1 USA	Defeated Anakin Murphy, Devonte Knox, and Eli Wylder in a four-way elimination match to win the vacant title.

Zero1 USA World Tag Team Championship
Incoming champions – The Besties In The World (Davey Vega and Mat Fitchett)
Date	Winner	Event/Show	Note(s)
N/A	The Premier (Campbell Myers & SK Bishop)	Zero1 USA	The exact date the title change occurred is unknown.
April 30	Country Aire (Doc Simmons and Zach Hendrix)	Zero1 USA	

Zero1 USA World Women's Championship
Incoming champion – Vacant
Date	Winner	Event/Show	Note(s)
January 23	Max The Impaler	Zero1 USA	Defeated Rahne Victoria in the finals of the Josei Taichi Tournament for the vacant title

Blast King Championship
Incoming champions – Taru
No title changes.

Blast Queen Championship
Incoming champion – Hiroyo Matsumoto
No title changes.

Blast King Tag Team Championship
Incoming champions – Revengers (Masato Tanaka and Kide Kubota)
No title changes.

=== Noah ===
GHC Heavyweight Championship
Incoming champion – Katsuhiko Nakajima
Date	Winner	Event/Show	Note(s)
February 23	Kazuyuki Fujita	Gain Control 2022 in Nagoya	
April 27	Vacated	—	Vacated after Fujita tested positive for COVID-19.
April 30	Go Shiozaki	Majestic 2022	Defeated Kaito Kiyomiya to win the vacant title.
June 12	Satoshi Kojima	CyberFight Festival 2022	
July 16	Kenoh	Destination 2022	
September 25	Kaito Kiyomiya	Grand Ship In Nagoya - Pro-Wrestling Love Forever 2 "Outbreak"	

GHC Junior Heavyweight Championship
Incoming champion – Hayata
Date	Winner	Event/Show	Note(s)
January 10	Daisuke Harada	N Innovation U-Cup; Night 3	
March 13	Eita	Great Voyage in Yokohama 2022	
April 29	Hayata	Majestic 2022 - N Innovation	
October 30	Ninja Mack	Ariake Triumph - The Return - Pro-Wrestling Love Forever 3 ~ Triumph ~	
November 10	Dante Leon	Global Honored Crown	
December 23	Amakusa	N Innovation	

GHC National Championship
Incoming champion – Kenoh
Date	Winner	Event/Show	Note(s)
January 23	Masakatsu Funaki	Higher Ground; Night 1	
November 10	El Hijo de Dr. Wagner Jr.	Global Honored Crown	

GHC Tag Team Championship
Incoming champions – M's Alliance (Keiji Muto & Naomichi Marufuji)
Date	Winner	Event/Show	Note(s)
February 3	Vacated	—	Vacated after Muto suffered a hip injury.
March 13	Sugiura-gun (Takashi Sugiura and Hideki Suzuki)	Great Voyage 2022 In Yokohama	Defeated Kaito Kiyomiya and Daiki Inaba in a tournament final for the vacant titles.
May 4	El Hijo de Dr. Wagner Jr. and René Duprée	Dream On 2022	
May 21	Masa Kitamiya and Michael Elgin	Dream On 2022 Final	
July 16	Vacated	—	Vacated after Elgin was unable to make it to the scheduled defense.
July 16	Hideki Suzuki and Timothy Thatcher	Destination 2022	Defeated Masa Kitamiya and Yoshiki Inamura for the vacant titles.
September 25	Sugiura-gun (Satoshi Kojima and Takashi Sugiura)	Grand Ship In Nagoya - Pro-Wrestling Love Forever 2 "Outbreak"	

GHC Junior Heavyweight Tag Team Championship
Incoming champions – Vacant
Date	Winner	Event/Show	Note(s)
January 22	Stinger (Seiki Yoshioka and Yuya Susumu)	Higher Ground; Night 1	Defeated Atsushi Kotoge and Hajime Ohara to win the vacant title.
February 11	Vacated	—	Vacated after Yoshioka suffered a heel injury.
February 23	Atsushi Kotoge and Yo-Hey	Gain Control 2022 in Nagoya	Defeated Stinger (Hayata and Yuya Susumu) to win the vacant title.
April 29	Stinger (Chris Ridgeway and Yoshinari Ogawa)	Majestic 2022 - N Innovation	
September 25	Atsushi Kotoge and Seiki Yoshioka	Grand Ship In Nagoya - Pro-Wrestling Love Forever 2 "Outbreak"	
November 10	Kongo (Hajime Ohara and Shuji Kondo)	Global Honored Crown	
November 23	Atsushi Kotoge and Seiki Yoshioka	The Best	
December 23	Kzy and Yo-Hey	N Innovation	

=== Stardom ===
World of Stardom Championship
Incoming champion – Syuri
Date	Winner	Event/Show	Note(s)
December 29	Giulia	Dream Queendom 2	

Wonder of Stardom Championship
Incoming champion – Saya Kamitani
No title changes.

Goddesses of Stardom Championship
Incoming champion – Alto Livello Kabaliwan (Giulia & Syuri)
Date	Winner	Event/Show	Note(s)
January 9	FWC (Hazuki & Koguma)	New Year's Stars in Korokuen Hall; Night 2	
March 26	Black Desire (Momo Watanabe & Starlight Kid)	World Climax 2022; Night 1	
May 5	FWC (Hazuki & Koguma)	Stardom Golden Week Fight Tour 2022; Night 4: Fukuoka Goddess Festival ~Batten Stardom~	
August 21	meltear (Tam Nakano & Natsupoi)	Stardom x Stardom: Nagoya Midsummer Encounter	
December 29	7Upp (Nanae Takahashi and Yuu)	Dream Queendom 2	

Artist of Stardom Championship
Incoming champions – MaiHimePoi (Maika, Himeka & Natsupoi)
Date	Winner	Event/Show	Note(s)
May 28	Oedo Tai (Saki Kashima, Momo Watanabe & Starlight Kid)	Flashing Champions	
December 29	Prominence (Risa Sera, Suzu Suzuki, and Hiragi Kurumi)	Dream Queendom 2	Hardcore match.

High Speed Championship
Incoming champion – Starlight Kid
Date	Winner	Event/Show	Note(s)
February 23	AZM	Cinderella Journey	

SWA World Championship
Incoming champion – Vacant
Date	Winner	Event/Show	Note(s)
January 29	Thekla	Nagoya Supreme Fight	Defeated Mina Shirakawa for the vacant title.
May 4	Mayu Iwatani	Golden Week Fight Tour; Night 4	
November 3	Vacant	Hiroshima Goddess Festival	Iwatani voluntarily relinquished the title to focus on the IWGP Women's Championship Tournament.
November 3	Deactivated	—	The championship was abandoned.

Future of Stardom Championship
Incoming champion – Hanan
Date	Winner	Event/Show	Note(s)
October 19	Ami Sourei	New Blood 5	

IWGP Women's Championship
Incoming champion – (Title created)
Date	Winner	Event/Show	Note(s)
November 20	Kairi	Historic X-Over	Defeated Mayu Iwatani in a tournament final to become the inaugural champion.

=== Progress ===
PROGRESS World Championship
Incoming champion – Cara Noir
Date	Winner	Event/Show	Note(s)
March 20	Jonathan Gresham	Chapter 130: Dodge, Dip, Duck, Dive, Dodge	This was a winner takes all match, in which Gresham defended the ROH World Championship.
May 15	Vacated	Chapter 134: No Mountain High Enough	Jonathan Gresham was stripped of the title due to interference by Lykos Gym (Kid Lykos and Kid Lykos II) in his title defence against Gene Munny.
June 5	Chris Ridgeway	Chapter 135: Super Strong Style 16	Ridgeway defeated Warren Banks in the Super Strong Style 16 tournament final to win the vacant title.
August 13	Big Damo	Chapter 137: The Deadly Viper Tour - Codename: Copperhead	
August 28	Spike Trivet	Chapter 139: Warriors Come Out To Play	

Progress Wrestling Atlas Championship
Incoming champion – Title reactivated
Date	Winner	Event/Show	Note(s)
April 18	Luke Jacobs	Chapter 133: Stop Motion Skeleton Battle	Defeated Jonah in a tournament final to win the reactivated championship.
September 25	Big Damo	Chapter 142: The Deadly Viper Tour	

Progress Tag Team Championship
Incoming champion – Smokin' Aces (Charlie Sterling and Nick Riley)
Date	Winner	Event/Show	Note(s)
March 25	The 0121 (Dan Moloney and Man Like DeReiss)	Chapter 131: 10th Anniversary	This was a five-way gauntlet match, also involving Lykos Gym (Kid Lykos and Kid Lykos II), Sunshine Machine (Chuck Mambo and TK Cooper), and North West Strong (Chris Ridgeway and Luke Jacobs).
June 4	Sunshine Machine (Chuck Mambo and TK Cooper)	Chapter 135: Super Strong Style 16 Tournament Edition 2022	This was a three-way ladder match, also involving Smokin' Aces (Charlie Sterling and Nick Riley).

Progress Wrestling World Women's Championship
Incoming champion – Gisele Shaw
Date	Winner	Event/Show	Note(s)
June 4	Kanji	Chapter 135: Super Strong Style 16 Tournament Edition 2022	This was a Two-out-of-three falls match, in which Kanji won 2–1.
November 27	Lana Austin	Chapter 146: They Think It's All Over...	

Progress Proteus Championship
Incoming champion – Paul Robinson
Date	Winner	Event/Show	Note(s)
No title changes

=== NJPW ===
IWGP World Heavyweight Championship
Incoming champion – Shingo Takagi
Date	Winner	Event/Show	Note(s)
January 4	Kazuchika Okada	Wrestle Kingdom 16; Night 1	
June 12	Jay White	Dominion 6.12 in Osaka-jo Hall	

IWGP United States Championship
Incoming champion – Kenta
Date	Winner	Event/Show	Note(s)
January 5	Hiroshi Tanahashi	Wrestle Kingdom 16; Night 2	No Disqualification match
February 19	Sanada	NJPW New Years Golden Series	
April 9	Vacated	Hyper Battle '22	Sanada vacated the title after suffering a fractured orbital bone.
May 1	Hiroshi Tanahashi	Wrestling Dontaku 2022	Defeated Tomohiro Ishii for the vacant title.
May 14	Juice Robinson	Capital Collision	Four-way match also involving Jon Moxley and Will Ospreay.
June 12	Vacated	—	Robinson vacated the title after contracting appendicitis.
June 12	Will Ospreay	Dominion 6.12 in Osaka-jo Hall	Defeated Sanada to win the vacant title.

IWGP Tag Team Championship
Incoming champions – Dangerous Tekkers (Taichi and Zack Sabre Jr.)
Date	Winner	Event/Show	Note(s)
January 4	Bishamon (Hirooki Goto and Yoshi-Hashi)	Wrestle Kingdom 16; Night 1	
April 9	United Empire (Jeff Cobb and Great-O-Khan)	Hyper Battle '22	
May 1	General's Jewel (Bad Luck Fale and Chase Owens)	Wrestling Dontaku 2022	Three-way tag team match also involving Bishamon (Hirooki Goto and Yoshi-Hashi)
June 12	United Empire (Jeff Cobb and Great-O-Khan)	Dominion 6.12 in Osaka-jo Hall	
June 26	FTR (Dax Harwood and Cash Wheeler)	AEW x NJPW: Forbidden Door	Three-way tag team match also involving Roppongi Vice (Rocky Romero and Trent Beretta). FTR's ROH World Tag Team Championship was also on the line.

IWGP Junior Heavyweight Championship
Incoming champion – El Desperado
Date	Winner	Event/Show	Note(s)
May 1	Taiji Ishimori	Wrestling Dontaku 2022	

IWGP Junior Heavyweight Tag Team Championship
Incoming champions – Flying Tiger (Robbie Eagles and Tiger Mask)
Date	Winner	Event/Show	Note(s)
February 19	Six Or Nine (Ryusuke Taguchi and Master Wato)	NJPW New Years Golden Series	Four-way tag team match involving Bullet Club's Cutest Tag Team (El Phantasmo and Taiji Ishimori) and Suzuki-gun (El Desperado and Yoshinobu Kanemaru)
June 20	Catch 2/2 (TJP and Francesco Akira)	New Japan Road; Night 4	

IWGP Women's Championship
Incoming champion – (Title created)
Date	Winner	Event/Show	Note(s)
November 20	Kairi	Historic X-Over	Defeated Mayu Iwatani in a tournament final to become the inaugural champion.

NEVER Openweight Championship
Incoming champion – Tomohiro Ishii
Date	Winner	Event/Show	Note(s)
January 4	Evil	Wrestle Kingdom 16; Night 1	
May 1	Tama Tonga	Wrestling Dontaku 2022	
June 12	Karl Anderson	Dominion 6.12 in Osaka-jo Hall	On October 10, Anderson and partner Doc Gallows returned to WWE while Anderson was still champion.

NEVER Openweight 6-Man Tag Team Championship
Incoming champions – House of Torture (Evil, Sho, and Yujiro Takahashi)
Date	Winner	Event/Show	Note(s)
July 5	Chaos (Yoh, Yoshi-Hashi, and Hirooki Goto)	New Japan Road 2022; Night 8	
September 23	House of Torture (Evil, Sho, and Yujiro Takahashi)	Burning Spirit 2022; Night 13	

KOPW
Incoming Champion – Toru Yano
Date	Winner	Event/Show	Note(s)
December 19	Shingo Takagi	JTO 50th Anniversary for TakaTaichi Together	Defeated Taichi in a Last Man Standing Lumberjack match to become the official 2022 champion. Promoted by Just Tap Out Professional Wrestling

Strong Openweight Championship
Incoming Champion – Tom Lawlor
Date	Winner	Event/Show	Note(s)
May 15 (aired June 26)	Fred Rosser	Strong: Collision in Philadelphia	Title vs. Career match

Strong Openweight Tag Team Championship
(Title created)
Date	Winner	Event/Show	Note(s)
July 24 (aired August 13)	Aussie Open (Mark Davis and Kyle Fletcher)	Strong: High Alert	Defeated Christopher Daniels and Yuya Uemura in a tournament final to become the inaugural champions.
October 28	The Motor City Machine Guns (Alex Shelley and Chris Sabin)	Rumble on 44th Street	Three-way tag team match also involving Kevin Knight and The DKC.

=== NWA ===
NWA Worlds Heavyweight Championship
Incoming champion – Trevor Murdoch
Date	Winner	Event/Show	Note(s)
February 12	Matt Cardona	PowerrrTrip	
June 12	Vacated	Alwayz Ready	Cardona vacated the title after suffering a torn bicep.
June 12	Trevor Murdoch	Alwayz Ready	Defeated Nick Aldis, Thom Latimer, and Sam Shaw to win the vacant title.
November 12	Tyrus	Hard Times 3	Three-way match also involving Matt Cardona.

NWA National Championship
Incoming champion – Chris Adonis
Date	Winner	Event/Show	Note(s)
February 12	Anthony Mayweather	PowerrrTrip	
March 20	Jax Dane	Crockett Cup; Night 2	This was Dane's Champion Series title match.
August 27	Cyon	NWA 74th Anniversary Show; Night 1	

NWA World Television Championship
Incoming champion – Tyrus
Date	Winner	Event/Show	Note(s)
August 31 (aired September 24)	Vacated	NWA USA	Tyrus vacated the title to challenge Trevor Murdoch for the NWA Worlds Heavyweight Championship at Hard Times 3 as part of the "Lucky Seven Rule."
November 12	Jordan Clearwater	Hard Times 3 Pre-Show	Defeated AJ Cazana to win the vacant title.

NWA World Junior Heavyweight Championship
(Title reactivated)
Date	Winner	Event/Show	Note(s)
March 20	Homicide	Crockett Cup; Night 2	Defeated Austin Aries, Darius Lockhart, and Colby Corino in a tournament final to win the vacant title.
November 12	Kerry Morton	Hard Times 3	

NWA World Women's Championship
Incoming champion – Kamille
No title changes.

NWA World Tag Team Championship
Incoming champions – La Rebelión (Bestia 666 and Mecha Wolf 450)
Date	Winner	Event/Show	Note(s)
June 12	The Commonwealth Connection (Doug Williams and Harry Smith)	Alwayz Ready	
August 27	Vacated	NWA 74th Anniversary Show; Night 1	Vacated after Smith was unable to defend the title due to illness.
June 12	La Rebelión (Bestia 666 and Mecha Wolf 450)	NWA 74th Anniversary Show; Night 1	Defeated Hawx Aerie (Luke Hawx and PJ Hawx) to win the vacant title.

NWA United States Tag Team Championship
(Title reactivated)
Date	Winner	Event/Show	Note(s)
August 28	The Fixers (Jay Bradley and Wrecking Ball Legursky)	NWA 74th Anniversary Show; Night 2	Won a tag team battle royal to win the vacant championship.

NWA World Women's Tag Team Championship
Incoming champions – The Hex (Allysin Kay and Marti Belle)
Date	Winner	Event/Show	Note(s)
June 12	Pretty Empowered (Ella Envy and Kenzie Paige)	Alwayz Ready	

=== ROH ===
ROH World Championship
Incoming champions – Bandido and Jonathan Gresham
Bandido and Gresham were originally supposed to wrestle at Final Battle for the title, but Bandido was pulled from the show after contracting COVID-19. Gresham defeated Jay Lethal at the event to win the original ROH World Championship title, but Bandido was also recognized as lineal champion, carrying the current design. Both champions would make defenses of their titles through the year until ROH's return from hiatus at Supercard of Honor XV, where Gresham defeated Bandido to become the undisputed champion.
Date	Winner	Event/Show	Note(s)
July 23	Claudio Castagnoli	Death Before Dishonor	
September 21	Chris Jericho	AEW Dynamite: Grand Slam	First time the title changed hands on an All Elite Wrestling show.
December 10	Claudio Castagnoli	Final Battle	

ROH World Television Championship
Incoming champion – Rhett Titus
Date	Winner	Event/Show	Note(s)
April 1	Minoru Suzuki	Supercard of Honor XV	
April 13	Samoa Joe	AEW Dynamite	First time the title changed hands on an All Elite Wrestling show.

ROH Pure Championship
Incoming champion – Josh Woods
Date	Winner	Event/Show	Note(s)
April 1	Wheeler Yuta	Supercard of Honor XV	
September 7	Daniel Garcia	AEW Dynamite	First time the title changed hands on an All Elite Wrestling show.
December 10	Wheeler Yuta	Final Battle	

ROH Women's World Championship
Incoming champion – Rok-C
Date	Winner	Event/Show	Note(s)
January 9 (aired January 13)	Deonna Purrazzo	Impact!	First time the title changed hands on an Impact Wrestling show. Purrazzo's AAA Reina de Reinas Championship was also on the line.
April 1	Mercedes Martinez	Supercard of Honor XV	Lineal champion Deonna Purrazzo was unable to defend the title at the event as she was already booked for Multiverse of Matches the same night. Martinez defeated Willow Nightingale to become the interim champion.
May 4	Mercedes Martinez	AEW Dynamite	Defeated lineal champion Deonna Purrazzo to become the undisputed ROH Women's World champion. This is officially recognized as the end of Purrazzo's reign and the start of Martinez's.
December 10	Athena	Final Battle	

ROH World Tag Team Championship
Incoming champions – The Briscoe Brothers (Jay Briscoe and Mark Briscoe)
Date	Winner	Event/Show	Note(s)
April 1	FTR (Dax Harwood and Cash Wheeler)	Supercard of Honor XV	
December 10	The Briscoe Brothers (Jay Briscoe and Mark Briscoe)	Final Battle	Double Dog Collar match.

ROH World Six-Man Tag Team Championship
Incoming champions – The Righteous (Bateman, Dutch, and Vincent)
Date	Winner	Event/Show	Note(s)
July 23	Dalton Castle and The Boys (Brandon Tate and Brent Tate)	Death Before Dishonor	
December 10	The Embassy (Brian Cage and Gates of Agony (Jasper Kaun and Toa Liona))	Final Battle	

=== WWE ===
– Raw
– SmackDown
– NXT
– NXT UK
– Unbranded

==== Raw and SmackDown ====
Raw and SmackDown each have a men's world championship, a secondary men's championship, a women's world championship, and a men's tag team championship. There is also a women's tag team championship, available to both brands.

WWE Championship
Incoming champion – Big E
Date	Winner	Event/Show	Note(s)
January 1	Brock Lesnar	Day 1	Fatal five-way match also involving Kevin Owens, Bobby Lashley, and Seth "Freakin" Rollins. Lesnar was originally scheduled to face Roman Reigns for SmackDown's Universal Championship at this event, but that match was canceled as Reigns tested positive for COVID-19 and Lesnar was instead added to this WWE Championship match.
January 29	Bobby Lashley	Royal Rumble	
February 19	Brock Lesnar	Elimination Chamber	Elimination Chamber match, also involving AJ Styles, Seth "Freakin" Rollins, Riddle, and Austin Theory, who Lesnar last eliminated to win.
April 3	Roman Reigns	WrestleMania 38; Night 2	Winner Takes All match, in which Reigns also defended SmackDown's Universal Championship. With both championships, Reigns became recognized as the Undisputed WWE Universal Champion.

WWE Universal Championship
Incoming champion – Roman Reigns
On Night 2 of WrestleMania 38 on April 3, Reigns defeated Brock Lesnar in a Winner Takes All match to win Raw's WWE Championship. He subsequently became recognized as the Undisputed WWE Universal Champion.
No title changes.

WWE United States Championship
Incoming champion – Damian Priest
Date	Winner	Event/Show	Note(s)
February 28	Finn Bálor	Raw	
April 18	Theory	Raw	
July 2	Bobby Lashley	Money in the Bank	
October 10	Seth "Freakin" Rollins	Raw	
November 26	Austin Theory	Survivor Series: WarGames	Triple threat match, also involving Bobby Lashley. Austin Theory was previously known by his last name of Theory.

WWE Intercontinental Championship
Incoming champion – Shinsuke Nakamura
Date	Winner	Event/Show	Note(s)
February 11 (aired February 18)	Sami Zayn	SmackDown	
March 4	Ricochet	SmackDown	
June 10	Gunther	SmackDown	

WWE Raw Women's Championship
Incoming champion – Becky Lynch
Date	Winner	Event/Show	Note(s)
April 2	Bianca Belair	WrestleMania 38; Night 1	

WWE SmackDown Women's Championship
Incoming champion – Charlotte Flair
Date	Winner	Event/Show	Note(s)
May 8	Ronda Rousey	WrestleMania Backlash	"I Quit" match.
July 2	Liv Morgan	Money in the Bank	Money in the Bank cash-in match.
October 8	Ronda Rousey	Extreme Rules	Extreme Rules match.
December 30	Charlotte Flair	SmackDown	

WWE Raw Tag Team Championship
Incoming champions – RK-Bro (Randy Orton and Riddle)
Date	Winner	Event/Show	Note(s)
January 10	Alpha Academy (Chad Gable and Otis)	Raw	
March 7	RK-Bro (Randy Orton and Riddle)	Raw	Triple threat tag team match also involving Kevin Owens and Seth "Freakin" Rollins.
May 20	The Usos (Jey Uso and Jimmy Uso)	SmackDown	Winners Take All match, in which The Usos also defended the WWE SmackDown Tag Team Championship. With both championships, The Usos became recognized as the Undisputed WWE Tag Team Champions.

WWE SmackDown Tag Team Championship
Incoming champions – The Usos (Jey Uso and Jimmy Uso)
On the May 20 episode of SmackDown, The Usos defeated RK-Bro (Randy Orton and Riddle) in a Winners Take All match to win the WWE Raw Tag Team Championship. They subsequently became recognized as the Undisputed WWE Tag Team Champions.
No title changes.

WWE Women's Tag Team Championship
Incoming champions – Queen Zelina and Carmella
Date	Winner	Event/Show	Note(s)
April 3	Sasha Banks and Naomi	WrestleMania 38; Night 2	Fatal four-way tag team match also involving the teams of Rhea Ripley & Liv Morgan and Natalya & Shayna Baszler.
May 20	Vacated	SmackDown	Vacated after Sasha Banks and Naomi legitimately walked out of a scheduled appearance on the May 16 episode of Raw, leaving the championship belts behind.
August 29	Raquel Rodriguez and Aliyah	Raw	Defeated Damage CTRL (Dakota Kai and Iyo Sky) in a tournament final for the vacant championship.
September 12	Damage CTRL (Dakota Kai and Iyo Sky)	Raw	
October 31	Alexa Bliss and Asuka	Raw	
November 5	Damage CTRL (Dakota Kai and Iyo Sky)	Crown Jewel	

==== NXT ====
NXT Championship
Incoming champion – Tommaso Ciampa
Date	Winner	Event/Show	Note(s)
January 4	Bron Breakker	NXT 2.0: New Year's Evil	
March 8	Dolph Ziggler	NXT 2.0: Roadblock	Triple threat match also involving Tommaso Ciampa, who Ziggler pinned.
April 4	Bron Breakker	Raw	First NXT Championship match contested on Raw.

NXT North American Championship
Incoming champion – Carmelo Hayes
Date	Winner	Event/Show	Note(s)
April 2	Cameron Grimes	Stand & Deliver	Fatal five-way ladder match also involving Santos Escobar, Solo Sikoa, and Grayson Waller.
June 4	Carmelo Hayes	In Your House	
September 13	Solo Sikoa	NXT 2.0: One Year Anniversary Show	Sikoa unofficially replaced Wes Lee as Lee was attacked by Carmelo Hayes and Trick Williams.
N/A (aired September 20)	Vacated	NXT	Shawn Michaels ordered Solo Sikoa to vacate the title as he was not originally scheduled to be in the match in which he won the title. It is unknown when the segment was taped.
October 22	Wes Lee	Halloween Havoc	Fatal five-way ladder match also involving Carmelo Hayes, Oro Mensah, Von Wagner, and Nathan Frazer for the vacant title.

NXT Women's Championship
Incoming champion – Mandy Rose
Date	Winner	Event/Show	Note(s)
December 13	Roxanne Perez	NXT	

NXT Tag Team Championship
Incoming champions – Imperium (Fabian Aichner and Marcel Barthel)
Date	Winner	Event/Show	Note(s)
April 2	MSK (Nash Carter and Wes Lee)	Stand & Deliver	This was a triple threat tag team match also involving The Creed Brothers (Brutus Creed and Julius Creed).
April 8	Vacated	—	Vacated after Nash Carter was released from WWE following abuse allegations from his wife Kimber Lee and a photo surfacing of him impersonating Adolf Hitler.
April 12	Pretty Deadly (Elton Prince and Kit Wilson)	NXT 2.0	Won the vacant championship by last eliminating The Creed Brothers (Brutus Creed and Julius Creed) in a five-team gauntlet match, also involving Legado Del Fantasma (Joaquin Wilde and Raul Mendoza), Josh Briggs and Brooks Jensen, and Grayson Waller and Sanga.
June 4	The Creed Brothers (Brutus Creed and Julius Creed)	In Your House	
September 4	Pretty Deadly (Elton Prince and Kit Wilson)	Worlds Collide	Fatal four-way tag team elimination match, also involving Gallus (Mark Coffey and Wolfgang) and NXT UK Tag Team Champions Brooks Jensen and Josh Briggs, to unify the NXT UK Tag Team Championship into the NXT Tag Team Championship. Pretty Deadly went forward as the unified NXT Tag Team Champions.
December 10	The New Day (Kofi Kingston and Xavier Woods)	Deadline	

NXT Women's Tag Team Championship
Incoming champions – Toxic Attraction (Gigi Dolin and Jacy Jayne)
Date	Winner	Event/Show	Note(s)
April 2	Dakota Kai and Raquel González	Stand & Deliver; Kickoff	
April 5	Toxic Attraction (Gigi Dolin and Jacy Jayne)	NXT 2.0	
July 5	Cora Jade and Roxanne Perez	NXT 2.0: The Great American Bash	On the July 12 episode of NXT 2.0, Jade turned on Perez.
July 19	Roxanne Perez	NXT 2.0	Jade betrayed Perez on the June 12 episode of NXT, before she threw her championship belt in a trashcan, vacating her half of the championship. WWE.com lists this as a separate entry on the official title history, however, it is unclear if WWE views this as an official second reign for Perez or just a continuation from her reign with Jade.
July 26	Vacated	NXT 2.0	Perez vacated the championship due to not having a tag team partner.
August 2	Katana Chance and Kayden Carter	NXT 2.0	Defeated the teams of Yulisa León and Valentina Feroz, Ivy Nile and Tatum Paxley, and Toxic Attraction (Gigi Dolin and Jacy Jayne) in a fatal four-way tag team elimination match for the vacant title.

NXT Cruiserweight Championship
Incoming champion – Roderick Strong
Date	Winner	Event/Show	Note(s)
January 4	Carmelo Hayes	NXT 2.0: New Year's Evil	Championship unification match in which Hayes also defended the NXT North American Championship.
January 4	Unified	NXT 2.0: New Year's Evil	Unified into the NXT North American Championship.

==== NXT UK ====
NXT United Kingdom Championship
Incoming champion – Ilja Dragunov
Date	Winner	Event/Show	Note(s)
July 7 (aired August 4)	Vacated	NXT UK	Vacated due to Ilja Dragunov suffering an ankle injury.
July 7 (aired September 1)	Tyler Bate	NXT UK	Defeated Trent Seven in a tournament final to win the vacant title.
September 4	Unified	Worlds Collide	Bron Breakker defeated Tyler Bate to unify the NXT United Kingdom Championship into Breakker's NXT Championship. Bate is recognized as the final champion with Breakker going forward as the unified NXT Champion.

NXT UK Heritage Cup
Incoming champion – Noam Dar
Date	Winner	Event/Show	Note(s)
June 23 (aired July 14)	Mark Coffey	NXT UK	
July 7 (aired August 25)	Noam Dar	NXT UK	
On September 4, 2022, at Worlds Collide, all other NXT UK championships were retired as they were unified into their respective NXT championship counterparts due to the closure of NXT UK, which will relaunch as NXT Europe in 2024. The NXT UK Heritage Cup was the only championship from either brand that was not contested at the event. The title's status remained unknown until April 2023 when it was transferred to NXT and renamed NXT Heritage Cup.

NXT UK Women's Championship
Incoming champion – Meiko Satomura
Date	Winner	Event/Show	Note(s)
September 4	Unified	Worlds Collide	Mandy Rose defeated Blair Davenport and NXT UK Women's Champion Meiko Satomura to unify the NXT UK Women's Championship into Rose's NXT Women's Championship. Satomura is recognized as the final champion with Rose going forward as the unified NXT Women's Champion.

NXT UK Tag Team Championship
Incoming champions – Moustache Mountain (Trent Seven and Tyler Bate)
Date	Winner	Event/Show	Note(s)
April 21 (aired June 2)	Ashton Smith and Oliver Carter	NXT UK	Triple threat tag team match also involving Die Familie (Teoman and Rohan Raja).
June 22 (aired June 23)	Vacated	NXT UK	Vacated due to Ashton Smith suffering a ruptured medial collateral ligament.
June 22 (aired June 23)	Josh Briggs and Brooks Jensen	NXT UK	Defeated Dave Mastiff and Jack Starz, Mark Andrews and Wild Boar, and Die Familie (Teoman and Rohan Raja) in a fatal four-way tag team elimination match to win the vacant title.
September 4	Unified	Worlds Collide	Pretty Deadly (Elton Prince and Kit Wilson) defeated NXT Tag Team Champions The Creed Brothers (Brutus Creed and Julius Creed), Gallus (Mark Coffey and Wolfgang), and NXT UK Tag Team Champions Brooks Jensen and Josh Briggs in a fatal four-way tag team elimination match to unify the NXT UK Tag Team Championship into the NXT Tag Team Championship. Jensen and Briggs are recognized as the final champions with Pretty Deadly going forward as the unified NXT Tag Team Champions.

==== Unbranded ====
This title was not brand exclusive. The colors indicate the home brand of the champions (names without a color are former WWE wrestlers, Hall of Famers, or non-wrestlers).

WWE 24/7 Championship
Incoming champion – Dana Brooke
Date	Winner	Event/Show	Note(s)
February 14	Reggie	Raw	Pinned Dana Brooke in a restaurant.
February 21	Dana Brooke	Raw	Pinned Reggie in the ring.
April 18	Reggie	Raw	Pinned Dana Brooke in the ring during a wedding ceremony.
April 18	Tamina	Raw	Pinned Reggie in the ring during a wedding ceremony.
April 18	Akira Tozawa	Raw	Pinned Tamina in the ring during a wedding ceremony.
April 18	Dana Brooke	Raw	Pinned Akira Tozawa in the ring during a wedding ceremony.
May 2	Nikki A.S.H	Raw	Pinned Dana Brooke backstage.
May 2	Dana Brooke	Raw	Defeated Nikki A.S.H. in a regular singles match, during which the 24/7 rule was suspended.
May 30	Tamina	Raw	Took place during MizTV.
May 30	Akira Tozawa	Raw	Took place during MizTV.
June 8	Dana Brooke	Raw	Took place during Brooke's match with Becky Lynch.
June 20 (aired June 23)	Doudrop	Main Event	Defeated Dana Brooke in a regular singles match, during which the 24/7 rule was suspended.
June 20 (aired June 23)	Akira Tozawa	Main Event	Took place in the ring.
June 20 (aired June 23)	R-Truth	Main Event	Took place ringside.
June 20 (aired June 23)	Nikki A.S.H.	Main Event	Took place ringside.
June 20 (aired June 23)	Dana Brooke	Main Event	Took place in the ring.
July 9	Carmella	WWE Live	
July 9	Dana Brooke	WWE Live	
July 10	Carmella	WWE Live	
July 10	Dana Brooke	WWE Live	
July 28	Akira Tozawa	Raw	Took place during a six-woman tag team match.
July 28	Nikki A.S.H.	Raw	Took place during a six-woman tag team match.
July 28	Alexa Bliss	Raw	Took place during a six-woman tag team match.
July 28	Doudrop	Raw	Took place during a six-woman tag team match.
July 28	Tamina	Raw	Took place during a six-woman tag team match.
July 28	Dana Brooke	Raw	Took place during a six-woman tag team match.
August 20	Nikki A.S.H.	WWE Live	
August 20	Tamina	WWE Live	
August 20	Dana Brooke	WWE Live	
August 21	Nikki A.S.H.	WWE Live	
August 21	Shawn Bennett	WWE Live	Bennett was a WWE referee.
August 21	Tamina	WWE Live	
August 21	Dana Brooke	WWE Live	
September 10	Nikki A.S.H.	WWE Live	
September 10	Eddie Orengo	WWE Live	Orengo was a WWE referee.
September 10	Tamina	WWE Live	
September 10	Dana Brooke	WWE Live	
September 24	Nikki A.S.H.	WWE Live	
September 24	Aja Smith	WWE Live	Smith was a WWE referee.
September 24	Tamina	WWE Live	
September 24	Dana Brooke	WWE Live	
October 29	Nikki Cross	WWE Live	Previously known as Nikki A.S.H.
October 29	Tamina	WWE Live	
October 29	Dana Brooke	WWE Live	
October 30	Nikki Cross	WWE Live	
October 30	Tamina	WWE Live	
October 30	Dana Brooke	WWE Live	
November 7	Nikki Cross	Raw	Defeated Dana Brooke in a regular single match, during which the 24/7 rule was suspended.
November 9	Deactivated	—	On the November 7 episode of Raw, after Cross won the title, she later discarded the championship as trash. The title was retired shortly thereafter.

== Awards and honors ==
=== AAA ===
==== AAA Hall of Fame ====
Inductee
Arturo "El Rudo" Rivera
Blue Demon

=== AEW ===
==== AEW Awards ====
Category	Winner
Wrestler of the Year	Kenny Omega
Biggest Surprise	Adam Cole and Bryan Danielson debut at All Out
Breakout Star – Male	Sammy Guevara
Breakout Star – Female	Jade Cargill
Biggest Beatdown	Adam Page goes 60 minutes with Bryan Danielson at Winter Is Coming
High Flyer Award	Dante Martin
Best Moment on the Mic	CM Punk returns at The First Dance (August 20, 2021)
Biggest WTF Moment	Street Fight: TayJay (Tay Conti and Anna Jay) vs. The Bunny and Penelope Ford at New Year's Smash (December 31, 2021)
Best Twitter Follow	Nyla Rose
Best Fashion Moment	Dr. Britt Baker, D. M. D. "Brittsburg" on Dynamite (August 11, 2021)
Best Mic Duel	CM Punk and MJF at Thanksgiving Eve Dynamite (November 24, 2021)
Best Tag Team Brawl	AEW World Tag Team Championship Steel Cage match: The Young Bucks (Matt and Nick Jackson) (c) vs. The Lucha Brothers (Penta El Zero Miedo and Rey Fénix) at All Out

=== DPW ===
==== DPW Awards ====
Category	Winner
Wrestler of the Year	Bojack
Tag Team of the Year	The WorkHorsemen (Anthony Henry and JD Drake)
Breakout Star of the Year	Jay Malachi
Moment of the Year	Konosuke Takeshita yelling "Let's fucking go!" on Fire
Match of the Year	Andrew Everett vs. Konosuke Takeshita at Believe The Hype
Event of the Year	Believe The Hype

=== ESPN ===
==== ESPN Wrestling Awards ====
Award	Winner
Male Wrestler of the Year	Roman Reigns
Female Wrestler of the Year	Bianca Belair
Tag Team of the Year	The Usos (Jey Uso and Jimmy Uso)
Rookie Wrestler of the Year	Logan Paul
Breakthrough Wrestler of the Year	Ricky Starks
Promo Artist of the Year	MJF
Match of the Year	Gunther (c) vs. Sheamus for the WWE Intercontinental Championship at WWE Clash at the Castle
Best PPV Event of the Year	Forbidden Door
Best Storyline of the Year	The Bloodline

=== Fightful ===
==== Fightful Awards ====
Award	Winner
Men’s Overall Performer of the Year	Jon Moxley
Women’s Overall Performer of the Year	Bianca Belair
Men’s In-Ring Wrestler of the Year	Dax Harwood
Women’s In-Ring Wrestler of the Year	Jamie Hayter
Men's Tag Team of the Year	FTR (Dax Harwood and Cash Wheeler)
Women's Tag Team of the Year	Toxic Attraction (Mandy Rose, Gigi Dolin, and Jacy Jayne)
Trio/Stable of the Year	The Bloodline
Men's Indie Performer of the Year	Matt Cardona
Women's Indie Performer of the Year	Chelsea Green
Indie Tag Team/Group of the Year	Bussy (Effy and Allie Katch)
U21 Award	Nick Wayne
Rookie of the Year	Hook
Manager of the Year	Paul Heyman
Announcer of the Year	Excalibur
Men's Best of Promos	MJF
Women’s Best of Promos	Dr. Britt Baker, D.M.D.
Finisher of the Year	Buckshot Lariat ("Hangman" Adam Page)
Gear of the Year	Jade Cargill at Revolution
Vlog of the Year	Being the Elite
Talent Podcast of the Year	The Sessions with Renee Paquette
Best Physical Media	Mox by Jon Moxley
Booker of the Year	Tony Khan
Moment of the Year	Cody Rhodes Returns to WWE at WrestleMania 38 (Night 1)
Debut/Return of the Year	Cody Rhodes
Feud of the Year	MJF vs. CM Punk
Storyline of the Year	Sami Zayn Joins The Bloodline
Celebrity Cameo of the Year	Logan Paul
Crossover Athlete of the Year	Logan Paul
Men's Match of the Year	Gunther (c) vs. Sheamus for the WWE Intercontinental Championship at Clash at the Castle
Women's Match of the Year	Becky Lynch (c) vs. Bianca Belair for the WWE Raw Women's Championship at WrestleMania 38 (Night 1)
Tag Team Match of the Year	FTR (Dax Harwood and Cash Wheeler) (c) vs. The Briscoes (Jay Briscoe and Mark Briscoe) in a Double Dog Collar match for the ROH World Tag Team Championship at Final Battle
Event of the Year	Forbidden Door
Promotion of the Year	All Elite Wrestling
Wrestling News Story of the Year	Vince McMahon Retires from WWE

=== GCW ===
==== Indie Wrestling Hall of Fame ====
Inductee	Inducted by
Jerry Lynn	Sean Waltman
Ruckus	Sonjay Dutt
Homicide	Chris Dickinson
LuFisto	Lenny Leonard
Tracy Smothers	Nate Webb
Dave Prazak	CM Punk

==== Deathmatch Hall of Fame ====
Inductee
"Discount" Dewey Donovan
J. C. Bailey
Wifebeater
Toby Klein

=== George Tragos/Lou Thesz Professional Wrestling Hall of Fame ===
Category	Inductee
Individual	Mike Rotunda
Frank Gotch Award	Dan Spivey
James C. Melby Award	Dick Bourne
Gordon Solie Award	Jim Ross

=== Hardcore Hall of Fame ===
Inductee	Inducted by
Rob Van Dam	Jerry Lynn

=== Impact ===
==== Impact Hall of Fame ====
Inductee	Inducted by
Raven	Tommy Dreamer

==== Impact Year End Awards ====
Category	Winner
Wrestler of the Year	Josh Alexander
Knockout of the Year	Jordynne Grace
Men's Tag Team of the Year	The Motor City Machine Guns (Alex Shelley and Chris Sabin)
Knockouts Tag Team of the Year	The Death Dollz (Taya Valkyrie, Jessicka, and Rosemary)
X Division Star of the Year	Mike Bailey
Match of the Year	Josh Alexander (c) vs. Mike Bailey for the Impact World Championship on Impact! (December 8)
Moment of the Year	Josh Alexander wins the Impact World Championship from Moose at Rebellion
One to Watch in 2023	Bhupinder Gujjar

=== International Professional Wrestling Hall of Fame ===
Category	Inductee
Individual	Aleksander Aberg
Individual	Stone Cold Steve Austin
Individual	Fred Beell
Individual	Mildred Burke
Individual	Tom Cannon
Individual	Riki Choshu
Individual	Dory Funk Jr.
Individual	Karl Gotch
Individual	Tom Jenkins
Individual	Jim Londos
Individual	Billy Robinson
Individual	Joe Stecher
Individual	Genichiro Tenryu
Excelsior Award	Anthony DiPippo
Rocky Johnson Award	Azaliah Farkas
Trailblazer Award	Dan Severn

=== NJPW ===
==== NJPW Concurso (Best Body) ====
Winner
Tama Tonga

=== Pro Wrestling Illustrated ===
==== Yearly Rankings ====
List	Ranked No. 1
PWI 500	Roman Reigns
PWI Women's 150	Syuri
PWI Tag Team 100	The Usos (Jimmy Uso and Jey Uso)

==== Pro Wrestling Illustrated awards ====
Category	Winner
Wrestler of the Year	Roman Reigns
Woman of the Year	Bianca Belair
Tag Team of the Year	FTR (Dax Harwood and Cash Wheeler)
Faction of the Year	The Bloodline
Match of the Year	Cody Rhodes vs. Seth Rollins in a Hell in a Cell match at Hell in a Cell
Feud of the Year	CM Punk vs. MJF
Most Popular Wrestler of the Year	Jon Moxley
Most Hated Wrestler of the Year	MJF
Comeback of the Year	Taya Valkyrie
Most Improved Wrestler of the Year	Mandy Rose
Indie Wrestler of the Year	Matt Cardona
Inspirational Wrestler of the Year	Jon Moxley
Rookie of the Year	Hook
Stanley Weston Award (Lifetime Achievement)	Bill Apter and George Napolitano

=== ROH ===
==== ROH Hall of Fame ====
Category	Inductee
Individual	Bryan Danielson
Individual	Samoa Joe
Individual	CM Punk
Group	The Briscoe Brothers (Jay Briscoe and Mark Briscoe)
Legacy Award	Cary Silkin

=== St. Louis Wrestling Hall of Fame ===
Inudctee
Joyce Grable

=== Wrestling Observer Newsletter ===
==== Wrestling Observer Newsletter Hall of Fame ====
Category	Inductee
Individual	Místico
Individual	Kota Ibushi
Individual	Tetsuya Naito
Individual	Mark "Rollerball" Rocco
Individual	Lou Daro
Individual	Johnny Doyle
Tag Team	Holy Demon Army (Toshiaki Kawada and Akira Taue)
Group	Los Villanos (Villano I, Villano II, Villano III, Villano IV, and Villano V)

==== Wrestling Observer Newsletter awards ====
Category	Winner
Lou Thesz/Ric Flair Award (Wrestler of the Year)	Jon Moxley
Most Outstanding Wrestler	Will Ospreay
Tag Team of the Year	FTR (Dax Harwood and Cash Wheeler)
Best on Interviews	MJF
Promotion of the Year	All Elite Wrestling
Best Weekly TV Show	AEW Dynamite
Match of the Year	Kazuchika Okada vs. Will Ospreay in the G1 Climax Finals (August 12)
United States/Canada MVP	Jon Moxley
Japan MVP	Kazuchika Okada
Mexico MVP	El Hijo del Vikingo
Europe MVP	Will Ospreay
Danny Hodge Memorial Award (Non-Heavyweight MVP)	El Hijo del Vikingo
Women's Wrestling MVP	Syuri
Best Box Office Draw	Roman Reigns
Feud of the Year	FTR vs. The Briscoes
Most Improved	The Acclaimed (Anthony Bowens and Max Caster)
Most Charismatic	MJF
Brayn Danielson Award (Best Technical Wrestler)	Bryan Danielson
Bruiser Brody Award (Best Brawler)	Jon Moxley
Best Flying Wrestler	El Hijo del Vikingo
Most Overrated	Ronda Rousey
Most Underrated	Konosuke Takeshita
Rookie of the Year	Bron Breakker
Best Non-Wrestler	Paul Heyman
Best Teleivision Announcer	Kevin Kelly
Worst Television Announcer	Corey Graves
Best Major Wrestling Show	AEW x NJPW: Forbidden Door
Worst Major Wrestling Show	Royal Rumble
Best Wrestling Maneuver	Hidden Blade (Will Ospreay)
Most Disgusting Promotional Tactic	Vince McMahon appearing on television for a crowd pop after sexual misconduct allegations came out.
Worst Television Show	Monday Night Raw
Worst Match of the Year	Pat McAfee vs. Vince McMahon on Night 2 of WrestleMania 38
Worst Feud of the Year	The Miz vs. Dexter Lumis
Worst Promotion of the Year	WWE
Best Booker	Tony Khan
Promoter of the Year	Tony Khan
Best Gimmick	Sami Zayn
Worst Gimmick	Maximum Male Models (ma.çé and mån.sôör)
Best Pro Wrestling Book	Blood and Fire: The Unbelievable Real-Life Story of Wrestling’s Original Sheik by Brian Soloman
Best Pro Wrestling DVD/Streaming Documentary	Tales from the Territories: Andy Kaufman vs. The King of Memphis

=== WWE ===
==== WWE Hall of Fame ====
Category	Inductee	Inducted by
Individual	The Undertaker	Vince McMahon
Individual	Vader	Jesse White
Individual	Queen Sharmell	Booker T
Group	The Steiner Brothers (Rick Steiner and Scott Steiner)	Bron Breakker
Warrior Award	Shad Gaspard	Dana Warrior

==== NXT Superstar of the Year ====
Winner
Bron Breakker

== Debuts ==
- January 11 – Bodhi Hayward (NXT)
- February 13 – Kouki and Kaoruko Nishida (Actwres girl'Z)
- March 5 – Bozilla
- March 11 – Miyu Amasaki (STARDOM)
- March 13 – Marino Saihara (ActWresGirl'Z)
- March 19 – Juria Nagano (TJPW)
- April 19 – Damaris Griffin (NXT)
- May 11 – Mochizuki Jr. (Dragon Gate)
- May 17 – Bryson Montana (NXT)
- June 4 – Arisa Shinose (Ice Ribbon)
- June 5 – Yoshiki Kato (Dragon Gate)
- June 7 – Myles Borne (NXT)
- June 11 – Hank Walker (NXT)
- June 24 – Sol Ruca (NXT)
- August 5 – Jakara Jackson (NXT)
- August 9 – Bronco Nima (NXT) and Lucien Price (NXT)
- August 12
  - Chika Goto (Actwres girl'Z)
  - Himawari (Actwres girl'Z)
- August 14 – Takeshi Masada (DDT)
- August 21 – Kaito Nagano (Dragon Gate)
- August 28 – Hanako
- September 8 – TN Revolucion (Dragon Gate)
- September 15 – Taishi Ozawa (NOAH)
- September 18 – Yuma Anzai (AJPW)
- October 11 – Tank Ledger (NXT)
- October 14 – Wakana Uehara (TJPW)
- October 23
  - Fuwa-chan
  - Kazuma Sumi
- October 28 – Dani Palmer (NXT) and Sarah Baer (NXT)
- November 12 – Kale Dixon (NXT)
- November 15 – Oba Femi (NXT)
- December 17 – Lola Vice (NXT)

== Retirements ==
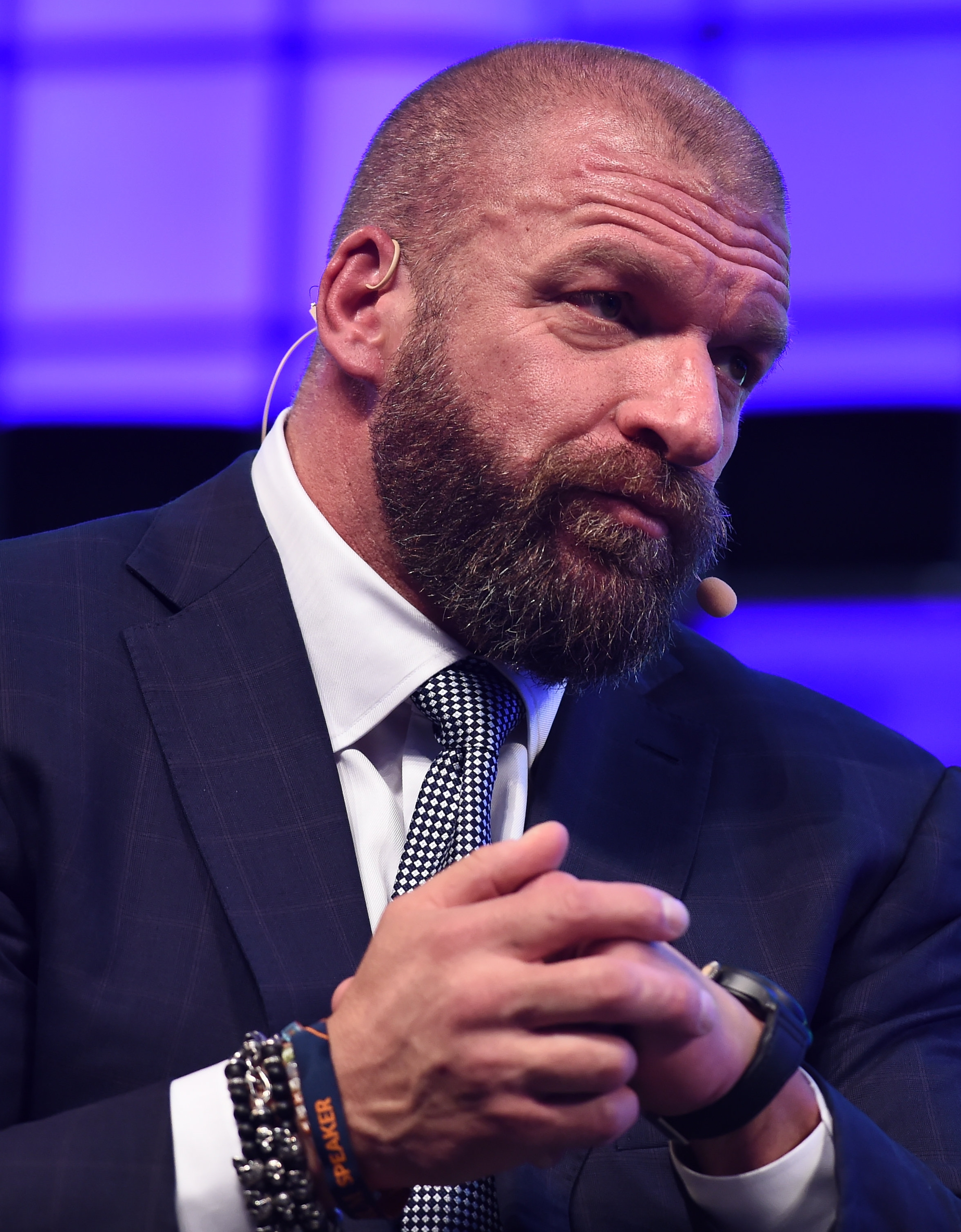
Triple H

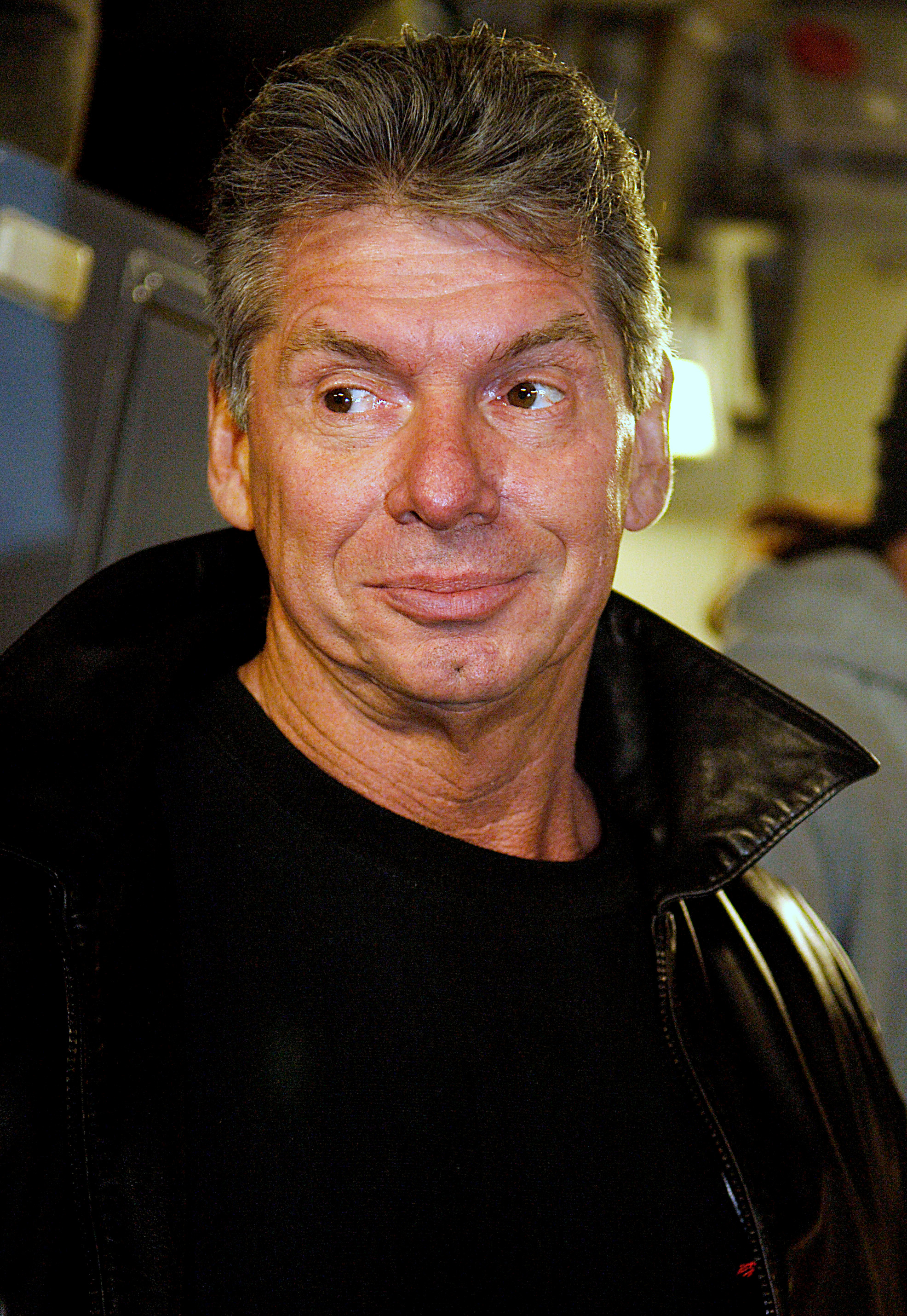
Vince McMahon

- February 13 – Tank Nagai (2012–2022)
- March 20 – LiLiCo (2014–2022)
- March 25 – Triple H (1992–2022)
- March 26
  - Reika Saiki (2016–2022)
  - Nodoka Tenma (2015–2022)
- April 7 – K-ness (1996–2022)
- May 4 – Tsukushi Haruka (2010–2022)
- May 15 – Devon Nicholson (2001–2022)
- May 31 - Kim Duk (August 30, 1968 – May 31, 2022)
- July 22 – Vince McMahon (1969–2022)
- July 31 – Ric Flair (1972–2008, 2009–2012, 2022)
- August 5 – Aiden English (2011–2022)
- August 8 – Kaoru (1986–2022)
- August 14 – Gamma (1996–2022)
- September 24 – Akira Hyodo (2018–2022)
- November 9 – Taryn Terrell (2007–2022)
- November 27 – Ricky Steamboat (1976-1994, 2009-2010, 2022)
- December 11 – Jamie Noble (1995–2015, 2022)
- December 31 – Yuki Mashiro (2019–2022) (returned in 2024)

== Deaths ==
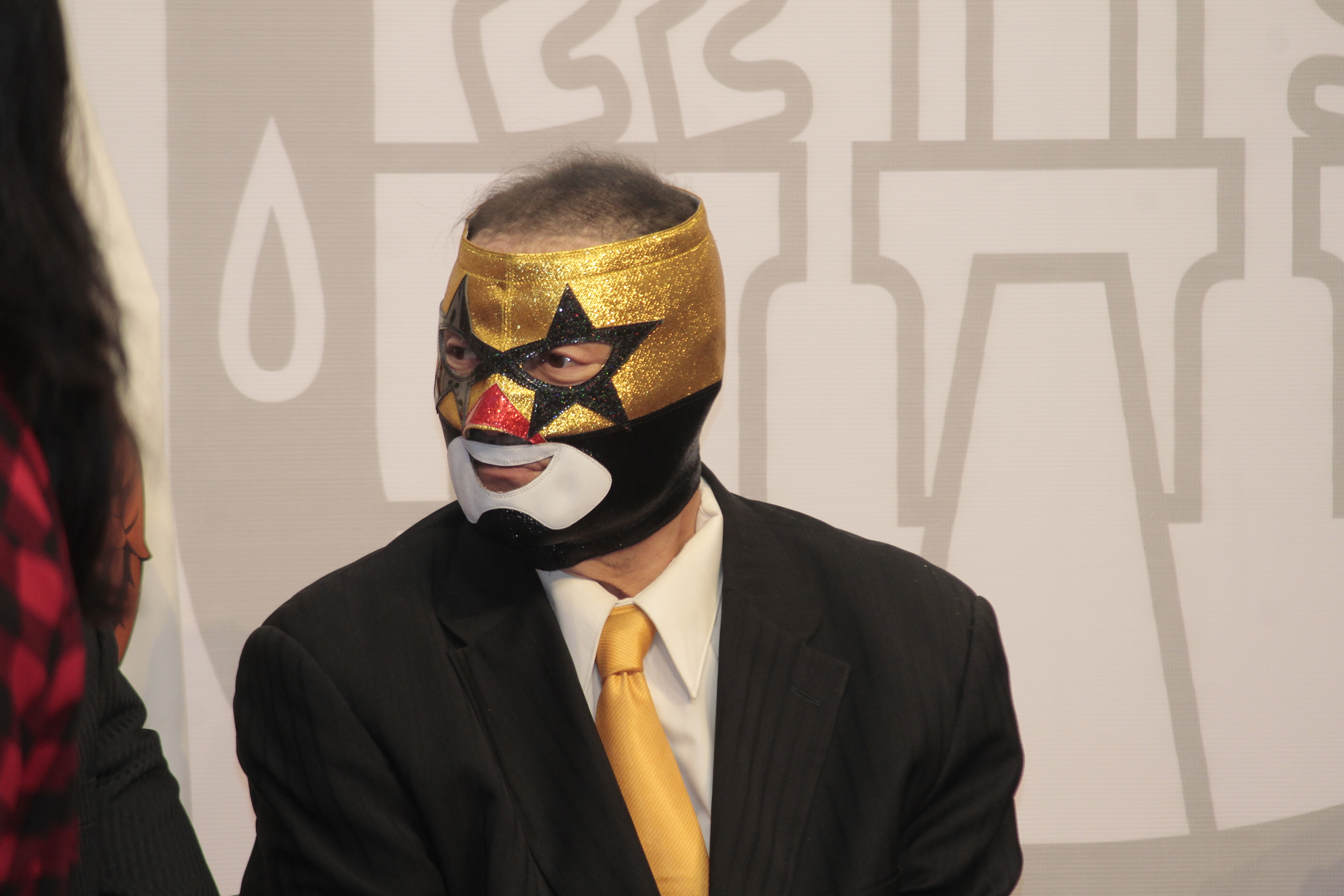
Super Muñeco

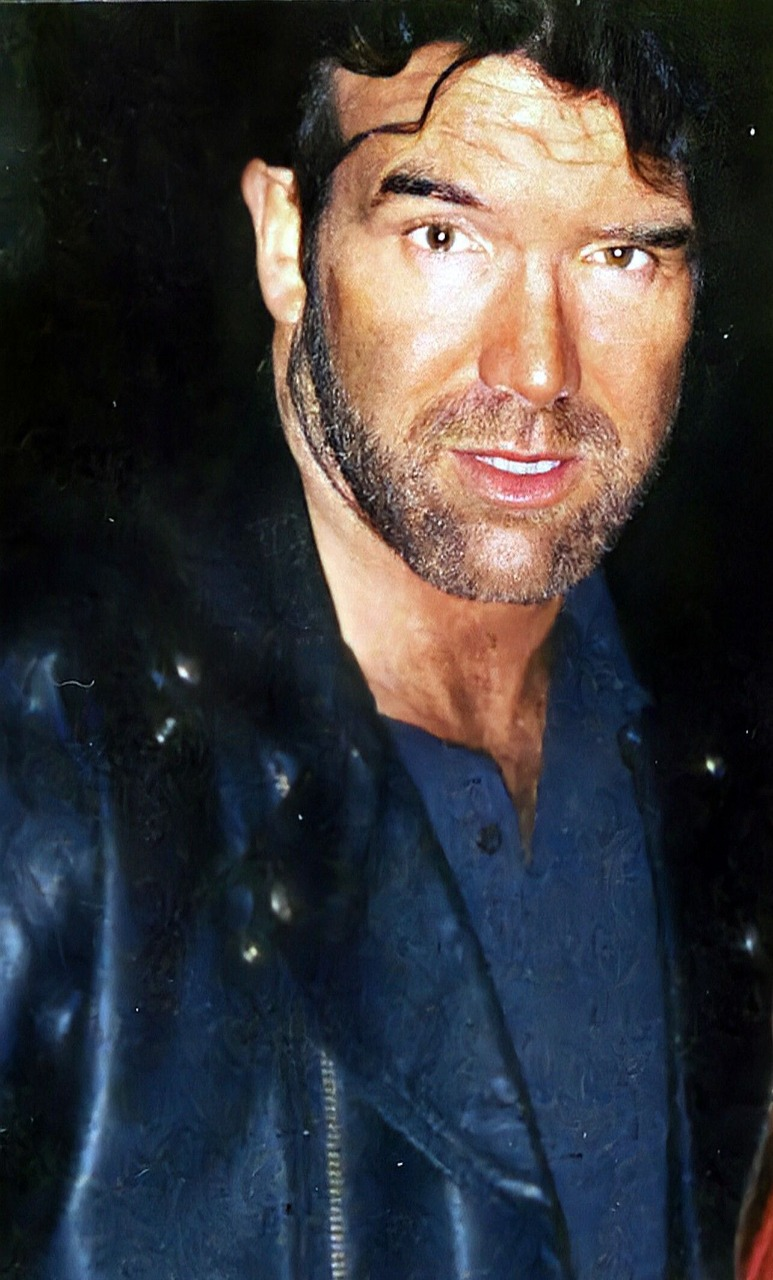
Scott Hall

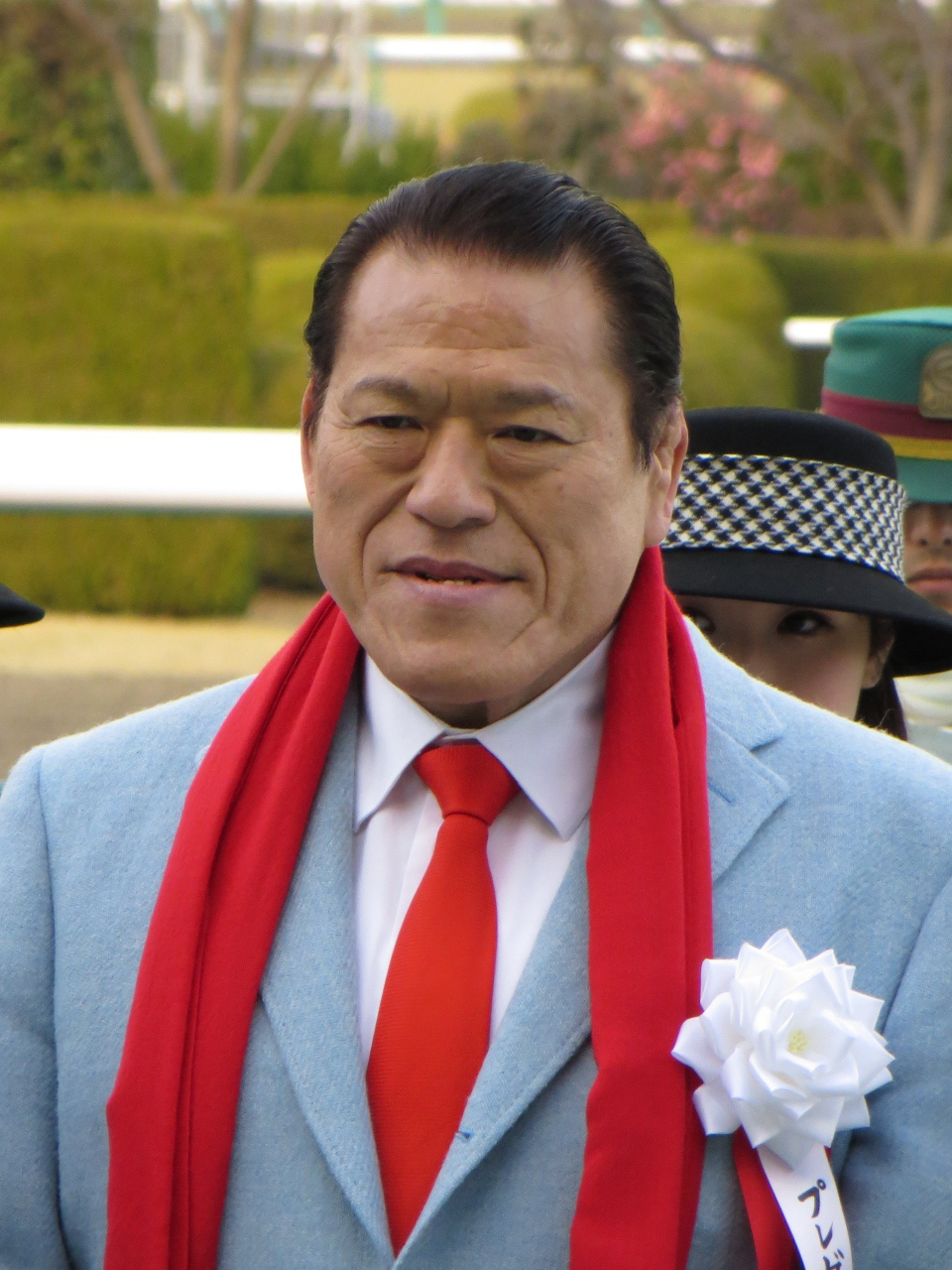
Antonio Inoki

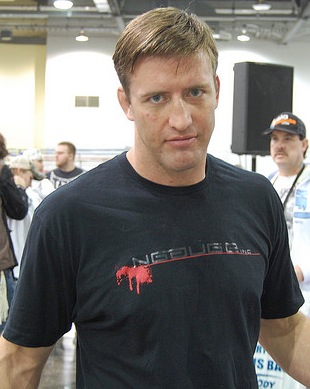
Stephan Bonnar

- January 7 – Dee Booher (born 1948)
- January 18 – Angel (Andrea Michelli) (born 1963)
- February 1 - Don Brinton (born 1928)
- February 8 – Ricky Hunter (born 1936)
- February 9
  - Candi Divine (born 1959)
  - Super Muñeco (born 1962)
  - Arturo "Rudo" Rivera (born 1954)
- February 14 – Mickie Henson (born 1963)
- February 28 – Black Man (born 1949)
- March 7 – Dan Mirade (born 1979)
- March 9
  - Joe D'Orazio (born 1922)
  - Caveman Broda (born 1953)
- March 14 – Scott Hall (born 1958)
- March 17 – Black Warrior Jr. (born 1997)
- March 18 – Pepper Martin (born 1936)
- March 27 – Rocky King (born 1958)
- April 4 – Raziel (born 1973)
- April 21 – Adam Windsor (born 1981)
- April 25 – Toro Bill Jr. (born 1986)
- May 21 – Nikolai Zouev (born 1958)
- May 28 - Denis "Boundless Gringo" Khristenko (born 1987)
- May 29 – Tarzan Goto (born 1963)
- June - Sandy Parker (born 1952)
- June 17 – Dave Hebner (born 1949)
- June 19 – Tim White (born 1954)
- July 6 – Masashi Aoyagi (born 1956)
- July 28 – Gil Hayes (born 1939)
- August 8 - Mike Masters (wrestler) (born 1954)
- August 9 – Gene LeBell (born 1932)
- August 24 – Howard Brody (born 1960)
- August 26 – Goro Tsurumi (born 1948)
- August 29 – Bill Ash (born 1946)
- September 10 – Bubba Monroe (born 1960)
- September 23 – Starman (born 1974)
- October 1 – Antonio Inoki (born 1943)
- October 6 – Sara Lee (born 1992)
- October 12 – Katsuya Kitamura (born 1985)
- November 8 – Karl Von Steiger (born 1934)
- November 19 – Farmer Brooks (born 1957)
- December 3 – Ursula Hayden (born 1966)
- December 22 – Stephan Bonnar (born 1977)
- December 29 – Jaysin Strife (born 1985)
- December 30:
  - Don West (born 1963)
  - Johnny Powers (born 1943)
- December 31 – Mike Pappas (born 1941)

== See also ==
- List of WWE pay-per-view and WWE Network events, WWE Raw special episodes, WWE SmackDown special episodes, and WWE NXT special episodes
- List of AEW pay-per-view events and AEW special events
- List of Impact Wrestling pay-per-view events and Impact Plus Monthly Specials
- List of NJPW major events and NJPW Strong special episodes
- List of World Wonder Ring Stardom major events
- List of major Pro Wrestling Noah events
- List of major DDT Pro-Wrestling events
- List of ROH pay-per-view events
- List of NWA pay-per-view events
- List of MLW events
- 2022 in Misfits Boxing
