= Kengo (wrestler) =

Japanese professional wrestler (born 1989)

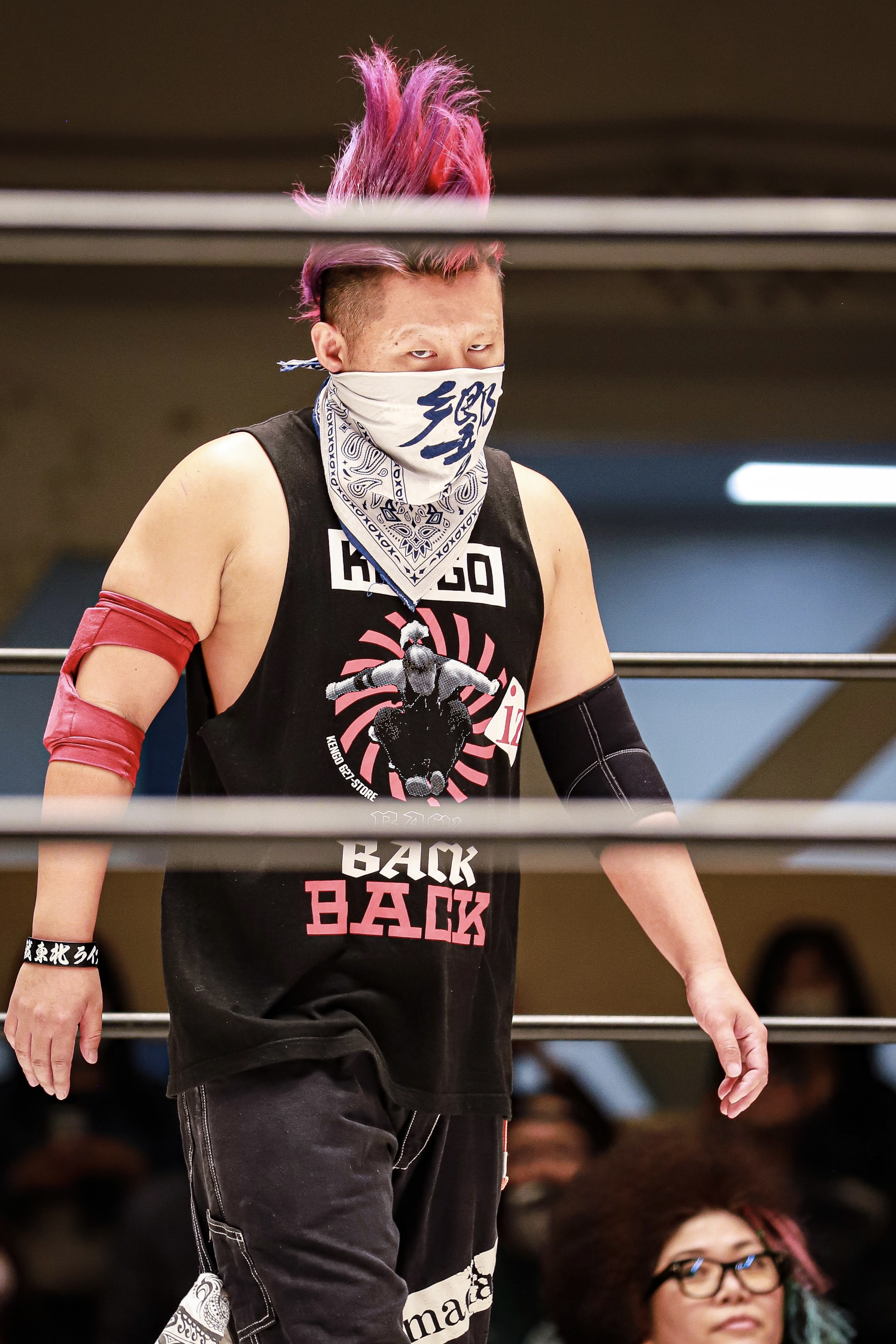
- Kengo in May 2023

Personal information
- Born: 2 September 1989 (age 37) Kameoka, Japan

Professional wrestling career
- Ring name: Kengo Nishimura Ken Tsuyoshi Kengo
- Billed height: 173 cm (5 ft 8 in)
- Billed weight: 85 kg (187 lb)
- Trained by: Tomohiko Hashimoto
- Debut: 2009

Kengo Nishimura (西村 賢吾, Nishimura Kengo; born 2 September 1989) better known mononymously by his ring name Kengo is a Japanese professional wrestler currently working as a freelancer and is best known for his tenures with Michinoku Pro Wrestling, Tenryu Project and Pro Wrestling Freedoms.

== Professional wrestling career ==
=== Japanese independent circuit (2009–present) ===
Nishimura made his professional wrestling debut at a house show promoted by Riki Office on May 6, 2009, where he fell short to Hideaki Sumi in singles competition.

==== New Japan Pro Wrestling (2023) ====
Nishimura made several appaearances in New Japan Pro Wrestling in 2023. On the second night of the Destruction in Ryogoku from October 9, 2023, he teamed up with Takahiro Katori, Takeshi Masada, Kazuma Sumi and Jun Masaoka and unsuccessfully competed in a ten-man tag team match won by Chaos (Yoshi-Hashi, Toru Yano and Yoh), Tiger Mask and Ryusuke Taguchi. On the second night of the NJPW Independence Day event from June 5, 2023, Nishimura teamed up with Dragon Libre and Takahiro Katori in a losing effort against Oskar Leube, Yoh and Ryusuke Taguchi.

=== Pro Wrestling Zero1 (2012–2016) ===
Nishimura started competing in Pro Wrestling Zero1 in December 2012 when he joined the villainous stable of Voodoo Murders. He made his debut in the promotion at the 2013 edition of the Furinkazan where he teamed up with stablemate "brother" Yasshi and fell short to Masato Tanaka and Shinjiro Otani in the first rounds. At ZERO1 Shin-Kiba Convention on February 20, 2014, he competed in a number one contendership battle royal for the NWA World Junior Heavyweight Championship and International Junior Heavyweight Championship won by Jason Lee and also involving Ikuto Hidaka, Mineo Fujita, Mecha Wolf 450, Nosawa Rongai and Yasshi. Nishimura ended his tenure with the promotion in September 2016 when he withdrew from Voodoo Murders.

=== Michinoku Pro Wrestling (2016–2020) ===
Nishimura has had a four-year tenure with Michinoku Pro Wrestling. He made his debut in the promotion on the first night of the Michinoku Pro Michinoku Futaritabi 2016 from October 1, where he teamed up with "Bad Boy" stablemates Manjimaru and Takeshi Minamino in a losing effort against Gaina, Jinsei Shinzaki and Taro Nohashi. On November 24, 2018 at Sendai 2 Days Tour, Nishimura teamed up with Ken45° and defeated Taro Nohashi and Gaina to win both the Tohoku Tag Team Championship and the UWA World Tag Team Championship which were disputed for in a tandem at the time.

=== Pro Wrestling Freedoms (2020–present) ===
Another promotion in which Nishimura competes is Pro Wrestling Freedoms. At FREEDOMS Go Beyond The Limit 2022 on February 3, he teamed up with Yuya Susumu and unsuccessfully challenged Tomoya Hirata and Toru Sugiura for the King of Freedom World Tag Team Championship. At FREEDOMS Doms Yokohama Budokan First Advance ~ Hot Free People 2022 on May 3, he defeated Tatsuhito Takaiwa to win the UWA World Junior Heavyweight Championship, title which was under the jurisdiction of Freedoms at the time.

=== Tenryu Project (2020–present) ===
Nishimura made his debut in Tenryu Project at Tenryu Project Kakumei Densho on November 15, 2020, where he teamed up with Kengo Mashimo and Minoru Suzuki in a losing effort against Hikaru Sato, Ryuichi Kawakami and Yuji Hino.

During his time with the promotion, Nishimura chased for various accomplishments. He won the Tenryu Project International Junior Heavyweight Championship, the top title of the promotion for the first time at Survive the Revolution Vol. 8 on August 13, 2021 by defeating Hub. He won the Tenryu Project WAR World 6-Man Tag Team Championship for the first time at Still Revolution Vol. 3 on June 20, 2023 by teaming up with Gaina and Kouki Iwasaki to defeat Kenichiro Arai, Kohei Sato and Masayuki Kono. As for the Tenryu Project International Junior Heavyweight Tag Team Championship, Nishimura won the titles for the first time alongside Yuya Susumu on October 15, 2024 at Light My Fire Vol. 7 by defeating Naoki Tanizaki and Yusuke Kodama. After the win, Nishimura became the second Triple Crown champion in the promotion after Hikaru Sato.

He competed in the Ryūkon Cup which is the signature annual event of the promotion. He made his first appearance at the 2021 edition where he defeated Mizuki Watase in the first rounds and Leona in the second ones, only to fall short to Toru in the semifinals. He scored his best result at the 2023 edition from which he emerged victorious by defeating Kouki Iwasaki in the first rounds, Naoki Tanizaki in the second ones, Hikaru Sato in the semifinals and Keita Yano in the finals. Nishimura also competed in the 2024 edition in which he defeated Oji Shiiba in the first rounds, Jun Masaoka in the second ones but fell short to Yuya Susumu in the quarterfinals.

== Championships and accomplishments ==
- Active Advance Pro Wrestling
  - 2AW Tag Team Championship (1 time) – with Ayumu Honda
- Apache Pro-Wrestling Army
  - WEW World Tag Team Championship (1 time) – with Tomohiko Hashimoto
- Itabashi Pro Wrestling
  - Itabashi Tag Team Championship (1 time) – with Wolf Tomoya
- Michinoku Pro Wrestling
  - Tohoku Tag Team Championship (1 time) – with Ken45°
  - UWA World Tag Team Championship (1 time) – with Ken45°
- Mobius
  - Apex Of Triangle Championship (1 time) – with Yoshikazu Taru and Yasshi
- Pro Wrestling Freedoms
  - King of Freedom World Junior Heavyweight Championship (1 time)
  - UWA World Junior Heavyweight Championship (2 times)
  - Junior Freedom Tournament (2026)
- Tenryu Project
  - Tenryu Project International Junior Heavyweight Championship (1 time)
  - Tenryu Project International Junior Heavyweight Tag Team Championship (1 time) – Yuya Susumu
  - Tenryu Project WAR World 6-Man Tag Team Championship (3 times) – with Gaina and Kouki Iwasaki (1), Minoru Suzuki and Yasshi (1) and Masayuki Kono and Yuya Susumu
  - Ryūkon Cup (2023)
  - Second Triple Crown Champion
