= Kinya Oyanagi =

Japanese professional wrestler

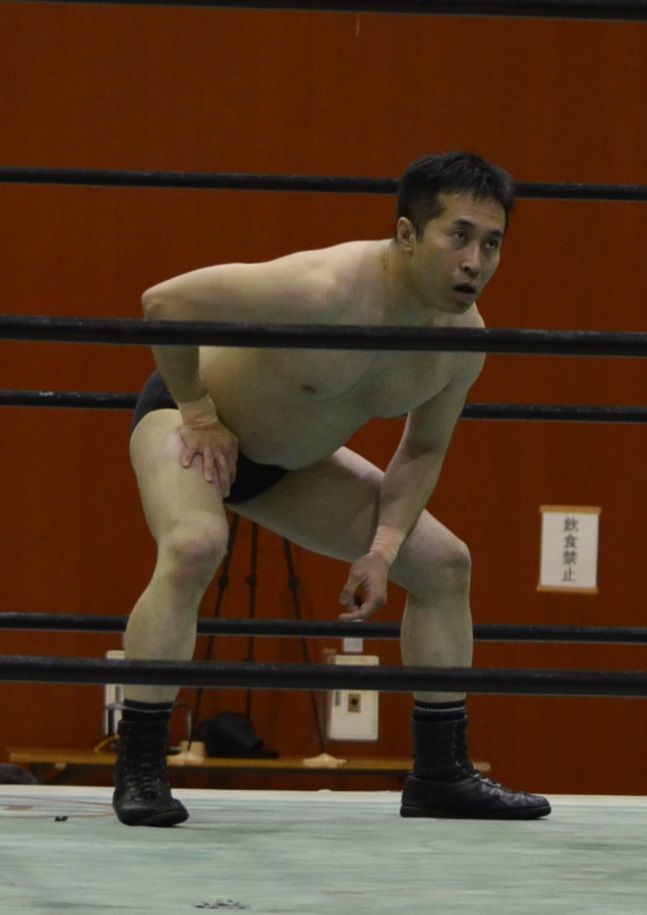
- Oyanagi in May 2014

Personal information
- Born: April 26, 1976 (age 50) Aomori, Japan

Professional wrestling career
- Ring name(s): Billy Oyanagi; Kinya Oyanagi; Nitohei Oyanagi; Omachi Man; Superman Kinya
- Billed height: 172 cm (5 ft 8 in)
- Billed weight: 76 kg (168 lb)
- Trained by: Último Dragón; Jorge Rivera
- Debut: September 2, 2000
- Retired: November 3, 2016

Kinya Oyanagi (大柳 錦也, Ōyanagi Kinya) (born April 26, 1976) is a Japanese retired professional wrestler. He has worked extensely in Toryumon Japan and Michinoku Pro Wrestling, where he is a former Tohoku Tag Team champion along with Kesen Numajiro.

== Career ==
=== Toryumon (2000–2003) ===
Oyanagi trained in the Último Dragón Gym and graduated in the 6th Toryumon school class term, debuting in Toryumon Mexico at the same year. Going under the name of Nitohei Oyanagi (nitohei meaning recruit) and the gimmick of a Japanese holdout soldier, he was a comedy wrestler who saluted in every movement and often performed military routines on the ring, to his opponents's chagrin. Even although he was a low-carder, he was sent with class ace Milano Collection A.T. and Yasushi Tsujimoto to the Asistencia Asesoria y Administracion event Verano de Escándalo, where they faced Los Barrio Boys (Alan, Billy Boy and Decnis) in a no contest. In 2001, Oyanagi and his class were sent to Japan for the Toryumon 2000 Project, where they showed their "llave" Mexican grappling style. He feuded with Taru and traded wins with him, eventually reverting to his true name and adopting the gimmick of a cram student who brought a textbook with him to the ring and studied during holds. Taru also brought his mini version wrestler, Tarucito, to counter Oyanagi's antics, while Kinya teamed up with Takamichi Iwasa. Oyanagi also feuded with Pescatore Yagi, beating him twice. In 2003, he suffered an injury and had to stay away from the rings, time in which he retired from Toryumon and wrestling altogether to spend time with his family, working as a land and house investigator.

=== Dragondoor and El Dorado Wrestling (2005–2008) ===
In 2005, Oyanagi came from retirement for Dragondoor, appearing in backstage vignettes where he wore a businessman suit and talked about economy, eventually switching to a ragged suit to symbolize the promotion's future when sponsor Livedoor retired his help. After Dragondoor folded up and became El Dorado Wrestling, Oyanagi finally returned to in-ring action, wrestling this time as a Densha Otoko-inspired otaku character who used anime merchandising in his matches. He also went as Billy Oyanagi, a parody of Billy Blanks. However, after his old enemy Taru gave him a beatdown and advised him to take wrestling seriously, Oyanagi dropped his comedy characters and announced that he was going to go "strong-style". He adopted plain black tights and wrestling shoes, in the tradition of old-fashioned wrestlers like Antonio Inoki and Yoshiaki Fujiwara, and became a mat wrestling technician, capitalizing on his grappling skills and flexibility to overwhelm his opponents and counter any movement. Now as a serious menace, he allied with Toru Owashi's faction Animal Planets and went against the heel Hell Demons, having also and on/off alliance with Kagetora. When El Dorado folded in 2008, he joined its next incarnation, Secret Base, as a regular member, but officially signing up with Michinoku Pro Wrestling.

=== Michinoku Pro Wrestling (2008–2016) ===
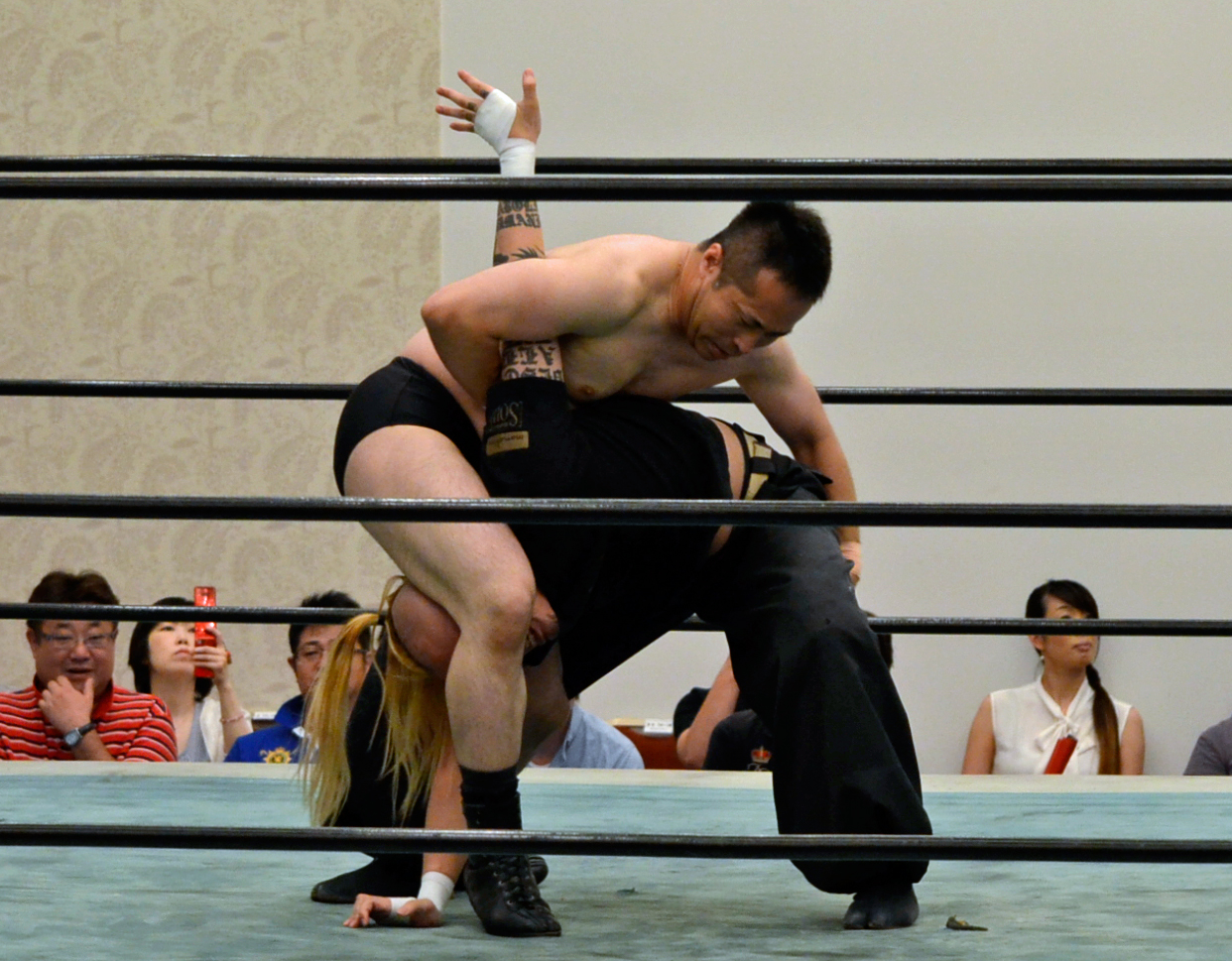
Oyanagi executing an octopus hold on Manjimaru.

Oyanagi, now and ever under his technician persona, debuted in Michinoku Pro forming a tag team with Kesen Numajiro and capturing shockingly the Tohoku Tag Team Championship from Kowloon (Kei and Shu Sato). Their success was short-lived, as they were eliminated from the Michinoku Tag League 2009 by another team of Kowloon (Hayato Fujita and Rasse) and ended losing the title in two months to stable members Maguro Ooma and Takeshi Minamino. Oyanagi and Numajiro kept teaming up for a time against the heel stable, but it was Oyanagi alone who gained a title shot for the Tohoku Junior Heavyweight Championship against Rui Higuaji. He kept wrestling in low profile matches through 2010 and 2011, excluding a better performance along with Jinsei Shinzaki in the Michinoku Tag Tournament 2012, where they eliminated Yapper Man #1 and Yapper Man #2 before falling to Minamino and Manjimaru. His break came in 2014, wrestling Hayato Fujita to a draw during the Tohoku Junior Heavyweight Title Tournament and challenging Brahman Shu for the title shortly after. He would get also a great victory by submitting The Great Sasuke in Oyanagi's anniversary event. On May 3, 2016, Kinya announced his retirement match on November 3, which took place against Jinsei Shinzaki with a loss to Oyanagi.

== Championships and accomplishments ==
- Michinoku Pro Wrestling

- Tohoku Tag Team Championship (1 time) – with Kesen Numajiro

- Secret Base Six Man Tag Team Tournament (2011) – with Jun Ogawauchi & Ken45º
