= UWA World Tag Team Championship =

Professional wrestling tag team championship

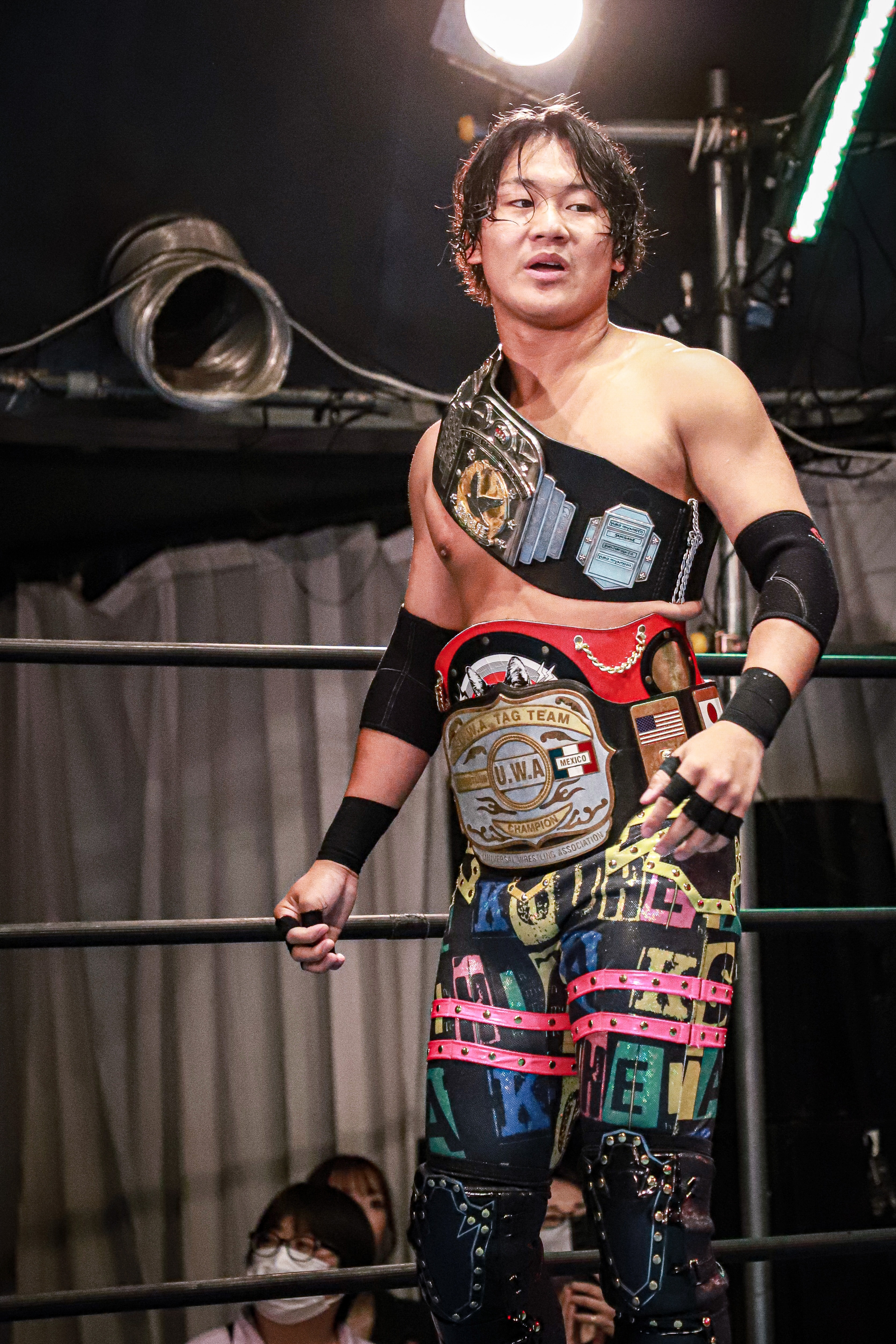
- Kohei Kinoshita with one of the titles around his waist in 2023

Details
- Promotion: El Dorado Wrestling; Kohaku Wrestling Wars; Michinoku Pro Wrestling; Union Pro Wrestling; Universal Wrestling Association; Big Japan Pro Wrestling; Pro-Wrestling Basara (current)
- Date established: 1982
- Current champions: The Brahman Brothers (Brahman Kei and Brahman Shu)
- Date won: August 1, 2026
Statistics
- First champions: Riki Choshu and Gran Hamada
- Most reigns: As a team (5 reigns): Speed of Sounds (Tsutomu Oosugi/Yapper Man 2 and Hercules Senga/Yapper Man 1); As an individual (5 reigns): Hercules Senga/Yapper Man 1; Tsutomu oosugi/Yapper Man 2
- Longest reign: Los Villanos (Villano IV and Villano V) (925–1,441 days)
- Shortest reign: Gran Hamada and Kendo (<1 day)

The UWA World Tag Team Championship is a tag team professional wrestling championship created by the Mexican Universal Wrestling Association (UWA) and defended there until the UWA closed in 1995. After the UWA's closing, the title was inactive until 2008, when El Dorado Wrestling revived the title. On March 26, 2008, Kagetora and Kota Ibushi won the title in Tokyo, Japan at El Dorado's Eye of the Treasure event, defeating Mazada and Nosawa. It has since been defended in several promotions, including Kohaku Wrestling Wars, Michinoku Pro Wrestling and Union Pro Wrestling. There have been a total of 39 reigns shared between 29 different teams consisting of 54 distinctive champions. The current champions are The Brahman Brothers (Brahman Kei and Brahman Shu) who are in their third reign as a team.

As it was a professional wrestling championship, the championship was not won not by actual competition, but by a scripted ending to a match determined by the bookers and match makers. (Note: Hornbaker (2016) p. 550: "Professional wrestling is a sport in which match finishes are predetermined. Thus, win–loss records are not indicative of a wrestler's genuine success based on their legitimate abilities – but on now much, or how little they were pushed by promoters") On occasion the promotion declares a championship vacant, which means there is no champion at that point in time. This can either be due to a storyline, (Note: Duncan & Will (2000) p. 271, Chapter: Texas: NWA American Tag Team Title [World Class, Adkisson] "Championship held up and rematch ordered because of the interference of manager Gary Hart") or real life issues such as a champion suffering an injury being unable to defend the championship, (Note: Duncan & Will (2000) p. 20, Chapter: (United States: 19th Century & widely defended titles – NWA, WWF, AWA, IW, ECW, NWA) NWA/WCW TV Title "Rhodes stripped on 85/10/19 for not defending the belt after having his leg broken by Ric Flair and Ole & Arn Anderson") or leaving the company. (Note: Duncan & Will (2000) p. 201, Chapter: (Memphis, Nashville) Memphis: USWA Tag Team Title "Vacant on 93/01/18 when Spike leaves the USWA.")

== Title history ==
Key
No.	Overall reign number
Reign	Reign number for the specific team—reign numbers for the individuals are in parentheses, if different
Days	Number of days held
Defenses	Number of successful defenses
N/A	Unknown information
(NLT)	Championship change took place "no later than" the date listed
†	Championship change is unrecognized by the promotion
<1	Reign lasted less than a day
+	Current reign is changing daily

No.	Champion	Championship change			Reign statistics			Notes	Ref.
No.	Champion	Date	Event	Location	Reign	Days	Defenses	Notes	Ref.
Universal Wrestling Association
1	Riki Choshu and Gran Hamada	August 1, 1982	UWA Live Event	Naucalpan, Mexico	1	(Note: The exact date on which the championship was abandoned is unknown, which means the title reign lasted between 884 and 1,248 days.)	1 (Note: There was only recorded defense which took place on September 19, 1982 against Perro Aguayo and Sangre Chicana. The exact number of defenses in this reign is unknown.)	Defeated Baby Face and El Canek to become the inaugural champions.	
—	Vacated	1985 (NLT)	—	—	—	—	—	Championship vacated for undocumented reasons, abandoned by the UWA at this time	
2	Los Brazos (Brazo de Oro and Brazo de Plata)	March 10, 1991	UWA Live Event	Tokyo, Japan	1	75	2	Defeated Perro Aguayo and Gran Hamada to win the vacant championship	
3	Gran Hamada and Perro Aguayo	June 13, 1991	UWA Live Event	Tokyo, Japan	1 (2, 1)	220	0		
—	Vacated	January 19, 1992	—	—	—	—	—	The title was vacated on January 19, 1992, after Perro Aguayo began working for Consejo Mundial de Lucha Libre on a regular basis	
4	Gran Hamada and Kendo	January 19, 1992	UWA Live Event	Tokyo, Japan	1 (3, 1)	<1	0	Defeated Los Brazos (Brazo de Oro and Brazo de Plata) to win the vacant championship.	
5	Los Cowboys (Silver King and El Texano)	January 19, 1992	UWA Live Event	Tokyo, Japan	1	161	3		
6	The Can-Am Express (Dan Kroffat and Doug Furnas)	June 28, 1992	UWA Live Event	Naucalpan, Mexico	1	133	3		
7	Los Villanos (Villano IV and Villano V)	November 8, 1992	UWA Live Event	Naucalpan, Mexico	1	119	2		
†	The Can-Am Express (Doug Furnas and Dan Kroffat)	March 7, 1993	UWA Live Event	Naucalpan, Mexico	—	(Note: The exact date on which The Can-Am Connection lost the championship is unknown, which means the title reign lasted between 25 and 54 days.)	2		
†	Los Villanos (Villano IV and Villano V)	April 1993 (NLT)	UWA Live Event	Mexico	—	(Note: The exact date on which Los Villanos won the championship is unknown and the exact date the UWA Closed is uncertain, which means the title reign lasted between 611 and 1,004 days.)	N/A		
—	Deactivated	1995 (NLT)	—	—	—	—	—	The UWA Closed and the titles were abandoned.	
†	Los Rayos Tapatío (Rayo Tapatío I and Rayo Tapatío II)	—N/a	—N/a	—N/a	—	—N/a	—N/a	Los Rayos Tapatío began defending a title they claimed was the UWA World Tag Team Championship around 2000. They held the Distrito Federal Tag Team Championship and could possibly have made this claim to allow them to defend a championship outside of the Distrito Federal. It was never confirmed that they had physical possession of the original UWA title belts.	
†	Los Villanos (Villano IV and Villano V)	2004 (NLT)		—	—	(Note: The exact date on which Los Villanos started defending the championship again is unknown, which means the continued title reign lasted between 1 and 3,659 days.)	N/A	Los Villanos began defending the UWA title again no later than 2004, at this point it was not sanctioned by a promotion but Los Villanos personal championship	
8	Emilio Charles Jr. and Scorpio Jr.	April 7, 2004	Live event	Acapulco, Mexico	1	7	0		
9	Los Villanos (Villano IV and Villano V)	April 14, 2004	Live event	Acapulco, Mexico	2	(Note: The exact date on which Los Villanos stopped promoting the vacated the championship is unknown, which means the title reign lasted between 925 and 1,441 days.)	N/A		
—	Deactivated	October 26, 2006	—	Pachuca, Mexico	—	—	—	Last known title defense for Los Villanos. After this the UWA title belts were not seen in Mexico again	
10	Tokyo Gurentai (Nosawa Rongai and Mazada)	2008 (NLT)	N/A	N/A	1	(Note: It is most likely that Mazada and Nosawa made up the story of winning the championship to legitimize their claim.)	0	Nosawa and Mazada proclaimed themselves as UWA World Tag Team Champions, claiming they had defeated Los Rayos Tapatío in July 2000 to win the championship. At this point the championship became the tag title for El Dorado Wrestling.	
Pro-Wrestling El Dorado
11	Kagetora and Kota Ibushi	March 26, 2008	Live event	Tokyo, Japan	1	(Note: The exact date on which the championship was vacated is unknown, which means the title reign lasted between 1 and 243 days.)	1		
—	Vacated	2008 (NLT)	—	—	—	—	—	Championship vacated due to inactivity.	
12	Speed of Sounds (Tsutomu Oosugi and Hercules Senga)	November 25, 2008	Face Busta Vol. 12	Tokyo, Japan	1	8	0	Defeated Jumping Kid Okimoto and Kagetora at Face Busta Vol. 12 in a decision match.	
13	The Brahman Brothers (Brahman Kei and Brahman Shu)	December 3, 2008	Live event	Tokyo, Japan	1	497	1		
Kohaku Pro-Wrestling Wars
14	Speed of Sounds (Tsutomu Oosugi and Hercules Senga)	April 14, 2010	Live event	Tokyo, Japan	2	252	N/A		
15	Masamune and Minoru Fujita	December 22, 2010	Live event	Tokyo, Japan	1	344	N/A		
16	Speed of Sounds (Tsutomu Oosugi and Hercules Senga)	December 1, 2011	Live event	Tokyo, Japan	3	667	N/A		
†	Ikuto Hidaka and Menso-re Oyaji	November 29, 2012	Live event	Tokyo, Japan	—	228	N/A	Unrecognized by Michinoku Pro Wrestling.	
†	Speed of Sounds (Tsutomu Oosugi and Hercules Senga)	July 15, 2013	Live event	Osaka, Japan	—	205	N/A	Unrecognized by Michinoku Pro Wrestling.	
17	Hiroki and Yasu Urano	February 5, 2014	Live event	Tokyo, Japan	1	81	1		
Union Pro-Wrestling
18	Hiroshi Fukuda and Men's Teioh	April 27, 2014	Live event	Yokohama, Japan	1	126	2		
19	Fuma and Isami Kodaka	August 31, 2014	Live event	Tokyo, Japan	1	146	3		
20	Masato Shibata and Shuji Ishikawa	January 24, 2015	Live event	Yokohama, Japan	1	144	1		
21	The Brahman Brothers (Brahman Kei and Brahman Shu)	June 17, 2015	Live event	Tokyo, Japan	2	359	0		
Michinoku Pro-Wrestling
22	Ikuto Hidaka and Minoru Fujita	June 10, 2016	Live event	Tokyo, Japan	1 (1, 2)	463	2	This match was also contested for the Tohoku Tag Team Championship.	
23	Super Stars (Ayumu Gunji and Rui Hiugaji)	September 16, 2017	Live event	Yahaba, Japan	1	183	1	This match was also contested for the Tohoku Tag Team Championship.	
24	Gaina and Taro Nohashi	March 18, 2018	Konzen Ittai	Sendai, Japan	1	251	2	This match was also contested for the Tohoku Tag Team Championship.	
25	Bad Boy (Ken45° and Kengo)	November 24, 2018	Sendai 2 Days	Yahaba, Japan	1	163	2	This match was also contested for the Tohoku Tag Team Championship.	
26	Gaina and Taro Nohashi	May 6, 2019	Golden Week Series 2019	Yahaba, Japan	2	39	0	This match was also contested for the Tohoku Tag Team Championship.	
27	Ikuto Hidaka and Minoru Fujita	June 14, 2019	Michinoku 2019 Tokyo Conference Vol. 3	Tokyo, Japan	2 (2, 3)	127	1	This match was also contested for the Tohoku Tag Team Championship.	
28	Yapper Man #1 and Yapper Man #2	October 19, 2019	Michinoku 2019 Tokyo Conference Vol. 6	Tokyo, Japan	4	563	2	This match was also contested for the Tohoku Tag Team Championship. Formerly held the title under the name Speed Of Sounds (Hercules Senga and Tsutomu Oosugi).	
29	Skull & Bones (Jinsei Shinzaki and The Great Sasuke)	May 4, 2021	Michinoku Pro Golden Week Tour 2021	Yahaba, Japan	1	152	2	This match was also contested for the Tohoku Tag Team Championship.	
30	Gaina and Taro Nohashi	October 3, 2021	Michinoku Pro Dojo Pro-Wrestling	Kobe, Japan	3	245	2		
Big Japan Pro Wrestling
31	Hub and Eisa8	June 5, 2022	BJW Perfect Style 2022	Osaka, Japan	1	251	3		
32	Kohei Kinoshita and Yasshi	February 11, 2023	BJW Osaka Surprise 64 ~ Glory Members 2023	Osaka, Japan	1	316	3		
33	Speed of Sounds (Tsutomu Oosugi and Hercules Senga)	December 24, 2023	BJW Osaka Surprise 70 ~ Big Thanksgiving 2023	Osaka, Japan	5	77	0		
34	Kaji Tomato and Kota Sekifuda	March 10, 2024	BJW Osaka Surprise 71 ~ Shikyosotei no Jin	Osaka, Japan	1	185	4		
Pro-Wrestling Basara
35	Aijin Tag (Masato Kamino and Takato Nakano)	September 11, 2024	BASARA Tsukamoto & Nakatsu Anniversary Festival	Osaka, Japan	1	41	1		
36	Hideyoshi Kamitani and Isami Kodaka	October 22, 2024	BASARA 259 ~ Utage	Osaka, Japan	1 (1, 2)	336	1		
37	Andy Wu and Yasufumi Nakanoue	September 23, 2025	BJW Osaka Surprise 81 ~ A Comeback In 2025	Osaka, Japan	1	153	0		
38	Masaki Morihiro and Yuya Aoki	February 23, 2026	BJW	Yokohama, Japan	1	159	0		
39	The Brahman Brothers (Brahman Kei and Brahman Shu)	August 1, 2026	BJW Shopping Street Pro Wrestling 2026 ~ Love, Peace & Deathmatch	Yokohama, Japan	3	62+	0		

== Combined reigns ==
As of October 2, 2026.

†	Indicates the current champion
¤	The exact length of at least one title reign is uncertain.

=== By team ===
Rank	Team	No. of reigns	Combined defenses	Combined days
1	Speed of Sounds/Yapper Man #1 and Yapper Man #2 (Tsutomu Oosugi and Hercules Senga)	5	2¤	1,567
2	Los Villanos (Villano IV and Villano V)	2	2¤	1,044¤
3	The Brahman Brothers † (Brahman Kei and Brahman Shu)	3	1	918+
4	Ikuto Hidaka and Minoru Fujita	2	3	590
5	Gaina and Taro Nohashi	3	4	535
6	Masamune and Minoru Fujita	1	N/A¤	344
7	Hideyoshi Kamitani and Isami Kodaka	1	1	336
8	Kohei Kinoshita and Yasshi	1	3	316
9	Hub and Eisa8	1	3	251
10	Gran Hamada and Perro Aguayo	1	0	220
11	Tomato Kaji and Kota Sekifuda	1	4	185
12	Super Stars (Ayumu Gunji and Rui Hiugaji)	1	1	183
13	Bad Boy (Ken45° and Kengo)	1	2	163
14	Los Cowboys (Silver King and El Texano)	1	3	161
15	Masaki Morihiro and Yuya Aoki	1	0	159
16	Andy Wu and Yasufumi Nakanoue	1	0	153
17	Skull & Bones (Jinsei Shinzaki and The Great Sasuke)	1	2	152
18	Fuma and Isami Kodaka	1	3	146
19	Masato Shibata and Shuji Ishikawa	1	1	144
20	The Can-Am Express (Dan Kroffat and Doug Furnas)	1	3	133
21	Hiroshi Fukuda and Men's Teioh	1	2	126
22	Hiroki and Yasu Urano	1	1	81
23	Los Brazos (Brazo de Oro and Brazo de Plata)	1	2	75
24	Aijin Tag (Masato Kamino and Takato Nakano)	1	1	41
25	Emilio Charles Jr. and Scorpio Jr.	1	0	7
26	Gran Hamada and Kendo	1	0	<1
27	Kagetora and Kota Ibushi	1	1	(Note: The exact date on which the championship was vacated is unknown, which means the title reign lasted between 1 and 243 days.)¤
27	Tokyo Gurentai (Nosawa Rongai and Mazada)	1	0	(Note: It is most likely that Mazada and Nosawa made up the story of winning the championship to legitimize their claim.)¤
27	Riki Choshu and Gran Hamada	1	1	(Note: The exact date on which the championship was abandoned is unknown, which means the title reign lasted between 884 and 1,248 days.)¤

=== By wrestler ===
Rank	Wrestler	No. of reigns	Combined defenses	Combined days
1	Hercules Senga/Yapper Man #1	5	2¤	1,567
1	Tsutomu Oosugi/Yapper Man #2	5	2¤	1,567
3	Villano IV	2	2¤	1,044¤
3	Villano V	2	2¤	1,044¤
5	Brahman Kei †	3	1	918+
5	Brahman Shu †	3	1	918+
7	Minoru Fujita	3	3¤	907
8	Ikuto Hidaka	2	3	563
9	Gaina	3	4	535
9	Taro Nohashi	3	4	535
11	Isami Kodaka	2	4	482
12	Masamune	1	N/A¤	344
13	Hideyoshi Kamitani	1	1	336
14	Kohei Kinoshita	1	3	316
14	Yasushi Tsujimoto	1	3	316
16	Hub	1	3	251
16	Eisa8	1	3	251
18	Gran Hamada	3	1	220¤
19	Perro Aguayo	1	0	220
20	Tomato Kaji	1	4	185
20	Kota Sekifuda	1	4	185
22	Ayumu Gunji	1	1	183
22	Rui Hiugaji	1	1	183
24	Ken45°	1	2	163
24	Kengo	1	2	163
26	Silver King	1	3	161
26	El Texano	1	3	161
28	Masaki Morihiro	1	0	159
28	Yuya Aoki	1	0	159
30	Andy Wu	1	0	153
30	Yasufumi Nakanoue	1	0	153
32	Jinsei Shinzaki	1	2	152
32	The Great Sasuke	1	2	152
34	Fuma	1	3	146
35	Masato Shibata	1	1	144
35	Shuji Ishikawa	1	1	144
37	Dan Kroffat	1	3	133
37	Doug Furnas	1	3	133
39	Hiroshi Fukuda	1	2	126
39	Men's Teioh	1	2	126
41	Hiroki	1	1	81
41	Yasu Urano	1	1	81
43	Brazo de Oro	1	2	75
43	Brazo de Plata	1	2	75
45	Masato Kamino	1	1	41
45	Takato Nakano	1	1	41
47	Emilio Charles Jr.	1	0	7
47	Scorpio Jr.	1	0	7
49	Kendo	1	0	<1
50	Kagetora	1	1	(Note: The exact date on which the championship was vacated is unknown, which means the title reign lasted between 1 and 243 days.)¤
50	Kota Ibushi	1	1	(Note: The exact date on which the championship was vacated is unknown, which means the title reign lasted between 1 and 243 days.)¤
50	Mazada	1	0	(Note: It is most likely that Mazada and Nosawa made up the story of winning the championship to legitimize their claim.)¤
50	Nosawa Rongai	1	0	(Note: It is most likely that Mazada and Nosawa made up the story of winning the championship to legitimize their claim.)¤
50	Riki Choshu	1	1	(Note: The exact date on which the championship was abandoned is unknown, which means the title reign lasted between 884 and 1,248 days.)¤
