= Hayato Fujita =

Japanese professional wrestler (1986)

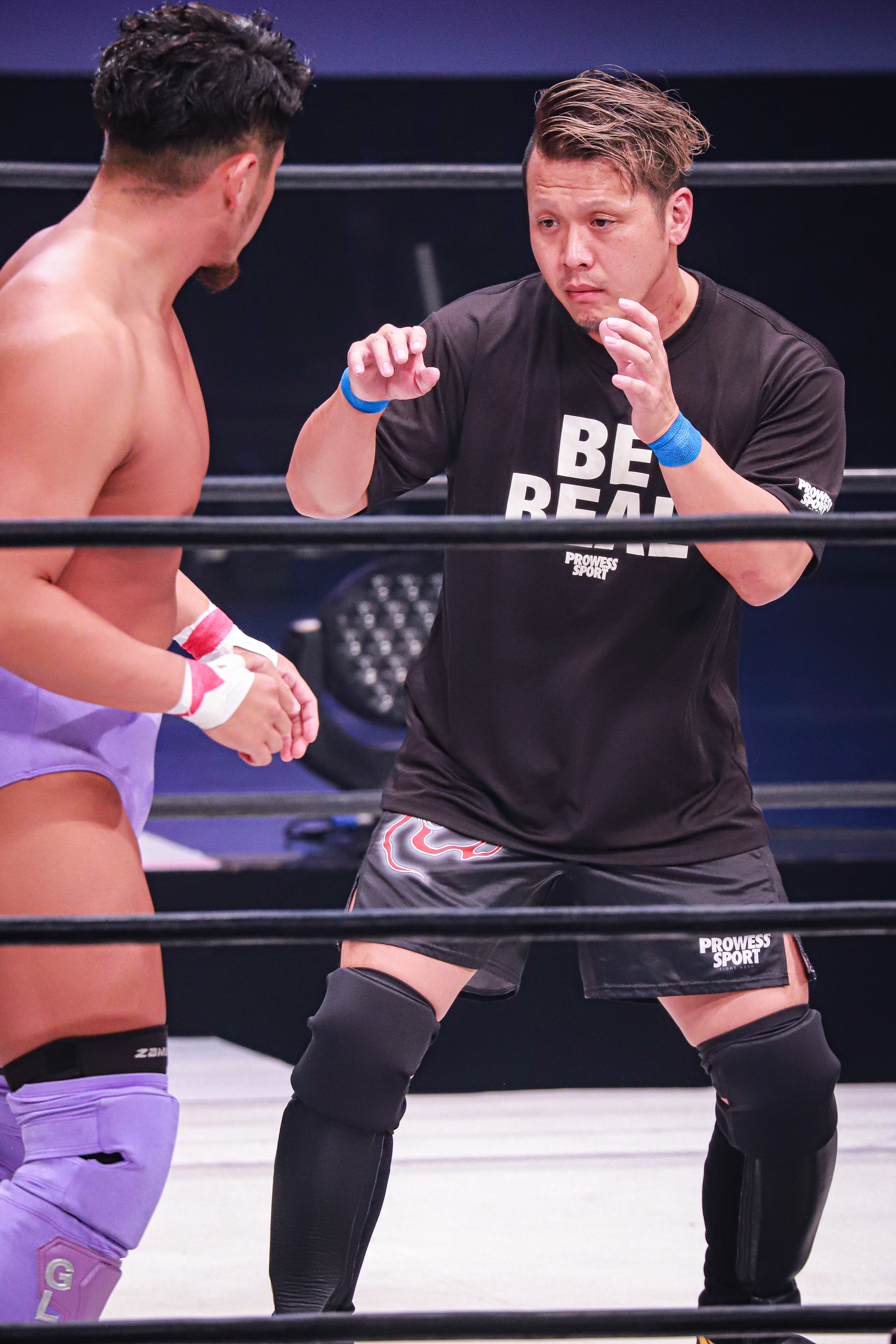
- Fujita in July 2023.

Personal information
- Born: September 20, 1986 (age 39) Adachi, Tokyo

Professional wrestling career
- Ring name: Fujita "Jr." Hayato
- Billed height: 1.75 m (5 ft 9 in)
- Billed weight: 78 kg (172 lb)
- Trained by: Jinsei Shinzaki; Norifumi Yamamoto
- Debut: December 3, 2004

Hayato Fujita (藤田 勇人 Fujita Hayato, born September 20, 1986) is a Japanese professional wrestler, better known by his ring name, Fujita "Jr." Hayato (フジタ"Jr"ハヤト). Despite his small stature and physique for a professional wrestler, he is known for his toughness and hard shoot-style strikes.

== Professional wrestling career ==
Hayato started training amateur wrestling at 8 under influence of his father, who had overcome a cerebral palsy to become a successful wrestler himself. Fujita specialized in Greco Roman wrestling and competed at national level, and it was in one of his wrestling tournaments in Tokyo that he was introduced to Michinoku Pro Wrestling (MPW) president Jinsei Shinzaki, who invited him to MPW to compete in professional wrestling. Prior to his debut, he also trained in mixed martial arts under Norifumi "KID" Yamamoto, and as a tribute to his trainer he would name his guillotine choke finishing hold the "K.I.D."

=== Michinoku Pro Wrestling (2004–2017) ===
Fujita made his pro debut on December 3, 2004, in Tokyo's Korakuen Hall, losing to fellow young wrestler Katsuhiko Nakajima. He spent 2005 training until September, when he was sent to Mexico to train at the Último Dragón Gym. The night of his farewell, at September 3, he was confronted in the ring by the heel stable Los Salseros Japoneses (Takeshi Minamino, Pineapple Hanai, Mango Fukuda) and Kesen Numajiro. The quartet proceeded to verbally attack Hayato, but Shanao, Kagetora and Gaina came to his aid and a tag team match had place, with Hayato's team winning when Shanao pinned Minamino. Leaving in a high note, Hayato reached Mexico and competed in Toryumon's Young Dragons Cup, beating Guillermo Akiba, but being eliminated by Kazuchika Okada.

In midst 2006, Hayato returned to Japan and started ascending the scale, standing out for his hard shoot-style wrestling style, which differed from the acrobatic, complex lucharesu predominantly practised in Michinoku Pro. He gave a good performance at the Tetsujin Tournament, defeating the likes of Banana Senga, Ken45º and Osaka Pro Wrestling representative Tigers Mask before being pinned by Rasse at the finals. Fujita also was sent to Osaka Pro to compete in the Tennozan Tournament, getting eliminated by Tigers Mask. Fujita initially competed as a face, opposing the heel faction STONED led by Kagetora, but after the disbandment of STONED, he eventually turned heel and joined the Kowloon stable, which had been created from its remnants. He eventually became the stable's leader over Kei and Shu Sato and Maguro Ooma.

Through 2008, Hayato wrestled against the top faces, namely Yoshitsune, Rasse and Kagetora, and went to defeat the first of them in December 2008 to win the Tohoku Junior Heavyweight Championship. He retained the title before Rasse and MPW founder The Great Sasuke, until that he lost it in September 2009 against the debuting Kenoh. Fujita and Kenoh got into a heated feud, helped by Kenoh's stiff wrestling style being highly similar to Hayato's own. Kenoh frustrated Fujita's attempts to win the Michinoku Tag League 2009 and regain the championship, while Hayato focused in commanding Kowloon until he got injured starting 2010.

After Hayato returned, however, Último Dragón joined Kowloon and took over as a leader, while the rest of members revealed they had actually been serving Dragón behind the scenes and not Fujita, who was demoted. Fujita appeared to turn face, but he stayed with Kowloon and made the better of his situation, bringing Kagetora from Dragon Gate as a new member and allying closely with Taro Nohashi. Eventually, Último Dragón sparsed his apparitions in MPW and allowed Hayato to take his functions as leader, but the venture was short, as he was betrayed again, this time by Nohashi himself. Claiming Hayato to be too weak for his place as leader, Nohashi shockingly brought Kenoh as his real ally and ordered the rest of Kowloon integrants to beat Hayato down, which they did. However, Maguro Ooma and Takeshi Minamino kept loyal to Hayato and tried to save him, only to be floored as well. While Nohashi and Kenoh declared formed the heel faction Asura, Hayato and his followers created the tweener trio Bad Boy, also known as Hayato Army, which also was joined by Ken45º.

Fujita started his revenge with a great victory, beating Kenoh to recapture the Tohoku Junior Heavyweight title, successfully defending it before Great Sasuke, Hayato's old rival Katsuhiko Nakajima, and his new enemy Ikuto Hidaka, coming from Pro Wrestling Zero1. After another great defense before Koji Kanemoto, Hayato lost the championship against to Kenoh, who vacated it in order to leave Michinoku Pro for Pro Wrestling Noah. Hayato took part in a tournament to decide the new championship, but it was won by one of Asura's former enforcers, Brahman Shu, now working for Great Sasuke as part of his cult stable Mu no Taiyo.

=== Pro Wrestling Zero1 (2009–2017) ===
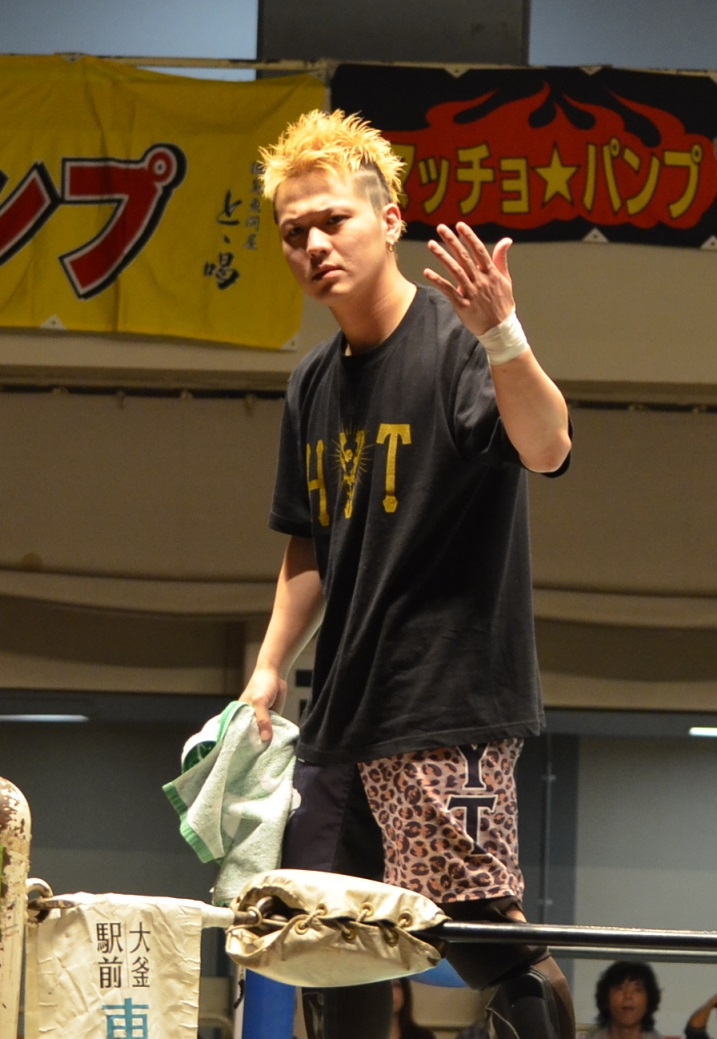
Fujita in June 2014

Hayato debuted in Pro Wrestling Zero1 as a MPW representative in October 2009, taking part in the annual Tenka-Ichi Tournament. He eliminated Munenori Sawa and Hajime Ohara, but was defeated at the semi-finals by Ikuto Hidaka. He continued appearing sporadically for the promotion, generally opposing Hidaka and his ally Takuya Sugawara.

In November 2010, Fujita returned to challenge Hidaka unsuccessfully for the ZERO1 International Junior Heavyweight Championship. Despite his loss, the matched granted the previous enemies a newfound mutual respect, and Hidaka and Fujita decided to team up for the Furinkazan Tag League 2010, in which they stood out for an acclaimed draw against Daisuke Sekimoto and Masato Tanaka.

In 2011, Hayato and Munenori Sawa competed in a tournament for the NWA International Lightweight Tag Team Championship, being eliminated by Ikuto Hidaka and Takafumi Ito. Fujita then competed at the Fire Festival 2011, standing out for a win over Masato Tanaka, and the Tenka-Ichi Junior Tournament, where he climbed to the final over Robby Heart and Mineo Fujita before being taken out by Munenori Sawa. The year would not end without a fourth participation, this time at the Furinkazan Tag League 2011, with Fujita and Masato Tanaka reaching the finals against Shinjiro Otani and Yoshikazu Yokoyama.

After a few appearances in 2012 for a short feud against Yuichiro ☆Jienotsu☆ Nagashima, Fujita returned fully to Zero1 to reunite with Hidaka, who was in search of a tag team partner. They formed the team Shin Aibou Tag, a reminiscence of Hidaka's old Aibou team with Munenori Sawa. They competed sparsely due to Fujita's scheduling in MPW, but managed to show a good performance at the Furinkazan Tag League by eliminating the teams of Takuya Sugawara and Toru Owashi and Tigers Mask and Billy Ken Kid.

At March 2014, Shin Aibou Tag took part in a triple threat tag team match for the vacant NWA International Lightweight Tag Team Championship, but it was won by Tigers and Kid. Hidaka and Fujita also challenged NWA Intercontinental Tag Team Champions Dangan Yankees (Masato Tanaka and Takashi Sugiura), but they were defeated again. However, their performance was good enough for Tanaka to invite them to be part of Dangan Yankees. Finally, Hidaka and Fujita got their hands on the NWA Lightweight titles by beating Shinjiro Otani and Tatsuhito Takaiwa. It came almost at the same time as Fujita's own solo run at the Tenka-Ichi Junior Tournament 2015, where he beat Kotaro Nasu and Yasshi before being stopped by Hidaka himself.

In 2016, Hidaka and Fujita lost their championships to Isami Kodaka and Takumi Tsukamoto in Dramatic Dream Team's Basara brand. The same year, Dangan Yankees was dismantled.

=== New Japan Pro Wrestling (2010–2011) ===
Following his debut in Zero1, Fujita debuted in New Japan Pro Wrestling as part of the 2010 Super J Tag Tournament. Teaming up with Taro Nohashi as representatives of his then stable Kowloon, they obtained a high level victory over Jushin Thunder Liger and Nobuo Yoshihashi, but were taken out by El Samurai and Koji Kanemoto. Hayato's participation in NJPW didn't stop there, though, as he then qualified for the Best Of The Super Junior XVII. His run was somewhat successful, beating the likes of Kenny Omega and Tama Tonga, though he was ultimately unable to win the tournament. He and Nohashi returned the same year for the next Super J Tag League, where they defeated the Dragon Gate team of Masaaki Mochizuki and Super Shisa as their only win.

Fujita returned in June 2011 for the next Best Of The Super Junior XVIII. He got a notable victory over Koji Kanemoto and gave tough matches against Kenny Omega, Prince Devitt and Davey Richards, yet failed at getting any more victories.

=== Hiatus (2017–2021) ===
On April 23, during a Tenka-Ichi Junior League match against Shinjiro Otani, Fujita suffered a massive injury which forced him go on a hiatus to heal. He was diagnosed with a complete rupture of the lateral collateral ligament and a partial rupture of the medial collateral ligament.

On November 24, 2018, Fujita appeared in Michinoku Pro Wrestling for the first time in over a year, where he announced he had been diagnosed with a spinal tumour, intramedullary tumor and ependymoma but vowed to return to the ring. In May 2019, he underwent surgery to partially remove the tumor in his spine. On December 13, 2019, with the blessing of his doctors, Fujita returned to the ring for one night only; losing to Kengo via knockout.

In an interview with Weekly Pro-Wrestling in January 2021, Fujita revealed his plan to retire should he not be able to return by the end of the year.

=== Return to professional wrestling (2022–present) ===
On May 10, 2022, Fujita announced his return to professional wrestling would take place at Korakuen Hall on July 1. Later it was announced he would be facing Musashi for the Tohoku Junior Heavyweight Championship. On July 1, Fujita defeated Musashi with a flurry of his signature shoot-style kicks. Whilst thanking the crowd for their support, he challenged former rival Kenoh and NJPW's Hiromu Takahashi.

On July 1, 2023, Fujita made his first appearance in Gleat at the promotion's 2nd anniversary event. He defeated Takanori Ito in a UWF rules match to win the Lidet UWF World Championship. On December 30, at Gleat Ver.7, he successfully defended the title against Minoru Tanaka.

On June 21, 2024, a recurrence of cancer forced him to relinquish both the Tohoku Junior Heavyweight and Lidet UWF World Championships.

== Championships and accomplishments ==
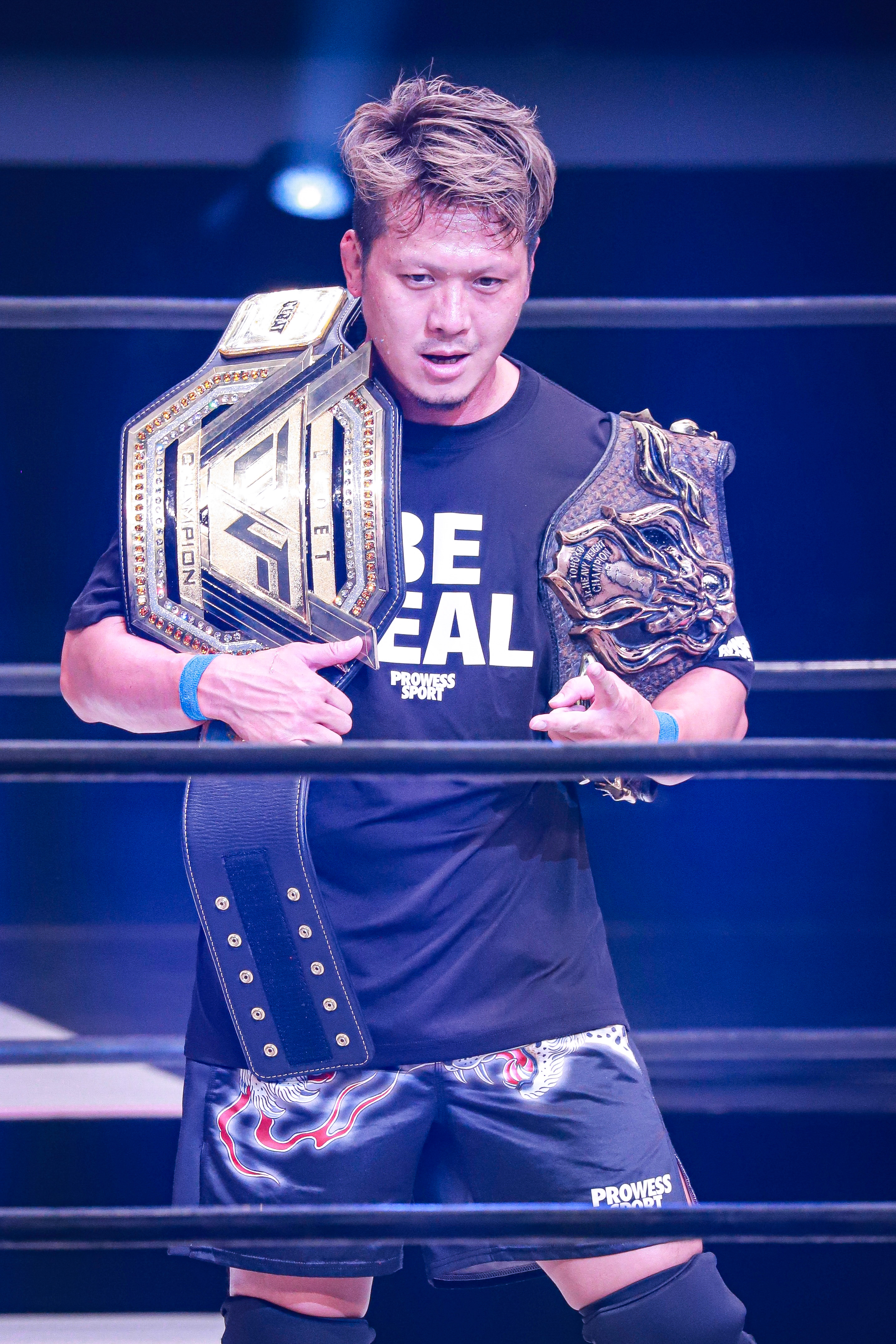
In Gleat, Fujita is a former Lidet UWF World Champion

- Dragon Gate
  - Mochizuki Buyuden Tag Tournament (2008) – with Munenori Sawa
- Futen
  - One Night Tag Tournament (2008) – with Takeshi Ono
- Gleat
  - Lidet UWF World Championship (1 time)
- Japan Indie Awards
  - Best Bout Award (2022) vs. Musashi (Michinoku Pro, July 1)
- Michinoku Pro Wrestling
  - Tohoku Junior Heavyweight Championship (3 times)
  - Tetsujin Tournament (2009)
- Pro Wrestling Illustrated
  - Ranked No. 104 of the top 500 singles wrestlers in the PWI 500 in 2013
- Pro Wrestling Zero1
  - NWA International Lightweight Tag Team Championship (1 time) – with Ikuto Hidaka
  - Furinkazan (2011) – with Masato Tanaka

== Filmography ==
=== Movies ===
Year	English Title	Japanese Title	Role
2008	Gachi Boy	ガチ☆ボーイ	Silver Jiro Ando / Shirakanzu No. 2
