= Tohoku Junior Heavyweight Championship =

Professional wrestling championship

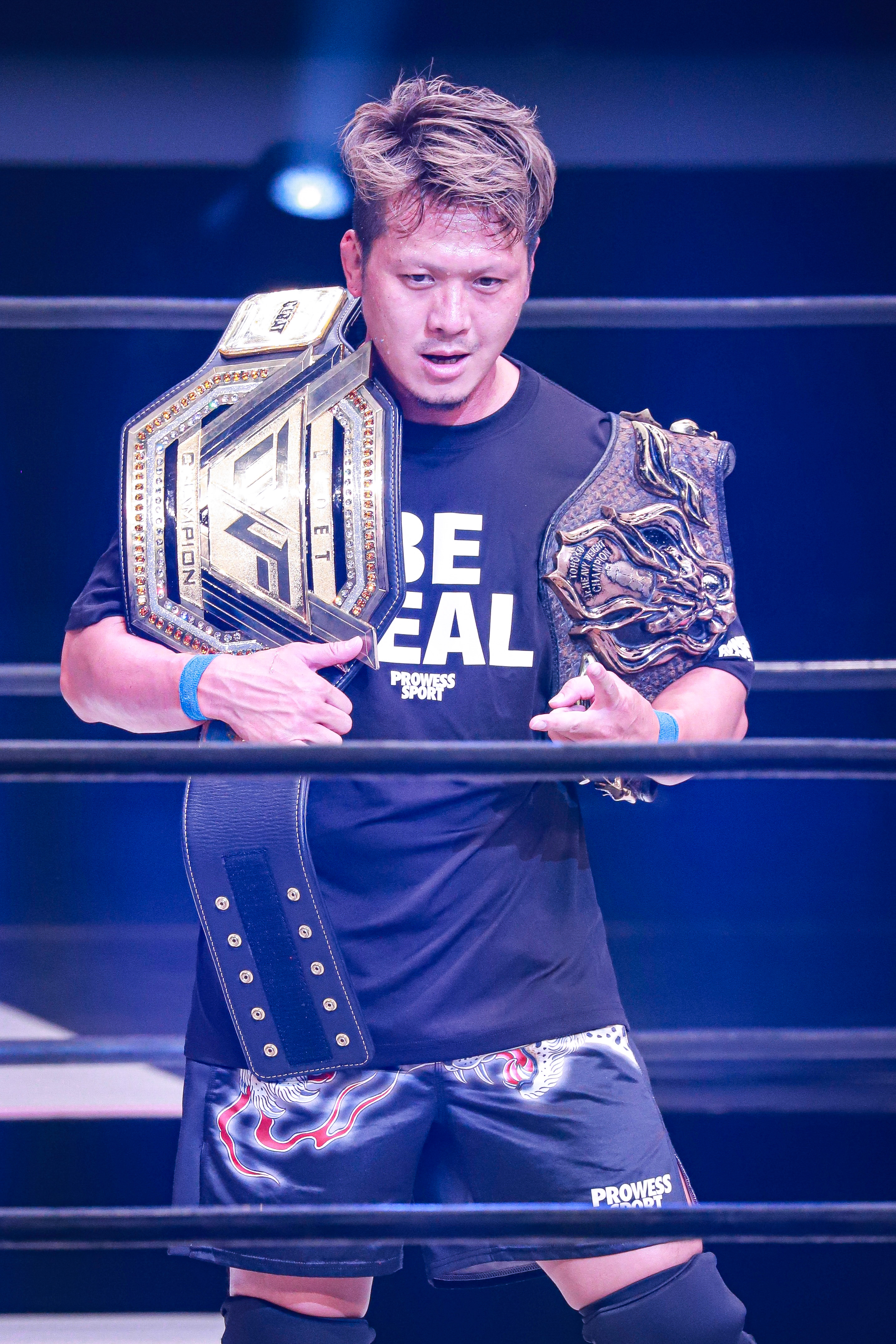
- Fujita "Jr." Hayato with the title belt on his left shoulder

Details
- Promotion: Michinoku Pro Wrestling
- Date established: August 25, 2002
- Current champion: Sangre Azteca Jr.
- Date won: March 21, 2026
Statistics
- First champion: Dick Togo
- Most reigns: Rui Hyugaji (4 reigns)
- Longest reign: Fujita "Jr." Hayato (721 days)
- Shortest reign: Kagetora (<1 day)

The Tohoku Junior Heavyweight Championship (東北ジュニアヘビー級王座, Tōhoku junia hebī-kyū ōza) is a professional wrestling championship contested in Michinoku Pro Wrestling, where it is the primary singles title, and is strictly for junior heavyweights. It was created on August 25, 2002, when Dick Togo defeated Tiger Mask in a round-robin tournament final.

== Title history ==
A round-robin tournament took place to crown the inaugural tournament and the tournament took place between July 20 and August 25, 2002. The final took place at the 10th Anniversary Show of the promotion on July 25, where Dick Togo defeated Tiger Mask in the tournament final.

Final standings
Wrestler	Score
Dick Togo	23
Tiger Mask	23
Ikuto Hidaka	21
Curry Man	21
Gran Naniwa	20
The Great Sasuke	20
Pentagon Black	19
Metal Master	18
Masao Orihara	18
Hideki Nishida	13
Tsubo Genjin	12
Tomohiro Ishii	12
Kazuya Yuasa	11
Macho Pimp	5
Jody Fleisch	4
Chinnen Hokkai	0

Final
1	Dick Togo	Pin
2	Tiger Mask	14:47

== Reigns ==
Key
No.	Overall reign number
Reign	Reign number for the specific champion
Days	Number of days held
Defenses	Number of successful defenses
<1	Reign lasted less than a day
+	Current reign is changing daily

No.	Champion	Championship change			Reign statistics			Notes	Ref.
No.	Champion	Date	Event	Location	Reign	Days	Defenses	Notes	Ref.
1	Dick Togo	August 25, 2002	10th Anniversary: Michi Pro Love II	Sendai, Japan	1	366	2	Defeated Tiger Mask in a tournament final to become the inaugural champion.	
2	Atlantis	August 26, 2003	Fukumen World League 2003	Sapporo, Japan	1	215	4	Billed as Asia Light Heavyweight Championship (Campeonato Semicompleto de Asia) during defenses in Mexico's CMLL.	
3	The Great Sasuke	March 28, 2004	Lucha Baka Diary 2004	Sendai, Japan	1	328	1		
4	Taka Michinoku	February 19, 2005	K-Dojo Club-K Tour in Shiwa	Shiwa, Japan	1	381	6	This match was also for Taka's AJPW World Junior Heavyweight Championship and Strongest-K Championship.	
—	Vacated	March 7, 2006	—	—	—	—	—	Title vacated due to Taka suffering a finger injury.	
5	Kagetora	March 19, 2006	Fighting Tohoku Legend 6th: Iwate Volume	Yahaba, Japan	1	<1	0	Defeated Makoto Oishi to win the vacant title.	
—	Vacated	March 19, 2006	—	—	—	—	—	Title vacated by Kagetora to decide the championship in a tournament.	
6	Takeshi Minamino	April 23, 2006	Fighting Tohoku Legend 7th: Miyagi Volume	Sendai, Japan	1	28	0	Defeated Rasse in a tournament final to win the vacant title.	
7	Super Delfin	May 21, 2006	Osaka Pro Story #32	Osaka, Japan	1	140	2	This match was also for Super Delfin's Osaka Pro Wrestling Championship.	
8	The Great Sasuke	October 8, 2006	Fighting Tohoku Legend: The Last Chapter	Morioka, Japan	2	42	0		
9	Gaina	November 19, 2006	Michinoku Pro	Niigata, Japan	1	355	2		
10	Yoshitsune	November 9, 2007	Michinoku Pro	Yamagata, Japan	1	399	6		
11	Fujita "Jr." Hayato	December 12, 2008	Michinoku Pro	Tokyo, Japan	1	267	2		
12	Kenoh	September 5, 2009	Michinoku Pro	Yahaba, Japan	1	428	3		
13	The Great Sasuke	November 7, 2010	Michinoku Pro	Morioka, Japan	3	182	0		
14	Rui Hiugaji	May 8, 2011	Michinoku Pro	Yahaba, Japan	1	181	2		
15	Kenoh	November 5, 2011	Michinoku Pro	Yahaba, Japan	2	211	0		
16	Fujita "Jr." Hayato	June 3, 2012	Michinoku Pro	Tokyo, Japan	2	392	4		
17	Kenoh	June 30, 2013	Jinsei Shinzaki 20th Anniversary in Sendai	Sendai, Japan	3	166	3		
—	Vacated	December 13, 2013	—	—	—	—	—	Title vacated due to Kenoh wrestling in Pro Wrestling Noah.	
18	Brahman Shu	May 5, 2014	Golden Tour 2014	Yahaba, Japan	1	365	3	Defeated Manjimaru in a tournament final hardcore match to win the vacant title.	
19	Kesen Numajiro	May 5, 2015	Golden Tour 2015	Yahaba, Japan	1	182	1		
20	Manjimaru	November 3, 2015	Furinkazan in Yahaba	Yahaba, Japan	1	550	4		
21	Rui Hiugaji	May 6, 2017	Golden Tour 2017	Yahaba, Japan	2	414	1		
22	Taro Nohashi	June 24, 2018	Jinsei Shinzaki 25th Anniversary	Sendai, Japan	1	202	1		
23	Kenbai	January 12, 2019	Michinoku Pro Battle Beginning 2019	Yahaba, Japan	1	114	1		
24	Musashi	May 6, 2019	Golden Week Series 2019	Yahaba, Japan	1	250	2		
25	Rui Hiugaji	January 11, 2020	New Year Fighting Beginning 2020	Yahaba, Japan	3	553	3		
26	Musashi	July 17, 2021	Hyakka Ryōran: Junji Takehana Death 3rd Memorial Event	Takizawa, Japan	2	349	3		
27	Fujita "Jr." Hayato	July 1, 2022	Michinoku 2022 Tokyo Conference Vol. 1: Genkō Itchi	Tokyo, Japan	3	721	3		
—	Vacated	June 21, 2024	Michinoku 2024 Tokyo Conference Vol.1: Buryō Tōgen	Tokyo, Japan	—	—	—	Due to illness, Fujita "Jr." Hayato had been on a hiatus since his appearance at Wrestle Kingdom 18 on January 4, 2024. On June 21, Fujita announced he was relinquishing both the Tohoku Junior Heavyweight and Lidet UWF World Championships.	
28	Rui Hiugaji	November 16, 2024	Ichiryūman'i; Day 1	Yahaba, Japan	4	1	0	Defeated Ringo Yamaya to win the vacant title.	
29	Pantera Jr.	November 17, 2024	Ichiryūman'i; Day 2	Sendai, Japan	1	168	1		
30	Yasutaka Oosera	May 4, 2025	Michinoku Pro Golden Week Series 2025	Takizawa, Japan	1	76	0		
31	Pantera Jr.	July 19, 2025	Michinoku Pro Shobi No Kyu	Yahaba, Japan	2	245	1		
32	Musashi	March 21, 2026	Michinoku Pro 33rd Anniversary ~ Mutsu Shunto	Yahaba, Japan	3	83	1		
33	Sangre Azteca Jr.	June 12, 2026	Michinoku 2026 Tokyo Conference Vol. 1	Tokyo, Japan	1	37+	1		

== Combined reigns ==
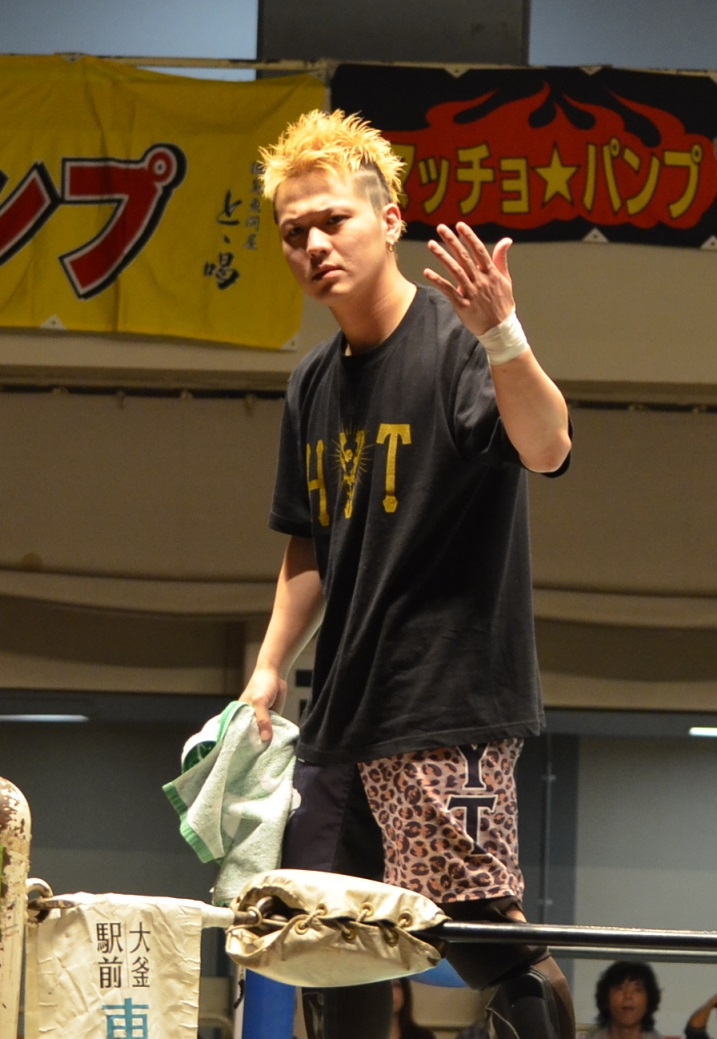
Three-time and longest-reigning (individual and combined) champion, Fujita "Jr." Hayato.

As of July 19, 2026.

†	Indicates the current champions

Rank	Wrestler	No. of reigns	Combined defenses	Combined days
1	Fujita "Jr." Hayato	3	9	1,380
2	Rui Hiugaji	4	6	1,149
3	Kenoh	3	6	805
4	Musashi	3	6	682
5	The Great Sasuke	3	1	552
6	Manjimaru	1	4	550
7	Pantera Jr.	2	2	413
8	Yoshitsune	1	6	399
9	Dick Togo	1	2	366
10	Brahman Shu	1	3	365
11	Gaina	1	2	355
12	Atlantis	1	4	215
13	Taro Nohashi	1	1	202
14	Kesen Numajiro	1	1	182
15	Super Delfin	1	2	140
16	Kenbai	1	1	114
17	Yasutaka Oosera	1	0	76
18	Sangre Azteca Jr. †	1	1	37+
19	Takeshi Minamino	1	0	28
20	Kagetora	1	0	<1

== See also ==
- Michinoku Pro Wrestling
- Tohoku Tag Team Championship
