= Rui Hiugaji =

Japanese professional wrestler

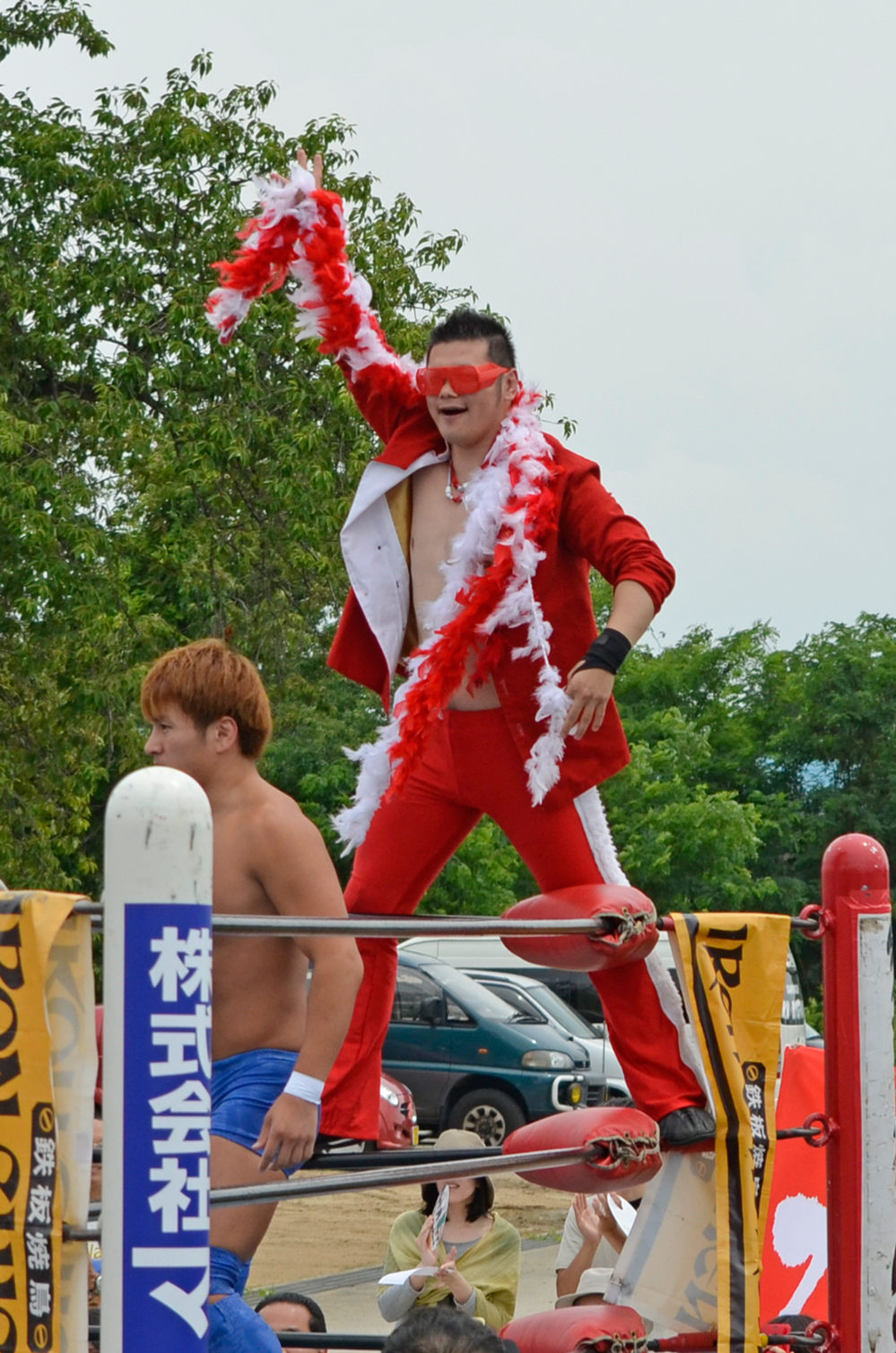
- Hiugaji in March 2016

Personal information
- Born: 22 November 1987 (age 38) Sapporo, Japan

Professional wrestling career
- Ring name: Rui Hiugaji
- Billed height: 173 cm (5 ft 8 in)
- Billed weight: 83 kg (183 lb)
- Trained by: Jinsei Shinzaki
- Debut: 2007

Rui Hiugaji (日向寺塁, Hyūgaji Rui) is a Japanese professional wrestler signed to Michinoku Pro Wrestling where he is a former Tohoku Junior Heavyweight Champion and a Tohoku Tag Team Champion. He is also known for stint tenures with various promotions from the Japanese independent scene.

== Professional wrestling career ==
=== Michinoku Pro Wrestling (2007–present) ===
Hiugaji made his professional wrestling debut in Michinoku Pro Wrestling at a house show from June 17, 2007, where he teamed up with Takayuki Aizawa and Yoshiyasu Shimizu in a losing effort against Banana Senga, Hayato Fujita and Rasse in six-man tag team competition.

During his time with the promotion, Hiugaji chased for various accomplishments. He is a former four-time Tohoku Junior Heavyweight Champion, title which he first won at a house show from May 8, 2011, by defeating The Great Sasuke. He is also a former Tohoku Tag Team Champion, title which he once held with "Super Stars" stablemate and tag team partner Ayumu Gunji.

=== Japanese independent scene (2007–present) ===
Hiugaji rarely competes in various promotions of the Japanese independent circuit as a developmental talent sent by Michinoku Pro. At Pro-Wrestling Summit in Korakuen, a cross-over independent event from December 31, 2007, he teamed up with Spark Aoki and Yuki Sato to defeat Keita Yano, Takuma Obe and Atsushi Ohashi.

Hiugaji made an appearance for Pro Wrestling Noah as part of the promotion's NOAH Northern Navigation 2014 tour of events in which he made his first appearance on the second night from June 5, 2014, where he fell short to Katsuhiko Nakajima in singles competition. At K-DOJO 14th Anniversary Club-K Super Evolution 14 on April 17, 2016, he teamed up with Musashi and unsuccessfully competed in a tag team hardcore rumble match disputed for the WEW Hardcore Tag Team Championship won by Magatsuki (Kunio Toshima and Yuma), and also involving the teams of Bozz Rengo (Kotaro Nasu and Ryuichi Sekine), SFU (Ayumu Honda and Kaji Tomato), Boso Boy Raito and Teelan Shisa, Men's Teioh and Ricky Fuji, and Masaya Takahashi and Yoshihiro Horaguchi.

== Championships and accomplishments ==
- Michinoku Pro Wrestling
  - Tohoku Junior Heavyweight Championship (4 times)
  - Tohoku Tag Team Championship (2 times, current) – with Ayumu Gunji (1) and Shigehiro Irie (1)
  - UWA World Tag Team Championship (1 time) – with Ayumu Gunji
  - Michinoku Tag Tournament (2012) – with Kenoh
