= Tohoku Tag Team Championship =

Professional wrestling tag team championship

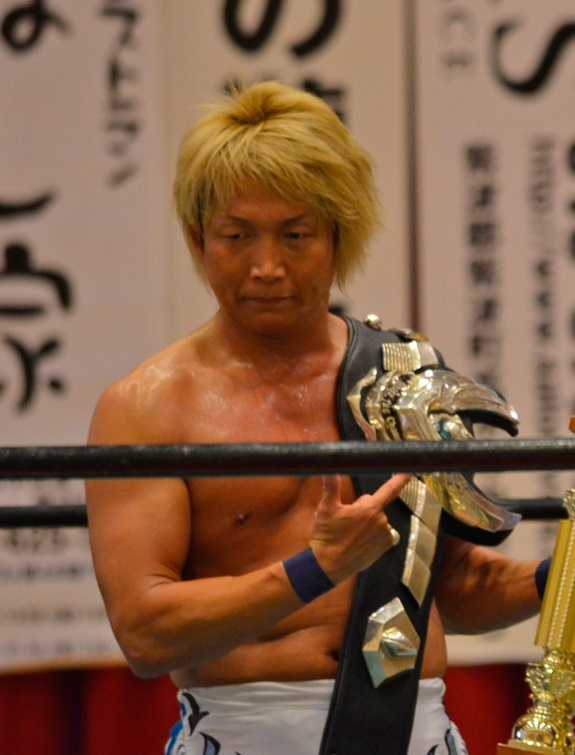
- Ikuto Hidaka carrying one of the title belts

Details
- Promotion: Michinoku Pro Wrestling
- Date established: July 17, 2004
- Current champions: Marukan Softman and Mask de Coppe
- Date won: November 1, 2026
Statistics
- First champions: Jinsei Shinzaki and Último Dragón
- Most reigns: (as a team); Shu and Kei Sato (4 reigns) (as an individual); Kei Sato/Brahman Kei and Jinsei Shinzaki (5 reigns)
- Longest reign: Ikuto Hidaka and Minoru Fujita (725 days)
- Shortest reign: Jinsei Shinzaki and Gaina (<1 day)

The Tohoku Tag Team Championship (Japanese: 東北タッグ王座, Hepburn: Tōhoku Taggu Ōza) is a professional wrestling tag team championship created and promoted by the Japanese professional wrestling promotion Michinoku Pro Wrestling.

There have been a total of 37 reigns shared between 29 different teams consisting of 37 individual champions. The current champions are Marukan Softman and Mask de Coppe who are in their first reign as a team.

== Title history ==
Key
No.	Overall reign number
Reign	Reign number for the specific team—reign numbers for the individuals are in parentheses, if different
Days	Number of days held
Defenses	Number of successful defenses
<1	Reign lasted less than a day
+	Current reign is changing daily

No.	Champion	Championship change			Reign statistics			Notes	Ref.
No.	Champion	Date	Event	Location	Reign	Days	Defenses	Notes	Ref.
1	Jinsei Shinzaki and Último Dragón	July 18, 2004	Summer Vacation Series Tour	Iwate, Japan	1	54	0	Defeated the teams of Kesen Numajiro and Kazuya Yuasa and Hayate and The Great Sasuke in a three-way tournament final.	
2	Kensuke Sasaki and Katsuhiko Nakajima	September 10, 2004	MPW television taping	Tokyo, Japan	1	177	1		
3	Jinsei Shinzaki (2) and Gaina	March 6, 2005	Wild Dance Tour	Tokushima, Japan	1	125	0		
4	The Great Sasuke and Dick Togo	July 9, 2005	Fighting Tohoku Legend Zero	Aomori, Japan	1	288	3		
5	Jinsei Shinzaki (3) and Gaina	April 23, 2006	Fighting Tohoku Legend 7th – Miyagi Volume	Sendai, Japan	2	<1	0		
—	Vacated	April 23, 2006	House show	Sendai, Japan	—	—	—	Vacated due to Gaina announcing his departure from MPW.	
6	Makoto Oishi and Shiori Asahi	May 20, 2006	Fighting Tohoku Legend 9th – Aomori Volume	Aomori, Japan	1	21	0	Defeated Shu and Kei Sato in a tournament final.	
7	Shu and Kei Sato	June 10, 2006	Fighting Tohoku Legend 10th – Iwate Volume	Iwate, Japan	1	37	0		
8	Tigers Mask and Flash Moon	July 17, 2006	Osaka Pro Wrestling's Osaka Pro Story #33	Osaka, Japan	1	83	0		
9	Shu and Kei Sato	October 8, 2006	Fighting Tohoku Legend – The Last Chapter	Morioka, Japan	2	195	1		
10	Kagetora and Rasse	April 21, 2007	Fukumen World League Tournament	Tokyo, Japan	1	268	3		
11	The Great Sasuke (2) and Yoshitsune	January 14, 2008	New Year Fight Tournament	Sendai, Japan	1	370	1		
12	Shu and Kei Sato	January 18, 2009	Start of New Year Fighting	Sendai, Japan	3	56	0	This match was also contested for the UWA World Tag Team Championship.	
13	Kesen Numajiro and Kinya Oyanagi	March 15, 2009	House show	Sendai, Japan	1	245	0		
14	Takeshi Minamino and Maguro Ooma	November 15, 2009	House show	Sendai, Japan	1	334	3		
15	Yapper Man #1 and Yapper Man #2	October 15, 2010	House show	Sendai, Japan	1	365	3	This was the final of the 2010 Michinoku Pro Tag Team Tournament.	
16	The Brahman Brothers (Brahman Shu and Brahman Kei)	October 15, 2011	House show	Takizawa, Japan	4	232	0	This was the final of the 2011 Michinoku Pro Tag Team Tournament. Formerly held the title under the names Shu Sato and Kei Sato.	
17	Rasse (2) and Kenbai	June 3, 2012	House show	Tokyo, Japan	1	193	1		
18	Último Dragón (2) and Kesen Numagirolamo (2)	December 13, 2012	MPW television taping	Tokyo, Japan	1	277	2		
19	Taro Nohashi and Behnam Ali	September 16, 2013	Autumn 3 Show Tour	Yahaba, Japan	1	232	2	Behnam Ali changed his ring name to Tiger Ali in 2014.	
20	Jinsei Shinzaki (4) and Kesen Numajiro (3)	May 6, 2014	Golden Tour 2014	Sendai, Japan	1	33	0		
21	Mu no Taiyo (The Great Sasuke (3) and Brahman Kei (5))	June 8, 2014	MPW television taping	Tokyo, Japan	1	279	2		
22	New Phase (Daichi Sasaki and Ayumu Gunji)	March 14, 2015	3 Battles in March Tour	Yahaba, Japan	1	192	0		
23	Ikuto Hidaka and Minoru Fujita	September 22, 2015	September Series - Gamushara Tour	Yahaba, Japan	1	725	5	Hidaka and Fujita also won the UWA World Tag Team Championship by defeating Brahman Kei and Brahman Shu on June 10, 2016.	
24	Super Stars (Rui Hiugaji and Ayumu Gunji (2))	September 16, 2017	Haisui No Jin Tour	Yahaba, Japan	1	183	1	This match was also contested for the UWA World Tag Team Championship.	
25	Taro Nohashi (2) and Gaina (3)	March 18, 2018	Konzen Ittai Tour	Sendai, Japan	1	251	3	This match was also contested for the UWA World Tag Team Championship.	
26	Bad Boy (Ken45° and Kengo)	November 24, 2018	Sendai 2 Days Tour	Sendai, Japan	1	163	2	This match was also contested for the UWA World Tag Team Championship.	
27	Taro Nohashi (3) and Gaina (4)	May 6, 2019	Golden Week Series 2019 Tour	Yahaba, Japan	2	39	0	This match was also contested for the UWA World Tag Team Championship.	
28	Ikuto Hidaka and Minoru Fujita	June 14, 2019	Michinoku 2019 Tokyo Conference Vol. 3 ~ Innin Jicho	Tokyo, Japan	2	127	1	This match was also contested for the UWA World Tag Team Championship.	
29	Yapper Man #1 and Yapper Man #2	October 19, 2019	Michinoku 2019 Tokyo Conference Vol. 6	Tokyo, Japan	2	563	2	This match was also contested for the UWA World Tag Team Championship.	
30	The Great Sasuke (4) and Jinsei Shinzaki (5)	May 4, 2021	Golden Week Tour 2021	Yahaba, Japan	1	306	0	This match was also contested for the UWA World Tag Team Championship.	
31	Taro Nohashi (4) and Gaina (5)	March 6, 2022	Michinoku Pro	Tokushima, Japan	3	133	1		
32	Bad Boy (Ken45° (2) and Manjimaru (2))	July 17, 2022	July Series 2022: Rihikyokuchoku	Sendai, Japan	1	125	1	Manjimaru was previously known as Maguro Ooma.	
33	Musashi (2) and Kazuki Hashimoto	November 19, 2022	November Series 2022: Kenkaikokō	Yahaba, Japan	1	223	1	Musashi was previously known as Daichi Sasaki.	
34	Kagetora (2) and Yoshitsune (2)	June 30, 2023	Michinoku Pro 30th Anniversary 2023 Tokyo Vol. 1	Tokyo, Japan	1	260	2		
35	Rasse (3) and Ringo Yamaya	March 16, 2024	Michinoku Pro 31th Anniversary Night 1	Yahaba, Japan	1	547	4		
—	Vacated	September 14, 2025	—	—	—	—	—		
36	Demonios (Arashi and Yasutaka Oosera)	November 2, 2025	Michinoku Pro Grande Uno 2025	Morioka, Japan	1	364	3	Defeated Musashi and Rasse to win the vacant titles. This Arashi is Arashi Ishikura, not Isao Takagi.	
37	Marukan Softman (2) and Mask de Coppe	November 1, 2026	Michinoku Pro Grande Dos 2026	Morioka, Japan	1	0+	0	Marukan Softman was previously known as Rui Hiugaji.	

== Combined reigns ==
As of November 1, 2026.

=== By team ===
†	Indicates the current champion

Rank	Team	No. of reigns	Combined defenses	Combined days
1	Yapper Man #1 and Yapper Man #2	2	5	928
2	Ikuto Hidaka and Minoru Fujita	2	6	852
3	Rasse and Ringo Yamaya	1	4	547
4	Shu and Kei Sato/The Brahman Brothers	4	1	520
5	Taro Nohashi and Gaina	3	4	423
6	The Great Sasuke and Yoshitsune	1	1	370
7	Demonios (Arashi and Yasutaka Oosera)	1	3	364
8	Takeshi Minamino and Maguro Ooma	1	3	334
9	The Great Sasuke and Jinsei Shinzaki	1	0	306
10	The Great Sasuke and Dick Togo	1	3	288
11	Mu no Taiyo (The Great Sasuke and Brahman Kei)	1	2	279
12	Último Dragón and Kesen Numagirolamo	1	2	277
13	Kagetora and Rasse	1	3	268
14	Kagetora and Yoshitsune	1	2	260
15	Kesen Numajiro and Kinya Oyanagi	1	0	245
16	Taro Nohashi and Behnam Ali	1	2	232
17	Musashi and Kazuki Hashimoto	1	1	223
18	Rasse and Kenbai	1	1	193
19	New Phase (Daichi Sasaki and Ayumu Gunji)	1	0	192
20	Super Stars (Rui Hiugaji and Ayumu Gunji)	1	1	183
21	Kensuke Sasaki and Katsuhiko Nakajima	1	1	177
22	Bad Boy (Ken45° and Kengo)	1	2	163
23	Jinsei Shinzaki and Gaina	2	0	125
23	Bad Boy (Ken45° and Manjimaru)	1	1	125
25	Tigers Mask and Flash Moon	1	0	83
26	Jinsei Shinzaki and Último Dragón	1	0	54
27	Jinsei Shinzaki and Kesen Numajiro	1	0	33
28	Makoto Oishi and Shiori Asahi	1	0	21
29	Marukan Softman and Mask de Coppe †	1	0	0+

=== By wrestler ===
Rank	Wrestler	No. of reigns	Combined defenses	Combined days
1	The Great Sasuke	4	6	1,243
2	Rasse	3	8	1,008
3	Yapper Man #1	2	5	928
3	Yapper Man #2	2	5	928
5	Ikuto Hidaka	2	6	852
5	Minoru Fujita	2	6	852
7	Kei Sato/Brahman Kei	5	3	799
8	Taro Nohashi	4	6	655
9	Yoshitsune	2	3	630
10	Ringo Yamaya	1	4	547
11	Kesen Numajiro/Kesen Numagirolamo	3	2	555
12	Gaina	5	4	548
13	Kagetora	2	5	528
14	Shu Sato/Brahman Shu	4	1	520
15	Jinsei Shinzaki	5	0	518
16	Manjimaru/Maguro Ooma	2	4	459
17	Daichi Sasaki/Musashi	2	1	415
18	Ayumu Gunji	2	1	375
19	Arashi	1	3	364
19	Yasutaka Oosera	1	3	364
21	Takeshi Minamino	1	3	334
22	Último Dragón	2	2	331
23	Ken45°	2	3	288
23	Dick Togo	1	3	288
25	Kinya Oyanagi	1	0	245
26	Behnam Ali	1	2	232
27	Kazuki Hashimoto	1	1	223
28	Kenbai	1	1	193
29	Rui Hiugaji/Marukan Softman †	2	1	183+
30	Kensuke Sasaki	1	1	177
30	Katsuhiko Nakajima	1	1	177
32	Kengo	1	2	163
33	Tigers Mask	1	0	83
33	Flash Moon	1	0	83
35	Makoto Oishi	1	0	21
35	Shiori Asahi	1	0	21
37	Shigehiro Irie †	1	0	0+

== See also ==
- Michinoku Pro Wrestling
- Tohoku Junior Heavyweight Championship
