= Masaki Okimoto =

Japanese professional wrestler

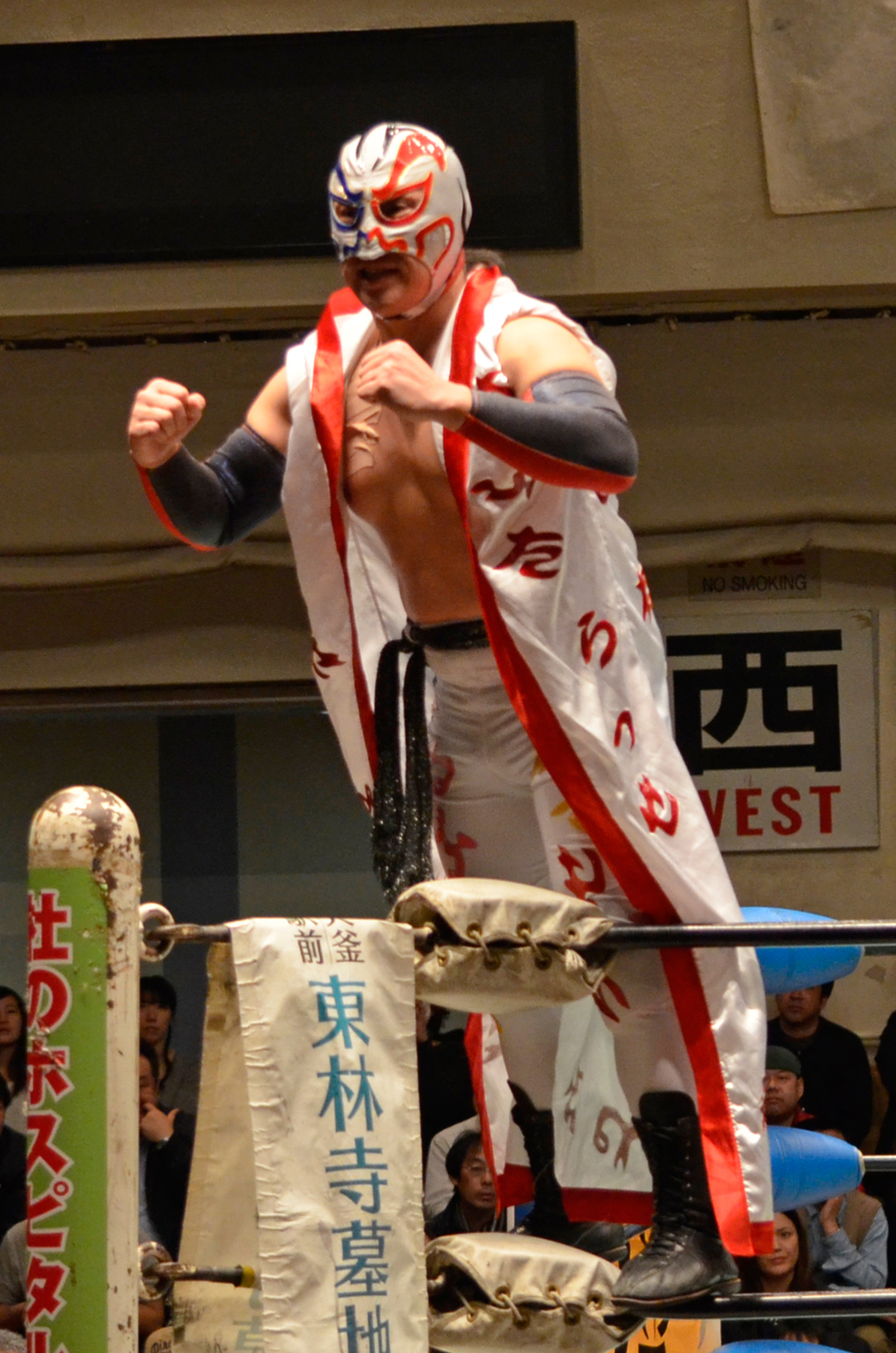

Personal information
- Born: May 21, 1982 (age 44) Neyagawa, Japan

Professional wrestling career
- Ring name(s): Jumping Kid Okimoto; Rasse; HUSTLE Kamen Blue; Michinoku Ranger Silver; Small Dandy Fuji; Hayabusacito
- Billed height: 1.65 m (5 ft 5 in)
- Billed weight: 75 kg (165 lb)
- Billed from: HUSTLE Nebula (as HUSTLE Kamen Blue)
- Trained by: Último Dragón; Jorge "Skayde" Rivera
- Debut: July 21, 2002

Masaki Okimoto (沖本 摩幸, Okimoto Masaki) (born May 21, 1982) is a Japanese professional wrestler from Neyagawa, Japan; he's a current member of the Michinoku Pro Wrestling roster as Rasse (ラッセ). He mainly uses a high-flying style.

== Career ==
=== Toryumon (2002-2004) ===
A former highschool amateur wrestler, Okimoto trained in the Último Dragón Gym and graduated in the 9th Toryumon school class term, debuting in Toryumon Mexico in 2002. He performed under the name of Small Dandy Fujii, a mini version of Toryumon Japan wrestler Sumo Dandy Fujii, and was a part of the Mini Crazy MAX stable along with SUWAcito and Mini CIMA. After a short individual participation in the Young Dragons Cup 2002, where he was eliminated by Condotti Shuji at the first round, Small Dandy and SUWAcito competed at the Yamaha Cup tag tournament, taking out Henry III Sugawara and Naoki Tanizaki at the first round before falling to Sailor Boys (Kei Sato and Shu Sato) at the second. Mini Crazy MAX developed a feud with Sailor Boys, led by Taiji Ishimori, and they kept it when the class term was moved to the Toryumon X promotion in Japan. Fujii was a comedic figure, and in October 2004, he got his head partially shaven by stipulation after being pinned by Manabu Murakami. That would be the last Toryumon X show, and its wrestlers were transferred to Michinoku Pro Wrestling.

He also wrestled in as HUSTLE Kamen Blue, a member of HUSTLE Kamen along HUSTLE Kamen Red and HUSTLE Kamen Yellow.

=== Michinoku Pro Wrestling (2004-present) ===
Okimoto's first apparition in M-Pro was at the Futaritabi Tag Team League, wrestling under the mask of Michinoku Ranger Silver with Michinoku Ranger Gold as his partner, doing a super sentai gimmick not unlike they did in HUSTLE. The duo got important victories over Los Salseros Japoneses (Pineapple Hanai and Mango Fukuda) and Jinsei Shinzaki and Shinjitsu Nohashi, but they did not win the league, which was taken by The Great Sasuke and GARUDA. In December, the team was dissolved and Okimoto adopted the gimmick of Rasse, a masked character representing the Aomori Nebuta Matsuri. He first teamed up with the former Ranger Gold, now known as Shanao, and the two gained a title shot for the Tohoku Tag Titles against Great Sasuke and Dick Togo, but were beaten.

Starting 2005, Rasse formed an alliance with GARUDA, first at the Michinoku Trios League (completing the trio with Maguro Ooma) and then in the Futaritabi Tag Team Tournament, but they were unsuccessful, getting eliminated at the latter by the eventual winning team of Shanao and Kagetora. Rasse spent the year as a low-ranked member of the Michinoku Seikigun against the heel stable Los Salseros Japoneses, though he had some victories, upsetting Kagetora and Gamma during the Iron Man Tournament. However, he ascended the scale in 2006, reaching the finals of a tournament for the Tohoku Junior Heavyweight title before LSJ leader Takeshi Minamino and actually winning the next Iron Man after pinning Hayato Fujita with the Mabataki. Doing this, he won a title short against the next junior heavyweight champion, Osaka Pro Wrestling's Super Delfín, but was defeated. Rasse then returned to the midcard, teaming up with Yoshitsune until end of 2006.

The next year, Rasse teamed up with the recently turned face Kagetora to win the Tohoku Tag Team Championship against Kei and Shu Sato, eventually unifying it with the Osaka Pro Wrestling Tag Team Championship from Hideyoshi and Masamune at the Pro Wrestling Summit 2007 independent event. They retained it successfully for the rest of 2007, even winning the next tag league while having the titles, but they finally lost the two titles against Osaka Pro representatives Gaina and Zero and MPW homologues Great Sasuke and Yoshitsune. The same year, Rasse competed individually at the prestigious Fukumen World League, but was eliminated at the first round by another Osaka Pro wrestler, Tigers Mask. Now titleless, Rasse struggled through 2008, but despite a good performance at the Iron Man and another tag team with Kagetora, he was frustrated. After a failed title shot against Hayato Fujita, now leader of the Kowloon heel stable, Rasse shockingly turned heel and joined them, later pledging his alliance to who revealed as the true leader of the group, their master Último Dragón.

=== El Dorado Wrestling (2006–2008) ===
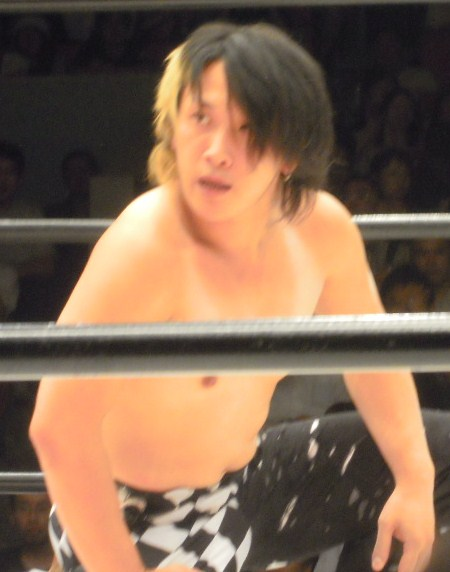
Okimoto in El Dorado Wrestling

In 2008, Okimoto joined the newborn El Dorado, wrestling as Jumping Kid Okimoto, a masked character dressed in black and white who came to the ring in jumping stilts. He initially was an integrant of the Taiji Ishimori's face army inherited from Dragondoor, but after Ishimori broke from El Dorado and left, Okimoto went solo and feuded with brother YASSHI. Okimoto got the revenge for a loss to him by showing an embarrassing photo of Yasshi in his high school days, as Okimoto and he had been both in the same school, but the brother got it back defeating him again. They then reconciled and resolved to form an amateur wrestling-themed stable, which also featured Yuji Hino and was called Nanking Fucking Wrestling Club. During that time, Okimoto competed both under his real name in said stable, using a realistic, mat wrestling based style, and also as Jumping Kid Okimoto, featuring his common high-flying. After Nanking Fucking Wrestling Club folded up, Okimoto competed solo and unaligned again, and for a second time in Masaki's career he lost a hair vs hair match, this time against Ken45º. In 2008, Jumping Kid Okimoto and KAGETORA fought Speed of Sounds (Tsutomu Oosugi and Hercules Senga) for the vacated UWA Tag Team Championship, but were defeated. Shortly after, El Dorado ended its run.

== Championships and accomplishments ==
- Michinoku Pro Wrestling
  - Tohoku Tag Team Championship (3 times) - with Kagetora (1), Kenbai (1) and Ringo Yamaya (1)
  - Iron Man Tournament (2006)
  - Fukumen World League Qualifying Tournament (2007)
  - Kowloon Strongest Tournament (2011)
  - Bar Mimosa Ki-Kohei Cup (2014)
  - Futaritabi Tag Team League (2007) - with Kagetora
- Osaka Pro Wrestling
  - Osaka Pro Wrestling Tag Team Championship (1 time) - with Kagetora
