= Takayasu Fukuda =

Japanese professional wrestler (born 1982)

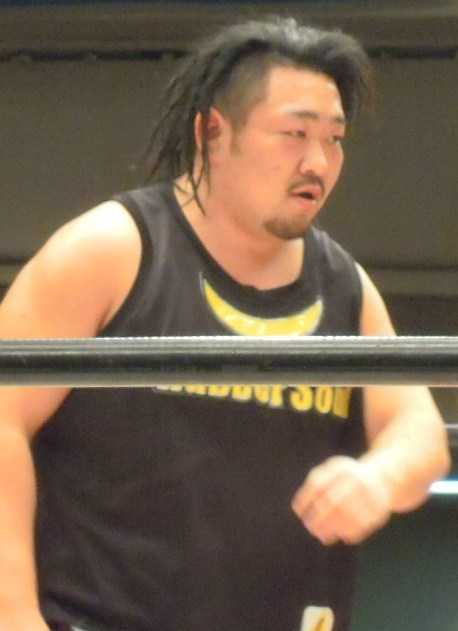
- Fukuda in December 2010

Personal information
- Born: June 27, 1982 (age 44) Koto, Tokyo, Japan

Professional wrestling career
- Ring name(s): Bear Fukuda; Gotsu-Totsu-Kotsu Daio; HUSTLE Kamen Yellow; Mango Fukuda; Mastodon; Mokaku Daio; Monster Kamen Yellow; Takayasu Fukuda
- Billed height: 1.77 m (5 ft 10 in)
- Billed weight: 110 kg (243 lb)
- Billed from: HUSTLE Nebula (as HUSTLE Kamen Yellow)
- Trained by: Último Dragón; Jorge "Skayde" Rivera
- Debut: February 22, 2003

Takayasu Fukuda (福田 貴泰, Fukuda Takayasu) (born June 27, 1982) is a Japanese professional wrestler. He currently wrestles as a freelancer in the Japanese independent circuit and as a regular in Secret Base.

== Professional wrestling career ==
=== Toryumon (2003–2004) ===
A Último Dragón Gym graduate, Fukuda started his career in Mexico under his real name, being the only heavyweight in his school class term. Shortly after his debut, Fukuda turned heel and joined forces with Takeshi Minamino and Pineapple Hanai to form the Los Salseros Japoneses stable, changing his name to Mango Fukuda and his attire to a salsa music outfit. The trio moved to Toryumon X and gained a major success by feuding with Sailor Boys (Taiji Ishimori, Kei Sato and Shu Sato). After the Toryumon X closing, his unit was transferred to Michinoku Pro Wrestling.

=== Michinoku Pro Wrestling (2004–2006) ===
Upon reaching M-Pro, Mango and Pineapple won the Futaritabi Tag Team League 2004 after beating Kazuya Yuasa & Kesen Numajiro. The trio became the main heel stable in the promotion, and they captured the UWA World Trios Championship defeating Solar, Ultraman and Ultraman, Jr. in a Toryumon Mexico show. Their reign lasted until May 2006, when they lost the titles to STONED (Maguro Ooma, Kei Sato and Shu Sato) after a misaimed attack from Minamino. Thereafter, the stable was dissolved when Hanai turned on Minamino, and Fukuda left the promotion in order to join El Dorado Wrestling.

=== Hustle (2005–2006) ===
Fukuda worked in HUSTLE from 2005 to 2006 as HUSTLE Kamen Yellow, with a comedic face role. He was a part of HUSTLE Kamen Rangers along HUSTLE Kamen Red and HUSTLE Kamen Blue, and helped the team in their feud against the Monster Army. Yellow stood among his partners for his large size, and was known for his surprising agility. In 2006, he was brainwashed by the Monster Army and turned on his former fellows, becoming Monster Kamen Yellow, but he was brought back to the HUSTLE Army in HUSTLEMANIA 2006. Kamen Rangers disappeared from HUSTLE after the show.

=== El Dorado Wrestling (2006–2008) ===
In 2006, while working in Michinoku Pro, Mango asked to appear on the first El Dorado Wrestling show. After becoming full-time in El Dorado upon his second appearance for the promotion, he changed his ring name to Bear Fukuda and adopted a street fighter gimmick. He became the man of choice when a big name outside wrestler came to El Dorado, wrestling Shinjiro Otani and Akira Taue, among others. In 2007, Fukuda joined Toru Owashi and his stable Animal Planets. He also appeared in Dramatic Dream Team as an El Dorado representative.

When El Dorado folded, Fukuda and others founded Secret Base.

=== All Japan Pro Wrestling (2007, 2014) ===
Through 2007, Fukuda wrestled in All Japan Pro Wrestling under a yellow full body suit as Mastodon, Ahii's enemy.

On April 23, 2014, during All Japan Pro Wrestling Champion Carnival tour Fukuda made his return to AJPW. He joined the Dark Kingdom group along with Kenichiro Arai, Mitsuya Nagai, Takeshi Minamino and Kengo Mashimo. The group's leader Kenso announced that this was the "true beginning" of DK.

== Championships and accomplishments ==
- Dramatic Dream Team

- Ironman Heavymetalweight Championship (2 times)
- Jiyūgaoka 6-Person Tag Team Championship (1 time) – with Durian Sawada Julie and Peach Owashi

- Guts World Pro Wrestling

- GWC Tag Team Championship (1 time) – with Mototsugu Shimizu

- Michinoku Pro Wrestling

- Futaritabi Tag Team League (2004) – with Pineapple Hanai

- Pro Wrestling Secret Base

- Captain of the Secret Base Openweight Championship (1 time, inaugural)
- Captain of the Secret Base Openweight Tag Team Championship (1 time, inaugural) – with Masato Shibata

- STYLE-E Pro Wrestling
  - STYLE-E Tag Team Championship (1 time, last) – with Masato Shibata
- Toryumon

- UWA World Trios Championship (1 time) – with Takeshi Minamino and Pineapple Hanai
