= Manabu Murakami (wrestler) =

Japanese professional wrestler

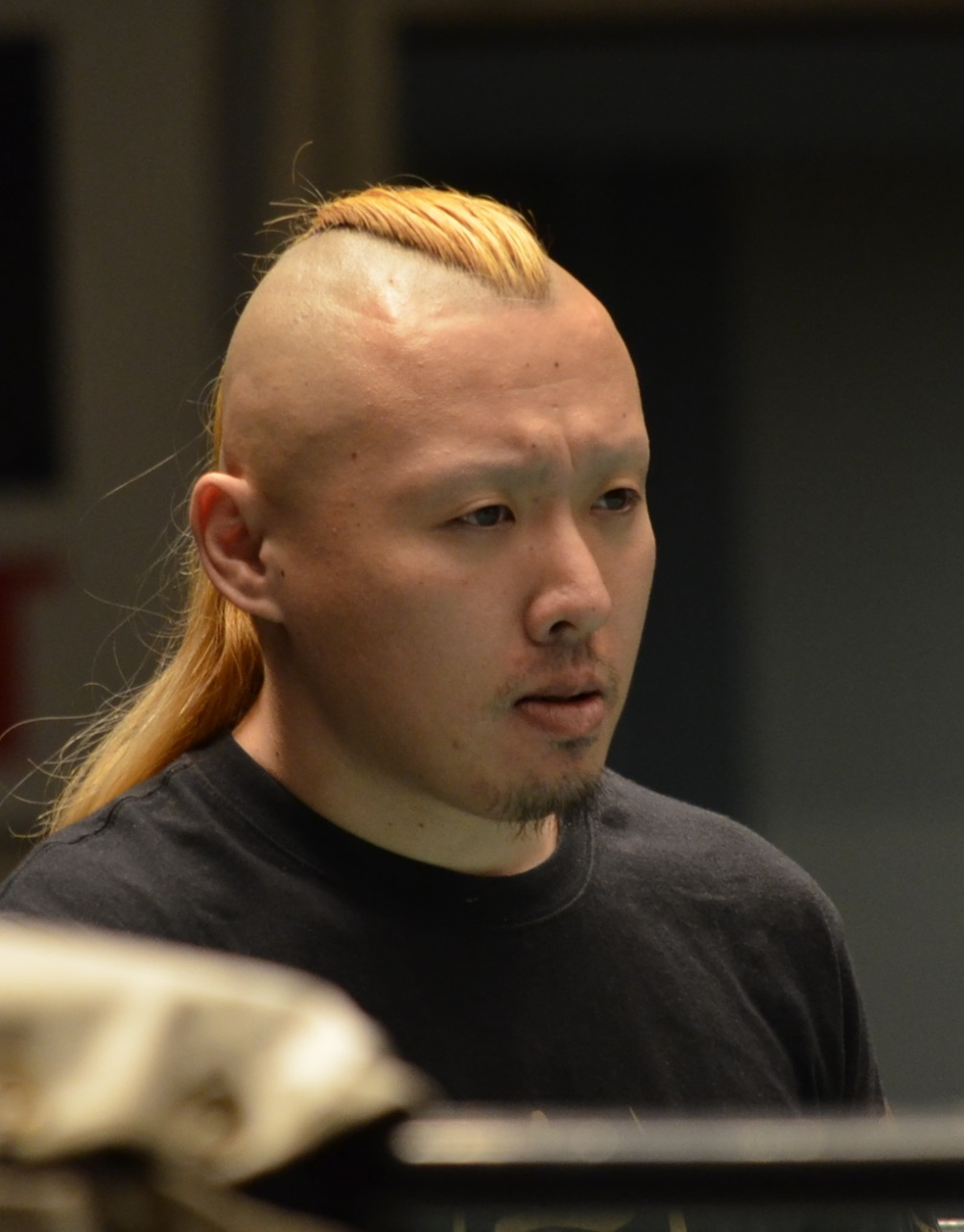
- Manjimaru in June 2014

Personal information
- Born: August 21, 1984 (age 41) Oma, Aomori, Japan

Professional wrestling career
- Ring name(s): Maguro Ooma; Manabu Murakami; Manjimaru
- Billed height: 1.74 m (5 ft 9 in)
- Billed weight: 78 kg (172 lb)
- Trained by: Último Dragón; Jorge "Skayde" Rivera
- Debut: December 7, 2002

Manabu Murakami (村上学, Murakami Manabu; born August 21, 1984) is a Japanese professional wrestler. He currently wrestles in Michinoku Pro Wrestling as Manjimaru (卍丸, Manjimaru).

== Professional wrestling career ==
=== Toryumon (2002–2004) ===
After training in the Último Dragón Gym, Murakami started his career in Mexico under his real name. He introduced the gimmick of a parodic mixed martial artist, wearing a red fundoshi along with MMA gloves and performing sexual antics to disturb his opponents in the ring. Murakami and his class were moved to Toryumon X, where his bizarre gimmick brought him an unexpected amount of popularity. After the Toryumon X closing, his unit was transferred to Michinoku Pro Wrestling.

=== Michinoku Pro Wrestling (2004–present) ===
Upon debuting in Michinoku Pro, Murakami adopted the name of Maguro Ooma and the gimmick of a traditional Japanese tuna fisherman. He retained his custom of wearing a fundoshi, though also making his entrance with fishing tools. Maguro had feuds with Tsubo Genjin and Junji Tanaka before turning heel in 2005 and joining the STONED faction founded by Kagetora and Gamma. Maguro changed his gimmick to a Japanese pirate inspired one, switching his loincloth for more traditional long pants, shirt and jika-tabi. He also started to employ a wild and violent wrestling style, using a spiked baseball bat and any other weapon he could get his hands on. On the May 3 show of M-Pro, Maguro, Kei Sato and Shu Sato defeated Los Salseros Japoneses (Takeshi Minamino, Pineapple Hanai & Mango Fukuda) to win the UWA World Trios Championship, which was vacated the same night.

After the fall of Hell Demons, Maguro became a founding member of the Kowloon stable, directed by Fujita Hayato, and formed a tag team with Takeshi Minamino, which was called Tonery Family. Minamino and Ooma won the Futaritabi Tag Team League 2009 and beat Kesen Numajiro & Kinya Oyanagi to win the Tohoku Tag Team Championship. They retained the title during months, until they dropped it to Yapper Men (Yapper Man #1 and Yapper Man #2). After the dissension of Kowloon, Tonery Family and Ken45º turned tweener and followed Hayato to his new stable, Bad Boy. However, in 2017 Tonery Family broke when Maguro was betrayed by Minamino, who left Bad Boy to form the Super Stars heel stable with Rui Hiugaji.

=== El Dorado Wrestling (2006–2008) ===
When El Dorado Wrestling was opened, Maguro and his M-Pro colleagues competed for it, with Maguro being known there as Manjimaru. He had a brutal feud with Mototsugu Shimizu in which they destroyed much El Dorado equipment and were ordered to pay off their damages by general manager Noriaki Kawabata. Manjimaru and Mototusugu competed as a tag team in the Treasure Hunters Tag Tournament 2006 in order to use the prize money to pay the fine, but they were eliminated by the eventual winners, Dick Togo & Shuji Kondo. Next week, the pair pleaded to Kondo to give them the money, but they were interrupted by YASSHI, who had come with a similar petition to clear his own debts. After an accidented main event, Kawabata partitioned the prize and gave both sides some of the money, and Manjimaru proposed using their part to produce the next El Dorado show and collect enough money to finally pay off the fine. During the show, both competed in a battle royal for the full control of the prize money, which was won by Shimizu with help from Onryo. Manjimaru and Shimizu paid the fine, and Motosugu gave the rest to his partner, who needed it for shoulder surgery. Now reconciled, the team promised more damages in the future, and Manjimaru left El Dorado to undergo surgery. Murakami briefly returned to El Dorado as a Hell Demons member, but the promotion fell in 2008.

== Championships and accomplishments ==
- Apache Pro-Wrestling Army
  - WEW Tag Team Championship (1 time) – with Takeshi Minamino
- Michinoku Pro Wrestling
  - Tohoku Junior Heavyweight Championship (1 time)
  - Tohoku Tag Team Championship (1 time) – with Takeshi Minamino
  - UWA World Trios Championship (1 time) – with Kei Sato & Shu Sato
  - Futaritabi Tag Team League (2009) – with Takeshi Minamino
- Pro Wrestling Illustrated
  - PWI ranked him #360 of the top 500 singles wrestlers in the PWI 500 in 2016
