= Kesen Numajiro =

Japanese wrestler and singer

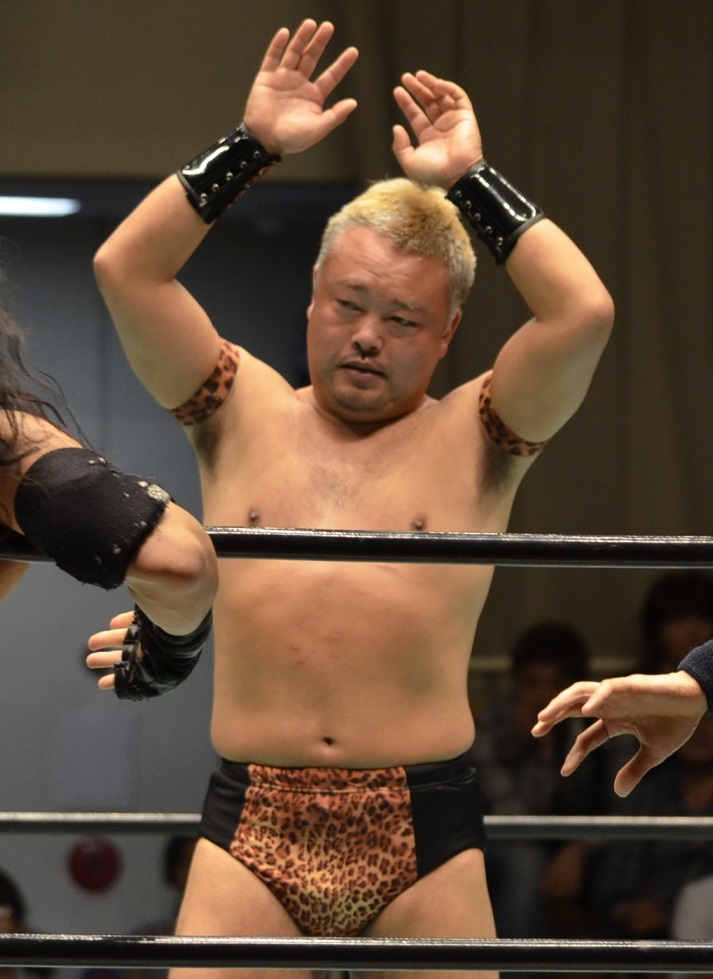
- Numajiro in May 2014

Personal information
- Born: 22 April 1972 (age 54) Kesennuma, Miyagi Prefecture, Japan

Professional wrestling career
- Ring name(s): Kesen Numajiro; Kesen Numagirolamo; Yone Genjin; Akihiro Yonekawa
- Billed height: 1.73 m (5 ft 8 in)
- Billed weight: 90 kg (200 lb)
- Trained by: Gran Hamada
- Debut: 1992

Akihiro Yonekawa (米河 彰大, Yonekawa Akihiro) is a Japanese professional wrestler and singer, better known for his ring name Kesen Numajiro (気仙 沼二郎, Kesen Numajirō). He has had a long career in Michinoku Pro Wrestling, where he currently wrestles, being a three-time Tohoku Tag Team champion and a one-time Tohoku Junior Heavyweight champion.

== Career ==
=== Michinoku Pro Wrestling (1993–present) ===
With a kendo and amateur wrestling background, Yonekawa trained in and debuted in Gran Hamada's Universal Lucha Libre in 1992. He later joined Michinoku Pro Wrestling, where after years in the low card, he became Yone Genjin, a humorous caveman gimmick. He had a comical feud with Wellington Wilkins Jr. before being sent to Consejo Mundial de Lucha Libre to train, which was in storyline explained as Genjin himself swimming his way to Mexico through the Pacific Ocean. Upon his return, now as a more civilized, Spanish-talking version of himself, but his luck did not change, being relegated again to low card comedy matches. In December 1998, Yone Genjin announced his retirement after a head injury. He would be replaced by Tsubo Genjin, a similar character played by Hiroyuki Kotsubo.

In December 2001, Yone Genjin made a surprise return to M-Pro as a sporadic wrestler, forming a tag team with Tsubo Genjin. Their alliance ended in November 2002, which was followed by Tsubo defeating Yone in a singles match in order to keep the gimmick. After a one year hiatus, Yonekawa returned in 2003 under the new gimmick of Kesen Numajiro, (a play with the name of his origin city, Kesennuma), an eccentric enka singer. Numajiro became famous for coming to the ring while singing, and he even launched several successful singles thanks to Yonekawa's natural voice skills, the first of which was Umi no Tamashii (Sea Soul).

In 2005, Numajiro turned heel, allying with the villainous salsa stable Los Salseros Japoneses (Takeshi Minamino, Pineapple Hanai and Mango Fukuda) in an attempt to turn it into a band called "Kesen Numajiro and los Salseros Japoneses." He feuded with another music-themed faction, boy band Sailor Boys (Kei and Shu Sato), over which had the best music, and they resolved to prove it in a match in which the loser would have to drop their gimmick. With the aid of Minamino, Numajiro defeated one of the Satos and stripped them of their music. Numajiro and Minamino took part in the Futaritabi Tag Team Tournament 2004, where they advanced to the finals, but they were eliminated by Shanao & Kagetora. His alliance with Los Salseros Japoneses lasted until June 2006, when the stable was dissolved. Numajiro turned face again, although he kept briefly teaming up with former salsero Banana Senga, who had similarly become a face.

Numajiro went unnoticed until 2008, when he formed a successful tag team with Kinya Oyanagi. On May 3, 2012, however, he faced Ultimo Dragon in a match where he loser would be forced to change his ring name, being predictably defeated. Numajiro then adopted the name of Kesen Numagirolamo (気仙・沼ジローラモ, Kesen Numajirōramo), a parody of Girolamo Panzetta, and formed a tag team with Dragon himself. He recovered his name back in April 2014.

== Championships and accomplishments ==
- Michinoku Pro Wrestling

- Tohoku Junior Heavyweight Championship (1 time)
- Tohoku Tag Team Championship (3 times) – with Kinya Oyanagi (1), Último Dragón (1) and Jinsei Shinzaki (1)
- Ichinoseki PR Center Cup (2008)
- Michinoku Trios League (2005) – with Great Sasuke and Jinsei Shinzaki
