= Takeshi Minamino =

Japanese professional wrestler

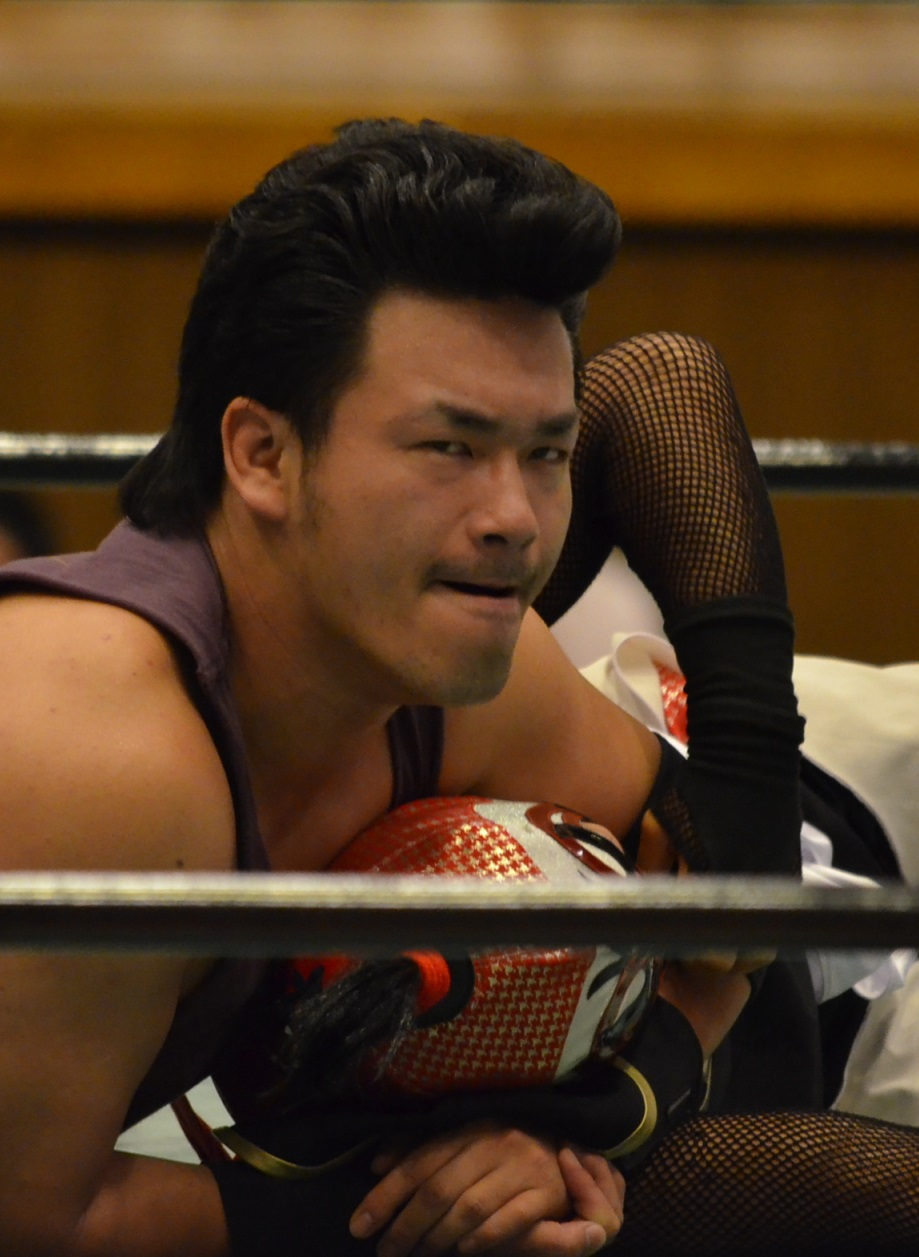
- Minamino in July 2014

Personal information
- Born: December 24, 1985 (age 40) Kyoto, Japan

Professional wrestling career
- Ring name(s): Beetle Takeshi; Esthetic Jaguar; HAPPY MAN; Kendo Takeshi; Masked Tree-Planting Man; Takeshi Minamino; Takeshi Yamamoto
- Billed height: 1.74 m (5 ft 9 in)
- Billed weight: 86 kg (190 lb)
- Trained by: Último Dragón; Jorge "Skayde" Rivera
- Debut: November 7, 2002

Takeshi Yamamoto (山本タケシ, Yamamoto Takeshi), (born December 24, 1985) better known by the ring name Takeshi Minamino (南野タケシ, Minamino Takeshi), is a Japanese professional wrestler. He wrestles in Michinoku Pro Wrestling and All Japan Pro Wrestling.

== Professional wrestling career ==
=== Toryumon (2002–2004) ===
Yamamoto made his pro wrestling debut in Toryumon Mexico at only sixteen, being the youngest debutant out of the Último Dragón Gym. He changed his ring name to Takeshi Minamino (南野タケシ, Minamino Takeshi) and joined Pineapple Hanai and Mango Fukuda to found Los Salseros Japoneses, a salsa music band themed heel stable led by him. Minamino established himself as a major heel and went to feud with top face Taiji Ishimori and his Sailor Boys (Kei and Shu Sato). They had their first bout in Toryumon X, where Minamino unsuccessfully challenged Ishimori for UWA World Welterweight Championship. On August 29, 2004 Minamino got a rematch in Mexico and won the title, retaining it against Taiji on October, 10 with aid from Fukuda and Hanai. The title was vacated after the match. After the Toryumon X demise, Minamino and his colleagues were moved to Michinoku Pro Wrestling.

=== Michinoku Pro Wrestling (2004–present) ===
Upon his arrival to Michinoku Pro, Minamino dissociated himself from Los Salseros Japoneses and formed a tag team with Como Leoapard, using a mask and the name Esthetic Jaguar. However, the team fell after the Futaritabi Tag Team League 2004 and Minamino returned to Los Salseros, posing as the top heel team in Michinoku Pro.

The trio won the UWA World Trios Championship from Solar, Ultraman and Ultraman, Jr. in a Toryumon Mexico show, and Minamino captured the Tohoku Junior Heavyweight Championship in a tournament final against Rasse, becoming double champion. His individual reign lasted until May, when he lost his title against Super Delfín. In June, Los Salseros Japoneses lost the UWA World Trios title against STONED (Maguro Ooma, Kei Sato and Shu Sato) by a misaimed attack from Minamino to Hanai, after which Los Salseros Japoneses broke up when Hanai turned on him.

Minamino went solo and turned face, adopting a traditional Japanese attire with a black hakama. He also played Happy Man, an alien character dressed in Superman-like pink attire, and had a title shot against the Tohoku Junior Heavyweight Champion Yoshitsune, but he failed.

In 2008, Minamino turned heel again and became a member of the Kowloon stable, directed by Fujita Hayato. He formed a tag team with Maguro Ooma, which was called Tonery Family. Minamino and Ooma won the Futaritabi Tag Team League 2009 and beat Kesen Numajiro & Kinya Oyanagi to win the Tohoku Tag Team Championship. They retained the title during months, until they dropped it to Yapper Men (Yapper Man #1 & Yapper Man #2). After the dissension of Kowloon, Tonery Family and Ken45º turned tweener and followed Hayato to his new stable, Bad Boy.

== Championships and accomplishments ==
- All Japan Pro Wrestling

- All Asia Tag Team Championship (1 time) – with Mitsuya Nagai
- Gaora TV Championship (1 time)

- Apache Pro-Wrestling Army

- WEW Tag Team Championship (1 time) – with Maguro Ooma

- Michinoku Pro Wrestling

- Tohoku Junior Heavyweight Championship (1 time)
- Tohoku Tag Team Championship (1 time) – with Maguro Ooma
- Futaritabi Tag Team League (2009) – with Maguro Ooma

- Toryumon

- UWA World Trios Championship (1 time) – with Mango Fukuda and Pineapple Hanai
- UWA World Welterweight Championship (1 time)
- Young Dragons Cup Tournament (2003)
