= Taro Nohashi =

Japanese professional wrestler (born 1982)

- Nohashi in May 2014

Personal information
- Born: August 10, 1982 (age 43) Kobe, Hyogo, Japan

Professional wrestling career
- Ring name(s): Arakencito; BLACK On The Outside Blue On The Inside Hikaritaro Nohashi; Kamesshi; Koichiro Arai; Seijin Nohashi; Shin Minilla; Great Kabukicito; Shinjitsu Nohashi; Taro Nohashi; Torinji Yoda; Uchu Torinji
- Billed height: 1.68 m (5 ft 6 in)
- Billed weight: 82 kg (181 lb)
- Trained by: Último Dragón; Jorge "Skayde" Rivera
- Debut: May 11, 2002

Taro Nohashi (野橋 太郎, Nohashi Tarō; ring name: のはし たろう) (born August 10, 1982) is a Japanese professional wrestler. He currently wrestles in Michinoku Pro Wrestling, where he is a former one-time Tohoku Junior Heavyweight Champion. He is also a former two-time Tohoku Tag Team Champion and one-time UWA World Tag Team Champion.

== Professional wrestling career ==
Nohashi, the smallest Último Dragón Gym trainee ever, made his pro wrestling debut in Toryumon Mexico in 2002 under the name of Koichiro Arai, Kenichiro Arai's (kayfabe) little brother. Koichiro teamed with Kenichiro and later with Chuichiro, the third brother, and wrestled in Toryumon Mexico and Toryumon X until 2004, when he changed his name to Shinjitsu Nohashi, the mini version of Jinsei Shinzaki.

After closing Toryumon X, Nohashi and his class were moved to Michinoku Pro Wrestling, where he formed a tag team with Shinzaki. On February 13, 2010 he turned heel and adopted his real name, Taro Nohashi, joining Fujita Hayato and his Kowloon stable.

== Championships and accomplishments ==
- Kyushu Pro-Wrestling

- Glocal Tag Tournament (2021) – with Gaina

- Michinoku Pro Wrestling

- Tohoku Junior Heavyweight Championship (1 time)
- Tohoku Tag Team Championship (2 times) – with Behnam Ali/Tiger Ali (1), Gaina (1)
- UWA World Tag Team Championship (1 time) – with Gaina
- Oogamania Cup (2008)

- Pro Wrestling Illustrated

- PWI ranked him #326 of the top 500 singles wrestlers in the PWI 500 in 2006
