= Kenichi Sakai =

Japanese professional wrestler

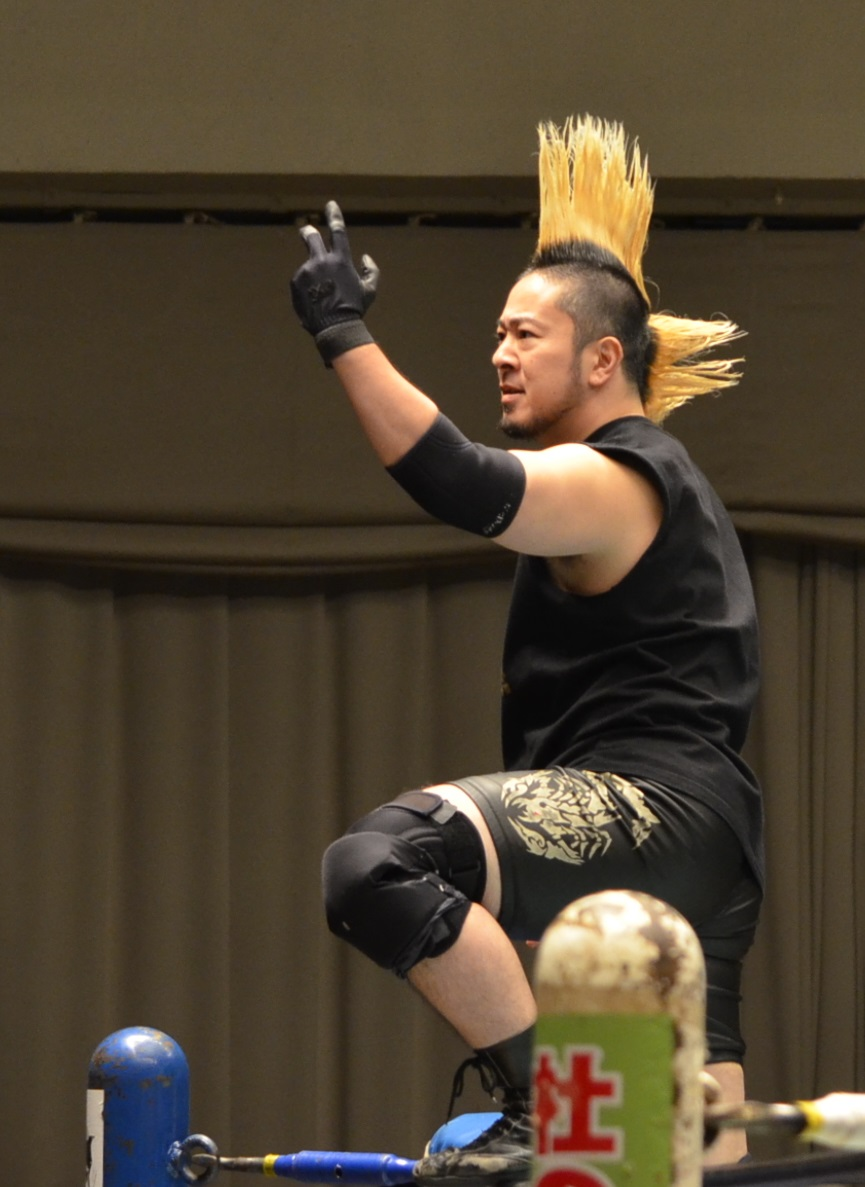
- Ken45° in December 2013

Personal information
- Born: May 25, 1982 (age 44) Sagamihara City, Kanagawa, Japan

Professional wrestling career
- Ring name(s): Ken45° Kenichi Hanai; Kenichi Sakai; Pineapple Hanai
- Billed height: 1.78 m (5 ft 10 in)
- Billed weight: 80 kg (180 lb)
- Trained by: Último Dragón; Jorge "Skayde" Rivera
- Debut: December 7, 2002

Kenichi Sakai (坂井 謙一, Sakai Kenichi), (born May 25, 1982) is a Japanese professional wrestler, currently signed to Michinoku Pro Wrestling where he competes under the ring name Ken45° and is one half of the reigning Tohoku Tag Team Champions and UWA World Tag Team Champions with Kengo.

== Biography ==
=== Toryumon (2002–2004) ===
In December 2002, Sakai debuted in Toryumon under his real name, although soon he adopted the ring name of Kenichi Hanai. After losing a match to Takeshi Minamino, the two allied themselves with Takayasu Fukuda and formed Los Salseros Japoneses, a salsa band stable. They became the main villains of the new brand Toryumon X, opposed to the similarly music-themed stable Sailor Boys (Taiji Ishimori, Kei Sato and Shu Sato). Hanai, now renamed Pineapple Hanai to fit his group's gimmick, became known for carrying a guitar to the ring to hit their opponents and help his team to win. Los Salseros Japoneses and Sailor Boys traded victories, but the former managed to capture the promotion's main title, the UWA World Welterweight Championship, in a three-way match among the members of the team themselves, which was won by Minamino. They also won the UWA World Trios Championship from Solar, Ultraman and Ultraman, Jr. in Mexico. After Toryumon X's demise, all of its wrestlers were sent to Michinoku Pro Wrestling.

=== Michinoku Pro Wrestling (2004–present) ===
Los Salseros Japoneses continued their run at Michinoku Pro Wrestling, with Hanai and Fukuda winning the Futaritabi Tag Team League 2004 upon their debut. However, the stable's history ended in April 2006 when they lost the UWA Trios title to STONED (Maguro Ooma, Kei Sato and Shu Sato) after Minamino accidentally hit Hanai. After the match, Hanai attacked Minamino and renounced his faction, which folded definitively when Hanai defeated Minamino in a match next week and hit him with his guitar.

Afterwards, Hanai changed his name to "Ken45º" and his gimmick to a rock star character along the lines of veteran wrestler Ricky Fuji. He also switched to an electric guitar and adopted punk mannerisms and outfits. He initially worked with Kagetora's heel faction STONED, but he distanced himself from them, as he was also teaming with up with Aagan Iisou, STONED's enemy faction, in El Dorado Wrestling.

Ken then tried to form his own stable, Ken Gundan, by defeating wrestlers and forcing them into servitude, but he only managed to secure the low-carders Mototsugu Shimizu, Rei and Banana Senga, and the group disbanded after some time. In March 2008, Ken45º helped to found Kowloon, a heel stable eventually led by Hayato Fujita. Ken left and turned face in October 2010 as a losing condition in a match against Great Sasuke.

=== El Dorado Wrestling (2006–2009) ===
Sakai also joined El Dorado Wrestling, where he started teaming up with Shuji Kondo's Aagan Iisou stable in an attempt to become a member. However, he had heat with Takuya Sugawara, who didn't want him in Aagan, and this brought losses and failures. At the end, Ken would lose a match to Sugawara which stipulated that he could not even occasionally team up with them, so he abandoned his aspirations and became freelance, not allied with any stable.

After growing tired of his free lifestyle, he joined up with the Sukiyaki stable when they were first being formed. He soon turned heel, buried his enmity with Sugawara and joined his stable Hell Demons.

== Other media ==
Outside of wrestling, Sakai is part of the rock band Crazy Crew with Ricky Fuji and Great Sasuke.

== Championships and accomplishments ==
- 4 Front Wrestling
  - 4FW Junior Heavyweight Championship (1 time)
- Michinoku Pro Wrestling
  - Tohoku Tag Team Championship (1 time) – with Kengo
  - UWA World Tag Team Championship (1 time) – with Kengo
  - Artemis Cup (2014)
  - Futaritabi Tag Team League (2004) – with Mango Fukuda
- Secret Base
  - Secret Base Six Man Tag Team Tournament (2011) – with Jun Ogawauchi and Kinya Oyanagi
- Toryumon
  - UWA World Trios Championship (1 time) – with Mango Fukuda and Takeshi Minamino
