= Kazuya Yuasa =

Japanese professional wrestler

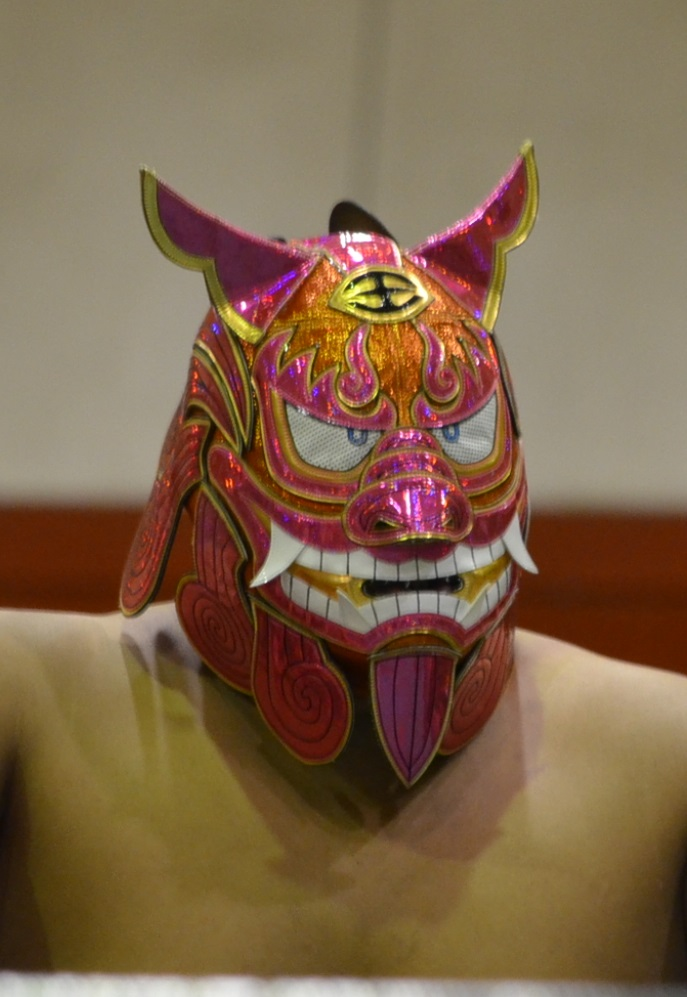
- Yuasa as Shisao in May 2014

Personal information
- Born: December 10, 1979 (age 46) Tokushima, Japan

Professional wrestling career
- Ring name(s): Darkside Gaina; Darth Vader Gaina; Gaina; Kamegoro; Kazuya Yuasa; Killer Croc Gaina; Shisao
- Billed height: 1.76 m (5 ft 9 in)
- Billed weight: 130 kg (290 lb)
- Trained by: Jinsei Shinzaki
- Debut: September 11, 1999

Kazuya Yuasa (湯浅 和也, Yuasa Kazuya) is a Japanese professional wrestler, better known for his ring names Gaina (stylized in all capital letters) and Shisao (シーサー王, Shīsāō). He has worked in Michinoku Pro Wrestling, Osaka Pro Wrestling and Okinawa Pro Wrestling, having titles in all the three promotions.

== Career ==
Scouted by Jinsei Shinzaki, Yuasa trained at the Michinoku Pro Wrestling dojo and debuted in the promotion in 1999. After being sent to Toryumon Mexico to learn, he had feuds against his master and Minoru Fujita. In 2004, he took part in the Super J-Cup, but he was eliminated at the first round by New Japan Pro-Wrestling representative Wataru Inoue. Despite the loss, Yuasa impressed the pundits so much that he was invited to the Young Lions Cup tournament in NJPW, reaching the finals and facing Ryusuke Taguchi in a losing effort. At the end of the year, back in Michinoku Pro, Yuasa adopted the name of Gaina and the gimmick of a rock star, dying his hair green and becoming more aggressive and cocky. He teamed with Shinzaki and won the Tohoku Tag Team titles after besting Kensuke Sasaki and Katsuhiko Nakajima, bringing the championship again to the promotion. Their reign was short, however, as they lost the titles against The Great Sasuke and Dick Togo, but they regained them some months after. At this point, Gaina announced he was leaving Michinoku Pro and they vacacted the title, with Yuasa finally leaving for Osaka Pro Wrestling, where he became the top heel and the leader of the stable Bad Force. His involvement with M-Pro had not ended, as he competed again for them during a interpromotional feud, beating Michinoku's Takeshi Minamino with the aid of the referee Ted Tanabe, and eventually capturing the Tohoku Junior Heavyweight Championship from Great Sasuke. They claimed the title for Osaka Pro and kept it until 2007, when Gaina lost it against Yoshitsune. Similarly, Osaka Pro would receive back their tag team title from Rasse and Kagetora, thanks to Gaina and Zero. In 2008, Gaina moved to Osaka Pro's developmental territory Okinawa Pro Wrestling, where he changed his gimmick to Shisao, based on the mythical Shisa.

== Championships and accomplishments ==
- Kyushu Pro-Wrestling
  - Glocal Tag Tournament (2021) – with Taro Nohashi
- Michinoku Pro Wrestling

- Tohoku Junior Heavyweight Championship (1 time)
- Tohoku Tag Team Championship (2 times) – with Jinsei Shinzaki

- Okinawa Pro Wrestling

- MWF Tag Team Championship (1 time) – with Kaijin Habu Otoko
- OPW Championship (1 time)

- Osaka Pro Wrestling

- Osaka Pro Wrestling Tag Team Championship (2 times) – with Zeus (1) and Zero (1)
- Tennōzan (2006)

- Tenryu Project
  - Tenryu Project World 6-Man Tag Team Championship (1 time) – with Kengo and Kouki Iwasaki
