= Kyosuke Sasaki (mixed martial artist) =

Japanese martial artist

- 佐々木恭介
- Born: October 17, 1979 (age 47); Uwajima, Ehime, Japan
- Height: 170 cm (5 ft 7 in)
- Martial arts career
- Nationality: Japanese
- Weight: 83 kg (183 lb)
- Division: Middleweight
- Stance: Southpaw
- Team: U-File Camp
- Rank: 2nd dan black belt in Judo
- Years active: 2001–2005 (MMA); 2003–present (Professional wrestling)

Mixed martial arts record
- Total: 14
- Wins: 3
- By submission: 2
- By decision: 1
- Losses: 7
- By knockout: 2
- By decision: 5
- Draws: 4

Amateur record
- Total: 1
- Wins: 1
- By submission: 1

Other information
- Mixed martial arts record from Sherdog
- Last updated on: September 11, 2025
- Professional wrestling career
- Ring names: Hitamaru Sasaki; Kyosuke Sasaki; Kyosuke Sarutobi; Waterman Hitamaru
- Billed height: 1.72 m (5 ft 8 in)
- Billed weight: 80 kg (180 lb)
- Billed from: Hita, Ōita
- Trained by: Kiyoshi Tamura; Ryota Chikuzen
- Debut: February 2, 2003

Kyosuke Sasaki (佐々木 恭介, Sasaki Kyōsuke; born October 17, 1979) is a Japanese professional wrestler and former mixed martial artist. Sasaki previously competed for Fighting Network Rings, Pancrase and Pride Fighting Championship.

As a professional wrestler, he made his in-ring debut in 2003 in the first event of Kiyoshi Tamura's U-Style promotion, in a bout against Yasuhito Namekawa. As of 2015, he is affiliated with Kyushu Pro-Wrestling where he wrestles under the ring name Hitamaru Sasaki (佐々木日田丸, Sasaki Hitamaru).

== Mixed martial arts career ==
Before his professional debut, while being trained at Kiyoshi Tamura's U-File Camp dojo, Sasaki was the runner-up in the 85 kg division of the 4th Japanese National Combat Wrestling Open Championship held on November 26, 2000 in Tokyo, losing to Kozo Urita. On March 20, 2001, at the 7th edition, he lost in the semifinals to the eventual winner Izuru Takeuchi.

Sasaki's professional debut was on May 13, 2001, in Tokyo against Takafumi Ito at Pancrase 2001 Proof Tour. It was a grappling bout billed as a "catch wrestling rules match", which he lost by unanimous decision. He made his mixed martial arts rules debut on December 21 in Yokohama at Rings: World Title Series 5. He lost to Hidetaka Monma.

Sasaki had his first win against Tatsuharu Doi on March 30, 2002, at Deep2001: 4th Impact in Nagoya. On September 8, he lost to Yushin Okami at the Demolition event held by Greatest Common Multiple (GCM).

On July 19, 2004, at Pride Bushido Part 4, he fought Eiji Mitsuoka to a draw in his first Pride Fighting Championship appearance.

On July 2, 2005, he fought Alex Reid at Cage Rage 12 in his first match outside Japan, and lost by technical knockout.

== Professional wrestling career ==
=== Early career and U-File (1999–2007) ===
In 1999, Sasaki joined the U-File Camp team, and in 2003, he made his professional wrestling debut at the inaugural event of U-Style, a promotion created by Tamura after the first MMA incarnation of Fighting Network Rings closed, and inspired by UWF International. At the event, he lost to Yasuhito Namekawa. Sasaki then wrestled a few matches in U-Style, Pro Wrestling Crusaders and Dramatic Dream Team (DDT). In the 2003 KO-D Tag League, Sasaki teamed with Ryu Echigo and, after two wins and two losses, the team finished second in their block, failing to advance to the finals.

In 2004, Sasaki joined Style-E, another U-File brand that was more pro-wrestling based. On June 13, Sasaki made his first Big Japan Pro Wrestling (BJW) appearance in the One Night Six-Man Tag Tournament, teaming with Daisuke Sekimoto and Futoshi Miwa. The team reached the final where they were defeated by Hero!, "Black Angel" Jaki Numazawa and Super-X. On August 18 at U-Style 10, in Korakuen Hall, Kyosuke Sasaki faced Kensuke Sasaki in a losing effort. On September 23, Sasaki entered the E-1 Climax 2004, a single-elimination tournament that would crown the inaugural Style-E Openweight Champion. He defeated Echico in the first round, then on October 10, he defeated Masato Saeki in the semi-finals and Kazuhiro Tamura in the final to win the Style-E Openweight Championship.

Sasaki continued to wrestle for Style-E between 2005 and 2007, making occasional appearances in U-Style, Fu-ten Promotion, IWA Japan, Real Japan Pro Wrestling, Battlarts, and Union Pro Wrestling (UPW). At Bati-Bati, the inaugural Fu-ten Promotion event held in Yokohama on April 24, 2005, Sasaki and Hajime Moriyama were defeated by Ikuto Hidaka and Minoru Fujita in the first tag team match of the promotion. Most notably, Sasaki faced Shamoji Fujii at U-Style Axis on November 23, at the Ariake Coliseum, albeit in a losing effort. On September 30, 2006, Sasaki lost the Style-E Openweight Championship to Isami in his fifth defense of the title at Style-E Wrestle Autumn.

=== Fu-ten Promotion (2007–2009) ===
After leaving U-File in February 2007, Sasaki officially joined Daisuke Ikeda's Fu-ten Promotion in August. On October 20, at Bati-Bati 9, he entered the Bati-Bati Tag Tournament with Shuji Ishikawa as team "Giri Giri Ga Gan Gan". Together, they defeated Kota Ibushi and Manabu Hara in the first round, then Katsumi Usuda and Koichiro Kimura in the semi-finals at Bati-Bati 10 on November 25, before losing to Takahiro Oba and Takeshi Ono in the final at Bati-Bati 11 on December 16. After this, Sasaki wrestled mostly singles bouts throughout 2008, until his last appearance for the promotion on March 1, 2009, at Bati-Bati 25, in a losing effort to Minoru Fujita.

=== Freelancing (2009–2015) ===
After leaving Fu-ten in March 2009, Sasaki continued to compete for Style-E, Battlarts, UPW and DDT as a freelancer. On August 30, at UPW Let's Go! Union!: In the Name of Union, Sasaki teamed with Kazuhiro Tamura and Shota to face Seiya Morohashi, 726 and Shigehiro Irie in a losing effort. On November 29, at DDT Special 2009, Sasaki teamed with Mitsuya Nagai to defeat the team of Thanomsak Toba and Atsuo "Malenko" Sawada in a Hard Hit Rules match.

On February 28, 2010, at UPW Yuki Konkon Arare ya Union, Sasaki teamed with Hamuko Hoshi to face Ken Ohka and Cherry in a losing effort. On October 3, at UPW Let's Go Union 2010: Union Parade, Sasaki defeated Hiroo Tsumaki.

On July 8, 2012, Sasaki made his Kyushu Pro-Wrestling debut at the promotion's fourth anniversary event, Kinniku Yamakasa '12. Wrestling as the masked Waterman Hitamaru (ウォーターマン日田丸, Wōtāman Hitamaru), he defeated Junji Tanaka. Over the next three years, Sasaki continued to portray this character in Kyushu Pro, while wrestling under his real name in other promotions. On December 2, Sasaki entered the Hakata Hanamidori Cup 1 Day Tag Team Tournament with Kotaro Nasu, but they were eliminated in the first round by Asosan and Yuki Sato.

On February 23, 2013, Sasaki entered the U-File Camp tournament which would determine the second U-Style Champion, after Kiyoshi Tamura vacated the title in January. Sasaki defeated Go in the first round, but was eliminated by Masashi Takeda in the second round, on April 27. On November 10 at U-File Special 11, Sasaki defeated Kazuki Okubo to win the U-Style Championship.

On July 7, 2014, at a joint event between BJW and Pro Wrestling FTO, Sasaki teamed with Shiori Asashi to face Shinya Ishikawa and Skull Reaper A-ji in a losing effort. On August 2, Sasaki successfully defended the U-Style Championship against Kotaro Nasu. On December 20, Sasaki lost the U-Style title to Manabu Hara.

On July 5, 2015, at Kyushu Pro's Kumamoto ba Genki ni Suru bai! '15, Sasaki – wrestling as Waterman Hitamaru – defeated The Glover but was unmasked during the match, revealing his identity. He then rejected his mask and adopted the name Hitamaru Sasaki. On October 2, it was announced that Sasaki had officially joined Kyushu Pro-Wrestling.

=== Kyushu Pro-Wrestling (2015–present) ===
On October 7, 2015, at Tenjin ba Genki ni Suru bai! '15, Sasaki unsuccessfully challenged Mentai☆Kid for the Kyushu Pro-Wrestling Championship in his first match as a full-time member of the promotion. On December 6, Sasaki and Kotaro Nasu entered the Hakata Hanamidori Cup. They defeated The Glover and Kisshern in the first round but were eliminated by Genkai and Asosan in the semi-finals.

In 2016, Sasaki made appearances in Inoki Genome Federation, Chō Sentō Puroresu FMW, and Oz Academy, then on December 4 at Kinniku Seimon Barai '16, he faced Yoshiaki Fujiwara in a losing effort. On July 30, 2017, at Kinniku Yamakasa '17, Sasaki teamed with Keiji Muto and Billyken Kid to defeat Genbu-kai (Asosan, Naoki Sakurajima and Minoru Fujita). On August 27 at Kagoshima o Genki ni Suddo! '17, Sasaki lost to Naoki Sakurajima. After the match, Sakurajima asked his Genbu-kai stablemates and mentors, Genkai and Asosan, to graduate from the stable, effectively leaving Genbu-kai. The following month, after defeating Asosan at Tenjin ba Genki ni Suru bai! '17, Sasaki was invited to join Genbu-kai as Sakurajima's replacement.

In the 2017 Hakata Hanamidori Cup – a special edition of the tournament in which the Kyushu Pro-Wrestling Tag Team Champions would defend the title in all their matches – Sasaki teamed with Asosan as Yamamizuki (Note: Japanese: 山水鬼). Together, they defeated Team Matsuri (Junji Tanaka and Batten×Burabura) in the first round, Menzakura (Mentai☆Kid and Naoki Sakurajima) in the semi-finals, and finally Umihebi (Genkai and Hub) in the final to win the tournament and the Kyushu Pro-Wrestling Tag Team Championship. They lost the title to Ryota Chikuzen and Yuji Hino on January 14, 2018, at Kitakyushu ba Genki ni Suru bai! '18.

On March 4, 2018, at Kasuga-shi ba Genki ni Suru bai! '18, Sasaki unsuccessfully challenged Kazuaki Mihara for the Kyushu Pro-Wrestling Championship. In the 2018 Hakata Hanamidori Cup, Yamamizuki were eliminated in the first round by Zero Gravity Heroes (Mentai☆Kid and Alejandro).

On April 7, 2019, at Kitakyushu ba Genki ni Suru bai! '19, Sasaki unsuccessfully challenged Yuji Hino for the Kyushu Pro-Wrestling Championship. In June, it was announced that Sasaki would be challenging Tsubabilly (Tsubasa and Billyken Kid) for the Kyushu Pro-Wrestling Tag Team Championship on July 14 at Kinniku Yamakasa '19, with a mystery partner set to become the newest member of Genbu-kai. At the event, the mystery partner was revealed to be Kenichiro Arai of Dragon Gate. However, Sasaki and Arai failed to capture the title.

In the 2020 Hakata Hanamidori Cup, Yamamizuki were eliminated in the semi-finals by the eventual winners Genkai and Kengo Mashimo. On May 3, 2021, at Monday Night Vai! #2, Sasaki faced Takaku Fuke in a UWF Rules match, but was defeated by submission. On September 6, Sasaki produced a special edition of Monday Night Vai! #6, titled Hitamar-U-Style "Starlanes", and centered around UWF-style matches. In the main event, he fought Daisuke Nakamura to a 20-minute time limit draw. On October 3, Sasaki unsuccessfully challenged Kengo Mashimo for the Kyushu Pro-Wrestling Championship at an Active Advance Pro Wrestling event in Fukuoka. The following day, Sasaki and Genkai entered the first edition of the Glocal Tag Tournament, defeating Quiet Storm and Dylan James in the first round. On November 1, they were eliminated in the semi-finals by Gaina and Taro Nohashi of Michinoku Pro Wrestling.

On January 3, 2022, at Jokyo, the first Kyushu Pro event to be held in Tokyo, Sasaki faced Minoru Tanaka in a UWF Rules match in a losing effort. On April 16, at Gleat's G Prowrestling Ver.22, Sasaki teamed with Takaku Fuke to face Minoru Tanaka and Takanori Ito in a Lidet UWF Rules tag team match which they lost. In the 2022 Glocal Tag Tournament, Sakai and Genkai defeated Tajiri and Gianni Valletta in the first round on October 4, before being eliminated by Tigers Mask and Hub in the second round on November 12.

On May 7, 2023, at Kasuga ba Genki ni Suru bai!, Sasaki teamed with Kota Umeda as Kusuo (Note: Japanese: 九蹴男), defeating Mil Gracias (Sugi and Raicho) to win the Kyushu Pro-Wrestling Tag Team Championship. On August 6 at the Kyushu Pro 15th Anniversary Show, Kusuo successfully defended the title against Minoru Suzuki and Takaku Fuke. One week later, Kusuo defeated the Italian tag team Brixia Bone Breakers (Nico Inverardi and Mirko Mori) for their second successful defense of the Kyushu Pro-Wrestling Tag Team Championship. On October 1 at Tosu ba Genki ni Suru ken!, Kusuo successfully defended the Kyushu Pro-Wrestling Tag Team Championship against Dōki no Sakura (Naoki Sakurajima and Kazuaki Mihara). On November 23 at a Kyushu Heavy Rain Disaster Support event, Sasaki unsuccessfully challenged Kodai Nozaki for the Kyushu Pro-Wrestling Championship.

On February 11, 2024, at Kitakyushu Genki Matsuri 2024, Kusuo successfully defended the Kyushu Pro-Wrestling Tag Team Championship against Minoru Fujita and Masashi Takeda. On April 14 at Kasaysayan, an event held in coproduction with Manila Wrestling Federation in Quezon City, Sasaki teamed with Naoki Sakurajima to unsuccessfully challenge Turn Zero Kill (Ken Cifer and Saint John Martin) for the WUW World Tag Team Championship. Two weeks later at Kumamoto ba Genki ni Suru bai!, Kusuo lost the Kyushu Pro-Wrestling Tag Team Championship to Doikuma (Koji Doi and Kumaarashi). On May 26 at Gleat Ver.11, Sasaki teamed with Minoru Tanaka to defeat Kota Umeda and Yu Iizuka in a UWF Rules match.

On May 4, 2025, in the pre-show of the second night of New Japan Pro-Wrestling's Wrestling Dontaku, Sasaki teamed with Jet Wei to face Ryusuke Taguchi and Katsuya Murashima in a losing effort. On August 24 at Kumamoto ba Genki ni Suru bai!, Sasaki defeated Shuji Ishikawa to win the Kyushu Pro-Wrestling Championship.

On January 10, 2026, at Gleat Ver.22, Sasaki teamed with Yuki Tanaka in a losing effort against Kotaro Suzuki and Tetsuya Izuchi in a UWF Rules match.

== Mixed martial arts record ==
Professional record breakdown
14 matches	3 wins	7 losses
By knockout	0	2
By submission	2	0
By decision	1	5
Draws	4	

Res.	Record	Opponent	Method	Event	Date	Round	Time	Location	Notes
Draw	3–7–4	Hikaru Sato	Draw (unanimous)	Pancrase 2005 Spiral Tour	December 4, 2005	1	10:00	Tokyo, Japan	
Loss	3–7–3	Mark Weir	KO (punches)	Cage Rage 13: No Fear	September 10, 2005	1	1:52	London, England	
Loss	3–6–3	Alex Reid	TKO (doctor stoppage)	Cage Rage 12: The Real Deal	July 2, 2005	1	5:00	London, England	
Loss	3–5–3	Jutaro Nakao	Decision (unanimous)	RealRhythm 1st Stage	March 6, 2005	3	5:00	Osaka, Japan	
Draw	3–4–3	Hikaru Sato	Draw (unanimous)	Pancrase 2004 Brave Tour	October 12, 2004	2	5:00	Tokyo, Japan	
Draw	3–4–2	Eiji Mitsuoka	Draw (time limit)	Pride Bushido Part 4	July 19, 2004	2	5:00	Nagoya, Japan	
Win	3–4–1	Yoshinori Oniki	Technical submission (armbar)	Deep: 13th Impact	January 22, 2004	2	3:04	Tokyo, Japan	
Draw	2–4–1	Kosei Kubota	Draw (time limit)	clubDeep 4th West Chōfu	November 24, 2003	2	5:00	Chōfu, Japan	
Loss	2–4	Seichi Ikemoto	Decision (unanimous)	Deep: 11th Impact in Osaka	July 13, 2003	3	5:00	Osaka, Japan	
Loss	2–3	Tetsuya Onose	Decision (unanimous)	The Battle Field "ZST" Opening Event	November 23, 2002	2	5:00	Tokyo, Japan	
Loss	2–2	Yushin Okami	Decision (unanimous)	Demolition	September 8, 2002	2	5:00	Yokohama, Japan	
Win	2–1	Motomichi Mori	Decision (unanimous)	Premium Challenge	May 6, 2002	1	10:00	Tokyo, Japan	
Win	1–1	Tatsuharu Doi	Submission (Kimura)	Deep2001: 4th Impact	March 30, 2002	1	2:51	Nagoya, Japan	
Loss	0–1	Hidetaka Monma	Decision (majority)	Rings: World Title Series 5	December 21, 2001	2	5:00	Yokohama, Japan	

Amateur record breakdown		
1 match	1 win	0 losses
By submission	1	0

Res.	Record	Opponent	Method	Event	Date	Round	Time	Location	Notes
Win	1–0	Akira Nitagai	Submission (armbar)	Pride The Best, Vol. 3	October 20, 2002	1	4:35	Tokyo, Japan	

== Submission grappling record ==
Result	Opponent	Method	Event	Date	Round	Time	Notes
Loss	(Japan) Takafumi Ito	Decision (unanimous)	Pancrase 2001 Proof Tour	May 13, 2001	1	5:00	Catch wrestling rules

== Championships and accomplishments ==
- Kyushu Pro-Wrestling
  - Kyushu Pro-Wrestling Championship (1 time)
  - Kyushu Pro-Wrestling Tag Team Championship (2 times) – with Asosan (1) and Kota Umeda (1)
  - Hakata Hanamidori Cup 1 Day Tag Team Tournament (2017) – with Asosan
- Riki Office
  - Magnitude 1 Day Tag Team Tournament (2007) – with Kazuhiro Tamura
- Style-E
  - Style-E Openweight Championship (1 time)
  - E-1 Climax (2004)
- Total Athletic Martial Arts
  - WMW Middleweight Championship (1 time)
  - WMW International Super Middleweight Championship (1 time)
- U-Style
  - U-Style Championship (1 time)
