= Glocal Tag Tournament =

Professional wrestling tag team tournament

- Promotions: Kyushu Pro-Wrestling
- First event: Glocal Tag Tournament 2021
- Event gimmick: Single-elimination tag team tournament

The Glocal Tag Tournament (Japanese: グローカル・タッグトーナメント, Hepburn: Gurōkaru Taggu Tōnamento) is a professional wrestling single-elimination tag team tournament created by Kyushu Pro-Wrestling. Launched in 2021, the tournament aims to showcase local independent promotions from all over Japan.

== List of winners ==
Year	Winners (total won as an individual)	Total won as a team	Participating teams	Ref.
2021	Gaina and Taro Nohashi	1	8	
2022	Hub and Tigers Mask	1	16	

== Results ==
=== 2021 ===
Glocal Tag Tournament 2021
- Promotional poster for the event
- Promotion: Kyushu Pro-Wrestling
- Date: October 4–December 6, 2021
- City: Fukuoka, Japan
- Venue: Nishitetsu Hall
- Tagline: A tag team festival of regional pride, kicking off. (Note: Japanese: 地域(ローカル)の誇りを賭けたタッグの祭典、開幕。, Hepburn: Rōkaru no hokori o kaketa taggu no saiten, kaimaku.)

Glocal Tag Tournament chronology
← Previous —	Next → 2022

The first edition of the tournament was held between October 4 and December 6, 2021, and featured eight teams.

Participants
Entrants	Representing	Promotion
Mentai☆Kid and Kodai Nozaki	Kyushu	Kyushu Pro-Wrestling
Ryo Saito and Yasushi Kanda	Kobe	Dragongate
Gurukun Mask and Shuri Joe	Okinawa	Ryukyu Dragon Pro-Wrestling
Billyken Kid and Ultimate Spider Jr.	Osaka	Osaka Pro Wrestling
Gaina and Taro Nohashi	Tohoku	Michinoku Pro Wrestling
Kengo Mashimo and Kaji Tomato (Note: Tatsuya Hanami was originally scheduled to be Mashimo's partner, but he had to withdraw due to suffering from a fever.)	Chiba	Action Advance Pro Wrestling
Genkai and Hitamaru Sasaki	Kyushu	Kyushu Pro-Wrestling
Quiet Storm and Dylan James	Overseas	—

First round Monday Night Vai! #7 (October 4)
Mentai☆Kid and Kodai Nozaki	Pin
Ryo Saito and Yasushi Kanda	12:49
Gurukun Mask and Shuri Joe	Pin
Billyken Kid and Ultimate Spider Jr.	15:15
Gaina and Taro Nohashi	Pin
Kengo Mashimo and Kaji Tomato	13:58
Genkai and Hitamaru Sasaki	Pin
Quiet Storm and Dylan James	15:34

Semifinals; Monday Night Vai! #8 (November 1)
Mentai☆Kid and Kodai Nozaki	Pin
Gurukun Mask and Shuri Joe	13:01
Gaina and Taro Nohashi	Pin
Genkai and Hitamaru Sasaki	24:23

Final; Monday Night Vai! #9 (December 6)
Mentai☆Kid and Kodai Nozaki	21:55
Gaina and Taro Nohashi	Pin

=== 2022 ===
Glocal Tag Tournament 2022
- Promotional poster featuring Gurukun Mask, Ryota Chikuzen, Jinsei Shinzaki, Zeus and Toshiki Toeda
- Promotions: Active Advance Pro Wrestling; Kyushu Pro-Wrestling; Michinoku Pro Wrestling; Osaka Pro Wrestling; Ryukyu Dragon Pro-Wrestling
- Date: October 4–December 3, 2022
- City: Various; Final: Fukuoka, Japan
- Venue: Various; Final: Acros Fukuoka
- Tagline: National tag team tournament of regional pride begins (Note: Japanese: 地域の誇りを懸けたタッグの全国大会 開幕, Hepburn: Chiiki no hokori o kaketa taggu no zenkokutaikai kaimaku.)

Glocal Tag Tournament chronology
← Previous; 2021	Next → —

The second edition of the tournament ran from October 4 to December 3, 2022, and featured 16 teams. This edition was hosted by an executive committee of five organizations: Ryukyu Dragon Pro-Wrestling, Kyushu Pro-Wrestling, Michinoku Pro Wrestling, Osaka Pro Wrestling and Active Advance Pro Wrestling (2AW).

Participants
Entrants	Representing	Promotion
Genki Horiguchi and Susumu Mochizuki	Kobe	Dragongate
Tamura and Raimu Imai	Kawasaki	Pro-Wrestling Heat-Up
Ultrasoki and Shuri Joe	Okinawa	Ryukyu Dragon Pro-Wrestling
Kota Sekifuda and Kazumasa Yoshida	Yokohama	Big Japan Pro Wrestling
Hub and Tigers Mask	Osaka	Osaka Pro Wrestling
The Great Sasuke and Ringo Yamaya	Tohoku	Michinoku Pro Wrestling
Tajiri and Gianni Valletta	Overseas	—
Genkai and Hitamaru Sasaki	Kyushu	Kyushu Pro-Wrestling
Mentai☆Kid and Kodai Nozaki	Kyushu	Kyushu Pro-Wrestling
Kengo Mashimo and Tatsuya Hanami	Chiba	Active Advance Pro Wrestling
Rising Hayato and Imabari Towel Mascaras	Ehime	Ehime Pro-Wrestling
Masato Tanaka and Ryo Hoshino	Tochigi	Tochigi Pro-Wrestling
Gaina and Taro Nohashi	Tohoku	Michinoku Pro Wrestling
Itabashi Fudoppy and Itabashi Insatsuman	Tokyo	Itabashi Pro-Wrestling
Kengo Takai and Michio Kageyama	Nagoya	Pro-Wrestling Team Dera
Shima Shigeno and Big The Ryokan	Niigata	Niigata Pro-Wrestling

First round (October 4)
Genki Horiguchi and Susumu Mochizuki	Pin
Tamura and Raimu Imai	6:41
Ultrasoki and Shuri Joe	Pin
Kota Sekifuda and Kazumasa Yoshida	6:10
Hub and Tigers Mask	Pin
The Great Sasuke and Ringo Yamaya	4:01
Tajiri and Gianni Valletta	8:08
Genkai and Hitamaru Sasaki	DQ
Mentai☆Kid and Kodai Nozaki	Pin
Kengo Mashimo and Tatsuya Hanami	19:02
Rising Hayato and Imabari Towel Mascaras	6:22
Masato Tanaka and Ryo Hoshino	Pin
Gaina and Taro Nohashi	Pin
Itabashi Fudoppy and Itabashi Insatsuman	10:45
Kengo Takai and Michio Kageyama	Pin
Shima Shigeno and Big The Ryokan	6:16

Second round (November 12)
Genki Horiguchi and Susumu Mochizuki	10:33
Ultrasoki and Shuri Joe	Pin
Hub and Tigers Mask	Pin
Genkai and Hitamaru Sasaki	19:59
Mentai☆Kid and Kodai Nozaki	Pin
Masato Tanaka and Ryo Hoshino	12:01
Gaina and Taro Nohashi	Pin
Kengo Takai and Michio Kageyama	13:30

Semifinals (December 3)
Ultrasoki and Shuri Joe	9:41
Hub and Tigers Mask	Pin
Mentai☆Kid and Kodai Nozaki	Pin
Gaina and Taro Nohashi	7:22

Final (December 3)
Hub and Tigers Mask	Pin
Mentai☆Kid and Kodai Nozaki	14:03
