= Musashi (wrestler) =

Japanese professional wrestler

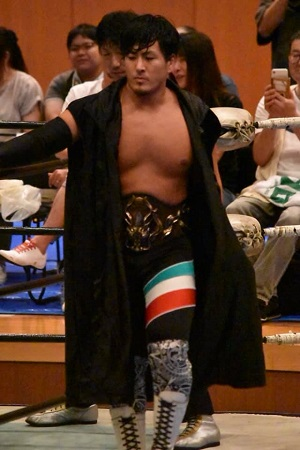
- Musashi in September 2019

Personal information
- Born: July 6, 1990 (age 36) Takizawa, Japan

Professional wrestling career
- Ring name(s): Daichi Sasaki; Musashi; Rey Amista; Bright Horse Chug Chug
- Billed height: 172 cm (5 ft 8 in)
- Billed weight: 76 kg (168 lb)
- Trained by: Taro Nohashi
- Debut: 2010

Daichi Sasaki (佐々木大地, Sasaki Daichi) better known by his ring name Musashi is a Japanese professional wrestler. He is signed to the Japanese promotion Michinoku Pro Wrestling, where he is a former Tohoku Junior Heavyweight Champion and a Tohoku Tag Team Champion. He is also currently competing on the Japanese independent scene.

== Professional wrestling career ==
=== Michinoku Pro Wrestling (2010–present) ===
Sasaki spent almost all of his career in Michinoku Pro Wrestling. He made his professional wrestling debut in the company on one of The Great Sasuke's 20th Anniversary series of events from June 11, 2010, where he fell short to Rasse in singles competition. He has held both of the promotion's signature titles. As for the Tohoku Tag Team Championship, he first won it by teaming up with his "New Phase" tag team partner Ayumu Gunji to defeat Mu no Taiyo (The Great Sasuke and Brahman Kei) at 3 Battles in March Tour from March 14, 2015. He has held the tag titles on one more occasion, alongside Kazuki Hashimoto after they defeated Bad Boy (Ken45° and Manjimaru) at July Series 2022: Rihikyokuchoku on July 17. As for the Tohoku Junior Heavyweight Championship, he first won it by defeating Kenbai at Golden Week Series 2019 on May 6. He has held the title on one more occasion by defeating Rui Hiugaji at Michinoku Pro Hyakka Ryoran: Junji Takehana Death 3rd Memorial Event on July 17, 2021.

=== Japanese independent circuit (2011–present) ===
Due to also making some freelancing work, Sasaki is known for his appearances in various promotions of the Japanese independent scene as a talent sent by Michinoku Pro Wrestling. He competed in a couple of matches promoted by Pro Wrestling Noah on June 4 and 5, 2014, at Noah Northern Navigation. On the first night from June 4, he competed twice. First against Masa Kitamiya and Taiji Ishimori in a three-way match, and secondly in a ten-man battle royal won by Ishimori and also involving various opponents such as Kenoh, Hitoshi Kumano, Maybach Taniguchi, Quiet Storm, Shane Haste and Yoshinari Ogawa. On the second night of the event from June 5, he defeated Hitoshi Kumano in singles competition. At Gleat G ProWrestling Ver. 9, he teamed up with Coelacanths (Cima and Kaz Hayashi) to defeat StrongHearts (El Lindaman, Issei Onitsuka and T-Hawk). At Gatoh Move ChocoPro #256, an event promoted by Gatoh Move Pro Wrestling on September 20, 2022, Sasaki teamed up with Yamaya Ringo in a losing effort against BestBros (Baliyan Akki and Mei Suruga). At BJW/DDT Toshikoshi Pro-Wrestling 2022, a cross-over one-day tournament held by both DDT Pro-Wrestling and Big Japan Pro Wrestling on December 31, 2022, he teamed up with Kazusada Higuchi and Kota Sekifuda to defeat team of Chris Brookes, Daisuke Sekimoto and Isami Kodaka in the first rounds, but fell short to Mao, Yuko Miyamoto and Yuya Aoki in the semifinals. At AJPW Dynamite Series 2023, an event promoted by All Japan Pro Wrestling on June 11, he teamed up with Kohei Sato and Zennichi Shin Jidai (Rising Hayato and Ryo Inoue) to defeat Atsuki Aoyagi, Dan Tamura, Oji Shiiba and Ren Ayabe in an eight-man tag team match. At BASARA 222 ~ Oensogura, an event promoted by Pro-Wrestling Basara on June 17, 2023, he battled Isami Kodaka into a time-limit draw. At Masaaki Mochizuki Produce Buyuden Rei ~ Zero ~ Vol. 2, an event promoted by Dragongate on July 8, 2023, Sasaki teamed up with Taro Nohashi in a losing effort against D'courage (Madoka Kikuta and Yuki Yoshioka).

=== New Japan Pro Wrestling (2023) ===
Sasaki made his debut in New Japan Pro Wrestling at the 2023 edition of the Super Junior Tag League where he teamed up wit Yoh as "Musashi Komatsu" and scored a total of eight points after competing against the teams of Catch 2/2 (TJP and Francesco Akira), El DespeWato (El Desperado and Master Wato), House Of Torture (Sho and Yoshinobu Kanemaru), Bullet Club War Dogs (Clark Connors and Drilla Moloney), Los Ingobernables de Japon (Bushi and Titán), Intergalactic Jet Setters (Kushida and Kevin Knight), Ichiban Sweet Boys (Robbie Eagles and Kosei Fujita), Just 5 Guys (Douki and Taka Michinoku), and Ryusuke Taguchi and The DKC. At Power Struggle 2023 on November 4, he again teamed up with Yoh to face some of the teams they competed against in the tag league such as Master Wato and El Desperado, Kosei Fujita and Robbie Eagles, and Drilla Moloney and Clark Connors in a four-way tag team match from which they came unsuccessful.

== Championships and accomplishments ==
- All Japan Pro Wrestling
  - World Junior Heavyweight Championship (1 time)
  - All Asia Tag Team Championship (3 time, current) – with Seiki Yoshioka
- Michinoku Pro Wrestling
  - Tohoku Junior Heavyweight Championship (3 times)
  - Tohoku Tag Team Championship (2 times) – with Kazuki Hashimoto (1) and Ayumu Gunji (1)
  - Our Fukumen Okama League (2021)
  - Okama Saikyou League (2020)
- Pro Wrestling Illustrated
  - Ranked No. 344 of the top 500 singles wrestlers in the PWI 500 in 2025
