= BJW Junior Heavyweight Championship (1998–2002) =

Professional wrestling championship

Details
- Promotion: Big Japan Pro Wrestling
- Date established: February 3, 1998
- Date retired: 2002
Statistics
- First champion(s): Yoshihiro Tajiri
- Final champion(s): Homicide
- Most reigns: Fantastik/Masayoshi Motegi/Charbinger/The Winger (3 reigns)
- Longest reign: Men's Teioh (424 days)
- Shortest reign: Johnny Kashmere (10 days)

The BJW Junior Heavyweight Championship was a title defended in the Japanese professional wrestling promotion Big Japan Pro Wrestling (BJW). It was in use from 1998 through at least November 2002.

On May 7, 2017, BJW announced that it was bringing back the BJW Junior Heavyweight Championship with a tournament set to take place between May 25 and July 17. Although the new title shares its name with the title retired in 2002, the winner of the tournament is considered the first BJW Junior Heavyweight Champion. The title has a weight limit of 95 kg (209 lb). Wrestlers over the weight limit will be eligible to challenge for the BJW World Strong Heavyweight Championship.

== Inaugural tournament ==
An eight-man knockout tournament was held on March 2, 1998 to crown the inaugural Junior Heavyweight Champion.

Quarterfinals
Yoshihiro Tajiri	Pin
Gran Naniwa
Minoru Tanaka	Pin
Minoru Fujita
Ryuji Yamakawa	Pin
Masayoshi Motegi
Gedo	Pin
Tomoaki Honma

Semifinals
Yoshihiro Tajiri	Pin
Minoru Tanaka
Ryuji Yamakawa	Pin
Gedo

Final
Yoshihiro Tajiri	Pin
Gedo

== Title history ==
Key
No.	Overall reign number
Reign	Reign number for the specific champion
Days	Number of days held
(NLT)	Championship change took place "no later than" the date listed

No.	Champion	Championship change			Reign statistics		Notes	Ref.
No.	Champion	Date	Event	Location	Reign	Days	Notes	Ref.
1	Yoshihiro Tajiri	February 3, 1998	First BJW Junior Heavyweight Title Tournament	Tokyo, Japan	1	75	Defeated Gedo in a tournament final to become the inaugural champion.	
—	Vacated	April 19, 1998	—	—	—	—	Tajiri was stripped of the title after he left BJW.	
2	Katsumi Usuda	May 1, 1998	Big Japan Fighter Declaration 1998	Toda, Japan	1	218	Defeated Minoru Fujita to win the vacant title.	
3	Fantastik	December 5, 1998	HWO 4 Year	Kanagawa, Japan	1	145		
4	The Winger	April 29, 1999	House show	Shizuoka, Japan	1	31		
—	Vacated	May 30, 1999	—	—	—	—	Vacated to be put on the line in a round-robin tournament.	
5	Masayoshi Motegi	June 30, 1999	House show	Numazu, Japan	1	129	Defeated Abdullah Kobayashi in the finals of a round-robin tournament to win the vacant title.	
6	Fantastik	November 6, 1999	House show	Hakodate, Japan	2	28		
7	Chabinger	December 4, 1999	House show	Yokohama, Japan	2	200	Previously held the title under the name Masayoshi Motegi.	
8	Men's Teioh	June 21, 2000	BJ Hardcore Series II 2000	Fukushima, Japan	1	424		
9	Johnny Kashmere	August 19, 2001	Universe 2001	Yokohama, Japan	1	10	Defeated Men's Teioh in a tag team match between CZW Tag Team Champions Men's Teioh and Jun Kasai and The Backseat Boyz (Kashmere and Trent Acid). As per the stipulation of the match, all titles held by the participants were on the line. The Backseat Boyz won the CZW Tag Team title, and Kashmere, by scoring the fall, won the BJW Junior Heavyweight title as well.	
—	Vacated	August 29, 2001	CZW Enough Is Enough	Sewell, NJ	—	—	Vacated when a double title match against CZW Junior Heavyweight Champion Trent Acid ended as a double pinfall.	
10	Ruckus	December 2, 2001	Ante Up 2001	Yokohama, Japan	1	13	Defeated Trent Acid and The Winger in a three-way match. This match was also for the CZW Junior Heavyweight Championship.	
11	Trent Acid	December 15, 2001	CZW Cage of Death III	Philadelphia, PA	1	78	This match was also for the CZW Junior Heavyweight Championship.	
12	The Winger	March 3, 2002	Harder Than Hardcore Series 2002	Yokohama, Japan	2	257		
13	Homicide	November 15, 2002	House show	Queens, NY	1	(Note: The exact date the championship was deactivated has not been confirmed, putting their title reign at between 1 day and 46 days.)		
—	Deactivated	2002 (NLT)	—	—	—	—		

== Combined reigns ==
¤	The exact length of at least one title reign is uncertain, so the shortest possible length is used.

Rank	Wrestler	No. of reigns	Combined days
1	Men's Teioh	1	424
2	Masayoshi Motegi/Chabinger	2	329
3	The Winger	2	288
4	Fantastik	2	173
5	Katsumi Usuda	1	218
6	Trent Acid	1	78
7	Yoshihiro Tajiri	1	75
8	Ruckus	1	13
9	Johnny Kashmere	1	10
10	Homicide	1	1¤

== See also ==
- BJW Junior Heavyweight Championship (2017–present)
