= Kyushu Pro-Wrestling =

Japanese professional wrestling promotion

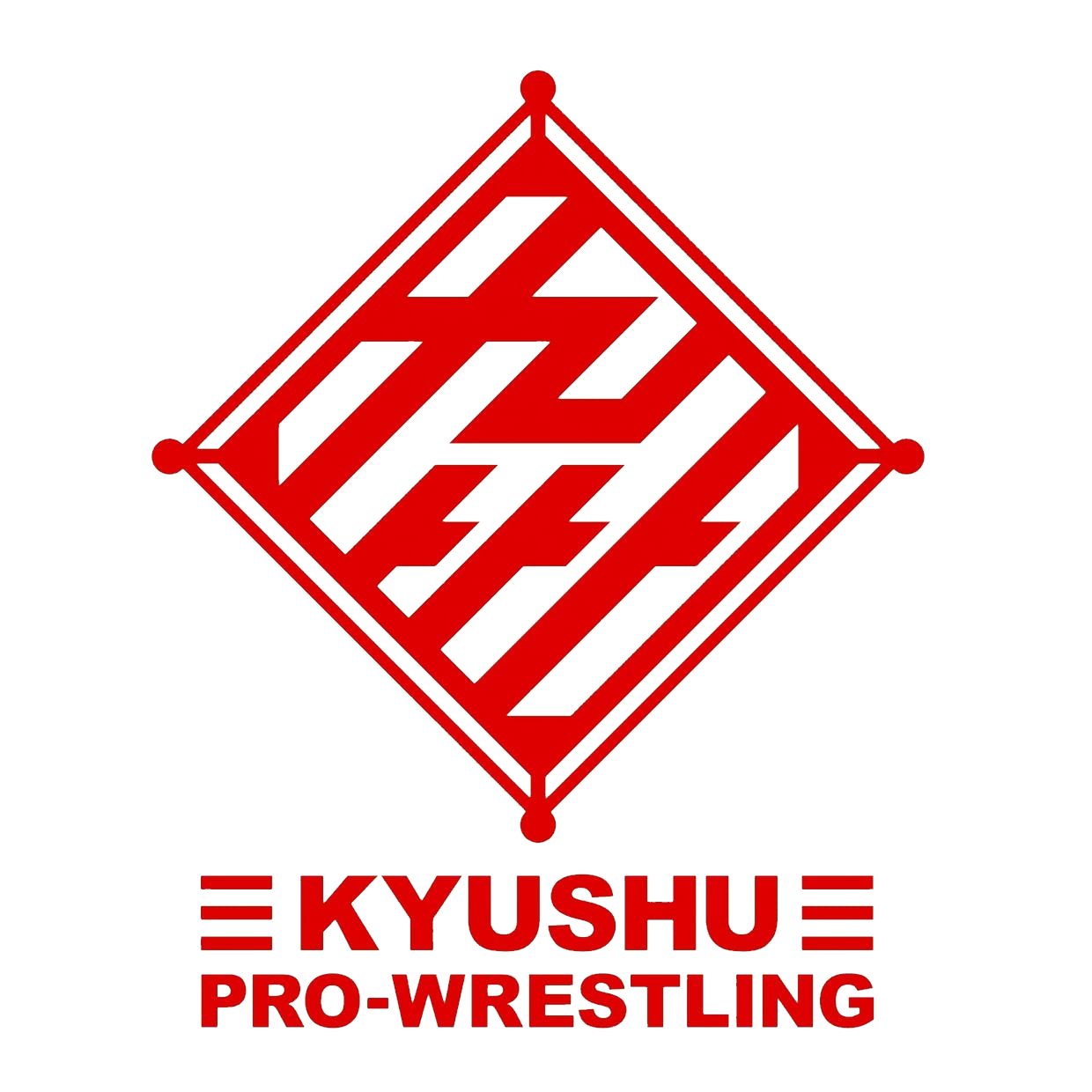
- Founded: October 16, 2007
- Style: Puroresu
- Headquarters: Fukuoka, Japan
- Founder: Ryota Chikuzen
- Owner: Ryota Chikuzen
- Website: www.kyushu-pro-wrestling.com

Kyushu Pro-Wrestling (Japanese: 九州プロレス, Hepburn: Kyūshū Puroresu) is a Japanese professional wrestling promotion based in Fukuoka, the largest city on the Japanese island of Kyushu. The promotion was founded in late 2007 by Kaientai Dojo alumnus Ryota Chikuzen, and officially launched on July 6, 2008. A notable feature of the promotion is that it is the first professional wrestling promotion to operate as a nonprofit organization. The promotion has its own dojo located in an auto repair shop, in Higashi-ku, Fukuoka.

In addition to wrestling matches, the organization also conducts charity activities at nursing homes, facilities for the disabled, children's homes, and preschools, and offers wrestling classes at free schools.

== History ==
On October 16, 2007, Kyushu Pro-Wrestling was registered by Ryota Chikuzen as the world's first nonprofit professional wrestling promotion. Chikuzen then officially left Kaientai Dojo on December 15 to run the promotion in his native Kyushu.

On February 5, 2008, a press conference was held at the Fukuoka City Hall to announce the establishment of the promotion. On May 11, a pre-launch event entitled "I'm back!" (帰ってきたバイ!!, Ittekita-bai!!) was held in Kasuya, Fukuoka. On July 6, the official launch event "Kinniku Yamakasa" (筋肉山笠) was held at the Nishitetsu Hall in Fukuoka, in front of 464 people. In the main event, the team of Ryota Chikuzen and Mentai☆Kid defeated Omega (Shiori Asahi and Yuji Hino).

On July 7, 2018, the promotion celebrated its 10th anniversary at Kinniku Yamakasa '18, at the Fukuoka Kokusai Center.

On April 5, 2021, Kyushu Pro-Wrestling launched their newest show Monday Night Vai!, a free monthly show that airs on their YouTube channel.

On January 3, 2022, the promotion held their first event outside of Kyushu at Shinjuku Face in Tokyo. On October 4, Kyushu Pro-Wrestling held their first event at Korakuen Hall, the first day of the 2022 Glocal Tag Tournament.

On January 3, 2023, at Jokyo 2023, Tajiri won the Kyushu Pro-Wrestling Championship, and then announced that he had signed with the promotion. On August 6, the promotion's 15th Anniversary event drew 4,024 people to the Fukuoka Kokusai Center, and for the first time, the event was broadcast on terrestrial television by the Fukuoka Broadcasting System later that night.

On July 17, 2024, the United Japan Pro-Wrestling Association held a general meeting in Tokyo, where Kyushu Pro-Wrestling was admitted into the association.

== Roster ==
Ring name	Real name	Unit	Notes
Asosan	Unknown	Main unit	
Batten×Burabura	Keiichiro Sueoka	Main unit	
Gabai-jichan	Unknown	Main unit	
Genkai	Daiyu Kawauchi	Genbu-kai	
Hitamaru Sasaki	Kyosuke Sasaki	Genbu-kai	
Jet Wei	Unknown	Main unit	Signed to Puzzle
Kenichiro Arai	Kenichiro Arai	Main unit	Signed to Dragon Gate
Kisshern	Unknown	Genbu-kai	
Kodai Nozaki	Kodai Nozaki	Main unit	Kyushu Pro-Wrestling Champion
Koyo Ume	Koyo Ume	Main unit	
Minoru Fujita	Minoru Fujita	Main unit	Freelancer
Naoki Sakurajima	Naoki Setoguchi	Main unit	
One☆Kyushu	Yukihiro Shigeno	Main unit	Alter ego of Shima Shigeno
Ryota Chikuzen	Ryoji Shiiba	Main unit	President
Shima Shigeno	Yukihiro Shigeno	Main unit	
Shirokuma	Unknown	Main unit	
Tajiri	Yoshihiro Tajiri	Main unit	Kyushu Pro-Wrestling Tag Team Champion

== Championships and accomplishments ==
Championship	Current champion(s)	Reign	Date won	Days held	Successful defenses	Location	Notes	Ref.
Kyushu Pro-Wrestling Championship	Kodai Nozaki	4	June 27, 2026	1+	0	Fukuoka, Japan	Defeated Genkai at Kyushu Super Genki Matsuri: Kyushu Pro 18th Anniversary.	
Kyushu Pro-Wrestling Tag Team Championship	Yuji Nagata and Tajiri	1 (1, 2)	February 14, 2026	134+	2	Kurume, Japan	Defeated JeTank1997 (Kodai Nozaki and Jet Wei) at Kurume Genki Matsuri 2026.	

=== Kyushu Pro-Wrestling Championship ===
Kyushu Pro-Wrestling Championship
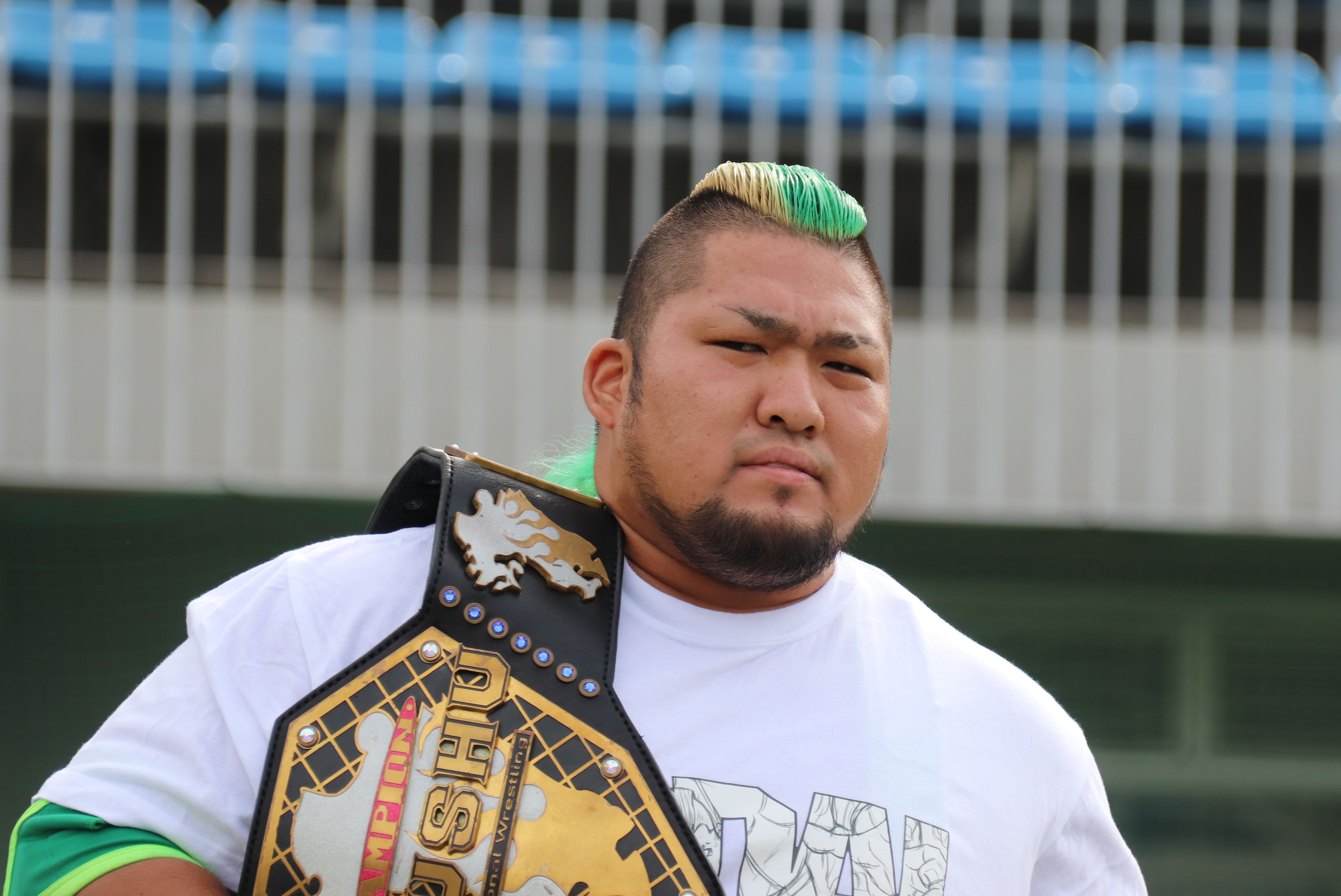
- Kodai Nozaki with the current design of the belt

Details
- Promotion: Kyushu Pro-Wrestling
- Date established: March 20, 2012
- Current champion: Kodai Nozaki
- Date won: June 27, 2026
Statistics
- First champion: Ryota Chikuzen
- Most reigns: Genkai (5 reigns)
- Longest reign: Mentai☆Kid (889 days)
- Shortest reign: Tajiri (33 days)
- Oldest champion: Tajiri (52 years, 96 days)
- Youngest champion: Kodai Nozaki (24 years, 357 days)

The Kyushu Pro-Wrestling Championship (Japanese: 九州プロレス王座, Hepburn: Kyūshū Puroresu Ōza) is a professional wrestling championship created and promoted by Kyushu Pro-Wrestling. It is the top title of the company and has been held by a total of 12 champions in 20 different recognized reigns. The current champion is Kodai Nozaki who is in his fourth reign.

Key
No.	Overall reign number
Reign	Reign number for the specific champion
Days	Number of days held
Defenses	Number of successful defenses
+	Current reign is changing daily

No.	Champion	Championship change			Reign statistics			Notes	Ref.
No.	Champion	Date	Event	Location	Reign	Days	Defenses	Notes	Ref.
1	Ryota Chikuzen	March 20, 2012	Saikyo Kyushudanji Tournament	Fukuoka, Japan	1	313	1	Defeated Hideyoshi in the final of a 16-man tournament to become the inaugural champion.	
2	Asosan	January 27, 2013	Kitakyushu ba Genki ni Suru bai! '13	Kitakyushu, Japan	1	169	1		
3	Genkai	July 15, 2013	Kyushu Pro 5th Anniversary: Kinniku Yamakasa '13	Fukuoka, Japan	1	755	6		
4	Mentai☆Kid	August 9, 2015	Kyushu Pro 7th Anniversary: Kinniku Yamakasa '15	Fukuoka, Japan	1	889	8		
5	Kazuaki Mihara	January 14, 2018	Kitakyushu ba Genki ni Suru bai! '18	Kitakyushu, Japan	1	56	1		
6	Genkai	March 11, 2018	Kinniku Tobiume '18	Fukuoka, Japan	2	364	1		
7	Yuji Hino	March 10, 2019	Kinniku Tobiume '19	Fukuoka, Japan	1	508	2		
8	Genkai	July 30, 2020	Kyushu Pro 12th Anniversary: Kinniku Yamakasa '20	Kumamoto, Japan	3	340	2		
9	Kengo Mashimo	July 5, 2021	Monday Night Vai! #4	Fukuoka, Japan	1	182	1	This was a three-way match also involving Gaina.	
10	Genkai	January 3, 2022	Monday Night Vai! #10: Jōkyō	Tokyo, Japan	4	220	1	This was a three-way match also involving Gaina.	
11	Kodai Nozaki	August 11, 2022	Kyushu Pro 14th Anniversary	Fukuoka, Japan	1	145	0		
12	Tajiri	January 3, 2023	Jōkyō 2023	Tokyo, Japan	1	33	0		
13	Mentai☆Kid	February 5, 2023	Kitakyushu Genki Matsuri 2023	Kitakyushu, Japan	2	182	1		
14	Kodai Nozaki	August 6, 2023	Kyushu Pro 15th Anniversary	Fukuoka, Japan	2	189	4	This was a three-way match also involving Genkai.	
15	Daisuke Sekimoto	February 11, 2024	Kitakyushu Genki Matsuri 2024	Kitakyushu, Japan	1	175	3		
16	Kodai Nozaki	August 4, 2024	Kyushu Super Genki Matsuri: Kyushu Pro 16th Anniversary	Fukuoka, Japan	3	204	3		
17	Shuji Ishikawa	February 24, 2025	Kurume Genki Matsuri	Kurume, Japan	1	181	1		
18	Hitamaru Sasaki	August 24, 2025	Kumamoto ba Genki ni Suru bai!	Kumamoto, Japan	1	196	3		
19	Genkai	March 8, 2026	Kitakyushu Genki Matsuri 2026	Kitakyushu, Japan	5	111	0		
20	Kodai Nozaki	June 27, 2026	Kyushu Super Genki Matsuri: Kyushu Pro 18th Anniversary	Fukuoka, Japan	4	1+	0		

==== Combined reigns ====
As of June 28, 2026.

†	Indicates the current champions

Rank	Wrestler	No. of reigns	Combined defenses	Combined days
1	Genkai	5	10	1,790
2	Mentai☆Kid	2	9	1,071
3	Kodai Nozaki †	4	7	539+
4	Yuji Hino	1	2	508
5	Ryota Chikuzen	1	1	313
6	Hitamaru Sasaki	1	3	196
7	Kengo Mashimo	1	1	182
8	Shuji Ishikawa	1	1	181
9	Daisuke Sekimoto	1	3	175
10	Asosan	1	1	169
11	Kazuaki Mihara	1	1	56
12	Tajiri	1	0	33

=== Kyushu Pro-Wrestling Tag Team Championship ===
Kyushu Pro-Wrestling Tag Team Championship

Details
- Promotion: Kyushu Pro-Wrestling
- Date established: December 4, 2016
- Current champions: Yuji Nagata and Tajiri
- Date won: February 14, 2026
Statistics
- First champions: Umihebi (Genkai and Hub)
- Most reigns: Naoki Sakurajima (3 reigns)
- Longest reign: Umihebi (Genkai and Hub) (364 days)
- Shortest reign: Hitamaru Sasaki and Asosan (42 days)

The Kyushu Pro-Wrestling Tag Team Championship (Japanese: 九州プロレスタッグ王座, Hepburn: Kyūshū Puroresu Taggu Ōza) is a professional wrestling tag team championship created and promoted by Kyushu Pro-Wrestling. The title has been held by a total of 17 teams composed of 28 distinctive champions in 18 different recognized reigns. The current champions are Yuji Nagata and Tajiri who are in their first reign.

Key
No.	Overall reign number
Reign	Reign number for the specific team—reign numbers for the individuals are in parentheses, if different
Days	Number of days held
Defenses	Number of successful defenses
+	Current reign is changing daily

No.	Champion	Championship change			Reign statistics			Notes	Ref.
No.	Champion	Date	Event	Location	Reign	Days	Defenses	Notes	Ref.
1	Umihebi (Genkai and Hub)	December 4, 2016	Hakata Hanamidori Cup 1 Day Tag Team Tournament: Kinniku Seimon Barai '16	Fukuoka, Japan	1	364	4	Defeated Asosan and Seiki Yoshioka in the final of the Hakata Hanamidori Cup 1 Day Tag Team Tournament to become the inaugural champions.	
2	Yamamizuki (Hitamaru Sasaki and Asosan)	December 3, 2017	Hakata Hanamidori Cup 1 Day Tag Team Tournament: Kinniku Seimon Barai '17	Fukuoka, Japan	1	42	0	This was the final of the Hakata Hanamidori Cup 1 Day Tag Team Tournament.	
3	Ryota Chikuzen and Yuji Hino	January 14, 2018	Kitakyushu ba Genki ni Suru bai! '18	Kitakyushu, Japan	1	174	1		
4	Naoki Sakurajima and Kazuaki Mihara	July 7, 2018	Kyushu Pro 10th Anniversary: Kinniku Yamakasa '18	Fukuoka, Japan	1	101	0		
—	Vacated	October 16, 2018	—	—	—	—	—	Vacated due to Kazuaki Mihara suffering a knee injury.	
5	Kaizoku Musō (Genkai and Minoru Fujita)	December 2, 2018	Hakata Hanamidori Cup 1 Day Tag Team Tournament: Kinniku Seimon Barai '18	Fukuoka, Japan	1 (2, 1)	126	0	Defeated #StrongHearts (Cima and El Lindaman) in the final of the Hakata Hanamidori Cup 1 Day Tag Team Tournament to win the vacant title.	
6	Tsubabilly (Tsubasa and Billyken Kid)	April 7, 2019	Kitakyushu ba Genki ni Suru bai! '19	Kitakyushu, Japan	1	294	4		
7	Naoki Sakurajima and Kazuaki Mihara	January 26, 2020	Kitakyushu ba Genki ni Suru bai! '20	Kitakyushu, Japan	2	186	0		
8	Tōryūmon Generations (Genki Horiguchi and Susumu Yokosuka)	July 30, 2020	Kyushu Pro 12th Anniversary: Kinniku Yamakasa '20	Kumamoto, Japan	1	340	3	This was a three-way tag team match also involving the team of Minoru Fujita and Kenichiro Arai. In December 2020, Horiguchi and Yokosuka reformed the Natural Vibes stable and started defending the title under that name.	
9	Mujūryoku Heroes (Mentai☆Kid and Alejandro)	July 5, 2021	Monday Night Vai! #4	Fukuoka, Japan	1	43	0		
—	Vacated	August 17, 2021	—	—	—	—	—	Vacated due to Alejandro joining Pro Wrestling Noah full time.	
10	Gaina and Taro Nohashi	December 6, 2021	Monday Night Vai! #9: Glocal Tag Tournament 2021	Fukuoka, Japan	1	237	1	Defeated Mentai☆Kid and Kodai Nozaki in the final of the Glocal Tag Tournament 2021 to win the vacant title.	
11	Barikara High Tension (Mentai☆Kid and Kaji Tomato)	July 31, 2022	Kitakyushu Genki Matsuri 2022	Kitakyushu, Japan	1 (2, 1)	156	0		
12	Sugi and Raicho	January 3, 2023	Jōkyō 2023	Tokyo, Japan	1	124	0		
13	Kusuo (Hitamaru Sasaki and Kota Umeda)	May 7, 2023	Kasuga ba Genki ni Suru bai!	Kasuga, Japan	1 (2, 1)	357	4		
14	Doikuma (Koji Doi and Kumaarashi)	April 28, 2024	Kumamoto ba Genki ni Suru bai!	Kumamoto, Japan	1	161	2		
15	Asosan and Naoki Sakurajima	October 6, 2024	Chikugo ba Genki ni Suru bai!	Chikugo, Japan	1 (2, 3)	203	2		
16	Tajiri and Shiho	April 27, 2025	Kyushu Super Genki Matsuri: Kyushu Pro 17th Anniversary	Kitakyushu, Japan	1	147	2		
17	JeTank1997 (Kodai Nozaki and Jet Wei)	September 21, 2025	Ōmuta ba Genki ni Suru bai!	Ōmuta, Japan	1	146	0		
18	Yuji Nagata and Tajiri	February 14, 2026	Kurume Genki Matsuri 2026	Kurume, Japan	1 (1, 2)	134+	2		

==== Combined reigns ====
As of June 28, 2026.

†	Indicates the current champions

By team

Rank	Team	No. of reigns	Combined defenses	Combined days
1	Umihebi (Genkai and Hub)	1	4	364
2	Kusuo (Hitamaru Sasaki and Kota Umeda)	1	4	357
3	Tōryūmon Generations (Genki Horiguchi and Susumu Yokosuka)	1	3	340
4	Tsubabilly (Tsubasa and Billyken Kid)	1	4	294
5	Naoki Sakurajima and Kazuaki Mihara	2	0	287
6	Gaina and Taro Nohashi	1	1	237
7	Asosan and Naoki Sakurajima	1	2	203
8	Ryota Chikuzen and Yuji Hino	1	1	174
9	Doikuma (Koji Doi and Kumaarashi)	1	2	161
10	Barikara High Tension (Mentai☆Kid and Kaji Tomato)	1	0	156
11	Tajiri and Shiho	1	2	147
12	JeTank1997 (Kodai Nozaki and Jet Wei)	1	0	146
13	Yuji Nagata and Tajiri	1	2	134+
14	Kaizoku Musō (Genkai and Minoru Fujita)	1	0	126
15	Sugi and Raicho	1	0	124
16	Mujūryoku Heroes (Mentai☆Kid and Alejandro)	1	0	43
17	Yamamizuki (Hitamaru Sasaki and Asosan)	1	0	42

By wrestler

Rank	Wrestler	No. of reigns	Combined defenses	Combined days
1	Naoki Sakurajima	3	2	490
1	Genkai	2	4	490
3	Hitamaru Sasaki	2	4	399
4	Hub	1	4	364
5	Kota Umeda	1	4	357
6	Genki Horiguchi	1	3	340
6	Susumu Yokosuka	1	3	340
8	Billyken Kid	1	4	294
8	Tsubasa	1	4	294
10	Kazuaki Mihara	2	0	287
11	Tajiri †	2	4	281+
12	Asosan	2	2	245
13	Gaina	1	1	237
13	Taro Nohashi	1	1	237
15	Mentai☆Kid	2	0	199
16	Ryota Chikuzen	1	1	174
16	Yuji Hino	1	1	174
18	Koji Doi	1	2	161
18	Kumaarashi	1	2	161
20	Kaji Tomato	1	0	156
21	Shiho	1	2	147
22	Kodai Nozaki	1	0	146
22	Jet Wei	1	0	146
24	Yuji Nagata †	1	2	134+
25	Minoru Fujita	1	0	126
26	Raicho	1	0	124
26	Sugi	1	0	124
28	Alejandro	1	0	43

=== Tournaments ===
Accomplishment	Last winner(s)	Date won	Location	Notes
Glocal Tag Tournament	Hub and Tigers Mask	December 3, 2022	Fukuoka, Japan	Defeated Mentai☆Kid and Kodai Nozaki in the tournament final.

== See also ==
- Professional wrestling in Japan
- List of professional wrestling promotions in Japan
