= Hub (wrestler) =

Japanese professional wrestler

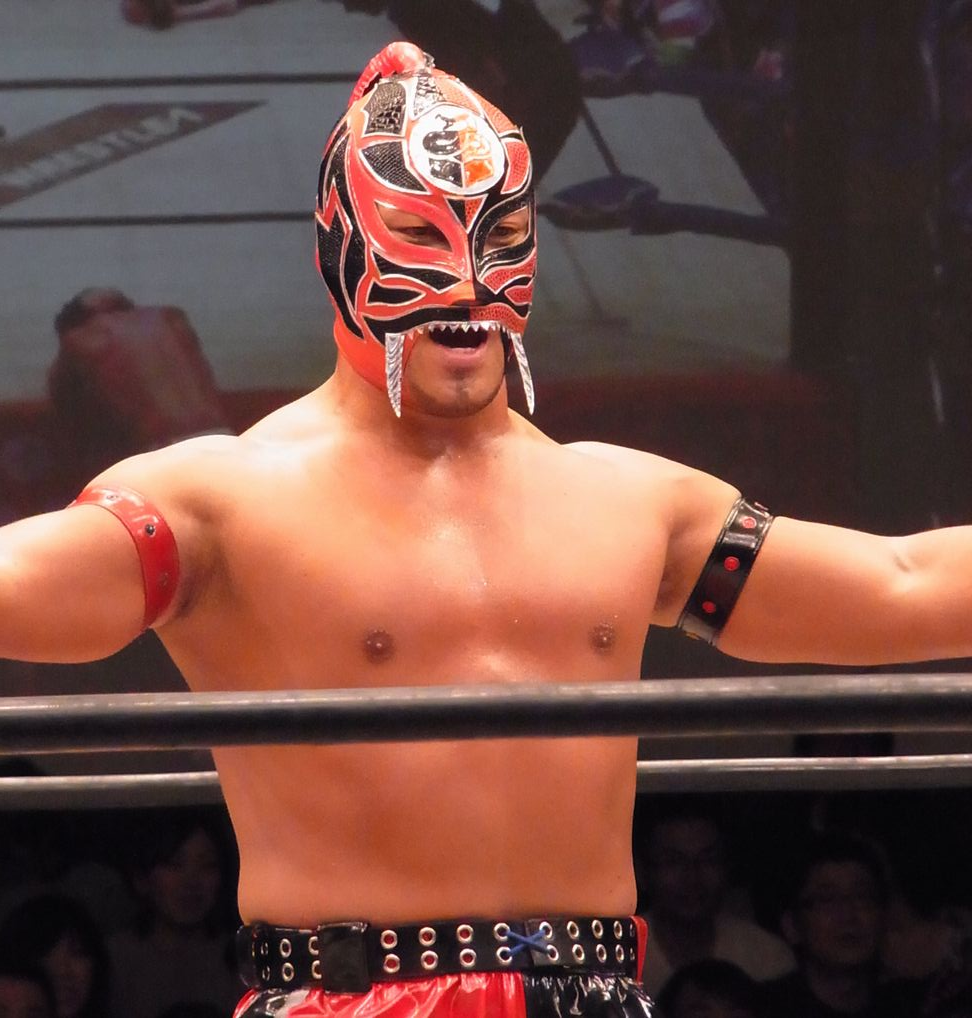
- Hub in November 2013

Personal information
- Born: August 7, 1978 (age 48) Shimada, Japan

Professional wrestling career
- Ring names: Kaijin Habu Otoko; Super Demekin; Super Dolphin; Goa; Hub; Zero
- Billed height: 166 cm (5 ft 5 in)
- Billed weight: 85 kg (187 lb)
- Trained by: Super Delfin
- Debut: April 29, 1999

Yuto Kigawa (木川 勇人, Kigawa Yūto; born September 20, 1986), better known by the ring name Hub (stylized in all caps and previously as Kaijin Habu Otoko (怪人ハブ男; meaning "Mysterious Viper Man")) is a Japanese luchador enmascarado, or masked professional wrestler. He is best known for his tenures with Osaka Pro Wrestling and Super Delfin's Okinawa Pro Wrestling. In his career, he has appeared for several major promotions, including New Japan Pro-Wrestling, Dragongate, DDT Pro-Wrestling, Big Japan Pro Wrestling, Pro Wrestling Zero1, and Michinoku Pro Wrestling. His gimmick involves him taking the role of a snake known as the "Sacred Viper".

== Professional wrestling career ==
=== Independent circuit (1999–present) ===
During his career, Hub has made appearances for various independent promotions. On the first night of the Cherry Blossom Tour 2014, an event promoted by Wrestle-1 (W-1), Hub teamed with Tigers Mask to defeat the Junior Stars (Koji Kanemoto and Minoru Tanaka).

On July 24, 2020, at STRONGHEARTS Action 2 Alpha, an event promoted by Oriental Wrestling Entertainment (OWE), Hub teamed with Dick Togo, Eisa8, and Gaina in an eight-man tag team match, losing to StrongHearts (El Lindaman, Issei Onitsuka, Shigehiro Irie, and T-Hawk).

On May 23, 2021, Hub participated in the Hana Kimura Memorial Show, an event produced by Kyoko Kimura to commemorate the first anniversary of the death of her daughter, Hana Kimura. During the event, he teamed with Shisaou and Eisa8 to defeat Shota, Fuma, and Mil Mongoose in a six-man tag team match.

==== DDT Pro-Wrestling/Pro-Wrestling Basara (2011–present) ====
Hub has made occasional appearances for DDT Pro Wrestling (DDT), primarily in tag team matches. At Dramatic Dreams! Vol.5, he teamed with Masahiro Takanashi to defeat Men's Teioh and Yasu Urano. On May 25, 2019, at Dramatic Dreams! Vol. 6, he and Isami Kodaka secured a victory over the Disaster-Box team of Naomi Yoshimura and Yuki Ueno.

At Dramatic Dreams Vol. 7 on October 18, 2020, Hub teamed with Yuki Ueno in a losing effort against Konosuke Takeshita and Billy Ken Kid. He also appeared at DAMNATION Produce Illegal Assembly Returns Vol. 3 on February 19, 2021, where he and Yasutaka Oosera were defeated by Damnation's Daisuke Sasaki and Hiroshi Yamato.

Hub usually works under the Pro-Wrestling Basara (Basara) branch of the promotion, making appearances at events such as the Osaka Beer Garden Pro-Wrestling on July 22, 2018, where he teamed up with Iron Priest (Fuma and Yusuke Kubo) in a losing effort against Isami Kodaka, Ryota Nakatsu and Ryuichi Sekine. His most notable victory in Basara took place at BJW Osaka Surprise 52 ~ Proud Ruler, an event produced in partnership with Big Japan Pro Wrestling on July 4, 2021, where he teamed up with Andy Wu and Ultimate Spider Jr. to defeat Viva México Cabrones (Billy Ken Kid, Masamune, and Tsubasa) for the UWA World Trios Championship.

==== Dragon Gate (2012–2013) ====
Hub had a brief tenure with the Dragon Gate (DG) promotion. He is known for participating in the Gate of Destiny series of events, marking his most important victory at the 2012 edition on October 21, where he teamed up with Magnitude Kishiwada and Gamma as part of the "Team Veteran Returns" stable to defeat Mad Blankey's Akira Tozawa, BxB Hulk and Naoki Tanisaki for the Open the Triangle Gate Championship.

==== New Japan Pro Wrestling (2008–2012) ====
Hub made several appearances at shows hosted by New Japan Pro Wrestling (NJPW). At NJPW Exciting Battle In Okinawa on January 22, 2010, he teamed up with Golden Pine, Jushin Thunder Liger and Super Delfin, scoring a victory over Menso-re Oyaji, Mil Mongoose, Ryusuke Taguchi and Super Shisa in an eight-man tag team match. Hub continued to work in these kinds of matches following his appearance at NJPW Exciting Battle In Okinawa on March 25, 2011, where he teamed up with Kijimuna, Ryusuke Taguchi and Super Shisa to successfully challenge Gurukun Diver, Jushin Thunder Liger, Menso-re Oyaji and Mil Mongoose. His las match for NJPW took place at the 40th Anniversary Tour of the company from March 25, 2012, where he teamed up with Gurukun Diver and Ryusuke Taguchi to defeat Eisa8, Kushida and Menso-re Oyaji.

==== Osaka Pro–Wrestling (1999–present) ====
Hub made his professional wrestling debut in Osaka Pro Wrestling (Osaka Pro) at the very first event promoted by the company on April 29, 1999 as Super Demekin, where he lost to Magnitude Kishiwada. He is a former Osaka Tag Team Champion, a title he won for the first time on December 15, 2007 at the Michinoku Pro National Tour alongside his long-time tag partner Gaina after defeating Kagetora and Rasse. He is also a former Osaka Openweight Champion, a title he last won at Osaka Pro in Konohana on July 31, 2016, after defeating Tadasuke.

Hub is known for taking part in various Osaka Hurricane events. The first match took place at the 2005 edition of the event, where he defeated Magnitude Kishiwada to win the Osaka Pro Wrestling Championship. At the 2006 edition, competing under the name of Super Dolphin, he defeated his trainer Super Delfin to win the Osaka Pro Wrestling Championship once again.

== Championships and accomplishments ==
- Dove Pro Wrestling
  - Dove Pro Tag Team Championship (1 time) – with Gaina
- Dotonbori Pro Wrestling
  - WDW Tag Team Championship (1 time) – with Orochi
- Dragon Gate
  - Open the Triangle Gate Championship (1 time) – with Magnitude Kishiwada and Gamma
- Kyushu Pro-Wrestling
  - Kyushu Pro-Wrestling Tag Team Championship (1 time) – with Genkai
  - Glocal Tag Tournament (2022) – with Tigers Mask
- Pro-Wrestling Basara
  - UWA World Trios Championship (1 time) – with Andy Wu and Ultimate Spider Jr.
- Okinawa Pro Wrestling
  - Okinawa Wrestling Championship (2 times)
  - MWF World Tag Team Championship (2 times) – with Shisaou (1) and Menso-re Oyaji (1)
- Osaka Pro Wrestling
  - Osaka Openweight Championship (2 times)
  - Osaka Tag Team Championship (2 times) – with Gaina
  - Tennōzan (2005)
- Pro Wrestling Zero1
  - International Junior Heavyweight Championship (2 times)
  - NWA World Junior Heavyweight Championship (2 times)
  - NWA International Lightweight Tag Team Championship (2 times) – with Takuya Sugawara (1) and Billy Ken Kid (1)
  - Tenkaichi Junior (2013, 2019)
- Tenryu Project
  - WAR International Junior Heavyweight Championship (1 time)
- Tokyo Gurentai
  - Tokyo Intercontinental Tag Team Championship (1 time) – with Mazada
- VKF Pro Wrestling
  - VKF King Of Wrestle Naniwa Championship (1 time)
