= Ayumu Gunji =

Japanese professional wrestler

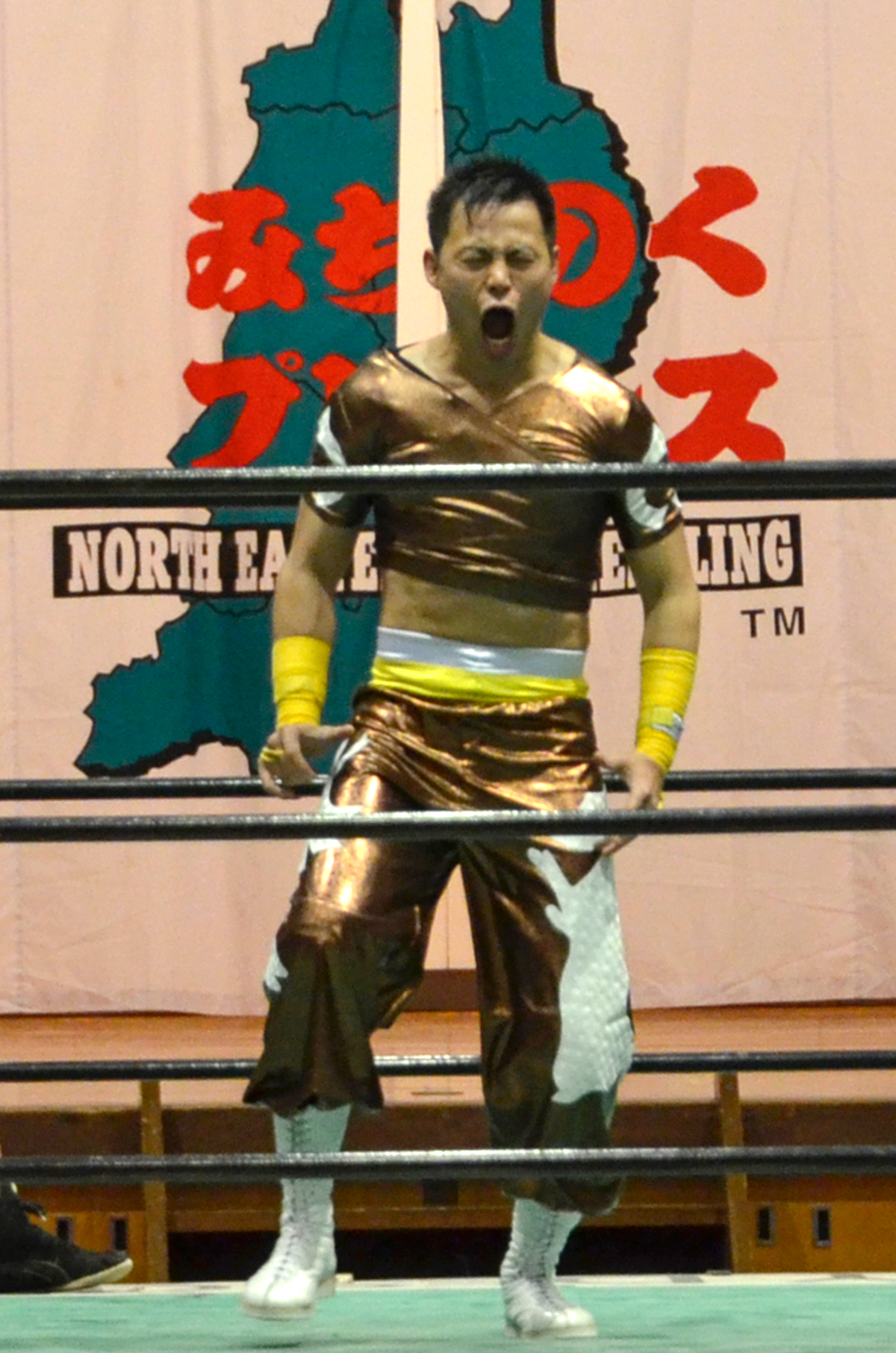
- Gunji in March 2016

Personal information
- Born: 26 August 1985 (age 40) Ugo, Japan

Professional wrestling career
- Ring name: Ayumu Gunji Diablo del Norte Ringo Gunji Super Boracho
- Billed height: 175 cm (5 ft 9 in)
- Billed weight: 85 kg (187 lb)
- Trained by: Taro Nohashi
- Debut: 2012

Ayumu Gunji (郡司歩, Gunji Ayumu) is a Japanese professional wrestler signed to Michinoku Pro Wrestling where he is a former two-time Tohoku Junior Heavyweight Champion. He is also known for briefly competing in the Japanese independent scene.

== Professional wrestling career ==
=== Michinoku Pro Wrestling (2012–present) ===
Gunji made his professional wrestling debut in Michinoku Pro Wrestling at Michinoku Pro Start of New Year Fighting 2012 on January 14, where he fell short to Daichi Sasaki in singles competition. During his over one decade tenure with the company, Gunji won the Tohoku Tag Team Championship on two separate occasions, once alongside "New Phase" tag team partner Daichi Sasaki (later known as Musashi) and once alongside "Super Stars" stablemate Rui Hiugaji. He competed in various of the promotion's signature events such as the Kanjin Oogama League, in which he made his first appearance at the 2023 edition where he competed against Taro Nohashi, Musashi, OSO11 and Ringo Yamaya in the first phases, then fell short to OSO11 in the finals.

=== Japanese independent scene (2014–present) ===
Gunji rarely steps away of the Michinoku Pro ring to compete in various events from the Japanese independent circuit. At Gatoh Move One And Only, an event promoted by Gatoh Move Pro Wrestling on February 13, 2017, he teamed up with Daichi Sasaki to unsuccessfully challenge reigning champions Bad Company (Golem Thai and P-Nutz), and DJ Nira and Masahiro Takanashi for the SPW Southeast Asian Tag Team Championships promoted by Singapore Pro Wrestling.

== Championships and accomplishments ==
- Michinoku Pro Wrestling
  - Tohoku Tag Team Championship (2 times) – with Daichi Sasaki (1) and Rui Hiugaji (1)
  - UWA World Tag Team Championship (1 time) – with Rui Hiugaji
  - Ink Ray Bull Tag Tournament (2013) – with Taro Nohashi
