= Katsumi Usuda =

Japanese professional wrestler

Personal information
- Born: March 17, 1970 (age 56) Hachioji, Tokyo, Japan

Professional wrestling career
- Billed height: 176 cm (5 ft 9 in)
- Billed weight: 86 kg (190 lb)
- Trained by: Yoshiaki Fujiwara
- Debut: October 29, 1993
- Retired: October 28, 2015

Katsumi Usuda (臼田勝美, Usuda Katsumi; born March 17, 1970) is a Japanese retired professional wrestler. Debuting for Pro Wrestling Fujiwara Gumi (PWFG) in 1993, he is best known for his work in Battlarts, where he was a 2 time Independent World Junior Heavyweight Champion.

Usuda is also known for his appearances in Pro Wrestling Zero-One, Fighting World of Japan Pro Wrestling, Big Mouth Loud, and Fu-Ten.

== Career ==
=== Pro Wrestling Fujiwara Gumi (1993–1995) ===
A student of Yoshiaki Fujiwara, Usuda debuted in Pro Wrestling Fujiwara Gumi at the age of 23, going to a 30 minute time limit draw with Carl Greco. He took part in the 1994 Challenge Cup, where he was beaten by Shoichi Funaki in the final. After 2 years and limited success in PWFG, Usuda and the rest of the roster all followed Yuki Ishikawa in an exodus on November 19, 1995, after Ishikawa discovered that the sponsors of Fujiwara Gumi planned to massively restructure the roster and change the landscape of the entire promotion.

=== Battlarts ===
The entirety of the PWFG roster (bar Fujiwara himself) jumped to Battlarts, including Usuda, who was pushed as a top star in the junior heavyweight division and primarily feuded with Minoru Tanaka, with the two trading victories back and forth early in the promotions life. In 1998, Usuda won his first championship, beating Minoru Fujita for the BJW Junior Heavyweight Championship. Usuda successfully defended the belt against Carl Greco and Ikuto Hidaka, before dropping the title to Fantastik in December. In May 1999, he partnered up with Carl Greco to win the Onikobe Tag Team Tournament, beating Daisuke Ikeda & Ikuto Hidaka in the final. Usuda's stock in Battlarts continued to rise, and on May 11, 2000 he beat longtime rival Minoru Tanaka to win the Independent World Junior Heavyweight Championship. His reign was short-lived, however, as he lost the belt to newcomer Naoyuki Taira in June. He also competed in New Japan Pro-Wrestling (NJPW)'s Best of the Super Juniors in June 2000, finishing last in the whole tournament with just four points. Usuda managed to get back to winning form in late 2000, beating Taira in November to win back the Independent Junior Title, and also winning the 6 Man Elimination Tag Team Tournament with Hiroyoshi Kotsubo & Takeshi Ono in December. After Battlarts closed its doors in late 2001, Usuda was forced to vacate the Junior title and go freelance.

=== Freelance (2001–2015) ===
==== Zero-One (2002–2003) ====
Usuda initially jumped to Pro Wrestling Zero-One but saw limited success, usually competing on the losing end of tag team matches. Despite this, he briefly reunited with his mentor Yoshiaki Fujiwara, forming a short-lived tag team in mid-2003.

==== WJ (2003–2004) ====
In October 2003, Usuda jumped to Riki Choshu's new Fighting World of Japan Pro Wrestling, beating Jose Maximo in his debut. During his time in WJ, Usuda was largely used as a measuring stick for younger wrestlers, regularly facing and beating the rookies of the roster. Usuda remained with WJ until it closed its doors in mid-2004.

==== Fu-Ten and Big Mouth Loud (2005–2015) ====
Usuda was one of a number of shoot-style wrestlers who joined the newborn Big Mouth Loud in 2005, working a number of matches for the short-lived promotion. He would later join and finally settle in old rival Daisuke Ikeda's Fu-Ten promotion, beating Kota Ibushi on the debut show. Usuda main evented the second and third shows, losing to Ikeda in tag team action twice with Kazunari Murakami and Yuki Ishikawa as his respective partners. Usuda continued to make sporadic appearances until October 2015 when he announced his retirement from wrestling. In his last match, Usuda lost to arguably his biggest rival Minoru Tanaka in a Fujiwara-Gumi Rules Match.

== Championships and accomplishments ==
- Big Japan Pro Wrestling

- BJW Junior Heavyweight Championship (1 time)

- Battlarts

- Independent World Junior Heavyweight Championship (2 times)
