= Yoshihiro Tajiri =

Japanese professional wrestler, promoter and trainer (born 1970)

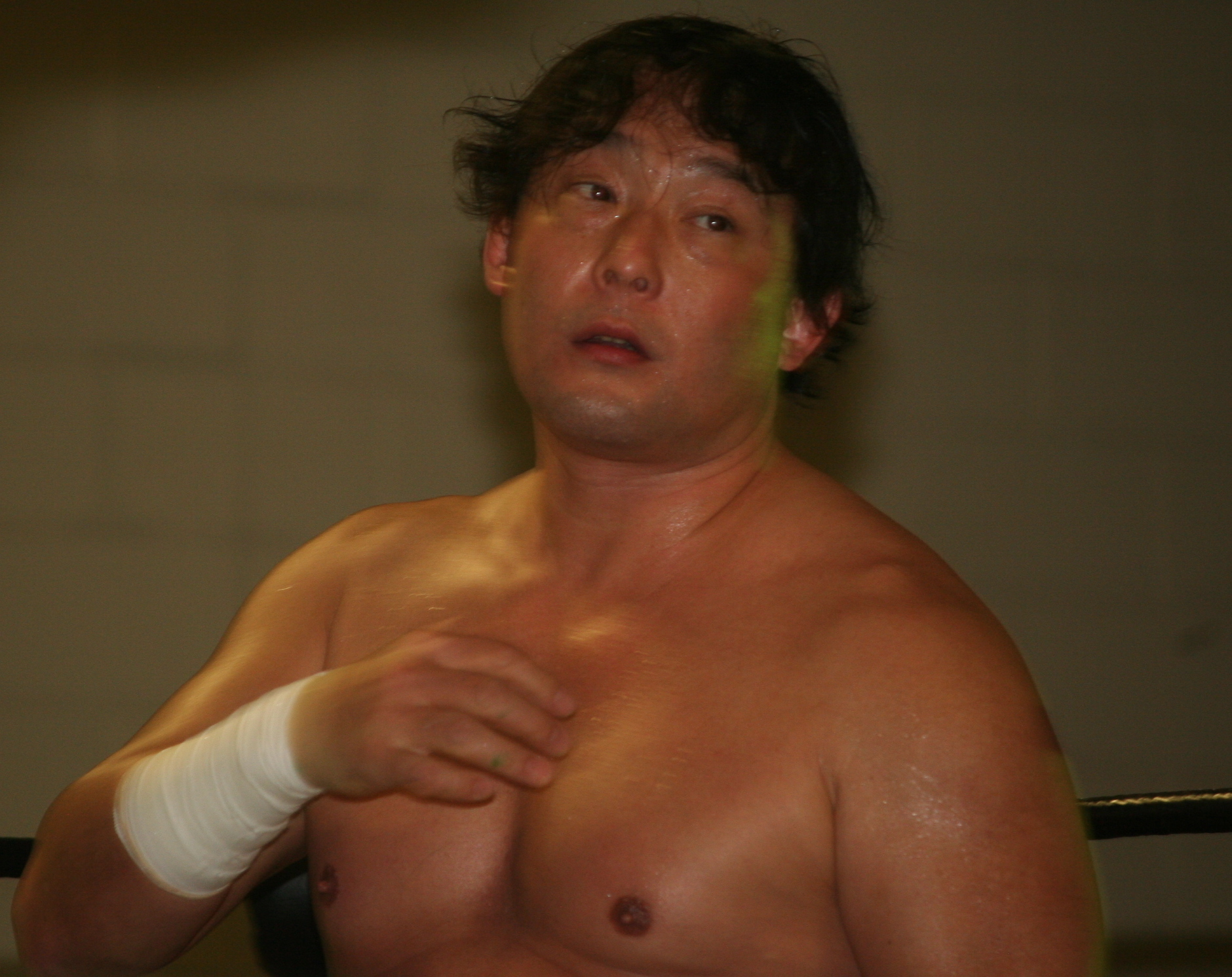
- Tajiri in 2018

Personal information
- Born: September 29, 1970 (age 56) Tamana, Kumamoto, Japan

Professional wrestling career
- Ring names: Aquarius; Kikkoman; Tajiri; Tajiri Claus; Tigre Blanco; Yoshihiro Tajiri
- Billed height: 175 cm (5 ft 9 in)
- Billed weight: 86 kg (190 lb)
- Billed from: Yokohama, Japan; Tokyo, Japan
- Trained by: Animal Hamaguchi; Kendo Nagasaki; Great Kojika; El Texano; Scottio Pieronio; Miguel Pérez; Silver King
- Debut: September 19, 1994

Yoshihiro Tajiri (田尻 義博, Tajiri Yoshihiro; born September 29, 1970) is a Japanese professional wrestler and promoter primarily known under the ring name Tajiri (sometimes stylized as "TAJIRI"), he has also competed under his real name as well as under the names Aquarius and Kikkoman and briefly worked as the masked character Tigre Blanco.

He rose to international attention through his work for Extreme Championship Wrestling (ECW) from 1998 to 2001 and World Wrestling Federation / World Wrestling Entertainment from 2001 to 2008 and a return in 2016–2017. Early in his career, he worked for several Mexican promotions such as Consejo Mundial de Lucha Libre (CMLL). After leaving WWE in 2005 he has worked for a number of Japanese promotions including New Japan Pro-Wrestling (NJPW), Hustle, Pro Wrestling Noah (Noah) and Wrestle-1 (W-1). He was also the promoter and featured wrestler for the Smash promotion as well as its successor Wrestling New Classic (WNC). He is currently under a full-time contract with Kyushu Pro-Wrestling.

Over the years Tajiri has trained various wrestlers including Kushida, Minoru Fujita, Ray and Syuri. In ECW he won the ECW World Television Championship and formed a regular tag team with Mikey Whipwreck that won the ECW World Tag Team Championship on one occasion. In CZW, he was a one time CZW World Heavyweight Champion. During his years with WWE, he won the WWF Light Heavyweight Championship once, WCW United States Championship once, their Cruiserweight Championship on multiple occasions, the WWE Tag Team Championship with Eddie Guerrero and the World Tag Team Championship with William Regal. In AJPW, he has won their Gaora TV Championship, World Junior Heavyweight Championship two times and the 2018 Jr. Tag Battle of Glory tournament with Koji Iwamoto. In MLW, he was MLW Middleweight Champion.

== Professional wrestling career ==
=== Early career (1994–1998) ===
Tajiri originally wanted to become a kickboxer and began training in the sport. However, after watching countless wrestling matches from Mexico, he entered the Animal Hamaguchi Wrestling gym and won its test match tournament. Tajiri debuted professionally in 1994 for International Wrestling Association of Japan (IWA Japan) with a loss to Takashi Okano. In 1996, Tajiri left CMLL to join the hardcore wrestling promotion Big Japan Pro Wrestling (BJW) in Tokyo, Japan. He debuted for BJW under the name Aquarius.

Tajiri joined Big Japan Pro Wrestling in 1995. On July 19, 1996, he defeated Dr. Wagner Jr. to win the CMLL World Light Heavyweight Championship but lost it to him on July 27. The championship changes were not approved by CMLL but done by Dr. Wagner Jr. and Aquarius as part of the tour. Since CMLL did not approve the championship reign they do not officially recognize Aquarius' championship reign, listing Dr. Wagner as one continuous reign during the time he toured Japan. On July 23, 1997, Tajiri teamed up with Ryuji Yamakawa to win the vacant BJW Tag Team Championship. They lost it to Gedo and Jado on December 22. The team would regain the titles eleven days later, before losing it to Shadow Winger and Shadow WX. Tajiri then beat Gedo to become the first BJW Junior Heavyweight Champion. He would later be stripped of the title when he left the company.

In 1996 and 1997, Tajiri made several appearances for the World Wrestling Federation (WWF) under the name Yoshihiro Tajiri as enhancement talent. His first match was teaming with Tim Patterson losing to The Godwinns on the episode of Monday Night Raw on April 22, 1996. On an episode of Monday Night Raw in July 1997, he lost to Taka Michinoku, whom the WWF was pushing as its rising star in the Light Heavyweight division at the time. Tajiri's final appearance was a tag match with Brian Christopher, losing to Scott Taylor and Michinoku on October 21. He would briefly work for CMLL in Mexico both in 1997 and 1998, before leaving in December 1998 to work for Extreme Championship Wrestling (ECW) full-time.

In 1997, Tajiri competed for New Japan Pro-Wrestling (NJPW), participating in the promotion's Best of the Super Juniors IV tournament as a guest from BJW. He won three matches but also lost three and did not advance from the first-round.

=== Extreme Championship Wrestling (1998–2001) ===
==== Beginnings and World Television Champion (1998–2000) ====
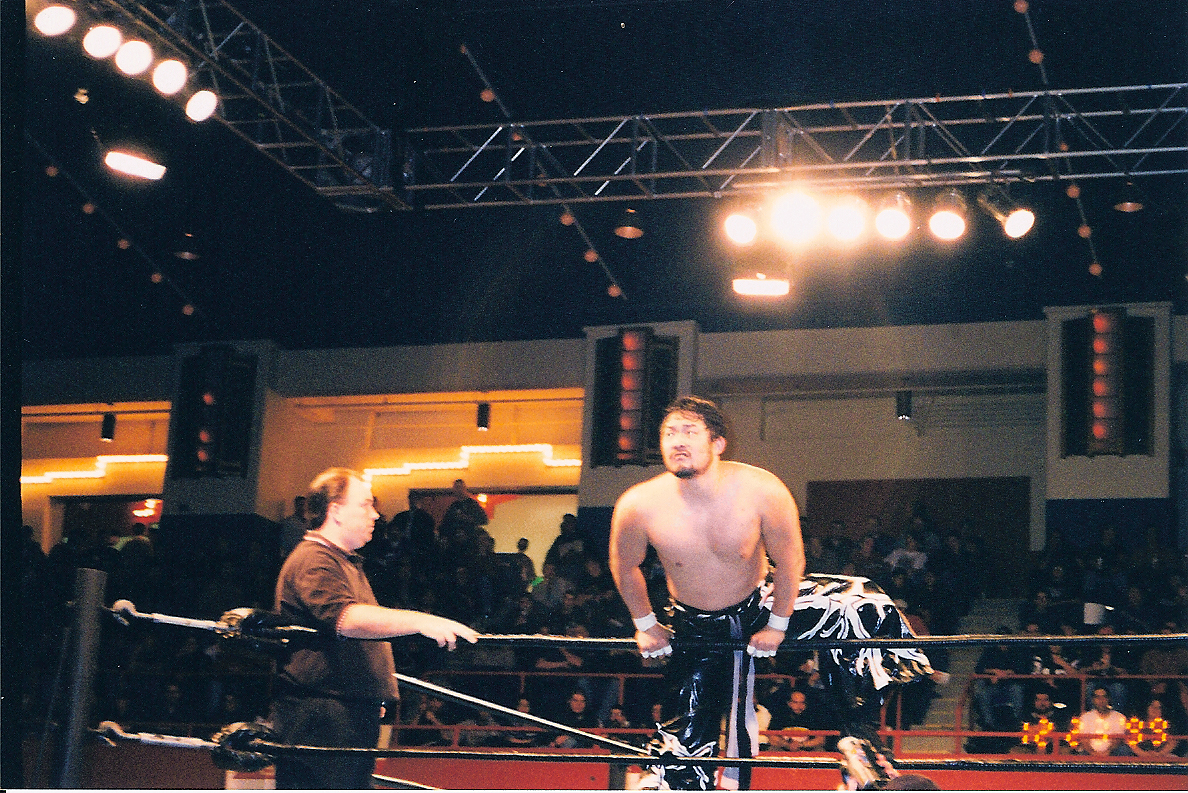
Tajiri in ECW in 1999

After working in Mexico, Tajiri was hired by Extreme Championship Wrestling (ECW) based out of Philadelphia, Pennsylvania. He made his television debut in ECW on the December 24, 1998, episode of Hardcore TV, clad in traditional blue and white trunks with an insignia of Japan's rising sun, and picked up a victory over Antifaz Del Norte. He began a notable storyline rivalry with Super Crazy. The duo traded wins throughout 1999. His other notable single feuds included Little Guido and Jerry Lynn.

In early 1999, Tajiri began to emulate The Great Muta, who was one of Tajiri's wrestling heroes growing up. His wrestling trunks were replaced with baggy Karate gi pants, and he began spraying green mist into the face of his opponents. He aligned himself with Steve Corino, who promised to teach him the American way and help him to integrate himself into United States culture. With Tajiri's notoriety increasing, he received an ECW World Heavyweight Championship title shot against Taz at Heat Wave, and on an episode on ECW on TNN but failed to capture the title on both occasions. In 2000, he earned another shot at the championship against Justin Credible but lost once again.

In early 2000, Tajiri was recruited by Cyrus to join The Network group along with Steve Corino. During this time, Tajiri went up against Super Crazy for the ECW World Television Championship in a Japanese death match, a match with no disqualification and all weapons are legal. He lost but gained the title back in a three way dance involving Super Crazy and Little Guido. Shortly after becoming champion, Tajiri was asked by Cyrus to relinquish the belt to The Network so they could award the title to Rhino. Tajiri refused to turn the belt over and turned his back on the Network, becoming a babyface in the process. His first defense of the title ended in a no contest with Tommy Dreamer. Tajiri lost the title to Rhino on April 22. His rematch came on May 6, but he was unable to regain the title.

==== Unholy Alliance (2000–2001) ====
Tajiri would then form a tag team with Mikey Whipwreck, known as the Unholy Alliance, who were managed by The Sinister Minister. They entered the World Tag Team tournament and won the vacant ECW World Tag Team Championship in August 2000 at Midtown Massacre. The team then started feuding with The Full Blooded Italians and lost the World Tag Team Championship to them only a day after they first won them. They failed to recapture them at Anarchy Rulz and again at November to Remember.

Shortly after his alliance with Whipwreck, Tajiri's amusing antics in the ring, stiff contact with opponents, and comedic backstage vignettes made him one of the most popular wrestlers in ECW. Tajiri remained loyal to the company until it folded in April 2001. He participated in ECW's final two shows: on January 12, where he picked up a victory over Super Crazy, and January 13, 2001, when he lost to Super Crazy.

=== Independent circuit (2000–2001) ===
With ECW's television deal being canceled in October 2000, the company had to make massive cuts. This resulted in Tajiri wrestling for the company for lower wages and led to him wrestling more frequently on the American and Mexican independent circuit. In IWA Puerto Rico, Tajiri teamed with Super Crazy as they unsuccessfully wrestled Andy Anderson and Vyzago for the World Tag Team Championship. He would also enter the Hardcore Championship invitational match but lost.

During this period, Tajiri had multiple CZW World Heavyweight Championship matches in the Combat Zone Wrestling (CZW) promotion. His first would be against Justice Pain. Tajiri lost to Pain twice but would later go on to beat Nick Berk to become CZW World Heavyweight Champion on February 28, 2001; however, Tajiri lost the title that same night to Zandig.

=== World Wrestling Federation / World Wrestling Entertainment (2001–2006, 2008) ===
==== Championship reigns (2001–2004) ====
Soon after the closure of ECW, Tajiri was hired by the World Wrestling Federation (WWF). Tajiri debuted on the May 24, 2001, episode of SmackDown! as a face. He was given the gimmick of WWF Commissioner William Regal's comedic assistant. With the help of Regal, Tajiri made his in-ring debut defeating Crash in a King of the Ring qualifying match on the June 14 episode of SmackDown!. He was later eliminated by Rhyno on the June 18 episode of Raw. Tajiri would win his first championship in WWF by defeating X-Pac for the WWF Light Heavyweight Championship on the August 6 episode of Raw. X-Pac would quickly capture the WCW Cruiserweight Championship, and at SummerSlam on August 19, Tajiri would lose a championship unification match, therefore retiring the Light Heavyweight Championship. Tajiri would quickly bounce back as he began an on-screen relationship with Torrie Wilson and defeated Chris Kanyon for the WCW United States Championship on the September 10 episode of Raw. However, Tajiri would lose the belt to Rhyno soon afterward at Unforgiven on September 23. After Regal turned heel by joining The Alliance, Tajiri feuded with him throughout late 2001.

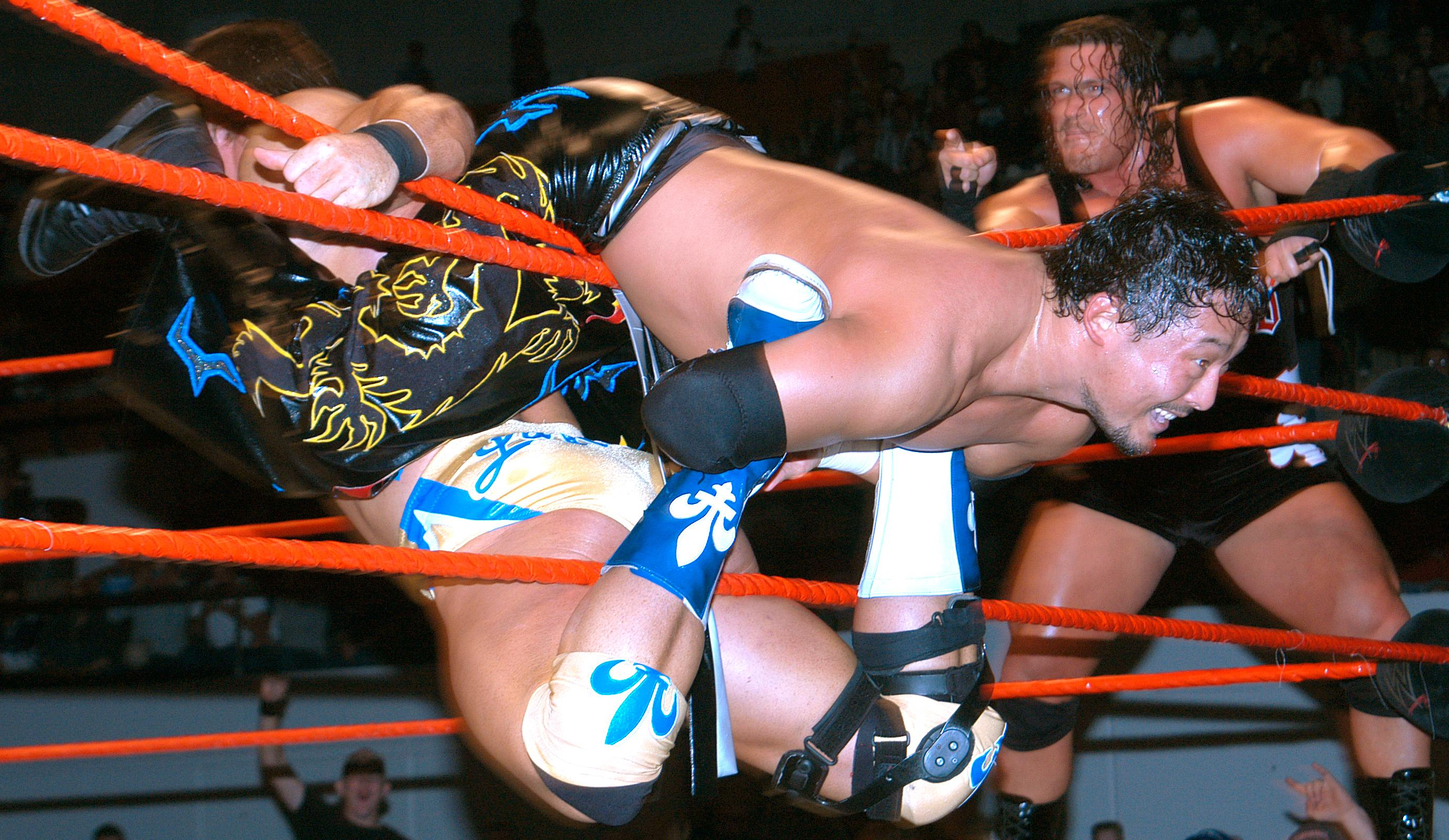
Yoshihiro Tajiri performs the Tarantula on Robért Conway.

Tajiri won the WCW Cruiserweight Championship on the October 22 episode of Raw. The title became the WWF Cruiserweight Championship and replaced the WWF Light Heavyweight Championship when the WWF defeated The Alliance at Survivor Series on November 18. The WWF was renamed World Wrestling Entertainment, and the roster was divided into two "brands": Raw and SmackDown!. Tajiri, along with Torrie Wilson, was drafted to SmackDown!, therefore making the Cruiserweight Championship a SmackDown! exclusive title. Tajiri went on to lose the title to Billy Kidman on the April 4, 2002 episode on SmackDown!. He would go on to beat Kidman at Backlash on April 21 once again and won the Cruiserweight Championship again only 17 days after losing it.

He turned heel by forcing Wilson to dress like a geisha against her will. Tajiri would go on to lose the Cruiserweight Championship to The Hurricane on the May 16 episode of SmackDown! in a triple threat match that also included Billy Kidman. Wilson eventually abandoned him during a Cruiserweight Championship match against The Hurricane; she did so by stripping on top of a table during the match that caused Tajiri to be counted out and later joined forces with Tajiri's rival, Maven. Tajiri became a face in WWE once more after Jamie Noble attacked him for touching Noble's girlfriend Nidia. This led to several Cruiserweight Championship matches between the two including matches at No Mercy on October 20 and Rebellion on October 26. He also participated in his first Royal Rumble match on January 19, 2003.

Tajiri would leave the Cruiserweight division and moved to the tag team division where he formed various tag teams, many of which were somewhat comical. These included Rey Mysterio, Funaki, and Rikishi. Five days prior to the 2003 Judgment Day show, Chavo Guerrero tore his biceps, forcing Eddie Guerrero to look for another partner. He chose Tajiri. They won the WWE Tag Team Championship, at Judgment Day on May 18 by defeating Team Angle (Charlie Haas and Shelton Benjamin) in a ladder match. The following week, Guerrero and Tajiri managed to retain their title by cheating. In addition, they also defeated Roddy Piper and his protégé Sean O'Haire at Madison Square Garden. After Guerrero and Tajiri lost the titles to The World's Greatest Tag Team (formerly Team Angle) on the July 3 episode of SmackDown!, Guerrero turned on Tajiri, slamming him through the windshield of his lowrider truck. On the next SmackDown!, Guerrero explained that this was because, during the match, Tajiri had accidentally hit his lowrider. At SummerSlam on August 24, Tajiri competed in a Fatal four-way match for the WWE United States Championship but failed to win the title.

Tajiri would mark his return to the cruiserweight division by taking on the champion Rey Mysterio and after losing he spat green mist in Mysterio's eye, turning him heel once again. On the September 25 episode of SmackDown!, Tajiri would beat Rey Mysterio for the WWE Cruiserweight Championship which would be his third and last reign. Tajiri would successfully defend the championship in Mysterio's rematch at No Mercy on October 19 after Akio and Sakoda, later known as "Kyo Dai" (the word kyodai meaning "brothers"), interfered in the match. Tajiri would, however, lose the championship after 93 days to Mysterio on the January 1, 2004, episode of SmackDown!. Tajiri kept his heel persona going by spitting black mist in Nidia's eyes and "blinding" her (Nidia and Noble were both faces by this time.) Noble and Tajiri started a new feud, which quickly ended after Noble betrayed his blind girlfriend and turned heel again. Kyo Dai would quickly be separated from Tajiri and eventually split up after Tajiri refused the WWE writers proposal of Kyo Dai portraying Japanese gangsters. Tajiri feared that it might anger the real Japanese yakuza if they saw the gimmick as an insult. At WrestleMania XX on March 14, Tajiri took part in a cruiserweight open for the Cruiserweight Championship which was won by the reigning champion Chavo Guerrero.

==== Various storylines (2004–2008) ====
In 2004, Tajiri had two chances to earn a shot at the WWE Championship. The first chance was in the 2004 Royal Rumble, where the winner would get a championship match at WrestleMania XX, but he was eliminated by Rhyno. His second chance was in a battle royal on SmackDown!, in which the winner would face then-champion Brock Lesnar at No Way Out. However, he lost once again when he was eliminated by the Big Show.

Following WrestleMania XX, Tajiri was drafted to Raw, where he turned face once again and feuded with the group of Eric Bischoff, Jonathan Coachman, and Garrison Cade. He would later feud with the Evolution stable for a good portion of 2004. Also that year, Tajiri formed a tag team with Rhyno. This team dissolved quietly after a failed attempt at winning the World Tag Team Championship from La Résistance at Unforgiven. On February 4, 2005, in Saitama Super Arena, Tajiri reunited with William Regal to defeat La Résistance for the World Tag Team Championship on an episode of Raw emanating from Japan. After several defenses against La Résistance, among others, their reign ended on May 1 at Backlash, when they were eliminated from a tag team turmoil match by La Résistance.

Tajiri lost a three way dance (that also featured Little Guido) to Super Crazy at ECW One Night Stand 2005 on June 12. Later that year, he formed a short-lived team with Eugene. In December 2005, Tajiri left WWE, stating that he wanted to try to become a journalist and spend more time with his wife and family in Japan. His final televised WWE match was a loss to Gregory Helms on Heat. After the match, he received a standing ovation as a farewell.

Tajiri returned for a one-night appearance at WWE's ECW One Night Stand 2006 pay-per-view, teaming with Super Crazy to lose to the Full Blooded Italians.

On February 12, 2008, Tajiri made an appearance at a WWE house show in Tokyo, where he accompanied William Regal to the ring for a match against Ric Flair, which Regal lost.

=== Hustle (2006–2010) ===
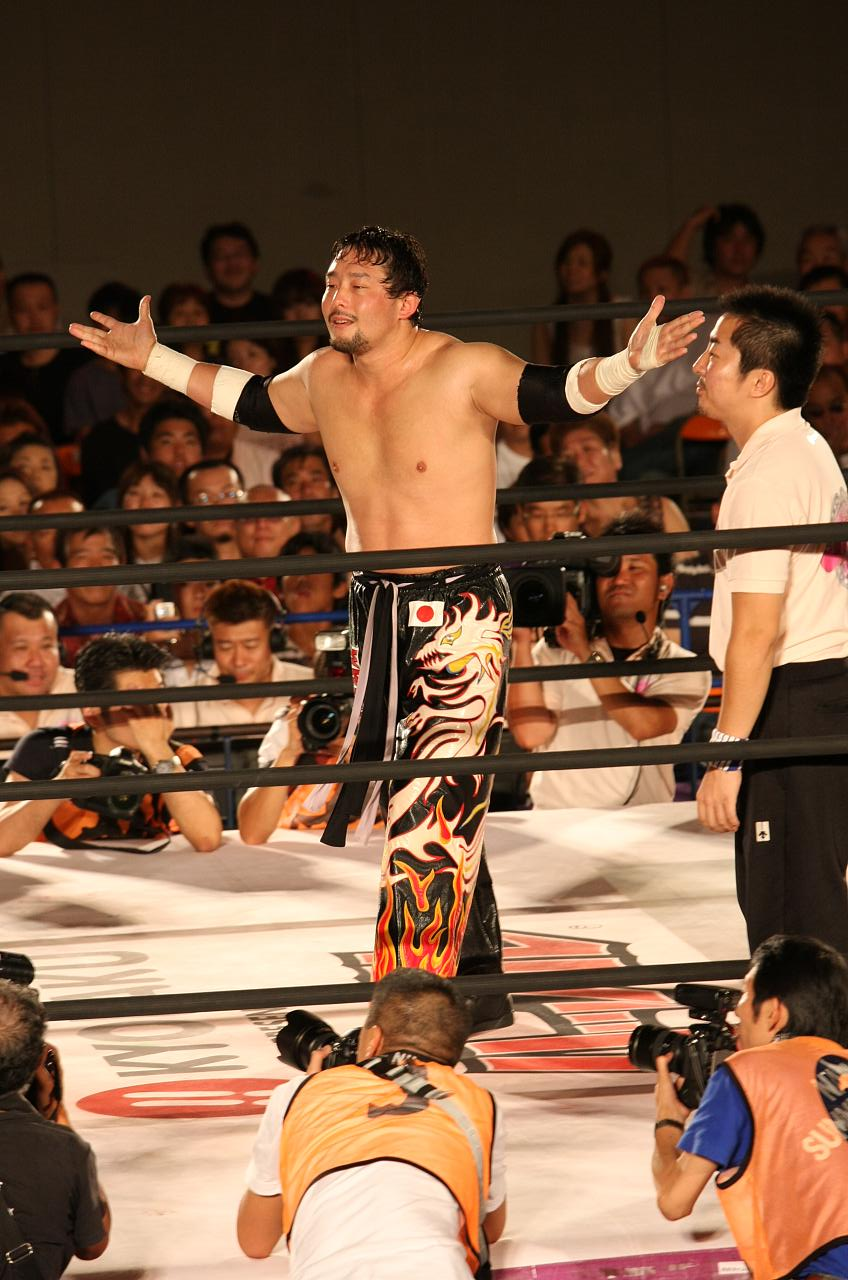
Tajiri wrestling in Hustle

Tajiri's return to Japan came at Hustle on March 5, 2006, defeating Kohei Sato, The Monster PTA and Yoji Anjo with Razor Ramon Hard Gay and Shinjiro Otani. In the Hustle promotion, he was originally aligned with the babyface Hustle Army, a group which defends the sport of professional wrestling against the Monster Army (led by Monster General and Monster K, who aim to destroy the sport). However, he was hypnotized by Yinling into joining the Monster Army. In 2006, Tajiri took Yujiro Kushida under his wing and trained him while at Hustle. They participated in multiple tag team matches and tag team tournaments, and they also had several matches against one another. He also participated in Hustle GP, Hustle's only tournament, but was knocked out of the tournaments in the first round by Wataru Sakata. In his last appearance at Hustle, Tajiri defeated Muscle Sakai in a two out of three falls match which Tajiri won two to one.

=== All Japan Pro Wrestling (2006–2007, 2011) ===
Tajiri made his debut for All Japan Pro Wrestling, losing to The Great Muta; Tajiri and Muta would team up for a few matches, the most notable of which was against Kaz Hayashi and Satoshi Kojima when the pair used double Asian mist to achieve victory.

Tajiri was a title contender in All Japan Pro Wrestling throughout 2007, including a feud with Triple Crown Heavyweight Champion Minoru Suzuki. This feud started on March 30, 2007, at the final Champion Carnival 2007 event, following Tajiri's victory over Suzuki via count-out when Tajiri tied Suzuki's foot to the guardrail and went on to steal the Triple Crown championship belts following the match. Because of Tajiri's refusal to return the titles, Suzuki created paper belts to temporarily represent his championship. Tajiri opposed Suzuki again on April 22, 2007, in a tag team match, in which Tajiri taunted Suzuki repeatedly. At the conclusion of the match, Suzuki (after losing the match because of the Tarantula) chased Tajiri around the Korakuen Hall, only for Tajiri to jump the guard rail and steal the paper belts. Days later, Tajiri returned the titles in exchange for a title match on April 30, 2007, where he was unsuccessful. Tajiri also teamed with The Great Muta to defeat Kohei Suwama and Scott Steiner.

Tajiri returned to All Japan Pro Wrestling in 2011 to team up with Great Muta and Kenso in a loss to Partisan Forces (Masakatsu Funaki and Minoru Suzuki) and KAI. Tajiri would then bring Smash's biggest stars to AJPW for a one-night event where he and his partners Akira and StarBuck defeated Bushi, Keiji Muto, and Shuji Kondo.

=== New Japan Pro-Wrestling (2009–2011) ===
During the summer of 2009, Tajiri invaded NJPW, where he started a feud with the International Wrestling Gran Prix (IWGP) Heavyweight Champion Hiroshi Tanahashi, by attacking and green misting him after his title defense against Takashi Sugiura. Tajiri participated in G1 Climax 2009 and won his first match of the tournament and his first match of his return.

On August 13, Tajiri pinned the IWGP Heavyweight Champion in a non-title match during the G1 Climax tournament, after using the green mist. Tajiri ended the tournament with only four points, finishing bottom of block A. Hustle folded in October 2009, after which Tajiri began wrestling for NJPW full-time. He would score two more pinfall victories over the now former IWGP Heavyweight Champion in multiple man tag team matches, but in the end lost the feud, when Tanahashi pinned him cleanly in a one-on-one match on December 5. Afterwards, Tajiri set his sights on Seigigun, led by Yuji Nagata. On January 4, 2010, at Wrestle Kingdom IV in Tokyo Dome Tajiri teamed up with fellow ECW alumnus Masato Tanaka and together they defeated the Seigigun team of Nagata and Akebono when Tajiri pinned Nagata after the green mist and a Buzzsaw kick. On February 14 Nagata defeated Tajiri in a one-on-one match in under five minutes to seemingly end the feud and Tajiri's run with the company.

On June 19 at Dominion 6.19, Tajiri returned to New Japan, turning face and saving former rival Hiroshi Tanahashi from Toru Yano and Takashi Iizuka. He then helped Tanahashi shave Yano's head following their Hair vs. Hair match. On June 28 Tajiri, Tanahashi, and Kushida entered the J Sports Crown Openweight 6 Man Tag Tournament, where they made it all the way to the finals on June 30, before being defeated by Prince Devitt, Ryusuke Taguchi, and Hirooki Goto. In October and November 2010, Tajiri teamed with Tanahashi in New Japan's 2010 G1 Tag League. After a strong start in the tournament, Tajiri and Tanahashi were defeated by the IWGP Tag Team Champions Bad Intentions (Giant Bernard and Karl Anderson) on November 6, the last day of group stages, and slipped to third place in their block, narrowly missing the semifinals of the tournament.

=== Smash (2010–2012) ===
In 2010, Tajiri was placed in charge of Smash, a new promotion taking the place of Hustle. The promotion held its first show on March 26 which saw Tajiri wrestle two matches in one night. The first was a hardcore match against Tommy Dreamer. Tajiri lost to Dreamer but then beat Mentallo in his second contest. Later that same night, Tajiri and Dreamer saved Kushida from Leatherface. To end the show, Dreamer paid tribute to Tajiri which led him to break into tears.

During 2010, Tajiri, along with other Smash talent made crossover appearances in Finnish promotion Fight Club Finland (FCF). At Smash.3 on May 29, 2010, Tajiri defeated Valentine to win the FCF Finnish Heavyweight Championship for the first time. He would drop the title to StarBuck on July 24 at Smash.6, before regaining it from him on November 22, 2010, at Smash.10. On February 25, 2011, Tajiri gave Kushida his blessing to leave Smash and become a full-time member of the New Japan roster on April 1. At Smash.12 Tajiri would successfully defend his title against Super Crazy but would lose the title later on in the night to Michael Kovac at Smash.13, at Smash.13. On September 8 at Smash.21, Tajiri defeated Akira in the semifinals of the Smash Championship tournament. On October 28, Tajiri was defeated in the finals of the tournament by StarBuck.

On February 10, 2012, Smash announced that the promotion would be folding after its March 14 event, following a disagreement between Tajiri and financial backer Masakazu Sakai. On February 19 at Smash.25, Tajiri unsuccessfully challenged Dave Finlay for the Smash Championship. On March 14, Tajiri wrestled in Smash's final match, where he and AKIRA defeated Hajime Ohara and StarBuck. Following the match, Tajiri announced his intention of starting a new promotion.

=== Wrestling New Classic (2012–2014) ===
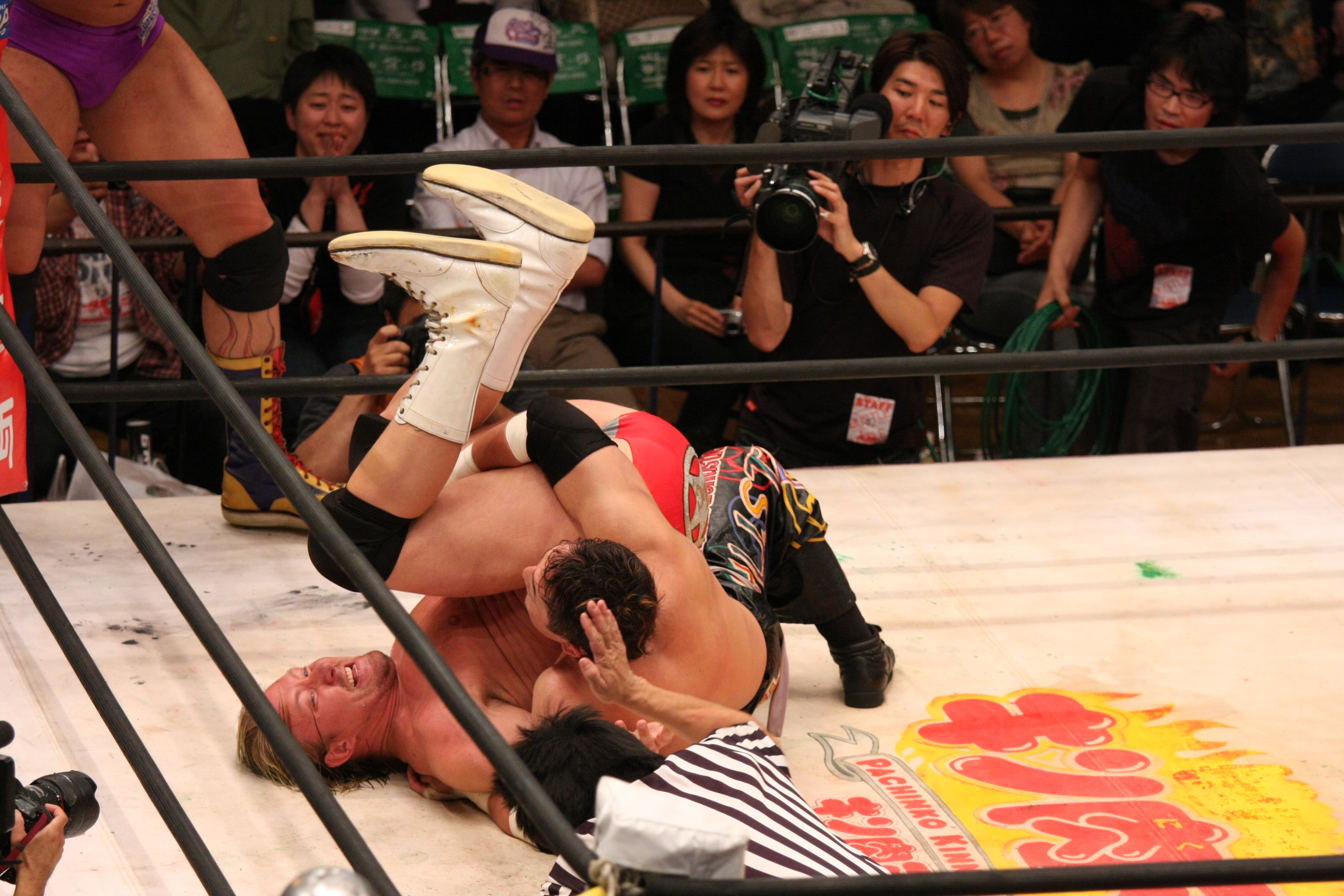
Tajiri performing a roll-up on Lance Cade

On April 5, 2012, Tajiri announced the follow-up promotion to Smash, Wrestling New Classic (WNC), which would hold its first event on April 26. On April 26, Tajiri was defeated by Akira in the main event of WNC's first event. For WNC's second event on May 24, Tajiri reunited with former ECW tag team partner, Mikey Whipwreck, to defeat Gedo and Jado in a hardcore tag team match. Two days later, Tajiri and Whipwreck defeated Yo-Hey and Yusuke Kodama in another hardcore tag team match. On June 22, Tajiri's longtime partner Akira turned on him and, the following month formed a new alliance with StarBuck and Syuri.

Tajiri, Hajime Ohara, and Kana, the former partners of the three formed an alliance of their own to battle the three, but were on August 2 defeated in the first match between the two groups. Following the match, Ohara also turned on Tajiri and WNC, forming a new partnership with debuting female wrestler Nagisa Nozaki. On August 30, Tajiri teamed with Kana and the returning Mikey Whipwreck in a Barbed Wire Board Deathmatch, where they were defeated by Akira, StarBuck and Syuri. In a September 1 match, Whipwreck pinned StarBuck for the win, ending the villainous trio's win streak in the process. On September 20, Tajiri defeated Syuri in an intergender match at Korakuen Hall.

On October 26, Tajiri entered the WNC Championship tournament, defeating Carlito in his first-round match. On November 28, Tajiri defeated Hajime Ohara to advance to the finals of the tournament. On December 27, Tajiri was defeated in the finals of the tournament by Akira. On August 8, 2013, Tajiri defeated Osamu Nishimura in his home prefecture of Kumamoto to become the third WNC Champion. After five successful title defenses, Tajiri lost the title to StarBuck on February 27, 2014.

On June 18, 2014, Tajiri announced that WNC would be going inactive following June 26. Effective July 1, six former WNC wrestlers, Tajiri included, transferred over to the Wrestle-1 promotion.

=== Wrestle-1 (2014–2016) ===
Tajiri wrestled his first match under a Wrestle-1 contract on July 6, 2014, teaming with Yusuke Kodama in a tag team match, where they defeated the Total Nonstop Action Wrestling (TNA) team of Ethan Carter III and Rockstar Spud. On September 22, Tajiri entered the Wrestle-1 Championship tournament but was defeated in his first-round match by Masakatsu Funaki. Tajiri then entered a storyline, where he began helping Funaki train for his semifinal match in the tournament. However, on October 8, Tajiri turned on Funaki, costing him his semifinal match against Masayuki Kono. Post-match, Tajiri was announced as the newest member of Kono's villainous Desperado stable.

In November, Tajiri and Masayuki Kono took part in the First Tag League Greatest tournament, set to determine the inaugural Wrestle-1 Tag Team Champions, where they won their block with a clean record of four wins and zero losses, advancing to the semifinals. On November 30, Tajiri and Kono were eliminated from the tournament in the semifinals by Akira and Manabu Soya.

On May 16, 2015, Tajiri defeated Minoru Tanaka at a Wrestle-1 event to capture the European Wrestling Promotion (EWP) Intercontinental Championship. A week later, Tajiri unsuccessfully challenged Tanaka for the Wrestle-1 Cruiser Division Championship. On May 30, Tajiri lost the EWP Intercontinental Championship back to Tanaka in a Title vs. Title match also contested for the Wrestle-1 Cruiser Division Championship. Following the match, Desperado turned on Tajiri and kicked him out of the stable. On June 19, Wrestle-1 announced a new contractual status for Tajiri, which would see him work only sporadic Wrestle-1 events from July onwards due to looking for a new career as an acupuncturist abroad. On January 31, 2016, Tajiri, Kaz Hayashi and Minoru Tanaka won the vacant UWA World Trios Championship.

On June 28, 2016, Tajiri announced he was leaving Wrestle-1 due to his contract with the company expiring. On July 29, Tajiri, Hayashi, and Tanaka lost the UWA World Trios Championship to Andy Wu, Daiki Inaba and Seiki Yoshioka in their fifth defense.

=== Total Nonstop Action Wrestling (2014) ===
Tajiri debuted at the August Impact Wrestling tapings in New York City, defeating Robbie E on August 5 (aired September 24), and working matches on the August tapings; Tajiri and Austin Aries lost to James Storm and Sanada and then on the September 24 episode of Impact Wrestling, he competed in the NYC Gold Rush Final fatal five-way match which also included Abyss, Mr. Anderson, MVP and Austin Aries with Anderson winning the match. His final appearance for the promotion was at the October 12, Bound for Glory pay-per-view event in Tokyo, teaming with The Great Muta in a tag team main event, where they defeated James Storm and The Great Sanada.

=== Second return to WWE (2016–2017) ===
On June 13, 2016, Tajiri was announced as a participant in WWE's Cruiserweight Classic tournament. The tournament kicked off on June 23 with Tajiri defeating Damian Slater in his first-round match. On July 14, Tajiri was eliminated from the tournament by Gran Metalik.

On December 3, at the NXT special at Osaka, Japan, Tajiri teamed with Akira Tozawa, losing to NXT Tag Team Champions DIY (Tommaso Ciampa and Johnny Gargano). On December 4, 2016, Tajiri announced he signed a full-time contract with WWE, and that he would make his return in early 2017. On the December 13 episode of 205 Live, vignettes for Tajiri's return began airing. On January 3, 2017, Tajiri debuted on 205 Live defeating Sean Maluta. Following the match, The Brian Kendrick tried to welcome him back to the WWE, only for Tajiri to spit green mist onto his face. In January, Tajiri suffered a knee injury at an NXT taping. After weeks of recovery, Tajiri returned at a 205 Live taping in February, following a match between Lince Dorado and Brian Kendrick. On April 22, Tajiri officially announced his departure from the WWE. According to him, he had been medically cleared to return and compete from a knee injury, but WWE decided not to use him due to his age.

=== Return to AJPW (2017–2022) ===
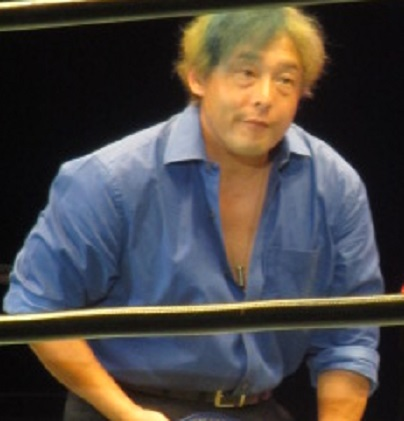
Tajiri in 2017

Following his departure from WWE, Tajiri returned to Japan, with All Japan announcing his first post-WWE booking for June 11. On July 30, Tajiri defeated Hikaru Sato to win the promotion's World Junior Heavyweight Championship. He lost the title to Último Dragón on August 27, before regaining it on October 21. His reign as Junior Heavyweight Champion lasted until February 3, 2018, when Atsushi Aoki won the championship from Tajiri. Tajiri defeated Jun Akiyama on July 15, 2018, to win the Gaora TV Championship. AJPW further pushed Tajiri as he and tag team partner Koji Iwamoto were entered into the 2018 Jr. Tag Battle of Glory tournament. The duo won four of the six first-round matches, then defeated Atsushi Aoki and Hikaru Sato in the finals to win the tournament.

=== Major League Wrestling (2021–2022) ===
On October 2, 2021, Tajiri made his MLW debut at Fightland where he defeated Myron Reed, Arez, and Aramis to become the new MLW World Middleweight Champion. Tajiri will defend the MLW World Middleweight Championship in England at Cheltenham Town Hall February 19 when he will face Jody Fleisch on a card promoted by World Pro Wrestling. He would lose the title in January 2022 against Myron Reed.

=== Kyushu Pro-Wrestling (2023–present) ===
On January 3, 2023, Tajiri made his Kyushu Pro-Wrestling debut at Jokyo 2023 where he defeated Kodai Nozaki to win the Kyushu Pro-Wrestling Championship, then announced he had signed full-time with the promotion. He lost the title to Mentai☆Kid, on February 5, at the Kitakyushu Genki Festival event.

== Professional wrestling persona and style ==
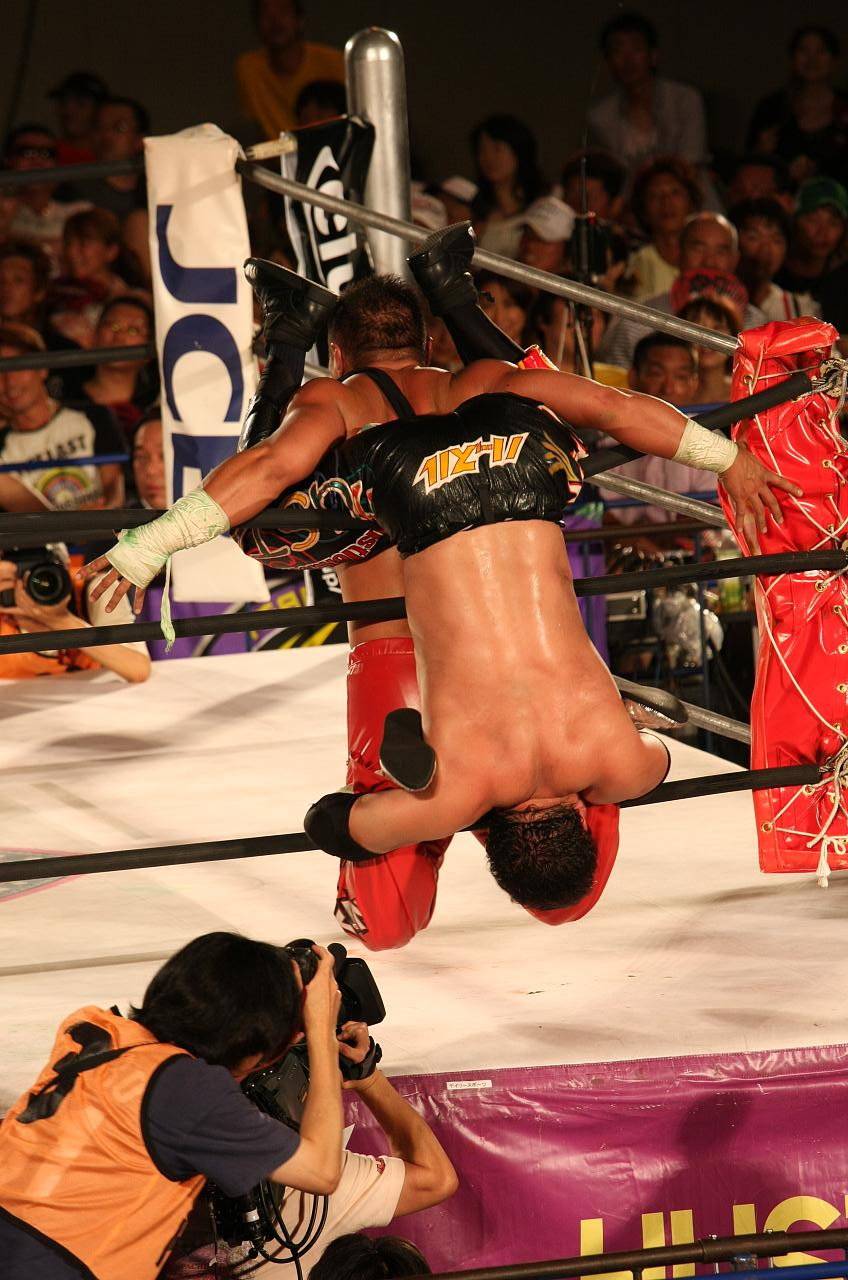
Tajiri performing the Tarantula on Wataru Sakata

Originally Tajiri performed as a face, without much ring character as such on display, until joining ECW where he adopted his heel "Japanese Buzzsaw" ring character. As the "Japanese Buzzsaw" Tajiri began to display a more ruthless, deranged persona, focusing more on inflicting pain on his opponents than winning matches, which included creating the Tarantula submission hold. The Tarantula is a Rope-hung Boston crab, where Tajiri himself is hung upside down over the top rope as he applies the hold. Since the move involves the use of the ring ropes, it is technically an illegal hold, and must be broken before a referee's count of 5 or risk disqualification. Since a submission from this position is not valid, it is a symbol of the "Sadism" that his "Japanese Buzzsaw" character displays. When Tajiri transitioned to the heel character in 1998 he began wearing baggy pants, using the heavy pants to hide just how much contact his foot actually has with an opponent's chest when Tajiri performs a "Buzzsaw Kick" (a high-speed roundhouse kick to the head) on an opponent that often finishes his matches. As part of the deranged Buzzsaw persona, Tajiri began using "Asian mist" during his matches, spraying a mist of water and green food coloring in the face of an opponent who sells the mist as being blinding. The mist was one of the signature moves of the Great Muta, Tajiri's wrestling inspiration and adopted by Tajiri in the late 1990s and has been a trademark move ever since. When working as a heel the mist usually draws a strong negative reaction, but when he's a face it draws a positive reaction from the crowd when he uses it as payback on a heel during a match. During his partnership with William Regal, the face Tajiri portrayed a more comedic version of the Buzzsaw character, often either disgusting or disturbing Regal with his antics.

== In other media ==
In December 2003, Tajiri released his autobiography, Tajiri: The Japanese Buzzsaw, in Japan. The book chronicles his wrestling career, from the Mexican and Japanese circuits to ECW and WWF/WWE. Written entirely in Japanese, it was the first book published by WWE in a non-English language.

== Wrestlers trained ==
Over the years Tajiri has been involved in training several wrestlers, both male and female, especially after his return to Japan in 2005. These include:

- Hiroki Murase
- Jiro Kuroshio
- Josh O'Brien
- Kaho Kobayashi
- Koharu Hinata
- Koji Doi
- Kushida
- Lin Byron
- Makoto
- Masaya Takahashi
- Minoru Fujita
- Mitoshichi Shinose
- Rionne Fujiwara
- Syuri
- Yoshihiro Horaguchi
- Yusuke Kodama

== Championships and accomplishments ==
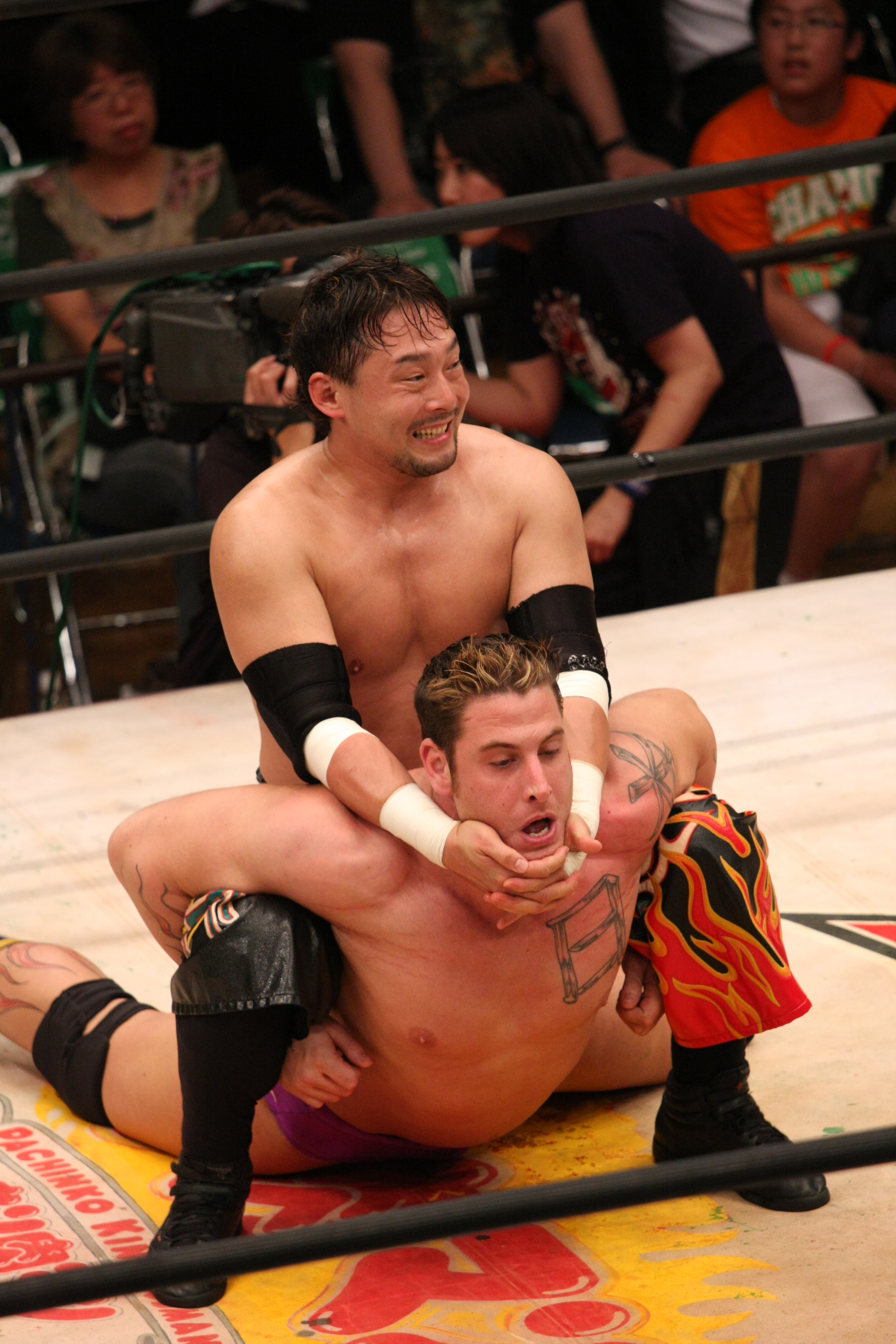
Tajiri performing a camel clutch on René Duprée

- All Japan Pro Wrestling
  - Gaora TV Championship (1 time)
  - AJPW TV Six-Man Tag Team Championship (1 time) – with Yusuke Kodama & Hokuto Omori
  - All Asia Tag Team Championship (1 time) – with Yoshitatsu
  - World Junior Heavyweight Championship (2 times)
  - Jr. Tag Battle of Glory (2018) – with Koji Iwamoto
- Big Japan Pro Wrestling
  - BJW Junior Heavyweight Championship (original version) (1 time)
  - BJW Junior Heavyweight Championship (1 time)
  - BJW Tag Team Championship (2 times) – with Ryuji Yamakawa
- Combat Zone Wrestling
  - CZW World Heavyweight Championship (1 time)
- Consejo Mundial de Lucha Libre
  - CMLL World Light Heavyweight Championship (1 time) (Note: The championship reign was not officially recognized by CMLL.)
- European Wrestling Association
  - EWA Intercontinental Championship (1 time)
- Extreme Championship Wrestling
  - ECW World Television Championship (1 time)
  - ECW World Tag Team Championship (1 time) – with Mikey Whipwreck
- Fight Club Finland
  - FCF Finnish Heavyweight Championship (2 times)
- International Wrestling Association
  - IWA Hardcore Championship (1 time)
- Kyushu Pro-Wrestling
  - Kyushu Pro-Wrestling Championship (1 time)
  - Kyushu Pro-Wrestling Tag Team Championship (2 times) – with Shiho (1) and Yuji Nagata (1)
- Major League Wrestling
  - MLW World Middleweight Championship (1 times)
- Pro Wrestling Illustrated
  - Ranked No. 23 of the 500 best singles wrestlers of the PWI 500 in 2002
  - Ranked No. 242 of the top 500 singles wrestlers of the PWI Years in 2003
- Pro Wrestling Malta
  - PWM Heavyweight Championship (1 time)
- Pro Wrestling Society
  - PWS Championship (2 times)
- European Wrestling Promotion
  - EWP Intercontinental Championship (1 time)
- Tokyo Sports
  - Special Award (2001)
- World Wrestling Federation / World Wrestling Entertainment
  - WCW United States Championship (1 time) (Note: Tajiri won the championship during The Invasion storyline.)
  - WWF Light Heavyweight Championship (1 time)
  - WCW/WWF/WWE Cruiserweight Championship (3 times)
  - WWE Tag Team Championship (1 time) – with Eddie Guerrero
  - World Tag Team Championship (1 time) – with William Regal
- Wrestle-1
  - UWA World Trios Championship (1 time) – with Kaz Hayashi and Minoru Tanaka
- Wrestling New Classic
  - WNC Championship (1 time)

== Luchas de Apuestas record ==
Winner (wager)	Loser (wager)	Location	Event	Date	Notes
Ringo Mendoza and Tajiri (hair)	Chicago Express and Moghur (hair)	Mexico City, Distrito Federal	CMLL Domingos de Coliseo	June 14, 1998	
