= Michinoku Pro Wrestling =

Japanese professional wrestling promotion

- Acronym: MPW; M-Pro
- Founded: October 1, 1992
- Style: Lucha libre
- Headquarters: Morioka, Iwate, Japan
- Founder: The Great Sasuke
- Owner: Jinsei Shinzaki
- Split from: Universal Lucha Libre
- Website: michipro.jp

Michinoku Pro Wrestling (みちのくプロレス, Michinoku puroresu) (originally known as North Eastern Wrestling) is a Japanese professional wrestling promotion founded by The Great Sasuke on October 1, 1992. It was the first independent wrestling promotion in Japan to not base its operations in Tokyo, but rather in Morioka, Iwate. Since the promotion is primarily focused on the Lucha libre style of wrestling, many of their wrestlers don masks and special motifs as they compete in the ring. However, Michinoku Pro has accepted wrestlers from various styles (such as shoot style and strong style) and backgrounds over the years. In 2003, Sasuke left the running of the promotion to Jinsei Shinzaki.

== History ==
Michinoku Pro Wrestling (Michinoku Pro or M-Pro) was founded on October 1, 1992 by The Great Sasuke as a community-based promotion for the northeastern greater Tohoku region of Japan. Their first-ever pre-show was held on November 27, 1992 in Takizawa City, although due to disputes with the Universal Lucha Libre (UWF), the promotion was put on the back-burner for the next several months. Gran Hamada joined M-Pro, and their first-ever show was held on March 16, 1993 in Yahaba, Iwate.

The stable Kaientai Deluxe (海援隊Deluxe) was formed in 1996. Dick Togo, Men's Teioh, TAKA Michinoku, Shoichi Funaki, and Hanzo Nakajima worked as young protagonists looking to make a break in the business. This group competed against The Great Sasuke and Super Delfin. After a couple of years, TAKA and the rest of KAIENTAI moved to the US to compete.

In 1997, Michinoku Pro Wrestling entered into a working relationship with the World Wrestling Federation, with M-Pro founder The Great Sasuke wrestling in two matches for the promotion. The WWF would also send talent to Japan, such as The Undertaker, who would wrestle against M-Pro mainstay Jinsei Shinzaki. During this period, the WWF was planning on holding a tournament to crown the first holder of the WWF Light Heavyweight Championship. It has been theorized in the wrestling press that although Great Sasuke was pushed to be the winner of the tournament, he had bragged to the Japanese media that he would only defend the title in Japan, and would refuse to drop the title on WWF television. When the WWF heard Sasuke's comments, he was removed from the tournament, fired, and the MPW/WWF working agreement was terminated. However, speaking on his Something to Wrestle With podcast in July 2017, Bruce Prichard disputed this version of events, suggesting the WWF never entered into any formal agreement with Sasuke, and that the company was only interested in signing TAKA Michinoku. Michinoku Pro Wrestling alumnus TAKA Michinoku would end up winning the title.

By 1998, the promotion had gone on a temporary hiatus after Sasuke suffered a knee injury that required surgery. Delfin took charge of the promotion for the time being, but on January 17, 1999, he announced that he would be withdrawing from the promotion and that many of the wrestlers and backstage personnel would be joining him. This was in part due to differences regarding the direction of the promotion. Delfin was joined by Gran Naniwa, Masato Yakushiji, Naohiro Hoshikawa, Masaru Seno, Hayato Kigawa, and referee Yukinori Matsui. Delfin formed Osaka Pro Wrestling. TAKA Michinoku and Dick Togo later returned after their stint in the US and competed from time to time. In 2003, Sasuke ran for public office, and Jinsei Shinzaki took over as the president of the promotion. The 10th anniversary of the promotion was held on November 2, 2003 at the Ariake Colosseum in Tokyo, Japan.

In July 2004, the promotion underwent a revival as Ultimo Dragon disbanded his then Toryumon X promotion and sent his talent to join the promotion, which was then dubbed Shinsei Michinoku Pro-Wrestling. Bear Fukuda, Ken45°, Murcielago, and Manabu Murakami were the first to join the promotion. Then in October, Taro Nohashi, Dynamite Tohoku, and Shu and Kei Sato joined the promotion. Then at the end of that year SUGI, Rasse, Kagetora, and Manabu Murakami made their debuts.

On December 13, 2013 Kenoh left the promotion and vacated the Tohoku Junior Heavyweight Championship due to signing with Pro Wrestling Noah. In 2014, Michinoku Pro reactivated the Okinawa Wrestling Championship which was won by Eisa8.

On December 13, 2019 at the Korakuen Hall, the promotion had a sellout, standing-room-only event with an attendance of 1,890, the highest reported attendance at the Korakuen Hall to date for a pro-wrestling event since April 2015.

== Current roster ==
Ring name	Real name	Unit	Notes
Australian Wolf	Mason Childs	Main Unit	
Ayumu Gunji	Ayumu Gunji	Main Unit	
Boso Boy Raito	Unknown	Main Unit	
Brahman Kei	Kei Sato	Mu no Taisho	
Brahman Shu	Shu Sato	Mu no Taisho	
Dick Togo	Shigeki Sato	Main Unit	
Douki	Tatsuya Hayama	Bad Boy	Part-timer
Fujita "Jr." Hayato	Hayato Fujita	Bad Boy	
Gaina	Kazuya Yuasa	Main Unit	Also wrestles under the mask of Shisao; UWA World Tag Team Champion
Ikuto Hidaka	Ikuto Hidaka	N/A	Part-timer
Jinsei Shinzaki	Kensuke Shinzaki	Main Unit	Tohoku Tag Team Champion
Ken45°	Kenichi Sakai	Bad Boy	
Kenbai	Yuki Sato	Main Unit	
Kengo	Kengo Nishimura	N/A	Part-timer
Kesen Numajiro	Akihiro Yonekawa	Main Unit	Part-timer; Also wrestles as Yone Genjin
Koji Kawamura	Koji Kawamura	Main Unit	
Manjimaru	Manabu Murakami	Bad Boy	
Minoru Fujita	Minoru Fujita	N/A	Part-timer
Rasse	Masaki Okimoto	Main Unit	
Rui Hiugaji	Rui Hiugaji	Main Unit	
Taira Ogasawara	Taira Ogasawara	Main Unit	
Taro Nohashi	Taro Nohashi	Main Unit	UWA World Tag Team Champion
The Great Sasuke	Masanori Murakawa	Mu no Taisho	Tohoku Tag Team Champion
Último Dragón	Yoshihiro Asai	N/A	Part-timer
Yapper Man #1	Tatsuhito Senga	Main Unit	
Yapper Man #2	Tsutomu Oosugi	Main Unit	
Yasutaka Oosera	Yasutaka Oosera	Main Unit	Tohoku Junior Heavyweight Champion

== Championships and tournaments ==
=== Current ===
Championship	Current champion(s)	Reign	Date won	Days held	Location	Notes
Tohoku Junior Heavyweight Championship	Sangre Azteca Jr.	1	June 12, 2026	37+	Tokyo, Japan	Defeated Musashi at Michinoku 2026 Tokyo Conference Vol. 1.
Tohoku Tag Team Championship	Demonios (Arashi and Yasutaka Oosera)	1 (1, 1)	November 2, 2025	259+	Tokyo, Japan	Defeated Musashi and Rasse to win the vacant titles at Michinoku Pro Grande Uno 2025.

=== Tournaments ===
Tournament	Latest winner(s)	Date won
Fukumen World League	El Pantera Jr.	October 13, 2024
Kanjin Ōgama League	Oso11	February 25, 2023
Futaritabi Tag Team League	Yapper Man #1 and Yapper Man #2	October 14, 2019

=== Former ===
Championship	Last champion(s)	Date won
UWA World Welterweight Championship	Vacated	2004
UWF Super Welterweight Championship	Vacated	January 4, 2000
UWA World Junior Light Heavyweight Championship	Súper Nova	May 17, 2013
WWF Light Heavyweight Championship	Vacated	November 5, 1997
British Commonwealth Junior Heavyweight Championship	Vacated	December 7, 2003
Independent World Junior Heavyweight Championship	Ikuto Hidaka	February 17, 2002
UWA World Tag Team Championship	Gaina & Taro Nohashi	October 3, 2021

== Notable alumni ==
- Tiger Mask IV
- Gran Hamada
- Shiryu
- Gran Naniwa
- Taka Michinoku
- Kenoh
- Mango Fukuda
- Yoshitsune
- Mr. JL
- Super Delfin
- Shoichi Funaki
- Tony Stradlin
- Bobby Blaze
- Wellington Wilkins Jr.
- MEN'S Teioh
- Minoru Fujita
- CIMA
- Sumo Fujii
- Judo Suwa
- Ikuto Hidaka
- Curry Man
- Danny Boy Collins
- Dynamite Kid
- Johnny Saint
- Undertaker
- Misaki Ohata

== See also ==
- Universal Lucha Libre
- Universal Wrestling Association
- Toryumon
